= Crockett Cup (1988) =

American professional wrestling tournament

- Cover for the official VHS release.
- Promotion: Jim Crockett Promotions
- Date: April 22, 1988; April 23, 1988
- City: Greenville, South Carolina (April 22); Greensboro, North Carolina (April 23)
- Venue: Greenville Memorial Auditorium (April 22); Greensboro Coliseum Complex (April 23)
- Attendance: 4,440 (April 22); 6,300 (April 23)

Event chronology
← Previous; Bunkhouse Stampede	Next → The Great American Bash

Crockett Cup chronology
← Previous; 1987	Next → 2019

The Third Annual Jim Crockett Sr. Memorial Cup Tag Team Tournament, also referred to as the Crockett Cup (1988), was an event held over two nights: April 22 and 23, 1988. Scheduled to feature 24 teams, the tournament included a few changes to the original lineup and ended up with only 23 teams. The team of Sting and Lex Luger was formed specifically for the 1988 Crockett Cup and ended up winning the tournament by defeating Arn Anderson and Tully Blanchard in the finals.

== Production ==
=== Background ===
The Jim Crockett Sr. Memorial Cup Tag Team Tournament was created by Jim Crockett Jr. of Jim Crockett Promotions (JCP) in honor of Crockett's father, JCP founder Jim Crockett Sr. The tournament format was single-elimination with a promoted prize of $1 million (U.S.) awarded to the winning team.

=== Storylines ===
The 1988 Crockett Cup shows featured a total of 21 professional wrestling matches with different wrestlers involved in pre-existing scripted feuds, plots and storylines. Wrestlers are portrayed as either heels (those that portray the "bad guys"), faces (the "good guy" characters) or tweeners (characters that is neither clearly a heel or a face) as they follow a series of tension-building events, which culminated in a wrestling match or series of matches as determined by the promotion.

Lex Luger, scheduled to partner with Barry Windham in the tournament (as they had been the NWA World Tag Team Champions), lost his teammate. Windham turned on Luger just two days before the tournament. The betrayal caused Luger and Windham to lose the title to Arn Anderson and Tully Blanchard, and Windham became the new fourth member of the Four Horsemen, actually taking a spot Luger had been kicked out of months earlier.

The Super Powers (Nikita Koloff and Dusty Rhodes) were also removed from the tournament. Rhodes received a 120-day suspension on April 15 for hitting Jim Crockett with a baseball bat on the March 26 edition of World Championship Wrestling, and was also stripped of his NWA United States Heavyweight Championship. Koloff was then given a match for Ric Flair's NWA World Heavyweight Championship, to take place on the second night of the tournament.

On the first night of the tournament, between the first and second rounds, Jimmy Garvin defeated Kevin Sullivan in a "Prince of Darkness" Blindfold match. Sullivan and Rick Steiner perpetrated a post-match attack on the still blindfolded Garvin. Garvin's brother, Ronnie, attempted to save Jimmy, but during the course of the ensuing brawl, sustained a chest injury due to Sullivan's Golden Spike. This left Sting also without a partner for the tournament, with the announcement later on that Lex Luger and Sting would team up, a partnership that would continue off and on for nearly 15 years. All of these events left the final tournament field at 22 teams.

=== Aftermath ===
The Crockett Cup tournaments ended after 1988 until 2019, the NWA and Ring of Honor teamed up with the Crockett Foundation to resume the tournament (but on a much smaller scale), which is linked to the original tournaments. The NWA (now owned by Billy Corgan and his production company, Lighting One Inc.) have held the tournament yearly (except in 2020 due to the COVID-19 pandemic).

Lex Luger would feud with Ric Flair over the NWA World Heavyweight Championship, receiving a title shot at the Great American Bash. The Fantastics' feud with the Midnight Express over the NWA United States Tag Team Championship would reach a climax at the Bash in a match with the two teams with Jim Cornette suspended in a cage wearing a straight jacket. The Powers of Pain would flee for the WWF before the Bash events began due to their refusal to lose a series of scaffold matches with the Road Warriors. Dusty Rhodes would return from his suspension after the tournament (kayfabe through the efforts of Houston promoter Paul Boesch) but would not regain his United States title.

== Event ==
=== Tournament participants ===
Team	Notes	Ref(s).
Johnny Ace and John Savage		
Arn Anderson and Tully Blanchard	First-round bye	
Brad Armstrong and Tim Horner		
Chris Champion and Mark Starr		
Tiger Conway Jr. and Shaska Whatley		
The Cruel Connection (#1 and #2)		
Joe Cruz and Ricky Santana		
The Fantastics (Bobby Fulton and Tommy Rogers)	First-round bye	
~~Ron Garvin and Sting~~	Unable to compete as Garvin was injured	
The Green Machine and The Terminator		
The Italian Stallion and Kendall Windham		
Rocky King and Nelson Royal		
Ivan Koloff and Dick Murdoch		
Sting and Lex Luger	First-round bye	
~~Lex Luger and Barry Windham~~	Barry Windham turned on Luger shortly before the tournament	
The Midnight Express (Bobby Eaton and Stan Lane)	First-round bye	
Mighty Wilbur and Jimmy Valiant	Note	
Al Perez and Larry Zbyszko		
The Powers of Pain (The Barbarian and The Warlord)	First-round bye	
The Road Warriors (Animal and Hawk)	First-round bye	
The Sheepherders (Butch Miller and Luke Williams)		
Ron Simmons and Steve Williams	First-round bye	
The Twin Devils (#1 and #2)		
The Varsity Club (Mike Rotunda and Rick Steiner)	First-round bye	

== Results ==
No.	Results	Stipulations
1	Jimmy Garvin defeated Kevin Sullivan	Blindfold match
2	The Midnight Rider defeated J. J. Dillon	Bullrope match (April 23, between quarterfinal and semifinal rounds)
3	Nikita Koloff defeated Ric Flair by disqualification,	Singles match for the NWA World Heavyweight Championship

=== Tournament brackets ===
First round
Ace/Savage
Horner/Armstrong	W
Cruel Connection
Sheepherders	W
Koloff/Murdoch	W
Wilbur/Valiant
Champion/Starr	W
Twin Devils
King/Royal
Conway Jr./Whatley	W
Machine/Terminator
Stallion/Windham	W
Cruz/Santana
Perez/Zbyszko	W

Second round
Horner/Armstrong
Sheepherders	W
Koloff/Murdoch
Luger/Sting	W
Powers of Pain	W
Champion/Starr
Conway Jr./Whatley
Road Warriors	W
Anderson/Blanchard	W
Stallion/Windham
BYE^{2}	N/A
BYE^{2}	N/A
Perez/Zbyszko
Fantastics	W
Varsity Club	W
Simmons/Williams

Quarter Finals
Midnight Express^{1}
Luger/Sting	W
Powers of Pain	W
Road Warriors
Anderson/Blanchard	W
BYE^{2}	N/A
Fantastics	W
Varsity Club

Semi Finals
Luger/Sting	W
Powers of Pain
Anderson/Blanchard	W
Fantastics

Final
Luger/Sting	W
Anderson/Blanchard

- ^{1} For unclear reasons, the Midnight Express (Eaton/Lane) wrestled the Sheepherders in an additional second-round match (unlisted in the tournament brackets above) at the conclusion of the round. They defeated the Sheepherders and took their place in the tournament.
- ^{2} Anderson and Blanchard received a bye to the semi-final round to make up for the empty 24th spot in the bracket.
