= Crockett Cup (2022) =

National Wrestling Alliance professional wrestling show

- Promotional poster featuring various NWA wrestlers
- Promotion: National Wrestling Alliance
- Date: March 19–20, 2022
- City: Nashville, Tennessee
- Venue: Nashville Fairgrounds
- Attendance: 500-600

Event chronology
← Previous; Hard Times 2	Next → Alwayz Ready

Crockett Cup chronology
← Previous; 2019	Next → 2023

The Fifth Annual Jim Crockett Sr. Memorial Cup Tag Team Tournament (also known as the Crockett Cup (2022)) was a professional wrestling tag team tournament produced by the National Wrestling Alliance (NWA). The event took place on March 19 and 20, 2022, at the Nashville Fairgrounds in Nashville, Tennessee. It was the fifth iteration of the event, and the first to be held since 2019; the 2020 event had been planned, but was cancelled due to the COVID-19 pandemic, and no event was scheduled in 2021 because of the lingering pandemic.

== Production ==
=== Background ===
The Jim Crockett Sr. Memorial Cup Tag Team Tournament is a tag team tournament first held in April 1986. National Wrestling Alliance (NWA) member Jim Crockett Promotions (JCP), headed by Jim Crockett Jr., hosted the Crockett Cup, held in honor of Crockett's father, JCP founder Jim Crockett Sr. and saw participation of teams from various NWA territories. JCP held the tournament again in 1987 and 1988, before JCP was sold to Ted Turner later that year. In July 2017, the Crockett Foundation, with Classic Pro Wrestling, held the "Crockett Foundation Cup Tag Team Tournament" in New Kent, Virginia, which was not affiliated with the NWA. Bobby Fulton, The Barbarian, and The Rock 'n' Roll Express, all former Crockett Cup participants, took part in the event as a link to the original tournaments.

The original concept of the Crockett Cup was a single elimination tag team tournament, with the storyline prize of $1,000,000.00 given to the winning team along with a large trophy. The 1986 and 1987 tournaments featured 24 teams, while the 1988 version had 22 teams competing. Each tournament was split over two shows to encompass all 23 tournament matches as well as non-tournament matches; in 1986, JCP held a show in the afternoon and another in the evening, while the 1987 and 1988, the tournament was spread out over two days instead.

On January 31, 2022, it was announced that the Crockett Cup would return and would be held in on March 19–20 at the Nashville Fairgrounds in Nashville, Tennessee.

=== Storylines ===
The event featured several professional wrestling matches with different wrestlers involved in pre-existing scripted feuds, plots, and storylines. Wrestlers were portrayed as either heels (those that portray the "bad guys"), faces (the "good guy" characters), or tweeners (characters that are neither clearly a heel or a face) as they follow a series of tension-building events, which culminate in a wrestling match or series of matches as determined by the promotion. The seventh season of the NWA's weekly flagship program, Powerr, featured storylines leading up to the event.

==== Tournament matches ====
The main feature of the event is the titular Crockett Cup, a tag team tournament where, in addition to the namesake trophy, the winners will earn a match for the NWA World Tag Team Championship. The tournament will be contested with 16 teams, double the amount of the 2019 event.

The following teams have been announced for the tournament:

- La Rebelión (Bestia 666 and Mecha Wolf) (NWA World Tag Team Champions)
- The Briscoe Brothers (Jay Briscoe and Mark Briscoe) (ROH World Tag Team Champions)
- Doug Williams and Harry Smith
- Strictly Business (Chris Adonis & Thom Latimer)
- The OGK (Mike Bennett and Matt Taven)
- The Fixers (Jay Bradley and Wrecking Ball Legursky)
- Mims and The Pope
- Aron Stevens and J. R. Kratos (later replaced by The Blue Meanie)
- Gold Rushhh (Jordan Clearwater and Marshe Rockett)
- The End (Odinson and Parrow)
- Hawx Aerie (Luke Hawx and PJ Hawx)
- The Dirty Sexy Boys (Dirty Dango and JTG)
- The Cardonas (Mike Knox and VSK)
- The Ill Begotten (Alex Taylor and Rush Freeman)
- The NOW (Hale Collins and Vik Dalishus)

In addition, Night 1 on March 19 will feature a four-way match to determine the 16 seed in the tournament. The teams are:

- Violence Is Forever (Dominic Garrini and Kevin Ku)
- The Bad News Boyz (Brandon Tate and Brent Tate)
- The Rip City Shooters (Joshua Bishop and Wes Barkley)
- The Heatseekers (Elliott Russell and Sigmon)

==== Other matches ====
During the full card run-down for Hard Times 2, NWA President Billy Corgan announced the return of the NWA World Junior Heavyweight Championship, which has been inactive for five years, with the four-way tournament final to determine the new champion taking place on March 20. Matches from the Junior Heavyweight tournament were taped for the NWA's new weekly series, NWA USA. The four-way match will feature Austin Aries, Homicide, Darius Lockhart and Colby Corino compete for the vacant World Junior Heavyweight Championship.

At NWA PowerrrTrip, Matt Cardona defeated Trevor Murdoch to win the NWA Worlds Heavyweight Championship. After the match, he would be confronted by Nick Aldis, the man who Murdoch beat to become the champion. Aldis would enact his rematch clause to face Cardona for the title at the Crockett Cup. On March 1, it was announced that the ambassador for the event, Jeff Jarrett, will also be the special guest referee for the NWA world title match, at the demands of Cardona for an unbiased official.

At NWA 73, Jax Dane attacked his tag team partner Crimson before the latter's hardcore triple threat match with Thom Latimer and Tim Storm, officially dissolving The War Kings. Two weeks later on Powerrr, the former partners participated in a slap fight hosted by then-NWA Worlds Heavyweight Champion Trevor Murdoch. However, Dane would soon punch instead of slap Crimson in the face, causing a scuffle between the two. On September 17, at By Any Means Necessary, Dane would defeat Crimson in a Steel Cage match. At PowerrrTrip the following February, Crimson, now going by Anthony Mayweather, defeated Chris Adonis to win the NWA National Championship. On March 4, it was announced that Mayweather will make his first defense of the title against Dane on Night 2 of the Crockett Cup.

== Event ==
Other on-screen personnel
Commentators	Joe Galli
Commentators	Tim Storm
Commentators	Velvet Sky (Main Card)
Backstage interviewer	May Valentine
Interviewer	Kyle Davis

=== Night 1 ===
==== Preliminary matches ====
During the first night of the Crockett Cup pre-show, Captain Yuma (accompanied by Danny Deals and Jeremiah Plunkett) faced Magic Jake Dumas. In the end, Dumas performed "The Abracadabra" on Yuma to win the match.

Also on the pre-show, The Bad News Boyz (Brandon Tate and Brent Tate), The Heatseekers (Elliott Russell and Matt Sigmon), The Rip City Shooters (Joshua Bishop and Wes Barkley) and Violence Is Forever (Dominic Garrini and Kevin Ku) competed in a four-way match to determine the 16 seed in the tournament. In the end, Brent Tate rolled up Garrini into pinfall to win the match for his team.

After that, The Briscoe Brothers (Jay Briscoe and Mark Briscoe) faced The Now (Hale Collins and Vik Dalishus) in the first round of the Crockett Cup. In the end, Mark Briscoe performed the "Froggy Bow" on Dalishus to win the match for his team.

==== Preliminary matches ====
The actual pay-per-view started with the first round of the Crockett Cup, where The End (Odinson and Parrow) faced Hawx Aerie (Luke Hawx and PJ Hawx). At the end, Odinson put PJ in an airplane spin; however, PJ reversed it into a small package to win the match for his team. After the match, The End attacked Hawx Aerie.

== Results ==
Night 1
No.	Results	Stipulations	Times
1^{P}	Magic Jake Dumas defeated Captain Yuma (with Danny Deals and Jeremiah Plunkett) by pinfall	Singles match	4:44
2^{P}	The Bad News Boyz (Brandon Tate and Brent Tate) defeated The Heatseekers (Elliott Russell and Matt Sigmon), The Rip City Shooters (Joshua Bishop and Wes Barkley), and Violence Is Forever (Dominic Garrini and Kevin Ku) by pinfall	Four-way tag team match Play-In Match to determine the 16 seed in the Crockett Cup tournament	9:45
3^{P}	The Briscoe Brothers (Jay Briscoe and Mark Briscoe) defeated The Now (Hale Collins and Vik Dalishus) by pinfall	Crockett Cup first round match	8:21
4	Hawx Aerie (Luke Hawx and PJ Hawx) defeated The End (Odinson and Parrow) by pinfall	Crockett Cup first round match	9:20
5	The Cardonas (Mike Knox and VSK) defeated Da Pope and Mims by pinfall	Crockett Cup first round match	9:59
6	The Dirty Sexy Boys (Dirty Dango and JTG) defeated Aron Stevens and The Blue Meanie by pinfall	Crockett Cup first round match	6:40
7	Gold Rushhh (Jordan Clearwater and Marshe Rockett) (with BLK Jeez and Tyrus) defeated Strictly Business (Chris Adonis and Thom Latimer) by pinfall	Crockett Cup first round match	4:18
8	The Commonwealth Connection (Doug Williams and Harry Smith) defeated The Ill Begotten (Alex Taylor and Rush Freeman) (with Jeremiah Plunkett) by pinfall	Crockett Cup first round match	6:38
9	La Rebelión (Bestia 666 and Mecha Wolf) defeated The Bad News Boyz (Brandon Tate and Brent Tate) by pinfall	Crockett Cup first round match	8:59
10	The Cardonas (Mike Knox and VSK) defeated The Fixers (Jay Bradley and Wrecking Ball Legursky) by pinfall	Crockett Cup quarterfinals tag team match	7:03
11	The Briscoe Brothers (Jay Briscoe and Mark Briscoe) defeated The Dirty Sexy Boys (Dirty Dango and JTG) by pinfalll	Crockett Cup quarterfinals tag team match	8:13
12	La Rebelión (Bestia 666 and Mecha Wolf) defeated PJ Hawx by pinfall	Crockett Cup quarterfinals 2-on-1 Handicap match	7:25
13	The Commonwealth Connection (Doug Williams and Harry Smith) defeated Gold Rushhh (Jordan Clearwater and Marshe Rockett) (with BLK Jeez) by submission	Crockett Cup quarterfinals tag team match	12:50
P / – the match was broadcast on the pre-show

Night 2
No.	Results	Stipulations	Times
1^{P}	Mims defeated AJ Cazana by pinfall	Singles match	9:15
2^{P}	Cyon and The OGK (Matt Taven and Mike Bennett) defeated Magic Jake Dumas and The Fixers (Jay Bradley and Wrecking Ball Legursky), and Idolmania Sports Management (BLK Jeez, Jordan Clearwater, and Marshe Rockett) (with Austin Idol) by pinfall	Team War match	11:47
3^{P}	PJ Hawx defeated Alex Taylor (with Captain Yuma) by submission	Singles match	6:37
4	The Briscoe Brothers (Jay Briscoe and Mark Briscoe) defeated The Cardonas (Mike Knox and VSK) by pinfall	Crockett Cup semifinal tag team match	7:45
5	The Commonwealth Connection (Doug Williams and Harry Smith) defeated La Rebelión (Bestia 666 and Mecha Wolf) by pinfall	Crockett Cup semifinal tag team match	8:58
6	Anthony Mayweather (c) defeated Jax Dane by submission	Singles match for the NWA National Championship	10:11
7	Jax Dane defeated Anthony Mayweather (c) by pinfall	Singles match for the NWA National Championship; This was Dane's Champions Series cash-in match	0:31
8	The Hex (Allysin Kay and Marti Belle) (c) defeated Pretty Empowered (Ella Envy and Kenzie Paige) by pinfall	Tag team match for the NWA World Women's Tag Team Championship	7:09
9	Homicide defeated Austin Aries, Colby Corino, and Darius Lockhart by pinfall	Four-way match for the vacant NWA World Junior Heavyweight Championship	9:39
10	Kamille (c) defeated Chelsea Green and Kylie Rae by pinfall	Three-way match for the NWA World Women's Championship	12:02
11	Tyrus (c) defeated Rodney Mack by pinfall	Singles match for the NWA World Television Championship	8:14
12	The Briscoe Brothers (Jay Briscoe and Mark Briscoe) defeated The Commonwealth Connection (Doug Williams and Harry Smith) by pinfall	Crockett Cup final tag team match	13:55
13	Matt Cardona (c) defeated Nick Aldis by disqualification	Singles match for the NWA Worlds Heavyweight Championship with Jeff Jarrett as special guest referee	21:11
(c) / – the champion(s) heading into the match; P / – the match was broadcast on the pre-show

=== 2022 Crockett Cup tournament brackets ===
First Round; NWA PowerrrTrip (February 12); Crockett Cup (March 19)
1	La Rebelión (Bestia 666 and Mecha Wolf)	Pin
16	The Bad News Boyz (Brandon Tate and Brent Tate)	8:59
8	The End (Odinson and Parrow)	9:20
9	Hawx Aerie (Luke Hawx and PJ Hawx)	Pin
5	Strictly Business (Chris Adonis and Thom Latimer)	4:18
12	Gold Rushhh (Jordan Clearwater and Marshe Rockett)	Pin
4	The Commonwealth Connection (Doug Williams and Harry Smith)	Pin
13	The Ill Begotten (Alex Taylor and Rush Freeman)	6:38
6	Mims and The Pope	9:59
11	The Cardonas (Mike Knox and VSK)	Pin
3	The OGK (Matt Taven and Mike Bennett)	10:47
14	The Fixers (Jay Bradley and Wrecking Ball Legursky)	Pin
7	Aron Stevens and The Blue Meanie^{2}	6:40
10	The Dirty Sexy Boys (Dirty Dango and JTG)	Pin
2	The Briscoe Brothers (Jay Briscoe and Mark Briscoe)	Pin
15	The NOW (Hale Collins and Vik Dalishus)	8:21

Quarterfinals; March 19
1	La Rebelión	Pin
9	PJ Hawx^{1}	7:25
5	Gold Rushhh	12:50
4	The Commonwealth Connection	Sub
11	The Cardonas	Pin
13	The Fixers	7:03
10	The Dirty Sexy Boys	8:13
2	The Briscoe Brothers	Pin

Semifinals; March 20
1	La Rebelión	8:58
4	The Commonwealth Connection	Pin
11	The Cardonas	7:45
2	The Briscoe Brothers	Pin

Final; March 20
4	The Commonwealth Connection	13:55
2	The Briscoe Brothers	Pin

1 The End attacked Hawx Aerie after their match, giving Luke a concussion. PJ was forced to represent his team alone.
2 JR Kratos was Stevens' original partner before he was replaced by The Blue Meanie.

=== NWA World Junior Heavyweight Championship Tournament ===
First Round

- Homicide wins a gauntlet match to advance to the finals - Hard Times 2, December 4, 2021
- Austin Aries defeated Rhett Titus - Hard Times 2, December 4, 2021
- Colby Corino defeated CW Anderson (with George South) - NWA USA, January 8, 2022
- Luke Hawx defeated PJ Hawx - NWA USA, January 8, 2022
- Ariya Daivari defeated J Spade - NWA USA, January 15, 2022
- Kerry Morton (with Ricky Morton) defeated Jamie Stanley - NWA USA, January 22, 2022
- Darius Lockhart defeated Sal Rinauro (with Danny Deals) - NWA USA, January 29, 2022

Second Round

- Darius Lockhart defeated Ariya Daivari - NWA USA, February 5, 2022
- Austin Aries defeated Luke Hawx (with PJ Hawx) - NWA USA, February 5, 2022
- Colby Corino (with Jay Bradley and Wrecking Ball Legursky) defeated Kerry Morton (with Ricky Morton) - NWA USA, February 12, 2022

Final

- Homicide defeated Austin Aries, Darius Lockhart, and Colby Corino - Crockett Cup (Night 2), March 20, 2022

=== Team War match ===
Eliminated	Wrestler	Eliminated by	Method	Team
1	BLK Jeez	Cyon	Pinned after a death valley driver	Team Idolmania Sports Management
2	Marshe Rockett	Cyon	Submitted to a crossface	Team Idolmania Sports Management
3	Cyon	Jordan Clearwater	Pinned after the Midas Touch	Team Cyon and OGK
4	"Magic" Jake Dumas	Jordan Clearwater	Eliminated after being thrown over the top rope	Team Dumas and Fixers
5	Jordan Clearwater	Wrecking Ball Legursky	Pinned after a running splash	Team Idolmania Sports Management
6	Wrecking Ball Legursky	Mike Bennett	Pinned after a running forearm smash	Team Dumas and Fixers
7	Mike Bennett	Jay Bradley	Pinned after a side slam	Team Cyon and OGK
8	Jay Bradley	Matt Taven	Pinned after the Climax	Team Dumas and Fixers
Winner	Matt Taven	N/A		Team Cyon and OGK

== See also ==
- 2022 in professional wrestling
