= 1987 in professional wrestling =

1987 in professional wrestling describes the year's events in the world of professional wrestling.

== List of notable promotions ==
These promotions held notable events in 1987.

Promotion Name	Abbreviation
All Japan Women's Pro-Wrestling	AJW
American Wrestling Association	AWA
Championship Wrestling from Florida	CWF
Empresa Mexicana de Lucha Libre	EMLL
Jim Crockett Promotions	JCP
New Japan Pro Wrestling	NJPW
World Class Championship Wrestling	WCCW
World Wrestling Council	WWC
World Wrestling Federation	WWF

== Calendar of notable shows ==
Date	Promotion(s)	Event	Location	Main Event
February 21	WWF	Saturday Night's Main Event	Detroit, Michigan	Randy Savage (c) defeated George Steele by count-out in a singles match for the WWF Intercontinental Championship and the managerial services of Miss Elizabeth
March 29	WWF	WrestleMania III	Pontiac, Michigan	Hulk Hogan (c) defeated André the Giant in a singles match for the WWF World Heavyweight Championship
April 12	EMLL	31. Aniversario de Arena México	Mexico City, Mexico	Cien Caras defeated Siglo XX in a Lucha de Apuestas hair vs. hair match
April 10–11	JCP	2nd Annual Jim Crockett Sr. Memorial Cup Tag Team Tournament	Baltimore, Maryland	April 11: The Super Powers (Nikita Koloff and Dusty Rhodes) defeated Tully Blanchard and Lex Luger in a tournament final
April 16	AWA	Rage in a Cage II	Las Vegas, Nevada	Wahoo McDaniel defeated Curt Hennig in a Steel Cage Match
April 28	WWF	Saturday Night's Main Event	Notre Dame, Indiana	Randy Savage defeated George Steele in a Lumberjack match
May 2	AWA	SuperClash II	Daly City, California	Curt Hennig defeated Nick Bockwinkel (c) in a singles match for the AWA World Heavyweight Championship
May 3	WCCW	4th Von Erich Memorial Parade of Champions	Irving, Texas	Kevin Von Erich (c) wrestled Nord the Barbarian to a double count out in a singles match for the WCWA World Heavyweight Championship
May 9	CWF	First Annual Eddie Graham Memorial Show	St. Petersburg, Florida	Dusty Rhodes (c) defeated Ric Flair by disqualification in a singles match for the NWA World Heavyweight Championship
June 12	NJPW	G1 Climax	Tokyo, Japan	Antonio Inoki defeated Masa Saito in the finals
June 25	AJW	Japan Grand Prix	Tokyo, Japan	Chigusa Nagayo defeated Dump Matsumoto in the finals
July 4	JCP	The Great American Bash	Atlanta	The Road Warriors (Animal and Hawk), Nikita Koloff, Dusty Rhodes and Paul Ellering defeated The Four Horsemen (Ric Flair, Arn Anderson, Lex Luger, Tully Blanchard and J. J. Dillon) in a WarGames match
July 18	JCP	The Great American Bash	Charlotte, North Carolina	Dusty Rhodes defeated Tully Blanchard in a "lights-out" Barbed Wire Ladder match for $100,000.
July 31	JCP	The Great American Bash	Miami	The Road Warriors (Animal and Hawk), Dusty Rhodes, Nikita Koloff and Paul Ellering defeated The Four Horsemen (Ric Flair, Arn Anderson, Lex Luger and Tully Blanchard) and The War Machine in a WarGames match
September 1	CWF	Battle of the Belts III	Daytona Beach, Florida	Ric Flair (c) fought Lex Luger to a draw in a 2-out-of-3 Falls Match for the NWA World Heavyweight Championship
September 4	WWF	King of the Ring	Providence, Rhode Island	Randy Savage defeated King Kong Bundy in a King of the Ring tournament final match
September 18	EMLL	EMLL 54th Anniversary Show	Mexico City, Mexico	Mogur defeated As Charro in a Lucha de Apuestas mask vs. mask match
September 20	WWC	WWC 14th Aniversario	Bayamón, Puerto Rico; Mayaguez, Puerto Rico; Ponce, Puerto Rico	Invader #1 defeated Chicky Starr in a "Retirement vs. hair" match
September 23	WWF	Saturday Night's Main Event	Hershey, Pennsylvania	Hulk Hogan (c) defeated Sika in a singles match for the WWF World Heavyweight Championship
October 10	AJW	Tag League the Best	Tokyo, Japan	Chigusa Nagayo & Yumiko Hotta defeated Hisako Uno & Yukari Omori in the finals
October 17	WCCW	4th Cotton Bowl Extravaganza	Dallas, Texas	Kevin Von Erich defeated Al Perez (c) in a singles match for the WCWA World Heavyweight Championship
November 11	WWF	Saturday Night's Main Event	Seattle, Washington	King Kong Bundy defeated Hulk Hogan (c) in a singles match for the WWF World Heavyweight Championship
November 26	WWF	Survivor Series	Richfield Township, Ohio	André the Giant, Butch Reed, King Kong Bundy, One Man Gang and Rick Rude defeated Bam Bam Bigelow, Don Muraco, Hulk Hogan, Ken Patera and Paul Orndorff in a 5-on-5 Survivor Series match
November 26	JCP	Starrcade	Chicago, Illinois	Ric Flair defeated Ron Garvin (c) in a steel cage match for the NWA World Heavyweight Championship
December 7	NJPW	Japan Cup Tag League	Tokyo, Japan	Antonio Inoki & Dick Murdoch defeated Kengo Kimura & Tatsumi Fujinami in the finals
December 7	WWF	Saturday Night's Main Event	Landover, Maryland	Hulk Hogan (c) defeated King Kong Bundy in a singles match for the WWF World Heavyweight Championship
December 26	AJW	All Japan Women's Pro-Wrestling at Korauken Hall	Tokyo, Japan	Devil Masami has her retirement match against Chigusa Nagayo
(c) – denotes defending champion(s)

== Tournaments and accomplishments ==
=== AJW ===
Accomplishment	Winner	Date won	Notes
Japan Grand Prix 1987	Chigusa Nagayo	June 28	
Rookie of the Year Decision Tournament	Toshiyo Yamada		
Tag League the Best 1987	Chigusa Nagayo and Lioness Asuka	October 11	

=== JCP ===
Accomplishment	Winner	Date won	Notes
Bunkhouse Stampede	Dusty Rhodes		
Jim Crockett Sr. Memorial Cup Tag Team Tournament	The Super Powers (Nikita Koloff and Dusty Rhodes)	April 11	

=== WWF ===
Accomplishment	Winner	Date won	Notes
Frank Tunney Sr. Memorial Tag Team Tournament	The Killer Bees (B. Brian Blair and Jim Brunzell)	March 15	
King of the Ring	Randy Savage	September 4	

==== Slammy Awards ====
Poll	Winner
Best Performance by an Animal	George "The Animal" Steele
Woman of the Year	Miss Elizabeth
Best Ring Apparel	Harley Race
Hulk Hogan Real American Award	Superstar Billy Graham
Jesse "The Body" Award	"Ravishing" Rick Rude
Greatest Hit	Jim Duggan
Manager of the Year	None
Best Personal Hygiene	Nikolai Volkoff, Boris Zhukov, and Slick
Best Vocal Performance	Jim Duggan
Song of the Year	No winner (envelope eaten by Sika)
Best Group	One Man Gang
Humanitarian of the Year	Ted DiBiase
Best Head	Gene Okerlund and Bam Bam Bigelow
Bobby "The Brain" Heenan Scholarship Award	The Islanders (Haku & Tama), André the Giant, Hercules, King Kong Bundy, and Harley Race

== Awards and honors ==
=== Pro Wrestling Illustrated ===
Category	Winner
PWI Wrestler of the Year	Hulk Hogan
PWI Tag Team of the Year	The Midnight Express (Bobby Eaton and Stan Lane)
PWI Match of the Year	Randy Savage vs. Ricky Steamboat (WrestleMania III)
PWI Feud of the Year	The Four Horsemen (Ric Flair, Arn Anderson, Tully Blanchard and Lex Luger) vs. The Super Powers (Dusty Rhodes and Nikita Koloff) and The Road Warriors (Hawk and Animal)
PWI Most Popular Wrestler of the Year	Dusty Rhodes
PWI Most Hated Wrestler of the Year	Ric Flair
PWI Most Improved Wrestler of the Year	Curt Hennig
PWI Most Inspirational Wrestler of the Year	Nikita Koloff
PWI Rookie of the Year	Owen Hart
PWI Lifetime Achievement	Paul Boesch
PWI Editor's Award	Jimmy Hart

=== Wrestling Observer Newsletter ===
Category	Winner
Wrestler of the Year	Riki Choshu
Most Outstanding	Ric Flair
Feud of the Year	Austin Idol and Tommy Rich vs. Jerry Lawler
Tag Team of the Year	The Midnight Express (Bobby Eaton and Stan Lane)
Most Improved	Rick Steiner
Best on Interviews	Jim Cornette

== Title changes ==
=== WWF ===
WWF World Heavyweight Championship
Incoming champion – Hulk Hogan
Date	Winner	Event/Show	Note(s)
No title changes

WWF Intercontinental Championship
Incoming champion – Randy Savage
Date	Winner	Event/Show	Note(s)
March 29	Ricky Steamboat	WrestleMania III	
June 2	The Honky Tonk Man	Superstars of Wrestling	Aired on tape delay on June 13

WWF World Martial Arts Heavyweight Championship
Incoming champion – Antonio Inoki
Date	Winner	Event/Show	Note(s)
No title changes

WWF Women's Tag Team Championship
Incoming champions – The Glamour Girls (Leilani Kai and Judy Martin)
Date	Winner	Event/Show	Note(s)
No title changes

WWF Women's Championship
Incoming champion – The Fabulous Moolah
Date	Winner	Event/Show	Note(s)
July 24	Sensational Sherri	Live event	

WWF Tag Team Championship
Incoming champions – The British Bulldogs (British Bulldog and Dynamite Kid)
Date	Winner	Event/Show	Note(s)
January 26	The Hart Foundation (Bret Hart and Jim Neidhart)	Superstars	aired on tape delay on February 7
August 10	The Rougeau Brothers (Jacques and Raymond Rougeau)	House show	
October 27	Strike Force (Rick Martel and Tito Santana)	Superstars	Aired on tape delay on November 7

== Births ==
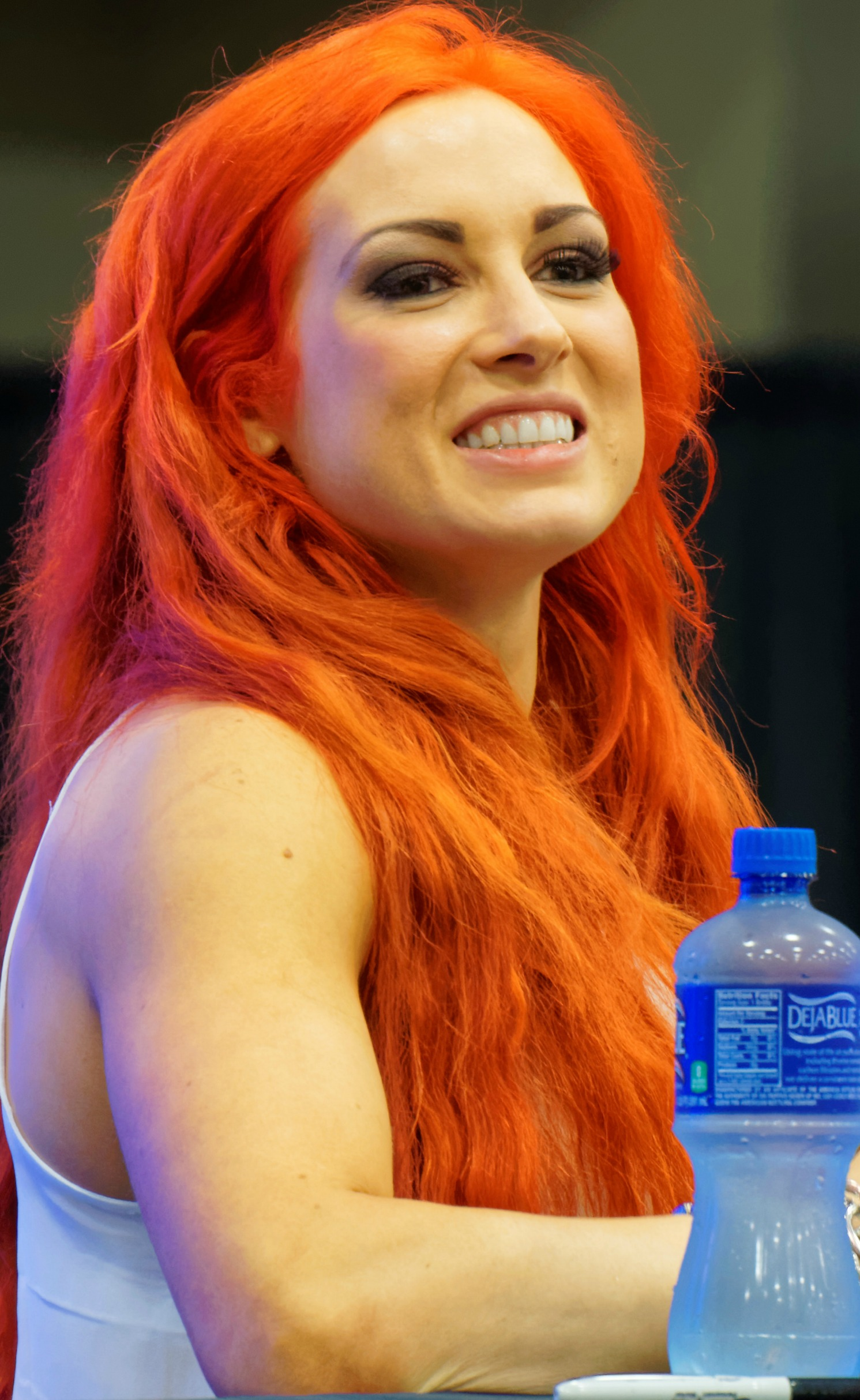
Becky Lynch

- January 5 – Willie Mack
- January 7 – Alisha Edwards
- January 13 - Ian Riccaboni
- January 15:
  - Kelly Kelly
  - Nicole Matthews
- January 25 – Laura James
- January 30 – Becky Lynch
- February 1 – Ronda Rousey
- February 28 – Yoshiko Hasegawa
- March 1 – Kyle O'Reilly
- March 9 – Aubrey Edwards
- March 17 – Brody King
- March 19 – AJ Lee
- March 20 – Nao Kakuta
- March 30 – Trent Beretta
- April 22 – Yusuke Kodama
- April 23 – Donovan Dijak
- April 28 – Drew Gulak
- April 29 – Brittney Savage
- May 2 – Pat McAfee
- May 7 – Angélico
- May 11 – Lince Dorado
- May 17 – Dash Wilder
- May 23 – Bray Wyatt(died in 2023)
- May 26 – Steve Maclin
- July 7 – Richie Steamboat
- July 9 – Mini Charly Manson
- July 14 – Charly Caruso
- July 20 – Evil Uno
- July 24 – Zack Sabre Jr.
- July 28 – Lindsay Kay Hayward
- August 11 – Chris Dickinson
- August 14 – Johnny Gargano
- August 15 – Shinichiro Tominaga
- August 16 - Big Bill (wrestler)
- August 22 – Apollo Crews
- September 1 – Sami Callihan
- September 3 – Allie
- September 4 – Wesley Blake
- September 5 – A. R. Fox
- September 15 – Rhett Titus
- September 21 – Ivelisse Vélez
- October 7 – Aiden English
- October 23 – Carmella
- October 26 – Portia Perez
- November 2 – Samir Singh
- November 3 – Cameron
- November 5 – Allysin Kay
- November 8 – Kazuchika Okada
- November 22 – Elias
- November 30 – Naomi
- December 7 – A. C. H.
- December 26 - Mina Shirakawa
- December 27 – Andy Leavine

== Debuts ==
=== Debut date ===
- January 3 - P. N. News
- January 6 - Konnan
- January 24 - Eden Mabuchi (JWP)
- March 22 - El Felino
- March 31 - Isao Takagi
- April 2 - Art Barr
- April 11 - Moon Ayako (JWP)
- April 16 - Selina Majors
- May 13 - Último Dragón
- May 29 - Neftaly
- June - Maxx Payne
- June 3 - Taz
- June 9 - Raja Lion
- June 26 - The Undertaker
- July 27 - Toshiyo Yamada
- August 5 - Manami Toyota, Etsuko Mita and Mima Shimoda
- August 7 - Malia Hosaka
- September 12 - Bomber Hikaru (JWP)
- October 10 - Skayde
- October 28 - Roadblock
- November 11 - Miki Handa (JWP)
- November 12 - DeWayne Bruce
- November 23 - Sachiko Koganei (JWP)
- December 17 - Alex Pourteau

=== Uncertain debut date ===
- Amy the Farmer's Daughter
- Hardcore Holly
- Balls Mahoney
- John Tenta
- Firebreaker Chip
- Abismo Negro
- Pierre Carl Ouellet
- Cynthia Moreno
- Glacier
- Johnny Grunge
- Joey Maggs
- Lloyd Anoa'i
- The Terminator
- Robert Swenson
- Sid Vicious
- Timothy Well
- Tommy Angel
- Damien Demento
- Ron and Don Harris
- Sad Genius

== Retirements ==
- Tony Garea (1971–1987)
- Armand Rougeau (1982–1987)
- Bob Boyer (wrestler) (1950s-1987)
- Bob Sweetan (1966–1987)
- Bruno Sammartino (1959–1987)
- David Schultz (1974–1987)
- Huracan Ramirez (1941–1987)
- Ivan Putski (1968–1987)
- Kelly Kiniski (1980–1987)
- Killer Khan (1971–1987)
- Ron Fuller (1973–1987)
- Klondike Bill (1958–1987)
- Moose Cholak (1952–1987)
- Nick Bockwinkel (1955–1987)
- Paul Boesch (1938–1987)
- Pedro Morales (1959–1987)
- Rene Goulet (1957–1987)
- Super Maxx (1981–1987)
- Superstar Billy Graham (1970–1987)
- Tony Marino (1954–1987)
- Tor Kamata (1959–1987)
- Al Costello (1938–1987)

== Deaths ==
- Unknown - Milton Reid, 69 or 70 (born 1917)
- January unknown date - Atholl Oakeley, 86
- January 10 - Steve Casey, 78
- April 12:
  - Mike Von Erich, 23
  - Akram Pahalwan, 56 or 57 (born 1930)
- April 27 - Jim Austeri, 72
- August 24 – Malcolm Kirk, 51
- August 27 - Peter Mehringer, 77
- August 30 - Frank Stojack, 75
- September 3 - Rusty Wescoatt, 76
- September 5 – Scott Irwin, 35
- October 22 - Lino Ventura, 68
- November 28 – Kazuharu Sonoda, 31
- December 4 - Betty Jo Hawkins, 57

== See also ==
- List of WCW pay-per-view events
- List of WWF pay-per-view events
