= Crockett Cup (1987) =

American professional wrestling tournament

- Cover for the official VHS tape.
- Promotion: Jim Crockett Promotions
- Date: April 10, 1987; April 11, 1987
- City: Baltimore, Maryland
- Venue: Baltimore Arena
- Attendance: 9,300 (April 10); 13,000 (April 11)

Event chronology
← Previous; Starrcade	Next → The Great American Bash

Crockett Cup chronology
← Previous; 1986	Next → 1988

The Second Annual Jim Crockett Sr. Memorial Cup Tag Team Tournament, also referred to as the Crocket Cup (1987), was an event held over two nights: April 10 and 11, 1987. The tournament included 24 tag teams. The tournament was won by "The Super Powers" (Dusty Rhodes and Nikita Koloff), who defeated Lex Luger and Tully Blanchard in the finals. Their victory was dedicated to Magnum T. A., who was forced to retire due to a near-fatal car accident.

== Production ==
=== Background ===
The Jim Crockett Sr. Memorial Cup Tag Team Tournament was created by Jim Crockett Jr. of Jim Crockett Promotions (JCP) in honor of Crockett's father, JCP founder Jim Crockett Sr. The tournament format was single-elimination with a promoted prize of $1 million (U.S.) awarded to the winning team.

=== Storylines ===
The 1987 Crockett Cup shows featured a total of 25 professional wrestling matches with different wrestlers involved in pre-existing scripted feuds, plots and storylines. Wrestlers are portrayed as either heels (those that portray the "bad guys"), faces (the "good guy" characters) or tweeners (characters that is neither clearly a heel or a face) as they follow a series of tension-building events, which culminated in a wrestling match or series of matches as determined by the promotion.

=== Aftermath ===
Stan Lane was announced as the replacement for Dennis Condrey (who suddenly left JCP) in the Midnight Express on April 4, 1987 on an episode of World Championship Wrestling, and would win the vacant NWA United States Tag Team Championship in May of 1987. After the tournament ended, Rick Rude would leave JCP for the WWF and the NWA World Tag Team Championship would be won by the Rock & Roll Express in a phantom match in Spokane, Washington when Ivan Koloff "substituted" for Rude. Manny Fernandez would also leave JCP for the AWA.

Jim Crockett completed his purchase of Bill Watts' UWF in April, 1987, but it would take a few months for the UWF wrestlers to make their way to JCP television, though some of them went to WWF, including Ted DiBiase and (earlier) Hacksaw Jim Duggan. Crockett also took over operations of Championship Wrestling from Florida and some of their wrestlers would begin to be on JCP's TV programs, including Mike Rotunda and Kevin Sullivan.

== Event ==
=== Tournament participants ===
Team	Notes	Ref(s).
Arn Anderson and Kevin Sullivan	Arn was originally supposed to team up with Ole Anderson, but the Horsemen kicked Ole out of the group prior to the tournament.	
The Armstrongs (Brad and Bob Armstrong)		
Giant Baba and Isao Takagi	First-round bye	
The Barbarian and Bill Dundee		
Tully Blanchard and Lex Luger	First-round bye, Blanchard held the NWA World Television Championship	
Denny Brown and Todd Champion		
Manny Fernandez and Rick Rude	First-round bye. Held the NWA World Tag Team Championship	
The Garvins (Jimmy and Ronnie Garvin)		
Mike Graham and Nelson Royal		
Tim Horner and Mike Rotunda	Rotunda held the NWA Florida Heavyweight Championship	
The Italian Stallion and Ricky Lee Jones		
Bobby Jaggers and Rocky King	King replaced Dutch Mantell	
Steve Keirn and George South		
Teijho Khan and Shaska Whatley		
Lazer Tron and Jimmy Valiant	Lazor Tron held the NWA World Junior Heavyweight Championship	
Wahoo McDaniel and Baron von Raschke		
The Midnight Express (Bobby Eaton and Stan Lane)	First-round bye	
The MOD Squad (Basher and Spike)	Held the NWA Florida Tag Team Championship	
The Mulkey Brothers (Bill and Randy Mulkey)		
The Road Warriors (Animal and Hawk)	First-round bye, held the NWA International Tag Team Championship	
The Rock 'n' Roll Express (Robert Gibson and Ricky Morton)	First-round bye	
The Russian Team (Ivan Koloff and Vladimir Petrov)	Petrov replaced Dick Murdoch who was suspended for 30 days for performing a brainbuster on Nikita Koloff on a concrete floor.	
The Super Powers (Nikita Koloff and Dusty Rhodes)	First-round bye, Koloff held the NWA United States Heavyweight Championship	
The Thunderfoots (#1 and #2)		

== Results ==
=== Non-tournament matches ===
- Ole Anderson defeated Big Bubba Rogers in a Last Man Standing Steel Cage match (April 10)
- Ric Flair defeated Barry Windham to retain the NWA World Heavyweight Championship (April 11)

=== Tournament brackets ===
First round
–	Armstrongs	W
10	Russian Team	04:14
9	MOD Squad	W
–	McDaniel/von Raschke	04:48
–	Brown/Champion	03:58
–	The Mulkeys	W
–	Keirn/South	Draw
–	Graham/Royal	20:00
–	Lazer Tron/Valiant	04:35
–	Khan/Whatley	W
–	Stallion/Jones	W
–	The Garvins	02:13
–	Jaggers/King	05:54
–	The Thunderfoots	W
–	Barbarian/Dundee	W
–	Horner/Rotunda	08:37

Second round
7	Anderson/Sullivan
–	The Armstrongs	W
9	MOD Squad
8	Luger/Blanchard	W
5	Baba/Takagi
–	Brown/Champion	W
–	BYE (draw)	N/A
4	Rock 'n' Roll Express	N/A
3	Road Warriors	W
–	Khan/Whatley
–	The Garvins
6	Midnight Express	W
1	Fernandez/Rude	W
–	The Thunderfoots
–	Barbarian/Dundee
2	Super Powers	W

Quarter Finals
–	The Armstrongs	17:46
8	Luger/Blanchard	W
5	Baba/Takagi	W
4	Rock 'n' Roll Express	00:00
3	Road Warriors	12:17
6	Midnight Express	W
1	Fernandez/Rude	09:39
2	Super Powers	W

Semi Finals
8	Luger/Blanchard	W
5	Baba/Takagi	08:38
6	Midnight Express	11:10
2	Super Powers	W

Final
8	Luger/Blanchard	17:29
2	Super Powers	W

† The Rock 'n' Roll Express were unable to compete due to an eye injury to Ricky Morton. Baba and Takagi won the match by forfeit.
