= Crockett Cup (1986) =

American professional wrestling tournament

- Cover for the official VHS release.
- Promotion(s): Jim Crockett Promotions; Universal Wrestling Federation
- Date: April 19, 1986
- City: New Orleans, Louisiana
- Venue: Louisiana Superdome
- Attendance: 3,500 (afternoon): 13,000 (evening)

Event chronology
← Previous; Starrcade	Next → The Great American Bash

Crockett Cup chronology
← Previous; First	Next → 1987

The Inaugural Jim Crockett Sr. Memorial Cup Tag Team Tournament, also referred to as Crockett Cup (1986), was held on April 19, 1986, at the Louisiana Superdome in New Orleans, Louisiana. The first portion of the event was held in the afternoon and the second portion was held in the night. The event was co-promoted by Jim Crockett Promotions (JCP) and Universal Wrestling Federation (UWF). The tournament featured 24 tag teams. The concept of the Crockett Cup was a single elimination tag team tournament, with the storyline prize of $1,000,000.00 given to the winning team along with a large trophy. The tournament was won by The Road Warriors (Animal and Hawk), as they defeated Ron Garvin and Magnum T. A. in the finals to win the tournament.

== Production ==
=== Background ===
In early 1986, the professional wrestling promotion Jim Crockett Promotions (JCP) announced that they were hosting a 2-show, 24-team tag team tournament with teams from various National Wrestling Alliance territories. The Jim Crockett Sr. Memorial Cup Tag Team Tournament (commonly known simply as the "Crockett Cup"), named in honor of JCP owner Jim Crockett Jr.'s father, "Big Jim" Crockett Sr. and The Crockett Foundation, a non-profit organization founded by Crockett Sr. in 1933. The first Crockett Cup was held in New Orleans, Louisiana in collaboration with Bill Watts' Universal Wrestling Federation who normally promoted shows in New Orleans. The 24 team event was split over two shows, held at the Superdome, split between one show in the afternoon and another in the evening.

Two non-tournament match title matches took place beyond the Crockett Cup tournament matches. The afternoon show drew 3,500 people, for a box office take of approximately $40,000, while the evening show sold 13,000 tickets for a total of $180,000. The two shows were not shown as part of JCP's weekly television shows, nor broadcast on Closed-circuit television at the time. The events were recorded, since JCP would later release the 1986 Crockett Cup as a commercial VHS videotape, featuring all matches but heavily edited down to a 2-hour video.

As of 2025 the most complete way to view the event is to watch the highlights of the first five matches from the first round from the VHS release (around 15 minutes) and then watch the rest of the event from match 6 onwards in full on the video released on the WCW YouTube channel (around 4 hours).

=== Storylines ===
The 1986 Crockett Cup shows featured a total of 25 professional wrestling matches with different wrestlers involved in pre-existing scripted feuds, plots and storylines. Wrestlers are portrayed as either heels (those that portray the "bad guys"), faces (the "good guy" characters) or tweeners (characters that is neither clearly a heel or a face) as they follow a series of tension-building events, which culminated in a wrestling match or series of matches as determined by the promotion.

==== Tournament participants ====
Team	From	Notes	Ref(s).
Four Horsemen (Arn Anderson and Tully Blanchard)	JCP	First-round bye; Blanchard held the NWA National Heavyweight Championship, Anderson held the NWA World Television Championship.	
Giant Baba and Tiger Mask	AJPW	First-round bye	
The Barbarian and Baron von Raschke	JCP		
The Batten Twins (Bart and Brad Batten)	CSW	The most recent Central States Tag Team Champions	
Black Bart and Jimmy Garvin	JCP	Black Bart was the NWA Mid-Atlantic Heavyweight Champion	
Dino Bravo and Rick Martel	Lutte	First-round bye	
Bill Dundee and Buddy Landel	CWA		
The Fabulous Ones (Steve Keirn and Stan Lane)	CWF		
The Fantastics (Bobby Fulton and Tommy Rogers)	UWF	UWF Tag Team Champions	
Manny Fernandez and Jimmy Valiant	JCP		
Ronnie Garvin and Magnum T. A.	JCP	First-round bye; Magnum held the NWA United States Heavyweight Championship	
Los Guerreros (Chavo and Hector Guerrero)	CWF		
Sam Houston and Nelson Royal	JCP		
The Italian Stallion and Koko Ware	UWF		
Bobby Jaggers and Mike Miller	PNW		
Wahoo McDaniel and Mark Youngblood	JCP		
The Midnight Express (Dennis Condrey and Bobby Eaton)	JCP	First-round bye; NWA World Tag Team Champions	
D.J. Peterson and Brett Wayne	UWF		
The Road Warriors (Animal and Hawk)	JCP	First-round bye	
The Rock 'n' Roll Express (Robert Gibson and Ricky Morton)	JCP	First-round bye	
The Russian Team (Ivan and Nikita Koloff)	JCP	First-round bye	
Buzz Sawyer and Rick Steiner	UWF		
The Sheepherders (Butch Miller and Luke Williams)	UWF		
Terry Taylor and Steve Williams	UWF	Williams was originally scheduled to team up with Ted DiBiase but DiBiase was injured at the time of the tournament	

== Event ==
=== First round ===
The first round of the Crockett Cup kicked off with a tag team match pitting Mark Youngblood and Wahoo McDaniel against Bobby Jaggers and Mike Miller. McDaniel hit a chop and elbow drop to Miller for the win.

Next, Nelson Royal and Sam Houston took on The Batten Twins (Bart and Brad). Houston hit a bulldog to Bart Batten for the win.

Next, Jimmy Valiant and Manny Fernandez took on Baron von Raschke and The Barbarian. Fernandez pinned Barbarian with a sunset flip for the win.

Next, Steve Williams and Terry Taylor took on Bill Dundee and Buddy Landel. Williams nailed an Oklahoma Stampede to Landel for the win.

Next, Chavo Guerrero and Hector Guerrero took on The Sheepherders (Butch and Luke). Sheepherders hit a double clothesline to Hector for the win.

Next, The Fantastics (Bobby Fulton and Tommy Rogers) took on The Fabulous Ones (Stan Lane and Steve Keirn). Fulton pinned Keirn with a roll-up after Rogers jumped out of a back suplex to Keirn.

Next, Buzz Sawyer and Rick Steiner took on Koko Ware and The Italian Stallion. Sawyer hit a powerslam to Stallion for the win.

The final first round match pitted Brett Sawyer and David Peterson against Black Bart and Jimmy Garvin. Bart delivered a leg drop to Peterson and Garvin followed with a brainbuster for the win.

=== Second round ===
The second round of the tournament kicked off with a match pitting the advancing Nelson Royal and Sam Houston against The Midnight Express (Bobby Eaton and Dennis Condrey). Royal applied an abdominal stretch on Condrey until Eaton hit a diving double axe handle to Royal behind the referee's back allowing Condrey to pin him for the win.

Next, Buzz Sawyer and Rick Steiner took on Magnum T. A. and Ron Garvin. After being double teamed by Sawyer and Steiner, Garvin tagged in T. A., who nailed a belly to belly suplex to Steiner for the win.

Next, Mark Youngblood and Wahoo McDaniel took on The Road Warriors (Animal and Hawk). Hawk hit a flying clothesline to Youngblood from the middle rope for the win.

Next, Jimmy Valiant and Manny Fernandez took on The Russians (Ivan Koloff and Nikita Koloff). Valiant had applied a sleeper hold on Ivan until Nikita hit a Russian Sickle to Valiant allowing Ivan to pin him for the win.

Steve Williams and Terry Taylor were scheduled to take on Dino Bravo and Rick Martel in the next match but Bravo had to be treated for appendicitis due to which Bravo was unable to show up and Martel was forced to forfeit the match, allowing Williams and Taylor to advance to the quarterfinal.

Next, The Rock 'n' Roll Express (Ricky Morton and Robert Gibson) took on The Sheepherders. Rock 'n' Roll Express was disqualified when Jack Victory tried to interfere in the match with the New Zealand flag but Morton hit him with the flagpole. Rock 'n' Roll Express argued with the referee over the decision and allowed Sheepherders to advance to the quarterfinal.

Next, The Fantastics took on the team of Arn Anderson and Tully Blanchard. Bobby Fulton dropkicked Anderson as Anderson tried to slam Tommy Rogers allowing Rogers to fall on top of Anderson and pin him for the win.

It was followed by the last match in the second round which pitted Giant Baba and Tiger Mask against Black Bart and Jimmy Garvin. Tiger Mask hit a diving crossbody to Bart allowing Baba to hit a big boot to Bart's chest for the win.

=== Quarterfinals ===
The Quarter Finals began with The Road Warriors taking on The Midnight Express. Midnight Express utilized many dirty tactics but were unable to win which led to their manager Jim Cornette hitting Road Warrior Animal with his tennis racket, leading to Midnight Express getting disqualified and Road Warriors advancing to the semifinal.

Next, Steve Williams and Terry Taylor took on Ivan Koloff and Nikita Koloff. The match ended in a twenty-minute time limit draw. Koloffs and Korstia Korchenko attacked Williams after the match.

Next, The Fantastics took on The Sheepherders. The referee got knocked out and a brawl occurred between the four teams after Jack Victory tossed a flagpole into the ring. The usage of flagpole and the brawl would lead to both teams getting disqualified and eliminated from the tournament.

It was followed by the final Quarter Final match in which Magnum T. A. and Ron Garvin took on Giant Baba and Tiger Mask. Magnum countered a diving crossbody by Mask into a belly to belly suplex for the win.

The earlier time limit draw and double disqualification meant that two extra teams had been eliminated in the Quarter Final phase, therefore the remaining two teams of the Road Warriors and Magnum and Garvin progressed straight to the final.

=== Non-tournament matches ===
Before the finals, two non-tournament matches took place. In the first, Jim Duggan defended the Mid-South North American Heavyweight Championship against Dick Slater. Duggan countered a piledriver attempt by Slater by backdropping him but got trapped in the ropes. Slater tried to advance towards him but the referee stopped him which allowed Duggan to hit a three-point stance clothesline to Slater to retain the title.

In the following match, Ric Flair defended the NWA World Heavyweight Championship against Dusty Rhodes. The referee got knocked out which allowed Flair to take off Rhodes' protective boot and hit him with it for a near-fall. Flair tried to hit Baby Doll which led to Rhodes hitting him with the boot and getting disqualified. He proceeded to hit the referee with it as well and left with Flair's title belt.

=== Final ===
The final of the Crockett Cup took place pitting Road Warriors against Magnum T. A. and Ron Garvin. Garvin hurt his injured hand by hitting Road Warrior Hawk in the face and tended to his hand which allowed Road Warrior Animal to hit a lariat to Garvin to win the match and the Crockett Cup in the process.

== Aftermath ==
On June 20, 2019, a four-hour video of the tournament, starting at match 6 of the first round, was added to the WWE Network as a Hidden Gem. This was later added to the WCW YouTube channel in 2025 for free viewing. This version includes no TV commentary as commentary was only originally recorded for the heavily edited 2 VHS release, so could not be transferred to this more complete version.

== Results ==
Afternoon Show Results
No.	Results	Stipulations	Times
1	Mark Youngblood and Wahoo McDaniel defeated Bobby Jaggers and Mike Miller	Crockett Cup first round tag team match	7:35
2	Nelson Royal and Sam Houston defeated The Batten Twins (Bart and Brad)	Crockett Cup first round tag team match	8:07
3	Jimmy Valiant and Manny Fernandez defeated Baron von Raschke and The Barbarian (with Paul Jones and Shaska Whatley)	Crockett Cup first round tag team match	11:20
4	Steve Williams and Terry Taylor defeated Bill Dundee and Buddy Landel	Crockett Cup first round tag team match	12:00
5	The Sheepherders (Butch and Luke) (with Jack Victory) defeated Chavo Guerrero and Hector Guerrero	Crockett Cup first round tag team match	11:12
6	The Fantastics (Bobby Fulton and Tommy Rogers) defeated The Fabulous Ones (Stan Lane and Steve Keirn)	Crockett Cup first round tag team match	13:10
7	Buzz Sawyer and Rick Steiner defeated Koko Ware and The Italian Stallion	Crockett Cup first round tag team match	15:05
8	Black Bart and Jimmy Garvin (with Precious) defeated Brett Sawyer and David Peterson	Crockett Cup first round tag team match	6:35
9	The Midnight Express (Bobby Eaton and Dennis Condrey) (with Jim Cornette) defeated Nelson Royal and Sam Houston	Crockett Cup second round tag team match	1:50
10	Magnum T. A. and Ron Garvin defeated Buzz Sawyer and Rick Steiner	Crockett Cup second round tag team match	5:05

Evening Show Results
No.	Results	Stipulations	Times
1	The Road Warriors (Animal and Hawk) (with Paul Ellering) defeated Mark Youngblood and Wahoo McDaniel	Crockett Cup second round tag team match	6:20
2	The Russians (Ivan Koloff and Nikita Koloff) defeated Jimmy Valiant and Manny Fernandez	Crockett Cup second round tag team match	9:00
3	Steve Williams and Terry Taylor defeated Dino Bravo and Rick Martel by forfeit	Crockett Cup second round tag team match	—
4	The Sheepherders (Butch and Luke) (with Jack Victory) defeated The Rock 'n' Roll Express (Ricky Morton and Robert Gibson) by disqualification	Crockett Cup second round tag team match	8:10
5	The Fantastics (Bobby Fulton and Tommy Rogers) defeated Arn Anderson and Tully Blanchard (with J. J. Dillon)	Crockett Cup second round tag team match	11:02
6	Giant Baba and Tiger Mask defeated Black Bart and Jimmy Garvin (with Precious)	Crockett Cup second round tag team match	6:05
7	The Road Warriors (Animal and Hawk) (with Paul Ellering) defeated The Midnight Express (Bobby Eaton and Dennis Condrey) (with Jim Cornette) by disqualification	Crockett Cup quarterfinal tag team match	10:30
8	Steve Williams and Terry Taylor vs. The Russians (Ivan Koloff & Nikita Koloff) ended in a time limit draw	Crockett Cup quarterfinal tag team match	20:00
9	The Fantastics (Bobby Fulton and Tommy Rogers) vs. The Sheepherders (Butch and Luke) (with Jack Victory) ended in a double disqualification	Crockett Cup quarterfinal tag team match	15:45
10	Magnum T. A. and Ron Garvin defeated Giant Baba and Tiger Mask	Crockett Cup quarterfinal tag team match	13:12
11	Jim Duggan (c) defeated Dick Slater	Singles match for the Mid-South North American Heavyweight Championship	10:07
12	Ric Flair (c) defeated Dusty Rhodes (with Baby Doll) by disqualification	Singles match for the NWA World Heavyweight Championship	22:15
13	The Road Warriors (Animal and Hawk) (with Paul Ellering) defeated Magnum T. A. and Ron Garvin	Crockett Cup final tag team match	9:18
(c) / – the champion(s) heading into the match

=== Tournament brackets ===
First round
–	McDaniel/Youngblood	W
–	Jaggers/Miller	07:35
–	Houston/Royal	W
–	Batten Twins	08:07
–	Fabulous Ones	13:10
–	Fantastics	W
–	Guerreros	11:12
–	Sheepherders	W
–	Barbarian/Von Raschke	11:20
–	Fernandez/Valiant	W
–	Taylor/Williams	W
Dundee/Landel	12:00
–	Stallion/Ware	15:05
–	Sawyer/Steiner	W
–	Peterson/Wayne	6:35
–	Bart/Garvin	W

Second round
–	Road Warriors	W
–	McDaniel/Youngblood	6:20
–	Houston/Royal	1:50
–	Midnight Express	W
–	Anderson/Blanchard	11:02
–	Fantastics	W
–	Sheepherders	DQ
–	Rock 'n' Roll Express	8:10
–	Russian Team	W
–	Fernandez/Valiant	9:00
–	Taylor/Williams	W
–	Bravo/Martel	forfeit
–	Garvin/Magnum	W
–	Sawyer/Steiner	5:05
–	Bart/Garvin	6:05
–	Baba/Tiger Mask	W

Quarter Finals
–	Road Warriors	W
–	Midnight Express	10:30
–	Fantastics	DDQ
–	Sheepherders	15:45
–	Russian Team	Draw
–	Taylor/Williams	20:00
–	Garvin/Magnum	W
–	Baba/Tiger Mask	13:12

Semi Finals
–	Road Warriors	W
–	BYE (double-DQ)	N/A
–	BYE (draw)	N/A
–	Garvin/Magnum	W

Final
–	Road Warriors	W
–	Garvin/Magnum	9:18
