= Crockett Cup (2020) =

National Wrestling Alliance professional wrestling show

- Official poster featuring Nick Aldis and Marty Scurll
- Promotion: National Wrestling Alliance
- Date: April 19, 2020 (cancelled)
- City: College Park, Georgia
- Venue: Gateway Center Arena

Event chronology
← Previous; Hard Times	Next → Back For The Attack

Crockett Cup chronology
← Previous; 2019	Next → —

The Fifth Annual Jim Crockett Sr. Memorial Cup Tag Team Tournament, also known as the Crockett Cup, was a scheduled professional wrestling tag team tournament that was to be produced by the National Wrestling Alliance (NWA). The event was scheduled to take place on April 19, 2020, at the Gateway Center Arena in College Park, Georgia, but was postponed due to the COVID-19 pandemic before ultimately being canceled.

In addition to the tournament, the event was booked to have NWA Worlds Heavyweight Champion Nick Aldis defend the championship against Ring of Honor (ROH) representative Marty Scurll, with the latter agreeing to pay Aldis $500,000 if he lost the match. Due to the pandemic, the championship match never took place and Scurll left ROH in January 2021.

== Production ==
=== Background ===
The Jim Crockett Sr. Memorial Cup Tag Team Tournament is a tag team tournament first held in April 1986. National Wrestling Alliance (NWA) member Jim Crockett Promotions (JCP), headed by Jim Crockett Jr., hosted the Crockett Cup, held in honor of Crockett's father, JCP founder Jim Crockett Sr. and saw participation of teams from various NWA territories. JCP held the tournament again in 1987 and 1988, before JCP was sold to Ted Turner later that year. In July 2017, the Crockett Foundation, with Classic Pro Wrestling, held the "Crockett Foundation Cup Tag Team Tournament" in New Kent, Virginia, which was not affiliated with the NWA. Bobby Fulton, The Barbarian, and The Rock 'n' Roll Express, all former Crockett Cup participants, took part in the event as a link to the original tournaments.

The original concept of the Crockett Cup was a single elimination tag team tournament, with the storyline prize of $1,000,000.00 given to the winning team along with a large trophy. The 1986 and 1987 tournaments featured 24 teams, while the 1988 version had 22 teams competing. Each tournament was split over two shows to encompass all 23 tournament matches as well as non-tournament matches; in 1986, JCP held a show in the afternoon and another in the evening, while the 1987 and 1988, the tournament was spread out over two days instead.

The Crockett Cup returned in April 2019, after a thirty-one year absence, and was jointly promoted by the NWA and Ring of Honor (ROH). As such, the winning team would also win the vacant NWA World Tag Team Championship. In the end, Villain Enterprises (Brody King and PCO) defeated Royce Isaacs and Thomas Lattimer to win the cup and the championship. During the NWA's Hard Times pay-per-view (PPV) in January 2020, it was announced that the Crockett Cup would return for its second consecutive year and would be held in April.

==== Impact of the COVID-19 pandemic ====
As a result of the COVID-19 pandemic, which began in March 2020, many professional wrestling promotions began canceling or postponing their scheduled events, with some holding events behind closed doors. NWA suspended tapings for its upcoming episodes of NWA Power as well as the Crockett Cup. By May, however, the Crockett Cup was canceled, according to PWInsider. The NWA instead streamed the remainder of content that was planned as the "go home" show for the Crockett Cup as a special called "Super Power" on May 12. As the NWA Worlds Heavyweight Championship match never got to take place, this special saw Strictly Business (NWA World Heavyweight Champion Nick Aldis and Thomas Latimer) face ROH's Villain Enterprises (Marty Scurll and Brody King) in the main event.

=== Storylines ===
The event would have featured a number professional wrestling matches with different wrestlers involved in pre-existing scripted feuds, plots, and storylines. Wrestlers are portrayed as either heels (those that portray the "bad guys"), faces (the "good guy" characters), or tweeners (characters that are neither clearly a heel or a face) as they follow a series of tension-building events, which culminate in a wrestling match or series of matches as determined by the promotion. The third season of NWA's weekly flagship program, Power, featured storylines that were leading up to the event before its cancellation.

In the main event of 2019's Crockett Cup, Marty Scurll had challenged Nick Aldis for the NWA Worlds Heavyweight Championship in a losing effort. On December 14, 2019, Scurll made a surprise appearance at NWA's Into the Fire PPV, after Aldis successfully defended the championship against James Storm in the main event. Scurll laid out a challenge to Aldis, which Aldis did not respond to during the show. Over subsequent episodes of NWA Power, Scurll continued to challenge Aldis, leading to Aldis, Royce Isaacs, and Thomas Latimer, known together Strictly Business, to make appearances at recent ROH events, where they attacked Scurll and other members of Villain Enterprises. At NWA's Hard Times pay-per-view, Aldis defeated Villain Enterprises stablemate Flip Gordon. In subsequent interviews, Aldis stated that he would not grant Scurll another title match unless Scurll promised to refund everyone's ticket purchases if he lost the match. Scurll later countered the stipulation, stating that he would personally pay Aldis $500,000 if he lost the match.

=== Aftermath ===
During the Speaking Out movement in July 2020, Scurll was accused of taking advantage of a 16-year-old girl who was inebriated. Scurll would release two statements in which he did not deny the allegations, but claimed the encounter was consensual. On June 25, Ring of Honor announced that they had launched an investigation concerning the allegations. Scurll was removed from ROH's roster in October and left ROH in January 2021. At UWN Primetime Live, a weekly PPV hosted by United Wrestling Network, Trevor Murdoch defeated Aron Stevens to win the NWA National Championship.

=== Participants ===
- Mexa Squad (Flamita and Rey Horus)
- The Rock 'n' Roll Express (Ricky Morton and Robert Gibson)
- Villain Enterprises (Brody King and Flip Gordon)
- The Wild Cards (Thomas Latimer and Royce Isaacs)

=== Wild card Battle Royal participants ===
- Tim Storm
- Ricky Starks
- Zicky Dice

== Scheduled matches ==
No.	Matches*	Stipulations
1	Nick Aldis (c) vs. Marty Scurll ($)	Championship vs. $500,000 match for the NWA World Heavyweight Championship
2	Aron Stevens (c) vs. Trevor Murdoch	Singles match for the NWA National Championship
(c) / – the champion(s) heading into the match; *Card subject to change

== See also ==
- 2020 in professional wrestling
