= David Crockett (wrestling) =

American professional wrestling commentator, executive

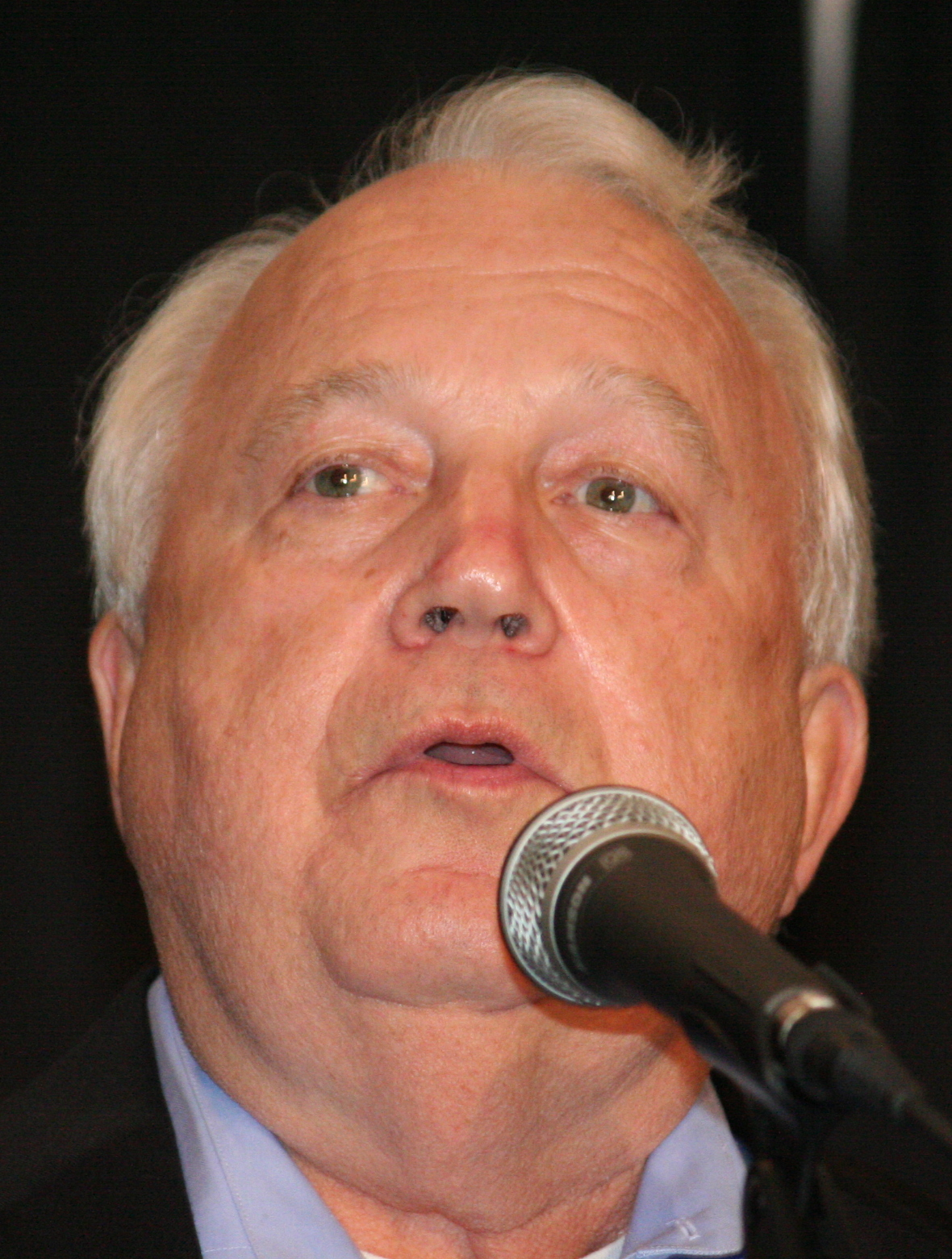

Personal information
- Born: David Finley Crockett; 1946 (age 79–80) Charlotte, North Carolina, U.S.
- Spouse: Valerie Crockett
- Children: 2

Professional wrestling career
- Ring name(s): David Crockett; Dave Finley
- Debut: 1973
- Retired: 1988

David Finley Crockett is an American former professional wrestling announcer and executive.

== Career ==
Crockett (left) interviewing the Varsity Club, c. 1988

Crockett was usually paired in announcing duties with Tony Schiavone, with Crockett providing pro-babyface color commentary and Schiavone providing play-by-play announcing. From 1985 to 1988, Crockett and Schiavone were the announcing team for NWA World Championship Wrestling. David Crockett is remembered for being clotheslined by Nikita Koloff on World Wide Wrestling in 1985 in Asheville, North Carolina. This led to Ric Flair coming to Crockett's aid, resulting in the second Flair/Koloff feud (they had a short-lived feud a year earlier in 1984 as the Mid-Atlantic and Georgia territories were merging under new booker, Dusty Rhodes) and their money-making bout at The Great American Bash 1985, held at the American Legion Memorial Stadium in Charlotte.

When Jim Ross joined the show in 1988, Crockett stayed on but later left to become an executive producer for World Championship Wrestling television programming. Crockett also worked with Bob Caudle on Mid-Atlantic Championship Wrestling.

Since 2021, Crockett has been involved in some All Elite Wrestling events in the Crockett territory, which occurred during AEW Holiday Bash in Greensboro and AEW Battle of the Belts in Charlotte, with the events held in Crockett-era venues. He also made an appearance on the January 12, 2022 episode of AEW Dynamite in Raleigh, which was held in the PNC Arena. On March 3, 2024, Crockett was interviewed during the pre show prior to the Revolution pay-per-view due to the event being held at the Greensboro Coliseum.

Crockett had a brief career in 1971 to 1973 as a professional wrestler under the ring name Dave Finley.

== Personal life ==
Crockett is the son of wrestling promoter Jim Crockett and brother to Jim Crockett Jr., also a professional wrestling promoter.

Crockett was on board a private airplane that crashed on October 4, 1975 that also had Johnny Valentine, Bob Bruggers, Tim Woods, Ric Flair, and pilot Joseph Michael Farkus on board. Farkus was killed in the crash and the passengers injured; Crockett was the least injured of those on board the plane.

== Awards and accomplishments ==
- George Tragos/Lou Thesz Professional Wrestling Hall of Fame
  - Gordon Solie Award (2025)
- Wrestling Observer Newsletter
  - Most Obnoxious (1982, 1987)
  - Worst Television Announcer (1986–1988)
