= NWA New Years Clash =

2019 National Wrestling Alliance event

- Official poster for the event with various wrestlers
- Promotions: National Wrestling Alliance; Tried-N-True Wrestling
- Date: January 5, 2019 (aired April 12, 2019)
- City: Clarksville, Tennessee
- Venue: Wilma Rudolph Event Center
- Attendance: 1,149

Event chronology
| ← Previous; NWA 70th Anniversary Show | Next → Crockett Cup |

Pop-Up Event chronology
| ← Previous; First | Next → By Any Means Necessary |

The NWA New Years Clash, part of the NWA Pop-Up Event series, was a professional wrestling supercard show that took place on January 5, 2019 at the Wilma Rudolph Event Center in Clarksville, Tennessee and aired as a pay-per-view event on FITE TV on April 12, 2019. This was the second event produced directly under the National Wrestling Alliance banner since Billy Corgan became the new owner of the organization in May 2017, following the NWA 70th Anniversary Show. The event was co-produced with Tried-N-True Pro Wrestling (TNT) based in Tennessee.

In the main event of the seven-match show, reigning NWA World Heavyweight Champion Nick Aldis successfully defended the championship against James Storm. Other notable matches saw Willie Mack defend the NWA National Championship against Matt Cross and NWA World Women's Champion Jazz lose to Allie by disqualification and thus retained her championship. David Arquette and Tim Storm defeated The Kingdom of Jocephus (Jocephus and the Spiritual Advisor), after which Jocephus had all his hair shaved off. The War Kings (Crimson and Jax Dane) qualified for the 2019 Crockett Cup and Crazzy Steve won the TNT Championship.

== Production ==
Other on-screen personnel
| Role: | Name: |
|---|---|
| Commentators | Jim Cornette |
| Commentators | Joe Galli |
| Commentators | Tony Schiavone |
| Ring announcers | Cyrus Fees |
| Referees | Earl Hebner |
| Referees | Brian Hebner |
| Interviewers | Jenn Decker |

=== Background ===
The New Years Clash event was the first of a series of shows called NWA Pop-Up Event presented and scripted by the National Wrestling Alliance (NWA). The NWA Pop-Up Event concept was first announced in December 2018, with the New Years Clash being held as a co-promoted event with Anthony Mayweather's (wrestling under the ring name "Crimson") Tried-N-True Wrestling based in Tennessee, crediting them with building a good reputation locally. During a press conference in January 2019 NWA president Billy Corgan explained the "Pop-Up" concept as "Being able to work, show up anywhere in the world that appreciates moments", partnering with local promotions, and that the New Years Clash was just the first of a series of shows the NWA is working on.

=== Storylines ===
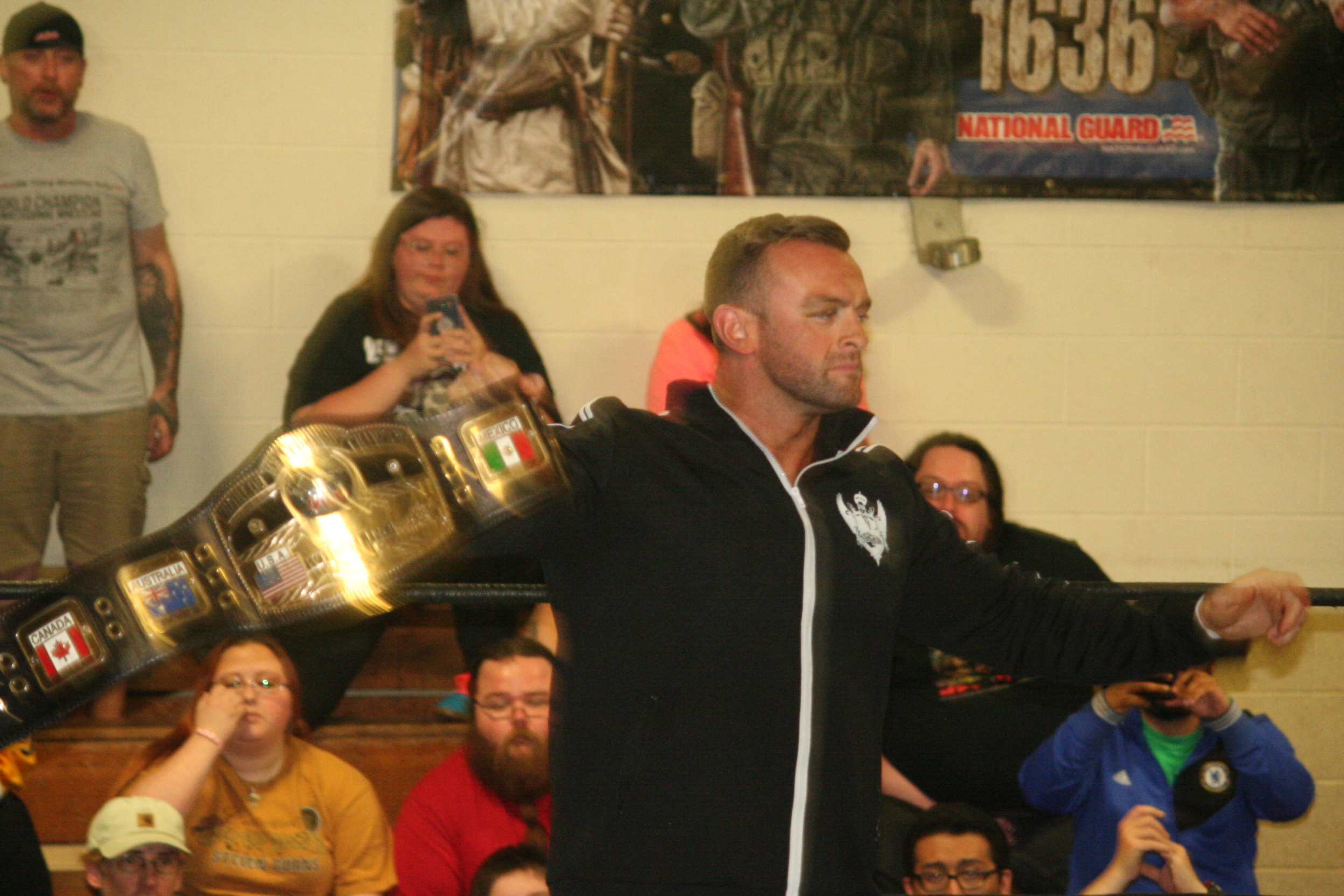
Nick Aldis, holding the NWA World Heavyweight Champion belt

The New Years Clash event featured seven professional wrestling matches scripted by the NWA and TNT, with some of wrestlers involved in scripted feuds leading to the matches. The wrestlers portray either heels (those that play the part of the "bad guys"), faces ('the "good guy" characters) or "Tweeners" (who straddle the definition of Face of Heel) as they perform in and out of the ring. Promotional efforts were done via social media such as Twitter (#NWAPopUp), press releases, and press conferences. Storylines were also played out during the NWA's Ten Pounds of Gold documentary series on YouTube.

Nick Aldis won the NWA World Heavyweight Championship for the second time on October 21, 2018, when he defeated Cody for the championship in the main event of the NWA 70th Anniversary Show. In December 2018 the "New Years Clash" event was announced and revealed that James Storm would be getting a championship match in his hometown against Aldis. Over the following weeks both Aldis and Storm hyped the upcoming match via videos posted by the NWA on their social media accounts.

One of the most publicized storylines leading up to New Years Clash involved actor-turned-wrestler David Arquette. In 2018 Arquette began wrestling on the independent circuit. In November he worked wrestled in a "death match" against Nick Gage. During that match Arquette was cut in the neck by Gage, causing him to bleed profusely. Arquette was hospitalized after the match, requiring surgery to stop the bleeding. In the aftermath wrestler Jocephus, who portrays a cult leader like figure offered Arquette "Absolution" if he joined the Kingdom of Jocephus, a request Arquette turned down. After taunting each other over social media the NWA announced that Arquette and a partner of his choice would wrestle Jocephus and a partner at New Years Clash, with both men putting their hair on the line. Jocephus' partner was a bald, silent woman simply referred to as "The Spiritual Advisor", while Arquette did not reveal who his partner was prior to the show.

It had been announced prior to the show that Maxx Stardom, Rosemary and the War Kings (Crimson and Jax Dane) would all wrestle at the show but did not announce their opponents prior to the event starting. Rosemary did not wrestle at the event with no explanation being given for the change.

== Event ==
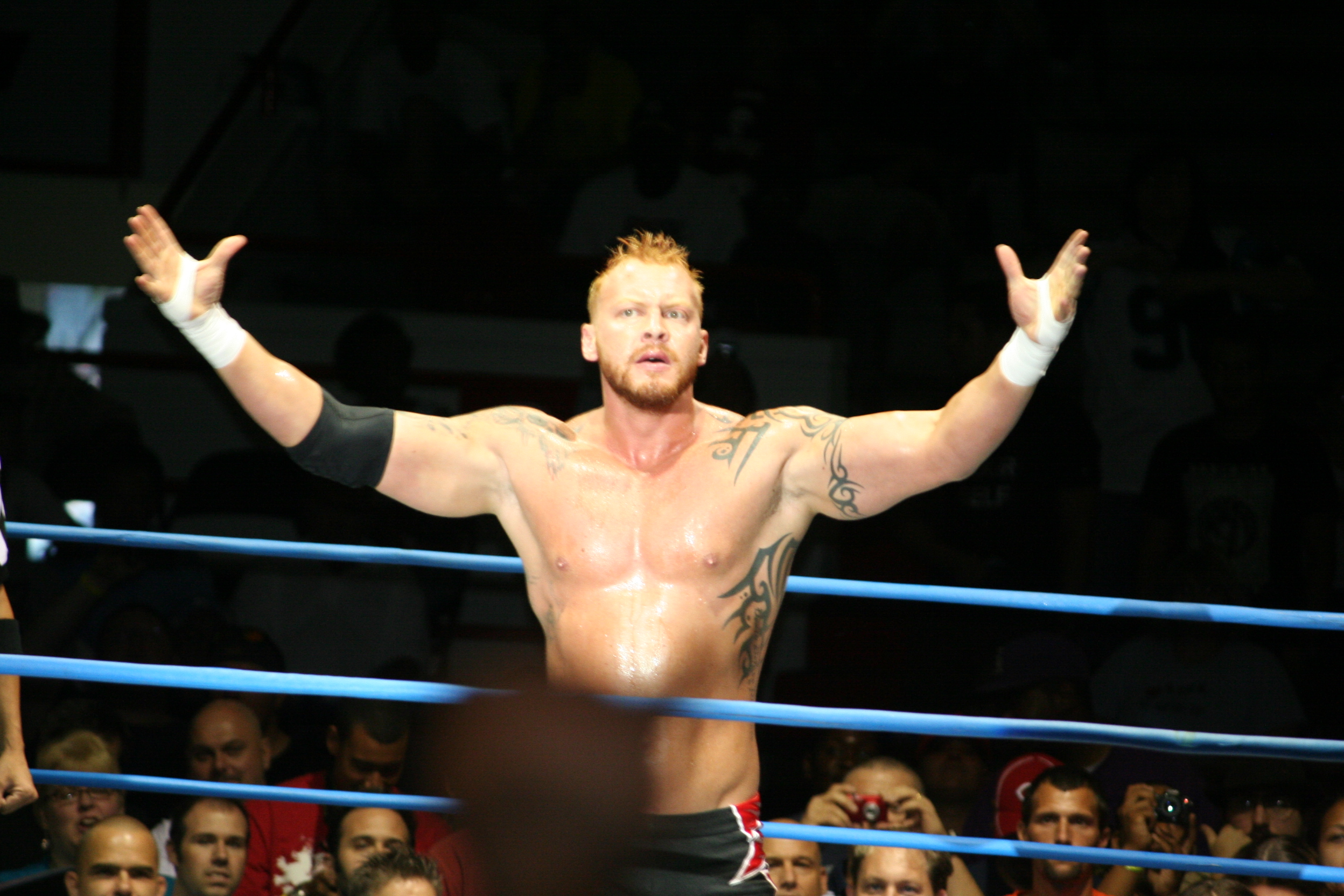
Crimson, who co-promoted the show and qualified for the Crockett Cup with Jax Dane.

In the second match of the night, The War Kings (Crimson and Jax Dane) was accompanied by Road Warrior Animal as they were set to face a team that had not been announced prior to the match. Before the team was introduced it was announced that the winning team would qualify for the 2019 Crockett Cup tournament on April 27, 2019. The War Kings faced, and defeated the team of Caleb Konley and Jay Bradley to become the first team to qualify for the tournament.

Despite losing her match to Allie, Jazz remained NWA World Women's Champion as she lost by disqualification, and under NWA rules a championship cannot change hands that way.

For his match with Jocephus and his Spiritual Advisor, David Arquette introduced his surprise partner, former NWA World Heavyweight Champion Tim Storm. In the end, Arquette pinned Jocephus to win the match. Jocephus later had both his long hair and most of his bushy beard shaved off backstage by Arquette and Storm. The hair shaving was shown live on NWA's Instagram account.

In the semi-main event, Willie Mack made his second successful defense of the NWA National Heavyweight Championship by defeating Matt Cross.

In the main even Nick Aldis made his eighth successful championship defense of his ongoing championship reign, by pinning James Storm.

== Aftermath ==
After successfully retaining the NWA World Heavyweight Championship, Aldis is scheduled to defend the belt against PJ Black as part of Ring of Honor's Atlanta show on January 12.

== Results ==
| No. | Results | Stipulations | Times |
|---|---|---|---|
| 1 | Maxx Stardom (w/ Salina de la Renta) defeated Jeremiah Plunkett | Singles match | 6:46 |
| 2 | The War Kings (Crimson and Jax Dane) (w/ Road Warrior Animal) defeated Caleb Konley and Jay Bradley | Tag team match to qualify for the 2019 Crockett Cup | 7:31 |
| 3 | Crazzy Steve defeated Samuel Shaw (c) | Loser Leaves TNT No Disqualification match for the Tried-N-True Championship | 1:22 |
| 4 | Allie defeated Jazz (c) by disqualification | Singles match for the NWA Women's Championship | 13:26 |
| 5 | David Arquette and Tim Storm defeated The Kingdom of Jocephus (Jocephus and the Spiritual Advisor) | David Arquette's hair vs. Jocephus' hair tag team match | 12:36 |
| 6 | Willie Mack (c) defeated Matt Cross | Singles match for the NWA National Championship | 15:09 |
| 7 | Nick Aldis (c) (with Kamille) defeated James Storm | Singles match for the NWA Worlds Heavyweight Championship | 25:35 |
(c) / – the champion(s) heading into the match

== See also ==
- 2019 in professional wrestling
