= NWA PowerrrTrip =

2022 National Wrestling Alliance event

- Official poster featuring various NWA wrestlers
- Promotions: National Wrestling Alliance; Tried-N-True Wrestling
- Date: February 12, 2022
- City: Oak Grove, Kentucky
- Venue: Valor Hall

Pop-Up Event chronology
← Previous; Duuuval Brawl 4	Next → PowerrrTrip 2

PowerrrTrip chronology
← Previous; First	Next → 2

NWA PowerrrTrip, part of the NWA Pop-Up Event series, was a professional wrestling supercard produced by the National Wrestling Alliance (NWA) in conjunction with Tried-N-True Pro Wrestling. The event took place on February 12, at the Valor Hall in Oak Grove, Kentucky. The event was a taping for NWA Powerrr on FITE TV.

== Production ==
=== Storylines ===
The event featured professional wrestling matches that involved different wrestlers from pre-existing scripted feuds and storylines. Wrestlers portrayed heroes, villains, or less distinguishable characters in scripted events that built tension and culminated in a wrestling match or series of matches. Storylines were produced during the seventh season of the NWA's weekly web series, Powerrr.

At By Any Means Necessary, The OGK (Matt Taven and Mike Bennett) made their NWA debut, defeating The Fixers (Jay Bradley and Wrecking Ball Legursky). Since then, the two teams, along with The Fixers' ally Colby Corino, would be involved in a long feud. At PowerrrTrip, The OGK and The Fixers will face each other in a "Kentucky Sweethearts Brawl" (no countouts, no disqualifications, falls count anywhere). At the event, NWA President Billy Corgan turned the match into a Crockett Cup first round match

At Hard Times 2, Nick Aldis defeated Thom Latimer. Despite the win, Aldis would continue to be at odds with his former Strictly Business teammate. On January 20, it was announced that Aldis and Latimer will face each other again in an "I quit" match.

At Hard Times 2, Trevor Murdoch defeated Mike Knox to retain the NWA Worlds Heavyweight Championship. After the match, Matt Cardona made his NWA debut, appearing in the crowd and distracting Murdoch just enough for Knox to jump Murdoch from behind. The Pope would try and intervene, but Cardona would attack him as well and throw him into the ring steps, injuring Pope for the better part of two months. Cardona would then stand over a fallen Murdoch and hold the championship over his prone body. Over the following weeks, Cardona and Knox would lambast the NWA, calling it "old and outdated"; while proclaiming they were here to "save" the NWA, saying its presentation should be upgraded to have entranceways, pyrotechnics, titantrons, and entrance music. Cardona would also slander Murdoch's name, saying that he hazed and disrespected him backstage when he first got his start. Tired of Cardona and Knox's antics, Murdoch would battle Knox in a title rematch on the February 1 episode of Powerrr, which Murdoch won again. However, Knox and Cardona once again laid Murdoch out, ending with Cardona holding the title over Murdoch for the second time. On February 4, NWA president Billy Corgan announced two more matches for PowerrrTrip. First, The Pope will return to take on Mike Knox, and then Murdoch would finally face Cardona in an NWA Worlds Heavyweight Championship match.

== Results ==
No.	Results	Stipulations	Times
1^{D}	"Magic" Jake Dumas defeated AJ Cazana by pinfall	Singles match (Note: The match was taped for NWA USA.)	3:14
2	Chelsea Green defeated Kenzie Paige by pinfall	Singles match	7:24
3	Jax Dane defeated Eric Jackson by pinfall	Singles match	1:26
4	The Fixers (Jay Bradley and Wrecking Ball Legursky) defeated The OGK (Matt Taven and Mike Bennett) by pinfall	2022 Crockett Cup first round match	10:47
5	Colby Corino defeated Rhett Titus (2-1)	Two-out-of-three falls match	16:55
6	Mike Knox defeated The Pope by pinfall	Singles match	11:55
7	Idolmania Sports Management (Tyrus, BLK Jeez, Jordan Clearwater, and Marshe Rockett) (with Austin Idol) defeated Cyon, Mims, and The Ill Begotten (Alex Taylor and Rush Freeman) by Pinfall	Eight-man tag team match	6:59
8	Anthony Mayweather defeated Chris Adonis (c) by pinfall	Singles match for the NWA National Championship	11:38
9	Nick Aldis defeated Thom Latimer by technical submission	"I Quit" match	13:38
10	Kamille (c) defeated Taryn Terrell by pinfall	Singles match for the NWA World Women's Championship	7:48
11	Matt Cardona defeated Trevor Murdoch (c) by pinfall	Singles match for the NWA Worlds Heavyweight Championship	11:05
(c) / – the champion(s) heading into the match; D / – this was a dark match
