= Crockett Cup (2019) =

National Wrestling Alliance and Ring of Honor event

- Promotional poster featuring Nick Aldis and Marty Scurll
- Promotions: National Wrestling Alliance; Ring of Honor
- Date: April 27, 2019
- City: Concord, North Carolina
- Venue: Cabarrus Arena
- Attendance: 1,300

Event chronology
← Previous; New Years Clash	Next → Into the Fire

Crockett Cup chronology
← Previous; 1988	Next → 2022

Ring of Honor events chronology
← Previous; Masters of the Craft	Next → War of the Worlds

The Fourth Annual Jim Crockett Sr. Memorial Cup Tag Team Tournament, or more commonly the Crockett Cup (2019), was a professional wrestling tournament that took place on April 27, 2019, at the Cabarrus Arena in Concord, North Carolina. The eight team single elimination tournament was co-produced by the National Wrestling Alliance (NWA) and Ring of Honor (ROH).

Also on the card, Nick Aldis defended the NWA World Heavyweight Championship against Marty Scurll, and the NWA Women's Championship and NWA National Championship were also defended.

== Production ==
Other on-screen personnel
Role:	Name:
Commentators	Jim Cornette
Commentators	Joe Galli
Commentators	Ian Riccaboni
Ring announcers	Cyrus Fees
Referees	Earl Hebner
Referees	Brian Hebner
Interviewers	Jenn Decker

=== Background ===
The Jim Crockett Sr. Memorial Cup Tag Team Tournament (commonly known simply as the Crockett Cup) is a tag team professional wrestling tournament first held in April 1986. National Wrestling Alliance (NWA) member Jim Crockett Promotions (JCP), headed by Jim Crockett Jr., hosted the Crockett Cup, held in honor of Crockett's father, JCP founder Jim Crockett Sr. and saw participation of teams from various NWA territories. JCP held the tournament again in 1987 and 1988, before JCP was sold to Ted Turner later that year. In July 2017, the Crockett Foundation, with Classic Pro Wrestling, held the "Crockett Foundation Cup Tag Team Tournament" in New Kent, Virginia, which was not affiliated with the NWA. Bobby Fulton, The Barbarian, and The Rock 'n' Roll Express, all former Crockett Cup participants, took part in the event as a link to the original tournaments.

The original concept of the Crockett Cup was a single elimination tag team tournament, with the storyline prize of $1,000,000.00 given to the winning team along with a large trophy. The 1986 and 1987 tournaments featured 24 teams, while the 1988 version had 22 teams competing. Each tournament was split over 2 shows to encompass all 23 tournament matches as well as non-tournament matches, in 1986 JCP held a show in the afternoon and another in the evening, while the 1987 and 1988 tournaments were spread out over two days instead.

In October 2018, during the NWA 70th Anniversary Show, it was announced that the Crockett Cup would be returning in 2019. It was later revealed that the event would take place on April 27, 2019, at Cabarrus Arena in Concord, North Carolina. The event will be co-produced by the NWA and Ring of Honor (ROH).

=== Storylines ===
The event featured a number professional wrestling matches with different wrestlers involved in pre-existing scripted feuds, plots and storylines. Wrestlers are portrayed as either heels (those that portray the "bad guys"), faces (the "good guy" characters) or tweeners (characters that is neither clearly a heel or a face) as they follow a series of tension-building events, which culminated in a wrestling match or series of matches as determined by the promotion.

At the NWA New Years Clash, The War Kings (Crimson and Jax Dane) (with Road Warrior Animal) defeated Caleb Konley and Jay Bradley to become the first team to qualify for the 2019 Crockett Cup. From January 24 to 26, 2019, Ring of Honor held a 12-team Tag Wars tournament as part of their Road To G1 Supercard tour of Texas. Villain Enterprises (Brody King and PCO) won the three-day tournament by defeating The Kingdom (Vinny Marseglia and T. K. O'Ryan) in the first round, The Bouncers (Brian Milonas and Beer City Bruiser) and the team of Kenny King and MVP in the second round, and Lifeblood (Juice Robinson and David Finlay) in the finals to earn a spot in the Crockett Cup as well as a match for the ROH World Tag Team Championship.

On February 8, 2019 it was announced that ROH partner promotions Consejo Mundial de Lucha Libre (CMLL) out of Mexico, and New Japan Pro-Wrestling (NJPW) from Japan would also be sending teams for the 2019 Crockett Cup.

== Results ==
No.	Results	Stipulations	Times
1	Royce Isaacs and Thomas Latimer won by last eliminating The Boys (Boy 1 and Boy 2) (Note: Other competitors in the match: Cam Carter and LaBron Kozone, Jay Bradley and Jocephus, Team TAG (Billy Buck and Kevin Blue), The Dawgs (Rhett Titus and Will Ferrara), and The Dawsons (Dave Dawson and Zane Dawson))	Wild Card tag team battle royal Crockett Cup qualifier	6:40
2	Bandido and Flip Gordon defeated Guerrero Maya Jr. and Stuka Jr.	Crockett Cup first round tag team match	12:30
3	Royce Isaacs and Thomas Latimer defeated The War Kings (Crimson and Jax Dane)	Crockett Cup first round tag team match	7:50
4	The Briscoe Brothers (Jay Briscoe and Mark Briscoe) defeated The Rock 'n' Roll Express (Ricky Morton and Robert Gibson)	Crockett Cup first round tag team match	6:55
5	Villain Enterprises (Brody King and PCO) defeated Satoshi Kojima and Yuji Nagata	Crockett Cup first round tag team match	11:50
6	Allysin Kay defeated Santana Garrett	Singles match for the vacant NWA Women's Championship	8:55
7	Royce Isaacs and Thomas Latimer defeated Bandido and Flip Gordon	Crockett Cup semifinal tag team match	7:15
8	Villain Enterprises (Brody King and PCO) defeated The Briscoe Brothers (Jay Briscoe and Mark Briscoe) by disqualification	Crockett Cup semifinal tag team match	9:50
9	Colt Cabana defeated Willie Mack (c)	Singles match for the NWA National Championship	8:45
10	Villain Enterprises (Brody King and PCO) defeated The Wild Cards (Royce Isaacs and Thomas Latimer) (with Madusa)	Crockett Cup final tag team match for the vacant NWA World Tag Team Championship	6:40
11	Nick Aldis (c) (with Kamille) defeated Marty Scurll by submission	Singles match for the NWA World Heavyweight Championship	23:45
(c) / – the champion(s) heading into the match

=== Crockett Cup brackets ===
Quarterfinals
The Briscoe Brothers (Jay Briscoe and Mark Briscoe)	W
The Rock 'n' Roll Express (Ricky Morton and Robert Gibson)	6:55
Satoshi Kojima and Yuji Nagata	11:50
Villain Enterprises (Brody King and PCO)	W
Flip Gordon and Bandido	W
Guerrero Maya Jr. and Stuka Jr.	12:30
The War Kings (Crimson and Jax Dane)	7:50
Royce Isaacs and Thomas Latimer	W

Semifinals
Briscoe Brothers	9:50
Villain Enterprises	W
Gordon and Bandido	7:15
Isaacs and Latimer	W

Finals
Villain Enterprises	W
Isaacs and Latimer	6:40
