= Crockett Cup =

American professional wrestling event

Jim Crockett Sr. Memorial Cup Tag Team Tournament
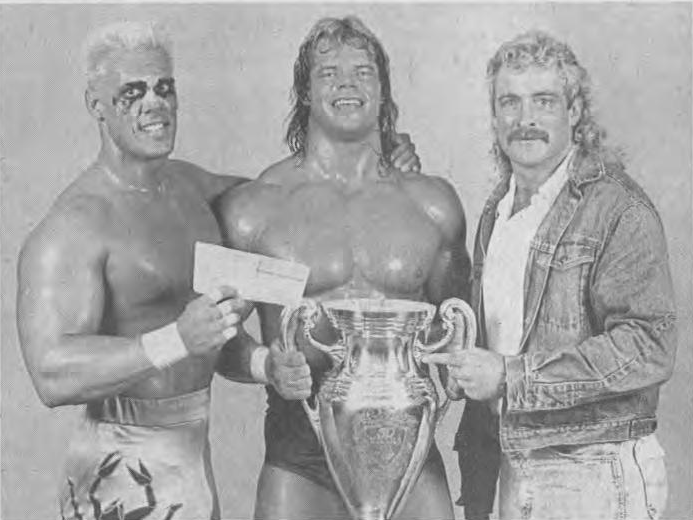
- 1988 winners Sting and Lex Luger (along with Magnum T. A.) pose with the tournament trophy.
- Created by: Jim Crockett Jr.
- Promotions: Jim Crockett Promotions (1986–1988); National Wrestling Alliance (1986–1988, 2019–present); Ring of Honor (2019)
- Other names: Crockett Cup
- First event: Crockett Cup (1986)
- Signature matches: Tag team tournament

The Jim Crockett Sr. Memorial Cup Tag Team Tournament (also known simply as the Crockett Cup) is a professional wrestling event produced annually by the professional wrestling promotion, National Wrestling Alliance (NWA). The event features a tag team professional wrestling tournament with the Crockett Cup awarded to the winning tag team.

== Event history ==
The Jim Crockett Sr. Memorial Cup Tag Team Tournament was created by Jim Crockett Jr. of Jim Crockett Promotions (JCP) in honor of Crockett's father, JCP founder Jim Crockett Sr. The tournament format was single-elimination with a promoted prize of $1 million (U.S.) awarded to the winning team. JCP held the event every April in 1986, 1987, and 1988 before selling the company to Ted Turner (via TBS) in November 1988.

In July 2017, the Crockett Foundation, with Classic Pro Wrestling, held a spin-off version called the Crockett Foundation Cup Tag Team Tournament in New Kent, Virginia. Bobby Fulton, The Barbarian, and The Rock 'n' Roll Express were previous tournament wrestlers that took part in the event. The Geordie Bulldogs (Mark Denny and Sean Denny) were the tournament champions.

On October 1, 2017, William Patrick Corgan's purchase of the NWA (via his company Lightning One, Inc.) was finalized. In addition to ending its operation as a governing body, the NWA vacated all titles, except for the NWA Worlds Heavyweight Championship and the NWA World Women's Championship, and all licenses with previously-affiliated promotions expired. From that point on, NWA gradually became a singular wrestling promotion.

In October 2018, during the NWA 70th Anniversary Show, it was announced that the Jim Crockett Sr. Memorial Cup Tag Team Tournament, now simply called the Crockett Cup, would be returning in April 2019. Thirty-one years after the previous event, the fourth Crockett Cup event was held on April 27, 2019.

In June 2019, the inaugural event from 1986 was uploaded to the WWE Network.

In January 2020, during NWA's Hard Times pay-per-view, it was announced the Crockett Cup would be returning again in April 2020, thus confirming the Crockett Cup as an annual event held by the NWA. On February 18 the NWA announced the date of April 19 for when the Cup would be held and they announced the venue would be the Gateway Center Arena in College Park, Georgia. However, the 2020 event was canceled due to the global pandemic. It would return in 2022 as a two-night event on March 19 and 20.

== Tournament winners ==
- 1986: The Road Warriors (Animal and Hawk)
- 1987: The Super Powers (Nikita Koloff and Dusty Rhodes)
- 1988: Sting and Lex Luger
- 2019: Villain Enterprises (Brody King and PCO)
- 2022: The Briscoe Brothers (Jay Briscoe and Mark Briscoe)
- 2023: Knox and Murdoch
- 2024: The Southern 6 (Kerry Morton and Alex Taylor)
- 2025: The Immortals (Kratos and Odinson)
- 2026: Titans of Calamity (Ren Ayabe and Talos)

== Events ==
#	Event	Date	City	Venue	Main event	Ref.
1	Crockett Cup (1986)	April 19, 1986	New Orleans, Louisiana	Louisiana Superdome	Crockett Cup Tournament Final: The Road Warriors (Animal and Hawk) vs. Magnum T. A. and Ronnie Garvin	
2	Crockett Cup (1987)	April 10, 1987	Baltimore, Maryland	Baltimore Arena	Big Bubba vs. Ole Anderson in a Last man standing steel cage match	
2	Crockett Cup (1987)	April 11, 1987	Baltimore, Maryland	Baltimore Arena	Crockett Cup Tournament Final: The Super Powers (Dusty Rhodes and Nikita Koloff) vs. Lex Luger and Tully Blanchard	
3	Crockett Cup (1988)	April 22, 1988	Greenville, South Carolina	Greenville Memorial Auditorium	Crockett Cup Tournament Second Round: The Midnight Express (Bobby Eaton and Stan Lane) (with Jim Cornette) vs. The Sheepherders (Butch Miller and Luke Williams) (with Rip Morgan)	
3	Crockett Cup (1988)	April 23, 1988	Greensboro, North Carolina	Greensboro Coliseum	Crockett Cup Tournament Final: Lex Luger and Sting vs. Arn Anderson and Tully Blanchard	
4	Crockett Cup (2019)	April 27, 2019	Concord, North Carolina	Cabarrus Arena	Crockett Cup Tournament Final: Villain Enterprises (Brody King and PCO) vs. The Wild Cards (Royce Isaacs and Thom Latimer) (with Madusa)	
4	Crockett Cup (2019)	April 27, 2019	Concord, North Carolina	Cabarrus Arena	Nick Aldis (c) vs. Marty Scurll for the NWA Worlds Heavyweight Championship	
5	Crockett Cup (2022)	March 19, 2022	Nashville, Tennessee	Tennessee State Fairground Sports Arena	Crockett Cup Tournament Quarterfinal: The Commonwealth Connection (Doug Williams and Harry Smith) vs. Gold Rushhh (Jordan Clearwater and Marshe Rockett)	
5	Crockett Cup (2022)	March 20, 2022	Nashville, Tennessee	Tennessee State Fairground Sports Arena	Matt Cardona (c) vs. Nick Aldis for the NWA Worlds Heavyweight Championship, with Jeff Jarrett as the special guest referee	
6	Crockett Cup (2023)	June 3, 2023	Winston-Salem, North Carolina	Winston-Salem Fairgrounds Annex	Crockett Cup Tournament Second Round: La Rebelión (Bestia 666 and Mecha Wolf) vs. Flippin' Psychos (Flip Gordon and Fodder) (with Angelina Love)	
6	Crockett Cup (2023)	June 4, 2023	Winston-Salem, North Carolina	Winston-Salem Fairgrounds Annex	Crockett Cup Tournament Final: Knox and Murdoch vs. Blunt Force Trauma (Carnage and Damage) (with Aron Stevens)	
7	Crockett Cup (2024)	May 18, 2024	Forney, Texas	The OC Theater	Crockett Cup Tournament Final: The Southern 6 (Kerry Morton and Alex Taylor) vs. The Immortals (Kratos and Odinson)	
8	Crockett Cup (2025)	May 17, 2025	Philadelphia, Pennsylvania	2300 Arena	Crockett Cup Tournament Final: The Immortals (Kratos and Odinson) vs. The Colóns (Eddie Colón and Orlando Colón)	
9	Crockett Cup (2026)	April 4, 2026	Forney, Texas	The OC Theater	Crockett Cup Tournament Final: Titans of Calamity (Ren Ayabe and Talos) vs. The Country Gentlemen (AJ Cazana and KC Cazana)	
(c) – refers to the champion(s) heading into the match
