= NWA By Any Means Necessary =

2021 National Wrestling Alliance event

- Official poster for the event with Kamille, Trevor Murdoch holding the NWA Worlds Heavyweight Championship, and Nick Aldis
- Promotions: National Wrestling Alliance; Tried-N-True Wrestling
- Date: October 24, 2021 (aired November 2 and 9, 2021)
- City: Oak Grove, Kentucky
- Venue: Valor Hall

Pop-Up Event chronology
← Previous; New Years Clash	Next → Duuuval Brawl 4

NWA By Any Means Necessary, part of the NWA Pop-Up Event series, was a professional wrestling supercard produced by the National Wrestling Alliance (NWA) in conjunction with Tried-N-True Pro Wrestling. The event took place on October 24, 2021, at the Valor Hall in Oak Grove, Kentucky. Matches from the event were taped for episodes of NWA Powerrr, which aired on November 2 and 9 on FITE TV.

== Production ==
=== Storylines ===
The event featured professional wrestling matches that involved different wrestlers from pre-existing scripted feuds and storylines. Wrestlers portrayed heroes, villains, or less distinguishable characters in scripted events that built tension and culminated in a wrestling match or series of matches. Storylines were produced during the sixth season of the NWA's weekly web series, Powerrr.

At NWA 73, Jax Dane attacked his War Kings tag team partner Crimson before the latter's hardcore triple threat match with Thom Latimer and Tim Storm. Two weeks later on Powerrr, the former partners participated in a slap fight hosted by NWA Worlds Heavyweight Champion Trevor Murdoch. However, Dane would soon punch instead of slap Crimson in the face, causing a scuffle between the two. On September 17, in the announcement of By Any Means Necessary, it was announced that Crimson and Dane would wrestle in a Steel Cage match to main event the show.

== Results ==
No.	Results	Stipulations	Times
1	Da Pope defeated Colby Corino	Singles match	8:17
2	The Fixers (Jay Bradley and Wrecking Ball Legursky) defeated The Ill Begotten (Captain Yuma and Rush Freeman)	Tag team match	4:15
3	The OGK (Matt Taven and Mike Bennett) defeated The Fixers (Jay Bradley and Wrecking Ball Legursky)	Tag team match	8:21
4	Judais (with Father James Mitchell) defeated Sal Rinauro	Singles match for Judais’s NWA National Championship title shot Since Rinauro lost, he cannot challenge for the title again for 18 months	6:01
5	The Hex (Allysin Kay and Marti Belle) (c) defeated Thunder Kitty and Tootie Lynn	Tag team match for the NWA World Women's Tag Team Championship	5:18
6	Cyon defeated Mims	Singles match	14:36
7	Tim Storm defeated Jaden Roller	No Disqualification match	7:00
8	Kamille (c) defeated Kenzie Paige (2-0)	Two-out-of-three falls match for the NWA World Women's Championship	10:24
9	Trevor Murdoch and Nick Aldis defeated Strictly Business (Thom Latimer and Chris Adonis) (with Kamille)	Tag team match	15:18
10	Jax Dane defeated Crimson	Steel Cage match	9:12
(c) / – the champion(s) heading into the match
