= The Super Powers =

Professional wrestling tag team

Tag team
- Members: Dusty Rhodes; Nikita Koloff
- Billed heights: Dusty: 6 ft 1 in (1.85 m); Nikita: 6 ft 2 in (1.88 m)
- Combined billed weight: 577 lb (262 kg; 41.2 st)
- Debut: 1986
- Disbanded: 1988

The Super Powers were a tag team in the NWA's Jim Crockett Promotions in the 1980s. The name was because an American and a "Russian" made up the team while the Cold War was still going strong.

== History ==
Dusty Rhodes had been teaming with Magnum T. A. in the NWA for most of 1986. They were battling The Four Horsemen and were scheduled for a cage match against Tully Blanchard and Ole Anderson on October 24, 1986. Magnum had a car wreck that ended his career before the match and Jim Crockett, Jr. needed a replacement. On the night of the match, J. J. Dillon (Blanchard was injured) and Ole Anderson were waiting in the cage to see who Dusty would bring out. It turned out to be "The Russian Nightmare" Nikita Koloff, a top heel in the promotion, with whom Magnum had previously been feuding. Koloff was actually American but was billed as being from Russia. Koloff and Rhodes defeated Dillon and Anderson in minutes and The Super Powers were born. Rhodes and Koloff participated in the 1987 Jim Crockett, Sr. Memorial Cup Tag Team Tournament. They received a bye into the second round before defeating the teams of Bill Dundee and The Barbarian, Rick Rude and Manny Fernandez, and The Midnight Express (Bobby Eaton and Stan Lane) to advance to the finals. In the final round, they defeated Lex Luger and Tully Blanchard, two members of the Four Horsemen, to win the tournament and its kayfabe prize of one million dollars. They participated in several WarGames matches, teaming with The Road Warriors against The Four Horsemen. The Super Powers teamed with several partners for the four-on-four matches, which took place in 1987 and 1988, and won each time. Dusty and Nikita feuded with the Horsemen until early 1988, when they stopped teaming. They also feuded with Nikita's "uncle" Ivan Koloff, who was mad that Nikita turned on him, along with Ivan's partners Vladimir Petrov and Dick Murdoch.

In 2003, they had a reformation in Total Nonstop Action Wrestling when Nikita was unmasked as "Mr. Wrestling IV" after attacking Rhodes several times. He then rejoined Dusty in fighting Vince Russo's Sports Entertainment Xtreme (S.E.X.) stable during a ladder match between Rhodes and S.E.X. member Brian Lawler. Koloff interfered by climbing the ladder to retrieve the belt that was suspended above the ring. He then presented it to Rhodes, and the former partners hugged in the ring.

== Championships and accomplishments ==
- National Wrestling Alliance

- Jim Crockett, Sr. Memorial Cup Tag Team Tournament (1987)
- NWA World Television Championship (2 time)-Dusty Rhodes (1), Nikita Koloff (1)
- NWA United States Heavyweight Championship (2 Times)-Nikita Koloff (1), Dusty Rhodes (1)
- UWF Television Championship (1 Time)-Nikita Koloff

- Pro Wrestling Illustrated

- PWI Feud of the Year (1987) - with The Road Warriors vs. the Four Horsemen.
