= Nikita Koloff =

American professional wrestler (born 1959)

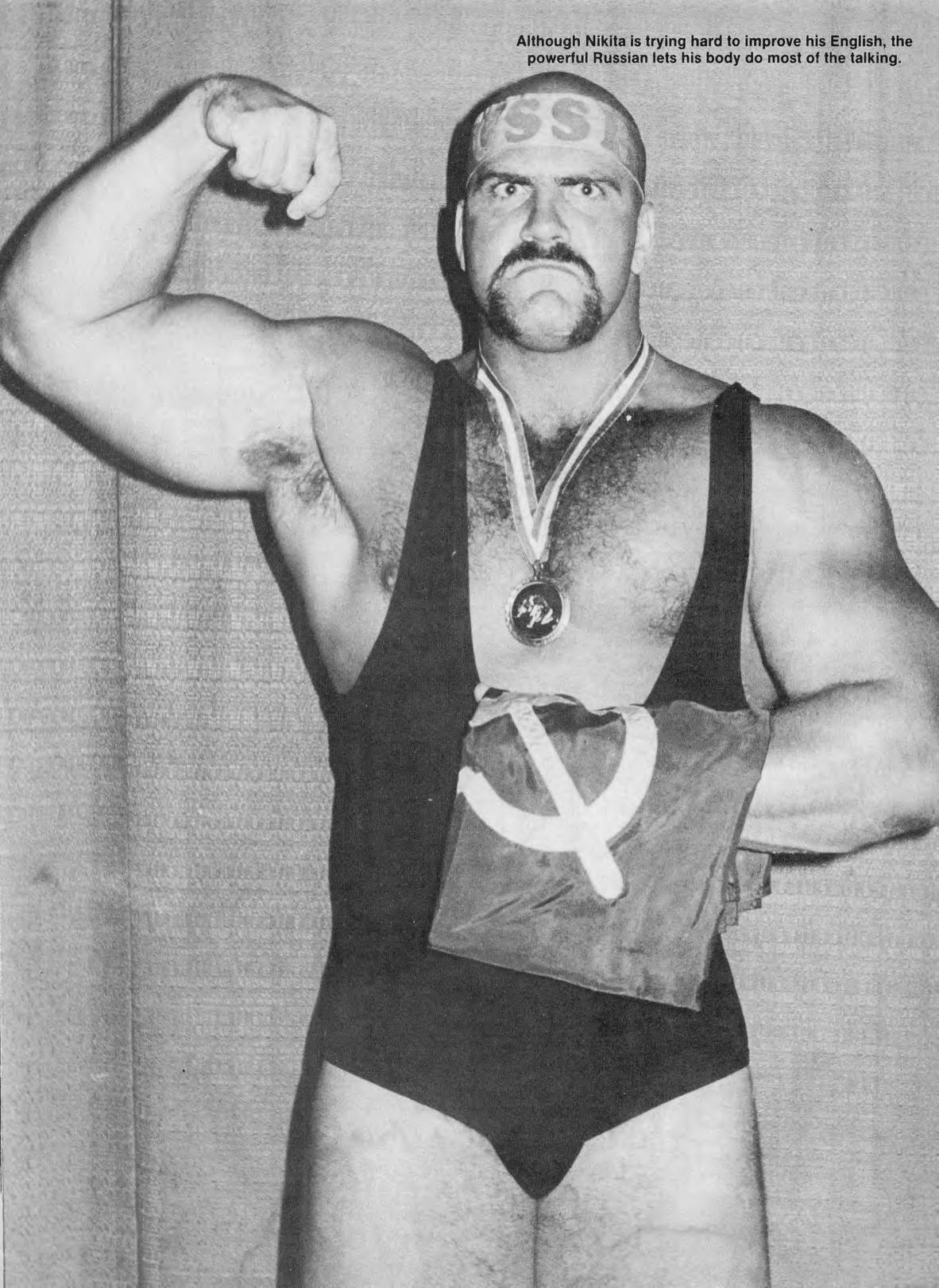
- Koloff c. 1985

Personal information
- Born: Nelson Scott Simpson; March 9, 1959 (age 67) Minneapolis, Minnesota, U.S.
- Education: Minnesota State University Moorhead

Professional wrestling career
- Ring name(s): Mr. Wrestling IV; Nikita Koloff
- Billed height: 6 ft 2 in (188 cm)
- Billed weight: 275 lb (125 kg)
- Billed from: Russia; Lithuania
- Trained by: Eddie Sharkey
- Debut: June 24, 1984
- Retired: November 8, 1992

Nikita Koloff (born Nelson Scott Simpson, March 9, 1959) is an American retired professional wrestler. He is best known for his appearances with Jim Crockett Promotions and its successor, World Championship Wrestling between 1984 and 1992, where he was billed from Russia (and, following the dissolution of the Soviet Union, Lithuania). During his career, Koloff held championships including the NWA World Six-Man Tag Team Championship, NWA World Tag Team Championship, NWA United States Championship, NWA World Television Championship, and UWF World Television Championship. He was inducted into the George Tragos/Lou Thesz Professional Wrestling Hall of Fame in 2006 and the National Wrestling Alliance Hall of Fame of 2008.

== Early life ==
Koloff was born on March 9, 1959, in Minneapolis, Minnesota, one of four children born to Paige and Olive Simpson. When he was two years old, his father left the family, leaving his mother as a single parent. When Koloff was 10, his family relocated to the suburb of Robbinsdale. While in junior high school, Koloff began weightlifting. He attended Robbinsdale High School where he played for the Robbinsdale Robins football team as a defensive lineman and on offense was an all-conference wide receiver. His fellow students included other future professional wrestlers Barry Darsow, Brady Boone, Curt Hennig, John Nord, Rick Rude, and Tom Zenk.

Koloff graduated from high school in 1977. He enrolled in Golden Valley Lutheran College where he played college football alongside fellow future wrestler Joe "Animal" Laurinaitis. He suffered an injury playing football but rehabbed to play for Minnesota State University Moorhead where he suffered another injury.

== Professional wrestling career ==
=== Jim Crockett Promotions (1984–1989) ===
==== "The Russian Nightmare" (1984–1986) ====
In 1984, Simpson was going to try out for the United States Football League when Road Warrior Animal, a professional wrestler from the Minnesota area, called him to ask him to become a professional wrestler. Simpson decided to go with wrestling and was told to shave his head bald and to show up. Jim Crockett Jr., the promoter of the NWA's Jim Crockett Promotions, renamed him "Nikita Koloff", the Russian Nightmare, and teamed him with "uncle" Ivan Koloff and Don Kernodle, a turncoat American. Koloff was briefly trained by Eddie Sharkey. He debuted on June 5, 1984, and won his first match in 13 seconds, with the only edict from Crockett being that should Koloff trip on the ropes, he would be fired on the spot.

Koloff wrestled briefly in Puerto Rico for the World Wrestling Council (WWC) and engaged in some bouts with Hercules Ayala. He returned with Ivan Koloff in 1986 and faced Invader I and Invader III at a big house show at Juan Ramon Loubriel Stadium in Bayamon.

While he learned more about the business on the road with Ivan and Kernodle, Koloff was booked in very short matches until his skills developed. During television promos, Nikita stood behind Ivan and Kernodle with his arms folded while they took interviews. As his wrestling ability and speaking skills grew, the length of his matches and interviews grew as well. His improvement negated the need for Kernodle to continue teaming with Ivan and, shortly thereafter, the Russians turned on the American turncoat. Koloff went to great lengths to keep the "Evil Russian" gimmick as realistic as possible. He learned Russian and refused to come out of character, even when away from the ring.

With Kernodle out of the picture, Ivan Koloff introduced a new comrade named Krusher Khruschev (fellow Robbinsdale High School classmate Barry Darsow). In December 1984, Jim Crockett rewarded the Russians with the NWA World Six-Man Tag Team Championship. Three months later, on March 18, 1985, Koloff and Ivan defeated Dusty Rhodes and Manny Fernandez to win the NWA World Tag Team Championship. Ivan invoked the Freebird Rule which dictated that any two of the three could defend the titles. Ivan and Krusher lost the titles to the Rock 'n' Roll Express on July 9.

Prior to committing themselves with Jim Crocket Promotions, the Koloffs feuded with then AWA World Tag Team Champions the Road Warriors in both the AWA and the NWA in a brutal series during 1985. One of their encounters was voted Match of the Year runner-up by the readers of Pro Wrestling Illustrated. The feud was often fought in steel cage Russia chain matches, with lights-out stipulations. The Russian 'chain match', using thicker chains than normal chain matches, was considered a Nikita Koloff specialty.

Continuing to improve, Koloff became a big enough heel to get a match against NWA World Champion Ric Flair at The Great American Bash in July 1985. Koloff lost to Flair and was even attacked by a fan during the match, but he established himself as a superstar in the wrestling business. According to Koloff, it was his favourite match of his career.

The Koloffs went on to regain the NWA World Tag Team title from the Rock 'n' Roll Express three months later, on October 13, but lost it to the same opponents on November 28 at Starrcade '85: The Gathering in a steel cage match.

In 1985 and 1986, Koloff wrestled several matches for Capitol Sports Promotions in Puerto Rico as part of a talent exchange, facing Hercules Ayala on several occasions. During one bout, Koloff sustained a cut to the arm when an audience member threw a spark plug at him.

In spring of 1986, Koloff started one of the biggest, most anticipated feuds in the history of Jim Crockett Promotions when he attacked NWA United States Heavyweight Champion Magnum T. A. Following an incident where Magnum hit on-screen NWA President Bob Geigel for demanding an apology after T.A. started a brawl with Nikita during a contract signing (which started when the Koloffs berated Magnum's mother, who was present), T.A. was stripped of his title. The two were then booked in a best-of-seven series, which took place during Great American Bash tour. The winner of the series would be declared champion. Koloff and T.A. wrestled all summer, ending up tied after six matches with one no contest. The final match took place on August 17 and featured run-ins by Kruschev and Ivan and several false-finishes. Nikita defeated T.A. to win the title.

The following month, Koloff defeated Wahoo McDaniel to unify his US Title with Wahoo's NWA National Heavyweight Championship on September 28. He was readying to embark on a feud with Ron Garvin that would last through the upcoming Starrcade '86: The Skywalkers. The idea of head booker Dusty Rhodes was for Koloff to reignite his feud with Magnum T. A. the following year. The plan called for T.A. to defeat Ric Flair for the NWA World Heavyweight Championship at Starrcade '86; after a short program of rematches with Flair, T. A. would begin a long program with Koloff that ran through The Great American Bash Tour of 1987. As of the beginning of October, Rhodes had not decided whether to give Koloff the title at some point during the feud.

==== Feud with The Four Horsemen (1986–1987) ====
In October 1986, Magnum T. A. was involved in a career-ending car accident. Dusty Rhodes saw an alternate opportunity. The Soviet Premier Mikhail Gorbachev had been growing in popularity throughout the country with his political reform of Glasnost and Perestroika. The era of evil Russian heels was coming to an end. Rhodes decided to strike while the iron was hot, booking Koloff to become a face and his greatest ally against The Four Horsemen. The historic moment took place on October 24 in Charlotte, North Carolina. Rhodes needed a partner to take on Ole Anderson and J. J. Dillon in a cage match. The fans in Charlotte erupted when Koloff entered the cage to help Rhodes. Koloff stated that even though he and Magnum T. A. had a bitter rivalry, T.A. had earned his respect, and that Nikita would work to earn the respect of the American people. This evening established Koloff as one of the top faces in the NWA.

Immediately after his face turn, Koloff resumed his quest for Ric Flair's NWA World Title and came very close to winning it on several occasions. Flair's Four Horsemen comrades bailed him out almost every time. The two fought to a double disqualification at Starrcade '86 on November 26. After Starrcade, Koloff was firmly established as one of the NWA's most popular stars. In 1987, Krusher, who left the NWA for the World Wrestling Federation, asked Koloff to join him. However, Koloff declined the offer because he felt loyalty to the promotion and he didn't want to start a new gimmick.

Throughout the early months of 1987, Koloff continued to defend the United States title against members of the Four Horsemen and Paul Jones' Army, which now included "Uncle" Ivan. In March, as part of his ongoing feud with Ivan and Dick Murdoch, Koloff's neck was "injured" by a Murdoch brainbuster on the concrete floor (of course this was a work). On April 11, Koloff and Dusty Rhodes won the second-annual Jim Crockett, Sr. Memorial Cup Tag Team Tournament, defeating the Four Horsemen team of Tully Blanchard and Lex Luger in the finals.

As the 1987 Great American Bash tour got under way, the feud between Koloff, Rhodes, The Road Warriors, and Paul Ellering versus The Four Horsemen and J. J. Dillon was booked as the centerpiece. The tour began and ended with two revolutionary matches created by Rhodes, known as WarGames: The Match Beyond. The team of The Super Powers and The Legion of Doom emerged victorious in both contests.

Also during The War Games, Flair and Blanchard reaggravated Koloff's neck injury by delivering two spike piledrivers. The worked injury set up the pretext for dropping the US Title to Lex Luger. On July 11, 1987, Koloff faced Luger in a steel cage match and was defeated after being hit with a chair. This ended Koloff's reign of nearly 11 months, which still stands today as the fifth longest U.S. title reign in the more than 33-year history of the title. Dusty Rhodes booked Koloff to rebound quickly, winning the NWA World Television Championship from Tully Blanchard on August 27.

==== Various feuds (1987–1989) ====
In the fall of 1987, Jim Crockett Promotions acquired Bill Watts' Universal Wrestling Federation (UWF). Dusty Rhodes decided which members of the UWF roster to retain and how best to use the infusion of new talent that he now had access to on an exclusive basis, beginning with a cross-promotional program between NWA Television Champion Koloff and UWF Television Champion, Terry Taylor. The feud began when Taylor, alongside his fellow members of Hot Stuff International, Inc. - Eddie Gilbert and Rick Steiner- attacked Koloff and stole his championship belt. Koloff and Taylor were booked to face each other in a unification bout at Starrcade '87: Chi-Town Heat, but Koloff vowed to get his TV belt back before the match. During a TBS World Championship Wrestling (WCW) broadcast leading up to what would be Jim Crockett's first foray into pay-per-view, Taylor and Gilbert jumped Koloff again, beating him unconscious, and draping his version of the TV title across his limp body. On November 26, Koloff and Taylor battled in what would be the only NWA/UWF unification bout at the UIC Pavilion in Chicago. In front of his first pay-per-view audience, Nikita became the undisputed Television Champion by defeating Taylor on November 26. He still has the UWF belt as a trophy from that night.

Koloff lost the NWA TV Title to Mike Rotunda of The Varsity Club on January 30, 1988. During this period, Koloff had altered his appearance somewhat, dropping some muscle mass (Koloff used anabolic steroids during the early part of his career but stopped when he saw where they were leading - he lost his muscle mass due to taking time off to take care of his wife, Mandy) and growing his hair out into a crewcut. He was given the singles main event when he wrestled NWA World Champion Ric Flair at the final Jim Crockett Sr. Memorial Cup Tag Team Tournament. Koloff defeated Flair by disqualification so the title was retained by Flair. He then lost to Barry Windham in the finals of the tournament for the vacant NWA United States Championship, before beginning a feud with Al Perez and teaming with Sting to feud with the Four Horsemen. During the year, he legally changed his name to 'Nikita S. Koloff'.

In the fall of 1988, Koloff was quickly losing interest in professional wrestling for personal reasons. His wife Mandy was suffering from Hodgkin's disease and died in the summer of 1989. After Ivan himself turned face when manager Paul Jones went against him, Koloff helped Ivan briefly against Jones' henchmen, the masked Russian Assassins, and then he took a sabbatical on November 27. A booked showdown at Starrcade '88: True Gritt in December was to pit Ivan and Nikita against the Russian Assassins. Koloff's departure resulted in the Junkyard Dog substituting for him as Ivan's partner. The Russian Assassins were victorious.

Eventually, Koloff eased back into the business part-time. He returned to WCW/NWA as a special guest referee at WrestleWar '89 in match for the NWA World Tag Team Championship between The Road Warriors and Mike Rotunda and "Dr. Death" Steve Williams. Rotunda & Williams were disqualified for attacking Koloff, and later stripped of the titles.

Despite some people's beliefs, Nikita was never offered any sort of contract with WWF. He met Vince McMahon only twice: first time while working out in a gym in Las Vegas, Nevada (they shook hands and said "hello") and again at Road Warrior Hawk's funeral.

=== AWA and Various promotions (1989–1990) ===
In late 1989, Koloff began wrestling with Verne Gagne's AWA (as a part of a talent share with the NWA) in his native Minnesota. The promotion was in its twilight and given Nikita's stature, Gagne positioned Nikita to challenge then AWA World Heavyweight Champion Larry Zbyszko almost immediately. Koloff continued wrestling in the NWA and the AWA for the remainder of the year and the first half of 1990, headlining numerous television broadcasts and Twin Wars '90, the last major event with the AWA under Gagne. Koloff also wrestled briefly in Herb Abrams' Universal Wrestling Federation, in no way affiliated with the original UWF of Bill Watts, where he reignited a feud with 'Uncle' Ivan.

=== World Championship Wrestling (1991–1992) ===
Koloff returned to WCW on February 24, 1991, at WrestleWar. He turned heel by attacking Lex Luger, claiming he had "stolen" the NWA United States Heavyweight Championship from him in 1987 and that he wanted it back. At SuperBrawl I on May 19, 1991, Koloff accidentally hit Sting with a chain while interfering in a tag team match between Sting and Lex Luger and The Steiner Brothers. Koloff and Sting went on to face one another in a Russian Chain match at The Great American Bash on July 14 which was won by Koloff. The feud came to an abortive end in August 1991 when Koloff left WCW to focus on running his gym, "Nikita's Fortress of Fitness," in Concord, North Carolina.

Koloff returned to WCW in February 1992, saving Sting from an attack by The Dangerous Alliance. He explained on WCW's syndicated shows that he had seen the error of attacking Sting and that his actual grudge had been with Luger who in any case had shown his true colors by himself turning heel at the 1991 Bash, in the process of winning the WCW World Heavyweight Championship. At WrestleWar on May 17, 1992, Koloff teamed with Sting, Ricky Steamboat, Barry Windham, and Dustin Rhodes to face The Dangerous Alliance in a WarGames match. Koloff went on to feud with Rick Rude over Rude's WCW United States Heavyweight Championship. In late-1992, he began feuding with Big Van Vader, with the two men facing one other at Halloween Havoc on October 25. During the bout, Koloff sustained a herniated disc in his neck, leading him to retire from professional wrestling. Koloff worked some house shows against Rick Rude and Vader until his last match losing to Vader on November 8.

== Retirement (1992–present) ==
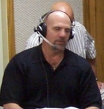
Koloff in 2006

Koloff became a born-again Christian in 1993. He now runs a ministry. He also runs his own small wrestling promotion, the Universal Wrestling Alliance UWA as an outreach of his ministry.

He made a few appearances for NWA:TNA in 2003 as a masked man called "Mr. Wrestling IV" who attacked Dusty Rhodes. He finally unmasked but ended up helping Rhodes against the Sports Entertainment Xtreme stable.

On July 15, 2006, Koloff received the Frank Gotch Award from the George Tragos/Lou Thesz Professional Wrestling Hall of Fame at the International Wrestling Institute and Museum in Waterloo, Iowa, for contributing to the positive public image of wrestling.

On March 3, 2024, Koloff was shown in the crowd during Sting's retirement match at AEW's Revolution alongside Magnum T.A. and Scotty Riggs.

== Professional wrestling persona ==
Koloff was originally billed as being a Russian. He was billed as the nephew of fellow faux-Russian Ivan Koloff, from whom he took his ring name. He was nicknamed "The Russian Nightmare", a play on Dusty Rhodes' nickname, "The American Dream". He was also known as "The Russian Road Warrior" due to his power and ferocity, which was compared to The Road Warriors. Following the dissolution of the Soviet Union, Koloff was billed from Lithuania. To enhance the verisimilitude of his character, Koloff learned to speak Russian.

Koloff had an "evil" appearance with a black singlet, shaved head, and goatee. His character has been described as "wrestling's equivalent of the Drago character in Rocky IV...big, strong, scary and Russian. His finishing move was the "Russian Sickle", a clothesline.

== Other media ==
Koloff has written three books. He has acted in a small number of films and television episodes, as well as appearing on an episode of America's Funniest People in which his daughter won the $10,000 grand prize. His character appeared in the 2004 videogame Showdown: Legends of Wrestling as well as the 2021 game Retromania Wrestling.

=== Bibliography ===
- Breaking the Chains (2002)
- Wrestling with Success: Developing a Championship Mentality (2004) - with Jeffrey Gitomer
- Nikita: A Tale of the Ring and Redemption (2011) - with Scott Teal

=== Filmography ===
Year	Film	Role	Notes
2007	Stuck in the Past	Bartender	
2009	C Me Dance	Biker	
2013	Preacher's Daughters	Himself	Reality series
2018	Pastor Greg's Reboot - Hope for Christmas	Jake	Short film

== Personal life ==
Nikita married his first wife, Mandy Smithson, on September 20, 1988. She died from Hodgkin's disease on June 14, 1989. At her funeral he met Mandy's longtime friend and his future wife, Victoria. They married on August 17, 1990. The couple had two daughters together, Kendra, who was born in June 1992, and Kolby, who was born in May 1996, while Victoria had two daughters (Teryn and Tawni) from her previous relationship. Nikita and Victoria were divorced on April 23, 2007.

Koloff legally changed his name to Nikita Koloff in 1984.

Nikita is a member of a religious group called Fellowship of the Sword and serves as an East Coast representative.

== Championships and accomplishments ==
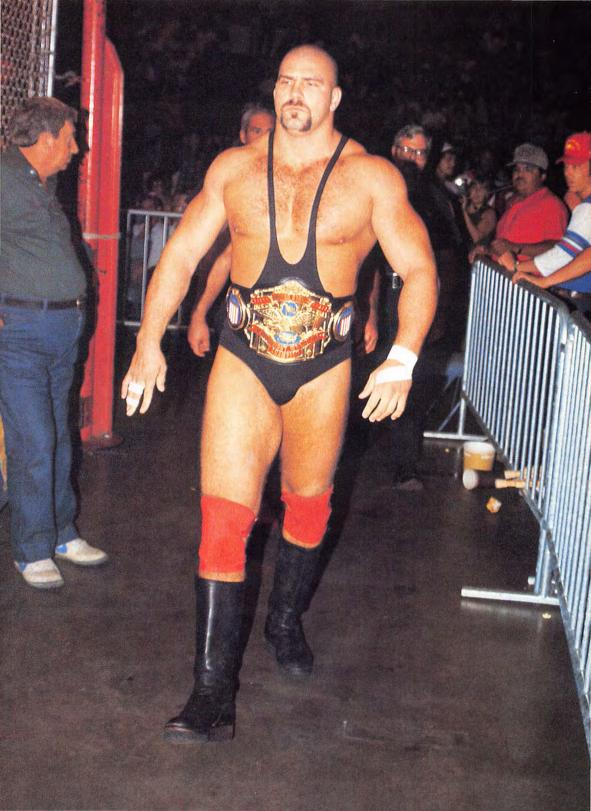
Koloff as the NWA United States Heavyweight Champion in 1987.

- George Tragos/Lou Thesz Professional Wrestling Hall of Fame
  - Class of 2006
- Jim Crockett Promotions
  - NWA World Television Championship (1 time)
  - NWA National Heavyweight Championship (1 time)^{1}
  - NWA United States Heavyweight Championship (1 time)
  - NWA World Tag Team Championship (Mid-Atlantic version) (2 times) – with Ivan Koloff
  - NWA World Six-Man Tag Team Championship (4 times) – with Ivan Koloff and Don Kernodle (1), Ivan Koloff and Krusher Khruschev (2), and Ivan Koloff and Baron von Raschke (1)
  - UWF World Television Championship (1 time)^{2}
  - Jim Crockett, Sr. Memorial Cup Tag Team Tournament (1987) with Dusty Rhodes
- National Wrestling Alliance
  - NWA Hall of Fame (Class of 2008)
- Pro Wrestling Illustrated
  - PWI Feud of the Year (1987) with Dusty Rhodes and The Road Warriors vs. The Four Horsemen
  - PWI Most Inspirational Wrestler of the Year (1987)

^{1} Koloff defeated Wahoo McDaniel to unify the title with the NWA United States Heavyweight Championship. The title was also won after Georgia Championship Wrestling was purchased by Jim Crockett Promotions.
^{2} Koloff defeated Terry Taylor to unify the title with the NWA World Television Championship. The title was also won after Bill Watts' Universal Wrestling Federation promotion was purchased by Jim Crockett Promotions.
