= Jim Crockett =

American professional wrestling promoter (1908–1973)

Personal information
- Born: James Allen Crockett; June 2, 1908 Bristol, Virginia, U.S.
- Died: April 1, 1973 (aged 64)
- Cause of death: Heart Attack
- Spouse: Elizabeth Eversole (his death)
- Children: Frances Crockett Ringley (born 1940); James Allen Crockett Jr. (1944–2021); David Finley Crockett (born 1946); Charles J. "Jackie" Crockett (born 1948-2024)

Professional wrestling career
- Ring name: Big Jim
- Debut: 1931

James Allen Crockett Sr. (June 2, 1908 – April 1, 1973) was an American professional wrestling promoter and professional sports franchise owner sometimes known as Jim Crockett Sr., or to people within the business simply as "Big Jim".

== Early life ==
Crockett was born on June 2, 1908, in Bristol, Virginia, to Charles Sampson Crockett (1878-1960) and Josie E. (Berry) Crockett. As a youth, he became a fan of pro wrestling, which had thrived during the 1920s with such grapplers as Strangler Lewis and Joe Stecher dominating the scene.

== Career ==
=== Professional wrestling ===
In the early 1930s, a dispute arose over the bookings of new wrestling sensation Jim Londos, so New York City promoter Jack Curley negotiated an alliance between various regional managers that enabled Londos to travel the country as champion while allowing the promoters to share profits evenly across the regions. As a result of this arrangement, new wrestling "territories" emerged across the U.S., and in 1935, a 25-year-old Crockett, who had also served as a concert promoter while also owning a theater and a restaurant, decided to set up a permanent wrestling shop based in Charlotte, North Carolina. The organization, known as Jim Crockett Promotions, scheduled wrestling events in both Carolinas, as well as in Virginia, under the banner of Eastern States Championship Wrestling. Over the next decade, ESCW featured some of the top wrestling stars of the day. Then in 1948, wrestling's top promoters gathered in Waterloo, Iowa, to form the industry's first true governing body, known as the National Wrestling Alliance. As the dominant force representing the Carolina region, Jim Crockett Promotions soon became an important member of the NWA, with Crockett serving as a chief lieutenant under longtime NWA President and leading St. Louis promoter Sam Muchnick. Over the next 25 years, Crockett's Carolina territory reigned among the most successful regions in the NWA, as he regularly sold out the 16,000-seat Greensboro Coliseum featuring such stars as Johnny Weaver, Rip Hawk, Swede Hanson, and Gene & Ole Anderson on his Championship Wrestling program.

=== Ice hockey and baseball ===
The championship trophy of the Southern Hockey League was named the James Crockett Cup. In 1976, the Crockett family purchased the Asheville Orioles and renamed them the Charlotte Orioles. They also saved the historic Calvin Griffith Park from being torn down and restored it to preserve its history. It was renamed Jim Crockett Memorial Park, and then DBA "Crockett Park" in 1977. The stadium was set on fire by a group of juveniles on March 16, 1985, and by 1987, it was closed down.

== Personal life and death ==
He was married to Elizabeth Jackson Eversole Crockett, with whom he had four children: James Allen Crockett Jr., David Finley Crockett, Charles J. "Jackie" Crockett (died March 13, 2024) and Frances Crockett.

By the early 1970s, an ailing Crockett was forced to retire, as his son-in-law John Rigley had begun to take over many of the territory's responsibilities. Crockett died on April 1, 1973, and control of the company was then ceded to his son, 28-year-old Jim Crockett Jr., who took over the promotion and ultimately renamed it "Mid-Atlantic Championship Wrestling." Jim Crockett Promotions would eventually hold a tag team tournament from 1986 through 1988 in honor of him called the Jim Crockett Sr. Memorial Cup Tag Team Tournament. He was inducted into the Professional Wrestling Hall of Fame and Museum in 2015.

== Legacy ==
=== The Crockett Foundation ===
Established in 1931, the Crockett Foundation is a non-profit organization that seeks to financially assist US military veterans who have returned home from service. The organization is named after Jim Crockett Sr. and maintains a strong association to professional wrestling and baseball. Various figures from the pro wrestling industry have endorsed Crockett Foundation.

== Awards and accomplishments ==
- Professional Wrestling Hall of Fame
  - Class of 2015
- Wrestling Observer Newsletter

- Wrestling Observer Newsletter Hall of Fame (Class of 2019)
