= Jim Crockett Jr. =

American wrestling promoter (1944–2021)

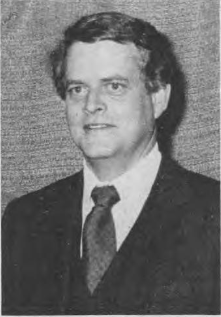
- Crockett, c. 1982

Personal information
- Born: James Allen Crockett Jr. August 10, 1944 Charlotte, North Carolina, U.S.
- Died: March 3, 2021 (aged 76) Charlotte, North Carolina, U.S.
- Cause of death: Kidney Failure

Professional wrestling career
- Ring name: Jim Crockett
- Debut: 1973
- Retired: 1994

James Allen Crockett Jr. (August 10, 1944 – March 3, 2021) was an American professional wrestling promoter. From 1973 to 1989, he was part owner of Jim Crockett Promotions (JCP), a wrestling company affiliated with the National Wrestling Alliance (NWA). From 1976 to 1987, Crockett and his family also owned the Charlotte Orioles, a minor league baseball team based in Charlotte, North Carolina as well as owning the Winston-Salem Polar Twins in the Southern Hockey League from 1974 to 1975.

== Early life ==
Born to Jim Crockett Sr. and Elizabeth (Eversole) Crockett, Jim Jr. graduated from Myers Park High School in Charlotte, North Carolina in 1960. He and his younger siblings (David, Jackie, and Frances) were largely uninvolved in professional wrestling until their father's death in 1973. The elder Crockett had been a promoter of wrestling and other forms of entertainment since 1931, with JCP joining the NWA in 1952.

== Career ==
=== Taking over Jim Crockett Promotions ===
Although Jim Crockett Sr. had decided his son-in-law John Ringley would run JCP, Jim Jr. reluctantly took over ownership of the company after his father's death in 1973 and a dispute with Ringley. Crockett brought in wrestler George Scott as head booker, and he recruited wrestlers from across the country, from veterans such as Wahoo McDaniel to younger wrestlers like Ric Flair.

=== NWA president ===
==== First term ====
In 1980, Crockett was elected to his first term as NWA President, which ended in 1982. He had a working relationship with Maple Leaf Wrestling, based out of Toronto and owned by Frank Tunney, until Tunney's death in 1983. Tunney's nephew Jack Tunney switched Maple Leaf Wrestling's working agreement to Vince McMahon's World Wrestling Federation (WWF). Crockett then formed a short-lived relationship with Verne Gagne and his American Wrestling Association (AWA) to form Pro Wrestling USA.

==== Second term ====
Crockett was elected to a second term as NWA President in 1985. He bought Vince McMahon's Saturday night TV time slot on Superstation WTBS and his business began to flourish. The following year, he organized the first annual Jim Crockett Sr. Memorial Cup, in which wrestlers from eight NWA regional territories participated in a day-long tag team tournament at the Louisiana Superdome in New Orleans. The Road Warriors defeated Ron Garvin & Magnum T. A. after 7½ hours to win the tournament. Although Crockett had organized the tournament as a tribute to his father, several rival promoters suspected he was using the event to further his own plans for expanding his promotion nationally.

Their suspicions increased as Crockett began holding wrestling events in Memphis and Florida without contacting the local NWA promoters. He eventually purchased promotions based in Oklahoma and Kansas City in the Mid-South territory and began airing his own televised wrestling events, which were syndicated across the United States.

==== Third term ====
Crockett was elected to a third term as NWA President in 1987. That same year he bought out Championship Wrestling from Florida and the Universal Wrestling Federation (UWF), thus acquiring such talent as wrestler Sting and commentator Jim Ross. Although initially planning to keep the UWF and NWA as separate promotions in order to promote an annual inter-promotional event similar to the Super Bowl, Crockett instead moved the old UWF headquarters from Tulsa, Oklahoma to Dallas, Texas. and incorporated its stars into his own promotion.

Crockett promoted his company, JCP, as the NWA, since he owned six NWA territories and was the NWA President, much to the confusion of fans.

=== Crockett sells his promotion to Ted Turner ===
By November 1988, Crockett was near bankruptcy and, through promoter Jim Barnett, sold his company to Ted Turner, who renamed it World Championship Wrestling (WCW). Crockett remained NWA President until 1991.

=== Short-lived attempts at returning to wrestling ===
In the early 1990s, Crockett attempted a return to wrestling, briefly serving a fourth term as NWA President. In 1994, Crockett launched the World Wrestling Network, an NWA-affiliated wrestling network. Crockett also brought the NWA back to the Dallas Sportatorium. Both projects were short-lived, and he left the sport for good in 1995.

=== Post-wrestling career ===
After his retirement from professional wrestling promoting, Crockett worked as a Texas realtor and mortgage loan originator.

== Death ==
On February 28, 2021, the Wrestling Observer Newsletter's Dave Meltzer reported that Crockett was in grave condition. Four days later, Robert Gibson reported that he died from complications of liver and kidney failure. His brother David attributed his death to COVID-19, which Crockett contracted two months earlier. He was 76.

== Awards and accomplishments ==
- Wrestling Observer Newsletter
  - Wrestling Observer Newsletter Hall of Fame (Class of 2021)

| Preceded by Bob Geigel | President of the National Wrestling Alliance; 1980–1982 | Succeeded by Bob Geigel |
| Preceded by Bob Geigel | President of the National Wrestling Alliance; 1985–1986 | Succeeded by Bob Geigel |
| Preceded by Bob Geigel | President of the National Wrestling Alliance; 1987–1991 | Succeeded by Jim Herd |
| Preceded by Seiji Sakaguchi | President of the National Wrestling Alliance; 1993–1995 (with Howard Brody, Dennis Coralluzzo and Steve Rickard) | Succeeded by Steve Rickard |
