= NWA Hard Times V =

2025 National Wrestling Alliance pay-per-view event

Hard Times V
- Promotional poster featuring various NWA wrestlers
- Promotion: National Wrestling Alliance
- Date: March 22, 2025 (aired June 3, 2025, June 10, 2025, June 17, 2025, June 24, 2025, July 1, 2025, July 8, 2025)
- City: Dothan, Alabama
- Venue: Dothan Civic Center

Supercard chronology
← Previous; Shockwave	Next → Crockett Cup

Hard Times chronology
← Previous; 2024	Next → 6

NWA Hard Times V was a professional wrestling event produced by the National Wrestling Alliance (NWA). It was the fifth event in the Hard Times chronology. It took place on March 22, 2025, at the Dothan Civic Center in Dothan, Alabama, marking the second consecutive Hard Times event to be held in the venue. The event was aired on tape delay across six episodes of NWA Powerrr on X.

== Production ==
=== Background ===
NWA Hard Times is an annual professional wrestling event produced by the National Wrestling Alliance. The inaugural Hard Times event took place on January 24, 2020, as a pay-per-view event. As of 2024, the event has served as a television taping for NWA Powerrr under the NWA's "Signature Live Events" banner.

On December 14, 2024, at Looks That Kill, which took place at the Dothan Civic Center in Dothan, Alabama, the NWA announced that it would return to the venue for Hard Times V on March 22, 2025.

=== Storylines ===
The event will feature a number professional wrestling matches with different wrestlers involved in pre-existing scripted feuds, plots, and storylines. Wrestlers are portrayed as either heels (those that portray the "bad guys"), faces (the "good guy" characters), or tweeners (characters that are neither clearly a heel or a face) as they follow a series of tension-building events, which culminate in a wrestling match or series of matches as determined by the promotion. Storylines were played out on the twenty-second season of the NWA's weekly series, Powerrr.

At Looks That Kill, Bryan Idol faced "Thrillbilly" Silas Mason in a falls count anywhere match. However, the match suddenly ended after two minutes when Idol was struck by a chair from Mason in midair while attempting a dive to the outside. The referee would award the win to Mason after determining the shot had broken Idol's clavicle, rendering him unable to continue. Mason would get on a microphone to berate Idol for his perceived weakness and cowardice. On February 21, 2025, the NWA would announce a grudge match between Idol and Mason for Hard Times V.

On December 21, 2024, the NWA announced an eight-man single-elimination tournament to determine the next challenger to the NWA Worlds Heavyweight Championship, currently held by Thom Latimer. On February 22, 2025, the promotion would announce via Instagram that the finals of the tournament, now deemed the "Dane Memorial Heavyweight Tournament" in memory of former champion Jax Dane, would take place at Hard Times V.

== Results ==
First episode (aired June 3, 2025)
No.	Results	Stipulations	Times
1	The Colóns (Primo Colón and Epico Colón) defeated Daisy Kill and Talos, The Immortals (Kratos and Odinson), and Blunt Force Trauma (Carnage and Damage) by pinfall	Four-way tag team elimination match to determine the #2 seed in the Crockett Cup	12:05
2	Crazzy Steve defeated Damien Fenrir by submission	Singles match	5:38
3	Mims (c) (with BLK Jeez) defeated Wrecking Ball Legursky by pinfall	Singles match for the NWA National Heavyweight Championship	9:02
(c) / – the champion(s) heading into the match

=== Four-way tag team elimination match ===
Eliminated	Wrestler	Team	Eliminated by	Method of elimination	Time
1	Damage	Blunt Force Trauma	Daisy Kill	Pinned with a roll-up	6:09
2	Daisy Kill	Daisy Kill and Talos	Odinson	Pinned after the Asgardian Pounce	6:39
3	Kratos	The Immortals	Primo Colón	Pinned after the Backstabber	12:05
Winners	The Colóns		—N/a		12:05

Second episode (aired June 10, 2025)
No.	Results	Stipulations	Times
1	EC3 and Pretty Boy Smooth (with Pastor C-Lo) defeated Burchill and Joe Ocasio by pinfall	Tag team match	6:35
2	Slade defeated Hunter Drake by submission	Singles match	7:54
3	Colby Corino defeated Frank (with Austin Idol) by pinfall	Dane Memorial Heavyweight Tournament final match to determine the #1 contender to the NWA Worlds Heavyweight Championship	9:26

=== Dane Memorial Heavyweight Tournament ===
Play-In (Shockwave, January 11)
Colby Corino	Pin
Sam Adonis	6:58

Quarterfinals (Shockwave, January 11)
1	"Thrillbilly" Silas Mason	8:11
8	Colby Corino	Pin
4	Burchill	Sub
5	Zyon	6:42
2	Max the Impaler	7:04
7	Frank	Pin
3	Kerry Morton	Pin
6	Wrecking Ball Legursky	7:09

Semifinals (Powerrr, February 2)
8	Colby Corino	Pin
5	Zyon^{1}	7:51
7	Frank	Pin
3	Kerry Morton	7:01

Finals (Hard Times V, March 22)
8	Colby Corino	Pin
7	Frank	9:26

1 Zyon replaced Burchill in the match due to Burchill testing positive for a "mysterious substance" (kayfabe).

Third episode (aired June 17, 2025)
No.	Results	Stipulations	Times
1	The Lost (Alex Misery, Lev, and Gaagz the Gymp) defeated Size Matters (Eric Smalls and Sam Stackhouse) and Tyler Franks by pinfall	Six-man tag team match	7:03
2	Jay Bradley defeated Slex by pinfall	Singles match	4:17
3	The Temple of Duum (Stone Rockwell and The Beastman) defeated Baron Von Storm and Brandon Barretta by pinfall	Tag team match	5:28

Fourth episode (aired June 24, 2025)
No.	Results	Stipulations	Times
1	TV-MA (Tiffany Nieves and Valentina Rossi) (with Miss Starr) defeated Kenzie Paige and Big Mama (c) by pinfall	Tag team match for the NWA World Women's Tag Team Championship	6:33
2	Mike Mondo defeated Zyon (with Austin Idol) by pinfall	Singles match	7:45
3	The Southern Six (Kerry Morton and Alex Taylor) defeated The Country Gentlemen (AJ Cazana and KC Cazana) (c) (with Joe Cazana) by pinfall	Tag team match for the NWA United States Tag Team Championship	9:04
(c) / – the champion(s) heading into the match

Fifth episode (aired July 1, 2025)
No.	Results	Stipulations	Times
1	"Thrillbilly" Silas Mason defeated Bryan Idol by pinfall	No Limits match	8:29
2	Natalia Markova defeated Kylie Paige by pinfall	Singles match to determine the #1 contender to the NWA World Women's Championship at NWA 77th Anniversary Show	11:41

Sixth episode (aired July 8, 2025)
No.	Results	Stipulations	Times
1	Knox and Murdoch (c) defeated The Slimeballz (Sage Chantz and Tommy Rant)	Ladder match for the NWA World Tag Team Championship	11:23
2	Thom Latimer (c) defeated Carson Bartholomew Drake by pinfall	Singles match for the NWA Worlds Heavyweight Championship	13:13
(c) / – the champion(s) heading into the match
