= NWA Special Supercards =

Nation Wrestling Alliance event series

- NWA Pop-Up Event logo
- Created by: William Patrick Corgan
- Promotions: National Wrestling Alliance (NWA) Various promotions
- First event: New Years Clash

NWA Special Supercards are professional wrestling supercard events promoted by the National Wrestling Alliance (NWA). Unlike the NWA's live pay-per-view (PPV) events, these events are primarily taped for future programming.

Beginning in 2019, the NWA would promote Pop-Up Events in-conjunction with various independent professional wrestling promotions. NWA President William Patrick Corgan explained the concept as "being able to work, show up anywhere in the world that appreciates moments", and partnering with local promotions. The inaugural event, New Years Clash, was held on January 5, 2019, and co-produced with Crimson's Tried-N-True Pro Wrestling in Clarksville, Tennessee. Matches from the event would later air as part of the NWA's web series, Ten Pounds of Gold.

Since 2022, the NWA has also hosted PowerrrTrip events. These events serve as tapings for future episodes of NWA Powerrr, and are usually held after the NWA's live PPV events.

With Powerrr's move to The CW network's app in 2024, future NWA events going forward are known as Signature Live Events, with matches exclusively taped for future Powerrr episodes.

== NWA Pop-Up events ==
Date	Event	Promotion	Venue	Location	Main event	Broadcast
January 5, 2019	New Years Clash	Tried-N-True Pro Wrestling	Wilma Rudolph Event Center	Clarksville, Tennessee	Nick Aldis (c) vs. James Storm for the NWA Worlds Heavyweight Championship	Ten Pounds of Gold
October 24, 2021	By Any Means Necessary	Tried-N-True Pro Wrestling	Valor Hall	Oak Grove, Kentucky	Crimson vs. Jax Dane in a Steel Cage match	NWA Powerrr

== NWA PowerrrTrip events ==
=== 2022 ===
Date	Event	Promotion	Venue	Location	Main event
February 12	PowerrrTrip	Tried-N-True Pro Wrestling	Valor Hall	Oak Grove, Kentucky	Trevor Murdoch (c) vs. Matt Cardona for the NWA Worlds Heavyweight Championship
April 30	PowerrrTrip 2	Tried-N-True Pro Wrestling	Valor Hall	Oak Grove, Kentucky	Kamille and Kenzie Paige vs. KiLynn King and Missa Kate
June 22	Knox Out	-	Knoxville Convention Center	Knoxville, Tennessee	Pretty Empowered (Ella Envy and Kenzie Paige) (c) vs. The Hex (Allysin Kay and Marti Belle) for the NWA World Women's Tag Team Championship
November 13	Revolution Rumble	WildKat Wrestling	Frederick J. Sigur Civic Center	Chalmette, Louisiana	23-man Revolution Rumble match

=== 2023 ===
Date	Event	Promotion	Venue	Location	Main event	Broadcast
March 4	The World is a Vampire: NWA vs. AAA	Lucha Libre AAA World Wide	Foro Sol Stadium	Iztacalco, Mexico City, Mexico	Tyrus (c) vs. Daga for the NWA Worlds Heavyweight Championship	TV Special
April 23	The World is a Vampire: NWA vs. WAOA	Wrestling Alliance of Australia	Kryal Castle	Ballarat, Victoria, Australia	Kerry Morton (c) vs Emman Azman for the NWA World Junior Heavyweight Championship	TV Special
July 8	HP Cares for Cooper	-	Recreation Center of Highland Park	Highland Park, Illinois	Kamille (c) vs. Natalia Markova for the NWA World Women's Championship	TV Special
July 19	Boca vs The World	Boca Raton Championship Wrestling	Boca Black Box	Boca Raton, Florida	Bull James and Gangrel vs Daisy Kill and Jack Talos	TV Special
November 18	Return to Robarts	-	Robarts Arena	Sarasota, Florida	EC3 (c) vs. Jax Dane for the NWA Worlds Heavyweight Championship	NWA Powerrr

== NWA Signature live events ==
=== 2024 ===
Date	Event	Venue	Location	Main event	Notes
January 13	Paranoia	Revolution Live	Fort Lauderdale, Florida	EC3 (c) vs. Matt Cardona in "The Ultimate Match of Death" for the NWA Worlds Heavyweight Championship	
January 13	Viva Revolution	Revolution Live	Fort Lauderdale, Florida	Jackal Stevens (c) vs. Kerry Morton for the CCW Heavyweight Championship	Co-produced with Coastal Championship Wrestling
March 2	Hard Times	Dothan Civic Center	Dothan, Alabama	Knox and Murdoch vs. The Southern 6 (Kerry Morton and Alex Taylor) in a Steel Cage match	
May 18	Crockett Cup	The OC Theater	Forney, Texas	The Southern 6 (Kerry Morton and Alex Taylor) vs. The Immortals (J. R. Kratos and Odinson) in the Crockett Cup final	
June 1	Back to the Territories	Karns High School	Knoxville, Tennessee	EC3 (c) vs. Colby Corino for the NWA Worlds Heavyweight Championship	
August 31	NWA 76th Anniversary Show	2300 Arena	Philadelphia, Pennsylvania	EC3 (c) vs. Thom Latimer for the NWA Worlds Heavyweight Championship	Aired from October 1, 2024 to October 29, 2024 as part of the first five episodes of NWA Powerrr on X
October 26	Samhain 2	WEDU Studios	Tampa, Florida	Thom Latimer (c) vs. EC3 for the NWA Worlds Heavyweight Championship	
December 14	Looks That Kill	Dothan Civic Center	Dothan, Alabama	Thom Latimer (c) vs. EC3 in a Steel Cage match for the NWA Worlds Heavyweight Championship	

=== 2025 ===
Date	Event	Venue	Location	Main event	Notes
January 11	Shockwave	The OC Theater	Forney, Texas	Thom Latimer (c) vs. Carnage for the NWA Worlds Heavyweight Championship	
March 22	Hard Times V	Dothan Civic Center	Dothan, Alabama	Thom Latimer (c) vs. Carson Bartholomew Drake for the NWA Worlds Heavyweight Championship	
May 17	Crockett Cup	2300 Arena	Philadelphia, Pennsylvania	The Immortals (Kratos and Odinson) vs. The Colóns (Eddie Colón and Orlando Colón) in the Crockett Cup final	Aired from July 29, 2025 to September 9, 2025 as part of the first seven episodes of NWA Powerrr on the Roku Sports Channel
August 16	NWA 77th Anniversary Show	The Paramount	Huntington, New York	Thom Latimer (c) vs. "Thrillbilly" Silas Mason for the NWA Worlds Heavyweight Championship	
October 17	Samhain: Part 3	Center Stage	Atlanta, Georgia	"Thrillbilly" Silas Mason (c) vs. Matt Cardona in a Peachtree Street Fight for the NWA Worlds Heavyweight Championship	

=== 2026 ===
Date	Event	Venue	Location	Main event	Notes
April 4	Crockett Cup	The OC Theatre	Forney, Texas	Titans of Calamity (Ren Ayabe and Talos) vs. The Country Gentlemen (AJ Cazana and KC Cazana) in the Crockett Cup final	Aired from May 1, 2026 to May 23, 2026 as part of the first five episodes of NWA Powerrr on Comet
June 6	Hard Times 6	Center Stage	Atlanta, Georgia	"Thrillbilly" Silas Mason (c) vs. Kerry Morton for the NWA Worlds Heavyweight Championship	
July 28	NWA 78th Anniversary Show	2300 Arena	Philadelphia, Pennsylvania	"Thrillbilly" Silas Mason (c) vs. Carson Batholomew Drake for the NWA Worlds Heavyweight Championship	
August 28	EmPowerrr	Sevierville Civic Center	Sevierville, Tennessee	Tiffany Nieves (c) vs. Alice Crowley for the NWA World Women's Championship	Co-produced with Kross Fire Wrestling

== Upcoming events ==
=== 2026 ===
Date	Event	Venue	Location	Main event	Notes
September 27	Samhain: Part IV	Turner Hall Ballroom	Milwaukee, Wisconsin	TBA	

== See also ==
- List of National Wrestling Alliance pay-per-view events
