= NWA Looks That Kill =

2024 National Wrestling Alliance event

- Promotional poster featuring EC3, Max the Impaler, Bryan Idol, and Natalia Markova
- Promotion: National Wrestling Alliance
- Date: December 14, 2024 (aired February 4, 2025, February 11, 2025, February 18, 2025, February 25, 2025, March 4, 2025)
- City: Dothan, Alabama
- Venue: Dothan Civic Center

Supercard chronology
← Previous; Samhain 2	Next → Shockwave

NWA Looks That Kill was a professional wrestling event produced by the National Wrestling Alliance (NWA). The event took place on December 14, 2024, at the Dothan Civic Center in Dothan, Alabama and aired via tape delay across five episodes of NWA Powerrr on X.

== Production ==
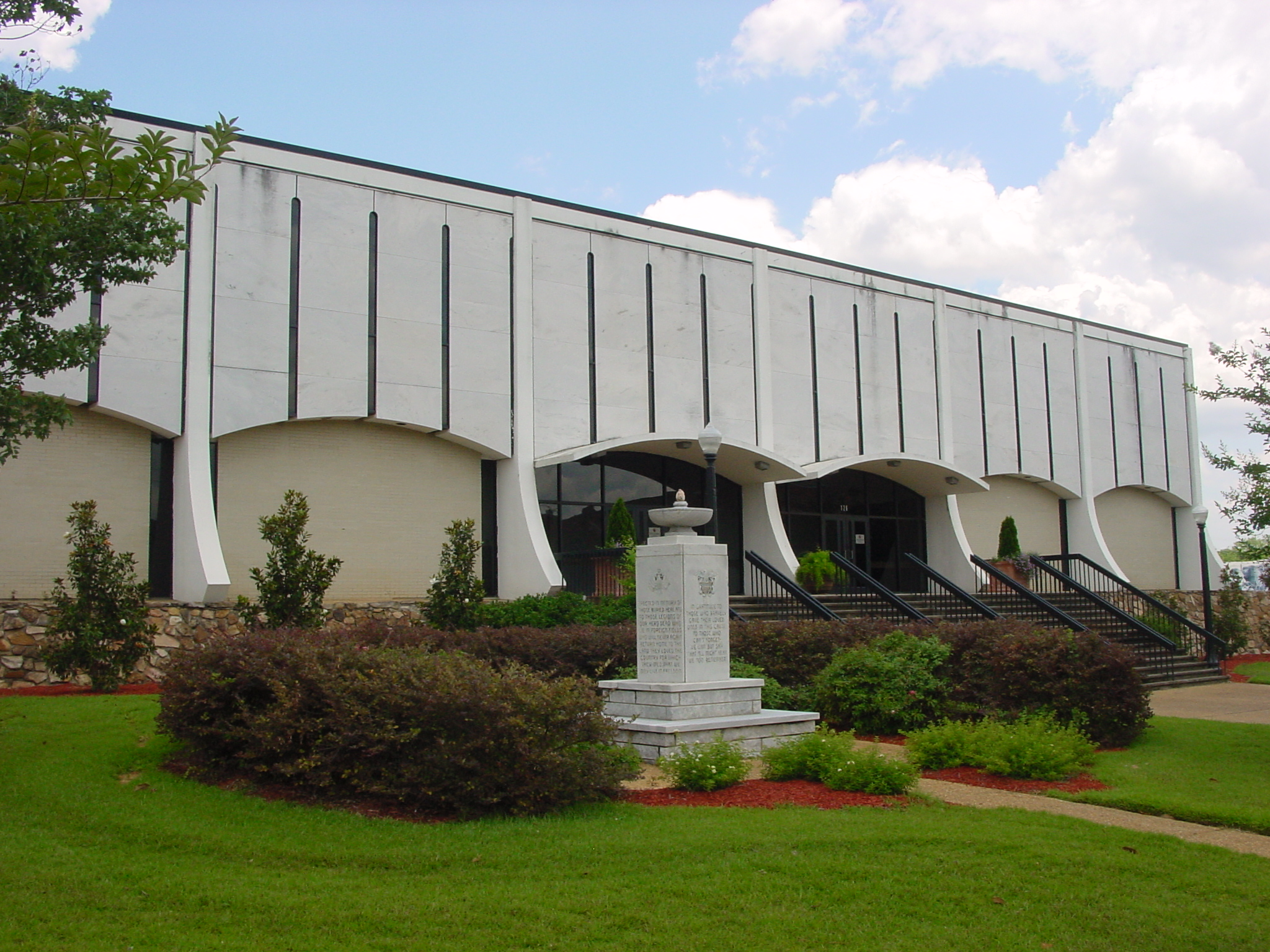
The event was held at the Dothan Civic Center in Dothan, Alabama.

=== Background ===
On March 2, 2024, at Hard Times 4, which took place at the Dothan Civic Center in Dothan, Alabama, the NWA announced that it would return to the venue for Looks That Kill on December 14, 2024.

=== Storylines ===
The event will feature a number professional wrestling matches with different wrestlers involved in pre-existing scripted feuds, plots, and storylines. Wrestlers are portrayed as either heels (those that portray the "bad guys"), faces (the "good guy" characters), or tweeners (characters that are neither clearly a heel or a face) as they follow a series of tension-building events, which culminate in a wrestling match or series of matches as determined by the promotion. Storylines were played out on the twenty-first season of the NWA's weekly series, Powerrr.

At NWA 76, Natalia Markova won the Burke Invitational Gauntlet after last eliminating Tiffany Nieves, granting her an opportunity at the NWA World Women's Championship. Markova would invoke her title shot on the November 19 episode of NWA Powerrr, where she challenged Kenzie Paige for the title. However, the match ended on a disqualification after Nieves came out and attacked Paige, costing Markova the match. Nieves, who had been critical of Markova's various opportunities at the title, would later admit in an exclusive interview to interfering in order to prevent Markova from becoming champion. As a result of this and the lingering feud between the two women, the NWA announced on November 27 that Markova and Nieves would face off at Looks That Kill in a steel cage match, marking the first women's cage match in professional wrestling held in the state of Alabama.

At Samhain 2, "HollyHood" Haley J defeated Natalia Markova and Kylie Paige in a three-way elimination match to become number one contender to the NWA World Women's Championship, for which she will challenge Kenzie Paige at Looks That Kill.

Also at Samhain 2, Daisy Kill and Talos became number one contenders to the NWA World Tag Team Championship after defeating The Immortals (Kratos and Odinson). The NWA would later announce that Kill and Talos would challenge champions Mike Knox and Trevor Murdoch for the titles at Looks That Kill.

== Results ==
First episode (aired February 4, 2025)
No.	Results	Stipulations	Times
1	The Colóns (Primo Colón and Epico Colón) defeated Size Matters (Eric Smalls and Sam Stackhouse) by pinfall	Tag team match	6:33
2	Mims (c) defeated Mr. Grim by pinfall	Singles match for the NWA National Heavyweight Championship	7:49
3	Kenzie Paige (c) defeated "HollyHood" Haley J by pinfall	Singles match for the NWA World Women's Championship	7:36
(c) / – the champion(s) heading into the match

Second episode (aired February 11, 2025)
No.	Results	Stipulations	Times
1	Knox and Murdoch (c) defeated Daisy Kill and Talos by pinfall	Tag team match for the NWA World Tag Team Championship	5:17
2	Colby Corino defeated Kerry Morton by pinfall	No Limits match	12:55
3	Kenzie Paige and Big Mama (with Kylie Paige) (Note: Kylie Paige was originally scheduled to compete in the match, but due to a shoulder injury, Kenzie Paige took her place.) defeated The It Girls (Ella Envy and Miss Starr) (c) by pinfall	Tag team match for the NWA World Women's Tag Team Championship	6:57
(c) / – the champion(s) heading into the match

Third episode (aired February 18, 2025)
No.	Results	Stipulations	Times
1	Alex Taylor (c) defeated Joe Ocasio by pinfall	Singles match for the NWA World Junior Heavyweight Championship	11:29
2	Carson Bartholomew Drake and The Slimeballz (Sage Chantz and Tommy Rant) defeated The Country Joes (Joe Cazana, AJ Cazana, and KC Cazana) by pinfall	Six-man tag team match	9:07
3	"Thrillbilly" Silas Mason defeated Bryan Idol by technical knockout	Falls Count Anywhere match	1:59
(c) / – the champion(s) heading into the match

Fourth episode (aired February 25, 2025)
No.	Results	Stipulations	Times
1	Slade (with Rolando) defeated Alex Misery, Hunter Drake and Lev by submission	Four-way match to determine the #1 contender to the NWA World Junior Heavyweight Championship	4:42
2	Mike Mondo defeated Burchill by pinfall	Singles match	6:50
3	Blunt Force Trauma (Carnage and Damage) (with Aron Stevens) defeated Kratos and Baron Von Storm by pinfall	Tag team match	8:02

Fifth episode (aired March 4, 2025)
No.	Results	Stipulations	Times
1	Max the Impaler defeated Tyler Franks by pinfall	Singles match	4:57
2	Natalia Markova defeated Tiffany Nieves by pinfall	Steel Cage match	10:29
3	Thom Latimer (c) defeated EC3 by pinfall	Steel Cage match for the NWA Worlds Heavyweight Championship	13:27
(c) / – the champion(s) heading into the match
