= Crockett Cup (2025) =

2025 National Wrestling Alliance professional wrestling show

- Promotional poster featuring various NWA wrestlers
- Promotion: National Wrestling Alliance
- Date: May 17, 2025 (aired July 29, 2025, August 5, 2025, August 12, 2025, August 19, 2025, August 26, 2025, September 2, 2025, September 9, 2025)
- City: Philadelphia, Pennsylvania
- Venue: 2300 Arena
- Attendance: 800

Supercard chronology
← Previous; Hard Times V	Next → 77th Anniversary Show

Crockett Cup chronology
← Previous; 2024	Next → 2026

The 2025 iteration of the Crockett Cup was a professional wrestling tag team tournament produced by the National Wrestling Alliance (NWA). It was the eighth iteration in the Crockett Cup chronology. The event took place on May 17, 2025, at the 2300 Arena in Philadelphia, Pennsylvania, and aired on tape delay across seven episodes of NWA Powerrr on The Roku Channel.

== Production ==
=== Background ===
The Crockett Cup is a tag team tournament first held in April 1986. National Wrestling Alliance (NWA) member Jim Crockett Promotions (JCP), headed by Jim Crockett Jr., hosted the Crockett Cup, held in honor of Crockett's father, JCP founder Jim Crockett Sr. and saw participation of teams from various NWA territories. JCP held the tournament again in 1987 and 1988, before JCP was sold to Ted Turner later that year. In July 2017, the Crockett Foundation, with Classic Pro Wrestling, held the "Crockett Foundation Cup Tag Team Tournament" in New Kent, Virginia, which was not affiliated with the NWA. Bobby Fulton, The Barbarian, and The Rock 'n' Roll Express, all former Crockett Cup participants, took part in the event as a link to the original tournaments.

The original concept of the Crockett Cup was a single elimination tag team tournament, with the storyline prize of $1,000,000.00 given to the winning team along with a large trophy. The 1986 and 1987 tournaments featured 24 teams, while the 1988 version had 22 teams competing. Each tournament was split over two shows to encompass all 23 tournament matches as well as non-tournament matches; in 1986, JCP held a show in the afternoon and another in the evening, while the 1987 and 1988, the tournament was spread out over two days instead.

On March 4, 2025, it was announced that the Crockett Cup would return and would be held in on May 18, at the 2300 Arena in Philadelphia, Pennsylvania.

=== Storylines ===
The event will feature a number professional wrestling matches with different wrestlers involved in pre-existing scripted feuds, plots, and storylines. Wrestlers are portrayed as either heels (those that portray the "bad guys"), faces (the "good guy" characters), or tweeners (characters that are neither clearly a heel or a face) as they follow a series of tension-building events, which culminate in a wrestling match or series of matches as determined by the promotion. Storylines were played out on the twenty-third season of the NWA's weekly series, Powerrr.

Upon the announcement of the annual event, it was confirmed that WWE's Natalya would compete at the Crockett Cup. The NWA would later announce that Natalya would be facing Kenzie Paige for the NWA World Women's Championship. Originally, the NWA announced that wrestling legend Gail Kim, who was previously announced for an autograph signing at the event, would also serve as the special guest referee for this match, but had to pull out of the event due to illness.

At Hard Times V, Thom Latimer successfully defended the NWA Worlds Heavyweight Championship against Carson Bartholomew Drake. As he was celebrating, however, the lights went out; when they came back on, former NWA Worlds Heavyweight Champion Rhino appeared in the ring. Rhino attacked Drake and allies The Slimeballz (Sage Chantz and Tommy Rant) before confronting Latimer. The NWA would later announce that Rhino would challenge Latimer for the world title at the Crockett Cup, which was taking place at the 2300 Arena, the main venue of Rhino's former home promotion Extreme Championship Wrestling (ECW). However, on May 15, the NWA announced that Philadelphia native Colby Corino, who won the Dane Memorial Heavyweight Tournament at Hard Times V to earn a world title shot, would invoke his opportunity at the Crockett Cup, officially making the world title bout a three-way match.

== Results ==
First episode (aired July 29, 2025)
No.	Results	Stipulations	Times
1	The Slimeballz (Sage Chantz and Tommy Rant) won by last eliminating The JV Squad (Dalton McKenzie and Jack Vaughn) (Note: The other teams were: Temple of Duum (Beastman and Stone Rockwell), Adrianna Mosley and Tim Theory, Shawn Carlson and Ty Awesome, South Philly's Finest (Jimmy Konway and Luca Brazzi), Foxx Vinyer and Joe Ocasio, Size Matters (Eric Smalls and Sam Stackhouse), and Moses and Mr. Grim.)	David Crockett Invitational Tag Team Battle Royal to determine the #12 seed in the Crockett Cup	7:30
2	The Slimeballz (Sage Chantz and Tommy Rant) defeated Blunt Force Trauma (Carnage and Damage) (with Aron Stevens) by pinfall	Crockett Cup first round match	2:16
3	The Holy Grail (EC3 and Pretty Boy Smooth) (with Pastor C-Lo) defeated The Lost (Alex Misery and Crazzy Steve) (with Father James Mitchell, Gaagz the Gymp, and Lev) by pinfall	Crockett Cup first round match	6:41
4	Bryan Idol defeated Carson Bartholomew Drake by pinfall	Singles match for the vacant NWA World Television Championship	6:42

Second episode (aired August 5, 2025)
No.	Results	Stipulations	Times
1	Daisy Kill and Talos defeated The Nightmare Syndicate (Zyon and Frank) (with Austin Idol) by pinfall	Crockett Cup first round match	7:17
2	Mike Mondo and Slade (with Rolando) defeated The Country Gentlemen (AJ Cazana and KC Cazana) (with Joe Cazana) by submission	Crockett Cup first round match	7:45
3	Natalia Markova defeated Kylie Paige by pinfall	No Limits match	8:27

Third episode (aired August 12, 2025)
No.	Results	Stipulations	Times
1	TV-MA (Tiffany Nieves and Valentina Rossi) (c) (with Miss Starr) defeated The Island Twins (Ta'ahine Tonga and Tala-vou Tonga) by pinfall	Tag team match for the NWA World Women's Tag Team Championship	4:53
2	The Immortals (Kratos and Odinson) defeated The Slimeballz (Sage Chantz and Tommy Rant) by pinfall	Crockett Cup quarterfinal match	7:39
3	The Holy Grail (EC3 and Pretty Boy Smooth) (with Pastor C-Lo) defeated The Southern Six (Kerry Morton and Alex Taylor) by pinfall	Crockett Cup quarterfinal match	9:09
(c) / – the champion(s) heading into the match

Fourth episode (aired August 19, 2025)
No.	Results	Stipulations	Times
1	Wrecking Ball Legursky defeated Jay Bradley by pinfall	Chain match	6:15
2	The Colóns (Primo Colón and Epico Colón) defeated Daisy Kill and Talosby pinfall	Crockett Cup quarterfinal match	7:30
3	Knox and Murdoch (with Eric Smalls) defeated Mike Mondo and Slade (with Rolando) by pinfall	Crockett Cup quarterfinal match	8:11

Fifth episode (aired August 26, 2025)
No.	Results	Stipulations	Times
1	Mims (c) (with BLK Jeez) defeated Max the Impaler by pinfall	Singles match for the NWA National Heavyweight Championship	6:59
2	"Thrillbilly" Silas Mason defeated Hammerstone by pinfall	Singles match	12:29
(c) / – the champion(s) heading into the match

Sixth episode (aired September 2, 2025)
No.	Results	Stipulations	Times
1	The Colóns (Primo Colón and Epico Colón) defeated The Holy Grail (EC3 and Pretty Boy Smooth) (with Pastor C-Lo) by pinfall	Crockett Cup semifinal match	11:32
2	The Immortals (Kratos and Odinson) defeated Knox and Murdoch (with Eric Smalls) by pinfall	Crockett Cup semifinal match	10:05

Seventh episode (aired September 9, 2025)
No.	Results	Stipulations	Times
1^{D}	Kenzie Paige (c) defeated Nattie Neidhart by pinfall	Singles match for the NWA World Women's Championship	11:25
2	Thom Latimer (c) defeated Rhino and Colby Corino by pinfall	Three-way match for the NWA Worlds Heavyweight Championship	14:00
3	The Immortals (Kratos and Odinson) defeated The Colóns (Primo Colón and Epico Colón) by pinfall	Crockett Cup final	12:24
(c) / – the champion(s) heading into the match; D / – this was a dark match

=== 2025 Crockett Cup tournament bracket ===
First round
8	The Country Gentlemen (AJ Cazana and KC Cazana)	7:45
9	Mike Mondo and Slade	Sub
5	Blunt Force Trauma (Carnage and Damage)	2:16
12	The Slimeballz (Sage Chantz and Tommy Rant)	Pin
7	Daisy Kill and Talos	Pin
10	The Nightmare Syndicate (Zyon and Frank)	7:17
6	The Holy Grail (EC3 and Pretty Boy Smooth)	Pin
11	The Lost (Alex Misery and Crazzy Steve)	6:41

Quarter-finals
1	Knox and Murdoch	Pin
9	Mike Mondo and Slade	8:11
4	The Immortals (Kratos and Odinson)	Pin
12	The Slimeballz	7:39
2	The Colóns (Primo Colón and Epico Colón)	Pin
7	Daisy Kill and Talos	7:30
3	The Southern Six (Kerry Morton and Alex Taylor)	9:09
6	The Holy Grail	Pin

Semi-finals
1	Knox and Murdoch	10:05
4	The Immortals	Pin
2	The Colóns	Pin
6	The Holy Grail	11:32

Final
4	The Immortals	Pin
2	The Colóns	12:24

== See also ==
- 2025 in professional wrestling
