= NWA Shockwave (2025 event) =

2025 National Wrestling Alliance pay-per-view event

- Promotional poster featuring various NWA wrestlers
- Promotion: National Wrestling Alliance
- Date: January 11, 2025 (aired March 11, 2025, March 18, 2025, March 25, 2025, April 1, 2025, April 8, 2025, April 15, 2025)
- City: Forney, Texas
- Venue: The OC Theatre

Supercard chronology
| ← Previous; Looks That Kill | Next → Hard Times V |

NWA Shockwave was a professional wrestling event produced by the National Wrestling Alliance (NWA). It took place on January 11, 2025, at The OC Theatre in Forney, Texas, and was aired on tape delay across six episodes of NWA Powerrr on X.

== Production ==
=== Background ===
On September 26, 2024, the NWA announced that NWA Shockwave would take place at The OC Theatre in Forney, Texas, on January 11, 2025.

=== Storylines ===
The event will feature a number professional wrestling matches with different wrestlers involved in pre-existing scripted feuds, plots, and storylines. Wrestlers are portrayed as either heels (those that portray the "bad guys"), faces (the "good guy" characters), or tweeners (characters that are neither clearly a heel or a face) as they follow a series of tension-building events, which culminate in a wrestling match or series of matches as determined by the promotion. Storylines were played out on the twenty-first season of the NWA's weekly series, Powerrr.

On December 21, 2024, the NWA announced an eight-man single-elimination tournament to determine the number one contender to the NWA Worlds Heavyweight Championship, which would be set to begin at Shockwave. Colby Corino, Sam Adonis, and Tyler Franks were later announced to compete in a three-way play-in match to determine the number eight seed in the tournament, but later Franks was pulled off from this match. The first official match in the tournament was announced on December 27, with The Southern Six's Kerry Morton (#3 seed) facing Wrecking Ball Legursky (#6 seed) of The Fixers. On December 28, Burchill (#4 seed) and Zyon (#5 seed) were announced to wrestle each other in the first round as well.

== Results ==
First episode (aired March 11, 2025)
| No. | Results | Stipulations | Times |
|---|---|---|---|
| 1 | Colby Corino defeated Sam Adonis by pinfall | Singles match Play-In Match to determine the 8 seed in the Dane Memorial Heavyweight Tournament. | 6:58 |
| 2 | Kenzie Paige and Big Mama (c) defeated CJ and Mystii Marks by pinfall | Tag team match for the NWA World Women's Tag Team Championship | 6:18 |
| 3 | Kerry Morton defeated Wrecking Ball Legursky by pinfall | Dane Memorial Heavyweight Tournament first round match | 7:09 |
(c) / – the champion(s) heading into the match

Second episode (aired March 18, 2025)
| No. | Results | Stipulations | Times |
|---|---|---|---|
| 1 | Alex Misery vs. Gaagz the Gymp ended in a no contest | Hair vs. Mask match Joe Ocasio was the special guest referee. | 9:49 |
| 2 | The Money Birds (Gigi Rey and Lady Bird Monroe) defeated Miss Starr and Tiffany Nieves by pinfall | Tag team match | 4:43 |
| 3 | Frank (with Brandon McCord) defeated Max the Impaler by pinfall | Dane Memorial Heavyweight Tournament first round match | 7:04 |

Third episode (aired March 25, 2025)
| No. | Results | Stipulations | Times |
|---|---|---|---|
| 1 | Carson Bartholomew Drake (c) vs. Alex Misery ended in a time limit draw | Singles match for the NWA World Television Championship | 6:05 |
| 2 | Burchill defeated Zyon (with Brandon McCord) by submission | Dane Memorial Heavyweight Tournament first round match | 6:42 |
| 3 | The Immortals (Kratos and Odinson) defeated Daisy Kill and Talos by pinfall | Tag team match | 6:53 |
(c) / – the champion(s) heading into the match

Fourth episode (aired April 1, 2025)
| No. | Results | Stipulations | Times |
|---|---|---|---|
| 1 | Alex Taylor (c) defeated Slade by pinfall | Singles match for the NWA World Junior Heavyweight Championship | 7:24 |
| 2 | Ruthie Jay defeated La Rosa Negra by pinfall | Empty Arena match | 9:09 |
| 3 | Colby Corino defeated "Thrillbilly" Silas Mason by pinfall | Dane Memorial Heavyweight Tournament first round match | 8:11 |
(c) / – the champion(s) heading into the match

Fifth episode (aired April 8, 2025)
| No. | Results | Stipulations | Times |
|---|---|---|---|
| 1 | The Country Gentlemen (AJ Cazana and KC Cazana) (with Joe Cazana) defeated Size Matters (Eric Smalls and Sam Stackhouse) by pinfall | Tag team match | 7:53 |
| 2 | Mims (c) (with BLK Jeez) defeated Mike Mondo by pinfall | Singles match for the NWA National Heavyweight Championship | 6:08 |
| 3 | Knox defeated The Slimeballz (Sage Chantz and Tommy Rant) by pinfall | 2-on-1 Handicap match | 0:52 |
| 4 | The Slimeballz (Sage Chantz and Tommy Rant) defeated Knox by pinfall | 2-on-1 Handicap match (Note: The match was originally scheduled to be Knox and Murdoch defending the NWA World Tag Team Championship against The Slimeballz, but due to travel delays, Murdoch was unable to make the show.); Since The Slimeballz won, they have earned two opportunities at the NWA World Tag Team Championship. | 3:11 |
(c) / – the champion(s) heading into the match

Sixth episode (aired April 15, 2025)
| No. | Results | Stipulations | Times |
|---|---|---|---|
| 1 | Natalia Markova (with Bryan Idol) defeated Hunter Drake (with Kylie Paige) by pinfall | Intergender match Had Markova lost, she would never challenge Kenzie Paige for the NWA World Women's Championship again. | 6:48 |
| 2 | Pretty Boy Smooth (c) (with EC3) vs. Baron Von Storm ended in a no contest | Singles match for the NWA Exodus Pro Midwest Championship | 1:22 |
| 3 | Baron Von Storm and Bam Bam Malone defeated Pretty Boy Smooth and Brandon Barretta (with EC3) by pinfall | Tag team match | 3:04 |
| 4 | Thom Latimer (c) defeated Carnage (with Aron Stevens) by pinfall | Singles match for the NWA Worlds Heavyweight Championship | 12:41 |
(c) / – the champion(s) heading into the match
