= NWA Samhain 2 =

2024 National Wrestling Alliance event

- Promotional poster featuring various NWA wrestlers
- Promotion: National Wrestling Alliance
- Date: October 26, 2024 (aired December 3, 2024, December 10, 2024, December 17, 2024, December 24, 2024, December 31, 2024)
- City: Tampa, Florida
- Venue: WEDU Studios

Supercard chronology
← Previous; 76th Anniversary Show	Next → Looks That Kill

Samhain chronology
← Previous; 1	Next → Part 3

NWA Samhain (Note: /sɑːwɪn/ SAH-win, /ˈsaʊɪn/ SOW-in) 2 was a professional wrestling event produced by the National Wrestling Alliance (NWA). It was the second event in the Samhain chronology and took place on October 26, 2024, at WEDU Studios in Tampa, Florida, airing on tape delay across five episodes of NWA Powerrr on X.

== Production ==
=== Background ===
NWA Samhain was originally a pay-per-view event produced by the NWA that took place on October 28, 2023. The event was notable for a segment where Father James Mitchell, the event's host, along with several people, ingested cocaine and other illicit substances. This segment allegedly soured the NWA's broadcasting deal with The CW to air NWA Powerrr and other programming on television, but NWA President William Patrick Corgan rebutted that was not the case.

On June 7, 2024, the NWA announced that Samhain 2 would take place on October 26, 2024, at Robarts Arena in Sarasota, Florida. However, on October 12, the NWA announced that the event would be moved to WEDU Studios in Tampa, Florida, due to Robarts Arena being used for relief efforts after Hurricane Milton.

=== Storylines ===
The event will feature a number professional wrestling matches with different wrestlers involved in pre-existing scripted feuds, plots, and storylines. Wrestlers are portrayed as either heels (those that portray the "bad guys"), faces (the "good guy" characters), or tweeners (characters that are neither clearly a heel or a face) as they follow a series of tension-building events, which culminate in a wrestling match or series of matches as determined by the promotion. Storylines were played out on the twentieth season of the NWA's weekly series, Powerrr.

As part of the ongoing rivalry between EC3 and Thom Latimer, the former would successfully defend the NWA Worlds Heavyweight Championship against the latter in a No Limits match at the inaugural Samhain event in 2023. Nearly a year later at NWA 76, Latimer finally defeated EC3 to win the title. On October 14, the NWA announced that EC3 would have his rematch against new champion Latimer at Samhain 2.

After several chances, including at the inaugural Samhain event, Mike Knox and Trevor Murdoch finally captured the NWA World Tag Team Championship from Blunt Force Trauma (Carnage and Damage), having Eric Smalls neutralize the interference of Aron Stevens to get the win. On October 15, the NWA announced via Instagram that Knox and Murdoch would once again face BFT, this time defending the titles, at Samhain 2.

At the NWA 76th Anniversary Show, Jack Cartwheel defeated Alex Misery to become the number one contender to the NWA World Junior Heavyweight Championship. It was later announced on October 17 that Cartwheel would challenge champion Alex Taylor at Samhain 2.

At NWA 76, Mims captured the NWA National Heavyweight Championship after winning a four-way elimination match, eliminating Burchill and Carson Drake in succession to win the title. On October 18, the NWA's Instagram announced that Mims would defend the National Heavyweight Title against Burchill at Samhain 2.

== Results ==
First episode (aired on December 3, 2024)
No.	Results	Stipulations	Times
1	The Country Gentlemen (Joe Cazana, AJ Cazana, and KC Cazana) defeated The Slimeballz (Sage Chantz and Tommy Rant) and Jay Bradley by pinfall	By The Book Street Fight	8:16
2	"HollyHood" Haley J defeated Kylie Paige and Natalia Markova by pinfall	Three-way elimination match to determine the #1 contender to the NWA World Women's Championship	8:24
3	Daisy Kill and Talos defeated The Immortals (Kratos and Odinson) by pinfall	Tag team match to determine the #1 contenders to the NWA World Tag Team Championship	11:49

=== NWA World Women's Championship #1 Contender's match ===
Eliminated	Wrestler	Eliminated by	Method of elimination	Time
1	Kylie Paige	Natalia Markova	Pinned after the Beautiful Destruction	5:05
2	Natalia Markova	"HollyHood" Haley J	Pinned after a curb stomp	8:24
Winner	"HollyHood" Haley J	—N/a		8:24

Second episode (aired on December 10, 2024)
No.	Results	Stipulations	Times
1	Alex Misery vs. Lev ended in a no contest	Singles match	4:08
2	Colby Corino and Bryan Idol defeated The Southern Six (Kerry Morton and "Thrillbilly" Silas Mason) by pinfall	Tag team match	9:01
3	Carson Bartholomew Drake defeated Max the Impaler (c) (with Father James Mitchell) by pinfall	Hell Awaits match for the NWA World Television Championship	10:06
(c) / – the champion(s) heading into the match

Third episode (aired on December 17, 2024)
No.	Results	Stipulations	Times
1	The It Girls (Ella Envy and Miss Starr) (c) defeated Caribbean Flow (La Rosa Negra and Ruthie Jay) by pinfall	Tag team match for the NWA World Women's Tag Team Championship; No Time Limit and No Count Outs	12:19
2	Mims (c) (with BLK Jeez) defeated Burchill by pinfall	Singles match for the NWA National Heavyweight Championship	9:04
3	Baron Von Storm and Jax Dane defeated Zyon and "Magic" Jake Dumas (with Austin Idol) by pinfall	Tag team match Storm was banned from using the clawhold.	7:53
(c) / – the champion(s) heading into the match

Fourth episode (aired on December 24, 2024)
No.	Results	Stipulations	Times
1	Kenzie Paige (c) defeated Tiffany Nieves by pinfall	Singles match for the NWA World Women's Championship	9:01
2	The Temple of Duum (Stone Rockwell and The Beastman) defeated The Heavenly Butterflies (Faboo Andre and Tony Donati) by pinfall	Tag team match	2:37
3	Alex Taylor (c) defeated Jack Cartwheel by pinfall	No Limits match for the NWA World Junior Heavyweight Championship	11:57
(c) / – the champion(s) heading into the match

Fifth episode (aired on December 31, 2024)
No.	Results	Stipulations	Times
1	Knox and Murdoch (c) defeated Blunt Force Trauma (Carnage and Damage) (with Aron Stevens) by pinfall	Tag team match for the NWA World Tag Team Championship; Eric Smalls was locked by the ringside area in a shark cage.	10:54
2	Thom Latimer (c) vs. EC3 ended in a no contest	Singles match for the NWA Worlds Heavyweight Championship	13:24
(c) / – the champion(s) heading into the match
