= Sam Stackhouse =

American professional wrestler (born 1989)

- Stackhouse in August 2026

Personal information
- Born: Sam Moore; July 12, 1989 (age 37) Tulsa, Oklahoma, U.S.
- Spouse: Chelsea Stackhouse (m. 2016)

Professional wrestling career
- Ring name: Sam Stackhouse One Man Sam Silo Sam Big Dam Sam Mr. Happy
- Billed height: 190 cm (6 ft 3 in)
- Billed weight: 154 kg (340 lb)
- Debut: October 17, 2009

Sam Moore, better known by his ring name Sam Stackhouse, is an American professional wrestler, currently working as a freelancer and primarily working for Game Changer Wrestling (GCW) and Juggalo Championship Wrestling (JCW). He also performs on the independent circuit such as Wrestling Revolver, and the National Wrestling Alliance (NWA). He has made briefly appearances for All Elite Wrestling (AEW).

== Professional wrestling career ==
=== Independent circuit (2009–present) ===
Moore made his professional wrestling debut at a house show promoted by Compound Pro Wrestling (CPW) on October 17, 2009, where he defeated Dutch Hagen and Kobra Kai in three-way competition. Besides CPW, he shared tenures with various promotions from the American independent scene such as Steel Rage Pro Wrestling (SRPW), Body Progression Wrestling (BPW) and others.

Moore made his All Elite Wrestling debut at AEW Dynamite #327 episode from January 7, 2026, where he teamed up with Colton Theron Vaught in a losing effort against The Outrunners (Truth Magnum and Turbo Floyd).

=== Game Changer Wrestling (2021–present) ===
Moore made his debut in Game Changer Wrestling at GCW Off The Rails on August 20, 2021, where he unsuccessfully challenged Matt Cardona for the GCW World Championship. Stackhouse competed for various other accomplishments. At GCW Homecoming Weekend 2026 from August 15, he teamed up with KJ Orso and defeated Bustah and the Brain (Alec Price and Jordan Oliver) to win the GCW Tag Team Championship.

Moore competed in several of the promotion's signature events. In the Joey Janela's Spring Break series, he made his firts appearance at the Spring Break 6 on April 1, 2022, where he competed in the traditional Clusterfuck Battle Royal, bout won by AJ Gray, Mance Warner and Matthew Justice. At Spring Break X from April 18, 2026, Moore and KJ Orso fell short to Jurassic Express ("Jungle" Jack Perry and Marko Stunt) in tag team competition. At The People vs. GCW on January 19, 2025, Stackhouse competed in a Rumble match won by PCO by last eliminating 2 Tuff Tony. At GCW Amerikaz Most Wanted on March 30, 2025, Moore fell short to Otis Cogar in a Death match.

=== Juggalo Championship Wrestling (2023–present) ===
In Juggalo Championship Wrestling (JCW), Moore has competed in the promotion under the name "Mr. Happy". On June 8, 2023, Moore made his JCW debut as Mr. Happy at Bloodymania 18, fighting against Cotton Candy and Matthew Omen. On the March 28, 2025 episode of Lunacy, Moore returned to JCW as a member of Jasmin St. Claire's St. Claire Monster Corporation in a six-man tag team match when he teamed up with Kongo Kong and Painful Paul against Luigi Primo and the Brothers of Funstruction. On August 15, 2026 during the 2 Day War pay-per-view, Moore competed in a 20-man battle riot match which featured several wrestlers representing JCW and GCW.

=== National Wrestling Alliance (2024–present) ===
Stackhouse made his debut in National Wrestling Alliance promoted events at NWA Looks That Kill on December 14, 2024, where he teamed up with Eric Smalls as "Size Matters" in a losing effort against The Colóns (Primo Colón and Epico Colón). At NWA Shockwae on April 8, 2025, he teamed up again with smalls, this time in a losing effort against The Country Gentlemen (AJ Cazana and KC Cazana). At NWA Hard Times V on March 22, 2025, Moore and Smalls teamed up with Tyler Franks in a losing effort against The Lost (Alex Misery, Lev, and Gaagz the Gymp). On the first episode of the Crockett Cup from July 29, 2025, Moore and Smalls competed in the David Crockett Invitational Tag Team Battle Royal to determine the #12 seed in the Crockett Cup, bout won by The Slimeballz (Sage Chantz and Tommy Rant).

== Championships and accomplishments ==
- Body Progression Wrestling
  - BPW 365 Championship (9 times)
  - BPW Oklahoma Championship (4 times)
  - BPW Oklahoma Tag Team Championship (1 time) – with Mike Starr
- Buzzsaw Championship Wrestling
  - BCW Heavyweight Championship (1 time)
  - BCW Buzzsaw Championship (2 times)
- Compound Pro Wrestling
  - ComPro Showtime Championship (1 time)
- Core Professional Wrestling
  - CPW Tag Team Championship (2 times) – with Samuel Savage
- Empire Championship Wrestling
  - EPW All-American Championship (1 time)
- Game Changer Wrestling
  - GCW Tag Team Championship (1 time, current) – with KJ Orso
- HOT Pro Wrestling
  - HOT Championship (1 time)
- Loko Wrestling
  - Loko Championship (2 times)
- Mid South Wrestling Alliance
  - MSWA Mid-South Cruiserweight Championship (1 time)
- Pro Wrestling Illustrated
  - Ranked No. 329 of the top 500 singles wrestlers in the PWI 500 in 2026
- Steel Rage Pro Wrestling
  - SRPW Heavyweight Championship (3 times)
  - SRPW Tag Team Championship (1 time) – with Crossfire Morrison
- United Wrestling Entertainment
  - UWE Apex Championship (1 time)
  - UWE Tag Team Championship (1 time) – with Drake Gallows
- Unified Wrestling Oklahoma
  - UWO Championship (1 time)
- Wrestling For A Cause
  - WFC Heavyweight Championship (2 times)
  - WFC Hometown Heroes Championship (1 time)
  - WFC Tag Team Championship (1 time) – with Drake Gallows

Classement PWI 500
| Year | 2025 | 2026 |
|---|---|---|
| Rank | 408 | ▲329 |
