= Dothan Civic Center =

Multi-purpose arena in Dothan, Alabama

Coordinates: 31°13′29″N 85°23′24″W

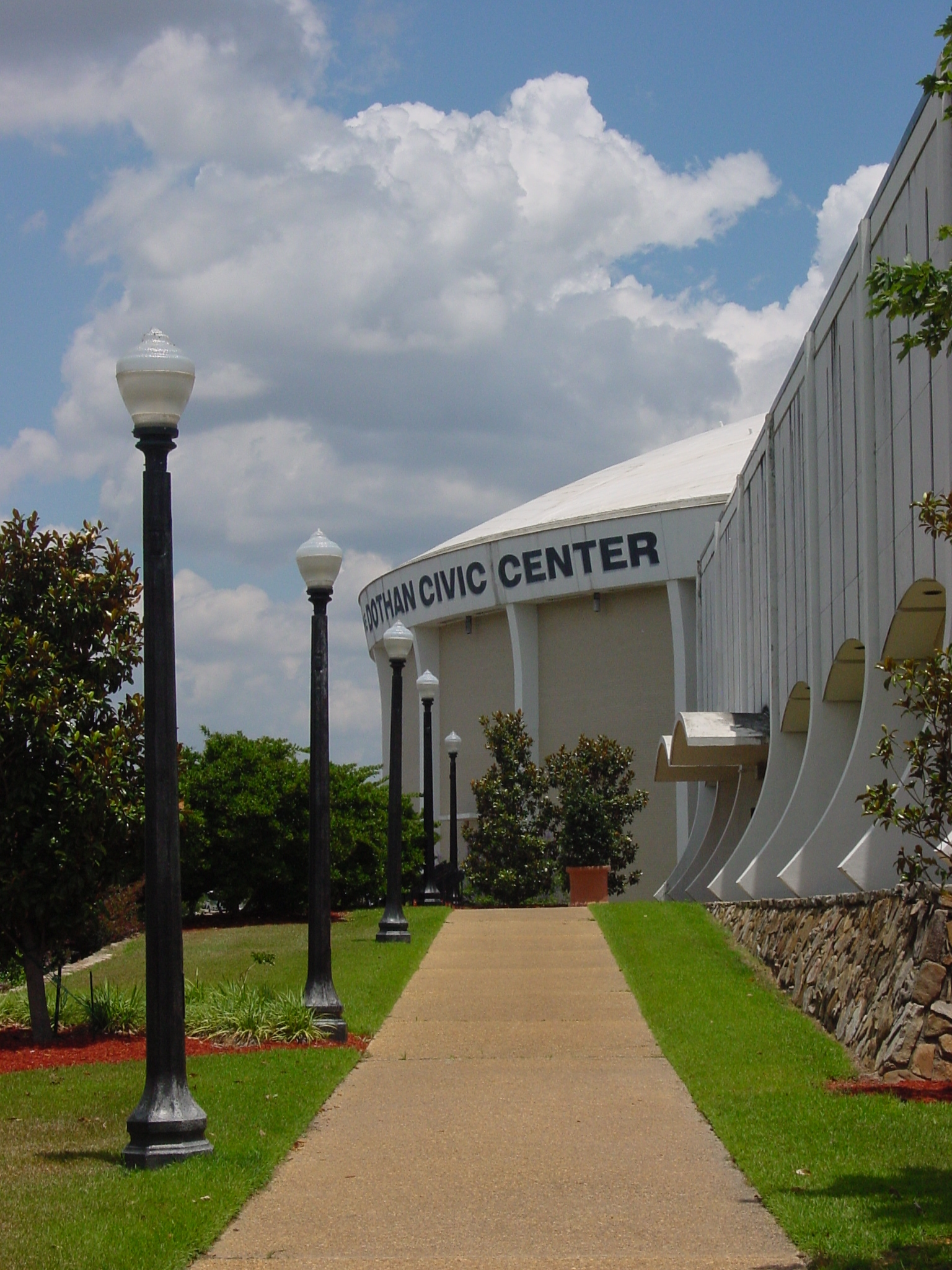

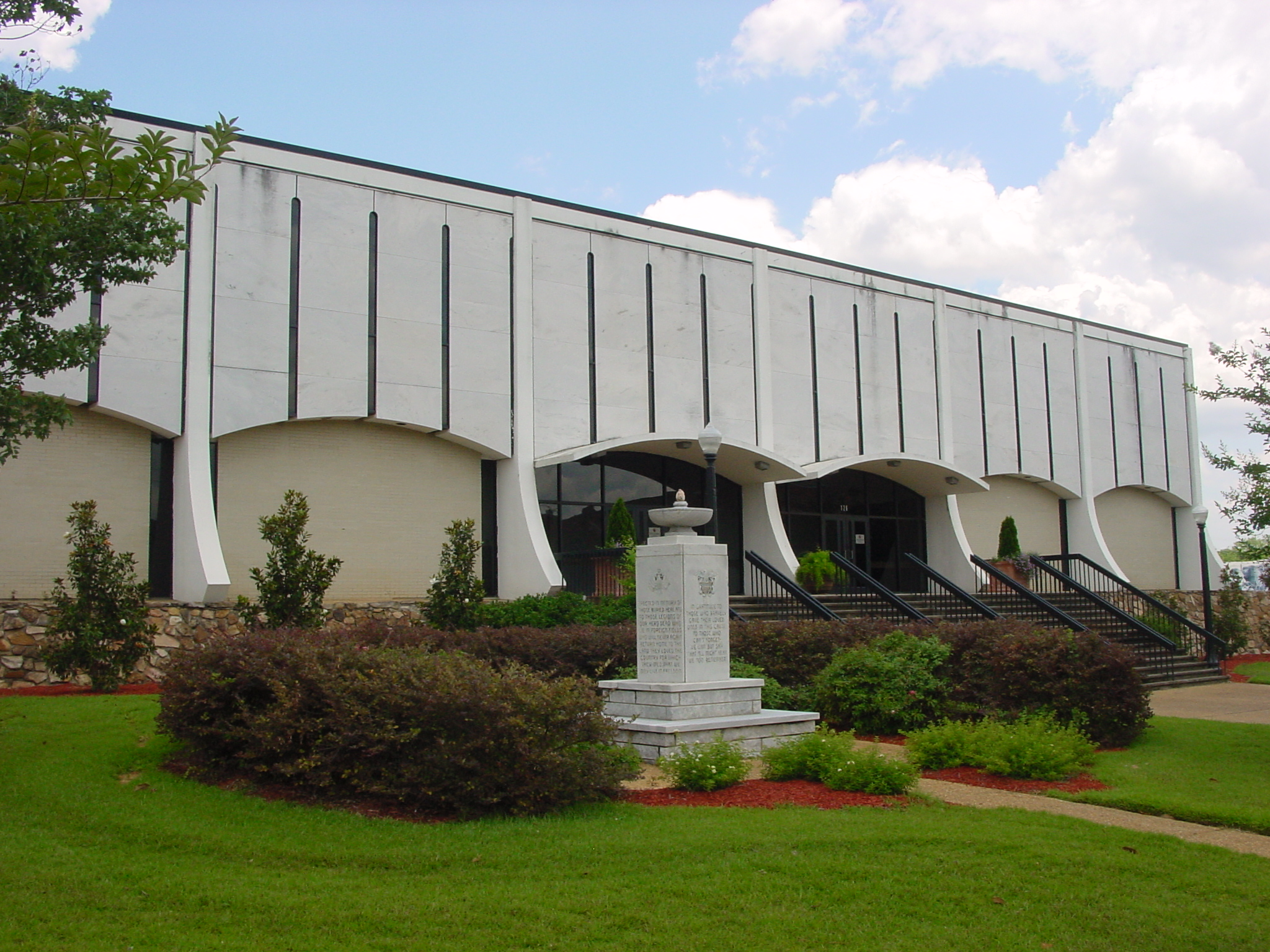

Dothan Civic Center is a 3,100-seat multi-purpose arena located in Dothan, Alabama.

It hosts local sporting events and concerts. Ultimate Fighting Championship 12 was held at Dothan Civic Center.

== History ==
The arena had its groundbreaking ceremony on August 2, 1972. The building complex was named the Dothan Civic Center and Driggers Municipal Building and opened in 1974.

Events and tenants
Preceded by Fair Park Arena	Ultimate Fighting Championship venue UFC 12	Succeeded by Augusta Civic Center
