= Colby Corino =

American professional wrestler (born 1996)

- Corino in July 2026

Personal information
- Born: Colby Corino; August 28, 1996 (age 30) Philadelphia, Pennsylvania, U.S.
- Family: Steve Corino (father); Allison Danger (aunt); Ares (uncle)

Professional wrestling career
- Ring name(s): American Tiger; Colby Corino
- Billed height: 5 ft 10 in (178 cm)
- Billed weight: 185 lb (84 kg)
- Trained by: Bob Evans; Michael Kehner; Steve Corino
- Debut: 2001

Colby Corino (born August 28, 1996) is an American professional wrestler. He is the son of professional wrestler Steve Corino. He is currently signed to the National Wrestling Alliance (NWA), where he is a former one-time NWA World Junior Heavyweight Champion. He is best known for his tenure with Ring of Honor (ROH) and CWF Mid-Atlantic.

== Professional wrestling career ==
=== Early career (2001–2015) ===
Corino wrestled his first match in 2001 as a child, teaming with his father to defeat Don Montoya and Reckless Youth in a tag team match promoted by the United Wrestling Coalition (UWC). He made further appearances with the UWC in 2006 and 2008. He began wrestling regularly on the independent circuit in 2009.

From 2013 to 2015, Corino used the ring name "American Tiger", suggested by his father.

=== Ring of Honor (2014–2016) ===
Corino signed a contract with Ring of Honor in 2014 and debuted the following year, joining The Decade and aligning himself with B. J. Whitmer, Jimmy Jacobs and Adam Page as their "young boy". The addition of Corino to The Decade caused friction between Whitmer and Jacobs, leading to a match between the two at Supercard of Honor IX, won by Whitmer in what would go on to be Jacobs' final match in Ring of Honor. After Jacobs' departure, as part of the "young boy" storyline, Whitmer would regularly berate, embarrass and even attack Corino in front of his father, then-color commentator and former professional wrestler Steve Corino. Whitmer disbanded The Decade in 2016.

In early 2016, Corino participated in the ROH Top Prospect Tournament. He competed in the first round on January 9, where he was eliminated by Punisher Martinez.

=== Various promotions (2016–2023) ===
On November 17, 2016, it was announced Corino would be joining the New Japan Pro-Wrestling Dojo to train as a young lion.

Corino formed the "Ugly Ducklings" stable with Lance Lude and Rob Killjoy.

In December 2016, Corino - alongside his Ugly Duckling stablemates - made a guest appearance in the Total Nonstop Action Wrestling (TNA) special Total Nonstop Deletion, as part of the Tag Team Apocalypto. He was quickly eliminated by Decay (Abyss and Crazzy Steve).

Corino appeared with WWE on the August 17, 2020 episode of RAW Underground, losing to Erik. He also appeared on the September 4 episode of 205 Live, losing to Mansoor.

=== National Wrestling Alliance (2023–present) ===
Corino made his return to the National Wrestling Alliance at night two of the Crockett Cup, accompanied by Jamie Stanley, defeating Eric Jackson, Flip Gordon, Gaagz the Gymp, Jarron Fulton, and Joe Alonzo to become the number one contender for the NWA World Junior Heavyweight Championship. On August 26 at night 1 of NWA 75th Anniversary Show, Corino won the NWA World Junior Heavyweight Championship. when he defeated Kerry Morton. On March 2, 2024 at Hard Times, Corino lost the NWA World Junior Heavyweight Championship to Joe Alonzo, ending his reign at 204 days.

At Hard Times V in March 2025, Colby defeated Frank in the final of the Jax Dane Memorial Tournament for a guaranteed shot at the NWA World Heavyweight Championship. Colby cashed in his title shot and got involved in the World Title match between Thom Latimer and Rhino, making it a triple threat match; the match was won by Latimer.

In January 2026, Corino signed a new multi-year deal with NWA.

== Championships and accomplishments ==
- America's Most Liked Wrestling
  - AML Prestige Championship (3 times)
- Atomic Championship Wrestling
  - ACW Cruiserweight Championship (1 time)
- Capitol Wrestling / Catalyst Wrestling
  - Capitol Wrestling Heavyweight Championship / Catalyst Wrestling Heavyweight Championship (1 time)
- H2O Wrestling: Hardcore Hustle Organization
  - H2O Heavyweight Championship (1 time)
- Juggalo Championship Wrestling
  - JCW Tag Team Championship (1 time) – with Shane Mercer
- Kross Fire Wrestling
  - KFW Championship (1 time)
- National Wrestling Alliance
  - NWA World Junior Heavyweight Championship (1 time)
  - Champions Series Tournament (2021) – with Trevor Murdoch, Jax Dane, Jennacide and The Masked Mystery Man
  - Cardona's Carnyland Gauntlet Battle Royal (2024)
  - NWA Worlds Heavyweight Title #1 Contendership Jax Dane Memorial Tournament (2025)
- Premier Wrestling Federation
  - PWF Junior Heavyweight Championship (3 times)
  - PWF Unified Tag Team Championship (2 times) – with Andrew Everett (1) and NINA (1)
  - PWF Crystal Coast Oceanic Championship (2 times)
  - Iron J Tournament (2014)
  - Lil' Sebastian Memorial Premier Tag League Tournament (2021) – with NINA
  - Oceanic XII Tournament (2021)
  - Most Popular Wrestler of the Year Award (2014)
  - Match of the Year Award (2015, 2021)
  - MVP Award (2020)
- Pro Wrestling Illustrated
  - Ranked No. 226 of the top 500 singles wrestlers in the PWI 500 in 2022
- Ring Wars Carolina
  - RWC Junior Heavyweight Championship (1 time)
- Vanguard Championship Wrestling
  - VCW Commonwealth Heritage Championship (2 times)
