= Primo and Epico =

Professional wrestling tag team

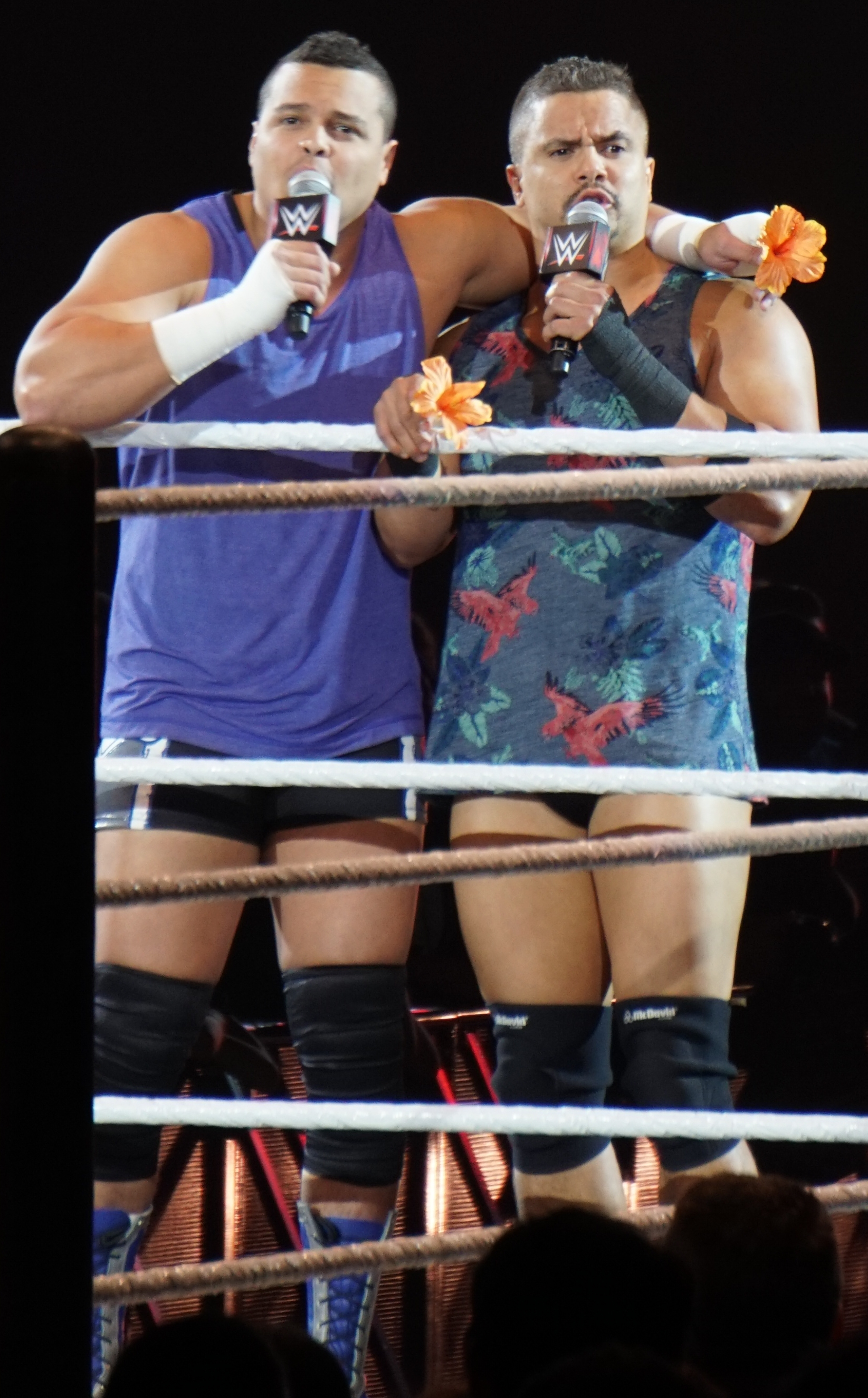
- Eddie (right) and Orlando (left) in 2016

Tag team
- Name(s): Los Matadores; Primo and Epico; The Shining Stars; The Colóns; The Colon Dynasty
- Members: Eddie Colón; Orlando Colón
- Billed heights: Primo: 5 ft 10 in (1.78 m); Epico: 6 ft 2 in (1.88 m)
- Combined billed weight: 440 lb (200 kg)
- Billed from: Plaza de Toros; San Juan, Puerto Rico
- Former members: A.W. (manager); El Torito (mascot); La Vaquita (mascot); Rosa Mendes (valet)
- Debut: 2007; November 11, 2011 (WWE)
- Years active: 2007–2008; 2011–2020; 2024–present

Eddie and Orlando Colón are a Puerto Rican professional wrestling tag team currently performing for the National Wrestling Alliance (NWA). The team, composed of real-life cousins, are former WWE Tag Team Champions

They previously competed as Primo and Epico in WWE from 2011 to 2013. They also formerly performed as Diego and Fernando, respectively, of Los Matadores from 2013 to 2015, and were billed as The Shining Stars from 2016 to 2017 before assuming their current tag team name of The Colóns.

== History ==
=== World Wrestling Council (2007–2008) ===
They teamed together for World Wrestling Council in Puerto Rico in 2007. Their first match together was on October 26, 2007 when they lost to Black Pain and Biggie Size. Their last match together was on January 6, 2008 when they defeated Konnan and Ron Killings. Primo would then sign with the WWE.

=== WWE (2011–2020) ===
==== Primo and Epico (2011–2013) ====
On the November 4, 2011, episode of SmackDown, Epico debuted on the main roster as a heel and realigned with Hunico, his former partner from when both were masked in FCW. On the November 11 episode of Smackdown, Primo, Epico's real-life cousin, was in the corner of Epico when he teamed with Hunico in a winning effort against The Usos. On the November 17 episode of Superstars, Primo and Epico beat the Usos. On the December 1 episode of Superstars, Rosa Mendes aligned herself with the group as their valet, as they were quietly disassociated from Hunico.

Primo and Epico then began a feud with WWE Tag Team Champions Air Boom, beating both Evan Bourne and Kofi Kingston in singles matches, followed by two victories for Primo and Epico against Air Boom during non-title tag team matches on December 13 at WWE Tribute to the Troops and the December 15 Superstars. This earned Primo and Epico a shot at the titles at TLC: Tables, Ladders & Chairs pay-per-view, but were unsuccessful. Primo and Epico's feud with Air Boom continued with Air Boom triumphant in singles matches, while Primo and Epico obtained yet another victory in a non-title tag match.

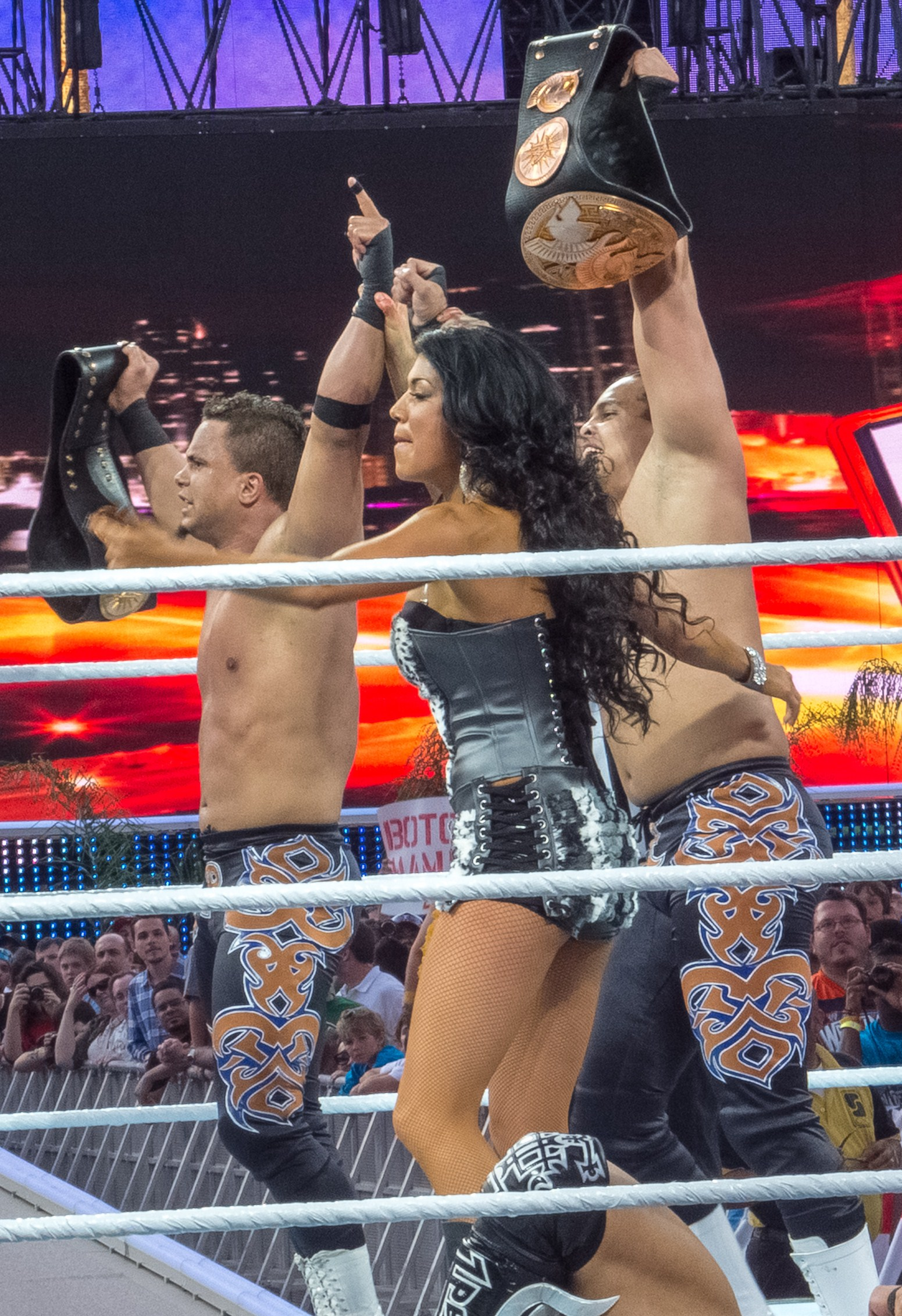
Primo and Epico with Rosa Mendes at WrestleMania XXVIII

At a Raw live event on January 15, 2012, Primo and Epico defeated Air Boom to win the WWE Tag Team Championship. The following night on Raw, Primo and Epico successfully defended their titles in a rematch. Primo and Epico would go on to earn victories in non-title matches, defeating various teams such as Jim Duggan and Santino Marella, Mason Ryan and Alex Riley and The Usos; however, Primo and Epico would suffer non-title losses against the team of Kofi Kingston and R-Truth. On the February 27 edition of Raw, Primo and Epico successfully defended their titles in a Triple Threat tag team match against the teams of Kingston and R-Truth & Dolph Ziggler and Jack Swagger. In the pre-show of WrestleMania XXVIII, Primo and Epico successfully defended their titles in a triple threat tag team match against the Usos and Justin Gabriel & Tyson Kidd. After WrestleMania, Primo and Epico suffered non-title losses to the teams of Big Show & The Great Khali and Santino Marella & Zack Ryder. Also, A.W. began offering his managerial services to the team, pointing out that the tag champions had been treated like jokes, being left off WrestleMania and Extreme Rules. At the April 30 Raw, Primo and Epico lost the tag titles to Kingston & R-Truth.

After losing the titles, Primo, Epico and Mendes joined A.W.'s talent agency in May. However, after joining "All World Promotions", Primo and Epico would not wrestle on television until the No Way Out pay-per-view on 17 June. At No Way Out, it was revealed that Primo and Epico's 30-day rematch clause for the tag titles had expired, and that the duo had to compete in a four-way match against the teams of Justin Gabriel & Tyson Kidd, the Usos and The Prime Time Players (Darren Young and Titus O'Neil) to earn another title shot. During the match, A. W. betrayed Primo and Epico, directly costing them the match and aligning with the match winners, the Prime Time Players. At the following Raw, Primo and Epico defeated the Players by count-out after O'Neil and Young walked out of the match. Primo and Epico would wrestle as babyfaces for their feud against the Prime Time Players. The tag teams would continue their feud on Superstars with Epico losing to Young and Primo beating both O'Neil and Young in singles matches. At Money in the Bank, Primo and Epico defeated the Prime Time Players. On the August 10 SmackDown, Primo and Epico faced the Players in a #1 contender match and were disqualified when champions Kingston & Truth attacked the Players; A.W. was released from WWE between that episode's taping and airing.

After Primo and Epico ended their feud with the Prime Time Players in August, they reverted to being heels during a victory over the Usos. Primo and Epico then went on to lose every televised match for the rest of 2012, with losses to Kingston & Truth, the Players, Rey Mysterio & Sin Cara, Team Co-Bro (Santino Marella & Zack Ryder), Team Rhodes Scholars, The Usos and to both Ryback and The Great Khali in handicap matches. At the Survivor Series pay-per-view, Primo and Epico took part in a 10 man elimination tag team match, but were eliminated by Rey Mysterio and Tyson Kidd. By the first SmackDown of 2013, Primo was on a 20 match losing streak, and Epico was at 17. On the January 9 NXT episode, Primo and Epico broke their losing streaks with a win over Bo Dallas and Michael McGillicutty, their first win in months. However, Dallas and McGillicutty gained revenge by defeating Primo and Epico in the first round of the NXT Tag Team Championship tournament to crown the inaugural champions.

==== Los Matadores (2013–2015) ====
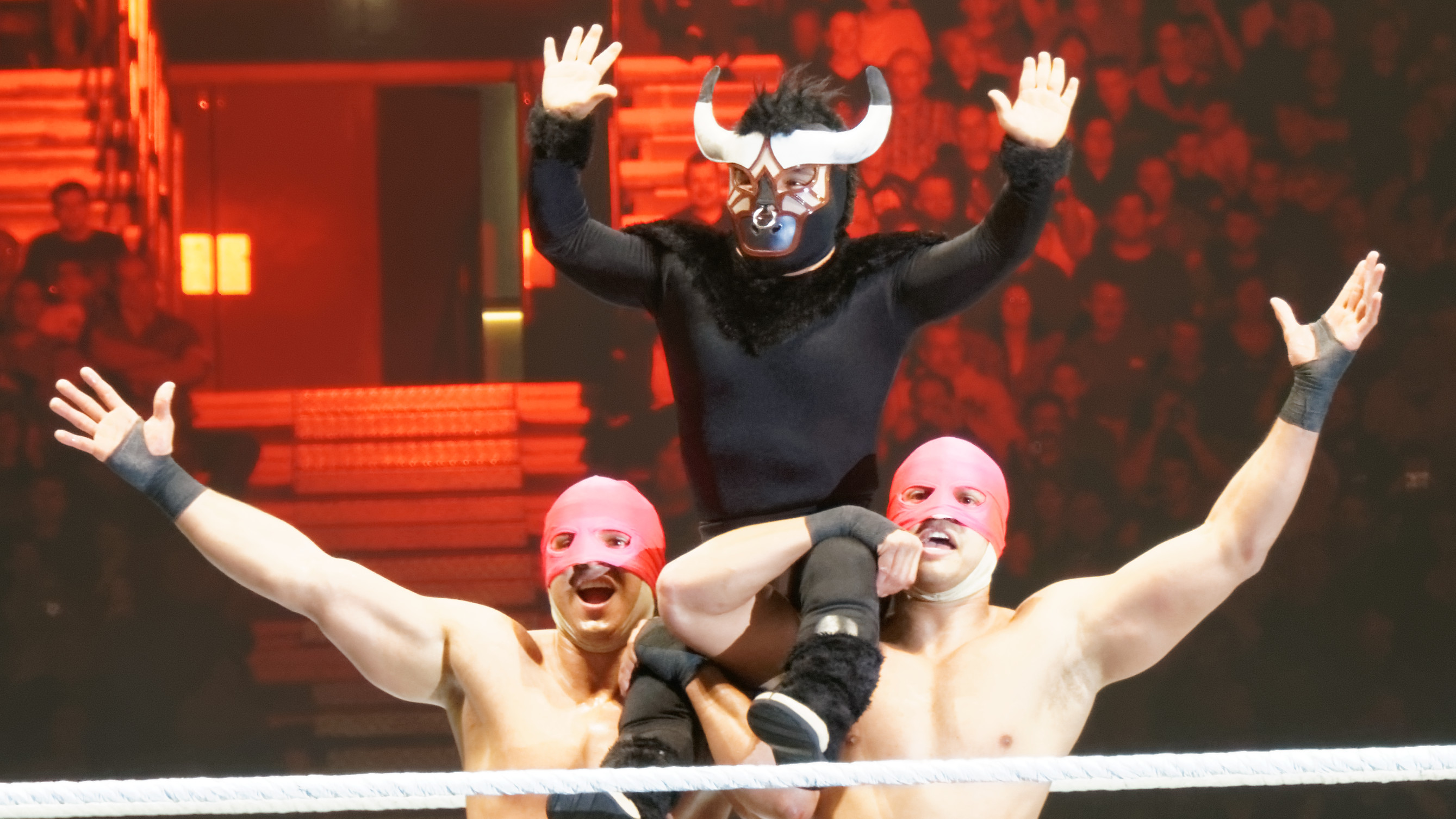
Los Matadores with El Torito in November 2013

In August 2013, WWE hyped the debut of "Los Matadores", and on the September 30 episode of Raw, Primo and Epico debuted new characters, as Diego and Fernando of Los Matadores, a face team of two masked Spanish bullfighters with El Torito as mascot as they defeated 3MB. Primo and Epico adopted their ring names from Diego Columbus and Ferdinand Columbus, the real life sons of Christopher Columbus (In Spanish, Cristobal Colón, Los Matadores' real last name). It was the start of a winning streak that featured nine wins over 3MB (Heath Slater, Drew McIntyre and Jinder Mahal, with El Torito wrestling in some matches), and also over the Real Americans (Antonio Cesaro and Jack Swagger) at Hell in a Cell. Also, El Torito was able to interfere in matches without incurring a disqualification for Los Matadores. Los Matadores' winning streak was finally snapped on the January 24 episode of SmackDown in 2014, courtesy of RybAxel (Ryback and Curtis Axel).

On the March 5 episode of Main Event, Los Matadores received a tag team championship match against The Usos in which they were defeated. They also made an appearance as Primo and Epico alongside Carlito to induct Carlos Colón into the WWE Hall of Fame class of 2014. At the WrestleMania XXX pre-show, they received a WWE Tag Team Championship shot against The Usos, RybAxel and The Real Americans, in a Fatal Four-Way Elimination Tag Team match, but lost after being the first team eliminated when Fernando submitted to Jack Swagger's Patriot Lock. On the June 23, WWE.com reported that Fernando was injured at a live event that past weekend. Despite this, Diego and El Torito would then start a short feud with Fandango.

After 3MB broke up, their former mascot Hornswoggle joined Los Matadores as "La Vaquita", a midget cow mascot accompanying Torito's bull on the August 19 edition of Main Event. Fernando made his return as well in a losing effort to Slater-Gator (Heath Slater and Titus O'Neil). At the WrestleMania 31 pre-show, Los Matadores competed in the Fatal Four Way tag team match, but they failed to win the titles. At Elimination Chamber, Los Matadores participated in the first-ever WWE Tag Team Championship Elimination Chamber, but failed and got eliminated first by The Ascension. At SummerSlam, Los Matadores competed in a Fatal 4-Way Tag Team Match for the WWE Tag Team Championship in a losing effort when they were pinned by The New Day. On September 7, 2015, episode of Raw after losing to The Dudley Boyz, Los Matadores turned heel when Diego attacked El Torito after the match, however he was then put through a table by the Dudley Boyz. They were last seen on Main Event that week, minus El Torito, where they lost to The Prime Time Players.

==== The Shining Stars (2016–2017) ====
From April to May 2016, several videos aired on Raw promoting the return of Primo and Epico, who revived their Puerto Rican gimmick under the new name The Shining Stars. They were presented as arrogant heels, urging viewers to come to Puerto Rico, calling it the "Shining Star of the Caribbean." On the May 16 episode of Raw, The Shining Stars debuted by defeating a local tag team in a squash match. On the July 25 episode of Raw, the team returned to television where they were defeated by Enzo and Cass. On the September 5 episode of Raw, The Shining Stars defeated Enzo and Cass. The week after, Epico, accompanied by Primo defeated Enzo Amore, who was accompanied by Big Cass. They then began showing tendencies of con men, trying to persuade various superstars to purchase timeshares to their Puerto Rican resort. This led to an alliance with Titus O'Neil, who was looking to cross-promote with them for his new "Titus Brand." The trio would enter a feud with The Golden Truth (Goldust and R-Truth) and Mark Henry. On the November 7 edition of Raw, after R-Truth sold The Golden Truth's Survivor Series spot for a stay at a timeshare to The Shining Stars, both teams competed to qualify for the 10–on–10 Survivor Series Tag Team Elimination match, which Primo and Epico won. On February 6, The New Day defeated The Shining Stars. On the February 27 edition of Raw, Big Show defeated The Shining Stars in a 2-on-1 handicap match. The Shining Stars were later defeated by The New Day on March 6. The Shining Stars were confirmed to enter the 2017 André the Giant Memorial battle royal at WrestleMania 33, however neither one of them were successful in winning.

==== The Colóns (2017–2020) ====
On April 11, leaving the Shining Stars moniker behind for a new look, The Colóns, as they were now billed, debuted on SmackDown Live during the Superstar Shake-up, when they attacked American Alpha following their loss to The Usos. On April 18, The Colóns defeated American Alpha. On April 25, The Colóns were defeated by American Alpha in a "Beat The Clock" Challenge. On June 18, The Colóns were defeated by The Hype Bros in a Money in the Bank Kickoff match. In June, Primo suffered a knee injury, putting the team on a temporary hiatus. The team returned in November, two nights after Survivor Series, where they were among the many lumberjacks in The New Day's match against Kevin Owens and Sami Zayn. On the August 28, 2018 episode of SmackDown Live, The Colóns returned in a triple threat match involving The Bar & Luke Gallows and Karl Anderson, with a victory for The Bar.

During the pre-show of 2018's Survivor Series, Primo and Epico won the 10-on-10 Survivor Series tag team elimination match as part of Team SmackDown's tag teams Their most recent WWE match was a January 2019 dark match. Since then they have been wrestling in World Wrestling Council, helping their father/uncle with a rebranding of the promotion.

On April 15, 2020, The Colóns were officially released from their WWE contracts due to budget cuts stemming from the COVID-19 pandemic.

=== Independent circuit (2020) ===
After being released from WWE, The Colons worked in the independent circuit. They won the CCW Tag Team titles, defeating Bugs Moran and Will Austin in Fort Lauderdale, Florida on June 20, 2020. Their last match together was on November 28, 2020 in a tables match losing to Cinta de Oro & Magno in El Paso, Texas for AEMG. They both went their separate ways with Epico returning to Puerto Rico and Primo returning to Puerto Rico and working in Mexico.

=== Return to Independent circuit and Mexico (2023-present) ===
On July 29, 2023, The Colons reunited when they lost to D3 and Romeo Quevedo at NGCW Lucha Conquest 9 in Kissimmee, Florida. On March 10, 2024, they defeated Josh Wise and Nick Bundy for NRG Wrestling in Fort Myers, Florida. On September 22, 2024 they defeated Magno and Rafaga Jr. for Tercer Festival De Lucha Libre JRZ in Chihuahua, Mexico.

In November 2025, they wrestled three matches for FULL (Federacion Universal De Lucha Libre) in Mexico reuniting with Carlito.

=== NWA Powerrr (2024-present) ===
The Colons made their debut for NWA Powerrr based in Tampa, Florida on October 5, 2024 when they defeated The Rewind Society (Samuel C and VHS). The next night they lost to The Immortals (Kratos and Odinson) bu disqualification. This would go into a feud with The Immortals. On May 17, 2025, they participated in the Crockett Cup tournament, defeating Daisy Kill and Talos in the first round and The Holy Grail (EC3 and Pretty Boy Smooth) in the semi-final. They lost to the Immortals in the Finals.

They participated Crockett Cup 2026 tournament when they defeated Red White And JAC'd (JAC & Wrecking Ball Legursky) in the first round on February 21. Then they lost to The Country Gentlemen (AJ Cazana and KC Cazana) in the quarter final on April 4.

=== TNA Wrestling (2025) ===
The Colóns made a surprise appearance on TNA iMPACT! on February 20, 2025, interrupting Joe Hendry's performance. The Colóns were then interrupted by a debuting Elijah and this led to a match between both teams in which Hendry and Elijah came out as victorious. The next night they lost to the Hardy Boyz. Their last match was on March 15, 2025 when they lost to the Hardy Boyz in an El Paso Street Fight.

=== Ring of Honor (2026–present) ===
On the March 12, 2026 episode of Ring of Honor Wrestling, The Colóns Made their ROH debut, unsuccessfully challenging Sammy Guevara and The Beast Mortos for the ROH World Tag Team Championships.

== Championships and accomplishments ==
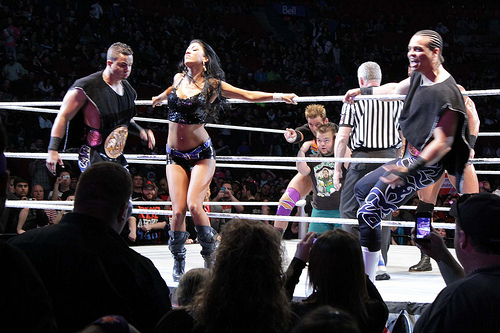
Primo and Epico as WWE Tag Team Champions

- Coastal Championship Wrestling
  - CCW Tag Team Championship (1 time)
- Pro Wrestling Illustrated
  - PWI ranked Primo #72 of the top 500 singles wrestlers in the PWI 500 in 2012
  - PWI ranked Epico #76 of the top 500 singles wrestlers in the PWI 500 in 2012
- WWE
  - WWE Tag Team Championship (1 time)

== See also ==
- The Colóns (2002–2010)
