= Odinson (wrestler) =

American male professional wrestler

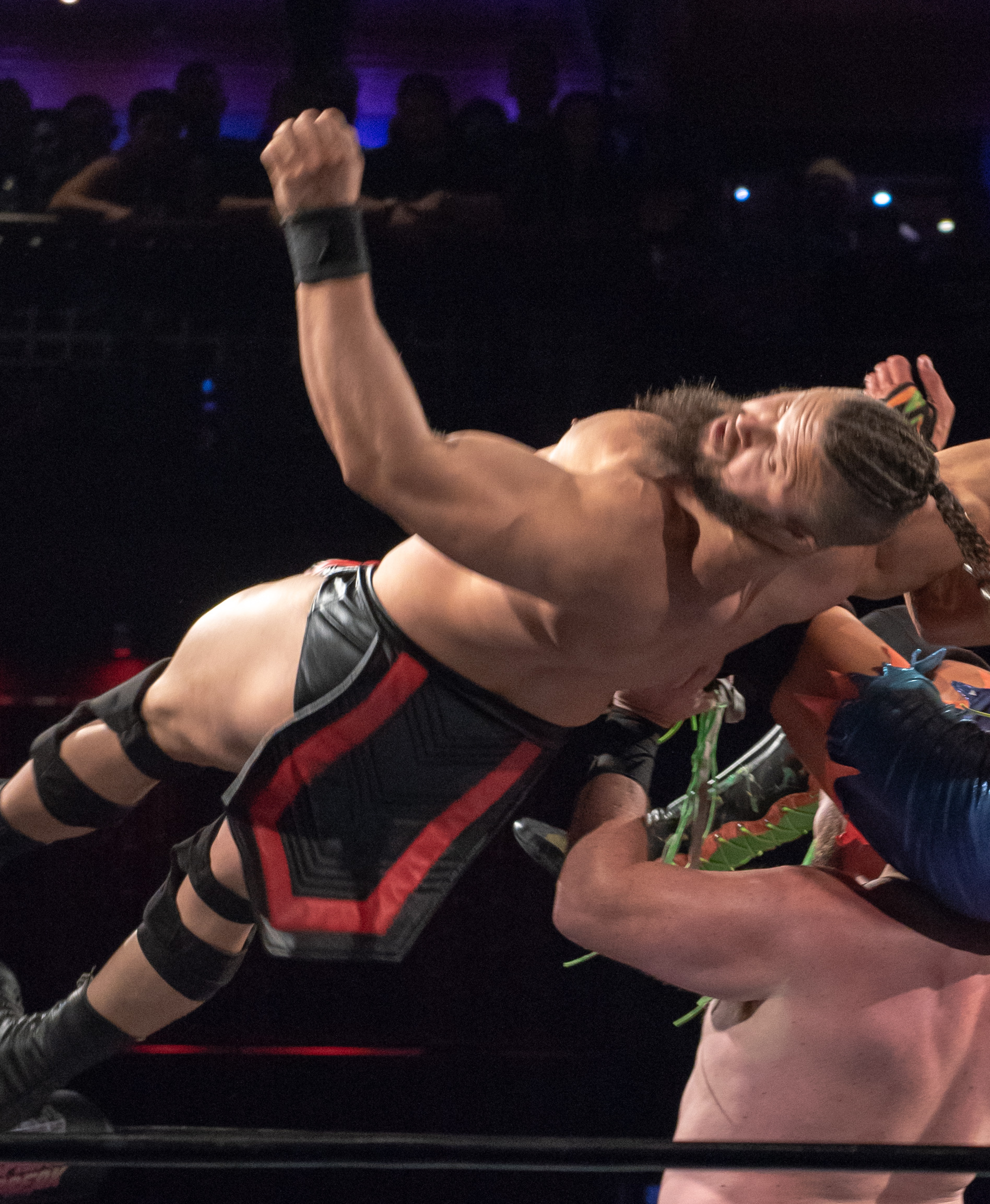
- Odinson in April 2019

Personal information
- Born: Georgia, United States

Professional wrestling career
- Ring name: Odinson
- Billed height: 194 cm (6 ft 4 in)
- Billed weight: 128 kg (282 lb)
- Trained by: Curtis Hughes
- Debut: 2014

Reginald Gibbs better known by his ring name Odinson is an American professional wrestler signed to National Wrestling Alliance (NWA) where he is former one-time NWA World Tag Team Champion. He also competed in other promotions from the American and Japanese independent scenes.

== Professional wrestling career ==
=== American independent circuit (2014–2021) ===
Gibbs made his professional wrestling debut at a house show promoted by World Wrestling Alliance 4 (WWA4) on January 2, 2014, where he defeated Axel Ross in singles competition. He is known for his tenures with various promotions from the American independent scene such as Full Impact Pro (FIP), Southern Fried Championship Wrestling (SFCW) and others.

In Game Changer Wrestling, Gibbs debuted in the Joey Janela's Spring Break series of events as part of Spring Break 3 on April 7, 2019, where he competed in the traditional Clusterfuck Battle Royal, a bout that ended in a no contest and involved notable opponents such as Joey Ryan, JTG, nWo Sting, Swoggle and others.

=== All Japan Pro Wrestling (2018–2019; 2024) ===
Gibbs spent a two-year tenure with All Japan Pro Wrestling alongside "The End" tag team partner Parrow as foreign talents. They competed in one of the promotion's signature events, the World's Strongest Tag Determination League, having made their first appearance at the 2018 edition where they scored a total of twelve points after competing against the teams of Joe Doering and Dylan James, Jun Akiyama and Daisuke Sekimoto, Kai and Kengo Mashimo, Shuji Ishikawa and Suwama, Kento Miyahara and Yoshitatsu, Takao Omori and Manabu Soya, Zeus and The Bodyguard, Jake Lee and Ryoji Sai, Yuma Aoyagi and Naoya Nomura, Tajiri and Gianni Valletta. Gibbs and Parrow also made an appearance one year later at the 2019 edition where they scored only eight points.

On the seventh night of the AJPW Dynamite Series 2019 from June 30, Gibbs and Parrow unsuccessfully challenged Violent Giants (Shuji Ishikawa and Suwama) for the AJPW World Tag Team Championship. They made a brief return to the promotion in 2024 at AJPW Super Power Series, unsuccessfully challenging Saito Brothers (Jun and Rei Saito) for the tag titles.

=== National Wrestling Alliance (2021–present) ===
Gibbs debuted in the National Wrestling Alliance at NWA Powerrr #70 April 6, 2021, where he teamed up with tag team partner Parrow in a losing effort against Strictly Business (Chris Adonis and Thom Latimer) in tag team competition.

During his time with the promotion, he chased various accomplishments. On the first night of the NWA 75th Anniversary Show from August 26, 2023, he unsuccessfully challenged "Thrillbilly" Silas Mason and J. R. Kratos in a three-way match disputed for the vacant NWA National Heavyweight Championship. At NWA Samhain on October 28, 2023, he won the NWA United States Tag Team Championship alongside J. R. Kratos by defeating Daisy Kill and Talos. They relinquished the titles at Hard Times 4 on April 2, 2024, in order to challenge for the NWA World Tag Team Championship. At NWA 77th Anniversary Show on August 16, 2025, he won the NWA World Tag Team Championship alongside J. R. Kratos by defeating Knox and Murdoch.

He made his first pay-per-view appearance at NWA When Our Shadows Fall on June 6, 2021, where he teamed up with Parrow in a losing effort against La Rebelión (Mecha Wolf and Bestia 666), Slice Boogie and Marshe Rockett, and Sal Rinauro and Sam Rudo in a four-way tag team match. At NWA Hard Times 2 on December 4, 2021, he and Parrow unsuccessfully challenged Wolf and Bestia for the NWA World Tag Team Championship.

Gibbs competed in several of the promotion's signature events. In the Crockett Cup, he made his first appearance at the 2022 edition where he teamed up with Parrow and fell short to Hawx Aerie (Luke Hawx and PJ Hawx) in the first rounds. He scored his best result at the 2025 edition of the tournament which he won alonsgide J. R. Kratos as "The Immotrals" by defeating The Slimeballz (Sage Chantz and Tommy Rant) in the quarterfinals, Knox and Murdoch in the semifinals, and The Colóns (Eddie Colón and Orlando Colón) in the finals.

== Championships and accomplishments ==
- Elite Championship Wrestling
  - ECW Heavyweight Championship (1 time)
- Full Impact Pro
  - FIP World Tag Team Championship (1 time) – with Parrow
- National Wrestling Alliance
  - NWA Georgia Heavyweight Championship (1 time)
  - NWA World Tag Team Championship (1 time) – with J. R. Kratos
  - NWA United States Tag Team Championship (1 time) – with J. R. Kratos
  - Crockett Cup (2025) – with J. R. Kratos
- New South Pro Wrestling
  - New South Championship (1 time)
  - New South Tag Team Championship (1 time) – with Parrow
- Pro Wrestling Illustrated
  - Ranked No. 358 of the top 500 singles wrestlers in the PWI 500 in 2021
- Southern Fried Championship Wrestling
  - SFCW Heavyweight Championship (1 time)
  - SFCW Tag Team Championship (1 time) – with Logan Creed
