= Mikael Judas =

American professional wrestler

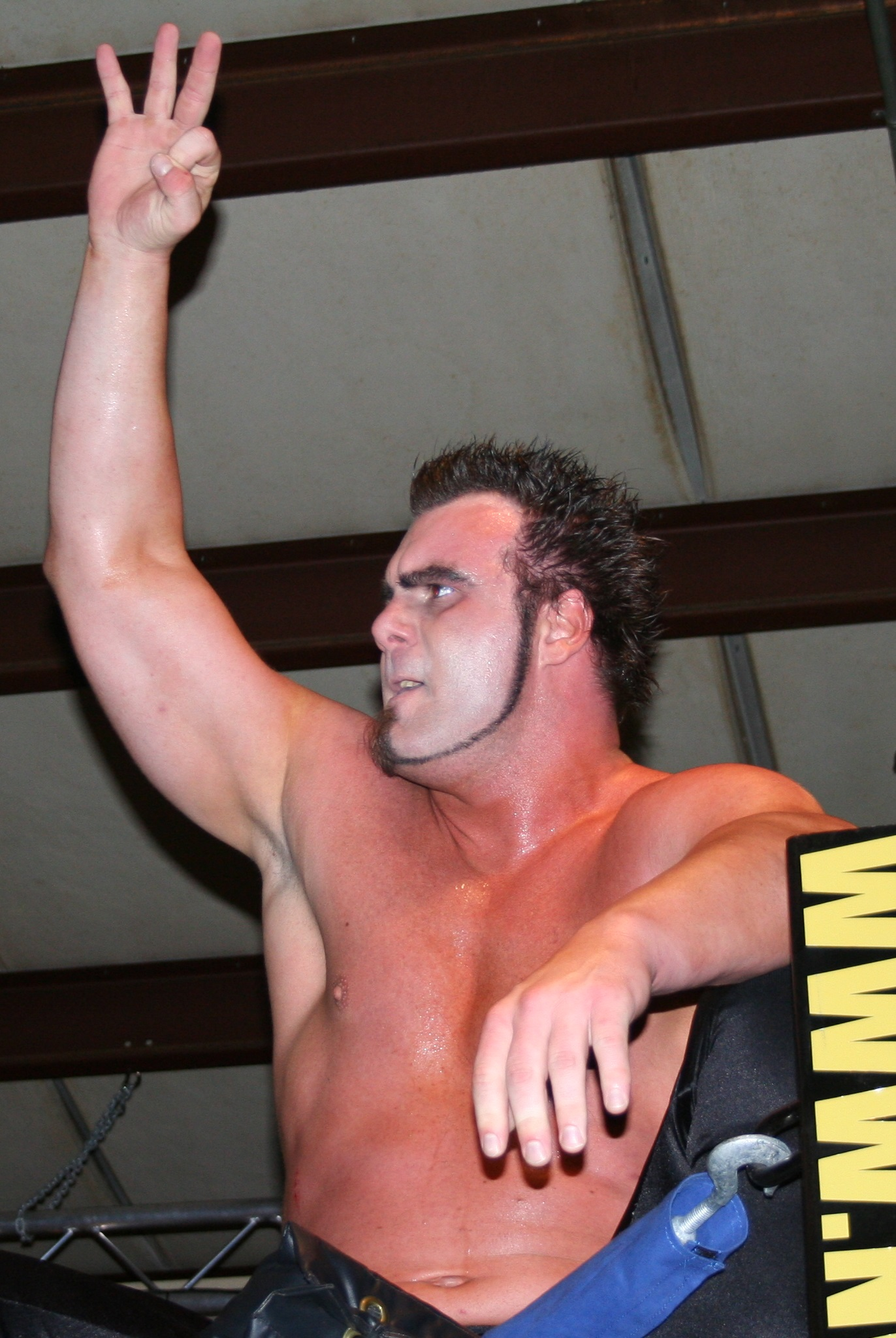
- Judas in 2009

Personal information
- Born: Michael Cole

Professional wrestling career
- Ring name(s): Judais; Mikael Adryan; Mikael Judás; Murphy; Frank
- Billed height: 6 ft 4 in (1.93 m)
- Billed weight: 272 lb (123 kg)
- Billed from: "The Heart of Darkness"; Charlotte, North Carolina, U.S.
- Trained by: Brodie Chase; Mikki Free
- Debut: June 1999

Michael Cole is an American professional wrestler, He is signed to the National Wrestling Alliance (NWA). He is best known for his time in Total Nonstop Action Wrestling (TNA) under the ring name Murphy. He has also wrestled under the ring names Judais, Judas, Mikael Judás and Frank.

== Professional wrestling career ==
Mikael Judas debuted in June 1999 and began working for many independent promotions located in the southeast United States.

=== National Wrestling Alliance (2002–2011) ===
Mikael Judas became a part of NWA Wildside as the 1 Man Mafia Mikal Adryan in May 2002 as part of The Elite Swingers.

In June 2003 that group disbanded and he and Murder 1 became The Dark City Soldiers in June 2003. December 2003 Jeff G. Bailey offered Judas a chance to be a part of the NWA ELITE with Rainman, Azreal and Jason Cross.

NWA Wildside shut down in April 2005 being replaced by NWA Anarchy.

Judas has had dark matches with both WWE and TNA.

After the death of NWA Wildside, Judas became a top star with NWA Anarchy, including winning the NWA Anarchy Heavyweight Championship at Hostile Environment in 2005. Judas is the two-time NWA Anarchy Heavyweight Champion, having defeated former champ, Shadow Jackson and was managed by Mr. Cid Istic Esq. He lost the title to Tank on January 8, 2011, ending his reign of 252 days.

=== International Wrestling Alliance Puerto Rico (2005–2007) ===
Debuted in June 2005 as the monster managed by Savio Vega. In July he would defeat Lightning to with the IWA Heavyweight Championship and hold this title for 6 months, losing to Chicano at Historia Boriqua. He would go on to feud with Bison, Savio Vega, Ricky Banderas and The Glamour Boy Shane. Judas would win the Heavyweight Championship one more time before leaving the company.

=== Total Nonstop Action Wrestling (2010–2011) ===
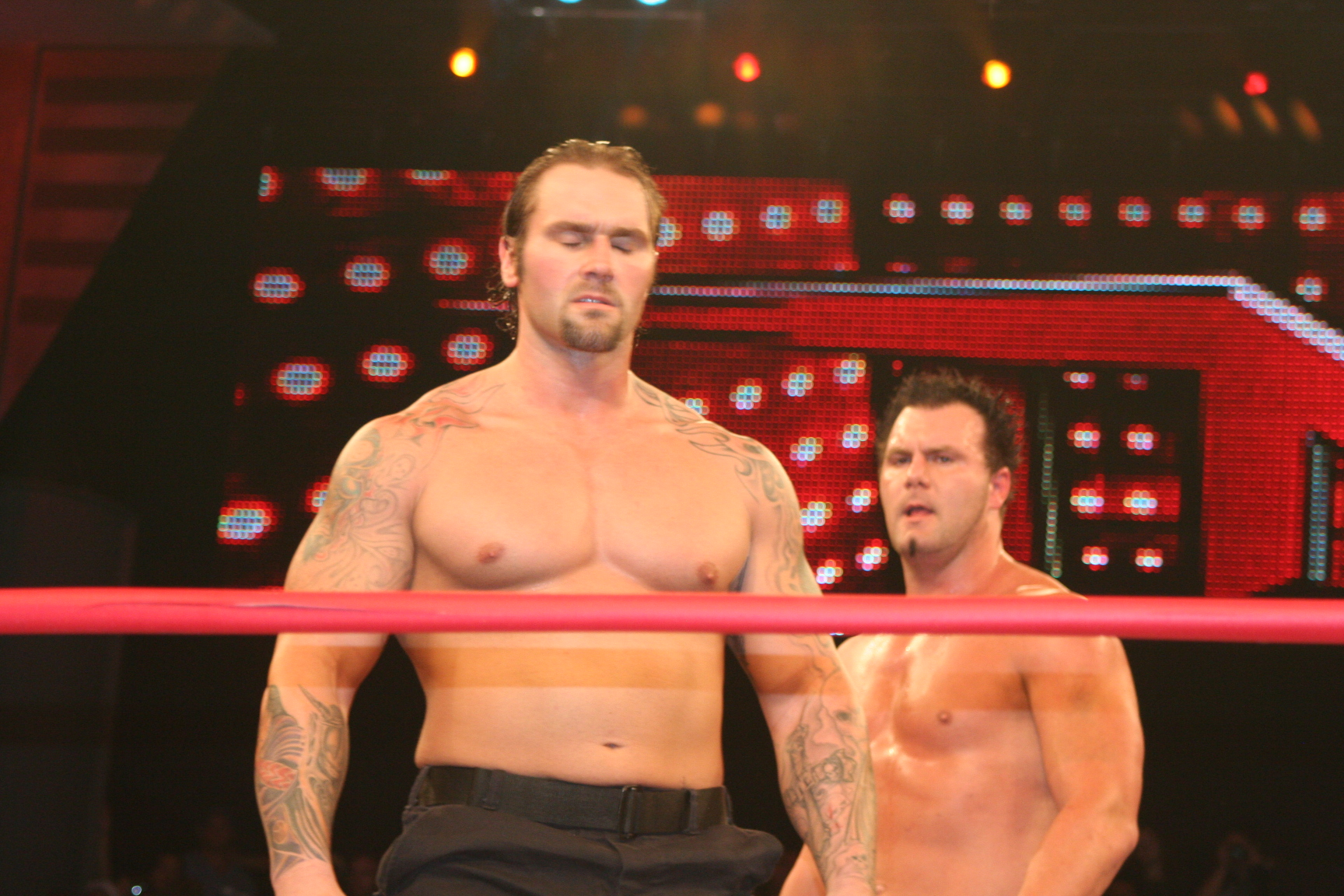
(Left to right) Gunner and Murphy on TNA Impact! in July 2010

On the June 23, 2010, tapings of Total Nonstop Action Wrestling's Impact! television show, Judas made his debut along with fellow worker Phill Shatter as TNA's on-air security. This was considered an extended tryout for the two, and may lead to "something bigger" down the line. On the July 29, 2010, edition of TNA Impact! taping, Judas, now using the name Murphy, and Shatter, using the name Gunner, came out after an altercation involving Jeff Hardy and Mr. Anderson with Matt Morgan, and attacked Hardy and Anderson, thus turning heel. They then teamed with Morgan in a handicap match, where they were defeated by Hardy and Anderson. They spent several weeks as a tag team and became regular members of the Immortal stable. On February 13, 2011, at Against All Odds, Gunner and Murphy wrestled their first TNA PPV match, a six-man tag team match, where they teamed with their Immortal stablemate Rob Terry in a losing effort against James Storm, Robert Roode and Scott Steiner. In February both Gunner and Murphy signed two–year contracts with TNA, which saw them moved from their roles as just security guards into the active roster. On the February 24 edition of Impact!, Gunner and Murphy defeated Eric Young and Orlando Jordan to earn their first shot at the TNA World Tag Team Championship, held by Beer Money, Inc. (James Storm and Robert Roode). They would receive their shot at the title on the following edition of Impact!, but were defeated by Beer Money, Inc. On the March 17 edition of Impact!, Murphy would wrestle in a three–way dance for the vacant TNA Television Championship against Gunner and Rob Terry. Gunner would go on to win the match and the title. While Gunner went on to defend his newly won title, Murphy formed a new partnership with Terry and together the two of them went on to unsuccessfully challenge Beer Money, Inc. for the TNA World Tag Team Championship in a steel cage match on the April 21 edition of Impact!. On the May 5 edition of Impact!, Murphy was kicked out of Immortal after losing a "Loser Leaves Immortal" match against Rob Terry. Murphy was not seen on any TNA programming following the match against Terry, and his profile on TNA's roster page was removed on October 13, 2011, confirming that he had been released from the promotion.

=== Return to NWA (2021–present) ===
Managed by "The Sinister Minister" James Mitchell, Judais would make his return as the 13th contender in the NWA National Heavyweight Championship #1 Contender Battle Royal at NWA 73rd Anniversary Show in St. Louis, Missouri. Judais cashed in his shot against Chris Adonis at Hard Times 2. He would injure his knee on a top rope clothesline allowing Adonis to apply The Masterlock. Judais would pass out from the pain losing the match.

In the following weeks, Mitchell and Judais began to recruit "followers" into their stable, The Miserably Faithful". They started with Sal Rinauro. Later they would add Gags The Gimp and Max the Impaler.

== Championships and accomplishments ==
- Anarchy Wrestling
  - NWA Wildside Tag Team Championship (1 time) – with Azrael
  - NWA Anarchy Heavyweight Championship (3 times)
  - NWA Anarchy Tag Team Championship (2 times) - with Tank, Shaun Tempers (2) and Azrael (1)
  - NWA Wildside Future Star (2004)
- Battlezone Wrestling
  - BZW Heavyweight Championship (1 time)
- Champions With Attitude
  - CWA Heavyweight Championship (1 time)
- DragonCon Wrestling
  - DCW Dragon Cup Championship (1 time)
- International Wrestling Association
  - IWA World Heavyweight Championship (2 times)
- Mid Atlantic Xteme Wrestling
  - MAXW Tag Team Championship (3 times) - with Maxx Mayhem
  - UWF Tag Team Championship (5 times) - with Vincent I Pain
  - UWF Heavyweight Championship (3 times)
- Pro Wrestling Evolution
  - PWE Heavyweight Championship (1 time)
- Pro Wrestling Illustrated
  - PWI ranked him # 153 of the 500 best singles wrestlers of the PWI 500 in 2010
- Southern Fried Championship Wrestling
  - SFCW Heavyweight Championship (5 times)
- Southern Honor Wrestling
  - SHW Championship (1 time)
  - SHW Tag Team Championship (1 time) - with Corey Hollis
- Wrestlemerica
  - Wrestlemerica Heavyweight Championship (1 time)
  - Wrestlemerica Bulletproof Championship (1 time)
- National Wrestling Alliance
  - Winner of NWA National Heavyweight Championship #1 Contender Battle Royal
