= Epico Colón =

Puerto Rican wrestler (born 1982)

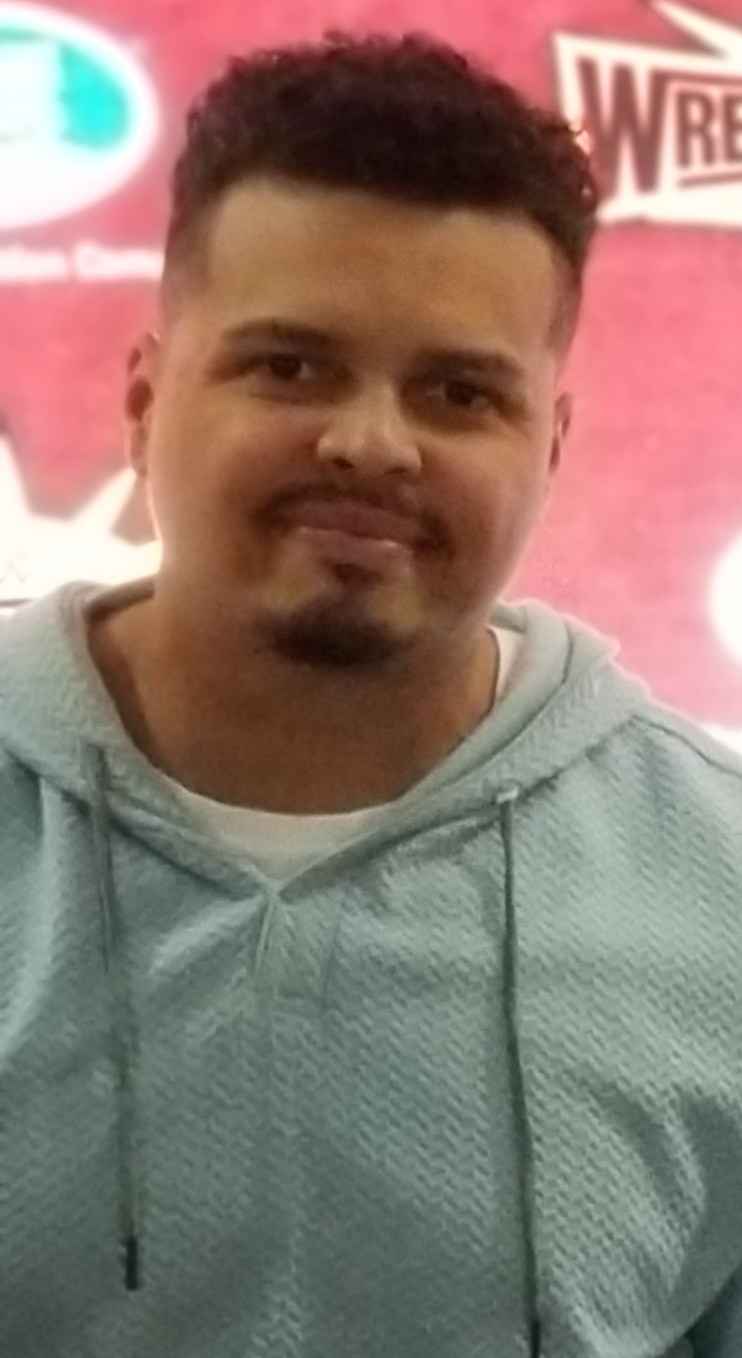
- Colón in 2019

Personal information
- Born: Orlando Tito Colón Nieves; March 24, 1982 (age 44) San Juan, Puerto Rico
- Education: Western Michigan University
- Relatives: Carlos Colón Sr. (uncle); Carlito (cousin); Primo Colón (cousin)

Professional wrestling career
- Ring name(s): Dos Equis; Dynamico; Epico; Epico Colon; Fernando; Fire Blaze; Orlando Colón; Tito Colon; Tito Nieves
- Billed height: 6 ft 0 in (1.83 m)
- Billed weight: 230 lb (100 kg)
- Billed from: San Juan, Puerto Rico; Plaza de Toros
- Trained by: Carlos Colón Sr. Dan Severn
- Debut: 2004

Orlando Tito Colón Nieves (born March 24, 1982) is a Puerto Rican professional wrestler. He is signed to World Wrestling Council (WWC), where he performs as Orlando Colón where is the Director of Operations. He is also makes appearances on the independent circuit. He is best known for his tenure in WWE, where he performed under the ring name Epico Colón.

== Early life ==
Orlando Tito Colón Nieves was born on March 24, 1982, in San Juan, Puerto Rico. He attended Western Michigan University, where he played baseball for the Western Michigan Broncos. He graduated with a bachelor's degree in accounting.

== Professional wrestling career ==
=== Early career (2004–2006) ===
Colón began his training at Dan "The Beast" Severn's, Michigan Sports Camps and competing in Price of Glory Wrestling (Coldwater, MI) in 2004. Colón began wrestling in the independent circuit of the United States, performing in Hybrid Pro Wrestling, a promotion based in Schoolcraft, Michigan. He was given a villainous persona, which noted his lineage as a member of the Colón family, as well as a gimmick of "winning by any means necessary", emphasizing his heel character. It was in this promotion that he first used his finisher move, a swinging half nelson with leg capture dubbed "Orlando's Magic". Concurrently, he worked three dates for Price Of Glory Wrestling and eight for Independent Wrestling Association Mid-South. Colón participated in the tournament to crown the first Hybrid Pro Wrestling Champion. In the first round, he was booked against CJ Otis, being eliminated after losing the contest by pinfall due to interference. Subsequently, Colón created a tag team with independent wrestler Jack Thriller, from Honolulu, Hawaii. The team began a feud with Jayson Quick and Josh Abercrombie, which was scheduled to conclude at a special event titled Phase: One. However, Colón was included in an angle where he provoked Quick, engaging in a public fight. As part of the storyline, Colón and Quick were banned from participating at Phase: One by the HPW Championship Committee. He was said to be cleared to return, but as part of the angle Colón refused to wrestle in the promotion until the company compensated him. This storyline was used to explain Colón's departure from the company due to moving back to Puerto Rico.

=== World Wrestling Council (2006–2011) ===
In 2006, Colón joined the World Wrestling Council, a promotion owned by his uncle, Carlos Colón, Sr. He debuted as the mystery opponent in a stipulation match that promoted the debut of "another member of the Colón family". Shortly afterwards, he made his return to the company under a masked gimmick named "Fireblaze". Under this ring name he won his first title in the promotion, the WWC Puerto Rico Heavyweight Championship, being booked to defeat "El Bronco" Ramón Álvarez. During the following six months, Colón dropped and recovered the title twice, before dropping it a final time on March 24, 2007. He continued using the pseudonym and was included in a feud with Bronco. The storyline concluded at Aniversario 2007, where he dropped a retirement & mask vs. retirement match between them, revealing his identity. During the first half of 2008, WWC organized a tournament for the vacant WWC Universal Heavyweight Championship. The event presented a purported points system, in which Colón gained an early and decisive lead. Concurrent to this tournament, he entered in a feud with El Condor, a masked character played by Ray González. After defeating El Condor one week before Honor vs. Traicion, a stipulation match was scheduled for that event, in which El Condor would receive the same number of points held by Colón. At the event, Colón was booked to lose the match. The angle between both wrestlers continued, before serving as a transition to a feud between an unmasked González and the other members of the Colón family. Subsequently, Colón continued his involvement in the tournament, entering a feud with the second seed, Noriega. The finals were held at Aniversario 2008, with Noriega defeating Colón to win the Universal Heavyweight Championship. He continued performing in contests against both González and Noriega, who assaulted him in a backstage segment. After Noriega abandoned the company, Colón moved on to feud with González, exchanging victories with him. On September 6, 2008, Colón defeated Steve Corino. Following this, Colón suffered an injury that kept him out of being booked in matches, while participating in backstage segments.

In December 2008, Colón appeared in a spot where he signed a legal document that allowed El Bronco to return to the promotion, in order to fight against González, who had now received a face persona. At Euphoria 2009, Colón returned as a masked heel wrestler, subsequently introduced as La Pesadilla, attacking González. Meanwhile, he also continued performing backstage as a face under his former character. The angle continued, with La Pesadilla performing multiple attacks and interventions against González, who offered a ransom of $5,000 for the wrestler's identity and contracted a private investigator. As a result of this, two more masked wrestlers began serving as bodyguards. La Pesadilla's in-ring debut took place at Camino a la Gloria 2009, where he defeated Shane Sewell. On that same night, Colón wrestled under his face character, performing against Bronco. The match was won by Bronco, after González entered dressed as La Pesadilla and interrupted the action. After the contest, González gave Colón the mask, revealing him as the wrestler responsible for the attacks against him. The feud peaked at the promotion's top annual event, Aniversario 2009. Here Colón was booked to lose against González in a contest that featured Félix Trinidad as the guest referee, dropping the mask and adopting the pseudonym Orlando "La Pesadilla" Colón. After this event, Colón formed a heel stable with Hiram Tua Mulero, subsequently including Eric Pérez. As the leader, he continued feuds with González and the company's face faction. While leading the group, Colón won his fifth Puerto Rico Heavyweight Championship, being placed over Shane Sewell on September 26, 2009. After WWC closed its 2009 season, he participated in a tryout for World Wrestling Entertainment (WWE) held in December, signing a developmental contract immediately after concluding his performance. In the first event of 2010, Euphoria, Colón was placed over his cousin and WWE wrestler, Eddie Colón. During the following months, the stable was systematically dismantled, Mulero received a gimmick change and returned as an unrelated masked wrestler, while Pérez left WWC to work for Combat Championship Wrestling and American Combat Wrestling. Ultimately, Colón dropped the Puerto Rico Heavyweight Championship and left the promotion to join Florida Championship Wrestling. At Aniversario 2010, he was booked to win his sixth WWC Puerto Rico Heavyweight Championship, which he went on to lose to Carlitos on September 25, 2010. At Septiembre Negro 2011, he won his first WWC Caribbean Heavyweight Championship over Chavo Guerrero. In his last days with the company, Colón had a minor role as a booker.

=== Pro Wrestling Zero1 (2009) ===
On March 4, 2009, Pro Wrestling Zero1 based in Japan, announced that Colón would debut in the company. His inclusion was as part of a heel faction named "Premium Wrestling Federation" or P.W.F., led by Steve Corino, which was "invading" the company. In his debut, he was teamed with Sonjay Dutt to perform against Shinjiro Otani and Ikuto Hidaka. The P.W.F. won this match-up at the 15:09 mark, when Colón utilized his finisher move, Orlando's Magic, on Hidaka to score a pinfall. Subsequently, all members of the P.W.F. participated in a sketch that involved invading the residence of several young Pro Wrestling Zero1 performers. In only his second appearance within the promotion, Colón was booked in a championship contest against Shinjiro Otani, for the World Heavyweight Championship. The match-up was won by Otani, who utilized his finisher, the Spiral Bomb, to score a pinfall. Meanwhile, the WWC promoted his participation in Japan as a "test tryout". The company avoided mentioning Colón's heel character in Pro Wrestling Zero1, and continued booking him as a face until Camino a la Gloria 2009.

=== WWE (2010–2020) ===
==== Florida Championship Wrestling (2010–2011) ====
Colón debuted on March 11, 2010, teaming with Johnny Prime and Incognito and being booked to defeat Tyler Reks, Derrick Bateman and Vance Archer.The promotion's creative team gave him a new ring name "Tito Nieves", which was quickly changed to "Tito Colon". Subsequently, his character was revamped as a masked wrestler called "Dos Equis" (After the Dos Equis beer), while Incognito was renamed Hunico and their team was named Los Aviadores (Spanish for "The Aviators") On June 3, 2010 Los Aviadores defeated the Uso Brothers to win the Florida Tag Team Championship. Shortly after, his character was renamed again, now being known as "Dynamico" and then "Epico". On July 15 Los Aviadores lost the tag team titles to Kaval and Michael McGillicutty, but regained the titles the following day in a rematch. On August 12, 2010, Epico and Hunico lost the tag team championship to Johnny Curtis and Derrick Bateman in a three-way match, also involving the team of Donny Marlow and Brodus Clay. Following this, his gimmick was changed back to Tito Colon. In mid-2011, he joined a stable known as The Ascension or La Ascención led by Ricardo Rodriguez, which also consists of Conor O'Brian, Kenneth Cameron, and Raquel Diaz.

==== Teaming with Primo (2011–2020) ====
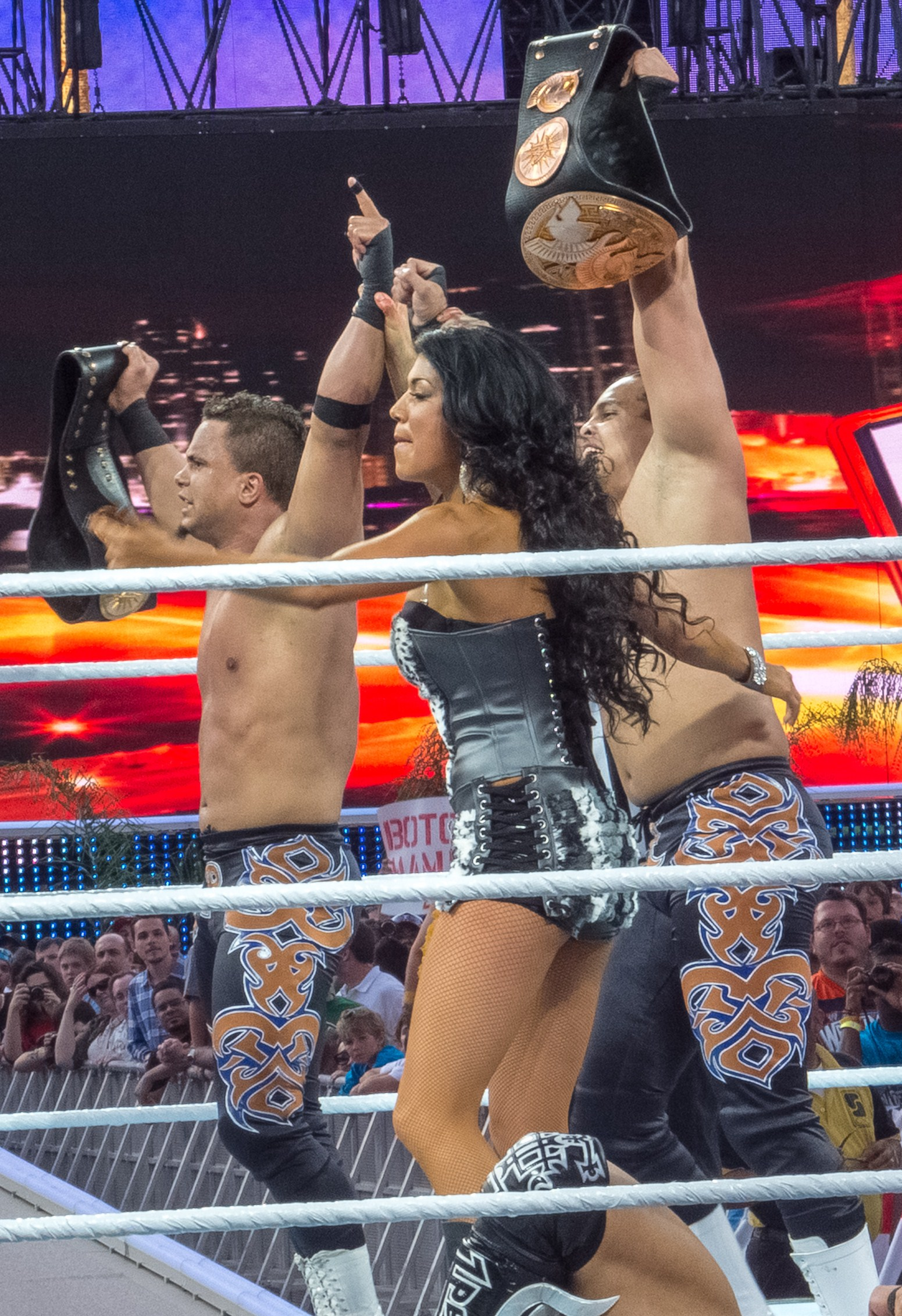
Epico (right) and Primo (left) as the WWE Tag Team Champions, accompanied by Rosa Mendes (center)

On the November 4 episode of SmackDown, Colón made his debut on the main roster as a heel, under the Epico name but without the mask, losing to Sin Cara by disqualification after interference by his Los Aviadores tag team partner Hunico, who Sin Cara had recently unmasked. The following week, Epico and Hunico teamed up in a winning effort against the Usos, with Epico's cousin Primo in Los Aviadores' corner. Epico then began teaming with Primo, with Rosa Mendes as their manager, where they defeated The Usos on the November 17 episode of WWE Superstars. They then began a feud with WWE Tag Team Champions Air Boom (Evan Bourne and Kofi Kingston), defeating them in tag team and singles matches. On December 18 at TLC: Tables, Ladders & Chairs, Epico and Primo failed to capture the WWE Tag Team Championships from Air Boom. Their feud with Air Boom continued in singles and non-title matches, with both teams trading victories.

At a Raw live event on January 15, 2012, in Oakland, California, Epico and Primo defeated Air Boom to win the WWE Tag Team Championship. The following night on Raw, Primo and Epico successfully defended their titles against Air Boom in a rematch. On the February 27 edition of Raw, Primo and Epico retained their titles in a Triple Threat tag team match against the teams of Kofi Kingston & R-Truth and Dolph Ziggler & Jack Swagger. In the pre-show of WrestleMania XXVIII, Epico and Primo successfully defended their titles against the Usos and Justin Gabriel and Tyson Kidd in a triple threat tag team match. On the April 30 episode of Raw, Epico and Primo lost the titles to Kofi Kingston and R-Truth. In May, Primo, Epico and Mendes joined A. W.'s talent agency. At No Way Out, A.W. turned on them during their #1 contender Fatal Four-Way tag team match and aligned with the Prime Time Players (Titus O'Neil and Darren Young). The following night on Raw, Primo and Epico defeated the Prime Time Players by count-out after O'Neil and Young walked out of the match. The teams continued their feud on WWE Superstars, where Epico lost to Young and Primo beat O'Neil in singles matches. At Money in the Bank, Primo and Epico defeated Young and O'Neil in a tag team match. The feud ended in August when A.W. was released from WWE. At the Survivor Series pay-per-view, Epico took part in a 10 man elimination tag team match, but was eliminated by Tyson Kidd. Primo & Epico could not find any wins after August 2012, and by the first SmackDown of 2013, Primo was on a 20 match losing streak, and Epico was at 17. On the January 9, 2013 episode of NXT, Primo & Epico broke their losing streaks with a win over Bo Dallas and Michael McGillicutty. However, Dallas & McGillicutty gained revenge by defeating Primo & Epico in the first round of the NXT Tag Team Championship tournament to crown the inaugural champions.

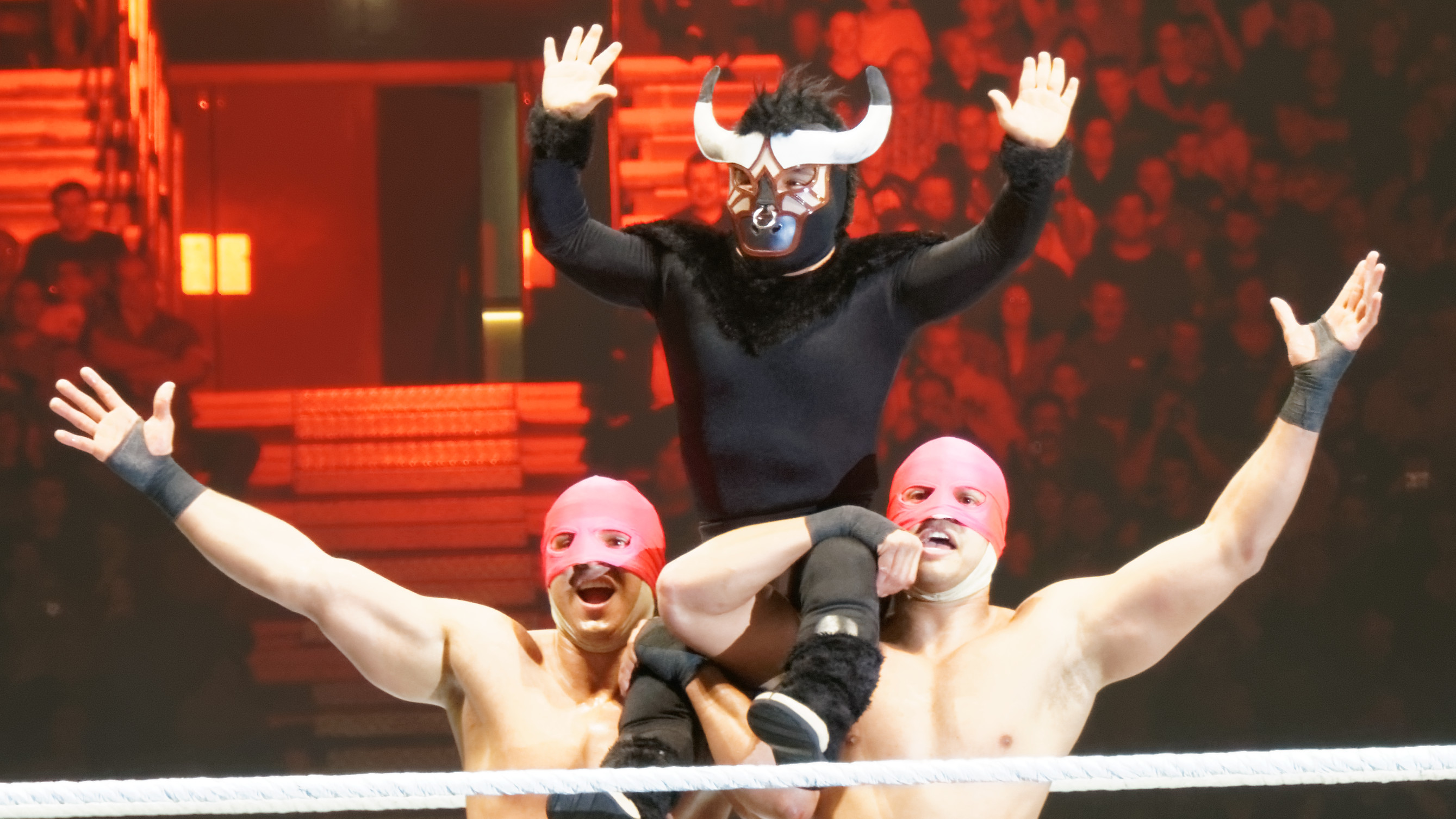
In August 2013, Primo & Epico changed their gimmick to Los Matadores

On the August 19, 2013 episode of Raw, a vignette was aired introducing a new tag team known as Los Matadores, which was Primo and Epico wrestling as masked matadors. Later, on the September 30 edition of Raw, Primo and Epico debuted as Los Matadores, a face team of two masked Spanish bullfighters with El Torito as their mascot and faced 3MB in a winning effort. On April 6, 2014, Los Matadores faced The Usos, Rybaxel, and The Real Americans on the WrestleMania XXX Pre-show in a Fatal four-way Elimination match for the WWE Tag Team Championship in a losing effort. On June 23 WWE.com reported that Fernando was injured at a live event that past weekend. He returned to action on the August 19 episode of Main Event, teaming with Diego in a loss to Slater-Gator (Heath Slater and Titus O'Neil). On the WrestleMania 31 pre-show, the two faced Tyson Kidd and Cesaro, The Usos and The New Day in a Fatal 4-way tag team match for the Tag Team Championship in a losing effort. After more losses, the group showed signs of dissension as one of the matadors attacked El Torito, only to receive a 3D from The Dudley Boyz. The two ceased appearing on TV.

From April 4 to May 9, 2016, several videos aired on Raw promoted the return of Primo and Epico, who revived their Puerto Rican gimmick under the new name The Shining Stars. On the May 16 episode of Raw, The Shining Stars made their debut, defeating a team of local competitors. On the November 7 edition of Raw, after R-Truth sold The Golden Truth's Survivor Series spot for a stay at a timeshare to The Shining Stars, both teams competed to qualify for the 10–on–10 Survivor Series Tag Team Elimination match, which Team Raw won. The Shining Stars were confirmed to be in the Andre The Giant Memorial Battle Royal at WrestleMania 33, however neither of them were successful in winning the royal. During the 2017 WWE Superstar Shake-up, they were moved to SmackDown Live, reverting to the Colóns gimmick. Colón suffered a shoulder injury in November. He underwent surgery in January 2018.

On the August 28, 2018 episode of SmackDown Live, Epico returned with Primo in a triple threat match involving The Bar & Luke Gallows and Karl Anderson, with a victory of The Bar.

On April 15, 2020, Epico was released along with Primo from his WWE contract due to the budget cuts stemming from the COVID-19 pandemic, ending his 10-year tenure with the company.

=== Return to World Wrestling Council (2019–2021) ===
While still part of WWE's roster (yet inactive), The Colóns returned to WWC, working in both administrative roles and as in-ring talent in 2019. He began receiving a push with wins over Noriega and Mighty Ursus. By the summer, Colón was harassed by another wrestler posing as La Pesadilla, and eventually retook the mantle (albeit unmasked most of the time). He was placed in a feud with Gilbert, whom he defeated for his first reign a Universal Heavyweight Champion. At Aniversario, Colón defeated Eli Drake. Afterwards, a storyline began where both of his cousins began pursuing the title. In the first intrafamiliar match, Colón retained against Primo at Septiembre Negro. At Noche de Campeones, all three cousins wrestled each other for the first time in their careers. Colón retained, but his tag team partner turned on the family and rebranded himself Eddie “La Maravilla” Colón, forming a faction known as The Dynasty. To close the season, he went over MechaWolf 450 in a titular match. To open 2020, Colón defeated Texano Jr. to retain the Universal Heavyweight Championship. In early 2021, Colón left the company to create his own project on the island.

=== Total Nonstop Action Wrestling (2025) ===
In early 2025, Colón signed with Total Nonstop Action Wrestling (TNA), performing under his real name Orlando Colón and teaming with his cousin Eddie Colón as The Colóns. They debuted on the February 20, 2025, episode of TNA iMPACT!, defeating Elijah and Joe Hendry in the main event. The following week, on February 27, The Colóns formed an alliance with The System (Eddie Edwards, Brian Myers, and JDC) to shift the balance of power in TNA. On March 6, they faced The Hardys (Jeff and Matt Hardy) in a tag team match. Their last match was on March 15, 2025 when they lost to the Hardy Boyz in an El Paso Street Fight.

=== Second Return to World Wrestling Council (2026-present) ===
After much speculation, Colón made his return to WWC in Aguadilla by attacking Ray González.

== In other media ==
=== Video games ===
He made his first WWE video game appearance in WWE '13 as Epico, Primo's partner. He also appears in WWE 2K16 (as DLC) and WWE 2K17 under the name Fernando as a member of Los Matadores. He appears as Epico Cólon in WWE 2K18 and WWE 2K19.

=== Movies ===
He himself played a role, together with El Torito and Diego, the three of them joined in the racing team Pamplona Especial in the animated movie Scooby-Doo! and WWE: Curse of the Speed Demon, they wore their green eye masks as well as the yellow hot pursuits because they were masked brothers and became a Spanish accent. El Torito himself wore a red, bull-like mask and the red, fluffy costume.

== Championships and accomplishments ==
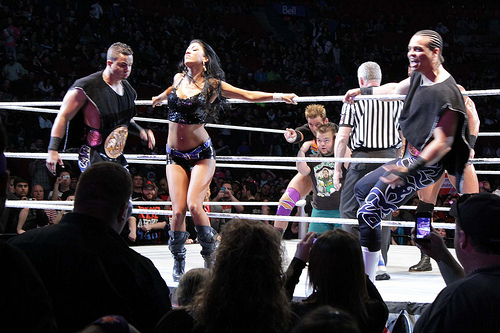
Epico with (far right) Primo (left) and Rosa Mendes as the WWE Tag Team Champions

- Coastal Championship Wrestling
  - CCW Tag Team Championship (1 time) - with Eddie Colón
- Florida Championship Wrestling
  - FCW Florida Tag Team Championship (2 times) – with Hunico
- Global Wrestling Evolution
  - GWE Championship (1 time)
- Pro Wrestling Illustrated
  - PWI ranked him #75 of the top 500 singles wrestlers in the PWI 500 in 2008
  - Ranked No. 151 of the top 500 singles wrestlers in the PWI 500 in 2019
- World Wrestling Council
  - WWC Universal Heavyweight Championship (1 time)
  - WWC Caribbean Heavyweight Championship (1 time)
  - WWC Puerto Rico Heavyweight Championship (6 times)
- WWE
  - WWE Tag Team Championship (1 time) – with Primo

== See also ==
- Primo and Epico
