= J. R. Kratos =

American professional wrestler

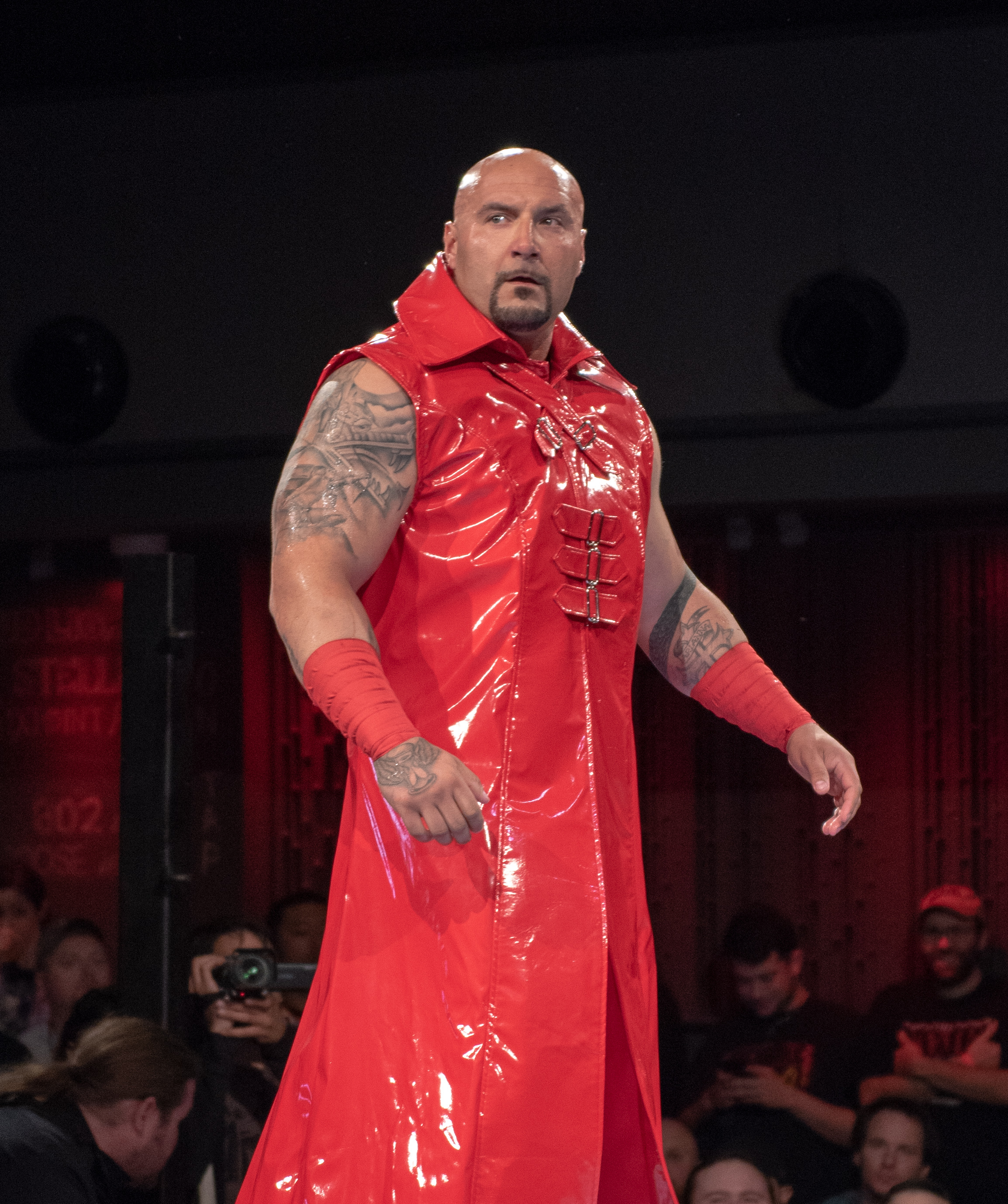
- Kratos in April 2019

Personal information
- Born: June 20, 1982 (age 44) Pacifica, California, U.S.

Professional wrestling career
- Ring names: J. R. Kratos; Kratos
- Billed height: 6 ft 2 in (188 cm)
- Billed weight: 286 lb (130 kg)
- Trained by: Supreme Pro Wrestling Academy; Josh Barnett
- Debut: February 26, 2012

J. R. Kratos (born June 20, 1982) is an American professional wrestler. He is signed to the National Wrestling Alliance (NWA), where he is a former NWA United States Tag Team Champion (with Odinson) and a former two-time NWA World Tag Team Champion. He also makes sporadic appearances for New Japan Pro-Wrestling (NJPW).

== Professional wrestling career ==
=== Early career (2012-2019) ===
Kratos' early career started in the Northern California independent pro wrestling scene where he debuted for Supreme Pro Wrestling. From 2012-2019, Kratos wrestle for All Pro Wrestling on a constant basis. He has also competed in several GCW Bloodsport events after he attended a seminar held by Josh Barnett with Timothy Thatcher and Jeff Cobb.

=== All Japan Pro-Wrestling (2020) ===
Kratos competed for All Japan Pro Wrestling during their Excite Series tour in February 2020 in the midst of the COVID-19 pandemic.

=== National Wrestling Alliance (2020-present) ===
On November 11, 2020, Aron Stevens and Kratos defeated Eli Drake and James Storm to win the NWA World Tag Team Championship. On June 6, at When Our Shadows Fall, Stevens and Kratos successfully defended their titles in a three-way tag team match against The War Kings (Jax Dane and Crimson) and Strictly Business (Thom Latimer and Chris Adonis). On August 29, at the NWA 73rd Anniversary Show, they lost the titles to La Rebelión (Bestia 666 and Mecha Wolf 450). On December 4, at Hard Times 2, Stevens and Kratos failed to beat The OGK (Matt Taven and Mike Bennett) for the ROH World Tag Team Championship.

In 2023, Kratos began teaming up with Odinson, dubbed The Immortals. Having been named to the Crockett Cup tournament, The Immortals reached the quarterfinals of the tournament, where they had lost to the Midnight Riders. On October 28, at Samhain, they defeated Daisy Kill and Talos to win the NWA United States Tag Team Championship. On April 16, 2024 episode of NWA Powerrr, Kratos and Odinson vacated the titles in order to challenge for the NWA World Tag Team Championship at NWA Hard Times, which they were unsuccessful at winning.

=== New Japan Pro-Wrestling (2020-2023) ===
On November 6, 2020 episode of NJPW Strong, Kratos made his NJPW debut teaming with Rust Taylor to defeat Jeff Cobb and Rocky Romero. During the match Tom Lawlor was spotted by Kevin Kelly. Before Lawlor's match with Fred Rosser, it was confirmed that he aligned himself with Kratos and Taylor forming the New Japan version of Team Filthy. Lawlor stated that he teamed up with Kratos and Taylor because he was looking for a fight team that would be the strongest ever seen. Just one week after their formation, Danny Limelight would turn on Romero and join Team Filthy. Together, Team Filthy was victorious against Cobb, Romero, Rosser, and P. J. Black in an eight-man tag team match.

On the October 16, 2021 episode of Strong, Kratos entered a long-running feud with Alex Coughlin spurred on, in part, by his victory against him in Josh Barnett's Bloodsport 4. Kratos would lose against Coughlin twice at the January 29, 2023 episode of NJPW Strong and 2023's Battle in the Valley respectively. During his time on Strong, Kratos also revived a title shot against Fred Rosser for the Strong Openweight Championship on the November 22, 2022 episode of Strong. Kratos had his first NJPW event in Japan at NJPW Independence Day events at Korakuen Hall.

== Discography ==
=== Music videos ===
Year	Song title	Artist(s)
2016	"Never Ever"	Strfkr

== Championships and accomplishments ==
- All Pro Wrestling
  - APW Universal Heavyweight Championship (2 times)
  - APW Worldwide Internet Championship (1 time)
- Gold Rush Pro Wrestling
  - GRPW Heavyweight Championship (1 time)
  - GRPW Tag Team Championship (1 time) – with Colt Stevens
  - Golden Thrones Tournament (2016) – with Nicole Savoy
- National Wrestling Alliance
  - NWA United States Tag Team Championship (1 time) – with Odinson
  - NWA World Tag Team Championship (2 times) – with Aron Stevens (1) and Odinson (1)
  - Crockett Cup (2025) - with Odinson
- Premier Wrestling
  - Premier Heavyweight Championship (1 time)
- Pro Wrestling Revolution
  - PWR World Heavyweight Championship (1 time)
  - PWR Tag Team Championship (1 time) - with Colt Stevens
- Supreme Pro Wrestling
  - SPW Heavyweight Championship (3 times)
- Pro Wrestling Illustrated
  - Ranked No. 124 of the top 500 singles wrestlers in the PWI 500 in 2021
