= NWA Hard Times 2 =

2021 National Wrestling Alliance pay-per-view event

Hard Times 2
- Promotional poster
- Promotion: National Wrestling Alliance
- Date: December 4, 2021
- City: Atlanta, Georgia
- Venue: GPB Studios
- Attendance: 90
- Tagline: Revenge Has No Bounds

Pay-per-view chronology
← Previous; 73rd Anniversary Show	Next → Crockett Cup

Hard Times chronology
← Previous; 1	Next → 3

Hard Times 2 was a professional wrestling pay-per-view (PPV) event promoted by the National Wrestling Alliance (NWA). It took place on December 4, 2021, in Atlanta, Georgia, at the GPB Studios. It is the second event in the Hard Times chronology.

== Production ==
=== Storylines ===
Other on-screen personnel
Role:	Name:
Commentators	Joe Galli
Commentators	Tim Storm
Commentators	Velvet Sky
Commentators	Austin Idol (pre-show)

The event featured professional wrestling matches that involved different wrestlers from pre-existing scripted feuds and storylines. Wrestlers portrayed heroes, villains, or less distinguishable characters in scripted events that built tension and culminated in a wrestling match or series of matches. The sixth season of the NWA's weekly flagship program, Power, featured storylines leading up to the event.

For weeks, Melina has been lobbying to get a match for the NWA World Women's Championship against Kamille. After many denials and sneak attacks, Melina won a three-way match on the October 26 EmPowerrr edition of Power, defeating Chelsea Green and Kylie Rae to earn her title match with Kamille at Hard Times.

After Austin Idol cost him an NWA World Television Championship #1 contender's match, Cyon, the NWA's masked mystery man, continued to demand a title match against Idol's main charge Tyrus. On October 27, it was officially announced that Tyrus will defend the television title against Cyon, using his title shot he earned by being on the winning team of the Champions Series, at Hard Times. On November 19, when NWA President Billy Corgan was running down the card for Hard Times, he revealed Tyrus request the match have no time limit and no disqualifications. To help balance this out, Corgan instilled The Pope - who Tyrus defeated to win the championship - as special guest referee.

Since the September 7 episode of Power, an NWA World Tag Team Championship Eliminator tournament has been taking place, with the winners getting a shot against champions La Rebelión (Bestia 666 and Mecha Wolf 450) at Hard Times. The finals will take place on the November 16 episode of PowerrrSurge, where The End (Odinson and Parrow) defeated Hawx Aerie (Luke Hawx and PJ Hawx) to advance to Hard Times.

After By Any Means Necessary, NWA Worlds Heavyweight Champion Trevor Murdoch was having a fan photo shoot inside a steel cage. However, the session was soon interrupted when Mike Knox appeared and attacked Murdoch, locking him and himself in the cage before battering Murdoch with a steel chair. He later would hold up the title over a crowd of wrestlers and Billy Corgan, making his title intentions clear. On November 11, Knox sent in a video, not seeing Murdoch as a true champion and that he's not half the man that his mentor Harley Race ever was. He eventually announced that he would make an appearance at Hard Times. Two days later, Murdoch sent a response to Knox, and demanded Billy Corgan and the NWA Board of Directors make a title match between him and Knox at Hard Times. The match would finally be set by the NWA on November 15 for the main event of Hard Times.

At NWA 73, Judais won a battle royal to become the #1 contender to the NWA National Championship. After two months, and defending his title shot against James Storm and Sal Rinauro, it was announced that Judais will have his match against champion Chris Adonis at Hard Times.

After Nick Aldis lost the NWA Worlds Heavyweight Championship at NWA 73, tensions between him and his stable Strictly Business (Kamille, Chris Adonis, and Thom Latimer) began to rise. It all amounted on the October 5 episode of Power, where Adonis and Latimer were defeated by Aldis and Tim Storm in a tag team match. After the match, Strictly Business brutalized their now-former leader, to the point where Aldis was carried out on a stretcher. Latimer would continue to assault Aldis on behalf of Strictly Business, even attacking him after a match Aldis had in Chorzów, Poland. At By Any Means Necessary, Aldis and Trevor Murdoch defeated Strictly Business in another tag team match. On November 19, Aldis and Latimer were set for a grudge match at Hard Times, with no accompaniments allowed at ringside. Furthermore, if either man is disquailified, they will be suspended for 8 weeks.

When Billy Corgan introduced the full card for Hard Times, he announced the return of the NWA World Junior Heavyweight Championship, with the new champion to be determined in a four-way match at the NWA's next pey-per-view event. Two qualifying matches will take place at Hard Times: On the preshow, a 12-man gauntlet match will determine an immediate finalist, while Austin Aries and Ring of Honor's Rhett Titus will wrestle on the main show for a spot in the tournament. At the event, it was announced that Darius Lockhart, who was originally supposed to partake in the gauntlet match, was injured, and his spot was filled in by Ricky Morton.

== Results ==
No.	Results	Stipulations	Times
1^{P}	Mims (with Crimson) defeated Jax Dane	Singles match	6:01
2^{P}	The Hex (Allysin Kay and Marti Belle) (c) defeated Team Ambition (Kylie Rae and Tootie Lynn), Missa Kate and Natalia Markova, and Jennacide and Paola Blaze (with Taryn Terrell)	Four-way tag team match for the NWA World Women's Tag Team Championship; This was Jennacide's Champions Series cash-in match	6:34
3^{P}	Homicide won by last eliminating Kerry Morton	NWA World Junior Heavyweight Championship qualifying gauntlet match	21:30
4	Austin Aries defeated Rhett Titus	NWA World Junior Heavyweight Championship quarter final match	9:03
5	The OGK (Matt Taven and Mike Bennett) (c) defeated Aron Stevens and JR Kratos	Tag team match for the ROH World Tag Team Championship	10:57
6	Colby Corino (with Jay Bradley and Wrecking Ball Legursky) defeated Doug Williams	Singles match	8:46
7	Mickie James (c) defeated Kiera Hogan	Singles match for the Impact Knockouts Championship	8:46
8	Tyrus (c) (with Austin Idol, BLK Jeez, and Jordan Clearwater) defeated Cyon	No Disqualificaion, no time limit match for the NWA World Television Championship with The Pope as special guest referee This was Cyon's Champions Series cash-in match	15:54
9	Chris Adonis (c) defeated Judais (with Father James Mitchell)	Singles match for the NWA National Championship	10:53
10	La Rebelión (Bestia 666 and Mecha Wolf 450) (c) defeated The End (Odinson and Parrow)	Tag team match for the NWA World Tag Team Championship	7:47
11	Nick Aldis defeated Thom Latimer	Grudge match No accompaniments at ringside If either man is disqualified, they will be suspended for 8 weeks	11:16
12	Kamille (c) defeated Melina	Singles match for the NWA World Women's Championship	12:42
13	Trevor Murdoch (c) defeated Mike Knox	Singles match for the NWA Worlds Heavyweight Championship	8:15
(c) / – the champion(s) heading into the match; P / – the match was broadcast on the pre-show

=== NWA World Tag Team Championship Eliminator Tournament ===
First round NWA Power; September 7, 14, and 28
Cyon and Jordan Clearwater	7:57
The End (Odinson and Parrow)	Pin
The Rude Dudes (El Rudo and Jamie Stanley)	4:20
Aron Stevens and J. R. Kratos	Pin
The Big Strong Pals (Matthew Mims and Sal Rinauro)	Pin
Marshe Rockett and Slice Boogie	6:05
Hawx Aerie (Luke Hawx and PJ Hawx)	Pin
Colby Corino and JTG	7:43

Semi-finals; NWA Power; October 12
The End	Pin
Aron Stevens and JR Kratos	5:27
The Big Strong Pals	8:56
Hawx Aerie	Pin

Final; NWA PowerSurge; November 16
The End	Pin
Hawx Aerie	4:46

=== NWA World Junior Heavyweight Championship qualifying gauntlet match entrances and eliminations ===
Draw	Entrant	Order	Eliminated by	Method of elimination	Elimination(s)
1	Kerry Morton	11	Homicide	Pinfall	2
2	Luke Hawx	9	Kerry Morton	Pinfall	2
3	Sal Rinauro	1	Luke Hawx	Pinfall	0
4	Ariya Daivari	2	PJ Hawx	Pinfall	0
5	PJ Hawx	10	Homicide	Pinfall	1
6	CW Anderson	4	Kerry Morton	Pinfall	1
7	Alex Taylor	3	CW Anderson	Pinfall	0
8	Homicide	–	Winner	–	3
9	Victor Benjamin	5	Homicide	Pinfall	0
10	Ricky Morton	8	Luke Hawx	Pinfall	2
11	Jeremiah Plunkett	6	Ricky Morton	Pinfall	0
12	Jamie Stanley	7	Ricky Morton	Pinfall	0
