= Parrow (wrestler) =

American wrestler (born 1982)

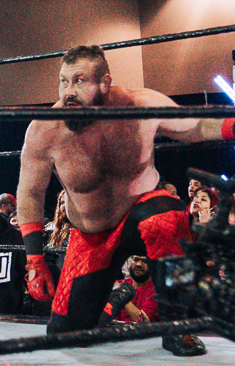
- Parrow in April 2024

Personal information
- Born: February 9, 1982 (age 44) Troy, New York, U.S.
- Spouse: Morgan Cole (m. 2020)

Professional wrestling career
- Ring name: Mike Parrow Mikey Parrow
- Billed height: 194 cm (6 ft 4 in)
- Billed weight: 133 kg (293 lb)
- Trained by: Team 3D Wrestling Academy (Bubba Ray Dudley and Devon Dudley)
- Debut: 2010

Michael Parrow (born February 9, 1982), better known mononymously by his ring name Parrow, is an American professional wrestler who is currently working as a freelancer on the independent circuit. He is best known for his tenures with various promotions such as Full Impact Pro (FIP), National Wrestling Alliance (NWA) and All Japan Pro Wrestling (AJPW).

== Professional wrestling career ==
=== American independent circuit (2010–present) ===
Among his main field promotions, Parrow also shared brief or longer tenures with various other promotions from the American independent scene such as Full Impact Pro, Game Changer Wrestling, National Wrestling Alliance, Evolve, World Xtreme Wrestling and many others.

At EVOLVE 102, an event promoted by Evolve Wrestling on April 5, 2018, Parrow teamed up with Odinson to defeat Doom Patrol (Chris Dickinson and Jaka), Catch Point (Dominic Garrini and Tracy Williams) and The WorkHorsemen (Anthony Henry and James Drake) in an Evolve Tag Team Championship scramble tag team match. They later challenged reigning champions Dickinson and Jaka for the titles at EVOLVE 104 on May 19, 2018, but came out unsuccessfully.

At One Shot, an event promoted by Major League Wrestling on October 5, 2017, Parrow teamed up with Saieve Al Sabah in a losing effort against Rhett Giddins and Seth Petruzelli.

Parrow made one appearance for Ring of Honor at ROH Wrestling #385 on January 12, 2019, where he teamed up with Odinson and Ken Dixon in a losing effort against Joe Keys and Sons Of Savagery (Bishop Khan and Malcolm Moses) in a six-man tag team match.

==== Full Impact Pro (2017–2022) ====
Parrow made his debut in Full Impact Pro at FIP Everything Burns 2017 on January 8, where he teamed up with Drennen to unsuccessfully challenge The Hooligans (Devin Cutter & Mason Cutter) for the FIP World Tag Team Championship. During his tenure with the promotion, Parrow won the tag team titles on one occasion alongside his long time tag team partner Odinson.

==== Game Changer Wrestling (2019–present) ====
Parrow made his debut in Game Changer Wrestling at Joey Janela's Spring Break 3 on April 7, 2019, where he competed in the traditional Clusterfuck Battle Royal, bout which ended in a no-contest, but which involved notable opponents such as A-Kid, SeXXXy Eddy, Shad Gaspard, Homicide, Swoggle, Teddy Hart and many others. One year later at Spring Break 4, Parrow competed once again in the traditional battle royal, won by "Spyder" Nate Webb and also involving Mance Warner, Matthew Justice, Effy, Cassandro El Exotico, Jody Threat and many others. His latest appearance in the battle royal took place at Spring Break: Clusterfuck Forever in April 2024.

Parrow also competed in other signature events of the promotion such as The Wrld on GCW from January 23, 2022, where he wrestled in a Pabst Blue Ribbon Kickoff Battle Royal, bout won by Big Vin and also involving Psycho Clown, Dark Sheik, Ruckus, B-Boy, Lufisto and others. As for the Jersey J-Cup, Parrow accompanied Tony Deppen at ringside during a match at the 2024 edition.

==== National Wrestling Alliance (2021–2022) ====
Parrow made his debut in National Wrestling Alliance at NWA Powerrr #27 on March 23, 2021, where he defeated Jordan Clearwater in singles competition. He soon started competing in major events, first of them being NWA When Our Shadows Fall on June 6, 2021, where he teamed up with Odinson in a losing effort against La Rebelión (Mecha Wolf and Bestia 666), Slice Boogie and Marshe Rockett, and Sal Rinauro and Sam Rudo in a Four-way tag team match. At NWA 73rd Anniversary Show on August 29, 2021, Parrow and Odinson teamed up with Da Pope in a losing effort against Tyrus, Cyon, and Jordan Clearwater. Odinson and Parrow won a number one contendership tournament for the NWA World Tag Team Championship by defeating Cyon and Jordan Clearwater in the first rounds, Aron Stevens and J. R. Kratos in the semifinals, and Hawx Aerie (Luke Hawx and PJ Hawx) in the finals which occurred on November 16, 2021, at NWA PowerSurge. They unsuccessfully challenged Bestia 666 and Mecha Wolf 450 for the tag team titles at NWA Hard Times 2 on December 4, 2021. At the 2022 edition of the Crockett Cup, Parrow and Odinson fell short to Hawx Aerie (Luke Hawx and PJ Hawx) in the first rounds.

Besides tag team work, Parrow also scored several attempts in seizing singles titles. At NWA Powerrr 28 on May 25, 2021, he competed in a number one contender battle royal for the NWA World's Heavyweight Championship won by Trevor Murdoch and also involving Tyrus, Fred Rosser, Jax Dane, Marshe Rockett, Slice Boogie and others. At NWA Powerrr 30, Parrow fell short to Chris Adonis and Thom Latimer in a NWA National Championship qualifying match.

=== Japanese independent circuit ===
==== All Japan Pro Wrestling (2018–2019; 2024) ====
Parrow made his debut in All Japan Pro Wrestling at the 2018 edition of the Real World Tag League where he teamed up with his "The End" tag team partner Odinson and scored a total of twelve points after going against the teams of Joe Doering and Dylan James, Jun Akiyama and Daisuke Sekimoto, Kai and Kengo Mashimo, Shuji Ishikawa and Suwama, Kento Miyahara and Yoshitatsu, Takao Omori and Manabu Soya, Zeus and The Bodyguard, Jake Lee and Ryoji Sai, Yuma Aoyagi and Naoya Nomura, Tajiri and Gianni Valletta. One year later at the 2019 edition of the event, he teamed up with Odinson again, scoring a total of eight points after competing against the teams of Shuji Ishikawa and Suwama, Jake Lee and Naoya Nomura, Kai and Tajiri, Joe Doering and Jun Akiyama, Zeus and Ryoji Sai, Takashi Yoshida and Gianni Valletta, Kento Miyahara and Yuma Aoyagi, Yoshitatsu and Joel Redman, and Daisuke Sekimoto and The Bodyguard. On the final night of the AJPW Dynamite Series 2019 from June 30, Parrow and Odinson unsuccessfully challenged Violent Giants (Shuji Ishikawa and Suwama) for the AJPW World Tag Team Championship.

Parrow returned to the company with Odinson on the first night of the AJPW Super Power Series 2024 from May 29, where they unsuccessfully challenged Saito Brothers (Jun Saito and Rei Saito) for the World Tag Team Championship.

=== British independent circuit ===
At PROGRESS Chapter 66: Mardi Graps on April 6, 2018, Parrow competed in an eight-man thunderbastard match won by Jeff Cobb and also involving Chris Brookes, Darby Allin, Joey Janela, Maxwell Jacob Friedman and Rickey Shane Page.

== Personal life ==
Parrow is openly gay. He married his long time partner Morgan Cole in March 2020.

== Championships and accomplishments ==
- American Combat Wrestling
  - ACW Heavyweight Championship (1 time)
- Brawl USA
  - Brawl Tag Team Championship (1 time) – with Jonathan Grover
- Full Impact Pro
  - FIP World Tag Team Championship (1 time) – with Odinson
- I Believe In Wrestling
  - AWA Florida Tag Team Championship (1 time) – with Chico Adams
- New South Pro Wrestling
  - New South Tag Team Championship (1 time) – with Odinson
- No Peace Underground
  - NPU Championship (1 time)
- National Wrestling Alliance
  - NWA World Tag Team Championship #1 Contendership Tournament (2021) – with Odinson
- Pro Wrestling Illustrated
  - Ranked No. 236 of the top 500 singles wrestlers in the PWI 500 of 2022
- World Xtreme Wrestling
  - WXW Television Championship (1 time)

Classement PWI 500
Year	2020	2021	2022
Rank	432	▲248	▲236
