= NWA Into the Fire =

2019 National Wrestling Alliance pay-per-view event

- Official poster featuring Nick Aldis
- Promotion: National Wrestling Alliance
- Date: December 14, 2019
- City: Atlanta, Georgia
- Venue: GPB Studios

Pay-per-view chronology
← Previous; Crockett Cup	Next → Hard Times (2020)

NWA Into the Fire (also stylized Into the 🔥🔥🔥) was a professional wrestling pay-per-view (PPV) event produced by the National Wrestling Alliance (NWA) that took place on December 14, 2019 in Atlanta, Georgia. This was the first pay-per-view event produced exclusively by NWA since becoming a singular wrestling promotion. The event takes its name from the 1984 heavy metal single, "Into the Fire" by the American band, Dokken, which was used as the theme song to NWA Power, the promotion's weekly series that debuted on October 8, 2019.

In the main event Nick Aldis successfully defended the NWA Worlds Heavyweight Championship against James Storm in a two-out-of-three falls match. On the undercard Aron Stevens defeated Colt Cabana and Ricky Starks to win the NWA National Championship. The NWA World Tag Team Champions, The Rock 'n' Roll Express (Ricky Morton and Robert Gibson), retained the championship against former champions The Wild Cards (Thomas Latimer and Royce Isaacs). The show featured four additional matches.

During the event, NWA announced they were reintroducing the NWA World Television Championship at their January PPV, Hard Times. Marty Scurll from Ring of Honor also made a surprise appearance.

== Production ==
=== Background ===
Other on-screen personnel
Role:	Name:
Commentators	Joe Galli
Commentators	Stu Bennett

During the October 15, 2019, episode of NWA's weekly show, NWA Power, it was announced that they would be holding a pay-per-view called Into the Fire on December 14. This would be the first pay-per-view event produced exclusively by NWA since becoming a singular wrestling promotion.

=== Storylines ===
Into the Fire featured seven professional wrestling matches, with different wrestlers involved in pre-existing scripted feuds, plots and storylines. Wrestlers portrayed either heels or faces as they engaged in a series of tension-building events, which culminated in a wrestling match. The first season of NWA's weekly flagship program, Powerrr, featured storylines leading up to the pay-per-view.

== Reception ==
Josiah MacDonald, while reviewing the show for Wrestling Observer Newsletter, called it " an excellent PPV from the NWA". In Jason Powell's review for pro wrestling dot net, stated that it "was a really fun show. They found the right balance between in-ring action and promos that works for them, and they saved the two best matches and the big surprise for the end of the night to close things on a high note." He described the NWA National Championship match as "The best match of the night thus far. Cabana and Starks worked well together, and Stevens continues to be laugh out loud funny" and for the main event commented that "the main event was good." but also stated, "I wasn’t a fan of the third fall finish."

The Cage Side Seats review referred to the show as "a mighty fine show" but then remarked "One critique is that there were too many tricky finishes with shenanigans. It also didn’t feel like any feuds were settled". The review mentioned Eli Drake vs. Ken Anderson as the match of the night with Cabana/Steves/Starks as the runner up. The overall rating from 411mania reviewer gave the show a 7 out of 10, with the last two matches of the show rated at 3.5 stars out of 5. As part of his review he stated that it was "a strong PPV from the company, staying true to the formula laid out with Power".

== Results ==
No.	Results	Stipulations	Times
1	Eli Drake defeated Ken Anderson	Singles match	9:15
2	Thunder Rosa defeated Tasha Steelz	Singles match	4:15
3	The Question Mark (with Aron Stevens) defeated Trevor Murdoch	Singles match	5:55
4	The Rock 'n' Roll Express (Ricky Morton and Robert Gibson) (c) (with Eddie Kingston and Homicide) defeated The Wild Cards (Royce Isaacs and Thomas Latimer) (with Dave Dawson and Zane Dawson)	Tag team match for the NWA World Tag Team Championship	5:05
5	Allysin Kay and ODB defeated Melina and Marti Belle	Tag team match	7:25
6	Aron Stevens (with The Question Mark) defeated Colt Cabana (c) and Ricky Starks	Triple Threat match for the NWA National Championship	12:20
7	Nick Aldis (c) defeated James Storm (2–1)	Two-out-of-three falls match for the NWA World Heavyweight Championship (Note: Brian Hebner was the referee for the first fall, Tim Storm was the referee for the second fall. The referee for the 3rd fall was determined by a coin flip, won by Hebner.)	22:00
(c) / – the champion(s) heading into the match

== See also ==
- 2019 in professional wrestling
