= NWA Hard Times 3 =

2022 National Wrestling Alliance pay-per-view event

Hard Times 3
- Promotional poster
- Promotion: National Wrestling Alliance
- Date: November 12, 2022
- City: Chalmette, Louisiana
- Venue: Frederick J. Sigur Civic Center
- Attendance: 600-700

Pay-per-view chronology
← Previous; 74th Anniversary Show	Next → Nuff Said

Hard Times chronology
← Previous; 2	Next → 2024

Hard Times 3 (also known as Hard Times in New Orleans) was a professional wrestling pay-per-view (PPV) event promoted by the National Wrestling Alliance (NWA). It took place on November 12, 2022 at the Frederick J. Sigur Civic Center in Chalmette, Louisiana. It was the third event in the Hard Times chronology.

Sixteen matches were contested at the event, including four on the pre-show. In the main event, Tyrus defeated Matt Cardona and Trevor Murdoch to win the NWA Worlds Heavyweight Championship. In other prominent matches, Kamille defeated Chelsea Green and KiLynn King to retain the NWA World Women's Championship, La Rebelión (Bestia 666 and Mecha Wolf) defeated Hawx Aerie (Luke Hawx and PJ Hawx) to retain the NWA World Tag Team Championship, and Kerry Morton defeated Homicide to win the NWA World Junior Heavyweight Championship.

== Production ==
=== Background ===
Other on-screen personnel
Role:	Name:
Commentators	Joe Galli
Commentators	Tim Storm
Commentators	Velvet Sky
Ring announcer	Kyle Davis
Interviewer	Kyle Davis

On August 27, 2022, during the 74th Anniversary Show, it was announced that Hard Times would take place on November 12 at the Frederick J. Sigur Civic Center in Chalmette, Louisiana.

=== Storylines ===
The event featured professional wrestling matches that involved different wrestlers from pre-existing scripted feuds and storylines. Wrestlers portrayed heroes, villains, or less distinguishable characters in scripted events that built tension and culminated in a wrestling match or series of matches. The tenth season of the NWA's weekly flagship program, Power, as well as the fourth season of their secondary program, NWA USA, featured storylines leading up to the event.

At Alwayz Ready, then-reigning NWA Worlds Heavyweight Champion Matt Cardona was forced to vacate the title due to a torn bicep. Trevor Murdoch - who Cardona defeated to win the title - would regain it in a four-way match against Nick Aldis, Thom Latimer, and Sam Shaw in the main event. On the August 30 episode of Powerrr, Cardona announced that he would challenge Murdoch for the title at Hard Times, with the match being made official on September 20. However, on the September 24 episode of NWA USA, NWA World Television Champion Tyrus, who unsuccessfully challenged Murdoch for the world title on Night two of the NWA 74th Anniversary Show, announced he would invoke his "Lucky Seven" opportunity, vacating the television title for a world title match. He would be added to Murdoch and Cardona's bout at Hard Times 3, making it a three-way match.

On Night One of the NWA 74, Kamille successfully defended the NWA World Women's Championship against Taya Valkyrie. On the September 6 edition of Powerrr, Valkyrie defeated Chelsea Green, Jennacide, and KiLynn King to become number one contender, while Kamille went to a time limit draw with Allysin Kay in a title match; setting up a rematch between the two for Hard Times 3. However, Bully Ray argued that King, his former trainee, deserved the title shot, so a match between Valkyrie and King was set for the October 11 Powerrr. There, King defeated Valkyrie for the right to challenge Kamille at Hard Times 3, a rematch of their first encounter at Alwayz Ready. On the October 18 Powerrr, Green defeated Angelina Love to win Velvet Sky's "Champions Series" title opportunity, which Green used to enter the title match at the event.

On the August 30 Powerrr, NWA legend Ricky Steamboat announced a tournament to crown a number one contender to Cyon's NWA National Championship. Qualifying matches would begin later that week on the September 3 and subsequent episodes of NWA USA. On the September 19 Powerrr, the semifinals began, with Dak Draper and Chris Adonis advancing to the finals after defeating Brian Myers and "Magic" Jake Dumas, respectively. On the subsequent episode of NWA USA, "Thrillbilly" Silas Mason defeated Judais to advance. On the October 11 Powerrr, Draper defeated Adonis and Mason to earn the title match against Cyon at Hard Times 3.

At NWA 74, Homicide defended the NWA World Junior Heavyweight Championship against both Kerry and Ricky Morton on consecutive nights. A few weeks later on the September 24 NWA USA, Kerry won a six-way scramble to earn another title match against Homicide at Hard Times 3.

On Night 1 of NWA 74, EC3 made his debut, defeating Matthew Mims. After the match, EC3 cut a promo saying that the NWA is a place of nostalgia, which he believes is nothing but a "crutch," and will ensure that nostalgia in professional wrestling is dead as long as he competes. Thom Latimer would confront EC3 in the ring to defend the NWA, setting up a match between the two for the following night. That match ended in a no contest when members of EC3's Control Your Narrative (CYN) promotion attacked Latimer. In the weeks leading to Hard Times, EC3 would continue to lambast the NWA for their reliance on nostalgia, while also questioning Latimer's purpose in the promotion. It came to a head on the October 4 episode of Powerrr, where Latimer confronted EC3 and challenged him to a match for later that show however EC3 counter proposed to have the match at the Hard Times 3, which Latimer accepted.

On the October 15th episode of NWA USA, NWA World Women's Tag Team Champions Pretty Empowered (Kenzie Paige and Ella Envy) were defeated in a non-title tag team match by a team that consisted of Madi Wrenkowski and Missa Kate. Three days later on the October 18 Powerrr, during the show's control center segment hosted by Kyle Davis, he announced that NWA President Billy Corgan was impressed by Wrenkowski and Kate enough that he gave that team a title match at Hard Times 3.

On October 20, the NWA announced that New Orleans natives Hawx Aerie (Luke Hawx and PJ Hawx) would be in tag team action at Hard Times 3, however no opponents had been announced. On the November 1 episode of Powerrr, Hawx Aerie defeated The Dirty Sexy Boys (Dirty Dango and JTG) to become number one contenders to the NWA World Tag Team Championship, and will face champions La Rebelión (Bestia 666 and Mecha Wolf) at Hard Times 3.

On the Powerrr after NWA 74, Aron Stevens announced the return of The Question Mark, which was really his client Rodney Mack under the Question Mark mask. However, two weeks later, after "The Question Mark" and KC Roxx - Stevens' other client - lost a tag team match, a new Question Mark emerged and attacked Stevens. They would later reveal themselves as The Question Mark II, the brother of the original Question Mark, Joseph Hudson. On the October 25 episode of PowerrrSurge, Kyle Davis announced a Mask vs. Mask match between both Question Marks for Hard Times, with the loser being forced to unmask.

After Tyrus had invoked the "Lucky Seven" to enter the world title match, the NWA World Television Championship was held as vacant. Two five-way elimination matches took place on the October 1 edition of NWA USA to determine the two wrestlers who would face off for the title at a later date. AJ Cazana and Jordan Clearwater would win their respective matches. The title match would then take place on the October 22 episode of NWA USA, but after many shenanigans, the match ended in a time limit draw. As a result, a rematch would take place at Hard Times, as announced on the October 25 PowerrrSurge with the time limit changed from 10 minutes to 15 minutes for this match only.

==== Cancelled match ====
On Night 2 of NWA 74, Nick Aldis defeated Flip Gordon before the pair were attacked by Odinson, leading to Aldis suffering a concussion. Nine days later on the September 6 episode of Powerrr, Odinson again attacked Gordon after the latter defeated Doug Williams. However, Aldis, who was ringside for the match, would prevent Odinson from doing any more damage. On the October 4 Powerrr, Odinson defeated Gordon before the former was again run off by Aldis. On October 10, the NWA announced that Aldis and Odinson will face off one-on-one at Hard Times 3. However, on November 6, Aldis announced his free agency in 2023, which caused the NWA to legitimately suspend Aldis, who would now not be present for the event. The NWA did not announce a new opponent for Odinson before the event, but Odinson still arrived at the event to see if he would get a substitute opponent.

== Reception ==
The event was criticized due to Tyrus winning the NWA World Championship. Dave Scherer from PWInsider said that the event was "pretty bad". Chris Vetter from Pro Wrestling Dot Net complained about the number of matches.

== Results ==
No.	Results	Stipulations	Times
1^{P}	Mims defeated Anthony Andrews by pinfall	Singles match to determine the number one contender for the NWA World Television Championship	5:08
2^{P}	Slime SZN (Bu Ku Dao and J Spade) (c) defeated The Miserably Faithful (Gaagz the Gymp and Sal the Pal) by pinfall	Tag team match for the WildKat Tag Team Championship	6:58
3^{P}	Anthony Mayweather, Da Pope, and JTG defeated Alex Taylor, Jax Dane, and Mercurio (with Jake Dumas, Christi Jaynes, Danny Dealz, and Chris Silvio, Esq.) by pinfall	Hardcore Team War	10:30
4^{P}	Jordan Clearwater defeated AJ Cazana by pinfall	Singles match for the vacant NWA World Television Championship	10:45
5	Max the Impaler (with Father James Mitchell) defeated Natalia Markova	Voodoo Queen Casket match	8:14
6	Davey Richards (c) defeated Colby Corino by submission	Singles match for the MLW National Openweight Championship	6:42
7	The Question Mark II (with J. R. Kratos) defeated The Question Mark (with Aron Stevens) by pinfall	Mask vs. Mask match	6:00
8	Kerry Morton (with Ricky Morton) defeated Homicide (c) by pinfall	Singles match for the NWA World Junior Heavyweight Championship	10:02
9	"Thrillbilly" Silas Mason defeated Odinson by pinfall	Singles match	4:43
10	The Fixers (Jay Bradley and Wrecking Ball Legursky) (c) defeated The Spectaculars (Brady Pierce and Rush Freeman) (with Rolando Freeman) by pinfall	Tag team match for the NWA United States Tag Team Championship	9:15
11	Cyon (c) (with Austin Idol) defeated Dak Draper by pinfall	Singles match for the NWA National Heavyweight Championship	6:01
12	Pretty Empowered (Ella Envy and Kenzie Paige) (c) defeated Madi Wrenkowski and Missa Kate by pinfall	Tag team match for the NWA World Women's Tag Team Championship	8:12
13	EC3 defeated Thom Latimer by disqualification	Singles match	8:31
14	La Rebelión (Bestia 666 and Mecha Wolf) (c) (with Damián 666) defeated Hawx Aerie (Luke Hawx and PJ Hawx) by pinfall	Tag team match for the NWA World Tag Team Championship	10:48
15	Kamille (c) defeated Chelsea Green and KiLynn King by pinfall	Three-way match for the NWA World Women's Championship; This was Green's Champions Series cash-in match	8:59
16	Tyrus (with BLK Jeez) defeated Trevor Murdoch (c) and Matt Cardona by pinfall	Three-way match for the NWA Worlds Heavyweight Championship	10:03
(c) / – the champion(s) heading into the match; P / – the match was broadcast on the pre-show

=== NWA National Championship Number One Contender's Tournament ===
First Round; NWA Powerrr (September 19); NWA USA (September 24)
Brian Myers	6:34
Dak Draper	Pin
Chris Adonis	Sub
"Magic" Jake Dumas	8:01
Judais	6:04
"Thrillbilly" Silas Mason	Pin

Final; NWA Powerrr (October 11)
Dak Draper	Pin
Chris Adonis
"Thrillbilly" Silas Mason	5:15

=== Hardcore Team War match ===
Eliminated	Wrestler	Eliminated by	Method	Team
1	Alex Taylor	JTG	Pinned after the Brooklyn's Edge	Team Taylor, Dane, and Mercurio
2	JTG	Mercurio	Pinned after Dane hit JTG with Pop the Trunk	Team Mayweather, Pope, and JTG
3	Mercurio	Da Pope	Pinned after hitting a chair-assisted dropkick in the corner	Team Taylor, Dane, and Mercurio
4	Da Pope	Jax Dane	Pinned after a chain-assisted clothesline	Team Mayweather, Pope, and JTG
5	Jax Dane	Anthony Mayweather	Pinned after a diving elbow drop	Team Taylor, Dane, and Mercurio
Winner	Anthony Mayweather	N/A		Team Mayweather, Pope, and JTG
