= NWA Hard Times (2020) =

2020 National Wrestling Alliance pay-per-view event

Hard Times (2020)
- Promotional poster featuring Tim Storm, Nick Aldis, Kamille, and the NWA World Television Championship belt
- Promotion: National Wrestling Alliance
- Date: January 24, 2020
- City: Atlanta, Georgia
- Venue: GPB Studios

Pay-per-view chronology
← Previous; Into the Fire	Next → Back for the Attack

Hard Times chronology
← Previous; First	Next → 2

Hard Times (2020) (stylized as Hard × Times) was the first Hard Times professional wrestling pay-per-view (PPV) event promoted by the National Wrestling Alliance (NWA). It took place on January 24, 2020, in Atlanta, Georgia, United States, at the GPB Studios. The show featured a tournament to crown a new NWA World Television Champion, which was won by Ricky Starks. The event also featured wrestlers from Ring of Honor, including Dan Maff, and Villain Enterprises members Marty Scurll and Flip Gordon.

== Production ==
=== Background ===
Other on-screen personnel
Role:	Name:
Commentators	Joe Galli
Commentators	Stu Bennett

During the December 15, 2019 Into the Fire pay-per-view (PPV), the National Wrestling Alliance (NWA) announced that their next PPV would be held on January 24, 2020 and be called "Hard Times". At the same time the NWA announced they were reintroducing the NWA World Television Championship with a new champion being crowned at the PPV on FITE TV.

=== Storylines ===
Hard Times featured ten professional wrestling matches, with different wrestlers who were involved in pre-existing scripted feuds, plots and storylines. Wrestlers portrayed heels or faces as they engaged in a series of tension-building events, which culminated in a wrestling match. The second season of NWA's weekly flagship program, Power, featured storylines leading up to the pay-per-view.

On the December 17, 2019 episode of the NWA's weekly show, Power, it was revealed that all World Television Championship tournament matches would have a 6 minute, 5 second time limit. The time limit was an homage to the 6:05 PM start time of NWA Power as well as a tribute to the original start time for NWA's World Championship Wrestling that ran from the 1970s to 1992. Announced participants included: Ricky Starks, Eddie Kingston, The Question Mark, Colt Cabana, Tim Storm, Nick Aldis, Zicky Dice, Caleb Konley, Dave Dawson, Zane Dawson, Trevor Murdoch, and Thom Latimer. The first two tournament matches announced were Starks vs. Kingston and The Question Mark vs. Cabana. Starks defeated Kingston via pinfall in 4:10, and The Question Mark defeated Cabana via pinfall in 3:05 with both matches airing on the December 23 episode of Power. On the January 1, 2020 episode of Power, Aldis refused to enter his tournament match against Tim Storm and ordered fellow Strictly Business member Royce Isaacs to take his place. Storm defeated Isaacs via pinfall in 4:26. On the January 7 episode of Power, Tim Storm clarified that these were qualifying matches and that six competitors would move on to the first round of the NWA World Television Championship tournament. He also announced there would be two additional spots open in the first round for competitors not currently on the NWA roster. Zicky Dice defeated Caleb Konley via pinfall in 4:43 later in the show. The tournament bracket was unveiled on the January 14 episode of Power. Zane Dawson def. Dave Dawson via pinfall in 3:56 later in the same episode. On the January 21 episode of Power, Trevor Murdoch defeated Thom Latimer via pinfall in 3:30. Zane Dawson dropped out of the tournament due to a hand injury, and an 8-man Last Chance Gauntlet match was held to determine the new competitor to fill the spot. The eight competitors were C. W. Anderson, Caleb Konley, Josephus, Colt Cabana, Dave Dawson, Aron Stevens, Sal Rinauro, and Ken Anderson. Anderson won when he pinned Cabana, his last remaining opponent. Anderson attacked Cabana after the match. Later in the same episode, the final two competitors in the first round of the tournament were named: Matt Cross from the independent circuit and Dan Maff from Ring of Honor.

At Into the Fire, NWA Worlds Champion Nick Aldis was confronted by Marty Scurll after his title defense. In response, Aldis and the Strictly Business stable attacked Scurll and his Villain Enterprises teammates at Ring of Honor's (ROH) Saturday Night at Center Stage and Honor Reigns Supreme events. On January 14, the NWA announced that Aldis would face Villain Enterprises' Flip Gordon in an interpromotional match at Hard Times.

== Results ==
No.	Results	Stipulations	Times
1	Trevor Murdoch defeated The Question Mark by pinfall	NWA World Television Championship tournament first round match	3:08
2	Dan Maff defeated Zicky Dice by pinfall	NWA World Television Championship tournament first round match	2:35
3	Ricky Starks defeated Matt Cross by pinfall	NWA World Television Championship tournament first round match	3:50
4	Eli Drake and James Storm defeated The Rock 'n' Roll Express (Ricky Morton and Robert Gibson) (c) and The Wild Cards (Royce Isaacs and Thom Latimer) (with Kamille and May Valentine) by pinfall	Triple threat tag team match for the NWA World Tag Team Championship	4:35
5	Thunder Rosa defeated Allysin Kay (c) by pinfall	Singles match for the NWA World Women's Championship	18:05
6	Trevor Murdoch defeated Dan Maff by pinfall	NWA World Television Championship tournament semifinal match	3:27
7	Ricky Starks defeated Tim Storm by pinfall	NWA World Television Championship tournament semifinal match	4:43
8	Scott Steiner defeated Aron Stevens (c) (with The Question Mark) by disqualification	Singles match for the NWA National Championship	6:30
9	Nick Aldis (c) defeated Flip Gordon by pinfall	NWA vs. ROH interpromotional match for the NWA Worlds Heavyweight Championship	15:20
10	Ricky Starks defeated Trevor Murdoch by pinfall	Tournament final match to determine the new NWA World Television Champion	9:20
(c) / – the champion(s) heading into the match

=== NWA World Television Championship Tournament ===
Qualifiers

NWA Power

First Round

Hard Times

Semifinals

Hard Times

Final

Hard Times

Tim Storm
Pin

Royce Isaacs^{1}
4:26

Tim Storm
Bye^{3}

Ken Anderson^{2}
--

Dave Dawson
3:56

Zane Dawson
Pin

Tim Storm
4:43

Ricky Starks
Pin

Eddie Kingston
4:10

Ricky Starks
Pin

Ricky Starks
Pin

Matt Cross
3:50

Matt Cross
--

Bye
--

Ricky Starks
Pin

Trevor Murdoch
9:20

Zicky Dice
Pin

Caleb Konley
4:43

Zicky Dice
2:35

Dan Maff
Pin

Dan Maff
--

Bye
--

Dan Maff
3:27

Trevor Murdoch
Pin

The Question Mark
Pin

Colt Cabana
3:05

The Question Mark
3:08

Trevor Murdoch
Pin

Trevor Murdoch
Pin

Thom Latimer
3:30

1 Replaced Nick Aldis when Aldis refused to enter and ordered fellow Strictly Business member Isaacs to take his place.
2 Replaced an injured Zane Dawson when Anderson won an 8-man Last Chance Gauntlet match to fill the spot.
3 Anderson was not "medically cleared" to compete giving Tim Storm a bye as a result.

== See also ==
- 2020 in professional wrestling
