= NWA Hard Times =

Hard Times
- Promotions: National Wrestling Alliance
- First event: NWA Hard Times (2020)

NWA Hard Times is a professional wrestling pay-per-view event produced by National Wrestling Alliance (NWA). The first event took place on January 24, 2020, and the second event took place on December 4, 2021, making it a recurring annual pay-per-view event.

== History ==
The inaugural Hard Times event took part on January 24, 2020, at the GPB Studios, in Atlanta, Georgia, where Ricky Starks defeated Trevor Murdoch in the finals of a 12-man single-elimination tournament to become the inaugural NWA World Television Champion.

== Events ==
#	Event	Date	City	Venue	Main event	Ref.
1	Hard Times	January 24, 2020	Atlanta, Georgia	GPB Studios	Ricky Starks vs. Trevor Murdoch in a tournament final for the new NWA World Television Championship	
2	Hard Times 2	December 4, 2021	Atlanta, Georgia	GPB Studios	Trevor Murdoch (c) vs. Mike Knox for the NWA Worlds Heavyweight Championship	
3	Hard Times 3	November 12, 2022	Chalmette, Louisiana	Frederick J. Sigur Civic Center	Trevor Murdoch (c) vs. Matt Cardona vs. Tyrus in a three-way match for the NWA Worlds Heavyweight Championship	
4	Hard Times (2024)	March 2, 2024 (taping for NWA Powerrr)	Dothan, Alabama	Dothan Civic Center	Knox and Murdoch vs. The Southern 6 (Kerry Morton and Alex Taylor) in a Steel Cage match	
5	Hard Times V	March 22, 2025 (taping for NWA Powerrr)	Dothan, Alabama	Dothan Civic Center	Thom Latimer (c) vs. Carson Bartholomew Drake for the NWA Worlds Heavyweight Championship	
6	Hard TImes 6	June 6, 2026 (taping for NWA Powerrr)	Atlanta, Georgia	Center Stage	TBD	
(c) – refers to the champion(s) heading into the match
