= NWA World Television Championship =

Professional wrestling championship

- The current belt

Details
- Promotion: National Wrestling Alliance
- Date established: December 14, 2019
- Current champion: Alex Misery
- Date won: April 25, 2026 (aired June 6, 2026)
Statistics
- First champion: Ricky Starks
- Most reigns: All titleholders (1)
- Longest reign: Tyrus (between 474 and 476 days)
- Shortest reign: Ricky Starks (2 days)
- Oldest champion: Tyrus (48 years, 106 days)
- Youngest champion: Carson Bartholomew Drake (24 years, 251 days)
- Heaviest champion: Tyrus (375lb (170kg)
- Lightest champion: Ricky Starks (195lb (88kg)

The NWA World Television Championship is a world television championship owned and promoted by the American professional wrestling promotion National Wrestling Alliance (NWA). The inaugural champion was Ricky Starks.

On December 14, 2019, the NWA announced they were reintroducing the NWA World Television Championship with a tournament to determine a new champion. Although past Television champions from both the Georgia and Mid-Atlantic versions have been referred to on NWA programming, the original titles and respective lineage are currently owned by WWE. The modern-day NWA World Television Championship is considered the third most important heavyweight title in the current NWA, after the World and National titles. The belt uses the same design as used by JCP/WCW between 1985 and 1992.

== History ==
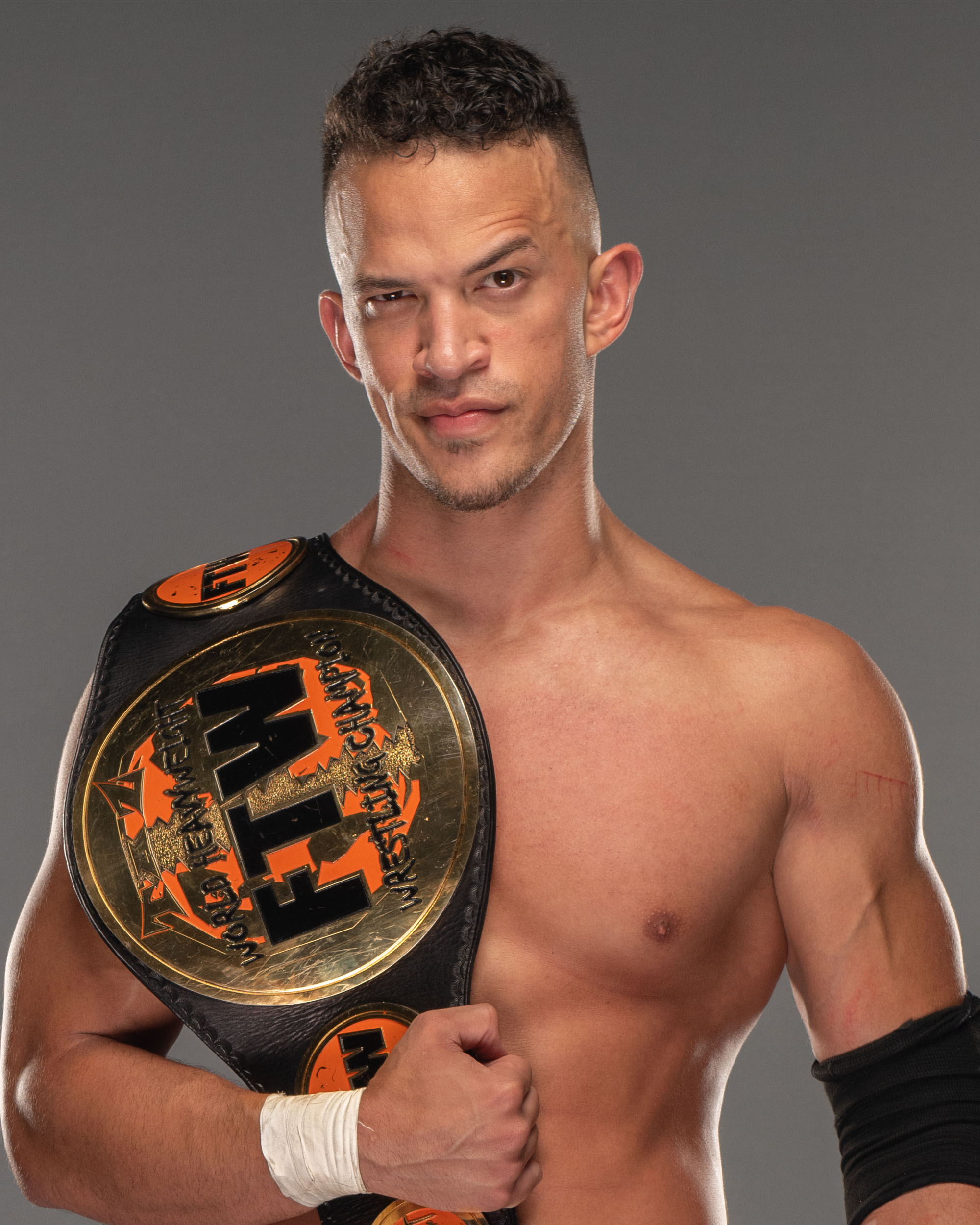
Inaugural champion Ricky Starks.

On December 14, 2019, during NWA's Into the Fire pay-per-view, it was announced they were reintroducing the NWA World Television Championship with a tournament to determine a new champion at their next PPV, Hard Times, on January 24, 2020. On the December 17 episode of NWA's weekly flagship program, NWA Powerrr, it was revealed that all NWA World Television Championship tournament matches would have a 6 minute, 5 second time limit. The time limit was an homage to the 6:05 PM start time of NWA Powerrr as well as a tribute to the original start time for NWA's World Championship Wrestling that ran from the 1970s to 1992. All tournament competitors, as well as two qualifying matches, were then announced. On the January 7 episode of NWA Powerrr, Tim Storm clarified that six competitors would move on to the first round of the NWA World Television Championship tournament. He also announced there would be two additional spots open in the first round for competitors yet to be named and not currently on the NWA roster. The tournament bracket was unveiled on the January 14 episode of NWA Powerrr. On the January 21 episode of NWA Powerrr, the final two competitors in the first round of the tournament were named: Matt Cross from the independent circuit and Dan Maff from Ring of Honor.

On the January 28, 2020 episode of NWA Powerrr, the "Lucky Seven Rule" was announced. A champion who successfully defends the championship seven consecutive times will be eligible to trade in the championship for a match for the NWA Worlds Heavyweight Championship. On March 21, 2021 at Back For The Attack, the NWA extended the time limit for World Television title matches on pay-per-views to ten minutes.

=== Hard Times tournament ===
Qualifier
Tim Storm	Pin
Royce Isaacs^{1}	4:26
Dave Dawson	3:56
Zane Dawson	Pin
Eddie Kingston	4:10
Ricky Starks	Pin
Zicky Dice	Pin
Caleb Konley	4:43
The Question Mark	Pin
Colt Cabana	3:05
Trevor Murdoch	Pin
Thom Latimer	3:30

First Round
Tim Storm	Bye^{3}
Ken Anderson^{2}	--
Ricky Starks	Pin
Matt Cross	3:50
Zicky Dice	2:35
Dan Maff	Pin
The Question Mark	3:08
Trevor Murdoch	Pin

Semifinals
Tim Storm	4:43
Ricky Starks	Pin
Dan Maff	3:27
Trevor Murdoch	Pin

Final
Ricky Starks	Pin
Trevor Murdoch	9:20

1 Replaced Nick Aldis when Aldis refused to enter and ordered fellow Strictly Business member Isaacs to take his place.
2 Replaced an injured Zane Dawson when Anderson won an 8-man Last Chance Gauntlet match to fill the spot.
3 Anderson was not "medically cleared" to compete giving Tim Storm a bye as a result.

== Belt design ==
The current design is the same that Jim Crockett Promotions used from April 1985 to November 1988. It is also the same design World Championship Wrestling used from November 1988 to January 1991 and for the WCW World Television Championship belt from January 1991 to May 1992. The design uses a dual-colored leather strap (black front, red back) as the base. The main plate is nickel silver with a red background for the words “NWA Television Heavyweight Wrestling Champion.” An eagle’s head and wings sit underneath the “NWA” letters, a globe is etched in the silver underneath “Television,” and a wrestling ring with two figures is etched in the silver underneath “Heavyweight Wrestling Champion.” There are four side plates. On the left are the logos of two of the major television networks: NBC and ABC. On the right, the logo of the television network CBS is on one plate while an image of a satellite dish is on the other. The belt was also available in red and white straps.

== Reigns ==
As of November 4, 2026, there have been 11 reigns between 11 champions and four vacancies. Ricky Starks was the inaugural champion. Tyrus reign is the longest between 474 and 476 days, while Starks' reign is the shortest with two days. Tyrus is the oldest champion at 48 years old, while Carson Drake is the youngest at 24 years old.

Alex Misery is the current champion in his first reign. He won the vacant title by defeating Daisy Kill, Wrecking Ball Legursky, Lockjaw Drake, and JAC in a five-way match during the NWA Powerrr tapings in Tampa, Florida, on April 25, 2026. Previous champion Bryan Idol voluntarily relinquished the title when he invoked the "Lucky Seven" rule to get an NWA World's Heavyweight Championship match.

=== Names ===
Name	Years
NWA World Television Championship	December 14, 2019 – present

Key
No.	Overall reign number
Reign	Reign number for the specific champion
Days	Number of days held
+	Current reign is changing daily

No.	Champion	Championship change			Reign statistics		Notes	Ref.
No.	Champion	Date	Event	Location	Reign	Days	Notes	Ref.
National Wrestling Alliance/Lightning One Inc.
1	Ricky Starks	January 24, 2020	Hard Times	Atlanta, GA	1	2	Defeated Trevor Murdoch in the finals of 12-man single-elimination tournament to become the inaugural champion.	
2	Zicky Dice	January 26, 2020	NWA Powerrr	Atlanta, GA	1	268	Aired on tape delay on March 3, 2020.	
3	Da Pope	October 20, 2020	UWN Primetime Live	Long Beach, CA	1	Between 228 and 230		
4	Tyrus	Between June 5, 2021 and June 7, 2021	NWA Powerrr	Atlanta, GA	1	Between 476 or 474	Aired on tape delay on August 6, 2021. The date the title change took place is unknown, as the tapings were held between June 5-7, 2021.	
—	Vacated	September 24, 2022	NWA USA	Atlanta, GA	—	—	Tyrus voluntarily vacated the championship to wrestle for the NWA Worlds Heavyweight Championship as part of the "Lucky Seven Rule".	
5	Jordan Clearwater	November 12, 2022	Hard Times 3	New Orleans, LA	1	92	Defeated AJ Cazana for the vacant title. The time limit was extended for this match only to 15 minutes after the previous match between the same competitors on the October 22nd episode of NWA USA for the title ended in a time limit draw.	
6	Thom Latimer	February 12, 2023	NWA Powerrr	Tampa, FL	1	213	Aired on tape delay on February 14, 2023.	
—	Vacated	August 28, 2023	NWA Powerrr	Tampa, FL	—	—	Latimer voluntarily vacated the championship to wrestle for the NWA Worlds Heavyweight Championship as part of the "Lucky Seven Rule". Aired on September 13, 2023.	
7	Mims	August 29, 2023	NWA Powerrr	Nashville, TN	1	137	Defeated Zicky Dice for the vacant title. Aired on tape delay on October 10, 2023.	
8	Max the Impaler	January 13, 2024	Paranoia	Fort Lauderdale, FL	1	287	Aired at NWA Powerrr on tape delay on February 13, 2024.	
9	Carson Bartholomew Drake	October 26, 2024	Samhain 2	Tampa, FL	1	147	This was a Hell Awaits match. Aired at NWA Powerrr on tape delay on December 10, 2024.	
—	Vacated	March 22, 2025	Hard Times V	Dothan, AL	—	—	Drake voluntarily vacated the championship to wrestle for the NWA Worlds Heavyweight Championship as part of the "Lucky Seven Rule".	
10	Bryan Idol	May 17, 2025	Crockett Cup	Philadelphia, PA	1	280	Defeated Carson Bartholomew Drake for the vacant title. Aired at NWA Powerrr on tape delay on July 29, 2025.	
—	Vacated	February 21, 2026	NWA Powerrr	Tampa, FL	—	—	Idol voluntarily vacated the championship to challenge for the NWA Worlds Heavyweight Championship as part of the "Lucky Seven Rule". Aired on tape delay on March 17, 2026.	
11	Alex Misery	April 25, 2026	NWA Powerrr	Tampa, FL	1	193+	This was a five-way match also involving Daisy Kill, Wrecking Ball Legursky, Lockjaw Drake, and JAC; Misery pinned Legursky to win the vacant title. Aired on tape delay on June 6, 2026.	
