= Joe Cazana Promotions =

American professional wrestling promotion

- Logo introduced in 2023
- Acronym: JCP, NWA JCP Southeast
- Founded: 2017
- Style: Professional wrestling
- Headquarters: Coalfield, Tennessee
- Founder: Joe Cazana
- Owner: Joe Cazana

Joe Cazana Promotions (JCP), also referred to as National Wrestling Alliance Joe Cazana Promotions (NWA JCP Southeast), is an independent professional wrestling promotion headquartered in Coalfield, Tennessee. It is affiliated with the National Wrestling Alliance (NWA) and serves as a territory for the organization.

== History ==
In 2017, Joe Cazana resurrected the Wide World of Wrestling event name which originated from John Cazana's NWA Mid-America television program. Joe Cazana himself had wrestled in the World Wrestling Federation, the National Wrestling Alliance, the American Wrestling Association, Smoky Mountain Wrestling, and World Championship Wrestling before founding Joe Cazana Promotions. By 2022, JCP had been producing a weekly show on their YouTube channel using the Wide World of Wrestling name. On September 15, 2023, JCP booked their first show at the Tennessee Valley Fair at Chilhowee Park in Knoxville, Tennessee. The show was taped into three parts which aired on tape delay on September 28 and 29, 2023.

On December 4, 2023, following a sold-out show two days prior titled How Coalfield Stole Christmas, National Wrestling Alliance (NWA) President and Smashing Pumpkins frontman Billy Corgan announced that Joe Cazana Promotions would join the recently revived NWA territory system.

== Championships ==
Championship	Current champion(s)	Date won	Days held	Event	Location	Notes
NWA JCP Southeastern Heavyweight Championship	Carson Drake	August 1, 2025	375+	The Caldwell Cup	Decatur, Tennessee	
NWA JCP Southeastern Tag Team Championship	The Troublemakers (Canaan Kristopher and Glenn Spectre)	N/A	N/A	N/A	N/A	
NWA JCP Tennessee Stud Championship	Aaron Williams	August 1, 2025	375+	The Caldwell Cup	Decatur, Tennessee	
NWA JCP Women's Championship	Kylie Paige	May 10, 2024	823+	Showdown At Sunbright	Decatur, Tennessee	
