= Trevor Murdoch =

American professional wrestler (born 1980)

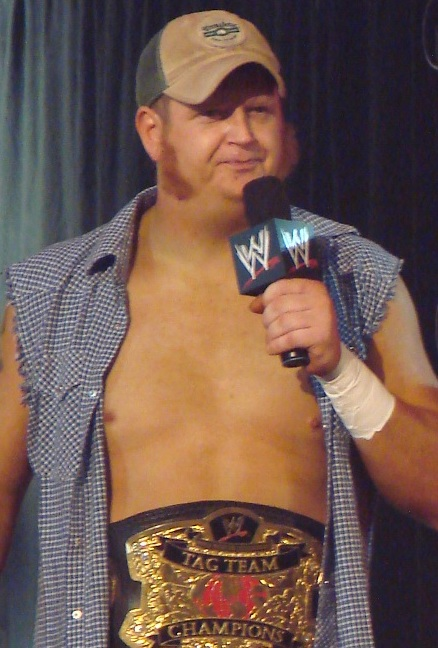
- Murdoch in 2007

Personal information
- Born: William Theodore Mueller; September 10, 1980 (age 46) Fredericktown, Missouri, U.S.
- Spouse: Amanda Mueller (m. 2008)
- Children: 2

Professional wrestling career
- Ring name(s): Jethro Holliday; King Trevor Murdoch I Roscoe Jackson; Scottie Dee; Stan Dupp; Trevor Murdoch; Trevor Rhodes
- Billed height: 6 ft 4 in (193 cm)
- Billed weight: 241 lb (109 kg)
- Billed from: St. Louis, Missouri; Waxahachie, Texas
- Trained by: Harley Race's Wrestling Academy
- Debut: 1999

William Theodore Mueller (born September 10, 1980), better known by his ring name, Trevor Murdoch, is an American professional wrestler and producer. He is signed to the National Wrestling Alliance (NWA), where he performs as King Trevor Murdoch I and is the leader of The Royal Court; he also works as a producer for the company. He is previously known for his appearances with World Wrestling Entertainment (WWE) from 2005 to 2008.

Mueller started his career in 1999, being trained by Harley Race. In 2005, he signed with WWE and was named as Trevor Murdoch after Dick Murdoch. In WWE, he worked with Lance Cade as a tag team, winning the World Tag Team Championship three times. After the dissolution of the team, he was released in 2008. After his release, he briefly worked for Total Nonstop Action Wrestling (TNA) as Jethro Holliday. Murdoch worked for several independent promotions until 2018, when he retired. One year later, he began to work with Billy Corgan's National Wrestling Alliance as a wrestler. In the following years, he won the NWA National Championship once and the NWA Worlds Heavyweight Championship twice. Along with Mike Knox, they won the 2023 Crockett Cup and the NWA World Tag Team Championship.

== Professional wrestling career ==
=== Early career (1999–2005) ===
Mueller started his career training in Central States Wrestling Alliance, in the Missouri area, in 1997. He then moved on to World League Wrestling (WLW) and Harley Race's Wrestling Academy training camp in 1999 and began his wrestling career in WLW. On April 11, 2000, as Trevor Rhodes, he won the WLW Heavyweight Championship by defeating Meng. He then made a name for himself as part of the Dupps, a hillbilly tag team consisting of kayfabe brothers Stan Dupp (Mueller) and Bo Dupp. As a team, The Dupps wrestled in Extreme Championship Wrestling (ECW), Ohio Valley Wrestling (OVW), and Total Nonstop Action Wrestling (TNA). While in OVW, Mueller teamed with Lance Cade. The team was known as TNT. Mueller signed a WWE development deal in June 2005.

=== World Wrestling Entertainment (2005–2008) ===
Mueller signed a 3-year deal with World Wrestling Entertainment in July, 2005. On August 22, 2005, a promo was shown showcasing Mueller's debut along with the returning Lance Cade. He was repackaged as Trevor Murdoch (the surname coming from his likeness to wrestling legend Dick Murdoch, though the two are not related), and the team was simply known as Cade and Murdoch. Cade, playing a smooth-talking cowboy, while Murdoch appeared to be an angry "white trash" southern trucker.

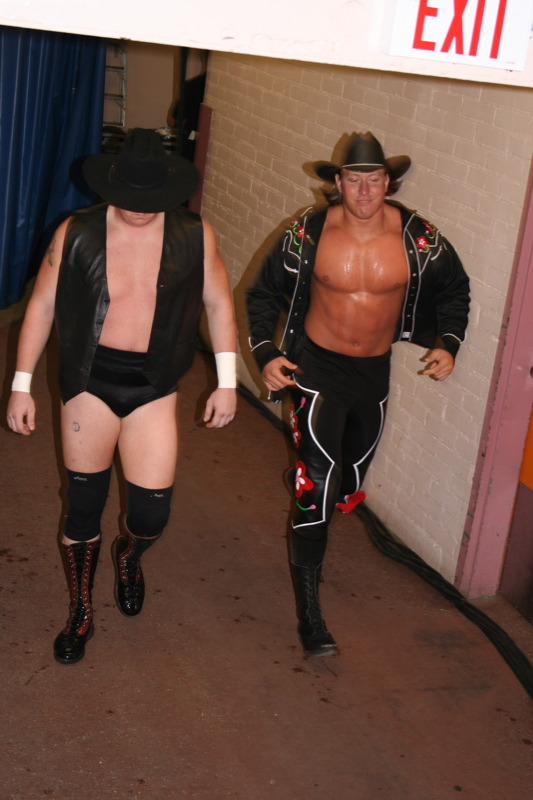
Murdoch (left) with Lance Cade in 2005

Cade and Murdoch won their debut match on the September 5, 2005, episode of Raw. They defeated World Tag Team Champions Hurricane and Rosey in a non-title match, earning themselves a title match at Unforgiven. During the match, Murdoch delivered an elevated DDT on The Hurricane to the outside, causing The Hurricane to suffer a stinger. This allowed Cade and Murdoch to win the World Tag Team Championship. They would eventually lose their title at Taboo Tuesday to Big Show and Kane.

On November 28 during his match against Shelton Benjamin, commentator Joey Styles acknowledged that Murdoch and Lance Cade were no longer a tag team. It was revealed on WWE Unlimited, that Trevor Murdoch set his sights on Ric Flair and the WWE Intercontinental Championship. On Unlimited, Murdoch had been reviewing movies that were, at the time, playing in theaters, such as Brokeback Mountain, King Kong, and Hostel. The first two movie reviews displayed various sexual habits, while the third showed cruelty in his past. The underlying point of all the reviews that Murdoch was trying to convey is that he believes "city folk" have quite an easy life, as opposed to his.

After breaking up with Cade, he wrestled in singles competition on Heat, normally winning most of his matches while still making small appearances on Raw. He would also have a short feud with The Heart Throbs on Heat which involved him defeating both of them in singles action and gaining a spot in the 2006 Royal Rumble, though he did not win. He then moved on to a short feud with Goldust but was unsuccessful in beating him. He would then feud with both Goldust and his tag partner Snitsky. This led to him helping former partner Cade win his matches and hinted at the two of them reforming their team.

Cade and Murdoch later reformed their tag team, with Cade having a new look with long jet black hair. On the September 4 edition of Raw, Murdoch and Cade lost a number one contender's Triple Threat Match for the World Tag Team Title at Unforgiven. Murdoch and Cade then starred in a WWE.com skit, parodying a KFC commercial, where Murdoch mistakenly told Cade he ate the bones, despite eating the boneless original recipe bites. The Highlanders won the match when they pinned Charlie Haas who was teamed with Viscera. Murdoch and Cade then joined forces with Edge to oppose D-Generation X (Triple H and Shawn Michaels).

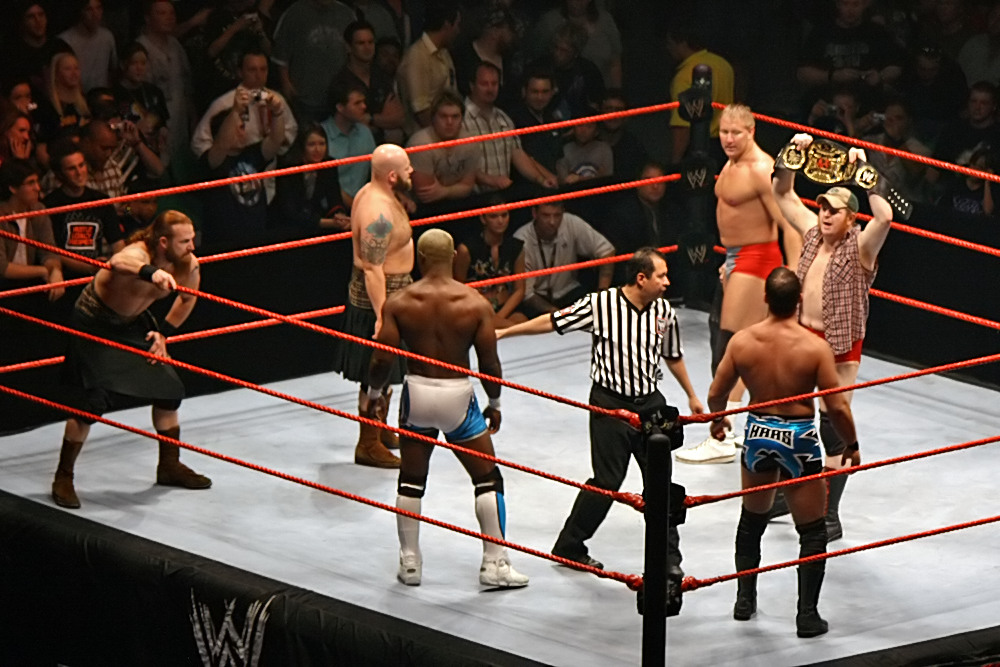
Murdoch (holding the belt) stirs-up his opponents prior to a tag-title match

Cade and Murdoch began a feud in April with World Tag Team Champions The Hardys, leading to their title match at Backlash, which The Hardys won. Cade and Murdoch suddenly gained a great deal of respect for The Hardys and began to praise their abilities. The Hardys then began an alliance with Cade and Murdoch. Despite the alliance, Cade and Murdoch faced The Hardys in a rematch at Judgment Day which The Hardys won. On the June 4 edition of Raw, Cade and Murdoch were given another shot at the World Tag Team Championship against The Hardys. Cade and Murdoch were finally successful, becoming two time World Tag Team Champions. When Cade made the pin on Jeff Hardy, Hardy's foot was on the ropes but was pushed off by Murdoch. After the match, when Matt Hardy argued with Cade and Murdoch, they attacked Matt and Jeff with the tag belts, becoming heels once again. They successfully defended their titles against The Hardys at Vengeance: Night of Champions after Cade pinned Jeff and claimed they retained their belts "all by the rules". After that Cade and Murdoch appeared on Raw and Heat in matches against London and Kendrick, The Highlanders, and Cryme Tyme. On July 23 on Raw, Cade and Murdoch teamed up with Umaga to face John Cena and Candice in a Champions-only handicap tag team match. During the match, Cade and Murdoch trapped Candice in order to set her up for Umaga to attack, until Jeff Hardy came out and attacked Umaga with a steel chair. After Candice left scared, and Umaga was chased to the back by Jeff, Cade & Murdoch were left to square off against John Cena. Cena defeated them when he threw Cade out of the ring and gave Murdoch an FU. Murdoch, along with Cade lost the titles at a house show on September 5 to Paul London and Brian Kendrick, but beat them to take the titles back on the last day of the tour. Murdoch and Cade remained champions until the Raw XV Anniversary show, losing the World Tag Team Championships to the team of Hardcore Holly and Cody Rhodes.

Late in April 2008, Murdoch began to develop a country singing gimmick. On the May 12 edition of Raw, Cade turned on Murdoch following a "victory song," punching Murdoch in the face twice, ending the partnership. The two faced off on the June 2 edition of Raw, with Cade getting the victory.

As part of the 2008 WWE Supplemental Draft, Murdoch was drafted to the SmackDown brand but was released from his WWE contract on July 3, 2008, before his debut.

=== Independent circuit (2008–2011) ===
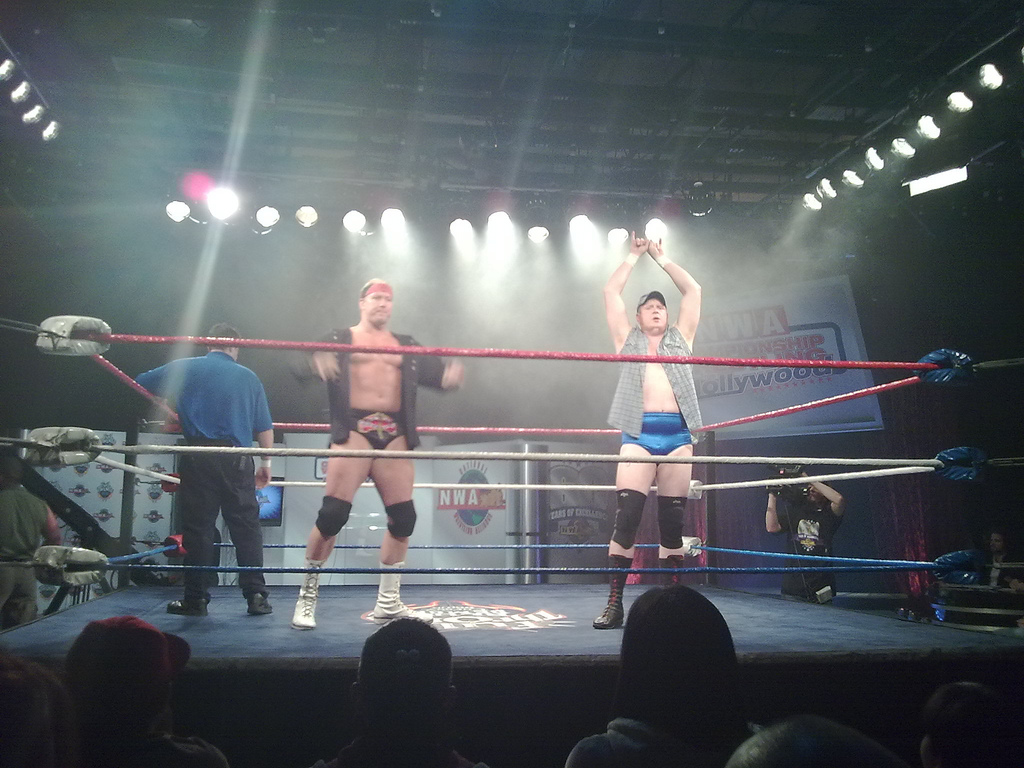
Lance Cade and Trevor Murdoch at NWA Showcase

On July 9, 2008, IWA Mid-South announced that Mueller would be wrestling against Insane Lane as Trevor Murdock at their Gory Days 4 show on July 26 in Sellersburg, Indiana, followed by a match against Nick Gage at Put Up or Shut Up 2008 on August 16 in Portage, Indiana. On August 24, Trevor Murdock lost in an attempt to capture the NWA World Heavyweight Championship from Brent Albright. Lance Cade was released from his WWE contract on October 14, 2008, and less than a week later Cade and Murdoch began accepting bookings together as a team on the independent circuit, including IWA-Mid South. On October 18, Murdoch returned to World League Wrestling facing Chris Masters and Go Shiozaki in a match for the WLW Heavyweight Championship. Murdoch participated in Revolution Strong Style Tournament and Candido Cup and lost both. Murdoch made several appearances for Championship Wrestling from Hollywood before joining Total Nonstop Action Wrestling and continued to make independent appearances while signed to TNA.

In 2010, after leaving TNA, Murdoch defeated Trent Stone in a leather strap match for the WLW Heavyweight Championship and won the MPW Heavyweight Championship in October. He lost the MPW Heavyweight Championship to Derek Stone in the beginning to 2011 and would eventually vacate the WLW Heavyweight Championship. In March, Murdoch toured Pro Wrestling Noah and had a shot at the GHC Heavyweight Championship.

Prior to the live broadcast of Raw on May 9, 2011, Mueller wrestled as 'Trevor Murdoch' in a dark match, which he lost to Evan Bourne. He wrestled a dark match the following night prior to the SmackDown tapings, losing to Jey Uso. On June 17, Mueller announced that he was going to be signing a contract to return to WWE; however, on June 29 he revealed that the deal had fallen through due to budget cuts. As a result, Mueller reportedly considered retiring from professional wrestling.

In November, Murdoch participated in Noah's Global League 2011 in block B. He earned eight points but that was not enough to progress to the next stage. In December 2011, Murdoch took part in TNA's India project, Ring Ka King under the name Roscoe Jackson.

=== Total Nonstop Action Wrestling (2009) ===
Mueller debuted in Total Nonstop Action Wrestling (TNA) on the April 23, 2009, edition of TNA Impact!, under the name "The Outlaw" Jethro Holliday, teaming with Eric Young to defeat the team of No Limit (Naito and Yujiro), advancing to the second round of Team 3D's open invitational tag team tournament. On the May 7 episode of Impact! Holliday and Young lost to Beer Money, Inc. getting eliminated from the tournament. The following week he lost in an "I Quit Match" against Booker T. On June 18, Holliday lost a Clockwork Orange House of Fun match against Raven. On August 13, he turned heel by attacking Abyss with a steel chair, in response to the "bounty" set by Dr. Stevie. At Hard Justice he lost to Abyss and after the match turned face once again by attacking Dr. Stevie. During this time, he was used as a jobber putting over the likes of Bobby Lashley and Daniels. Holliday competed in four Webmatches, On June 5, Holliday and Young defeated No Limit. On June 26, Holliday defeated Jesse Neal. On August 13, Holliday lost to Rhino. On October 9, Holliday lost to Daniels. On November 11, 2009, Mueller was released from his TNA contract.

=== Return to WWE (2011) ===
On May 9, 2011, Murdoch returned to WWE, wrestling in two dark matches, on Raw and on the Smackdown taping the following night. He lost both matches to Evan Bourne and Jey Uso.

=== Ring Ka King (2012) ===
Mueller debuted for Ring Ka King under the name Roscoe Jackson and on February 4, 2012, Jackson, Jimmy Rave and Zema Ion defeated Broadway, Hollywood and Isaiah Cash in a six-man tag team match. on February 12 tapings Jackson lost to "The Outlaw" Isaiah Cash. on February 25 tapings Jackson faced American Adonis in a losing effort. on February 26, Jackson was in the #1 contenders gauntlet for the gold match won by Sir Brutus Magnus. on March 17 tapings Jackson defeated Isaiah Cash. on March 31 tapings Jackson lost a remmatch against Isaiah Cash. on April 8 tapings Jackson was in the #1 contenders battle royal for the heavyweight title won by Mahabali Vera. on April 23 at the final tapings for the promotion Jackson, Chavo Guerrero Jr, Mahabali Veera, Matt Morgan and Pagal Parinda defeated RDX (Abyss, Deadly Danda, Scott Steiner, Sir Brutus Magnus and Sonjay Dutt) in a ten-man tag team match. Ring Ka King shut down on April 22, 2012, and did not return for a second season.

=== Independent circuit and retirement (2013–2016) ===
On May 4, 2013, back under the ring name Trevor Murdoch, he faced Mitch Paradise in a losing effort. On May 5, 2013, Murdoch and Heather Patera defeated Dan Jesser and Shelly Martinez in a mix tag team match. On August 23, 2014, Murdoch competed for the Heavy on Wrestling title but lost to Lance Hoyt in a 3-way match. On September 7, Murdoch faced Nate Redwing in a losing effort. On January 17, 2015, Murdoch faced Derek McQuinn in a losing effort. On February 15, Murdoch lost a 3-way match against Blake Edward Belakis. On April 5, Murdoch faced Jonathan Gresham in a losing effort. On April 18, Murdoch and Leland Race faced Derek McQuinn and Steve Fender in the semi-finals tag team tournament that ended in a no contest. Mueller announced his retirement from wrestling in 2018.

=== National Wrestling Alliance (2018–2026) ===
==== NWA National Heavyweight Champion (2019–2021) ====
Murdoch came out of retirement in 2019 and appeared at the first taping for NWA Powerrr. In his first match, he lost to Ricky Starks. He interrupted Starks' post-match interview and congratulated him, establishing himself as a face. Later, he cut his own promo, stating that he wished to earn an NWA contract. He would then be victorious in matches against Jocephus and Caleb Konley, and lose in a competitive outing against reigning NWA World's Heavyweight Champion Nick Aldis in a non-title match. Murdoch entered in the tournament for the vacant NWA World Television Championship after defeating Thom Latimer in a qualifying match. On January 24, 2020, at Hard Times, Murdoch defeated The Question Mark in the first round, Dan Maff in the semifinals, before losing to Ricky Starks in the finals.

On January 25 episode of Powerrr, Murdoch and Aron Stevens fought to a 10-minute time limit draw for the NWA National Heavyweight Championship. On September 29, 2020, Murdoch defeated Aron Stevens to win the NWA National Heavyweight Championship. On February 27, 2021, Murdoch successfully defended his title in his first title defense against Jeremy Wyatt. On March 21, 2021, at Back For The Attack, Murdoch successfully defended the NWA National Championship against Chris Adonis. On the March 30 episode of Powerrr, Murdoch lost the NWA National Championship to Adonis in a no disqualification match, ending his reign at 182 days.

==== NWA Worlds Heavyweight Champion (2021–2022) ====
Following the end of his National championship reign, Murdoch won a No. 1 Contender's battle royal to face NWA Worlds Heavyweight Champion Nick Aldis at When Our Shadows Fall, but was unsuccessful at the event. Murdoch would defeat Aldis at NWA 73rd Anniversary Show on August 29 to win the title in a match where he would have to retire if he lost. On November 9 in the second part of NWA Power: By Any Means Necessary, Murdoch was attacked by debuting Mike Knox. On November 16 episode of Powerrr, it was announced that Murdoch would face Knox for the NWA Worlds Heavyweight Championship at Hard Times 2. On December 4 at Hard Times 2, Murdoch successfully defended his title in his first title defense against Knox.

On February 12, 2022, Murdoch lost the NWA World's Heavyweight Championship to Matt Cardona in Oak Grove, Kentucky, at NWA PowerrrTrip, bringing Murdoch's championship reign to an end after 167 days. On June 11 at Alwayz Ready, Murdoch regained the title, which Cardona vacated due to injury, in a fatal four-way match against Aldis, Thom Latimer, and Sam Shaw. On August 28 at NWA 74th Anniversary Show, Murdoch successfully defended his title in his first title defense against Tyrus. Murdoch lost the title to Tyrus at Hard Times 3 in a three-way match on November 12, which also featured Matt Cardona, ending his second reign at 154 days.

==== Alliance with Mike Knox (2023–2026) ====
On the March 21 episode of NWA Powerrr, Murdoch took on Daisy Kill and Talos in a Handicap match, Kill and Talos ganged up on Murdoch, Mike Knox made the save and the referee called for the bell. On April 7 at NWA 312 Pre-Show, Murdoch and Knox defeated Daisy Kill and Talos. On the April 25 episode of NWA Powerrr, Murdoch and Knox defeated The Fixers (Jay Bradley & Wrecking Ball Legursky) in a Crockett Cup 2023 qualifying match. Murdoch and Knox defeated Magnum Muscle (Dak Draper and Mims) in the second round, The Mortons (Ricky Morton and Kerry Morton) in the quarterfinal, The Midnight Riders (Tyrus and Chris Adonis) in the semifinal and Blunt Force Trauma (Carnage and Damage) in the tournament final, winning the Crockett Cup.

On September 3, 2024, at NWA Back to the Territories, Murdoch and Knox defeated Blunt Force Trauma (Carnage and Damage) to win the NWA World Tag Team Championship for the first time. They held the titles until the NWA 77th Anniversary Show, which aired on November 18, 2025, during which they lost to The Immortals (Kratos and Odinson).

=== Second retirement (2026) ===
On April 5, 2026, following a singles match against Pretty Boy Smooth at the 2026 Crockett Cup, Murdoch announced that he would be retiring from in-ring competition. He plans to stay active behind the scenes with World League Wrestling and Harley Race's Wrestling Academy.

On the June 27 episode of NWA Powerrr (taped April 25), Murdoch revealed he suckered the fans into thinking he was retiring just to hear their praises, and then said he didn't need them any more. Tag team partner Mike Knox presented him with a cape and crown and Murdoch began to refer to himself as King Trevor Murdoch (an homage to his mentor Harley Race's gimmick nearly 40 years prior in WWF).

== Other media ==
Mueller appeared as Trevor Murdoch as a playable character in two video games: WWE SmackDown vs. Raw 2007 and WWE SmackDown vs. Raw 2009.

== Personal life ==
Mueller has two sons and is the stepfather to his wife's daughter from a previous relationship.

Mueller has a tattoo of the Looney Tunes character The Tasmanian Devil on his right upper biceps. Mueller spends time at the Harley Race's Wrestling Academy working with new and upcoming wrestlers in the training program.

He and his wife, Amanda, owned T. Murdock's Bar and Grill in downtown Eldon, Missouri, which he sold in December 2013.

In an April 2014 interview for WWE's website in their "Where Are They Now?" series, Mueller said he currently was a big rig southern truck driver.

== Championships and accomplishments ==
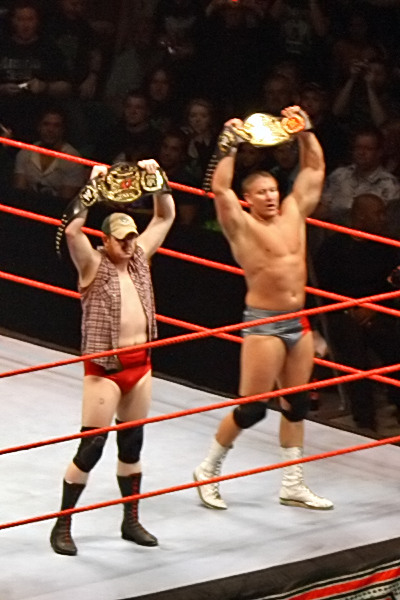
Murdoch (left) and Lance Cade were three-time World Tag Team Champions in WWE.

- Cauliflower Alley Club
  - Future Legend Award (2009)
- Metro Pro Wrestling
  - MPW Television Championship (1 time)
- National Wrestling Alliance
  - NWA World's Heavyweight Championship (2 times)
  - NWA World Tag Team Championship (1 time) - with Mike Knox
  - NWA National Championship (1 time)
  - Crockett Cup (2023) – with Mike Knox
  - NWA Champions Series Tournament (2021) – with Team Pope/Sky (Jax Dane, Jennacide, The Masked Mystery Man, and Colby Corino)
  - Second NWA Triple Crown Champion
  - NWA Year End Awards
    - Tag Team of the Year (2025) with Mike Knox
- NWA Total Nonstop Action
  - Dupp Cup (1 time) – with Bo Dupp
- Pro Wrestling Illustrated
  - Ranked No. 75 of the top 500 singles wrestlers in the PWI 500 in 2022
- WildKat Wrestling
  - WildKat Sports Heavyweight Championship (1 time)
- World League Wrestling
  - WLW Heavyweight Championship (5 times)
  - WLW Tag Team Championship (3 times) – with Bull Schmitt (1) and Wade Chism (2)
- World Wrestling Entertainment
  - World Tag Team Championship (3 times) – with Lance Cade
- World Wrestling Xpress
  - WWX Heavyweight Championship (1 time)
  - WWX United States Championship (1 time)
