= Thom Latimer =

English professional wrestler (born 1986)

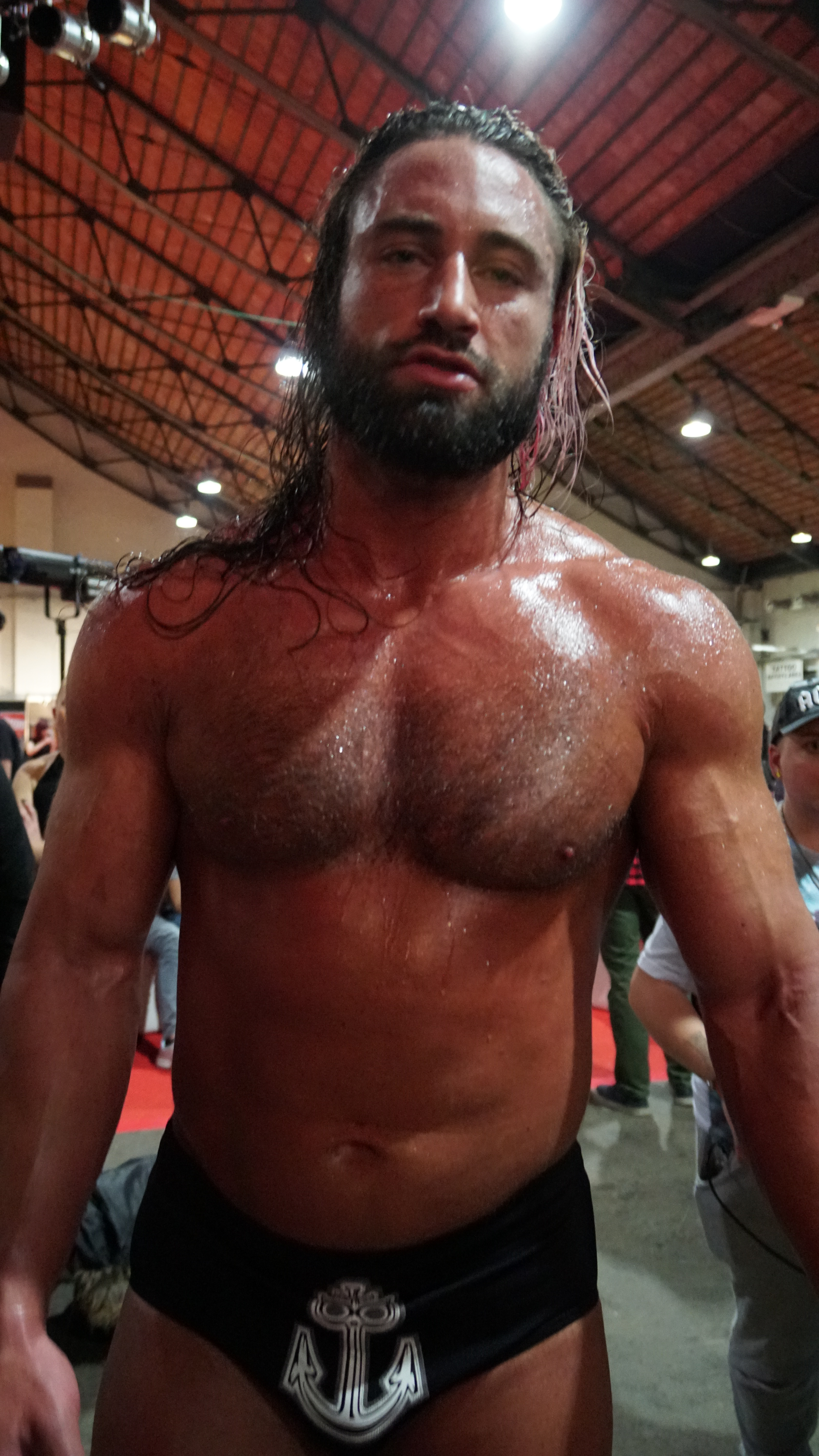
- Bram in 2017

Personal information
- Born: Thomas Raymond Latimer; 6 August 1986 (age 40) Chesterfield, Derbyshire, England
- Spouses: Charlotte Flair (m. 2012; div. 2015) Kamille (m. 2022)

Professional wrestling career
- Ring name(s): Bram; Brandon T Brendon Fraser; Kenneth Cameron; Thom Latimer; Tom Savage
- Billed height: 6 ft 3 in (1.91 m)
- Billed weight: 238 lb (108 kg)
- Billed from: Chesterfield, England; Harrogate, England; King's Lynn, England
- Trained by: Drew McDonald; Jeff Kaye
- Debut: 2003

Thomas Raymond Latimer (born 6 August 1986) is an English professional wrestler and actor. He is signed to the National Wrestling Alliance (NWA), where he is a former one-time NWA Worlds Heavyweight Champion, one-time NWA National Heavyweight Champion, one-time NWA World Television Champion and one-time NWA World Tag Team Champion.

Latimer began his career in 2002, working on the independent circuit of UK. In 2010, he was signed by WWE, where he was assigned to the developmental territory Florida Championship Wrestling. In FCW, he changed his name to Kenneth Cameron and was part of the stable The Ascension. He was released from WWE in 2012. From 2014 to 2017, Latimer worked for Total Nonstop Action Wrestling under the ring name Bram, where he is a former one-time TNA King of the Mountain Champion.

== Professional wrestling career ==
=== Early career (2002–2010) ===
Latimer was born in August 1986 at Chesterfield Royal Hospital in Chesterfield, Derbyshire, Although Latimer didn't grow up watching professional wrestling, he then discovered a video recording of WrestleMania VIII and later the 1998 King of the Ring and from then on in he was hooked on wrestling. Latimer initially debuted in wrestling as a referee in 2002 and eventually began to wrestle with only a little prior training. He began wrestling in a small promotion called SCW which later became SWWA in Birmingham where he wrestled as Tom Savage until 2005 when he moved to Harrogate and joined a wrestling school in Leeds run by World of Sport veteran Jeff Kaye. He changed his name to Brendon Fraser at a festival called the Bulldog Bash. Later in 2005 before a squash match WWE wanted him to change his name, therefore he changed Brendon to Brandon and because he was nicknamed T at Jeff Kaye's wrestling school he put the two together to become Brandon T. In said squash match he teamed up with fellow Jeff Kaye wrestling school member, Chris Chaos to take on Snitsky and Tyson Tomko on Heat on 21 November 2005. Latimer debuted for All Star Wrestling on 7 July 2008, losing to Drew McDonald. He spent most of the remaining decade wrestling for ASW until he signed a contract with the WWE. His last match was a tag team over the top rope elimination match, in which he teamed with Kid Cool, Shadow Phoenix and Tony Spitfire and lost to Dave Mastiff, Mikey Whiplash, Rampage Brown and Spud.

=== World Wrestling Entertainment / WWE (2010–2012) ===
Latimer signed with WWE in late 2010 and debuted at WWE's developmental territory Florida Championship Wrestling (FCW) on 20 January 2011 as Kenneth Cameron. He teamed with fellow British debutant Monty Lynch in a losing effort against the FCW Florida Tag Team Champions Damien Sandow and Titus O'Neil in a non-title bout. The pair won their first match in FCW a week later against Jacob Novak and an unknown wrestler. Cameron's first few television appearances came in the form of losing to established FCW talent such as Brodus Clay.

On 28 August 2011, Ricardo Rodriguez announced the formation of a stable called The Ascension, with members including Cameron, Conor O'Brian, Tito Colon, and Raquel Diaz. On 30 September, Cameron and Colon had a shot at the FCW Tag Team Championship but lost to the current champions of CJ Parker and Donny Marlow. By October, however, the Ascension was no longer associated with Rodriguez, as video packages promoting the Ascension in new supernatural dark characters only featured the other four Ascension members. By the end of November, the Ascension had all but disbanded. Cameron continued to use the Ascension gimmick during his appearances. Cameron went on a three-month singles winning streak beating the likes of Jiro and Calvin Raines until he finally lost to Colin Cassady on 23 February 2012. On 15 March 2012 Cameron was accompanied to the ring by the returning Conor O'Brian in his match against Byron Saxton, the match ended in disqualification when O'Brian interfered. Cameron and O'Brian began wrestling as a tag team using the name The Ascension, and on 23 March the two defeated Jason Jordan and Xavier Woods. The Ascension suffered their first loss when the pair lost to the FCW Tag Team Champions, Corey Graves and Jake Carter, in a title bout. After this loss the Ascension went on another winning streak included defeating Adam Mercer and Chad Baxter, Jason Jordan and Mike Dalton, Brad Maddox and Rick Victor in a fatal four-way elimination match.

When WWE rebranded its developmental territory, FCW, into NXT Wrestling, Cameron and O'Brian (wrestling as the Ascension) debuted on the 20 June 2012 episode of the rebooted of NXT taped at Full Sail University, where they defeated Mike Dalton and CJ Parker. The Ascension then started a feud with The Usos, defeating them on the 5 September NXT, and also scored a win over Justin Gabriel and Tyson Kidd on the 3 October NXT. Two weeks later, the Ascension teamed up with Kassius Ohno to defeat Richie Steamboat and The Usos.

Latimer was officially released from his NXT contract by the WWE on 30 November 2012 after being charged with battery of a law enforcement officer and disorderly intoxication in St. Petersburg, Florida. Latimer had previously been arrested in January 2011 for driving under the influence.

=== Independent circuit (2013–present) ===
After his release from his NXT contract by the WWE and his 90-day non-compete clause expired, Latimer began competing on the independent circuit while reusing the Kenneth Cameron ring name and The Ascension gimmick, as he lost to Tommy Taylor at an NWA Florida Underground Wrestling event on 9 February 2013. He made his debut for World Xtreme Wrestling on the 27 February episode of WXW Rage where he lost to CJ Doyle. Cameron would wrestle at Full Impact Pro Establish Dominance and defeated Johnny Vandal. After the match, Larry Dallas, who was at ringside with Scott Reed, Trina Michaels and Buggy Nova offered Cameron a spot with The Scene, which Cameron turned down. Vandal then attacked Cameron and asked to join The Scene. On the 3 April episode of WXW Rage, after defeating Tony Torres, Kenneth came out to the ring and demanded a shot at the recently vacated WXW Television Championship which he got after laying out Doyle. He would go on to lose to Doyle. At FIP Ascension, Cameron would team up with Tommy Taylor to take on new Scene members, the Bravado Brothers (Harlem and Lance), which they lost after interference by the Scene. At FUW Throwdown 2, Cameron took on Bruce Santee in a match for the NWA FUW Bruiserweight Championship, which he would lose. At FUW Throwdown 3, Cameron helped Rule Britannia (Andreas Rossi and Tommy Taylor) defeat JD Maverick and James Alexander after interfering in their match and also becoming the third member of Rule Britannia. On 9 June at an FUW event, Cameron was defeated by Michael Tarver in a NWA FUW Heavyweight Championship match. On 1 September FUW TV tapings, Cameron defeated Tommy Taylor, after the match, both men shook hands in a sign of respect for each other. At FUW Throwdown 7, Cameron took on Kahagas for the NWA North American Heavyweight Championship and lost. On 20 December 2014, Cameron defeated Valkabious to win the EPW World Heavyweight Championship. On 19 January 2018, Bram entered the annual Discovery Wrestling Disco Derby match which was won by Andy Wild. On 15 February 2023, Latimer defeated Dread King Logan for the IWR World Heavyweight Championship.

=== Total Nonstop Action Wrestling ===
==== Teaming and feuding with Magnus (2014–2015) ====
On 11 April 2014, Latimer had a TNA tryout before One Night Only: X-Travaganza II. On the 1 May 2014 episode of Impact Wrestling, Latimer debuted as Bram in a backstage segment with Magnus where he would chastise his kayfabe childhood friend, claiming he had "gone soft." Bram would make his in ring debut on the 15 May episode of Impact Wrestling, where he and Magnus would lose to Willow in a handicap match. During the match and those that preceded it, Bram would encourage Magnus to let out a more intense side and use weapons but Magnus would refuse. On the 29 May episode of Impact Wrestling, Bram quickly defeated Tigre Uno in his first singles match and would proceed to beat down Uno after the match only to be stopped by Magnus. On the 5 June episode of Impact Wrestling, Bram lost to Willow by disqualification following interference by Magnus after he attacked Willow with a steel pry bar. Following Slammiversary XII, Bram and Magnus lost a TNA World Tag Team Championship match against The Wolves after a chair shot from Magnus, on the 19 June episode of Impact Wrestling; they continued to beat the champions until Willow and Abyss made the save. On the 26 June episode of Impact Wrestling, Bram and Magnus defeated Willow and Abyss in a Monster's Ball match. On the 10 July episode of Impact Wrestling, Bram and Magnus have another chance to win the titles against The Wolves, but were defeated. On 20 August, at Hardcore Justice, Bram defeated Abyss in a Stairway to Janice Match. He then injured his hand during the match and later had surgery to repair it. On the 22 October episode of Impact Wrestling, Bram declared himself the new "King of Hardcore" and would go on to feud with hardcore legends, including Devon and the "Innovator of Violence" Tommy Dreamer.

On the 23 January 2015 episode of Impact Wrestling, Bram competed in the Feast or Fired match, after which he argued with his tagteam partner Magnus, who had grabbed the final case later revealed to have contained a TNA World Tag Team Championship match. The following week Bram attacked Magnus backstage, effectively and officially ending their partnership. They would continue to attack each other, with Bram even threatening Mickie James—Magnus' wife. The feud culminated in a No DQ match, which Magnus won. On the 17 April episode of Impact Wrestling, Bram teamed with Ethan Carter III in a tournament for the vacant TNA World Tag Team Championship. They defeated Tigre Uno and Jay Rios in the first round, but they failed to win the titles in an Ultimate X match, which The Hardys won.

==== King of the Mountain Champion (2015–2016) ====
Bram would then appear in vignettes about his hatred of everyone and everything, attacking cameramen and backstage officials. At Destination X, he would then cut a promo stating he would "rewrite history" and challenged any TNA wrestler from the past to a No Holds Barred match. Crimson would answer the challenge and be defeated by Bram. The following week, he defeated Joseph Park. On the 24 June 2015 episode of Impact Wrestling, Bram lost to Vader by disqualification. After the match, Bram was attacked by a returning Matt Morgan. At Slammiversary XIII, Bram defeated Matt Morgan in a Street Fight. Later he debuted a feud against Mr. Anderson. Bram was defeated twice by Anderson : one time at No Surrender and once again at Turning Point in an Open Mic Challenge, which they officially ended the feud. On 31 August 2015, Bram was suspended indefinitely due to his domestic battery arrest and felony charges of false imprisonment. On the 16 September episode of Impact Wrestling, Bram was revealed as the final team member for Team TNA in TNA vs GFW's Lethal Lockdown match, which his team won. On the 23 September episode of Impact Wrestling, Bram lost a five-way match against Drew Galloway, Davey Richards, Eddie Edwards and Lashley, to determine the number one contender to the TNA World Championship at Bound for Glory. Bram's suspension was lifted on 19 October when all of the charges against him were dropped. Following his return, Bram took part in the TNA World Title Series and he placed second of his block by defeating Rockstar Spud and Grado and losing to Drew Galloway, receiving 6 points to advance to the round of 16, where he lost to Davey Richards therefore being eliminated from the tournament.

In January 2016, Bram then formed a tag team with Eric Young, by viciously attacking Jeff Hardy during his match against Matt Hardy, on the 26 January episode of Impact Wrestling. They began feuding with Beer Money, Inc., after James Storm saved Bobby Roode from an attack of the duo. At TNA One Night Only, they were defeated by Beer Money. A rematch happened at Lockdown, but they were defeated once again, thus ending the feud. On the 23 March episode of Impact Wrestling, Bram and Eric Young were defeated by The BroMans. On the 12 April episode of Impact Wrestling, they were defeated by Beer Money, in a match for the TNA World Tag Team Championship, also including Decay and The BroMans. During these match, Bram unintentionally hit Young.

On the 19 April episode of Impact Wrestling, Young would attack Bram and ending their alliance, turning him into a face in the process. The following week at Sacrifice, Bram defeated Eric Young in a Falls Count Anywhere match to become the new TNA King of the Mountain Champion, claiming his first title win within TNA. He would then lose the title to Eli Drake on 31 May, after an attack of Lashley, ending his reign at 35 days. He had a rematch at Slammiversary, but he was defeated by Eli Drake and failed to become a two-time King of the Mountain Champion. Shortly after losing the title, Bram entered a storyline with Decay, where Rosemary kissed him backstage. At Destination X, Bram defeated Abyss after an interference of Rosemary. The romantic storyline ended after Rosemary lured Bram to a secluded area where he was abducted by Decay.

==== Death Crew Council and departure (2016–2017) ====
In October, Bram turned heel once again as a member of Death Crew Council. The DCC made their Impact Zone debut on the 20 October episode of Impact Wrestling, when they attacked The Tribunal, following the latter's loss to TNA World Tag Team Champions, The Broken Hardys. The DCC continued their assault on TNA wrestlers, attacking Robbie E and Grado on the 27 October episode of Impact Wrestling. On the 3 November episode of Impact Wrestling, the DCC attacked the TNA World Tag Team Champions, The Broken Hardys. As the faction was leaving, the Hardy's challenged them to an immediate match and put their titles on the line; whether this was a handicap match or not and what its official result was have never been specified. The match devolved into a backstage fight during which Matt Hardy suffered amnesia after being knocked off a forklift by one of the DCC members. The DCC unmasked themselves the following Impact episode after laying out TNA World Heavyweight Champion Eddie Edwards following his successful title defense against Eli Drake. On the 17 November episode of Impact Wrestling, the group defeated Edwards and Brother Nero in a No Disqualification 3-on-2 handicap match. The following week on the Thanksgiving episode of Impact Wrestling, Bram made his singles in-ring return defeating Brother Nero in a No Disqualification match following interference from Storm & Kingston. On the 1 December episode of Impact Wrestling, Bram and Kingston faced The Broken Hardys for the TNA Tag Team Championship, but were ultimately defeated. On the 5 January 2017 episode of Impact Wrestling, the DCC attacked Decay after their victory over The Helms Dynasty, when Storm and Bram ambushed them by smashing beer bottles over Abyss and Crazzy Steve's heads, with Bram issuing a threat to Rosemary afterwards.[2] On the 6 January One Night Only: Live! PPV, Abyss and Crazzy Steve would ambush the DCC after Storm's victory over Jessie Godderz, misting Storm and Bram, incapacitating them while Abyss laid out Kingston with a chokeslam.

On the 12 January edition of Impact Wrestling, Bram revealed that he joined the DCC to get revenge on Decay for their prior attack and abduction in 2016. Bram and Kingston would face Decay in a losing effort, after James Storm attacked Abyss, resulting in a disqualification. At Genesis, the DCC were defeated by Decay and The Broken Hardys in a three-way tag team, thus not winning their TNA World Tag Team Championship. On the 19 January episode of Impact Wrestling, Bram and Kingston competed in the first ever Race for the Case, capturing the yellow briefcase when Kingston knocked it out of Jessie Godderz's hands and into Bram's, later learning they have the #2 call out spot for the 2 February Open Fight Night episode of Impact Wrestling. On the 2 February episode of Impact Wrestling, the DCC used their Race for the Case briefcase to call out and defeat Decay in a Fall Count Anywhere match. At the end of the show, they would attack Ethan Carter III after his match against Eli Drake, only to attack him and his bodyguard Tyrus after. On the 9 February episode of Impact Wrestling, the DCC defeated Eli Drake and Tyrus in a handicap match. James Storm was interrupted by Kingston and Bram as Kingston spit in Storm's face, and Storm laid both guys out with superkicks, turning him face.

On 7 November 2017, Latimer officially announced on his official Twitter account that he had departed Impact Wrestling.

=== Pro Wrestling Noah (2017) ===
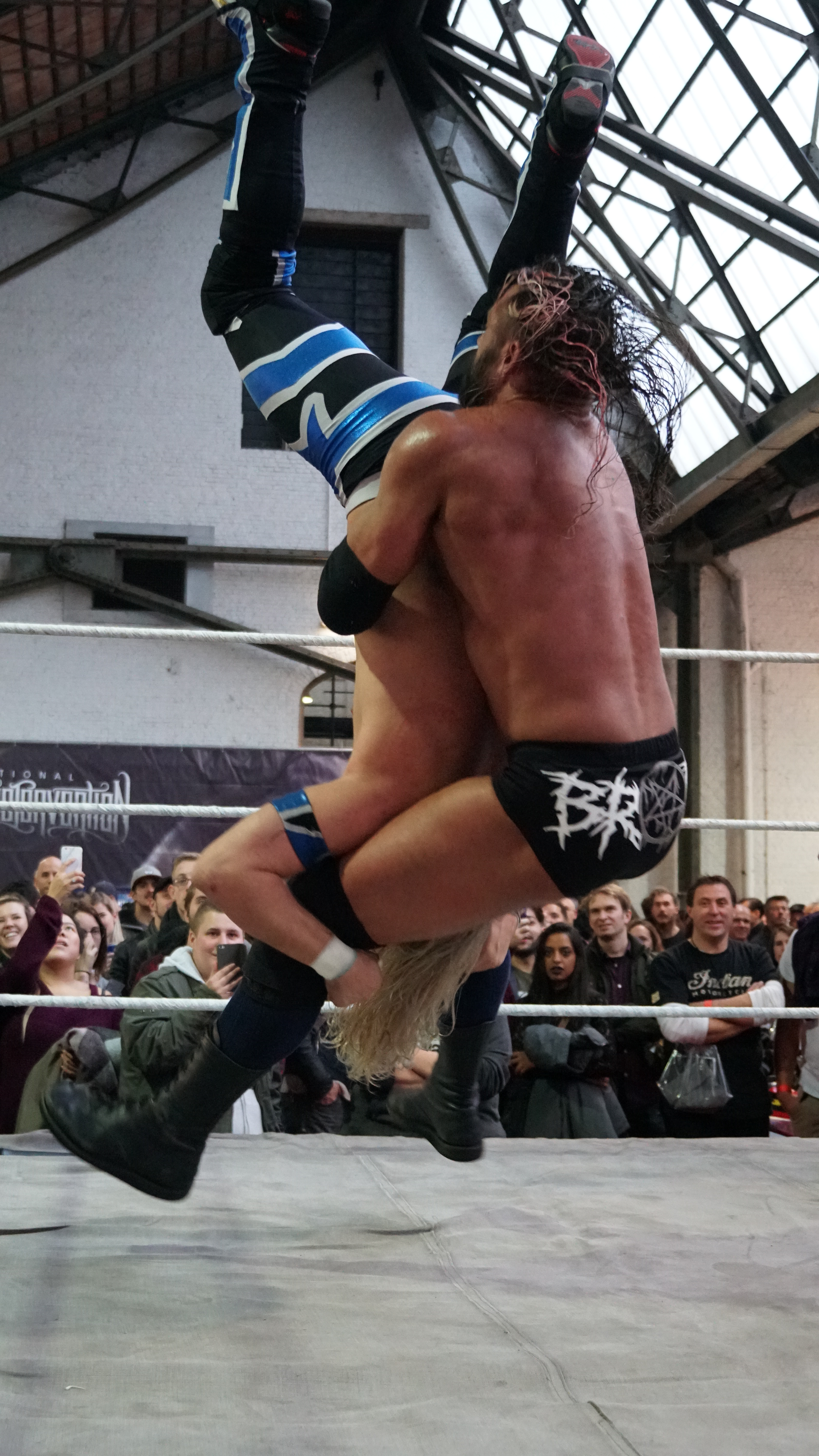
Lattimer performing Dante's Inferno on Glen Alexander at an independent show in 2017.

On 25 March, it was announced that Bram would be taking part in Pro Wrestling Noah's annual Global Tag League, teaming with Robbie E to represent Impact Wrestling. On 26 April, Bram was officially suspended by Pro Wrestling Noah for inappropriate behavior in public, pertaining to an Instagram post.

=== Insane Championship Wrestling (2015–2018) ===
Bram made his in-ring debut for ICW on Barramania 2015 as part of The 55 defeating Grado, Joe Hendry, Kenny Williams and Noam Dar. At ICW Waynestock, Bram was defeated by Grado. In March 2016 Bram unsuccessfully challenge Big Damo for the ICW World Heavyweight Championship. Bram later joined the stable The Black Label, at Shug's Hoose Party 3 Bram was defeated by DCT. At Fear & Loathing IX, Team Black Label (Bram, Drew Galloway, Jack Jester & Kid Fite) were defeated by Team Dallas (Grado, Chris Renfrew, DCT & Sha Samuels) for the ownership of ICW. At ICW Eleven, Bram defeated Jody Fleisch. At ICW Fear & Loathing X, Bram won a seven-man ladder match getting an opportunity for the ICW Zero-G Championship and the ICW World Heavyweight Championship, both held by BT Gunn. Bram cashed his opportunity at ICW 7th Annual Square Go!, but lost the match.

=== National Wrestling Alliance (2019–present) ===
==== Strictly Business; championship reigns (2019–2023) ====
On 27 April, at the Crockett Cup, Latimer and Royce Isaacs won a tag team battle royal to qualify to the 2019 Crockett Cup. Later that night they defeated The War Kings (Crimson and Jax Dane) in the first round and Bandido and Flip Gordon in the semi-finals before being defeated by Villain Enterprises in the final. On 7 September, Latimer and his partner Royce Isaacs defeated Villain Enterprises for the NWA World Tag Team Championship at Ring of Honors Global Wars event. However, they lost the titles against The Rock N Roll Express during the October 1, 2019 TV tapings. After failing to regain the championships at NWA Into the Fire and NWA Hard Times, Latimer entered to the tournament for the vacant NWA World Television Championship being defeated by Trevor Murdoch in the first round. After this, Latimer formed an alliance with his real life girlfriend Kamille and his former partner the NWA World Heavyweight Champion Nick Aldis. On the January 2020 tapings of NWA Powerrr, Latimer defeated former NWA World Heavyweight Champion Tim Storm.

On June 11, 2022 at Alwayz Ready, Latimer competed in a fatal four-way match for the vacant NWA World's Heavyweight Championship against Trevor Murdoch, Nick Aldis, and Sam Shaw; the bout was won by Murdoch. After a brief feud with Fodder, Latimer defeated Jordan Clearwater to win the NWA World Television title, on the February 14, 2023 episode of NWA Powerrr, marking his first singles championship in his NWA career. Latimer successfully defended his title in his first title defense against Rhett Titus, on the March 14 episode of NWA Powerrr. On June 3, during night one of the Crockett Cup, Latimer teamed with Rhett Titus under the name "A Cut Above" to compete in the namesake tournament, losing to The Brothers Of Funstruction (Ruffo The Clown and Yabo The Clown) in the second round. The next night, Latimer unsuccessfully challenged EC3 for the NWA National Championship.

During Latimer and Adonis' match against Knox and Murdoch on the August 22, 2023 episode of Powerrr, Adonis turned on Latimer and attacked him, thus giving Knox and Murdoch the victory. At NWA 75th Anniversary Show, Latimer retained the NWA World Television Championship against Adonis. On the September 5 episode of Powerrr, Latimer was challenged by EC3 to invoke his "Lucky Seven Rule" and face him for the world title. The following week, Latimer and Kamille confronted EC3, with the former officially relinquishing the television title for his world title opportunity at NWA Samhain. On the event, Latimer unsuccessfully challenged EC3 for the NWA World's Heavyweight Championship.

==== NWA Worlds Heavyweight Champion (2024–2025) ====
On March 2, 2024 at Hard Times, Latimer won the vacant NWA National Championship after defeating Blake "Bulletproof" Troop, Paul Burchill and Cyon in a four-way match. Latimer vacated the NWA National Championship to challenge for the NWA World's Heavyweight Championship at NWA 76th Anniversary Show. On August 31 at NWA 76th Anniversary Show, Latimer defeated EC3 to win the NWA World's Heavyweight Championship for the first time in his career. At Hard Times V, Latimer successfully defended the NWA World's Heavyweight Championship against Carson Bartholomew Drake. As he was celebrating, the lights went out; when they came back on, he was confronted by Rhino. At Crockett Cup on May 19, 2025, Latimer defeated both Rhino and Colby Corino to retain the title. On August 16, 2025 at NWA 77th Anniversary Show, Latimer lost the NWA Worlds Heavyweight Championship to "Thrillbilly" Silas Mason.

== Personal life ==
He was married to fellow professional wrestler Ashley Fliehr, who performs in WWE as Charlotte Flair. On 30 August 2015, Latimer was arrested in Gulfport, Florida and charged with two felony counts of domestic battery by strangulation and false imprisonment. The incident did not involve Fliehr, but did involve a woman being reported as Latimer's girlfriend. Latimer was released from jail on 1 September 2015, after posting a $5,000 bond. On 19 October 2015, all charges against Latimer were dropped. On 29 October 2015, Latimer and Flair officially finalized their divorce. On 21 May 2022, he married fellow professional wrestler Kamille.

== Filmography ==
Year	Title	Character	Notes
2013	Best Buds 2D	Merch	
2013	Blind Tag	Brice Allen Mitchell	Action Film Challenge Award for Best Hero
2013	Of Dice and Men: The Musical	Barbarian	
2013	The Adventures of William Strickland: Chick Magnet	Ellison	
2014	Shovel	The Figure	As Thomas Latimer
2014	Dragons of Camelot	Bors	
2016	Crazy Lake	Henry	
2017	Check Point	McGregor	

== Championships and accomplishments ==
- Championship Entertainment Productions
  - CEP Tag Team Championship (1 time, current) – with Joe Ocasio
- Entertainment Pro Wrestling
  - EPW World Heavyweight Championship (1 time)
- German Wrestling Federation
  - Battlefield (2018)
- Insane Wrestling Revolution
  - IWR World Heavyweight Championship (2 time)
- National Wrestling Alliance
  - NWA World's Heavyweight Championship (1 time)
  - NWA National Heavyweight Championship (1 time)
  - NWA World Television Championship (1 time)
  - NWA World Tag Team Championship (1 time) – with Royce Isaacs
  - Third NWA Triple Crown Champion
- Preston City Wrestling
  - PCW Tag Team Championship (1 time) – with Danny Hope and Sheikh El Sham
- Pro Wrestling Illustrated
  - Ranked No. 44 of the top 500 singles wrestlers in the PWI 500 in 2025
- Pro Evolution Wrestling
  - Pro Evolution Heavyweight Championship (1 time)
- Pro Wrestling Pride
  - PWP Heavyweight Championship (2 times)
- Total Nonstop Action Wrestling
  - TNA King of the Mountain Championship (1 time)
  - King of the Mountain (2016)
  - Global Impact Tournament (2015) – with Team International (The Great Sanada, Drew Galloway, The Great Muta, Tigre Uno, Magnus, Rockstar Spud, Khoya, Sonjay Dutt and Angelina Love)
  - Race for the Case (2017 – Yellow Case)
- Unite X Conquer
  - UXC Pro Wrestling Pride Championship (1 time)
- Upbrawl Championship Wrestling
  - UCW Heavyweight Championship (1 time)
- World Association of Wrestling
  - WAW British Commonwealth Heavyweight Championship (1 time)
- World War Wrestling
  - WWW Heavyweight Championship (1 time)
