= Joe Galli =

American professional wrestling commentator and former news anchor

- Born: Los Angeles, California, U.S.
- Employers: WNWO-TV (early 2010s); KESQ-TV (2015–2018); KPSP-CD (2015–2018); United Wrestling Network (2018); Ring of Honor (2018); National Wrestling Alliance (2018–present); WOAI-TV (2019–2022); KABB-TV (2019–2022); River City Wrestling (2019–2024); Mission Pro Wrestling (2021); Juggalo Championship Wrestling (2024); Joe Cazana Promotions (2024–present); Texas Style Wrestling (2024–present)

Joe Galli is a professional wrestling commentator and a former news anchor and reporter who has worked with WNWO-TV, KESQ-TV, KPSP-CD, WOAI-TV, and KABB-TV. He is signed to the National Wrestling Alliance (NWA) where he serves as the Chief Operation Officer for the promotion and serves as a play-by-play commentator for the promotion's events in addition to serving as a play-by-play commentator for its territories Joe Cazana Promotions (JCP) and Texas Style Wrestling (TSW). He has also worked with the United Wrestling Network (UWN), Ring of Honor, River City Wrestling (RCW), Mission Pro Wrestling (MPW), and Juggalo Championship Wrestling (JCW).

== Career ==
In the early 2010s, Galli began working for various local television stations in Ohio with his most notable job being with the Toledo-based NBC affiliate WNWO-TV. In 2015, Galli moved to California where he received an Emmy Award for his work with KESQ-TV and KPSP-CD as a reporter and an evening news anchor. In 2018, Galli moved to San Antonio, Texas where he worked with WOAI-TV and KABB-TV in addition to beginning his work as a professional wrestling commentator for the United Wrestling Network (UWN), Ring of Honor (ROH), and the National Wrestling Alliance (NWA).

In April 2022, Joe Galli announced that he was leaving WOAI-TV and KABB-TV to work full time as a professional wrestling commentator and as the Chief Operating Officer of the NWA. On December 2, 2023, Galli made his Joe Cazana Promotions debut during the promotion's How Coalfield Stole Christmas event. During the event, the NWA announced that Joe Cazana Promotions would join the recently revived territory system. In 2024, Galli began working as a commentator for the Detroit-based professional wrestling promotion Juggalo Championship Wrestling during their Juggalos Strike Back event which was a taping for the first four episodes of JCW Lunacy. On October 30, 2024, Galli served as a play-by-play commentator for Juggalo Championship Wrestling's Devil's Night pay-per-view.
