= Tyrus (wrestler) =

American broadcaster and former wrestler (b. 1973)

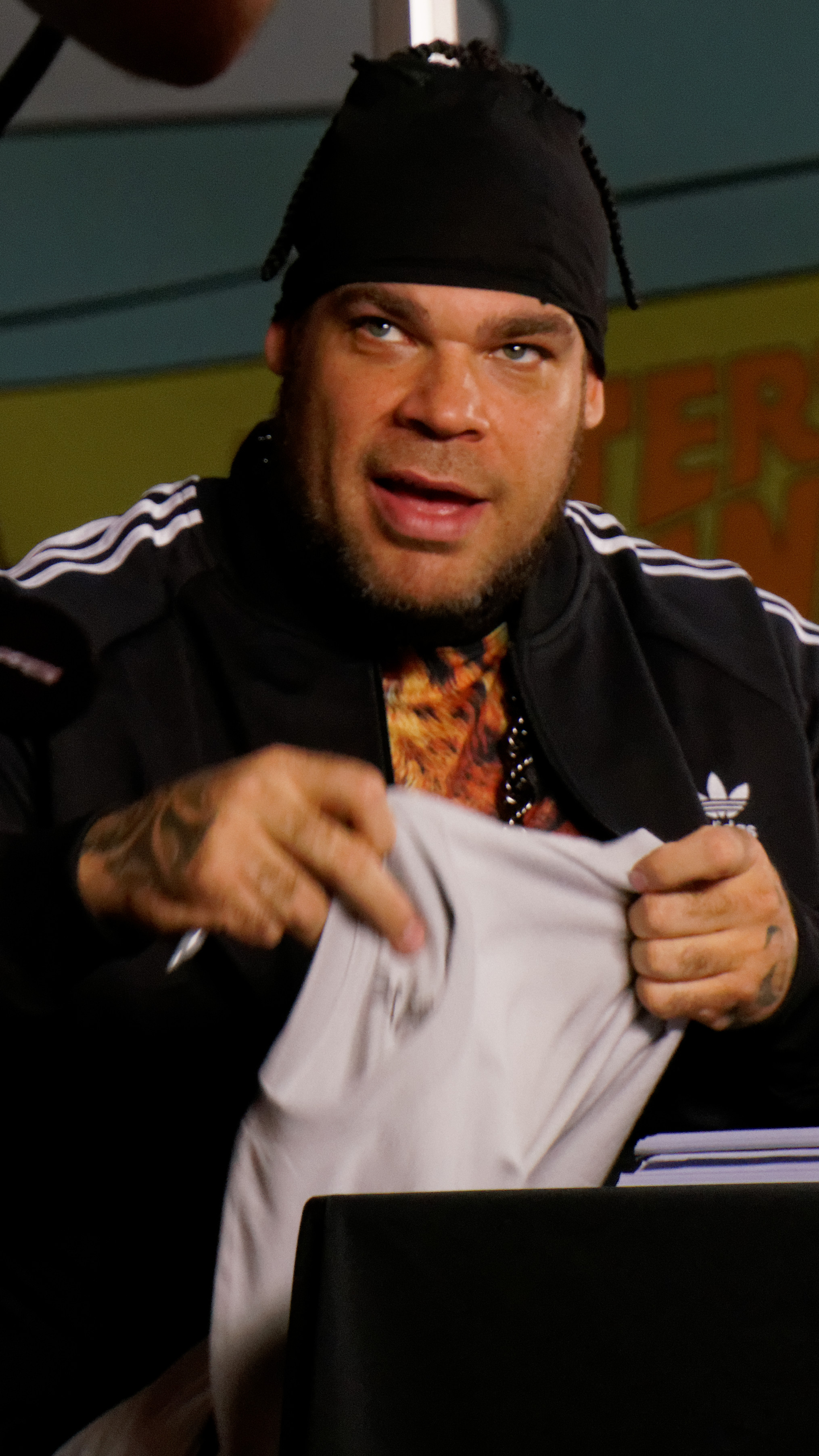
- Tyrus in 2014

Personal information
- Born: George Timothy Murdoch; February 21, 1973 (age 53) Boston, Massachusetts, U.S.
- Education: Antelope Valley College; University of Nebraska at Kearney

Professional wrestling career
- Ring name(s): Brodus Clay; G-Rilla; George Murdoch; George T. Murdoch; Monstrous BC; Tyrus
- Billed height: 6 ft 7 in (201 cm)
- Billed weight: 375 lb (170 kg)
- Billed from: The Concrete Jungle; Pasadena, California; Planet Funk
- Trained by: Deep South Wrestling; Florida Championship Wrestling
- Debut: 2006
- Retired: 2023

George Timothy Murdoch (born February 21, 1973) is an American cable news personality, author, actor, and retired professional wrestler known by his ring/stage name Tyrus. As a wrestler, he was signed to the National Wrestling Alliance (NWA), where he is a former NWA World's Heavyweight Champion. As a cable news personality, he appears on Fox News, and its sister streaming service Fox Nation, primarily as a co-host/panelist on the late-night talk show Gutfeld!, as well as a contributor/fill-in host on other programs. In 2024, Tyrus was named host of Maintaining with Tyrus on the streaming platform OutKick, which is owned by Fox.

After training in WWE's developmental territories, such as Deep South Wrestling (DSW) and Florida Championship Wrestling (FCW), Murdoch under the ring name Brodus Clay debuted during the fourth season of NXT, a WWE television show where rookies were paired with established WWE wrestlers as mentors. He debuted on the main roster as Alberto Del Rio's bodyguard. During 2012, WWE changed his gimmick to The Funkasaurus, a funk dancer accompanied by his backup dancers the Funkadactyls. He wrestled in WWE until his departure in 2014. From 2014 to 2017, Murdoch wrestled in Total Nonstop Action Wrestling (TNA) under the ring name of Tyrus. In 2021, he joined the NWA, where he won the NWA World Television Championship, and later the promotion's primary title — the World's Heavyweight Championship.

His 2022 autobiography Just Tyrus: A Memoir was a New York Times bestseller. His second book Nuff Said was released in 2023. Tyrus' third book What It Is, America was released on November 11, 2025.

== Early life ==
Murdoch is biracial; his father is black and his mother is white. He has stated that when he was born, his father was 19 years old and his mother was 15. In 2018, Murdoch disclosed a childhood incident in which his abusive father damaged his eye by hitting him; this incident led his mother to leave his father. While Murdoch's mother moved back to her parents' home, Murdoch has stated that he and his brother were not welcome there because they were part black. According to Murdoch, he and his brother lived with a foster family for many years; during this time, Murdoch was "obsessed" with changing his skin color, thinking that this would allow him to be reunited with his family. Murdoch and his brother eventually lived with their mother again, but Murdoch left home at age 15.

In 1990, Murdoch attended Quartz Hill High School in Los Angeles County, California, and then in 1992, Antelope Valley College in Lancaster. By 1995, he was attending the University of Nebraska at Kearney, where he studied to become a teacher, and played college football for the Lopers. However, Murdoch has stated that his football career ended when surgery to remove a ruptured appendix severed nerve endings in his leg, leaving him with a permanent limp.

Murdoch has worked as a bodyguard for Snoop Dogg.

== Professional wrestling career ==
=== World Wrestling Entertainment / WWE (2006-2008, 2010-2014) ===
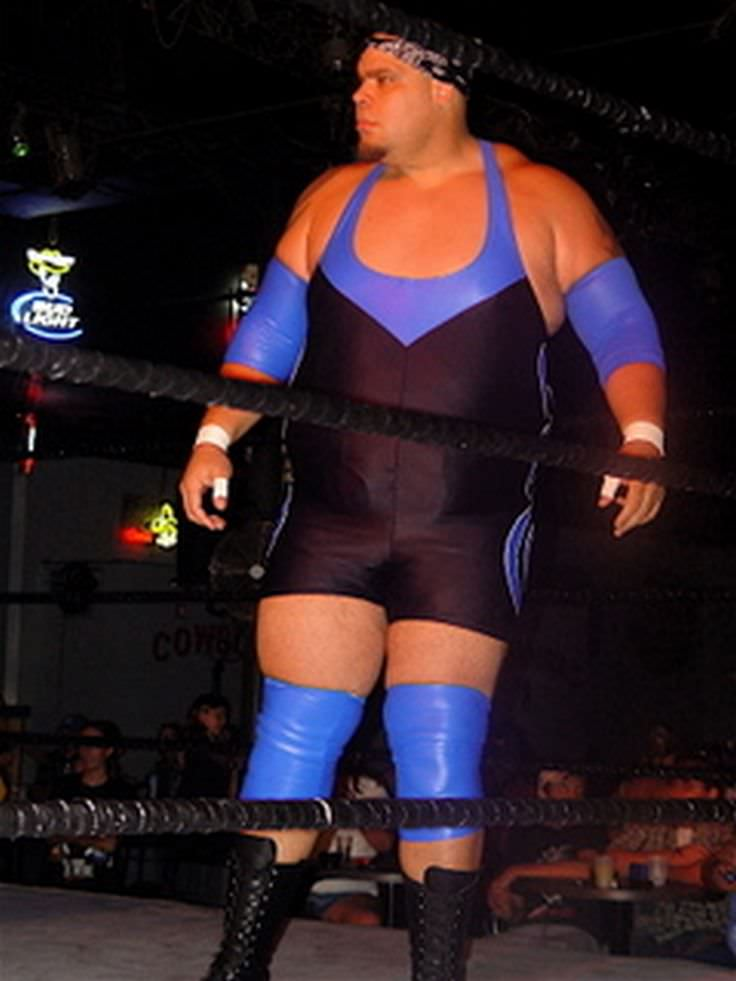
G-Rilla at an FCW event in 2007

==== Developmental territories (2006–2008) ====
After signing a contract with World Wrestling Entertainment (WWE), Murdoch was assigned to Deep South Wrestling (DSW), a WWE developmental territory, where he worked as G-Rilla, adopting the gimmick of a street thug. He worked in DSW until June 2007, when he was assigned to Florida Championship Wrestling, another WWE developmental territory. Murdoch worked in FCW, wrestling for the FCW Southern Heavyweight Championship against Harry Smith on September 25, but lost via disqualification, but he was released from his contract on February 4, 2008.

==== NXT and alliance with Alberto Del Rio (2010–2011) ====
After a two-year hiatus, in January 2010, Murdoch re-signed with WWE and returned to FCW. While he started with the G-Rilla ringname, he began to use the name of Brodus Clay, a play on Snoop Dogg's real name (Calvin Cordozar Broadus), in May 2010. During the finale of season three of NXT, Clay was named part of the fourth season, with Ted DiBiase and Maryse as his Pros. He made his in-ring debut on NXT on the December 14, 2010, episode, teaming with DiBiase to defeat Byron Saxton and his mentor Chris Masters. During the season, he won a four-way elimination match on the January 25 episode of NXT, earning the right to choose a new Pro, picking Alberto Del Rio. In the season finale, Clay ended the competition in second place, losing to Curtis.

Following his stint in NXT, on the March 7 episode of Raw, Clay debuted as Del Rio's new bodyguard. As Del Rio was feuding with Edge and Christian, Clay faced off with single matches against them and also teamed with Del Rio to face Edge & Christian. Clay accompanied Del Rio to the ring at WrestleMania XXVII for his match with Edge. On the April 25 episode of Raw, Del Rio was drafted to Raw, while Clay remained on SmackDown. Clay's final appearance with Del Rio occurred on May 1 at Extreme Rules, when he interfered on Del Rio's behalf as Del Rio faced Christian in a ladder match for the vacant World Heavyweight Championship. Despite this, Del Rio was unsuccessful in winning the match. After a three-month absence due to the filming of the movie No One Lives, Clay reappeared on the August 4, 2011, episode of Superstars, where he defeated Pat Silva. Over the next few weeks, Clay continued to squash various jobbers on Superstars.

==== The Funkasaurus (2012–2014) ====
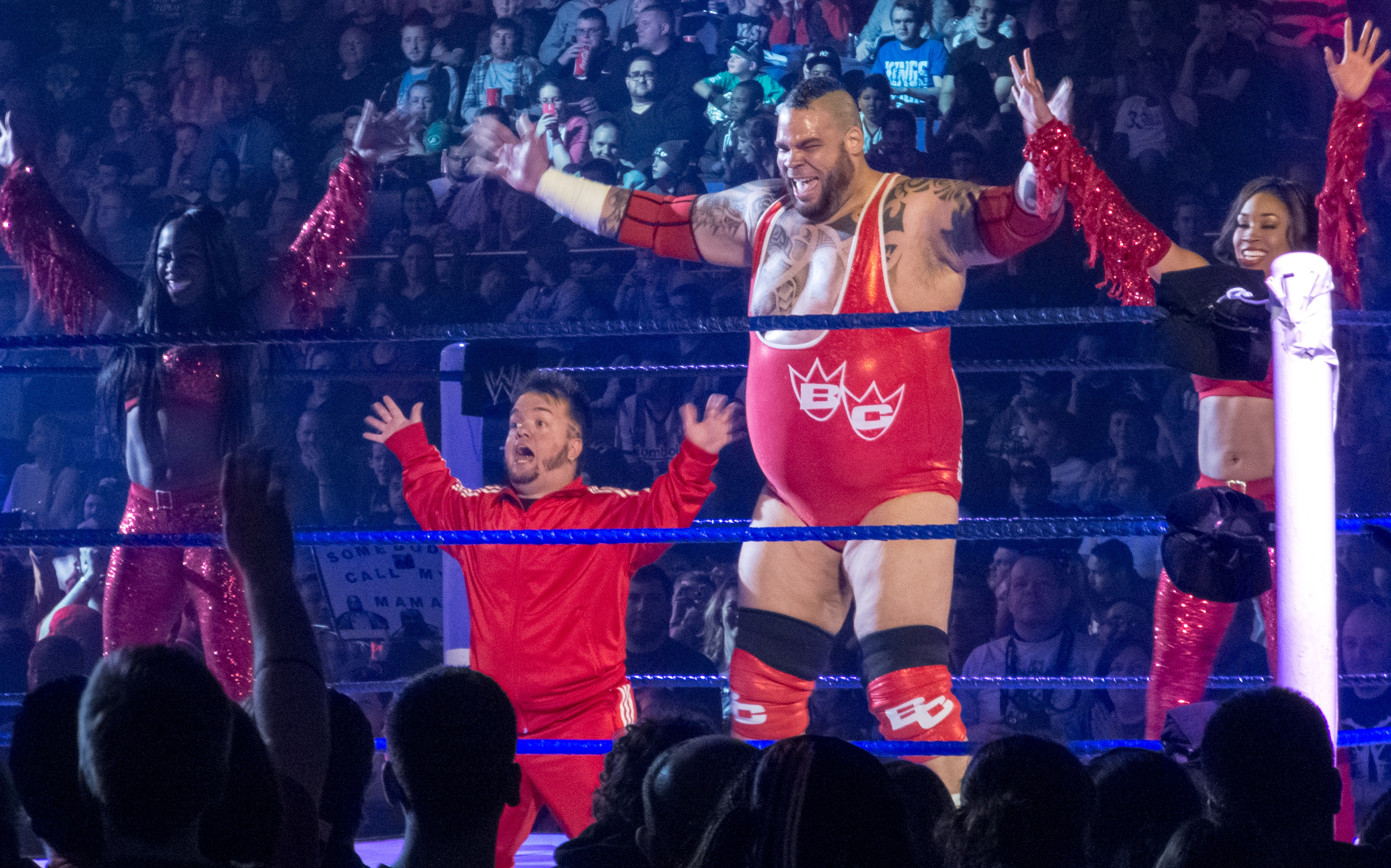
Clay as the Funkasaurus with The Funkadactyls (Naomi and Cameron), and Hornswoggle dancing

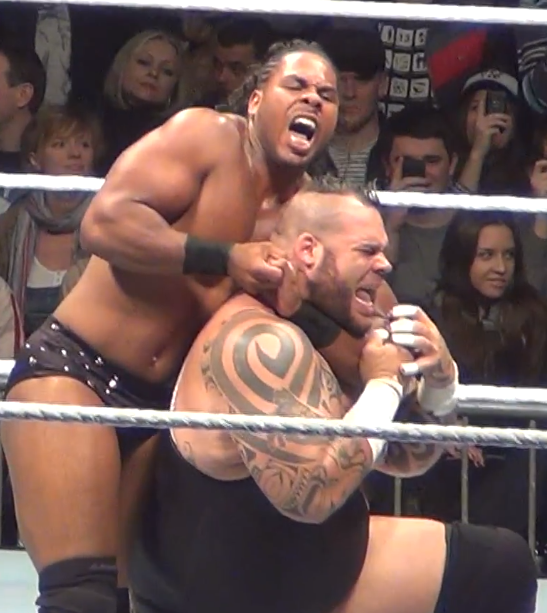
Clay wrestling JTG in 2012

WWE ran vignettes promoting his return to television on the November 7, 2011, episode of Raw. However, Clay's television return was continuously delayed by authority figure John Laurinaitis to be "next week", with this trend continuing all the way into January 2012. Around this time, Clay was informed by management that he would be portraying a dancing face character upon his return. He was hesitant to follow through with their request, but gained the confidence to try it with encouragement from Dusty Rhodes. Clay made his television return on the January 9, 2012, episode of Raw as a face (heroic character) with a fun-loving, funk dancing gimmick, with the nickname "The Funkasaurus" and began using Ernest "The Cat" Miller's theme song "Somebody Call My Momma". Now accompanied by The Funkadactyls (Naomi and Cameron) and announced as hailing from "Planet Funk", Clay incorporated gyrations and dance moves into his various squash wins on both Raw and SmackDown. Clay made his pay-per-view singles debut at the Royal Rumble on January 29, quickly defeating Drew McIntyre.

At WrestleMania XXVIII, Clay made an on-stage appearance, calling and dancing with Momma Clay. The following night on Raw, Clay started a feud with Dolph Ziggler and Jack Swagger when he saved Santino Marella from them. Clay and Marella beat Ziggler and Swagger on the April 9 episode of Raw. On the April 20 episode of SmackDown, Clay began a brief association with Hornswoggle. At Extreme Rules, Clay defeated Ziggler. By May, Clay was on a 21-match winning streak since adopting the Funkasaurus gimmick.

On the May 28 episode of Raw, Big Show, now a villain, blamed Clay for dancing in the ring just moments after Big Show was crying after getting fired. Hearing this, Clay then challenged Big Show to a match that night. Before the match could start, Big Show attacked Clay at ringside and brutally assaulted him. On the June 8 episode of SmackDown, Clay was banned by General Manager John Laurinaitis from appearing on Raw "to protect him from Big Show" so he was transferred to SmackDown. Big Show's attack also led Clay to vow to be more aggressive in the ring. At No Way Out, Clay defeated David Otunga in the pre-show match. Later during the pay-per-view, Clay interfered in the main event steel cage match, costing Big Show the match to John Cena and as per the match stipulation, causing the firing of John Laurinaitis. Big Show then made an appearance on the June 22 episode of SmackDown, leading to Clay physically confronting him. With Laurinaitis fired, Clay was allowed to return to Raw from June 25, where he faced Big Show; Big Show defeated Clay to end Clay's 24-match winning streak. Clay then began a feud with Damien Sandow on the July 30 episode of Raw; Sandow attacked Clay when he laughed at a video of Sandow's beatdown at the hands of DX. Clay and Sandow finally faced off on the August 20 episode of Raw, where Sandow won, but he was attacked by Clay after the match. At the Survivor Series pay-per-view, Clay took part in 10 man elimination tag team match alongside Tyson Kidd, Justin Gabriel, Rey Mysterio and Sin Cara, but he was the first man out after being eliminated by Tensai.

In January 2013, Clay competed in the 2013 Royal Rumble match and was eliminated by five men. Tensai was embarrassed after a dance contest, but Clay encouraged him to dance and have fun because "what happens in Vegas stays in Vegas". Tensai, with Clay's encouragement, began using several "silly dance moves". Two days later on WWE Main Event, Clay came out to support Tensai during his match with Titus O'Neil. Following this, Clay and Tensai formed a tag team and went on to defeat established teams such as Primo & Epico, Heath Slater and Jinder Mahal of 3MB and Team Rhodes Scholars (Cody Rhodes and Damien Sandow). On the March 22 episode of SmackDown, Tensai and Clay were defeated by Team Rhodes Scholars after an interference from The Bella Twins. Tensai and Clay announced their official tag-team name "Tons of Funk" on the March 27 episode of Main Event, where they accompanied The Funkadactyls to ring in a losing effort to The Bella Twins. The two teams were originally booked to face each other in an eight-person mixed tag team match on April 7 at WrestleMania 29, but their match was cut due to time constraints. The match instead took place the following night on Raw, where Tons of Funk and The Funkadactyls emerged victorious.

In November 2013, Clay started a storyline where he became angry and jealous of the debuting Xavier Woods, who "borrowed" Clay's music and The Funkadactyls for his entrance. Clay thus began to exhibit more villainous tendencies, such as repeatedly attacking Woods, after he had defeated Woods in a match. At TLC: Tables, Ladders & Chairs, Clay faced Woods' partner, R-Truth and continually assaulted Truth instead of going for a win, so Tensai and the Funkadactyls left in protest and Clay lost the match.

On the next day on Raw, Clay completed his heel turn by abandoning Tensai to lose their tag match and attacking Tensai after the match. Clay found no immediate success, as he went on to lose to Tensai, Woods and Truth in singles matches. On the April 17 episode NXT, Clay would lose by countout against Adrian Neville in a non-title match. He lost a No-Disqualification match to Adrian Neville for the NXT Championship in what would be his last match with the company. On June 12, 2014, Clay was released by WWE.

=== Total Nonstop Action Wrestling / Impact Wrestling (2014–2018) ===
On September 16, 2014, Murdoch debuted for Total Nonstop Action Wrestling (TNA) under the ring name Tyrus at TNA's television tapings, aligning himself with Ethan Carter III (EC3). Moments after EC3 introduced him, he had his first wrestling match on the October 15 episode of Impact Wrestling against Shark Boy, which he won. Together they entered the TNA World Tag Team Championship number one contenders tournament, defeating Eric Young and Rockstar Spud in the quarterfinals, only to lose to The Hardy Boyz on the October 29 episode of Impact Wrestling in the semifinals, when Tyrus was pinned by Matt Hardy. At Lockdown, Tyrus defeated Spud and Mark Andrews in a 2-on-1 Six Sides of Steel match. At Joker's Wild 2015, Tyrus and Knux lost to Ethan Carter III and Crazzy Steve. At Hardcore Justice 2015. Tyrus competed in a 12-man Hardcore Gauntlet Battle Royal which was won by James Storm. On May 15, 2015, episode of Impact Wrestling, Tyrus lost to Mr. Anderson. At Slammiversary, Carter and Tyrus defeated Lashley and Mr. Anderson in the co-main event. At World Cup 2015, Tyrus (representing Team EC3) defeated Team Hardy's Gunner and later in the main event Team Hardy defeated Team EC3 in a Six-on-Six Elimination Tag Team match failing to win the world cup. At Turning Point, Tyrus lost to Matt Hardy.

On October 4, 2015, at Bound For Glory, Tyrus won a gauntlet for the gold match to become the number one contender for the TNA World Heavyweight Championship. On April 26, 2016, at TNA Sacrifice (2016) Tyrus would get his championship match but lost to Drew Galloway.

At One Night Only: Live!, Tyrus lost to Lashley. At Joker's Wild 2016, Tyrus and Jade defeated Lashley and Gail Kim to qualify for the Gauntlet Battle Royal match later that night where Drew Galloway won the 14-person intergender Joker's Wild gauntlet battle royal. On a June 28, 2016, taping of Impact Wrestling, Tyrus returned as a "fixer" for hire, siding with Grado and Mahabali Shera in a match against The Tribunal and Al Snow. Since then, TNA began airing vignettes for the "fixer" gimmick on Impact Wrestling on a weekly basis. At One Night Only: September 2016, Tyrus defeated Crazzy Steve. This was his first singles victory since Bound for Glory. At Against All Odds (aired November 4, 2016), Tyrus defeated Trevor Lee. At Bound for Glory, Tyrus competed in a 10-Man Bound for Gold Gauntlet match which was won by Eli Drake.

Tyrus returned to Impact Wrestling and began aligning himself with Eli Drake. At Joker's Wild 2017, Tyrus and Crazzy Steve lost to Mike Bennett and Braxton Sutter. On January 6, 2017, Tyrus and Eli Drake unsuccessfully challenged The Broken Hardys (Jeff Hardy and Matt Hardy) for the TNA World Tag Team Championships at TNA One Night Only: Live!. On August 18, 2017, the promotion announced that Tyrus was granted his release from his contract. Murdoch explained that he didn't feel comfortable with Jeff Jarrett returning to Impact, since Murdoch decided in the past to stay with TNA and didn't sign a contract with GFW.

At Impact's January 2018 tapings, he returned to defeat his former boss Ethan Carter III after turning on him. However, his return was short-lived when, on April 18, 2018, Tyrus left Impact once again, confirming his release and departure from the company. Murdoch claimed that poor booking decisions involving his character would hurt his reputation, so he left the promotion again.

=== Independent circuit (2018) ===
Tyrus made his debut for Tommy Dreamer's House of Hardcore at House of Hardcore 52 on December 8, teaming with Robert Strauss to unsuccessfully face David Arquette and RJ City.

=== National Wrestling Alliance (2021–2023) ===
On March 11, 2021, National Wrestling Alliance announced on their social media that Tyrus would make his NWA debut at Back For The Attack defeating Kratos. On the April 20 episode of NWA Powerrr, Tyrus defeated Marshe Rockett and Matt Cross to become number one contender for the NWA World Television Championship. The next week, Tyrus and The Pope fought to a 6-minute time limit draw for the NWA Television Championship. On June 6 at When Our Shadows Fall, Tyrus defeated The Pope in a non-title match. On the August 6 episode of Powerrr, Tyrus defeated The Pope to win the NWA World Television Championship. Tyrus successfully defended his title in his first title defense against BLK Jeez. During his reign, Tyrus successfully defended the NWA World Television Championship against various contenders, such as Jordan Clearwater, Cyon, Jaden Roller, Rodney Mack, Mims and Odinson.

Tyrus unsuccessfully challenged Trevor Murdoch for the NWA World's Heavyweight Championship at NWA 74th Anniversary Show on August 28, 2022. On the September 24, 2022, episode of NWA USA, Tyrus vacated the NWA World Television Championship using the "Lucky 7" rule to challenge Murdoch and Matt Cardona for the NWA World's Heavyweight Championship at NWA Hard Times 3. At the event on November 12, Tyrus pinned Murdoch to win the title, marking his first world championship in his career.

On February 11, 2023, at Nuff Said, Tyrus successfully defended his title in his first title defense against Matt Cardona, with the help from Bully Ray, whom he promised to give a title shot anytime he wanted afterwards. Tyrus, holding the NWA World's Heavyweight Championship belt, was featured in a commercial for Fox News Channel's talk show 'Gutfeld!' during Super Bowl LVII. On April 7 at NWA 312, Tyrus successfully defended the NWA World's Heavyweight Championship against Chris Adonis. On June 3, during night one of the Crockett Cup, Tyrus teamed with Adonis under the name "The Midnight Riders" to compete in the namesake tournament, defeating The Warriors from the Wasteland (Judais and Max the Impaler) in the second round, and The Immortals (Kratos and Odinson) in the quarterfinal but lost to Knox and Murdoch in the semifinal. On the July 11 episode of Powerrr, after EC3 successfully defended the NWA National Heavyweight Championship, he dropped the title in the ring, officially relinquishing it to challenge Tyrus for the NWA World's Heavyweight Championship at NWA 75th Anniversary Show (NWA 75). Over two weeks later, Tyrus requested that the match be made a bullrope match given the history between him and EC3 stemming across Impact Wrestling and WWE. He also proposed the stipulation that he would retire should he lose the match. On August 27, at NWA 75, Tyrus lost the NWA World title Bullrope match to EC3, thus he was forced to retire. After the match, Tyrus said his goodbyes and thanked his family, the NWA and Billy Corgan, before the NWA locker room came out to embrace him.

== Television commentary career ==
In November 2016, Fox News host Greg Gutfeld invited Murdoch to appear as a guest commentator on The Greg Gutfeld Show. After Murdoch's first appearance, Gutfeld offered to have him back on the show, under his stage name "Tyrus," twice a month. He then began making guest appearances on various programs on Fox News Channel, including The Five. Gutfeld has jokingly referred to Tyrus as his "massive sidekick." Subsequently, he became a regular contributor on Fox News host Dana Perino's former daytime news show, The Daily Briefing. Since April 2021, Tyrus has been a regular panelist on Gutfeld's relaunched 10 p.m. show, Gutfeld!.

From 2018 to 2019, he was a co-host of the show Un-PC on Fox News's streaming channel, Fox Nation. In June 2019, he premiered a new Fox Nation show, Nuff Said.

In 2019, Un-PC co-host Britt McHenry accused Murdoch of sexual harassment after he allegedly sent her a series of lewd text messages. According to Fox News, the matter was investigated and resolved. However, on December 10, 2019, McHenry filed a sexual harassment suit against Fox News and Murdoch. Subsequently, McHenry claimed that she lost the phone containing text messages she said were central to her claims. In July 2021, she voluntarily dismissed the lawsuit and left the Fox network, apparently as part of a legal settlement.

In June 2023, Tyrus hosted the premiere episode of Fox News Saturday Night, where he served as an interim host throughout the year.

In 2024, Tyrus helmed a new series for the streaming platform OutKick entitled Maintaining with Tyrus, debuting on February 1.

== Personal life ==
Murdoch married his longtime girlfriend Ingrid Rinck Herbert on January 7, 2024. She is an entrepreneur and fitness trainer. Together they have a daughter named Georgie Jane born on May 7, 2014.

== Filmography ==
=== Film ===
Year	Title	Role	Notes
2012	No One Lives	Ethan	
2014	Scooby-Doo! WrestleMania Mystery	Brodus Clay	
2017	Beast of the Water	Bateman	
2017	Supercon	Security Guard	
2020	Stand On It	Sheriff Cletus T. Necessary	
2021	Poker Run	Cletus T. Necessary	

=== Television ===
Year	Title	Role	Notes
2013	Total Divas	Himself	3 Episodes
2014	Trashville	Danye East	Episode: "Meeting the Maker"
2015–present	Gutfeld!	Himself	Regular panelist
2017	GLOW	Mighty Tom Jackson	2 Episodes
2017	Preacher	Hell Guard	3 Episodes
2017	Syn	Dylan	13 Episodes
2017	MacGyver	Goliath	1 episode
2018	Love	Keith the Creamator	1 episode
2018	The Purge	Gate Guard	Episode 4: "Release the Beast"
2019	Nuff Said	Himself	Host

== Bibliography ==
- Just Tyrus: A Memoir (Post Hill Press, 2022, Hardcover) ISBN 1-63758-066-5, ISBN 978-1637580660
- Nuff Said (Post Hill Press, 2023, Hardcover) ISBN 1-63758-905-0, ISBN 978-1637589052
- What It Is, America (Post Hill Press, 2025) ISBN 979-8895652121
- Georgie and Her Great Horse Adventures co-written with Georgie Murdoch (Post Hill Press, 2026) ISBN 979-8895652145

== Championships and accomplishments ==
- National Wrestling Alliance
  - NWA World's Heavyweight Championship (1 time)
  - NWA World Television Championship (1 time)
- Pennsylvania Premiere Wrestling
  - PPW Heavyweight Championship (1 time)
- Pro Wrestling Illustrated
  - Ranked No. 58 of the top 500 singles wrestlers in the PWI 500 in 2023
- Total Nonstop Action Wrestling
  - Bound for Gold (2015)
- WWE
  - Slammy Award (1 time)
    - Best Dancer of the Year (2012)
