= Konnor (wrestler) =

American professional wrestler (born 1980)

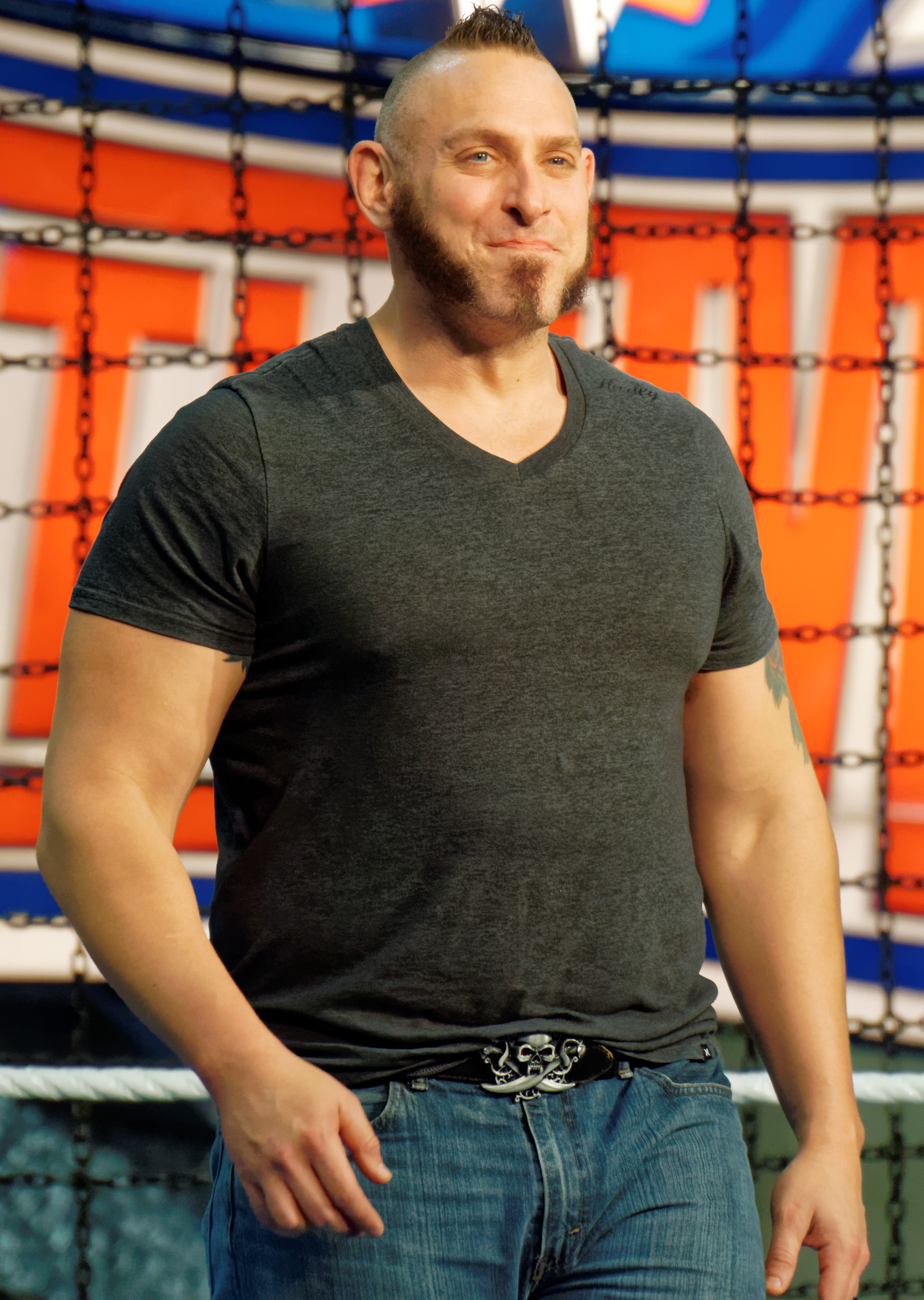
- Konnor in 2016

Personal information
- Born: Ryan Parmeter; February 6, 1980 (age 46) Grand Rapids, Michigan, U.S.
- Spouse: Krissy Vaine (m. 2013)
- Children: 1

Professional wrestling career
- Ring name(s): Big Kon; Kon; Conor O'Brian; Konnor; Payne; Roughhouse O'Reilly; Ryan O'Reilly
- Billed height: 6 ft 5 in (196 cm)
- Billed weight: 265 lb (120 kg)
- Billed from: Boston, Massachusetts
- Trained by: Alex G Rusty Brooks; Bill DeMott; Jody Hamilton; Norman Smiley
- Debut: 2001

Ryan Parmeter (born February 6, 1980) is an American professional wrestler. He is best known for his work in WWE, where he wrestled under the ring name Konnor. He was part of the fourth season of NXT, and earned fourth place on the show's fifth season, NXT Redemption. He also competed in Total Nonstop Action Wrestling (TNA), where he performed under the ring name Kon.

After spending four years wrestling on the independent circuit as Ryan Payne O'Reilly, Parmeter signed a WWE contract in 2005, and was assigned to Deep South Wrestling (DSW), a developmental territory, where he wrestled as Rough House O'Reilly. He won the DSW Heavyweight Championship twice, before briefly appearing in Florida Championship Wrestling (FCW). He also appeared in several dark matches prior to Raw and SmackDown, and at several ECW house shows. In October 2007, both Parmeter and his girlfriend, Krissy Vaine, requested to be released from their WWE contracts for personal reasons.

Following his release, Parmeter took time off from wrestling, before debuting for NWA Charlotte in February 2009. In July 2010, he was re-signed by WWE, and returned to FCW where he began wrestling as Conor O'Brian. In November 2010, he was announced as a participant in the fourth season of NXT.

== Professional wrestling career ==
=== Early career (2001–2005) ===
Parmeter initially trained at the School of Hard Knocks in southern Florida under Rusty Brooks, and made his professional wrestling debut in 2001. He went on to compete in Brooks' promotion, Four Star Championship Wrestling (FSCW) as Ryan Payne O'Reilly, and formed a tag team with Jeff "J-Dawg" Brooks, known as the "Irish Thug Connection". Together, the Irish Thug Connection won the FSCW Tag Team Championship. He also won the FSCW Heavyweight Championship, and spent mid-2004 feuding with Norman Smiley over it. O'Reilly also competed for Florida's Coastal Championship Wrestling (CCW) promotion, and won the CCW Heavyweight Championship. He appeared for Total Nonstop Action Wrestling during the promotion's early shows.

=== World Wrestling Entertainment (2005–2007) ===
After four years on the independent circuit, O'Reilly signed a contract with World Wrestling Entertainment (WWE) in 2005. He was assigned to Deep South Wrestling (DSW), a WWE developmental territory as Roughhouse O'Reilly, and made his DSW debut at the inaugural DSW show on September 1, in a loss to Jack Bull. Over the next several months, he faced wrestlers including "Big Time" Nick Mitchell, Mike Mizanin, Shawn Schultz, Derrick Neikirk, Eric Pérez and Freakin Deacon. In December, he appeared in a dark match prior to the SmackDown tapings.

In early 2006, O'Reilly took a leave of absence. Upon his return, he and Danny Germundo entered a tournament for the DSW Tag Team Championship but were eliminated by Team Elite (Mike Knox and Neikirk) on May 11. On June 22, O'Reilly defeated Neikirk to win the DSW Heavyweight Championship. He successfully defended the championship against Knox, Neikirk, and Montel Vontavious Porter. On September 7, O'Reilly lost the championship to Bradley Jay. During mid-2006, O'Reilly made several appearances at ECW house shows, teaming with Neikirk to face The FBI (Little Guido and Tony Mamaluke). O'Reilly was scheduled to become part of the regular ECW roster in September, but violated the WWE Wellness Program, and was suspended for 30 days.

When he returned, he became the personal assistant of DSW General Manager Krissy Vaine. In December, O'Reilly appeared on an episode of ECW as one of Paul Heyman's personal enforcers alongside Doug Basham. In March 2007, O'Reilly won the DSW Heavyweight Championship for the second time. He lost the championship to Bradley Jay a week later. O'Reilly and Eric Perez were originally scheduled to face The Samoans (Afa Anoa'i Jr. and Sonny Siaki) in the main event of DSW's final event, but he and Perez were replaced by The Major Brothers. During mid-2007, O'Reilly would appear in dark matches prior to Raw and SmackDown against Sylvan Grenier, Chuck Palumbo, Super Crazy, Cody Rhodes and D'Lo Brown.

He briefly appeared in Florida Championship Wrestling (FCW), another WWE developmental territory, where both Lacey Von Erich and Maryse acted as his valets.

In October 2007, both Parmeter and his girlfriend Krissy Vaine requested and were granted their release from WWE. They cited health problems suffered by members of both of their families as the reason.

=== Independent circuit (2007–2010) ===
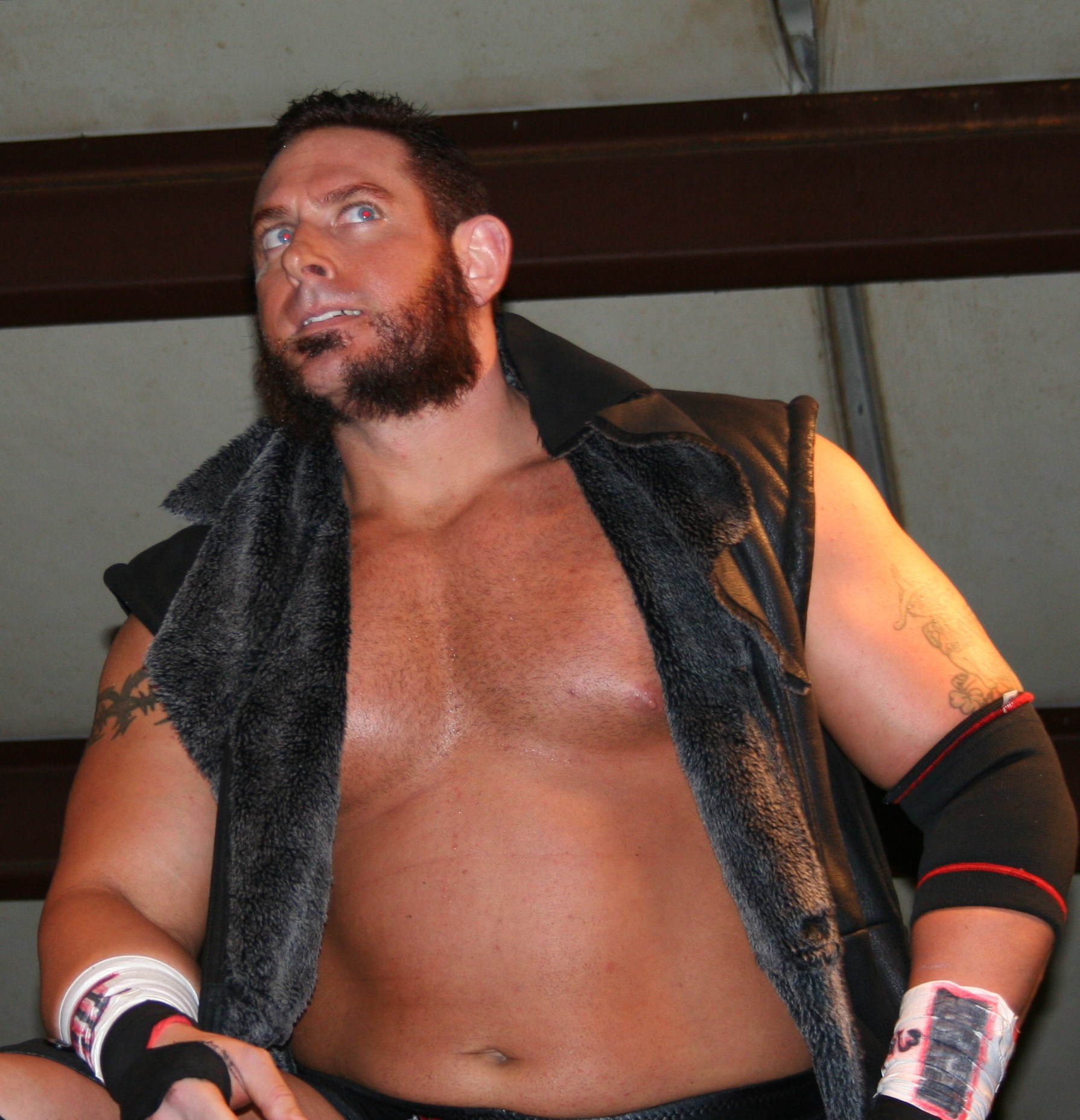
Parmeter in 2009

In October 2007, Parmeter stated that he was taking time off from wrestling. He returned to wrestling in February 2009, working for NWA Charlotte. He wrestled against Truitt Fields for the territory's Heavyweight Championship, but was unable to win the title. After the loss, O'Reilly formed an alliance with Mikael Judas and Phill Shatter called III, which lasted until the territory's closure.

=== Return to WWE (2010-2019) ===
==== Developmental territories (2010–2011) ====
Parmeter was re-signed by the WWE on July 14, 2010, and was reassigned to the FCW developmental territory. On August 12, he debuted for Florida Championship Wrestling as Ryan O'Riley losing to Conrad Tanner. He would compete under this name for a short while before becoming Conor O'Brian on September 30.

On November 30, 2010, during the season finale of season three of NXT, it was announced that Parmeter, under the name Conor O'Brian, would be appearing on season four, with Alberto Del Rio as his mentor. He made his in-ring debut on NXT the following week, teaming with Del Rio to defeat rookie Derrick Bateman and Bateman's mentor Daniel Bryan. O'Brian won his first challenge on the January 4, 2011 episode of NXT, when he won the 'Battle of the Mic Challenge' to earn four immunity points. Two weeks later, on January 18, O'Brian was the second contestant eliminated from NXT. Earlier that night, O'Brian competed in a match against Ricardo Rodriguez in a losing effort.

In March 2011, O'Brian was selected as one of the six former NXT contestants to return to the show in its fifth season, NXT Redemption. During this season, O'Brian was mentored by Vladimir Kozlov. He was later eliminated from competition on the June 28, 2011 episode of NXT, and would later be joined, and eventually replaced, by a returning Derrick Bateman and Daniel Bryan.

==== First incarnation of The Ascension (2011–2012) ====
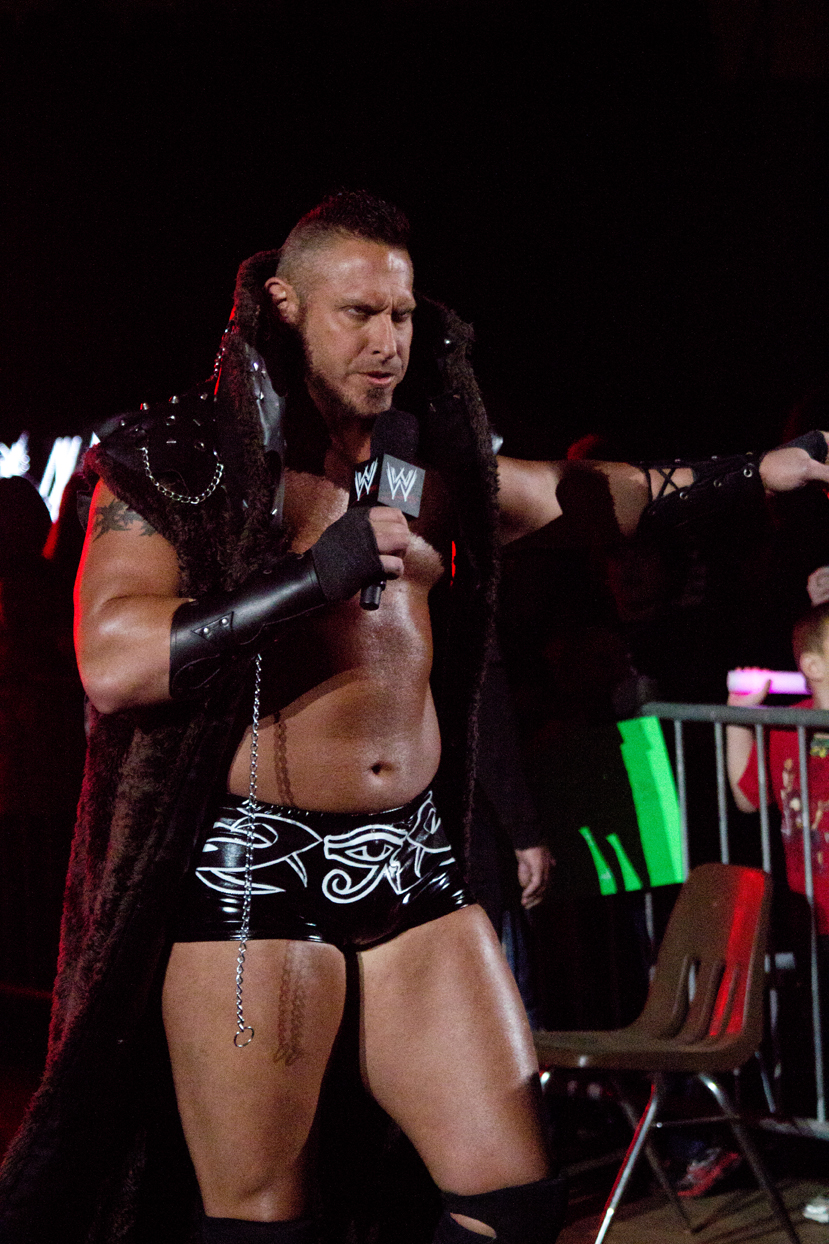
Conor O'Brian in 2013

On August 28, 2011, Ricardo Rodriguez announced the formation of a stable called The Ascension, with members including O'Brian, Kenneth Cameron, Tito Colon and Raquel Diaz. The first match to include all members in some capacity came on September 1, 2011, and saw Cameron, Colon and O'Brian, accompanied by Diaz, defeating CJ Parker, Donny Marlow and Johnny Curtis. On September 30, Cameron and Colon had a shot at the FCW Tag Team Championship but lost to the current champions of CJ Parker and Donny Marlow. By October, however, video packages appeared promoting the Ascension under new seemingly demonic, supernatural characters, and did not include Rodriguez as he was disassociated from the team. By the end of November the Ascension had all but disbanded because O'Brian was injured, Colon had been called up to WWE to team with his cousin Primo, and Diaz became Queen of FCW and distanced herself from the group. This left Cameron as the sole survivor of the Ascension, continuing to use the Ascension gimmick during his appearances. On March 15, 2012, O'Brian returned accompanying Cameron to the ring in his match against Byron Saxton; the match ended in disqualification when O'Brian interfered. Cameron and O'Brian began wrestling as a tag team using the name The Ascension, and their first tag team match together came on March 23 when the two defeated Jason Jordan and Xavier Woods. The Ascension suffered their first loss when the pair lost to the FCW Tag Team Champions Corey Graves and Jake Carter, in a title match.

With the conclusion of NXT Redemption, WWE rebranded its developmental territory FCW into NXT. O'Brian and Cameron, as The Ascension, debuted on the June 20 episode of the rebooted NXT taped at Full Sail University, where they defeated Mike Dalton and CJ Parker. The Ascension then started a feud with The Usos, defeating them on the September 5 NXT, and also scored a win over Justin Gabriel and Tyson Kidd on the October 3 NXT. Two weeks later, the Ascension teamed up with Kassius Ohno to defeat Richie Steamboat and the Usos. The Ascension disbanded on November 30, 2012 when Cameron was released from WWE.

==== NXT Tag Team Champion and main roster debut (2012–2015) ====
O'Brian retained his character while using "The Ascension" as his nickname as he started to feud with Big E Langston for the NXT Championship. O'Brian first faced Langston in a non-title match, which ended in a double disqualification. O'Brian then faced Corey Graves in a number one contender match which had no winner when the Shield attacked both men to make a statement. The next week, O'Brian defeated Graves and Bo Dallas to become the number one contender. The feud ended after O'Brian was defeated in a title match on the April 4 episode of NXT. On the May 29 NXT, O'Brian competed in an 18-man number one contender battle royal and was eliminated by Corey Graves and Kassius Ohno. To reform the Ascension tag team, Rick Victor allied himself with O'Brian and they managed to win the NXT Tag Team Championships held by Adrian Neville and Corey Graves. On November 10, 2013 O'Brian's name was tweaked and shortened to "Konnor". On February 27, 2014 at NXT Arrival, he and Viktor successfully defended the NXT Tag Team Championships against Too Cool, repeating the feat on May 29, 2014 at NXT TakeOver against the team of El Local and Kalisto.

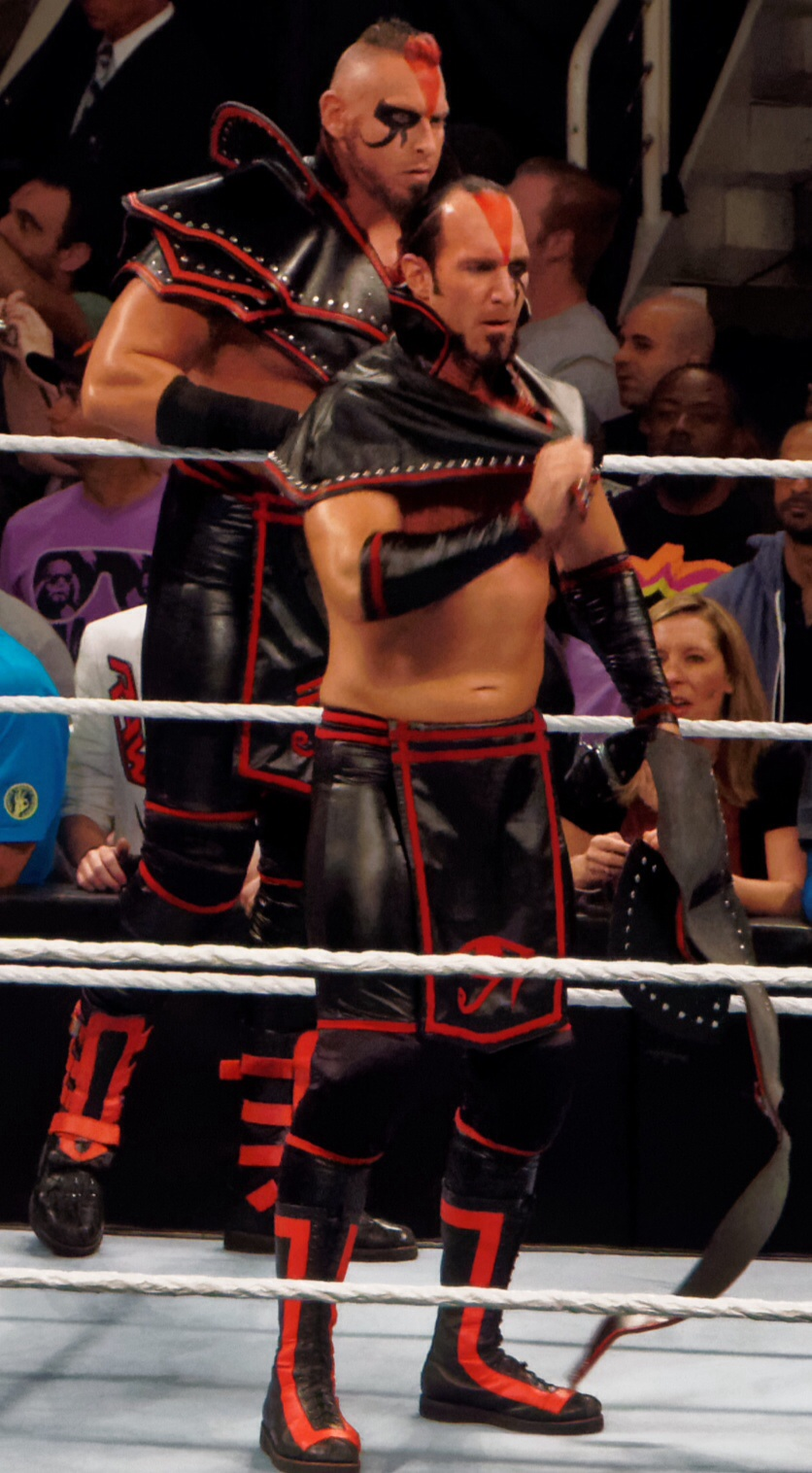
Viktor and Konnor, as the Ascension, in March 2015

Konnor, alongside Viktor, made his main roster debut on the September 9, 2014 episode of Main Event, with the duo defeating Los Matadores (Diego and Fernando) in a tag-team match to promote their NXT tag title defense against The Lucha Dragons (Kalisto and Sin Cara) at the NXT TakeOver: Fatal 4-Way event. On the December 12 episode of SmackDown, vignettes began to air promoting The Ascension's call-up to the main roster. The Ascension made their debut on the December 29 episode of Raw, quickly defeating The Miz and Damien Mizdow. The Ascension would continue to squash local athletes three weeks in a row on Main Event while indirectly criticizing of The Road Warriors. Their first major victory as part of the main roster was a win over The New Age Outlaws at the Royal Rumble. The Ascension suffered their first pinfall loss on the main roster on February 23 episode of Raw, losing to The Prime Time Players (Darren Young and Titus O'Neil). At WrestleMania 31, The Ascension made their WrestleMania debut in the André the Giant Memorial Battle Royal where both failed to win the match. On the May 11 episode of Raw, during a match between Curtis Axel and Macho Mandow, in the guise of Randy Savage, The Ascension attacked Axel and Mandow. It was then announced that the Ascension would face Axel and Mandow on the Payback pre-show, where they won the match. It was announced the Ascension would par take in a six team elimination chamber match for the WWE Tag Team Championship. At Elimination Chamber on May 31, he and Viktor eliminated the Los Matadores and The Lucha Dragons until they were eliminated by The Prime Time Players, ultimately losing the match.

==== Various alliances (2015–2018) ====
On the September 3 episode of SmackDown, The Ascension aligned themselves with Stardust by attacking Neville before their match, and thus forming a group known as "The Cosmic Wasteland". At Night of Champions, The Cosmic Wasteland defeated Neville and the Lucha Dragons on the pre-show. On the Survivor Series kickoff, The Cosmic Wasteland, The Miz, and Bo Dallas were defeated by The Dudley Boyz (Bubba Ray Dudley and D-Von Dudley), Neville, Goldust and Titus O'Neil, in a traditional Survivor Series elimination tag team match. On the Royal Rumble kickoff, The Ascension lost a Fatal 4-Way tag team match to qualify for the Royal Rumble match. At WrestleMania 32, Konnor competed in the André the Giant Memorial Battle Royal but failed to win the match. On April 16, 2016, Konnor was suspended for 60 days for his second violation of the Wellness Program. On the June 24 episode of Superstars, Konnor returned from suspension when The Ascension faced the Golden Truth (Goldust and R-Truth) in a losing effort.

On July 19 at the 2016 WWE draft, The Ascension were drafted to SmackDown, making their debut on the July 26 episode in a WWE World Championship No. 1 Contender's Six-Pack Qualifying Battle Royal, which was won by Apollo Crews. At the SummerSlam kickoff, The Ascension competed in a 12-man tag team match where their team lost. They then entered the SmackDown Tag Team Championship tournament, where they were eliminated in the first round by The Usos. On the September 27 episode of SmackDown Live, The Ascension picked up their first win on the brand, when The Ascension and The Usos defeated Heath Slater, Rhyno and American Alpha (Chad Gable and Jason Jordan) in an eight-man tag team match. At 2017 Elimination Chamber, The Ascension competed in a tag team turmoil match for the SmackDown Tag Team Championship where they were the final team eliminated. Konnor, alongside Viktor, would later enter the André the Giant Memorial Battle Royal at WrestleMania 33, but both men were eliminated from the match. At Money in the Bank (2017), The Ascension lost to Breezango after they claimed responsibility for a vandal attack in their office. On the June 27 episode of SmackDown Live, The Ascension was interrogated by Breezango on "Fashion Vice", admitting that they didn't commit the crime and only took responsibility, because they wanted a match at the PPV. In September, the duo turned face when they started trying to befriend Breezango during the latter's 'Fashion Files' segments. On the January 9 episode of SmackDown Live, The Ascension a loss to The Bludgeon Brothers (Harper and Rowan), for a while the duo would only appear as supporting characters in Breezango's Fashion Files skits. The duo were participants in the André the Giant Memorial Battle Royal at WrestleMania 34, with Konnor being the first of the duo to be eliminated.

==== Final appearances and departure (2018–2019) ====
During the 2018 Superstar Shake-up, The Ascension were traded to Raw. On the April 23 episode of Raw, The Ascension, once again as heels, facing against the team of Matt Hardy and Bray Wyatt in a losing effort. At the Greatest Royal Rumble event, Konnor entered at number 19 but was eliminated by Elias. On the September 24 episode of Raw, he got a victory over Chad Gable in singles competition. On the October 1 episode of Raw, he defeated Bobby Roode. At WrestleMania 35, Konnor competed in the André the Giant Memorial Battle Royal but failed to win the match. On the April 12, 2019 episode of Main Event, The Ascension lost to Heavy Machinery (Otis and Tucker), in what would be their final match in WWE.

On December 8, 2019, WWE announced it had come to terms on the release of Parmeter along with his partner, ending his nine year run with the company.

=== Return to independent circuit (2020–present) ===
Following their departure from WWE, Konnor and Viktor were announced for Wrestling Revolver's Pancakes and Piledrivers event during WrestleMania 36 weekend. On February 20, 2020, The Ascension competed in their first match since leaving WWE at Outlaw Wrestling defeating Bull James and Bill Carr. Konnor joined the Isolation Wrestling Federation on May 9, 2020.

=== Impact Wrestling / Total Nonstop Action Wrestling (2022–2024) ===
On the February 10, 2022 episode of Impact!, Konnor, under the ring name Big Kon, would make his Impact Wrestling debut, where he was defeated by Josh Alexander.

On November 3, 2022 edition of Impact, Konnor returned to Impact Wrestling joining Violent by Design, which would later be renamed to The Design.

On the February 1, 2024 edition of Impact!, Kon ended his partnership with Deaner, declaring that The Design is dead. Later that night, following a match between PCO and Deaner, Kon would attack both men, further signaling the end of The Design and beginning a feud with PCO. Following weeks of attacks against each other, a match between Kon and PCO was made for No Surrender. At the event, Kon lost to PCO by disqualification. At Sacrifice, Kon lost to PCO in a No Disqualification match. At Under Siege, Kon and Steph De Lander lost to PCO and Jordynne Grace in a Intergender tag team match.

On the August 22, 2024 edition of Impact!, Kon, Madman Fulton and Steph De Lander lost to PCO, Rhino and Xia Brookside in Kon's last match for the company.

In January 2025, Big Kon was no longer on the TNA roster page after his contract ended at the beginning of the year.

== Personal life ==
Parmeter began dating fellow professional wrestler Kristin Eubanks better known as Krissy Vaine in 2006. In an interview in October 2007, Parmeter announced the two were engaged Their marriage ended in a split in 2024; he has since remarried. In September 2017, the couple had their first child, a boy, named Elijah.

== Other media ==
Konnor made his video game debut as a part of the NXT Arrival DLC pack in WWE 2K15, then reappeared as part of WWE 2K16, WWE 2K17, WWE 2K18 and WWE 2K19.

Konnor appeared as uncredited in the film Countdown.

== Championships and accomplishments ==
- Atomic Revolutionary Wrestling
  - ARW Tag Team Championship (1 time) – with Vik
- Coastal Championship Wrestling
  - CCW Heavyweight Championship (1 time)
  - CCW Tag Team Championship (1 time) – with Sean Allen
- Deep South Wrestling
  - DSW Heavyweight Championship (2 times)
- Four Star Championship Wrestling
  - FSCW Heavyweight Championship (1 time)
  - FSCW Tag Team Championship (1 time) – with Jeff "J-Dawg" Brooks
- Georgia Championship Wrestling
  - GCW Heavyweight Championship (1 time)
- I Believe In Wrestling
  - SCW Florida Heavyweight Championship (1 time, current)
- Insane Wrestling Revolution
  - IWR World Heavyweight Championship (1 time)
- Kings of Pro Wrestling
  - KPW Heavyweight Championship (2 times)
- Maximum Pro Wrestling
  - MPW Television Championship (1 time)
- NWA Sunray Pro Wrestling
  - NWA Sunray Heavyweight Championship (1 time)
- Platinum Pro Wrestling
  - PPW Platinumweight Championship (1 time)
- Pro Wrestling Illustrated
  - PWI ranked him No. 123 of the top 500 singles wrestlers in the PWI 500 in 2014
- Universal Championship Wrestling
  - UCW Unified Atlantic Tag Team Championship (1 time) – with Vik
- UPW Pro Wrestling
  - UPW American Champion (2 times, current)
- WWE
  - NXT Tag Team Championship (1 time) – with Viktor
