= Deep South Heavyweight Championship =

Professional wrestling championship

Details
- Promotion: Deep South Wrestling
- Date established: February 12, 1986
- Current champion: "The Hoochie Daddy" Najasism
- Date won: June 29, 2025
Statistics
- First champion: Tommy Rich
- Most reigns: Bradley Jay and Assassin #1 (3 reigns)
- Longest reign: "The Hoochie Daddy" Najasism (451 days)
- Shortest reign: Roughhouse O'Reilly and Bradley Jay (7 days)

The Deep South Heavyweight Championship was the primary championship in Deep South Wrestling, a former developmental territory of World Wrestling Entertainment (WWE) between 2005 and 2007. When the title was first introduced, it was awarded to Tommy Rich, who won a tournament to determine the inaugural champion. The final champion of its first run was The Assassin, who vacated the title due to injury and folded the promotion in October 1988.

In 2005, after seventeen years of inactivity, Deep South Wrestling was revived as a developmental territory for WWE and revived the championship. It was awarded to Mike Mizanin, who won a tournament to become champion. The title was vacated on April 18, 2007, when WWE ceased using DSW as a developmental territory. On July 12, 2007, a tournament was held to crown a new champion, which was won by Austin Creed. In October 2007, DSW closed down a second time. In March 2023, Nick Patrick revealed a brand-new Deep South Heavyweight Championship belt. In August 2023, it was announced that a new champion would be determined the following month in an eight-man tournament that was subsequently won by Skrilla the Great.

== Tournaments ==
=== WWE Developmental years ===
==== November 23 – December 1, 2005 ====
The title was first awarded to the winner of an 8-Man Single Elimination Tournament, held over a 2-week period, with the first-round matches being held November 23, 2005, and the semi-final and final matches on December 1.

First Round
Mike Mizanin
Eric Pérez
Mac Daddy Johnson
"Silverback" Ryan Reeves
Mike Knox
Mike Taylor
Tony Santorelli
Palmer Cannon

Semifinals
Mike Mizanin
Kid Kash†
Mike Knox
Tony Santorelli

Final
Mike Mizanin
Mike Knox

=== Post-WWE ===
==== July 12, 2007 ====
The title was "held-up" after the agreement between WWE and DSW ended in March 2007, and another tournament was held in on July 12 to crown the new champion.

First Round
Austin Creed
Simon Sermon
Alexander the Great
Salvatore Rinauro†
Murder One
J-Rod
Rick Michaels
Pretty Boy Floyd

Semifinals
Austin Creed
Alexander the Great
Murder One
Rick Michaels

Final
Austin Creed
Murder One

↑Alexander the Great defeated Salvatore Rinauro by Coin Toss

==== September 9, 2023 ====
After nearly 16 years of inactivity, a tournament to determine a new champion took place on September 9, 2023. Lamar Diggs was the wild card entrant.

First Round
Najasism
Chad Skywalker
Skrilla the Great
Shoot Taylor
Lamar Diggs
Tyson Maddux
Jacob Johnson
Tyler the Wall

Semifinals
Najasism
Skrilla the Great
Lamar Diggs
Jacob Johnson

Final
Skrilla the Great
Jacob Johnson

== Title history ==
Key
| No. | Overall reign number |
| Reign | Reign number for the specific champion |
| Days | Number of days held |
| <1 | Reign lasted less than a day |

| No. | Champion | Championship change | | | Reign statistics | | Notes | Ref. |
| No. | Champion | Date | Event | Location | Reign | Days | Notes | Ref. |
|---|---|---|---|---|---|---|---|---|
| 1 | Tommy Rich | February 12, 1986 | N/A | Marietta, Georgia | 1 | 142 | Wins tournament to become the first champion | |
| 2 | Flame | July 4, 1986 | N/A | Albany, Georgia | 1 | 83 | | |
| 3 | Mr. Wrestling II | September 25, 1986 | N/A | Carrollton, Georgia | 1 | 45 | | |
| 4 | Flame | November 9, 1986 | N/A | Athens, Georgia | 2 | 77 | | |
| 5 | Ranger Ross | January 25, 1987 | N/A | Athens, Georgia | 1 | 35 | | |
| 6 | Botswana Beast | March 1, 1987 | N/A | Rome, Georgia | 1 | 87 | | |
| 7 | Tommy Rich | May 27, 1987 | N/A | Marietta, Georgia | 2 | 35 | | |
| 8 | Randy Rose | July 1, 1987 | N/A | Columbia County, Georgia | 1 | 341 | | |
| 9 | Assassin #1 | June 6, 1988 | N/A | Atlanta, Georgia | 3 | 134 | Formerly known as Flame | |
| — | Vacated | October 18, 1988 | — | — | — | — | Promotion closed | |
| 10 | Mike Mizanin | December 1, 2005 | DSW | McDonough, Georgia | 1 | 21 | Defeated Mike Knox in a tournament final when the promotion reopens as a talent developmental league of WWE | |
| 11 | Derek Neikirk | December 22, 2005 | DSW | McDonough, Georgia | 1 | 182 | | |
| 12 | Roughhouse O'Reilly | June 22, 2006 | DSW | McDonough, Georgia | 1 | 77 | | |
| 13 | Bradley Jay | September 7, 2006 | DSW TV #21 | McDonough, Georgia | 1 | 140 | | |
| 14 | Vito | January 25, 2007 | DSW TV #40 | McDonough, Georgia | 1 | 28 | Defeated Bradley Jay and Roughhouse O'Reilly in a three-way round robin match. | |
| 15 | Bradley Jay | February 22, 2007 | DSW TV #43 | McDonough, Georgia | 2 | 7 | | |
| 16 | Roughhouse O'Reilly | March 1, 2007 | DSW TV #44 | McDonough, Georgia | 2 | 7 | | |
| 17 | Bradley Jay | March 8, 2007 | DSW TV #44 | McDonough, Georgia | 3 | 7 | | |
| — | Vacated | March 15, 2007 | — | — | — | — | Title held-up after a match with Roughhouse O'Reilly when the agreement between WWE and DSW ends. | |
| 18 | Austin Creed | July 12, 2007 | DSW | Locust Grove, Georgia | 1 | 91 | Defeated Murder One in tournament final. | |
| — | Vacated | October 11, 2007 | — | — | — | — | Promotion closed | |
| 19 | Skrilla the Great | September 9, 2023 | DSW THE GRAND PRIX | Atlanta, Georgia | 1 | 42 | Defeated Jacob Johnson in a tournament final for the reactivated title. | |
| 20 | "The Hoochie Daddy" Najasism | October 21, 2023 | DSW New Realm Atlanta | Atlanta, Georgia | 1 | 56 | | |
| 21 | Skrilla the Great | December 16, 2023 | DSW FINAL CONFLICT | Atlanta, Georgia | 2 | 224 | | |

== Combined reigns ==
| Rank | Wrestler | No. of reigns | Combined days |
|---|---|---|---|
| 1 | "The Hoochie Daddy" Najasism | 2 | 508 |
| 2 | Randy Rose | 1 | 341 |
| 3 | Jacob Johnson | 1 | 337 |
| 4 | Flame/Assassin #1 | 3 | 294 |
| 5 | Skrilla the Great | 2 | 266 |
| 6 | Derek Neikirk | 1 | 182 |
| 7 | Tommy Rich | 2 | 177 |
| 8 | Bradley Jay | 3 | 154 |
| 9 | Austin Creed | 1 | 91 |
| 10 | Botswana Beast | 1 | 87 |
| 11 | Roughhouse O'Reilly | 2 | 84 |
| 12 | Mr. Wrestling II | 1 | 45 |
| 13 | Ranger Ross | 1 | 35 |
| 14 | Vito | 1 | 28 |
| 15 | Mike Mizanin | 1 | 21 |
