= Derick Neikirk =

American professional wrestler (born 1974)

- Born: September 5, 1974 (age 52); Dayton, Ohio, United States
- Professional wrestling career
- Billed height: 6 ft 4 in (1.93 m)
- Billed weight: 245 lb (111 kg)
- Trained by: Les Thatcher
- Debut: 2000
- Retired: 2016
- Baseball career
- Catcher
- Batted: Right Threw: Right

Professional debut
- Gulf Coast League: 1996, for the Gulf Coast League Tigers
- California League: 1996, for the Visalia Oaks

Last Northern League appearance
- 1999, for the Adirondack Lumberjacks

Gulf Coast League statistics
- Batting average: .211
- On-base percentage: .348
- On-base plus slugging: .558

California League statistics
- Batting average: .148
- On-base percentage: .207
- On-base plus slugging: .355

Northern League statistics
- Batting average: .263
- On-base plus slugging: .356
- Stats at Baseball Reference

Derick Lee Neikirk (also spelled Derek Neikirk or Derrick Neikirk; born September 5, 1974) is an American professional wrestler and former professional baseball player. He has competed for several promotions, and currently competes for Impact Zone Wrestling (IZW), a territory of the National Wrestling Alliance (NWA) based in Phoenix, Arizona. He has also wrestled in several other promotions and was signed to a contract with World Wrestling Entertainment (WWE) for several years. Much of his career has been connected with fellow wrestler Mike Knox, as the two have held championships together as a tag team and have feuded on multiple occasions.

== Baseball career ==
Before entering professional wrestling, Neikirk played catcher for the Mesa Community College baseball team in the Arizona Community College Athletic Conference (ACCAC). In 1996, he was named to the All-ACCAC Team. That year, he was picked by the Detroit Tigers in the 19th round of the Major League Baseball draft

At age 21, Neikirk played in Detroit's rookie-class, minor league team, the Gulf Coast League Tigers of the 1996 Gulf Coast League in Lakeland, Florida. He played catcher in 18 games out of a 60-game season. His statistics were as follows: 47 plate appearances, 38 at bats, 8 hits, 4 runs, 1 run batted in (RBI), 5 walks, 7 strikeouts, and 8 total bases. Also, Neikirk ground into a double play 4 times, was hit by a pitch 3 times, and made 1 sacrifice hit. He had a batting average of .211, an on-base percentage of .348, a slugging percentage of .211, and an on-base plus slugging (OPS) of .558.

That same year, Neikirk was promoted to the high-A-class, minor-league team, the Visalia Oaks, of the 1996 California League, in Visalia, California. While there, he played catcher in 9 games out of a 140-game season. His statistics were as follows: 29 plate appearances, 27 at-bats, 4 hits, 3 runs, 2 RBIs, 2 walks, 9 strikeouts, and 4 total bases. He also had a batting average of .148, an on-base percentage of .207, a slugging percentage of .148, and an OPS of .355.

In 1999, at age 24, Neikirk returned to baseball playing for the independent minor league team, the Adirondack Lumberjacks, of the 1999 Northern League, in Glens Falls, New York. While there, he played catcher in 42 games out of an 86-game season. His statistics were as follows: 118 at-bats, 31 hits, 3 doubles, 1 triple, 2 home runs, and 42 total bases. He had a batting average of .263 and a slugging percentage of .356.

On a weighted-average, 80-point scale, Neikirk's Baseball Cube scouting report is as follows:

- Power: 39
- Batting: 22
- Speed: 43
- Contact: 43
- Patience: 62

== Wrestling ==
Throughout his professional wrestling career, Neikirk has competed primarily in the United States. He was also wrestled in Egypt and has worked for the World Wrestling Alliance in Europe and for Enezma in Mexico. Much of his career has been spent portraying a heel (villain) through an arrogant demeanor and by turning on allies.

=== Early career ===
Neikirk trained under Les Thatcher for a career in professional wrestling. In 2002, he formed a tag team known as The A Squad with Chet Jablonski. On July 10, 2002, The A Squad defeated Ice Cream Man and Cody Hawk to win the HWA Tag Team Championship, although this title reign is not recorded in the company's official history. That year, Neikirk was rated number 481 on Pro Wrestling Illustrated's annual PWI 500 list of the top wrestlers in the world. On August 31, 2003, Neikirk wrestled a match on WWE's Sunday Night Heat television program in which he was defeated by Test. In 2003, he improved his PWI 500 ranking and was placed at number 442.

He later wrestled for Ultimate Pro Wrestling (UPW), where he formed a tag team with Mike Knox. The team was also part of a stable known as The Outlaws. Neikirk and Knox later moved to IZW, where they were known as Team Elite. They defeated Navajo Warrior and Hawaiian Lion on January 18, 2005 to win the IZW Tag Team Championship. They held the title belts until March 15, when they dropped them to California Connection (Peter Goodman and Antonio Mestre). On January 6, 2004, Neikirk turned on Knox by superkicking him in the face. He explained this action by saying that he was tired of carrying the team and that Knox had "dropped the ball". That night, Neikirk and Knox faced each other as part of a six-man match, but Neikirk turned on his teammates and left the ring. Neikirk and Knox had a blow off match on May 25. Neikirk won the match, but the referee then reversed his decision and awarded the victory to Knox.

=== World Wrestling Entertainment ===
==== Deep South Wrestling (2005–2007) ====
In 2005, he and Knox were signed by World Wrestling Entertainment and was sent to the Deep South Wrestling (DSW), which was a developmental territory for WWE. They resumed wrestling together as Team Elite. Competing as a singles wrestler, Neikirk won the DSW Heavyweight Championship on December 22 that year by defeating Mike Mizanin. He finished the year ranked number 367 in the PWI 500. He held the Heavyweight Championship for six months before dropping it to Roughhouse O'Reilly. On August 3, 2006, Team Elite faced High Impact (Mike Taylor and Tony Santarelli) for the DSW Tag Team Championship. Neikirk and Knox lost the match, which led to them splitting up and feuding. They faced each other at several DSW house shows, with Knox winning most of the matches. At the same time, Neikirk also teamed with Roughhouse O'Reilley to wrestle The Full Blooded Italians (Little Guide and Tony Mamaluke) on several house shows promoted by WWE's Extreme Championship Wrestling. In 2006, he achieved his highest ranking on the PWI 500, as he was rated number 310.

==== Florida Championship Wrestling (2007–2008) ====
In 2007, Team Elite reunited and won the DSW Tag Team Championship on March 8 with a victory over The Major Brothers. They held the title until WWE ended its association with DSW on April 18, 2007. Neikirk and Knox were sent to Florida Championship Wrestling, another WWE developmental territory, where they continued to form a tag team. Neikirk also appeared on WWE's Extreme Championship Wrestling program as one of Paul Heyman's bodyguards.

In January 2008, he was suspended by WWE for a violation of the company's Wellness Program. He was released from his WWE contract on January 8.

=== Return to IZW ===
He then returned to Impact Zone Wrestling, where he won the NWA Arizona Heavyweight Championship on December 30, 2008 in a match against G.Q. Gallo. The match ended in controversy, however, because both men's shoulders were on the mat as the referee counted the pinfall. Neikirk raised his shoulder just before the final count and was awarded the victory and the title belt. The title was declared vacant until the two men could face each other again on January 27, 2009. This rematch ended in a draw, but Gallo defeated Neikirk to win the vacant title on March 10. Neikirk regained the title, which had been renamed the Arizona Heavyweight Championship, that summer. He held the belt until dropping it to Mike James on August 11. NWA Representative Greg DeMarco then tried to strip James of the belt and return it to Neikirk, but Neikirk refused to accept the title.

=== Return to WWE and retirement ===
After wrestling two matches for Dragon Gate USA as an enhancement talent in 2010, Neikirk returned to WWE and wrestled one dark match in 2011, a loss to Johnny Curtis on SmackDown. He retired shortly after, coming back two nights only in 2016 for the short-lived indie promotion Western States Wrestling.

== Championships and accomplishments ==
- Elite Xtreme Wrestling
  - EXW Heavyweight Championship (1 time)
- Deep South Wrestling
  - DSW Heavyweight Championship (1 time)
  - DSW Tag Team Championship (1 time) – with Mike Knox
- Heartland Wrestling Association
  - HWA Tag Team Championship (1 time) – with Chet Jablonski
- Impact Zone Wrestling
  - IZW Heavyweight Championship (1 time)
  - IZW Tag Team Championship (1 time) – with Mike Knox
  - NWA Arizona Heavyweight Championship (1 time)
