= Botswana Beast =

American retired professional wrestler (born 1964)

Ben Peacock
Personal information
- Born: Benjamin Peacock; February 19, 1964 (age 62) Macon, Georgia, U.S.

Professional wrestling career
- Ring name(s): Atkie Malumba; Botswana Beast; Gigante Kimala 2 Giant Kimala; Giant Kimala #2; Kamala 2 Mambo Warrior; The New Guinea Man Eater; Uganda
- Billed height: 6 ft 1 in (185 cm)
- Billed weight: 375 lb (170 kg)
- Billed from: Botswana; Uganda
- Debut: October 5, 1986
- Retired: 2005

Benjamin Peacock (born February 19, 1964) is an American retired professional wrestler who worked as Botswana Beast for World Class Championship Wrestling, Giant Kimala in Japan, Atkie Malumba in Puerto Rico and Uganda in Extreme Championship Wrestling.

== Professional wrestling career ==
Peacock made his professional wrestling debut in 1986 in Alabama as The New Guinea Man Eater. In 1987, Peacock won his only wrestling title, the Deep South Heavyweight Championship defeating Ranger Ross. He dropped the title two months later to Tommy Rich. Peacock also worked in Memphis for Continental Wrestling Association.

In 1988, Peacock made his debut in Texas for World Class Championship Wrestling as the Botswana Beast. During his stay he mainly feuded with Kerry Von Erich and had a dog collar match with Terry Gordy that ended in a no contest at WCCW Cotton Bowl Extravaganza.

In 1990, World Class folded and Peacock went international making his debut for All Japan Pro Wrestling as Giant Kimala or Giant Kimala #2, a gimmick portraying Kamala, a wild savage billed from Uganda. Both Kimala and the original Kamala would team up with each other. Kimiala also teamed with Abdullah the Butcher for many years.

Also in 1990, Peacock made his debut in Puerto Rico's World Wrestling Council as Atkie Malumba. Malumba worked there from 1990 to 1994 and 1998 to 2000.

Peacock made a short-lived stint for World Championship Wrestling as the Mambo Warrior in 1992.

Giant Kimala teamed with Jun Izumida in Japan from 1996 to 2000.

In 1999 he worked for Extreme Championship Wrestling as Uganda. He had matches with Vito LoGrasso, Sabu, Axl Rotten and Spike Dudley. His biggest match was against ECW Television Champion Rob Van Dam in an unsuccessful attempt.

After ECW, Peacock continued wrestling in Puerto Rico and Japan until his retirement in 2005.

== Championships and accomplishments ==
- Deep South Wrestling
  - Deep South Heavyweight Championship (1 times)
