= Xavier Woods =

American professional wrestler (born 1986)

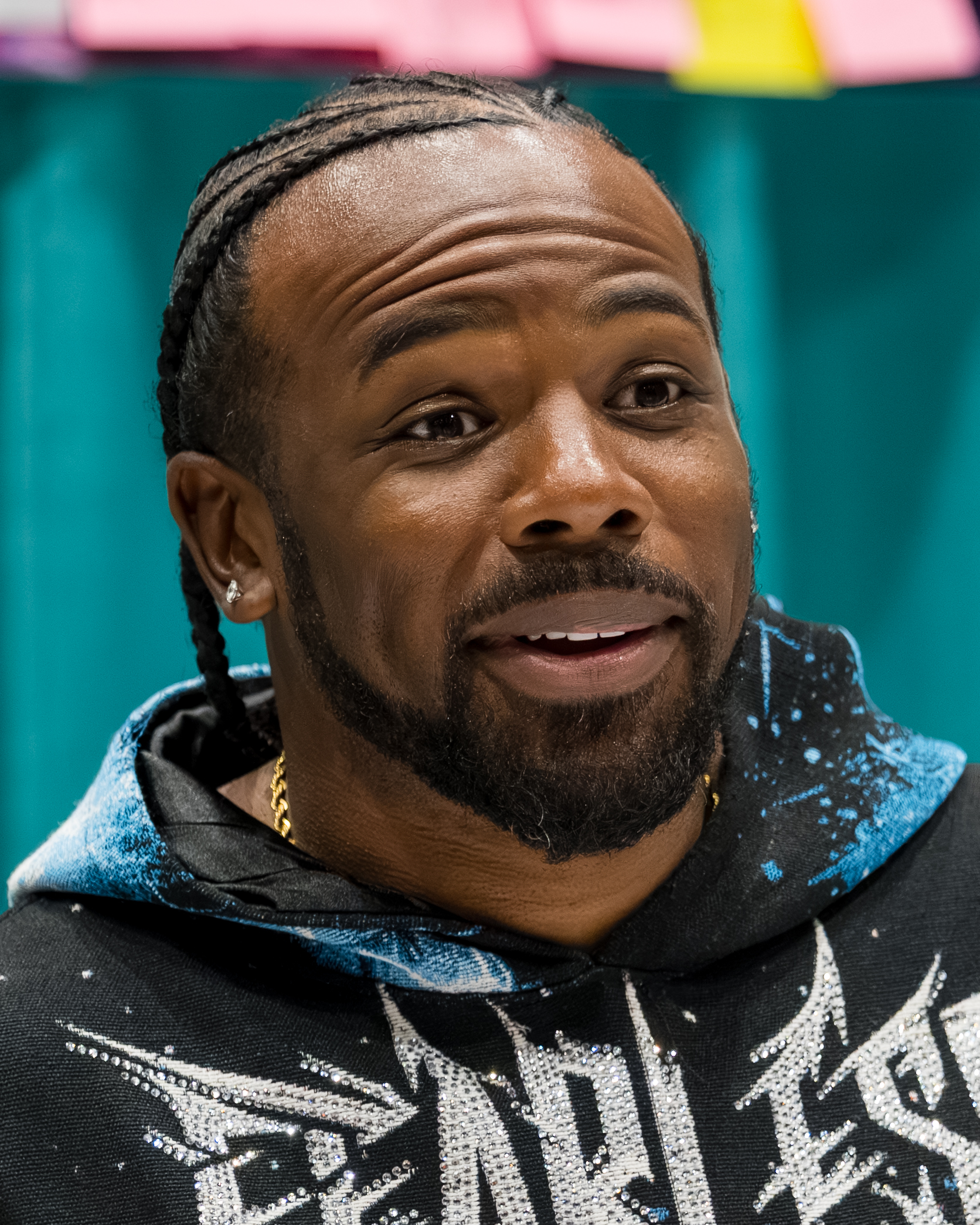
- Watson in 2026

Personal information
- Born: Austin Watson; September 4, 1986 (age 40) Columbus, Georgia, U.S.
- Education: Furman University; Capella University
- Spouse: Jess Watson (m. 2015)
- Children: 2

Professional wrestling career
- Ring name(s): The Batman; Austin Creed; Consequences Creed; Rasheed Lucius Creed; King Woods; Xavier Woods
- Billed height: 5 ft 11 in (180 cm)
- Billed weight: 205 lb (93 kg)
- Billed from: Angel Grove, California; Atlanta, Georgia; Marietta, Georgia
- Trained by: Rob Adonis
- Debut: 2005

Twitch information
- Channel: AustinCreed
- Years active: 2014–2023
- Genres: Gaming; Just Chatting
- Followers: 98.8K

YouTube information
- Channel: UpUpDownDown
- Years active: 2015–2026
- Genres: Gaming; Comedy
- Subscribers: 2.43 million
- Views: 536.1 million
- Last updated: November 7, 2026

Austin Watson (born September 4, 1986) is an American professional wrestler and YouTuber. He is signed to All Elite Wrestling (AEW), where he performs under the ring name Austin Creed and is one-half of The New Level with Kofi. They are two-thirds of the reigning AEW World Trios Champions with Swerve Strickland. He is best known for his 16-year tenure in WWE, where he performed under the ring name Xavier Woods.

Watson previously worked for Total Nonstop Action Wrestling (TNA) as Consequences Creed, and was a one-time TNA World Tag Team Champion with Jay Lethal as Lethal Consequences. After signing with WWE in 2010, he was assigned to its developmental territory Florida Championship Wrestling (FCW) and adopted the ring name Xavier Woods. FCW was later closed and rebranded as NXT, where Woods worked until he was called up to the main roster in 2013. In 2014, Woods formed The New Day alongside Big E and Kofi Kingston, and has since become a record seven-time SmackDown Tag Team Champion, five-time World Tag Team Champion, and one-time NXT Tag Team Champion, making him an overall 13-time tag team champion in WWE. New Day's second reign with the Raw Tag Team Championship was the longest tag team title reign of any male tag team championship in WWE history until that record was broken in February 2021. In October 2021, Woods became the 22nd winner of the King of the Ring tournament and briefly went by the name of King Woods. With his NXT Tag Team Championship win in 2022, Woods also became a Tag Team Triple Crown Champion.

Since 2015, Watson, as Austin Creed, has hosted a gaming YouTube channel titled UpUpDownDown, where he invites fellow WWE performers, gaming personalities, friends, and guests to play games. He was also a host on the G4 television network, which covers video games, following its revival in 2020 until its end in 2022.

== Early life ==
Watson was born in Columbus, Georgia. He graduated from Pebblebrook High School. Later that year, he began studying psychology and philosophy at Furman University in Greenville, South Carolina. He graduated in 2008 with a master's degree in psychology and a bachelor's degree in philosophy.

== Professional wrestling career ==
=== Early years (2005–2007) ===
While attending Furman University, Watson began training for a career in professional wrestling and, in 2005, began wrestling part-time with Rob Adonis' Ultimate Christian Wrestling promotion. While in the Greenville, South Carolina-based World Wrestling Council, he developed his Austin Creed gimmick, which is based heavily on the character Apollo Creed from the Rocky series.

During his time in NWA Anarchy, Creed was part of a tag team called Awesome Attraction with Hayden Young. The pair had one of the longest title reigns in the promotion's history after defeating Justice Served (Jason Justice and Mike Free) in Cornelia, Georgia on April 7, 2007. In 2006, Creed won NWA's Most Popular Wrestler, voted for by the NWA fans.

In 2007, Watson took a day off from college to show up unannounced at the main building of Deep South Wrestling (DSW), then a developmental territory of WWE, and apply for a job as a wrestler; coincidentally, his future New Day partner Kofi Kingston (then using the ringname "Kofi Nahaje Kingston") was working in the ring the exact moment he arrived, marking the first meeting between the two. DSW agreed to give Creed a tryout, although WWE would officially cut ties with DSW shortly before he received a contract. On July 12, 2007, Creed defeated Murder-One in a tournament finals to win the vacant DSW Heavyweight Champion, becoming the first wrestler to hold the title without the company being affiliated with WWE; the company closed its doors the following October 11, making Creed the final DSW Heavyweight Champion.

=== Total Nonstop Action Wrestling (2007–2010) ===
==== X Division (2007–2008) ====
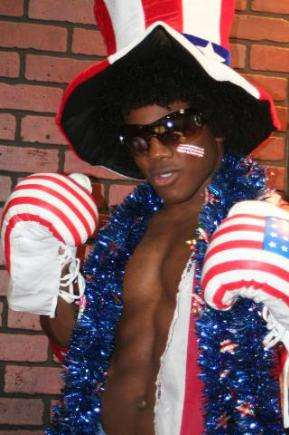
Watson as Consequences Creed posing in October 2007

In 2007, Watson began to train with TNA wrestler AJ Styles. Months later, Styles' wife asked her husband to give Watson a chance. This led to Watson's first match with Total Nonstop Action Wrestling at Bound For Glory pay-per-view, where Waston (under the name Rasheed Lucius "Consequences" Creed) teamed Ron Killings as the replacement for Adam "Pacman" Jones, wrestling AJ Styles and Tomko. On October 21, 2007, it was reported that Creed had signed a contract with TNA. In 2008, Watson was repackaged as Consequences Creed, making his return on the April 10 episode of Impact!, defeating Jimmy Rave in an Xscape match at Lockdown. During the match, Creed eliminated Shark Boy, but was later eliminated by Curry Man. Creed later wrestled in the first ever TerrorDome match at Sacrifice, which was won by Kaz.

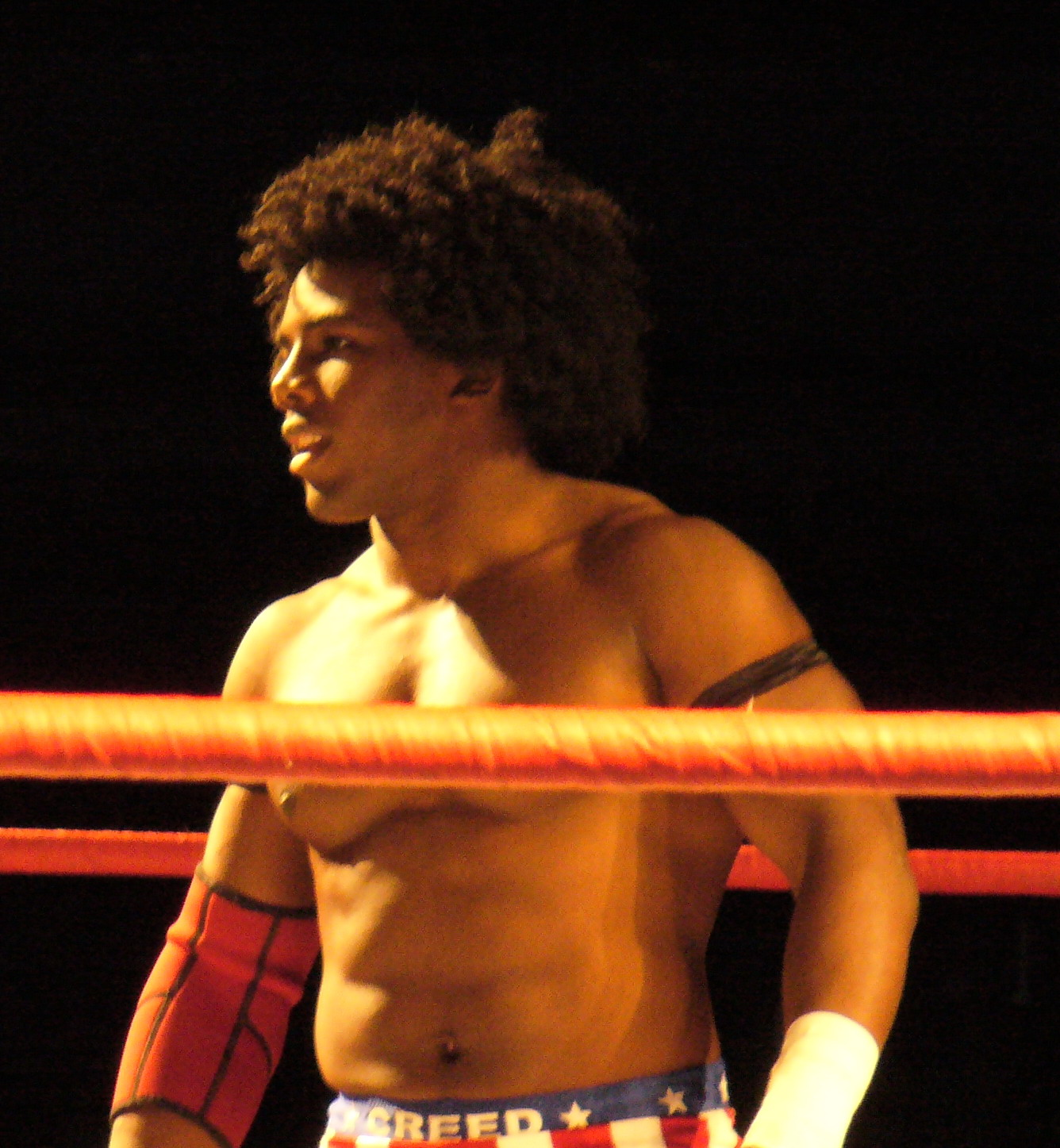
Watson as Consequences Creed in London September 2008

Creed wrestled for the TNA X Division Chamionship three times: twice against Petey Williams at Hard Justice and No Surrender and one at Bound for Glory IV against Sheik Abdul Bashir, but he didn't win the title.

==== Lethal Consequences (2008–2010) ====
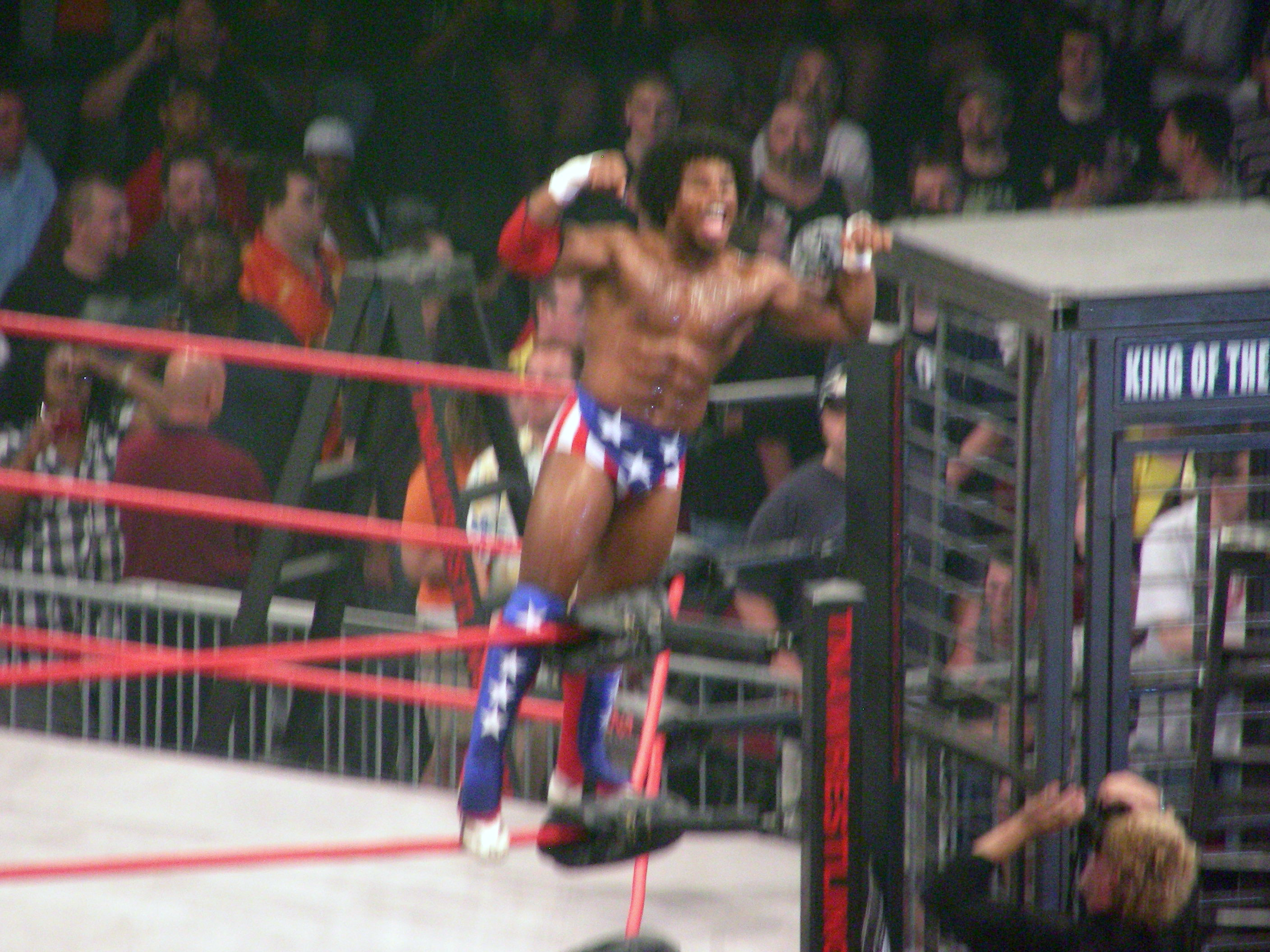
Creed at Slammiversary 2009

On the October 30, 2008, episode of Impact!, Creed joined the Frontline stable, feuding with the Main Event Mafia stable. He began to work with Jay Lethal and won the TNA World Tag Team Championship from the champions Beer Money, Inc. (Robert Roode and James Storm) on January 8, 2009 (taped December 16, 2008), but lost it 20 days later at Genesis. At Against All Odds, Creed and Lethal got their rematch but failed to regain the titles.

For the next few months, Creed and Lethal teamed with the Motor City Machine Guns to try and unmask Suicide. At Against All Odds, Lethal Consequences lost to Beer Money, Inc., At Destination X, Creed competed in an Ultimate X match for the TNA X Division Championship which was won by Suicide. At Lockdown, Creed competed in a Xscape match for the X Division Championship which was won by Suicide. At Sacrifice, Lethal Consequences and Eric Young defeated The Motor City Machine Guns (Alex Shelley and Chris Sabin) and Sheik Abdul Bashir. At Slammiversary, Creed competed in a King of the Mountain match for the X Division Championship which was won by Suicide. At Hard Justice, Creed competed in a Steel Asylum match which was won by Daniels. At Bound for Glory, Lethal Consequences (Consequences Creed and Jay Lethal) lost to the Motor City Machine Guns (Alex Shelley and Chris Sabin) on the preshow. at Final Resolution, Creed competed in a Feast or Fired match but failed to win the match. Watson was released from TNA on March 29, 2010.

=== New Japan Pro-Wrestling (2010) ===
On April 4, New Japan Pro-Wrestling (NJPW) announced Watson, under his Consequences Creed ring name, as a participant in the first Super J Tag Tournament. On May 8, Creed and his partner Kota Ibushi were eliminated from the tournament in the first round by the team of Gedo and Kushida. Creed returned to New Japan on June 28, 2010, teaming up with IWGP Heavyweight Champion Togi Makabe and Tomoaki Honma in the J Sports Crown Openweight 6 Man Tag Tournament. After defeating Tamon Honda, Kentaro Shiga and Makoto Hashi in the opening round, the trio was eliminated from the tournament in the second round by Shinsuke Nakamura, Masato Tanaka and Tomohiro Ishii.

On July 10, Creed defeated Brian Milonas, U-Gene and Tommaso Ciampa to win East Coast Wrestling Association's 2010 Super 8 Tournament.

=== World Wrestling Entertainment/WWE (2010–2026) ===
==== Developmental territories (2010–2013) ====
On July 22, 2010, it was announced that Watson had signed a developmental contract with World Wrestling Entertainment (WWE). In a 2016 interview, Watson revealed that he got hired by showing up unannounced to Florida Championship Wrestling (FCW), a developmental territory of WWE, to apply for a job as wrestler; his future New Day partner Kofi Kingston, who had coincidentally met him on the day Watson had similarly showed up in DSW in 2007, happened to be in the room yet again when Watson entered. WWE had originally wanted to sign Watson full-time, but as he had six months left before finishing college, he turned down the offer; instead, they agreed to let him work part-time until he graduated from college, and gave him a full-time contract afterwards.

Watson, using his real name, made his debut for FCW on July 29, 2010, in a tag team match, where he and Percy Watson were defeated by Brodus Clay and Donny Marlow. Following his debut, he was then added to FCW's official website under the name Xavier Woods. In October, Woods began to team up with Wes Brisco and they took part in a tag team turmoil match on October 14, where they defeated three other teams. On November 4, Woods and Brisco defeated Johnny Curtis and Derrick Bateman to become the Florida Tag Team Champions. On December 1, Woods and Brisco vacated the Tag Team Championship after Brisco was sidelined with an injury. With Brisco sidelined with an injury, Woods teamed up with Marcus Owens to take on Damien Sandow and Titus O'Neil for the vacant Florida Tag Team Championship, but were unsuccessful. Following this, Woods began performing as a singles competitor throughout 2011 and 2012, though without much success.

After WWE rebranded its developmental territory, FCW, into NXT, Woods made his televised debut on the October 31, 2012, episode of NXT with a loss to Leo Kruger. While picking up wins on NXT over the likes of El Local and Jake Carter, Woods began using the gimmick of a fanboy of 1990s popular culture that saw him implement his legitimate fandom of Mighty Morphin Power Rangers, Dragon Ball Z, and other 1990s pop culture into his matches and attire. He stopped using this gimmick once he was called up to WWE's main roster.

==== Teaming with R-Truth (2013–2014) ====
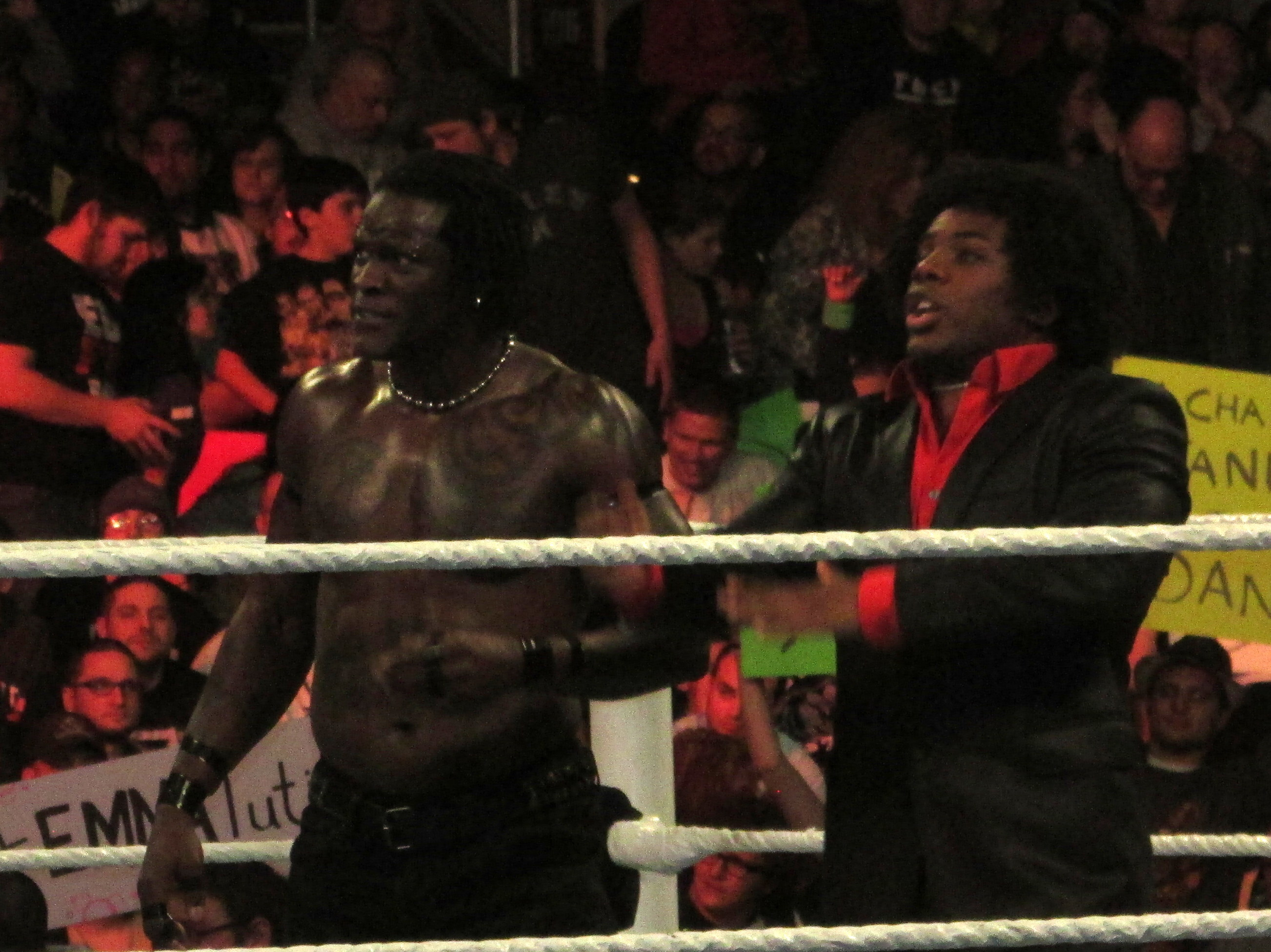
Woods (right) and R-Truth in January 2014

On the November 18, 2013, episode of Raw, Woods made his main roster debut as he teamed with fellow TNA alumnus and former tag-team partner R-Truth to defeat 3MB (Drew McIntyre and Jinder Mahal). The following week on Raw, Woods defeated Heath Slater in his singles debut match while being accompanied by R-Truth and The Funkadactyls (Naomi and Cameron). On the November 29 episode of SmackDown, Woods began a feud with Brodus Clay, after Clay took offense to Woods using his entrance music and The Funkdactyls as his valets. Later that night, Woods suffered his first loss when he and R-Truth lost to Tons of Funk (Clay and Tensai). On the December 2 episode of Raw, Woods and Truth defeated Tons of Funk in a rematch. On the December 9 episode of Raw, Woods lost to Clay. On the December 11 episode of Main Event, Woods and Truth defeated Tons of Funk to end the feud.

On April 6, 2014, Woods made his WrestleMania debut at WrestleMania XXX, where he competed in the André the Giant Memorial Battle Royal, but failed to win the match. Woods and Truth then began a feud with the debuting Alexander Rusev, and were defeated by him in singles encounters. At Extreme Rules, Woods and Truth was defeated by Rusev in a handicap match. After that loss, Woods and Truth's team quietly disbanded.

==== The New Day (2014–2026) ====
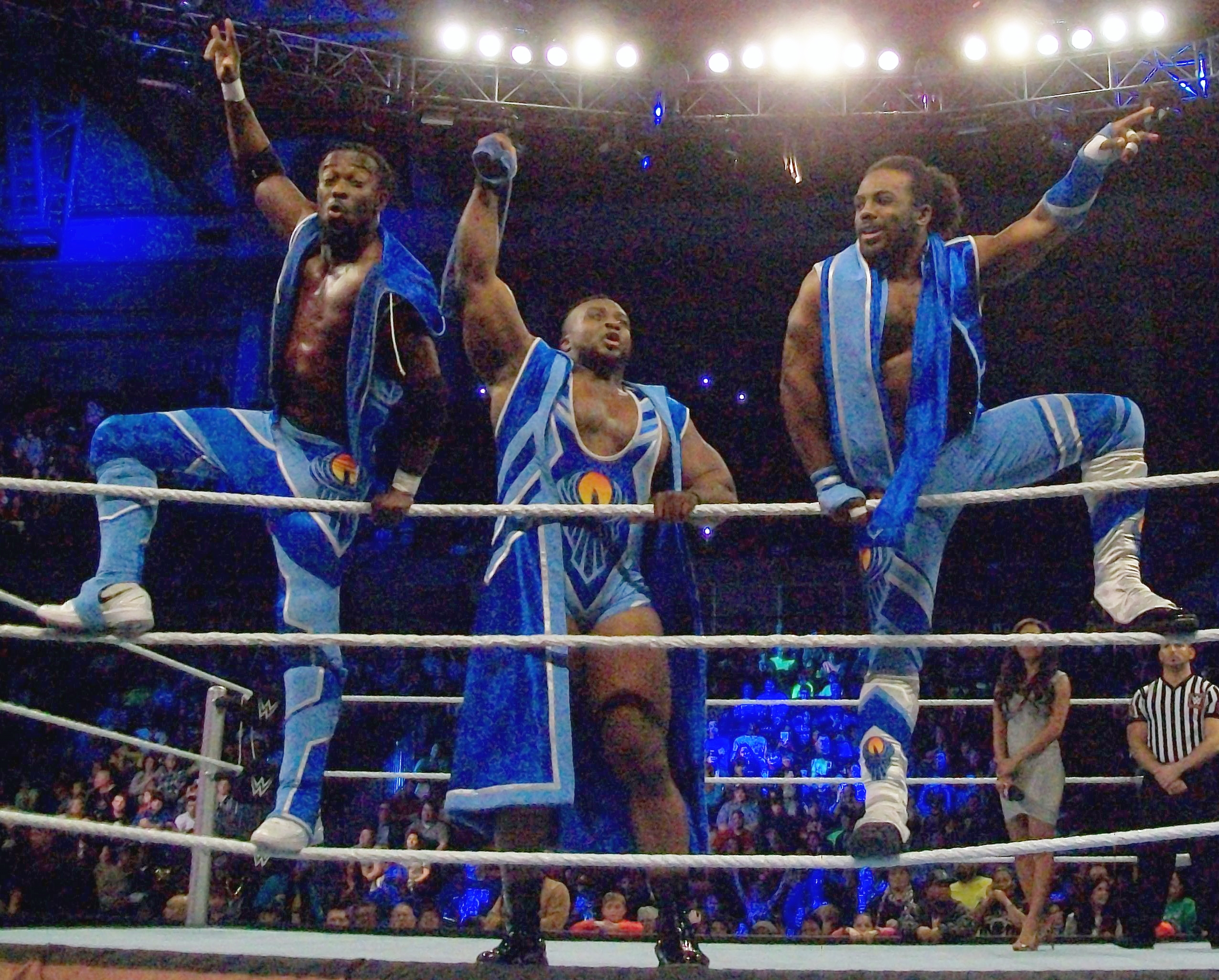
Woods (right) with Kofi Kingston and Big E as The New Day in January 2015

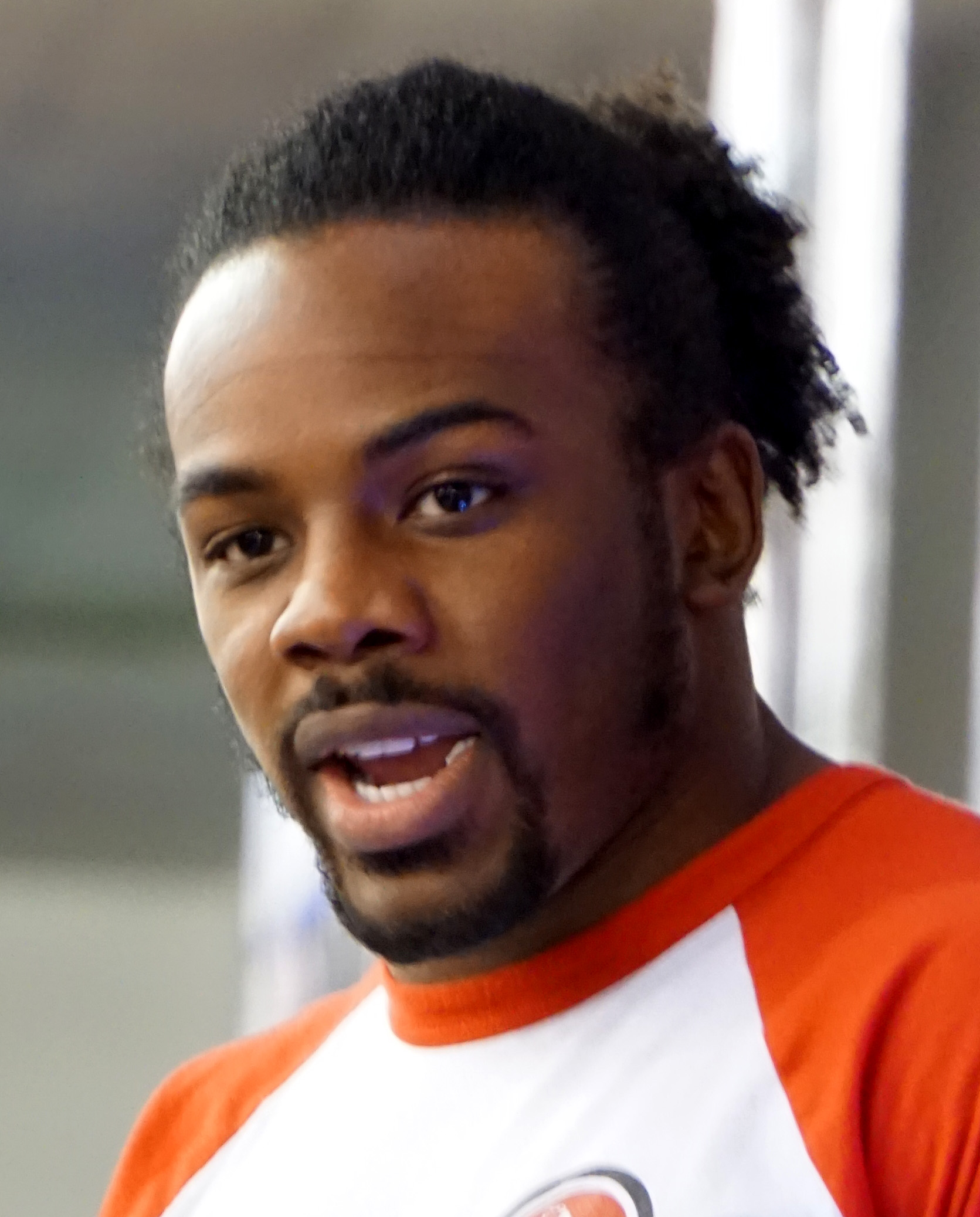
Woods in 2015

In July 2014, Woods joined Big E and Kofi Kingston, making their debut as the New Day stable on the November 28 episode of SmackDown.

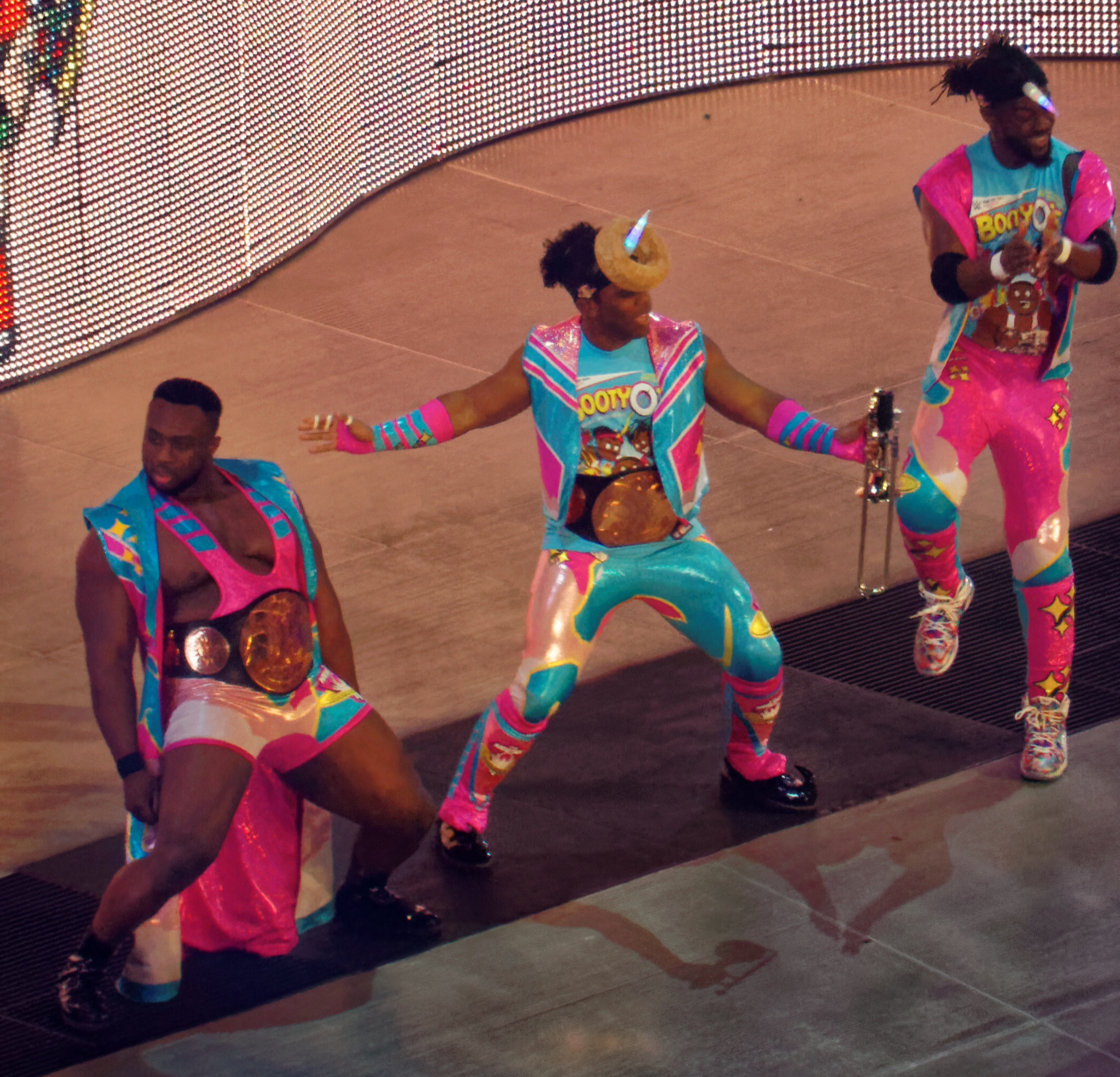
The New Day as WWE Tag Team Champions in April 2016

On the April 6, 2015, episode of Raw, The New Day turned heel, after fans responded negatively to the group. At Extreme Rules, Big E and Kingston defeated Tyson Kidd and Cesaro to win the WWE Tag Team Championship, Woods was then given a share of the title and the trio defended the titles under the Freebird Rule. At Elimination Chamber, The New Day retained the title in the first ever tag team Elimination Chamber match, where all three members were allowed to compete. At Money in the Bank, Woods and Big E lost the titles to The Prime Time Players (Titus O'Neil and Darren Young), but regain the titles at SummerSlam. The next night on Raw, The New Day were attacked by returning The Dudley Boyz, which ended with Woods being put through a table with a 3D. The New Day retained the titles against The Dudley Boyz at Night of Champions and Live from Madison Square Garden events by disqualification, and at Hell in a Cell by pinfall. The New Day retained the championship at TLC in a triple threat tag team ladder match against The Lucha Dragons and The Usos. They retained their title against The Usos at Royal Rumble.

Despite portraying heels, New Day's strong in-ring performances and entertaining segments garnered positive reactions from critics and live audiences and the trio turned face after mocking The League of Nations (Sheamus, Alberto Del Rio, King Barrett, and Rusev), as the crowd was starting to get behind them. The New Day retained the titles at Roadblock, after defeating Sheamus and King Barrett, but lost against them at WrestleMania 32 in a six-man tag team match. The New Day then retained their championship at Extreme Rules against The Vaudevillains and at the Money in the Bank against The Vaudevillains, Enzo Amore and Big Cass and Luke Gallows and Karl Anderson in a fatal four-way tag team match. On July 19, Woods, along with his fellow The New Day teammates, was drafted to Raw brand as part of WWE draft. On July 22, The New Day became the longest reigning WWE Tag Team Champions in history, breaking the record of 478 days previously set by Demolition. After SmackDown established the SmackDown Tag Team Championship after the brand split, the titles held by The New Day were renamed the Raw Tag Team Championship. They retained the titles against Gallows and Anderson at SummerSlam and Clash of Champions. On the October 31 episode of Raw, The New Day revealed that they were made captain of Team Raw for the Survivor Series tag team elimination match at Survivor Series. At the event, they were the first team eliminated although Team Raw still went on to win the match. On the November 21 episode of Raw, The New Day successfully retained their titles against Team Raw's sole survivors, Cesaro and Sheamus. At Roadblock: End of the Line, The New Day lost the Raw Tag Team Championship to Cesaro and Sheamus, ending their record-breaking championship reign at 483 days. The New Day then received a rematch, but failed to reclaim the championships. The New Day would then go on to host WrestleMania 33.

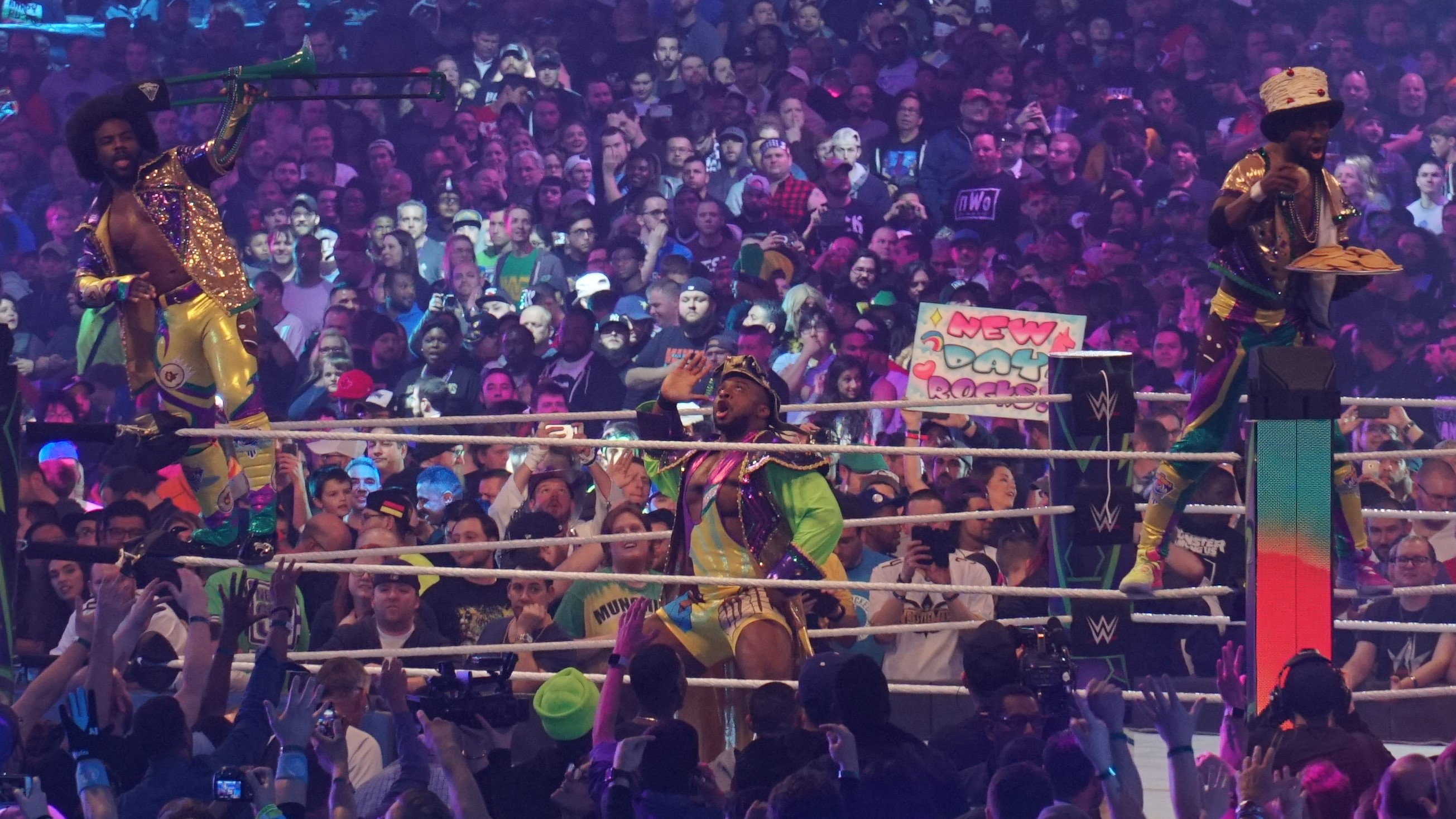
The New Day at WrestleMania 34

After the New Day were moved to the SmackDown brand as part of the Superstar Shake-up, they started a feud with The Usos, defeating them a Battleground to win the SmackDown Tag Team Championship. Despite The Usos regained the titles at SummerSlam, the New Day won the titles back on the September 12 episode of SmackDown Live in a Sin City Street Fight, but lost them again to The Usos at Hell in a Cell. The New Day failed to regain the titles from The Usos at Clash of Champions in a fatal four-way tag team match also involving the team of Chad Gable and Shelton Benjamin, and Aiden English and Rusev. Woods also participated in a tournament for the vacant United States Championship, but lost to Jinder Mahal in the semi-finals. In 2018, the New Day wrestled for the SmackDown Tag Team titles at Fastlane, and WrestleMania 34, but failed to capture the titles. At SummerSlam, The New Day won a match against The Bludgeon Brothers for the titles by disqualification, but two days later on SmackDown Live, they won the championships in a no disqualification match . On October 16, Woods and Big E lost the titles against The Bar on SmackDown 1000.

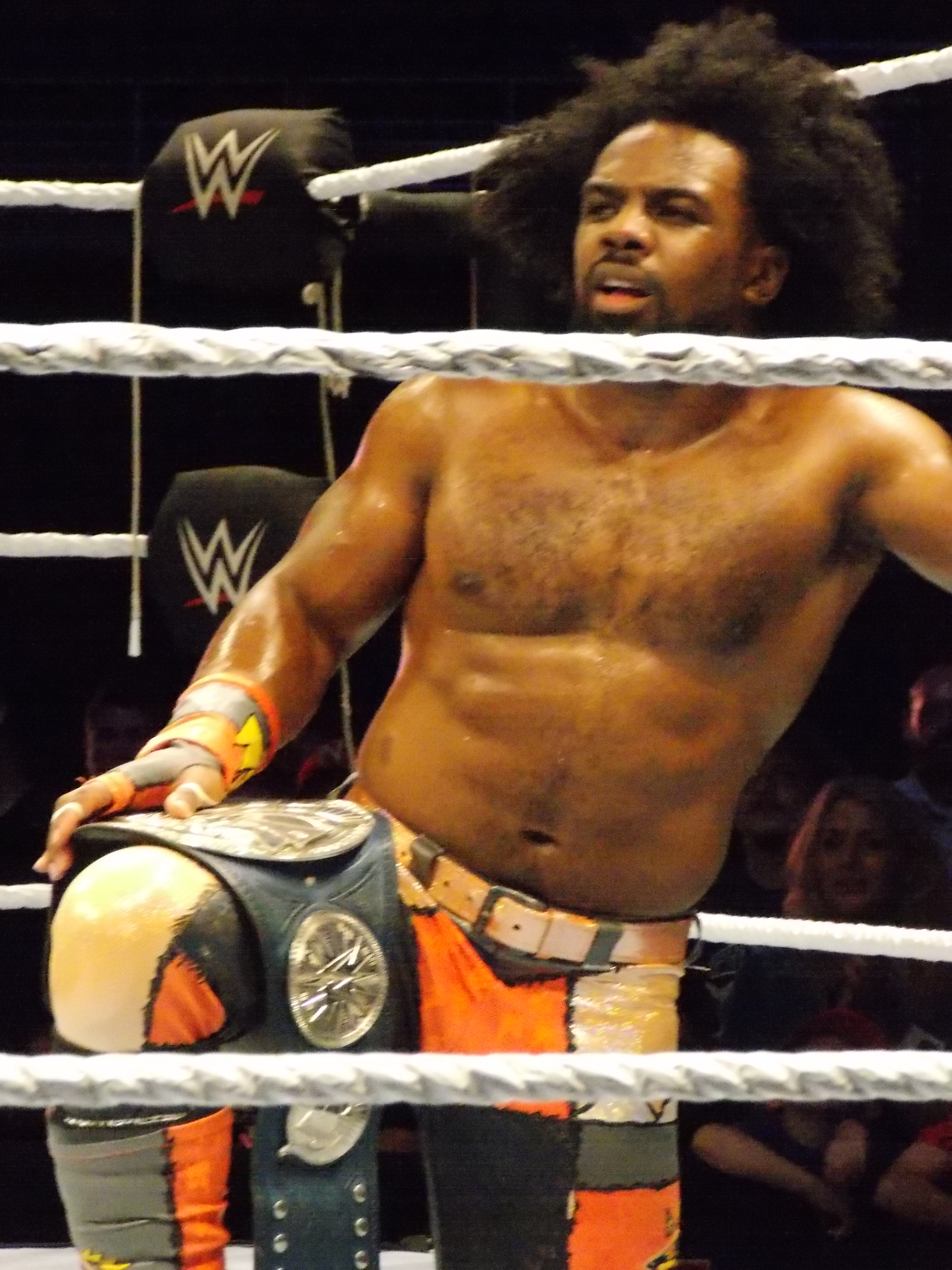
Woods in August 2019

In 2019, Woods and Big E won the SmackDown Tag Team Championship at Extreme Rules, losing to The Revival at Clash of Champions. During a WWE live event on October 21, Woods suffered a legitimate achilles injury and it was reported that the injury would sideline him for six months to a year.

On the October 9, 2020, episode of SmackDown, Woods returned from injury, where he teamed with Kingston to defeat Cesaro and Shinsuke Nakamura, winning their seventh SmackDown Tag Team Championship. After the match, as part of the 2020 Draft, Kingston and Woods were drafted to the Raw brand, splitting them from Big E, who remained on the SmackDown brand. On the October 12 episode of Raw, New Day would exchange tag team titles with Raw Tag Team Championship holders The Street Profits, who were drafted to SmackDown. On December 20, at TLC, Kingston and Woods lost the Raw Tag Team Championship to The Hurt Business (Cedric Alexander and Shelton Benjamin). Woods and Kingston then would win back the titles from Alexander and Benjamin on March 15, 2021, during the live broadcast of Raw. They would hold the championship until WrestleMania 37 where they lost the titles to AJ Styles and Omos.

As part of the 2021 Draft, Woods and Kingston were drafted to the SmackDown brand. Woods entered the 2021 King of the Ring tournament, defeating SmackDown's Finn Bálor in the final at Crown Jewel to become "King of the Ring". As part of the victory, Woods appeared ith a cape, crown, and scepter, changing his name to King Woods.

On the March 25, 2022, edition of SmackDown, Woods returned, reverting to Xavier Woods, defeating Ridge Holland in a match. Kingston & Woods then challenged Sheamus & Ridge Holland to a match at WrestleMania, but lost. On December 10, at Deadline, Woods and Kingston defeated Pretty Deadly (Elton Prince and Kit Wilson) to win NXT Tag Team Championship for the first time and also the third WWE Tag Team Triple Crown winners by winning NXT Tag Titles.

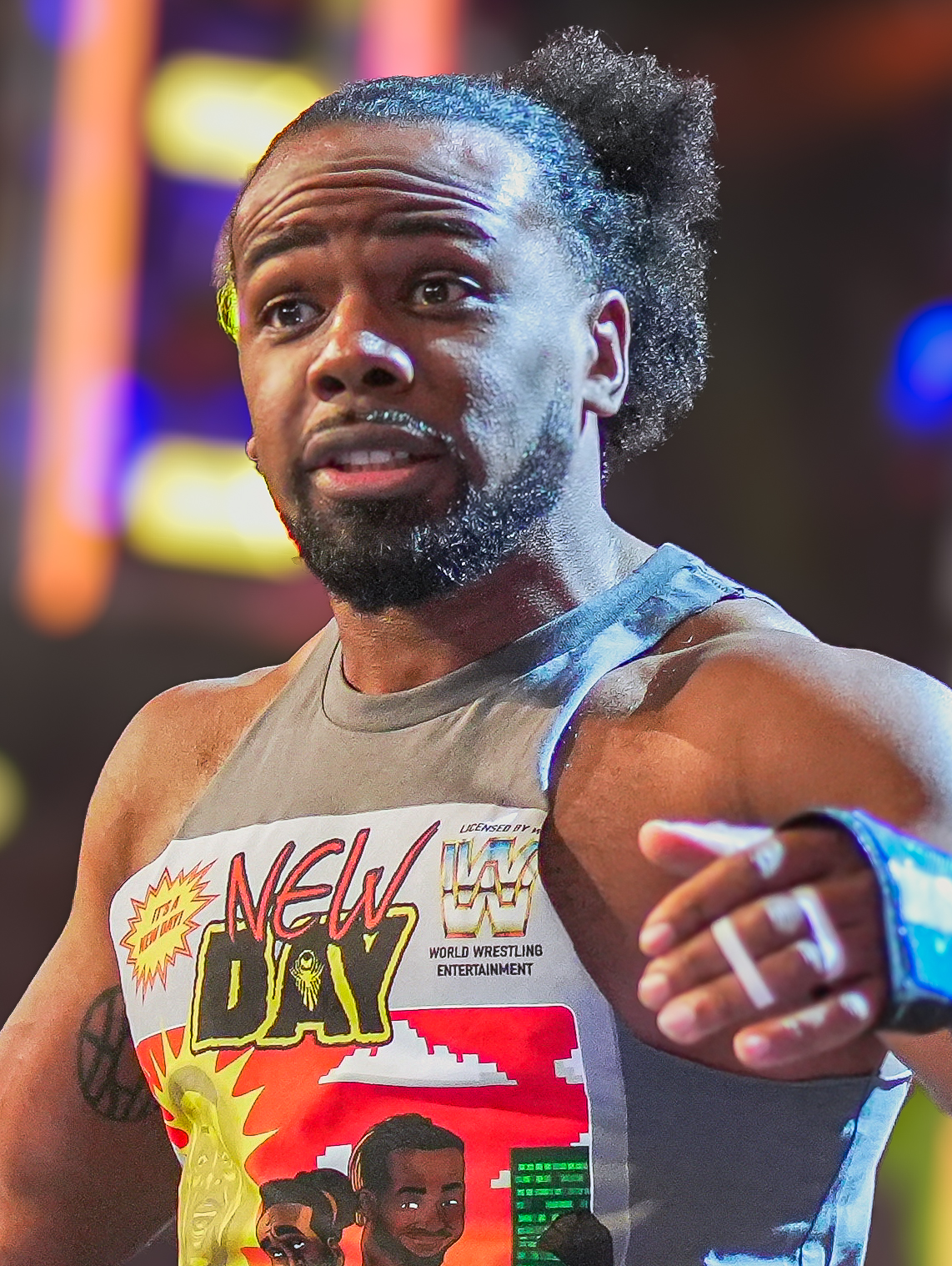
Woods in 2023

As part of the 2023 WWE Draft, Woods, along with teammate Kingston were drafted to the Raw brand. As part of the 2024 WWE Draft, The New Day remained on Raw. Woods and Kingston began feuding with Karrion Kross and his stable The Final Testament. Kross attempted to form a wedge between the two tag team competitors, claiming that Kingston was holding Woods back from having a successful singles career, leading to several on-screen and backstage bouts between the two factions. The feud concluded on the August 19 episode of Raw when The New Day and Odyssey Jones defeated The Final Testament in a Six-Man Tag Team Match. On the September 16 episode of Raw, Woods and Kingston failed to defeat The Judgment Day (Finn Bálor and JD McDonagh) for the World Tag Team Championship after the referee was distracted with the remainder of The Judgment Day ("Dirty" Dominik Mysterio and Carlito with Women's World Champion Liv Morgan) brawling with Latino World Order (LWO; Dragon Lee, Cruz Del Toro and Joaquin Wilde) at ringside. After the match, Woods was livid that Kingston had approached LWO without being consulted, driving a bigger wedge between the two. On the November 25 episode of Raw, after losing to Alpha Academy (Otis and Akira Tozawa) and many weeks of disagreements, the pair had an extremely heated argument, attacking each other's achievements in WWE. On the December 2, 2024, episode of Raw during the 10-year anniversary celebration of the formation of The New Day, Big E made an in-ring reunion with Woods and Kingston for the first time since his injury. Due to the dissension between the two throughout the year, Big E announced that he will return to manage them. However, Woods and Kingston lashed out at Big E for abandoning them after his injury in March 2022 and kicked him out of the stable, turning heel for the first time since 2016, and reconciling with one another in the process.

On April 19, 2025 at Night 1 of WrestleMania 41 , Kingston and Woods defeated The War Raiders (Erik and Ivar) to win the World Tag Team Championship, marking Woods' 12th tag team championship. On the June 30 episode of Raw, Kingston and Woods lost their titles to The Judgment Day (Finn Bálor and JD McDonagh), ending their reign at 72 days. In September, Woods underwent surgery to remove a lipoma from his head and later took time off to heal a shoulder injury five months later.

On May 2, 2026, it was reported that Woods and Kingston had mutually agreed to part ways with WWE, ending Woods' 16-year tenure with the company. It was later confirmed by both Woods and Kingston that they refused to take a pay-cut of more than 50% in their new contract offer and opted to be released from their deals.

=== All Elite Wrestling (2026–present) ===
On August 30, 2026, at All In, Watson, reverting to his Austin Creed name and as a babyface, made his All Elite Wrestling (AEW) debut alongside Kofi as The New Level, where they teamed with Swerve Strickland to win the AEW World Trios Championship in a Trios Roulette match. The trio then began a feud with former champions "Hangman" Adam Page and Brodido (Brody King and Bandido). They successfully defended their titles against Page and Brodido at All Out on September 26 before losing the titles back to them in a two-out-of-three falls match 1–2 at WrestleDream on October 17, ending their reign at 48 days. The trio regained the titles on November 14 at Full Gear in a Texas Death match to begin their record-tying second reign as a team.

== Other media ==
Woods's life was spotlighted, along with Adam Rose and Corey Graves, on ESPN's E:60 special on WWE titled "Behind the Curtain", which aired May 5, 2015. Woods was featured playing tambourine and trombone on the Postmodern Jukebox cover of "What is Love" music video.

In 2017, he published The Book of Booty: Shake It. Love It. Never Be It with fellow New Day members Big E and Kofi Kingston. Watson, along with Big E and Kofi Kingston, appeared in an episode of Adam Ruins Everything where they did a rendition of their catchphrase during a segment about Mount Rushmore.

In February 2020, Woods announced his partnership with Riot Games to create Esports experiences. On November 24, 2020, Woods was announced as one of the new hosts for the revival of G4.

In 2023, Creed featured on Mega Ran's song "The Sunset Flip" as part of the "Wrestling is Real, People Are Fake" album.

In 2024, he appeared as a background extra in Season 6 of Cobra Kai.

=== Video games ===
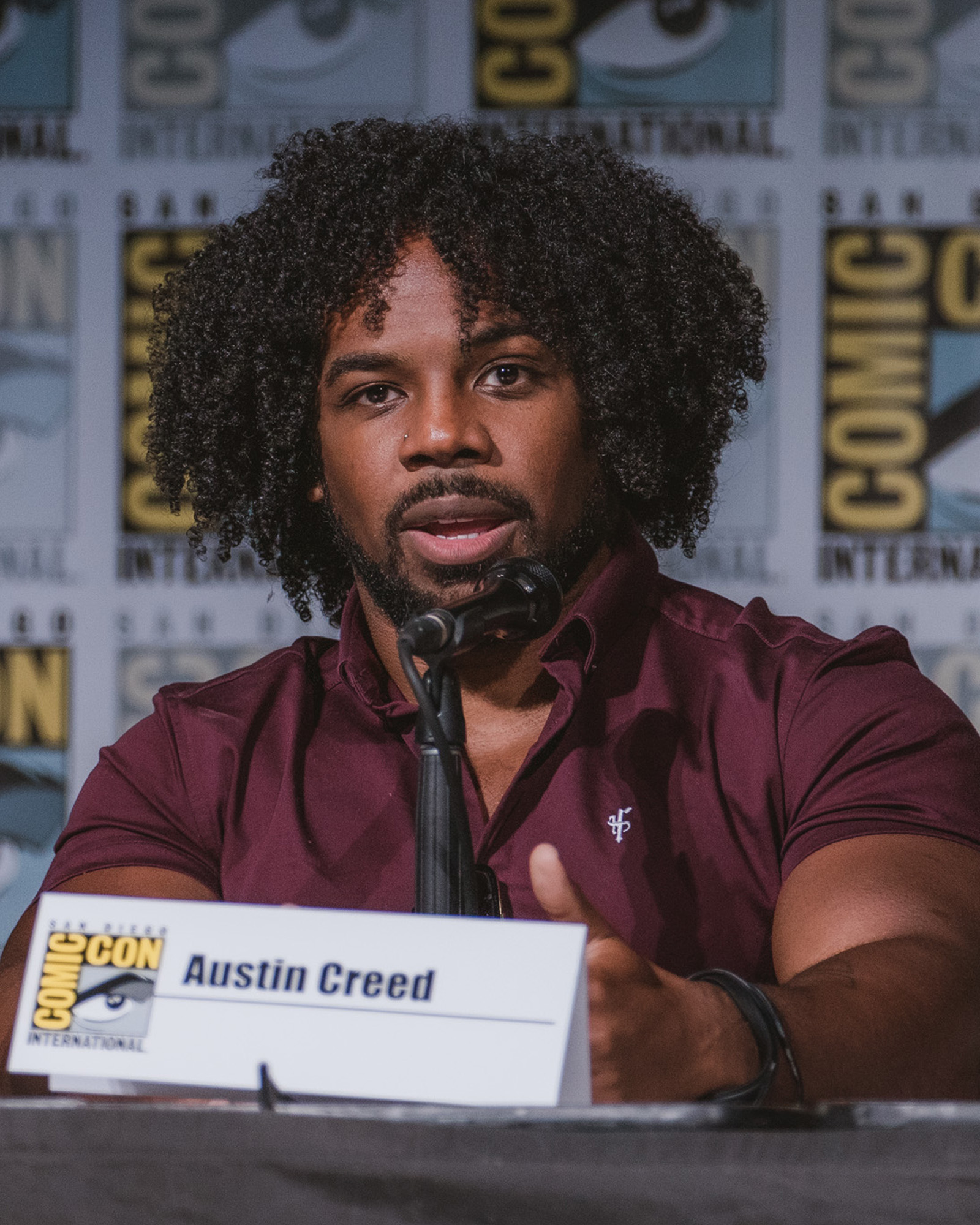
Woods at San Diego Comic-Con in July 2023

Woods's wrestling persona is playable in thirteen video games: TNA Impact!: Cross the Line as Consequences Creed, and in WWE 2K15, WWE 2K16, WWE 2K17, WWE 2K18, WWE 2K19, WWE 2K20, WWE 2K Battlegrounds, WWE 2K22, WWE 2K23, WWE 2K24, WWE 2K25, WWE 2K26 and as a crossover character in Brawlhalla, as Xavier Woods. In addition, Woods appears in Super Bomberman R and as a costume in Fall Guys. Under the Xavier Woods moniker, he played Mortal Kombat's Raiden in NetherRealm Studio's mobile game, WWE Immortals.

In 2017, Woods made his voice acting debut as the character Vincent Mensah in the video game 2064: Read Only Memories.

In November 2020, Woods, alongside fellow The New Day members Big E and Kingston, was added as playable DLC characters in the video game Gears 5, sporting custom armour in the colors of The New Day's ring attires; the three recorded dialogue specifically for the game.

In July 2023, Woods, alongside Cris Cyborg and Mike Tyson attended San Diego Comic-Con as part of the Tekken 8: The Art of Fighting panel to discuss how real-world combat and pro-wrestling inspire character movesets in the Tekken franchise.

=== Internet and web series ===
He made an appearance in fellow wrestler Emma's short-lived YouTube cooking channel Taste of Tenille in 2015. Also in 2015, Woods, under his Austin Creed moniker, started a YouTube channel called UpUpDownDown, where he invited fellow WWE performers, gaming personalities, friends, and guests to play games. In August 2018, UpUpDownDown received a Guinness World Record for Most Subscribed-to Celebrity Video Gaming Channel, with 1.6 million subscribers. Despite Woods' role as founder and host, the channel is owned by WWE, and regular uploads ceased following Woods and Kingston's departures from the company in 2026. After readopting his Austin Creed persona in AEW, Creed said in an October 2026 interview that he would "not confirm or deny" any plans for a new channel, but that building rapport in the AEW locker room first was a higher priority.

Woods and Kingston appeared on an episode of Smosh Pit's Try Not to Laugh YouTube series.

==== Actual play ====
As of 2019, Woods is a recurring cast member in Penny Arcade's actual play series Acquisitions Incorporated. In this Dungeons & Dragons campaign, he performs at various PAX conventions playing the role of Bobby Zimmeruski, a Goliath Barbarian with an obsession for violence and a deep love of cheese. In 2026 at PAX Australia, after the switch to the Daggerheart system, Woods returned to the table playing the role of Julius Smalls, a giant turtle with whose speciality is crushing skulls.

In 2025, Woods and Kingston appeared in Dropout's Dimension 20 series Titan Takedown, along with Bayley and Chelsea Green.

== Filmography ==
=== Film ===
Year	Title	Role	Notes
2021	Escape the Undertaker	Himself	Main star

=== Web ===
Year	Title	Role	Notes
2019–Present	Acquisitions Incorporated	Bobby Zimmeruski / Julius Smalls	Recurring cast member
2025	Dimension 20	Julius Mortem	Cast member, Titan Takedown

== Personal life ==
Watson has two bachelor's degrees in psychology and philosophy, and a master's in psychology. Watson is an avid fan of video games. He has a tattoo of the Wingcrest from The Legend of Zelda series on his left forearm. He also has a Twitch account under the username AustinCreed. He won the annual WWE 2K tournament in 2015.

Watson married his girlfriend in 2015, and they have one son born in 2017.

== Championships and accomplishments ==
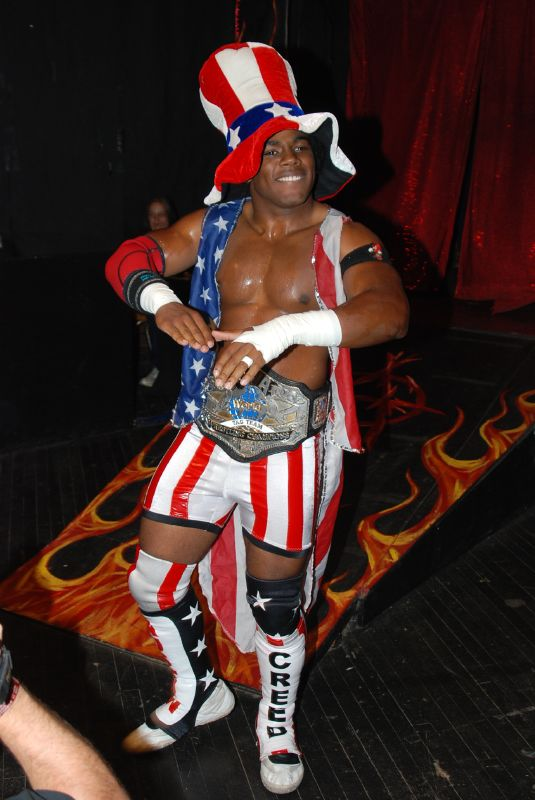
Creed is a former NWA Anarchy Tag Team Champion.

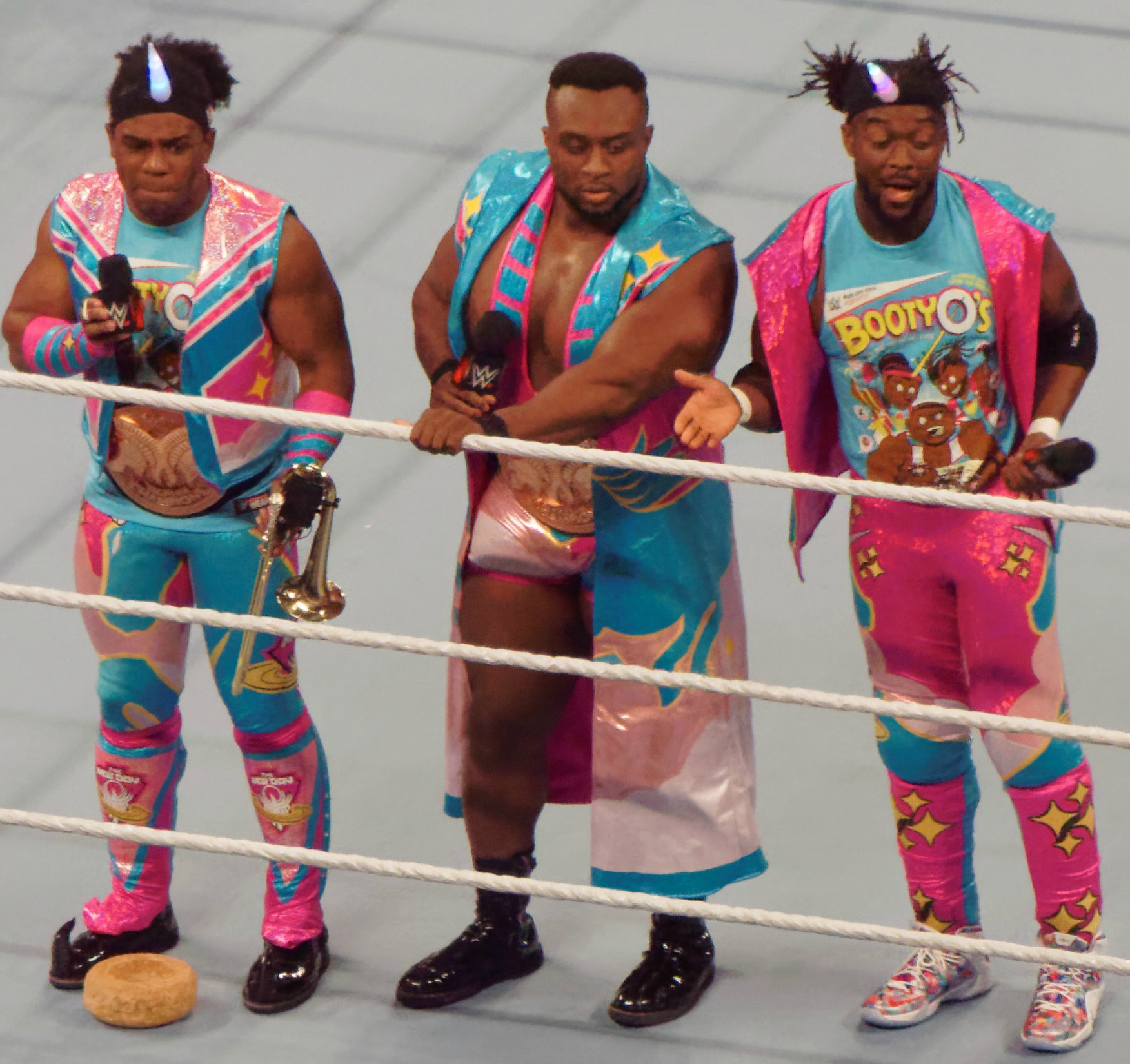
As part of The New Day, Woods is a five-time and longest-reigning World Tag Team Champion, a record seven-time SmackDown Tag Team Champion, and a one-time NXT Tag Team Champion, making him a Tag Team Triple Crown Champion and overall 13-time tag team champion in WWE.

- All Elite Wrestling
  - AEW World Trios Championship (2 times, current) – with Kofi and Swerve Strickland
- Deep South Wrestling
  - DSW Heavyweight Championship (1 time)
- East Coast Wrestling Association
  - ECWA Super 8 Tournament Champion (2010)
- Florida Championship Wrestling
  - FCW Florida Tag Team Championship (1 time) – with Wes Brisco
- NWA Anarchy
  - NWA Anarchy Tag Team Championship (1 time) – with Hayden Young
  - Most Popular Wrestler (2006)
- Pro Wrestling Illustrated
  - Tag Team of the Year (2015, 2016) with Big E and Kofi Kingston
  - Ranked No. 58 of the top 500 singles wrestlers in the PWI 500 in 2016
  - Ranked No. 8 of the top 50 tag teams in the PWI Tag Team 50 in 2020 with Big E and Kofi Kingston
- Total Nonstop Action Wrestling
  - TNA World Tag Team Championship (1 time) – with Jay Lethal
- Wrestling Observer Newsletter
  - Best Gimmick (2015) – The New Day
- WWE
  - WWE Raw/World Tag Team Championship (5 times) (Note: Big E, Kingston, and Woods defended the title under the Freebird Rule.) – with Big E and Kofi Kingston (2), and Kofi Kingston (3)
  - WWE SmackDown Tag Team Championship (7 times) (Note: Big E, Kingston, and Woods also defended the WWE SmackDown Tag Team Championships under the Freebird Rule.) – with Big E and Kofi Kingston (6), and Kofi Kingston (1)
  - NXT Tag Team Championship (1 time) – with Kofi Kingston
  - Third Tag Team Triple Crown Champion – with Kofi Kingston
  - King of the Ring (2021)
  - WWE SmackDown Tag Team Championship Tournament (2018) – with Big E and Kofi Kingston
  - WWE Speed Championship No. 1 Contender Tournament (June 19 – July 5, 2024)
  - WWE Year-End Award (1 time)
    - Men's Tag Team of the Year (2019) – with Big E and Kofi Kingston
  - Slammy Award (1 time)
    - Ring Gear of the Year (2020) – with Big E and Kofi Kingston
