= Mike Knox =

American professional wrestler (born 1978)

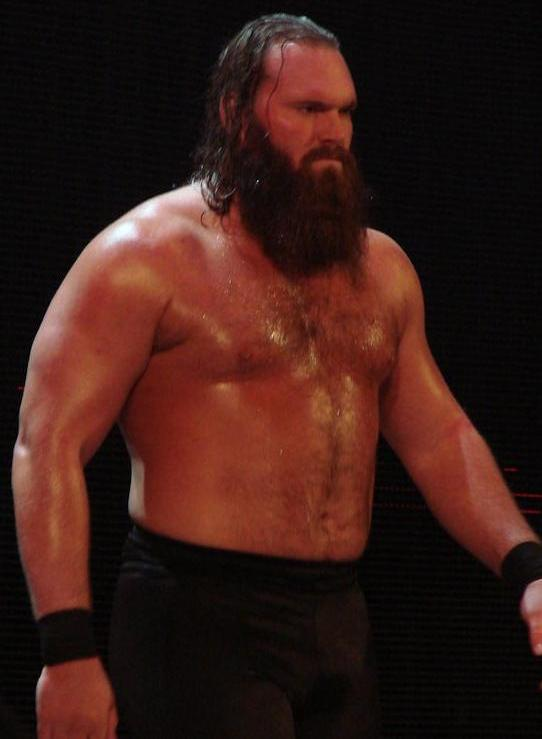
- Knox in 2009

Personal information
- Born: Michael Shawn Hettinga; July 17, 1978 (age 48) San Bernardino, California, U.S.

Professional wrestling career
- Ring name(s): Knox; Knux; Mike Hettinga; Mike Knox; Mike Knoxx; Sir Michael, Duke of Knox
- Billed height: 6 ft 6 in (198 cm)
- Billed weight: 293 lb (133 kg)
- Billed from: Phoenix, Arizona
- Trained by: Navajo Warrior
- Debut: 1998

Michael Shawn Hettinga (born July 17, 1978), better known by the ring name Mike Knox, is an American professional wrestler. He is signed to the National Wrestling Alliance (NWA), where he performs as Sir Michael, Duke of Knox. He is best known for his work in World Wrestling Entertainment (WWE), and also performed in Total Nonstop Action Wrestling (TNA) under the ring name Knux.

== Professional wrestling career ==
=== Early Career (2000–2005) ===
Hettinga worked for Ultimate Pro Wrestling (UPW) in 2000. He tagged with Samoa Joe at UPW Proving Ground on December 12, 2000, in the Galaxy Theatre of Santa Ana, California and defeated the debuting Al Katrazz with Basil. He also wrestled at UPW live against the boss Samoa Joe for the Heavyweight Championship, but was unable to win the title.

After being trained by Steve "Navajo Warrior" Islas, Knox started wrestling for Islas' organization Impact Zone Wrestling in 2002. He was booked to win the Heavyweight Championship on two occasions and the Tag Team Championship with friend and rival Derek Neikirk on one occasion.

In 2003, Knox wrestled a few matches for WWE in 2003 for their B-shows Sunday Night Heat and Velocity losing to Maven, Shannon Moore and Scott Steiner.

From October to December 2003, Knox made his debut in Japan for Pro Wrestling Zero1.

In the spring of 2005, he worked for IWA Puerto Rico.

=== World Wrestling Entertainment (2005-2010) ===
==== Deep South and Dark Matches (2005–2006) ====
Knox was signed to a World Wrestling Entertainment developmental deal in February 2005, and made a handful of appearances on WWE shows, including one appearance as a masked "jihadist" for Muhammad Hassan, in the infamous segment that led to Hassan's ousting from WWE. Twice lost to Hardcore Holly in August 2005 on Smackdown house shows. He mainly wrestled for their Atlanta, Georgia-based developmental territory, Deep South Wrestling, teaming with Derrick Neikirk as Team Elite.

==== ECW (2006–2008) ====
Knox debuted on the June 20, 2006 episode of ECW as a heel by interfering in Kelly Kelly's striptease segment, coming from the backstage area and covering her with a towel before escorting her off stage, though he was unnamed on-screen at the time. It was later revealed that Kelly was Knox's on-screen girlfriend, and he informed her that he did not appreciate her stripping in front of anyone but him. For his in-ring debut, a win over Danny Doring, Kelly accompanied him to the ringside acting as a valet. Knox was pushed strongly, interfering in matches, and squashing his opponents. He later formed a short-lived tag team with Test before starting a feud with CM Punk, after growing jealous of Kelly Kelly's admiration towards Punk. Punk won every match in the feud, including a qualifying match for December to Dismember's Extreme Elimination Chamber match for the ECW World Championship.

Knox made his pay-per-view debut at Survivor Series where he teamed up with Team Rated-RKO to take on Team DX, but was the first man eliminated after taking a superkick from Shawn Michaels, a match Team Rated-RKO would lose. Upon his elimination, he was subsequently mocked by DX, as he was virtually unknown compared to the other participants. His next pay-per-view appearance saw him abandon Kelly Kelly during a mixed tag team match against Kevin Thorn and Ariel at December to Dismember, resulting in his team's loss. He then attacked her on the next ECW episode, breaking the duo up for good.

After being taken off television, Knox returned on February 13, 2007, episode of ECW, where he lost easily to CM Punk. Knox was again taken off television for several months in order to return to Deep South Wrestling. On March 1, Knox and Derek Neikirk, the reformed Team Elite, were booked to win the Tag Team Championship after defeating the Major Brothers. After DSW closed, however, Knox was sent to WWE's Florida-based territory Florida Championship Wrestling.

Knox returned on the September 11 episode of ECW, defeating Balls Mahoney. The next week, he lost in a rematch to Mahoney. He then easily defeated Nunzio the week after. The next week Knox wrestled against ECW Champion CM Punk, again losing to Punk after a Go To Sleep from Punk. After months without any notable storylines, he began a feud with Tommy Dreamer whom he defeated in a series of matches, including an Extreme Rules match on the 100th episode of ECW. He then began a feud with Finlay. After weeks of confrontations between the two, they finally had a match on the August 26 edition of ECW, where they had an ECW Championship scramble qualifying match, which was won by Finlay.

==== Brand switches (2008–2010) ====
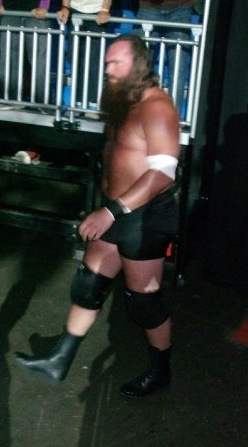
Mike Knox at a Puerto Rico house show

On the October 27 and November 3, 2008, episodes of Raw, two vignettes were aired to promote Knox's arrival on the Raw brand. Knox's look drastically changed as well from his previous clean-cut look to long unkempt hair and a long beard. Knox debuted the following week, on November 10, defeating D-Lo Brown. Knox attacked Rey Mysterio two times over a period of three weeks. After losing to Mysterio, Knox attacked Mysterio once again. Interviewer Todd Grisham asked Knox why he attacked Mysterio and Knox answered saying he did not know why, stating that he has nothing personal against Rey. In a house show at Cape Girardeau, Missouri, Knox won a battle royal to become an entrant at the World Heavyweight Championship Elimination Chamber match at No Way Out. At No Way Out, he was eliminated by Chris Jericho and was the second competitor eliminated overall.

On April 15, Knox was drafted to the SmackDown brand as part of the 2009 Supplemental Draft. Knox made his debut for the brand on the May 8, 2009 episode of SmackDown, defeating R-Truth in a singles match. This was Knox's last win on television for WWE; from late May 2009 until his release in April 2010, Knox lost all the 30 televised matches he wrestled on either SmackDown or WWE Superstars, whether it be in singles, tag, or multi-man matches. On the August 14 episode of SmackDown, Knox debuted new elements to his character that included knowledge of biology and the human anatomy, using this knowledge to methodically inflict pain upon his opponents. Knox's final match was a loss to JTG on the April 23, 2010 edition of SmackDown, on the same day WWE announced that Knox had been released from his contract.

In 2016, WWE offered a new deal to Knox for a full-time performer, but he declined as he didn't want to take the risk getting injured.

=== Return to independent circuit (2010–2015) ===
Mike Knox competed against Corporal Robinson and Raven at JCW Bloodymania IV. Corporal Robinson won the match. In July 2012, he wrestled three times at American Pro Wrestling Alliance, winning the APWA Hardcore Cup. On October 6, 2012, Knox wrestled in the main event of House of Hardcore's first show as Mike Knoxx, losing to Carlito in a three-way match for the FWE Heavyweight Championship, which also included Tommy Dreamer. He won the American Pro Wrestling Alliance World Tag Team Championship in 2012 with D.O.C., but they were later stripped of the titles, as they were made inactive, on March 1, 2013. He appeared for Pro Wrestling Syndicate with D.O.C, and D'Lo Brown on May 18, 2013. On June 18, 2013, he won the River City Wrestling Tag Team Championships. D.O.C. and Knux lost the RCW Tag Team Championships on September 7, 2013, to Hernandez and Michael Faith. on November 16, 2014, Knox competed for Alpha Omega Wrestling (AOW) where Knox lost to Jerome Robinson by disqualification. on March 20, 2015, Knox faced AOW heavyweight champion Blake Grayson for the title but lost the match.

=== Total Nonstop Action Wrestling ===
==== Aces and Eights (2012–2013) ====
In May 2012, Knox competed in a dark match for Total Nonstop Action Wrestling (TNA) against the Television Champion Devon. Successively Knux began working as a masked member of the Aces & Eights stable. At Bound for Glory, D.O.C. and Knux (still masked) defeated Bully Ray and Sting to gain full access to the Impact Zone.

Knox made his official television debut on the January 3, 2013, episode of Impact Wrestling, being revealed as a member of the villainous Aces & Eights stable after being unmasked by Kurt Angle. Knox gained his revenge on Angle the following week, hitting him in the neck with a ball-peen hammer. After Angle was stretchered away, Knox lost his debut match to Sting and was afterwards, attacked with his own hammer. On March 10 at Lockdown, Aces & Eights, consisting of Knox, now billed as Knux, Devon, D.O.C., Garett Bischoff, and Mr. Anderson were defeated by Team TNA, consisting of Eric Young, James Storm, Magnus, Samoa Joe, and Sting in a Lethal Lockdown match, with Young pinning Knux for the win. On March 18, 2013, Knux was part of the World Cup of Wrestling, teaming with D.O.C., in a winning effort against Petey Williams and Funaki. On March 19, 2013, Knux took part in a six-man tag team match at a Hardcore Justice 2, teaming with D.O.C. and Wes Brisco, in a losing effort, being defeated by James Storm, Hardcore Holly, and Magnus. On the November 21 edition of Turning Point, Knux, Garett Bischoff, Bully Ray, and Taz (remaining members of Aces & Eights) were forced to disband the Aces & Eights after Bully Ray lost a match against Mr. Anderson with their memberships on the line against the TNA career of Mr. Anderson.

==== The Menagerie (2014–2015) ====
In March 2014, Knux started a new storyline where he returns to his flood-ravaged hometown with his father's carnival having been ruined and the relationship with his father soured because Knux has no intention to follow his father's footsteps and to own the family operated carnival, as well as salvaging it. The following month, Knux debuted his new stable called The Menagerie, composed of himself, Rebel, Crazzy Steve and The Freak. On the May 8 episode of Impact Wrestling, he would defeat Kazarian in his return match. On the September 24 edition of Impact Wrestling, Knux took part in the Gold Rush tournament for a potential title opportunity facing Austin Aries in a losing effort. on the November 12 edition of Impact Wrestling, Knux, Crazzy Steve and Rebel defeated Angelina Love, Velvet Sky, and Jessie Godderz in an inter-gender elimination match. on December 5 at Victory Road, The Menagerie (Knux and The Freak) faced James Storm and Kazarian in a losing effort in a Tag team match to qualify for the Gauntlet Battle Royal match later that night. on February 16, 2015, at TNA Classic, Knux competed in a 16-man tournament where the winner will be crowned the winner of the TNA Classic. Knux defeated Kenny King but lost to Rockstar Spud in the following round. On March 6 at Joker's Wild III, Knux and Tyrus faced Ethan Carter III and Crazzy Steve in a losing effort. On March 6 (Taped February 14) at Knockouts Knockdown 3, The Menagerie (Knux, Crazzy Steve, Rebel) defeated The BroMans (Jessie Godderz, Robbie E) and Angelina Love in a Six-person intergender tag team match. On May 19, 2015, Knux officially left TNA.

=== Inoki Genome Federation (2015) ===
On April 11, 2015, Hettinga, working under the ring name Knux, made his debut for Japanese promotion Inoki Genome Federation, losing to Wang Bin. He picked up his first win in the promotion on May 5 over Daichi Hashimoto. On June 27, Knux formed an "anti-IGF" stable with Hideki Suzuki, Erik Hammer and Kevin Kross.

=== Continental Wrestling Entertainment ===
Around 2016, he wrestled for The Great Khali's promotion, Continental Wrestling Entertainment (CWE) in a series of 'The Great Khali returns'.

=== National Wrestling Alliance (2021–present) ===
==== Various feuds (2021–2023) ====
On November 9, 2021, in the second part of NWA Power: By Any Means Necessary, Mike Knox made his in-company debut by attacking NWA World's Heavyweight Champion Trevor Murdoch in steel cage during event. On November 16, 2021, in NWA Power, it was announced that Knox would face Murdoch for the NWA World's Heavyweight Championship at Hard Times 2. On December 4, 2021, in the Hard Times 2, Knox was defeated by Trevor Murdoch and failed to win the title.

During night one of the Crockett Cup, Knox teamed with VSK under the name "The Cardonas" to compete in the namesake tournament, defeating Da Pope and Mims in the first round and The Fixers (Jay Bradley and Wrecking Ball Legursky) in the quarterfinals but lost to The Briscoe Brothers (Jay Briscoe and Mark Briscoe) in the semifinal on night two. On the June 14 episode of NWA Powerrr, Knox and VSK confronted Bully Ray. Knox initially acted in kind to Ray, due to their past as members of Aces & Eights in Impact Wrestling. However, after accusing Ray of "leaving him high and dry" in Impact, Knox and VSK would attack him before putting him through a table. On August 27 at NWA 74th Anniversary Show, Knox was defeated by Ray in a Tables match.

==== Alliance with Trevor Murdoch (2023–present) ====
On the March 21 episode of NWA Powerrr, Knox saved Trevor Murdoch from Daisy Kill and Talos. On April 7 at NWA 312 Pre-Show, Knox and Murdoch defeated Daisy Kill and Talos. On the April 25 episode of NWA Powerrr, Knox and Murdoch defeated The Fixers (Jay Bradley & Wrecking Ball Legursky) in a Crockett Cup 2023 qualifying match. Knox and Murdoch defeated Magnum Muscle (Dak Draper and Mims) in the second round, The Mortons (Ricky Morton and Kerry Morton) in the quarterfinal, The Midnight Riders (Tyrus and Chris Adonis) in the semifinal and Blunt Force Trauma (Carnage and Damage) in the tournament final, winning the Crockett Cup.

On September 3, 2024 at NWA Back to the Territories, Knox and Murdoch defeated Blunt Force Trauma (Carnage and Damage) to win the NWA World Tag Team Championship for the first time.

== Championships and accomplishments ==
- Alpha Omega Wrestling
  - Valley Rumble (2016)
- American Pro Wrestling Alliance
  - APWA Hardcore Cup Championship (1 time)
  - APWA World Tag Team Championship (1 time) – with D.O.C.
- Deep South Wrestling
  - DSW Tag Team Championship (1 time) – with Derek Neikirk
- Impact Zone Wrestling
  - IZW Heavyweight Championship (2 times)
  - IZW Tag Team Championship (1 time) – with Derek Neikirk
- National Wrestling Alliance
  - NWA World Tag Team Championship (1 time) - with Trevor Murdoch
  - Crockett Cup (2023) – with Trevor Murdoch
  - NWA Year End Awards
    - Tag Team of the Year (2025) with Trevor Murdoch
- Pro Wrestling Illustrated
  - PWI Feud of the Year (2012) Aces & Eights vs. TNA
  - PWI ranked him #87 of the top 500 singles wrestlers in the PWI 500 in 2009
- River City Wrestling
  - RCW Tag Team Championship (1 time) – with D.O.C
- Western States Wrestling
  - WSW Heavyweight Championship (1 time)
- Wrestling Observer Newsletter awards
  - Worst Gimmick (2012, 2013) Aces & Eights
