= List of NWA World Women's Tag Team Champions =

The NWA World Women's Tag Team Championship is a women's professional wrestling tag team championship defended in member promotions of the National Wrestling Alliance (NWA). The title was created September 11, 1952, and the inaugural champions are Ella Waldek and Mae Young.

As of November 7, 2026, there have been 51 reigns, between 56 wrestlers, 37 teams and one vacancy. Ella Waldek and Mae Young are the inaugural champions. June Byers holds the record for most recognized reigns at 7. Joyce Grable has the most combined days as champion at a record-setting 2,095 days.

The current champions are Liviyah and Mackenzie Morgan, who are in their first reign as a team and individually. They won the titles by defeating previous champions Pretty Empowered (Kenzie Paige and Kylie Paige) in a two out of three falls match on August 22, 2026 at the NWA Powerrr tapings (aired October 31, 2026) in Tampa, Florida.

== Reigns ==
=== Names ===
Name	Year
NWA Women's Tag Team Championship	September 11, 1952 – May 23, 1983
NWA World Women's Tag Team Championship	August 28, 2021 – present

Key
No.	Overall reign number
Reign	Reign number for the specific team—reign numbers for the individuals are in parentheses, if different
Days	Number of days held

No.	Champion	Championship change			Reign statistics		Notes	Ref.
No.	Champion	Date	Event	Location	Reign	Days	Notes	Ref.
National Wrestling Alliance (NWA)
1	Ella Waldek and Mae Young	N/A	N/A	N/A	1	(Note: The length of the reign is too uncertain to calculate.)	Records are unclear as to whom Waldek and Young had defeated to win the championship.	
2	June Byers and Millie Stafford	September 4, 1952 (nlt) (Note: Indicates that a title change took place "no later than" the date listed. Documentation of the specific date of a title change is not found but documentation of the champion holding the title on that date/in that period.)	Live event	Mexico City, Mexico	1	134 (Note: The length of this reign may be inaccurate.)	Due to conflicted reports, it is unclear how Byers and Stafford won the championship. The Jersey Journal reported that the pair won a tournament which lasted for six months to win the titles, while Arizona Daily Star claimed that they won the titles "in the recent Florida tourney". One source from the Omaha World-Herald claimed that Byers and Stafford defeated Ella Waldek and Mae Young in Mexico City, Mexico, to win the titles.	
3	June Byers and Mary Jane Mull	December 1952	Live event	Nebraska	1 (2, 1)	(Note: The date the championship was lost is uncertain, which means that the reign lasted between 37 and 67 days.)	Millie Stafford had taken time off due to personal reasons. Mull had previously won a tournament to replace her.	
4	Daisy Mae and Golden Venus	March 1953	Live event	N/A	1		Mae and Venus were recognized as champions in West Virginia.	
Championship history is unrecorded from March to September 1953.
5	Carol Cook and Ruth Boatcallie	September 1953 (nlt)	Live event	N/A	1	(Note: The date the championship was lost is uncertain, which means that the reign lasted between 75 and 104 days.)	Boatcallie and Cook were recognized as champions at Alabama and Tennessee.	
6	June Byers and Mary Jane Mull	December 14, 1953	Live event	Birmingham, AB	2 (3, 2)	(Note: The date the championship was vacated is uncertain, which means that the reign lasted between 230 and 260 days.)		
—	Vacated	August 1954	—	—	—	—	The championship was vacated after June Byers had won the NWA World Women's title.	
7	June Byers and Millie Stafford	December 7, 1954 (nlt)	Live event	N/A	2 (4, 2)		Stafford returned sometimes after June 24, 1954. Byers and Stafford recognized as champions as of May 11, 1955.	
8	Lorraine Johnson and Penny Banner	1955	Live event	Ohio	1		Banner and Johnson won a tournament to be crowned the champions. It isn't known who they defeated to win the titles.	
Championship history is unrecorded from 1955 to March 1956.
9	Daisy Mae and Golden Venus	March 1956	Live event	West Virginia	2	(Note: The exact date the championship was won and lost is uncertain, which means the reign lasted between 123 and 182 days.)	Mae and Venus were recognized as champions in West Virginia.	
Championship history is unrecorded from March to before July 30, 1956.
10	Bonnie Watson and Penny Banner	July 30, 1956 (nlt)	Live event	N/A	1 (1, 2)			
Championship history is unrecorded from before July 30 to before August 15, 1956.
11	June Byers and Mars Bennett	August 15, 1956 (nlt)	Live event	N/A	1 (5, 1)			
Championship history is unrecorded from before August 15, 1956 to before February 1957.
12	Betty Jo Hawkins and Penny Banner	February 1957	N/A	N/A	1 (1, 3)			
13	Barbara Baker and June Byers	February 13, 1957	Live event	Vancouver, BC	1 (1, 6)			
Championship history is unrecorded from February 13 to July 1957.
14	Betty Jo Hawkins and Penny Banner	July 1957 (nlt)	Live event	N/A	2 (2, 4)			
15	June Byers and Ethel Johnson	July 9, 1957	Live event	N/A	1 (7, 1)			
Championship history is unrecorded from July 9, 1957 to before February 2, 1958.
16	Lorraine Johnson and Millie Stafford	February 2, 1958	Live event	Joplin, MO	1 (2, 3)			
Championship history is unrecorded from before February 2 to before June 16, 1958.
17	Lorraine Johnson and Penny Banner	June 16, 1958 (nlt)	Live event	N/A	2 (3, 5)		Records are unclear as to whom Banner and Johnson had defeated. It is possible that Banner replaced Millie Stafford.	
Championship history is unrecorded from before June 16 to December 4, 1958.
18	Kay Noble and Lolita Martinez	December 4, 1958	Live event	Amarillo, TX	1		As of February 24, 1959, Penny Banner is listed as a co-holder of the title, since she wasn't involved in losing it.	
Championship history is unrecorded from December 4, 1958 to before November 23, 1961.
19	Adrienne Ames and Pat Lyda	November 23, 1961 (nlt)	Live event	Harvey, LA	1		Ames and Lyda were billed as "NWA titlists" when they defeated Chris Clark and Ann Regan (holders of the Southern Women's Tag Team Championship) to become "undisputed women's tag team champions".	
Championship history is unrecorded from before November 23, 1961 to before November 2, 1967.
20	The Fabulous Moolah and Patty Nelson	November 2, 1967 (nlt)	N/A	N/A	1		Moolah and Nelson were billed as champions in Boston, MA.	
Championship history is unrecorded from before November 2, 1967 to before May 1970.
21	The Fabulous Moolah and Toni Rose	May 1970 (nlt)	Live event	N/A	1 (2, 1)	(Note: The date the championship was won is uncertain, which means that the reign lasted between <1 and 15 days.)	Records are unclear as to whom Moolah and Rose had defeated. It is possible that they defeated Adrienne Ames and Pat Lyda.	
22	Donna Christanello and Kathy O'Day	May 15, 1970	Live event	Los Angeles, CA	1	21		
23	The Fabulous Moolah and Toni Rose	June 5, 1970	Live event	Bakersfield, CA	2 (3, 2)			
Championship history is unrecorded from June 5 to before October 2, 1970.
24	Donna Christanello and Toni Rose	October 2, 1970 (nlt)	Live event	N/A	1 (2, 3)		Records are unclear as to whom Christanello and Rose had defeated, if anyone. It is possible that Christantello replaced The Fabulous Moolah.	
25	Sandy Parker and Susan Green	November 21, 1971	Live event	Honolulu, HI	1	3		
26	Donna Christanello and Toni Rose	November 27, 1971	Live event	Honolulu, HI	2 (3, 4)	688	Other report by Bleacher Report claims that Christanello and Rose won the championship in February 1972 in Hong Kong, China.	
27	Joyce Grable and Vicki Williams	October 15, 1973	Live event	New York City, New York	1	677		
28	Donna Christanello and Toni Rose	August 23, 1975	Live event	Boston, MA	3 (4, 5)	554		
29	Joyce Grable and Vicki Williams	February 27, 1977	Live event	St. Petersburg, FL	2		Other report by Bleacher Report claims that Christanello and Rose won the championship on April 16, 1978.	
Championship history is unrecorded from February 27, 1977 or April 16, 1978 to August 1978.
30	Beverly Shade and Natasha the Hatchet Lady	August 1978	Live event	Memphis, TN	1	(Note: The date the championship was won is uncertain, which means that the reign lasted between <1 and 22 days.)	Beverly and Natasha were only recognized as champions in Memphis, TN.	
31	Judy Martin and Leilani Kai	August 23, 1978	Live event	Key West, FL	1	2	It is uncertain who Kai and Martin defeated to win the championship.	
32	Joyce Grable and Vicki Williams	August 25, 1978	Live event	St. Petersburg, FL	3			
Championship history is unrecorded from August 25, 1978 to before December 26, 1979.
33	Judy Martin and Leilani Kai	December 26, 1979 (nlt)	Live event	N/A	2	126	It is uncertain who Kai and Martin defeated to win the championship.	
34	Joyce Grable and Wendi Richter	April 30, 1980	Live event	Springfield, MO	1 (4, 1)	729		
35	Princess Victoria and Sabrina	April 29, 1982	Live event	Kansas City, MO	1	7		
36	Joyce Grable and Wendi Richter	May 6, 1982	Live event	Kansas City, MO	2 (5, 2)	372		
37	Penny Mitchell and Velvet McIntyre	May 13, 1983	Live event	Calgary, AB	1	10		
38	Joyce Grable and Wendi Richter	May 23, 1983	Live event	Vancouver, BC	3 (6, 3)	317 (Note: The days recognize the end of the reign as April 4, 1984, the time the first title defense was recorded, in WWF.)	Grable and Richter might have won the championship on May 17 in Regina, SK.	
—	Deactivated	April 4, 1984	—	—	—	—	The championship was sold to the World Wrestling Federation (WWF) who established the WWF Women's Tag Team Championship, using the same belts and recognizing Velvet McIntyre and Princess Victoria as the inaugural champions. April 4, 1984, is the date of the first known title defense under the WWF.	
National Wrestling Alliance/Lightning One Inc.
39	The Hex (Allysin Kay and Marti Belle)	August 28, 2021	NWA EmPowerrr	St. Louis, MO	1	287	Defeated Red Velvet and KiLynn King in a tournament final to win the revived titles.	
40	Pretty Empowered (Ella Envy and Kenzie Paige)	June 11, 2022	Alwayz Ready	Knoxville, TN	1	245		
41	Renegade Twins (Charlette Renegade and Robyn Renegade)	February 11, 2023	Nuff Said	Tampa Bay, FL	1	1		
42	Pretty Empowered 2.0 (Ella Envy and Roxy)	February 12, 2023	NWA Powerrr	Tampa Bay, FL	1 (2, 1)	<1		
43	M95 (Madi Wrenkowski and Missa Kate)	February 12, 2023	NWA Powerrr	Tampa Bay, FL	1	196	Aired on February 21, 2023. This was their Champions Series cash-in match.	
44	Pretty Empowered (Ella Envy and Kylie Paige)	August 27, 2023	NWA 75th Anniversary Show	St. Louis, MO	1 (3, 1)	139		
45	The King Bees (Charity King and Danni Bee)	January 13, 2024	Paranoia	Fort Lauderdale, FL	1	231	Aired on tape delay on February 27, 2024.	
46	The It Girls (Ella Envy and Miss Star)	August 31, 2024	NWA 76	Philadelphia, PA	1 (4, 1)	105	Aired on tape delay on October 22, 2024 as a special episode of Powerrr.	
47	Big Mama and Kenzie Paige	December 14, 2024	Looks That Kill	Dothan, AL	1 (1, 2)	98	Aired on tape delay on February 11, 2025 as a special episode of Powerrr. Kylie Paige was originally scheduled to compete, but due to a shoulder injury, Kenzie Paige took her place.	
48	TVMA (Tiffany Nieves and Valentina Rossi)	March 22, 2025	Hard Times V	Dothan, AL	1	266	Aired on tape delay on June 24, 2025 as a special episode of Powerrr.	
49	The Hex (Allysin Kay and Marti Belle)	December 13, 2025	NWA Powerrr	St. Louis, MO	2	133	Aired on tape delay on February 10, 2026.	
50	Pretty Empowered (Kenzie Paige and Kylie Paige)	April 25, 2026	NWA Powerrr	Tampa, FL	1 (3, 2)	119	This was a triple threat tag team match also involving Haley J and Clara Carter. Kylie Paige pinned Carter to win the title. Aired on tape delay on June 13, 2026.	
51	Liviyah and Mackenzie Morgan	August 22, 2026	NWA Powerrr	Tampa, FL	1	77+	This was a two out of three falls match. Aired on tape delay on October 31, 2026.	

== Combined reigns ==
As of November 7, 2026.

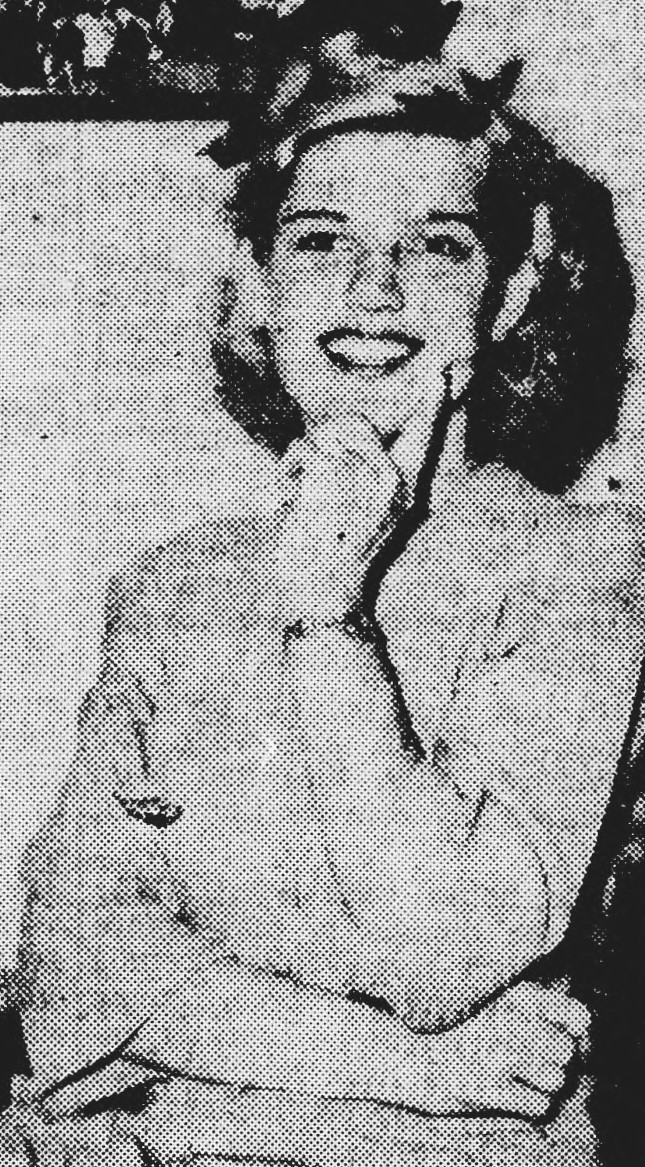
One-half of the Inaugural NWA Women's Tag Team Champions Mae Young

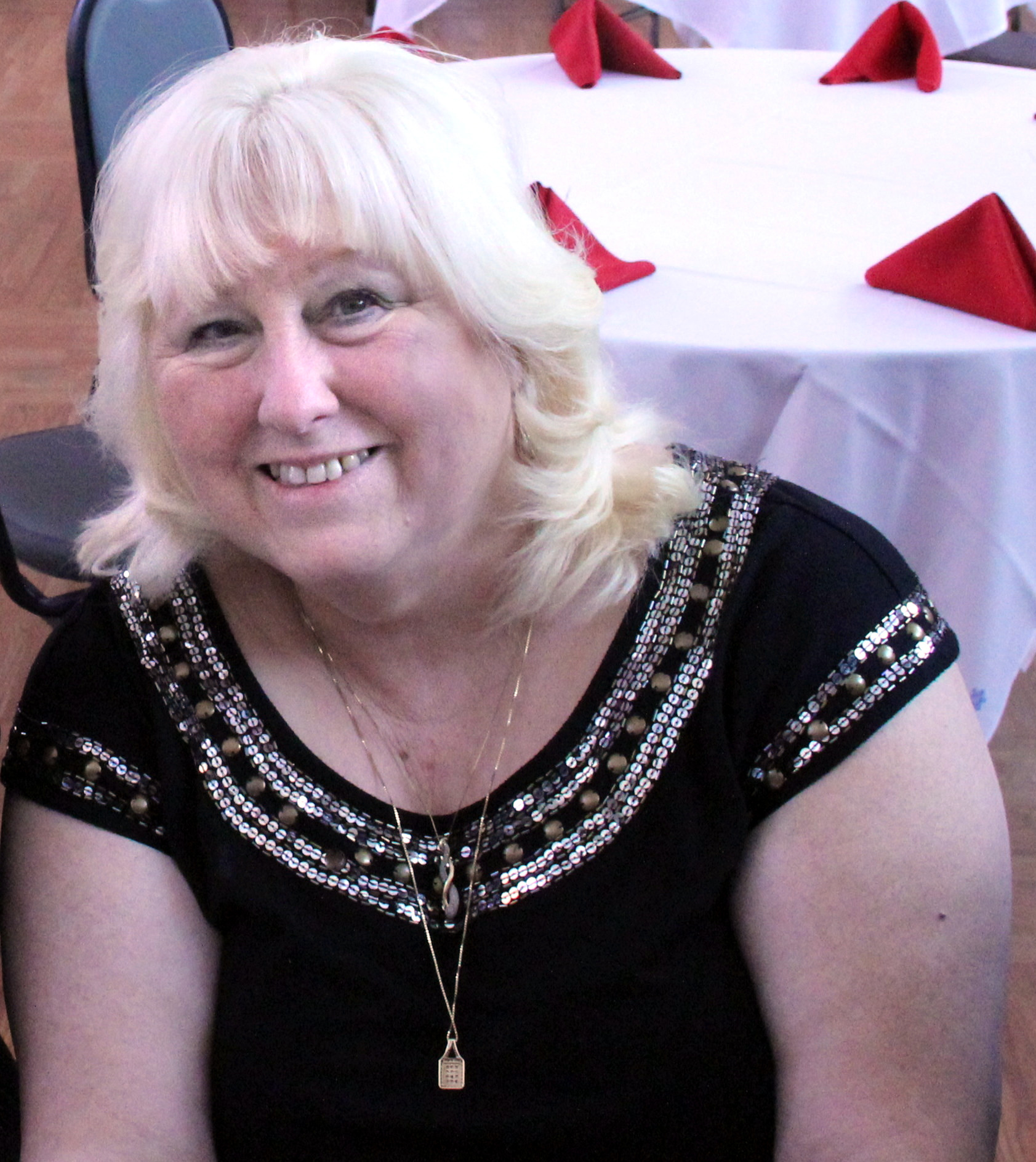
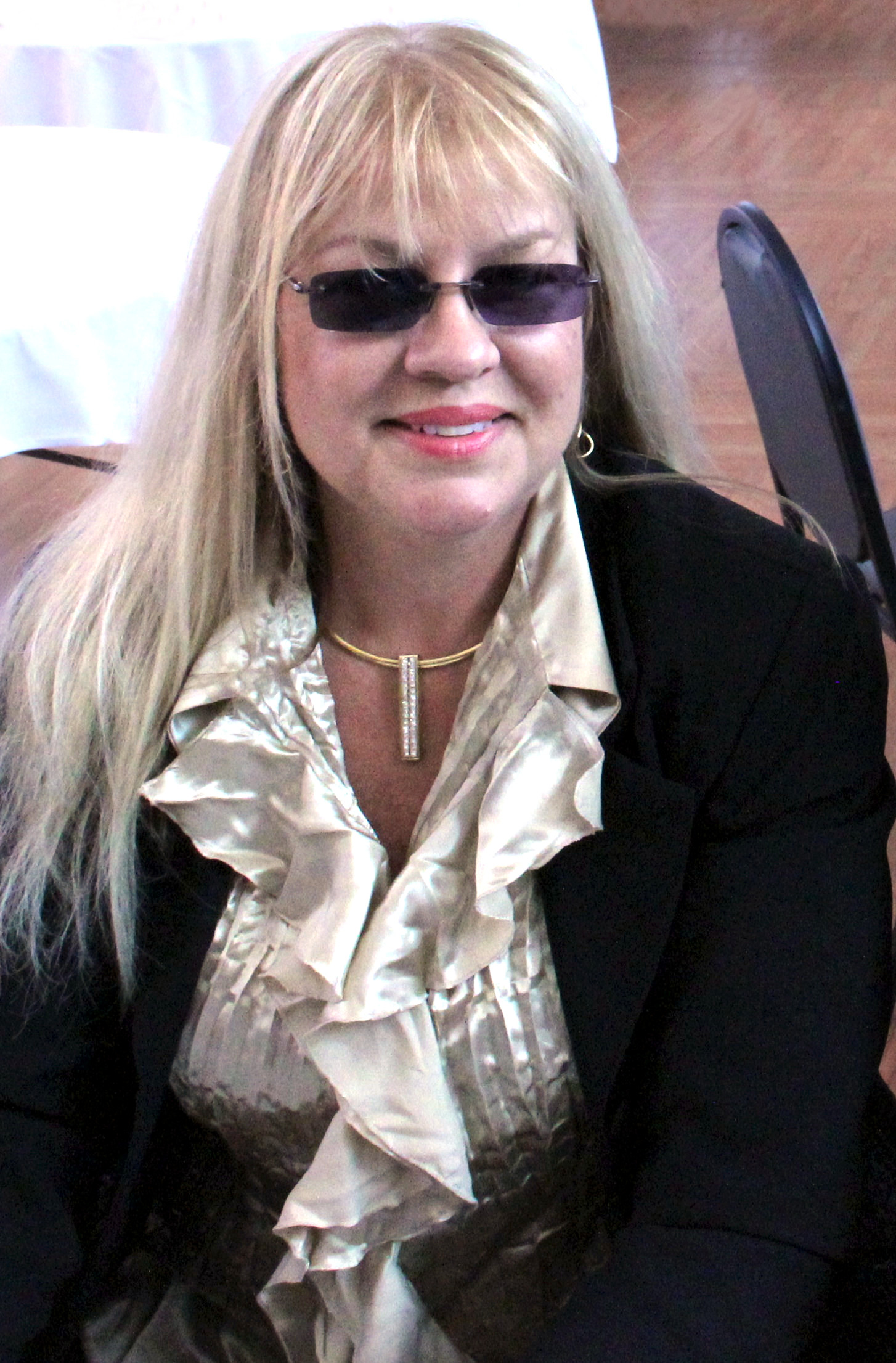
3-time and record setting most combined days as NWA Women's Tag Team Champions at 1,418 days Joyce Grable and Wendi Richter

=== By team ===
†	Indicates the current champions
¤	The exact length of a title reign is uncertain; the combined length may not be correct.
N/A	The exact length of a title reign is too uncertain to calculate.

Rank	Team	No. of reigns	Combined days
1	Joyce Grable and Wendi Richter	3	1,418¤
2	Donna Christanello and Toni Rose	3	1,242¤
3	Joyce Grable and Vicki Williams	3	677¤
4	The Hex (Allysin Kay and Marti Belle)	2	420
5	June Byers and Mary Jane Mull	2	267–327¤
6	TVMA (Tiffany Nieves and Valentina Rossi)	1	266
7	Pretty Empowered (Ella Envy and Kenzie Paige)	1	246
8	The King Bees (Charity King and Danni Bee)	1	231
9	M95 (Madi Wrenkowski and Missa Kate)	1	196
10	Pretty Empowered (Ella Envy and Kylie Paige)	1	139
11	June Byers and Millie Stafford	2	134¤
12	Judy Martin and Leilani Kai	2	128¤
13	Daisy Mae and Golden Venus	2	123–182¤
14	Pretty Empowered (Kenzie Paige and Kylie Paige)	1	119
15	The It Girls (Ella Envy and Miss Starr)	1	105
16	Carol Cook and Ruth Boatcallie	1	75–104¤
17	Big Mama and Kenzie Paige	1	98
18	Liviyah and Mackenzie Morgan †	1	77+
19	Donna Christanello and Kathy O'Day	1	21
20	Penny Mitchell and Velvet McIntyre	1	10¤
21	Princess Victoria and Sabrina	1	7
22	Sandy Parker and Susan Green	1	3
23	Renegade Twins (Charlette Renegade and Robyn Renegade)	1	1
24	Pretty Empowered 2.0 (Ella Envy and Roxy)	1	<1
25	Beverly Shade and Natasha the Hatchet Lady	1	<1–22¤
-	Adrienne Ames and Pat Lyda	1	N/A
-	Barbara Baker and June Byers	1	N/A
-	Betty Jo Hawkins and Penny Banner	2	N/A
-	Bonnie Watson and Penny Banner	1	N/A
-	Ella Waldek and Mae Young	1	N/A
-	June Byers and Ethel Johnson	1	N/A
-	June Byers and Mars Bennett	1	N/A
-	Kay Noble and Lolita Martinez	1	N/A
-	Lorraine Johnson and Millie Stafford	1	N/A
-	Lorraine Johnson and Penny Banner	2	N/A
-	The Fabulous Moolah and Patty Nelson	1	N/A
-	The Fabulous Moolah and Toni Rose	2	N/A

=== By wrestler ===
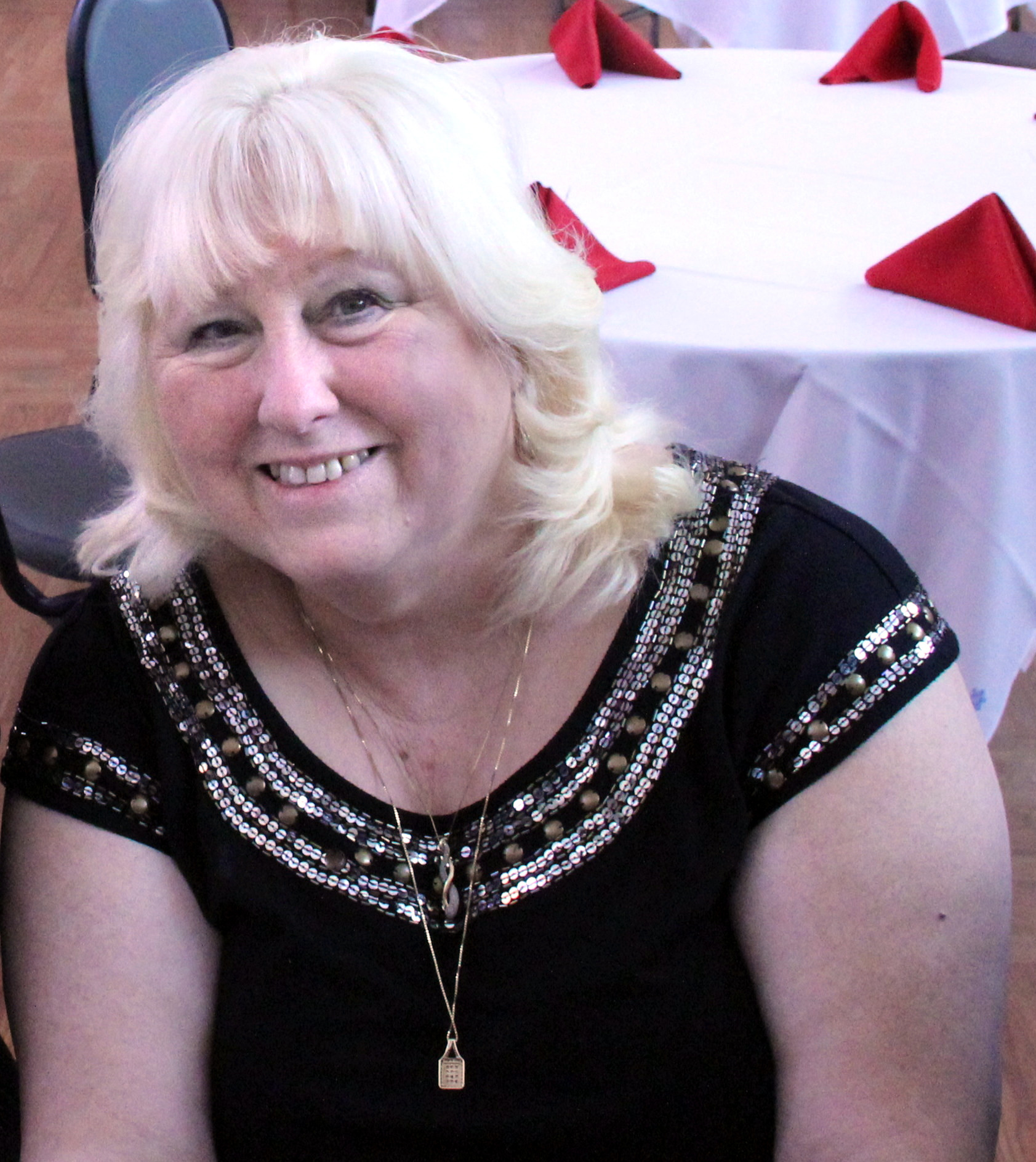
Record-setting 6-time and record-setting most combined days as NWA Women's Tag Team Champion at 2,095 days Joyce Grable

Rank	wrestler	No. of reigns	Combined days
1	Joyce Grable	6	2,095¤
2	Wendi Richter	3	1,418¤
3	Donna Christanello	4	1,263¤
4	Toni Rose	5	1,242–1,257¤
5	Vicki Williams	3	677¤
6	Ella Envy	4	489
7	Kenzie Paige	3	462
8	Allysin Kay	2	420
8	Marti Belle	2	420
10	June Byers	7	401–461¤
11	Mary Jane Mull	2	267–327¤
12	Tiffany Nieves	1	266
12	Valentina Rossi	1	266
14	Kylie Paige	2	258
15	Charity King	1	231
15	Danni Bee	1	231
17	Madi Wrenkowski	1	196
17	Missa Kate	1	196
19	Millie Stafford	3	134¤
20	Judy Martin	2	128¤
20	Leilani Kai	2	128¤
22	Daisy Mae	2	123–182¤
22	Golden Venus	2	123–182¤
24	Miss Starr	1	105
25	Carol Cook	1	75–104¤
25	Ruth Boatcallie	1	75–104¤
27	Big Mama	1	98
28	Liviyah †	1	77+
28	Mackenzie Morgan †	1	77+
30	Kathy O'Day	1	21
31	Penny Mitchell	1	10¤
31	Velvet McIntyre	1	10¤
33	Princess Victoria	1	7
33	Sabrina	1	7
35	Sandy Parker	1	3
35	Susan Green	1	3
37	Charlette Renegade	1	1
37	Robyn Renegade	1	1
39	Roxy	1	<1
40	Beverly Shade	1	<1–22¤
40	Natasha the Hatchet Lady	1	<1–22¤
-	Adrienne Ames	1	N/A
-	Barbara Baker	1	N/A
-	Ethel Johnson	1	N/A
-	Betty Jo Hawkins	2	N/A
-	Bonnie Watson	1	N/A
-	Ella Waldek	1	N/A
-	Kay Noble	1	N/A
-	Lolita Martinez	1	N/A
-	Lorraine Johnson	3	N/A
-	Mae Young	1	N/A
-	Mars Bennett	1	N/A
-	Pat Lyda	1	N/A
-	Patty Nelson	1	N/A
-	Penny Banner	5	N/A
-	The Fabulous Moolah	3	N/A

== Notes ==
- WWF Women's Tag Team Championship

== See also ==
- Women's World Tag Team Championship
- NWA World Women's Championship
- NWA World Women's Television Championship
