= NWA Back to the Territories =

2024 National Wrestling Alliance professional wrestling show

Back to the Territories
- Promotional poster featuring various NWA wrestlers
- Promotion: National Wrestling Alliance
- Date: June 1, 2024 (aired September 3, 2024, September 10, 2024, September 17, 2024, September 24, 2024)
- City: Knoxville, Tennessee
- Venue: Karns High School

Supercard chronology
← Previous; Crockett Cup	Next → 76th Anniversary Show

Back to the Territories was a professional wrestling event promoted by the National Wrestling Alliance (NWA). It took place on June 1, 2024, at Karns High School in Knoxville, Tennessee, airing on tape delay across four episodes of NWA Powerrr on The CW app.

In addition to wrestlers from the NWA, the event also featured talent from its official territories and affiliate promotions – NWA Exodus Pro Midwest, NWA Joe Cazana Promotions Southeast, NWA Kross Fire Wrestling, NWA Chicago, Fight The World Wrestling, and World League Wrestling. The event also saw the return of the NWA Mid-America Heavyweight Championship, which had been inactive since 1988.

== Production ==
=== Background ===
On October 9, 2023, NWA President William Patrick Corgan announced the relaunch of the NWA territory system, officially recognizing Cleveland promotion Exodus Pro Wrestling (now NWA Exodus Pro Midwest), run by NWA Worlds Heavyweight Champion EC3, as their first territory. Since then, the NWA began establishing territories including NWA Joe Cazana Promotions Southeast and NWA Kross Fire Wrestling in East Tennessee, and the creation of NWA Chicago in the Chicago metropolitan area. Additionally, the NWA began affiliating with promotions such as Fight The World Wrestling in Tampa Bay and World League Wrestling in Greater St. Louis.

On April 23, 2024, the NWA announced that Back to the Territories would take place on June 1, 2024, at Karns High School in Knoxville, Tennessee.

=== Storylines ===
The event will feature a number professional wrestling matches with different wrestlers involved in pre-existing scripted feuds, plots, and storylines. Wrestlers are portrayed as either heels (those that portray the "bad guys"), faces (the "good guy" characters), or tweeners (characters that are neither clearly a heel or a face) as they follow a series of tension-building events, which culminate in a wrestling match or series of matches as determined by the promotion. Storylines were played out on the eighteenth season of the NWA's weekly series, Powerrr.

== Results ==
YouTube exclusive (aired on September 2, 2024)
No.	Results	Stipulations	Times
1	Colby Corino won by last eliminating Slade (Note: Participants in order of elimination: Tyler Shoop, Wayne Moxxi, Michael Chandler, Jason Hendrix, Rahim de la Suede, Sam Beale, Andy Optimal, Alexander Lev, Dustin Bozworth, Moses the Deliverer, Dillon McQueen, Sebastian, Manbun Jesus, Sal Vation, Anthony Catena, Samuel C, VHS, Gaagz the Gymp, Bruiser Bob, Jackson Drake, "Magic" Jake Dumas, and Daisy Kill.)	Matt Cardona's Carnyland Gauntlet Battle Royal for an NWA Worlds Heavyweight Championship match later in the night	15:38

First episode (aired on September 3, 2024)
No.	Results	Stipulations	Times
1^{D}	Wayne Moxxi defeated Evan Golden by pinfall	Singles match	—
2	Natalia Markova defeated Max the Impaler (with Father James Mitchell) by countout	Singles match	5:39
3	EC3 (c) defeated Colby Corino by pinfall	Singles match for the NWA Worlds Heavyweight Championship	9:05
4	Knox and Murdoch (with Eric Smalls) defeated Blunt Force Trauma (Carnage and Damage) (c) (with Aron Stevens) by pinfall	Tag team match for the NWA World Tag Team Championship	8:03
(c) / – the champion(s) heading into the match; D / – this was a dark match

Second episode (aired on September 10, 2024)
No.	Results	Stipulations	Times
1	Jeremiah Plunkett defeated Dante Casanova, Hunter Drake, and Mario Pardua by pinfall	Four-way elimination match for the vacant NWA Mid-America Heavyweight Championship	6:16
2	Carson Drake defeated Bryan Idol by pinfall	Singles match	6:30
3	Thom Latimer (c) defeated Steve Boz by pinfall	Singles match for the NWA National Heavyweight Championship	4:06
4	Pretty Empowered (Kenzie Paige and Kylie Paige) defeated The It Girls (Ella Envy and Miss Starr) by pinfall	Street Fight	9:55
(c) / – the champion(s) heading into the match

=== NWA Mid-America Heavyweight Championship match ===
Eliminated	Wrestler	Eliminated by	Method of elimination	Time
1	Hunter Drake	Dante Casanova	Pinned after the Warrior's Death	3:06
2	Dante Casanova	Mario Pardua	Pinned after a uranage	4:58
3	Mario Pardua	Jeremiah Plunkett	Pinned after That Tennessee Move	6:16
Winner	Jeremiah Plunkett	—N/a		6:16

Third episode (aired on September 17, 2024)
No.	Results	Stipulations	Times
1	Pretty Boy Smooth (c) (with Pastor C-Lo) defeated Mims (with BLK Jeez) by countout	Singles match for the NWA Exodus Pro Midwest Championship	6:03
2	The King Bees (Charity King and Danni Bee) (c) defeated Caribbean Flow (La Rosa Negra and Ruthie Jay) by pinfall	Tag team match for the NWA World Women's Tag Team Championship	6:56
3	Juventud Guerrera (c) vs. Zyon (with Austin Idol) ended in a no contest	Singles match for the NWA Kross Fire Championship	6:38
4	The Stew Crew (Dylan Stewart and Zach Stewart) (c) defeated The Fixers, L.L.C. (Jay Bradley and Wrecking Ball Legursky) by pinfall	Tag team match for the NWA JCP Southeastern Tag Team Championship	6:01
(c) / – the champion(s) heading into the match

Fourth episode (aired on September 24, 2024)
No.	Results	Stipulations	Times
1	Joe Alonzo (c) defeated Damian Fenrir, Sodapop Hendrix, Camaro Jackson, Jaden Newman, Tyler Franks, Ashton Day, and Rafael Quintero by pinfall	Eight-way scramble for the NWA World Junior Heavyweight Championship	8:45
2	Baron Von Storm and Jax Dane defeated The Slimeballz (Sage Chantz and Tommy Rant) by submission	Tag team match to determine the #1 contender to the NWA United States Tag Team Championship	6:19
3	Tiffany Nieves, Reka Tehaka, and The Southern Six (Kerry Morton, Alex Taylor, and "Thrillbilly" Silas Mason) defeated Burchill, Taylor Rising, Big Mama, and The Country Gentlemen (AJ Cazana and KC Cazana) (with Joe Cazana) by pinfall	Ten-person mixed tag team match	9:18
(c) / – the champion(s) heading into the match
