= NWA 76th Anniversary Show =

2024 National Wrestling Alliance event

NWA 76
- Promotional poster featuring various NWA wrestlers
- Promotion: National Wrestling Alliance
- Date: August 31, 2024 (aired October 1, 2024, October 8, 2024, October 15, 2024, October 22, 2024, October 29, 2024)
- City: Philadelphia, Pennsylvania
- Venue: 2300 Arena

Supercard chronology
← Previous; Back to the Territories	Next → Samhain 2

NWA Anniversary Show chronology
← Previous; 75th	Next → 77th

The NWA 76th Anniversary Show (also simply called NWA 76) was a professional wrestling event produced by the National Wrestling Alliance (NWA). It was the 14th event under the NWA Anniversary Show chronology. It took place on August 31, 2024, at the 2300 Arena in Philadelphia, Pennsylvania, airing on tape delay across five episodes of NWA Powerrr on X.

Fifteen matches were contested at the event. In the main event, Thom Latimer defeated EC3 to win the NWA Worlds Heavyweight Championship.

== Production ==
=== Background ===
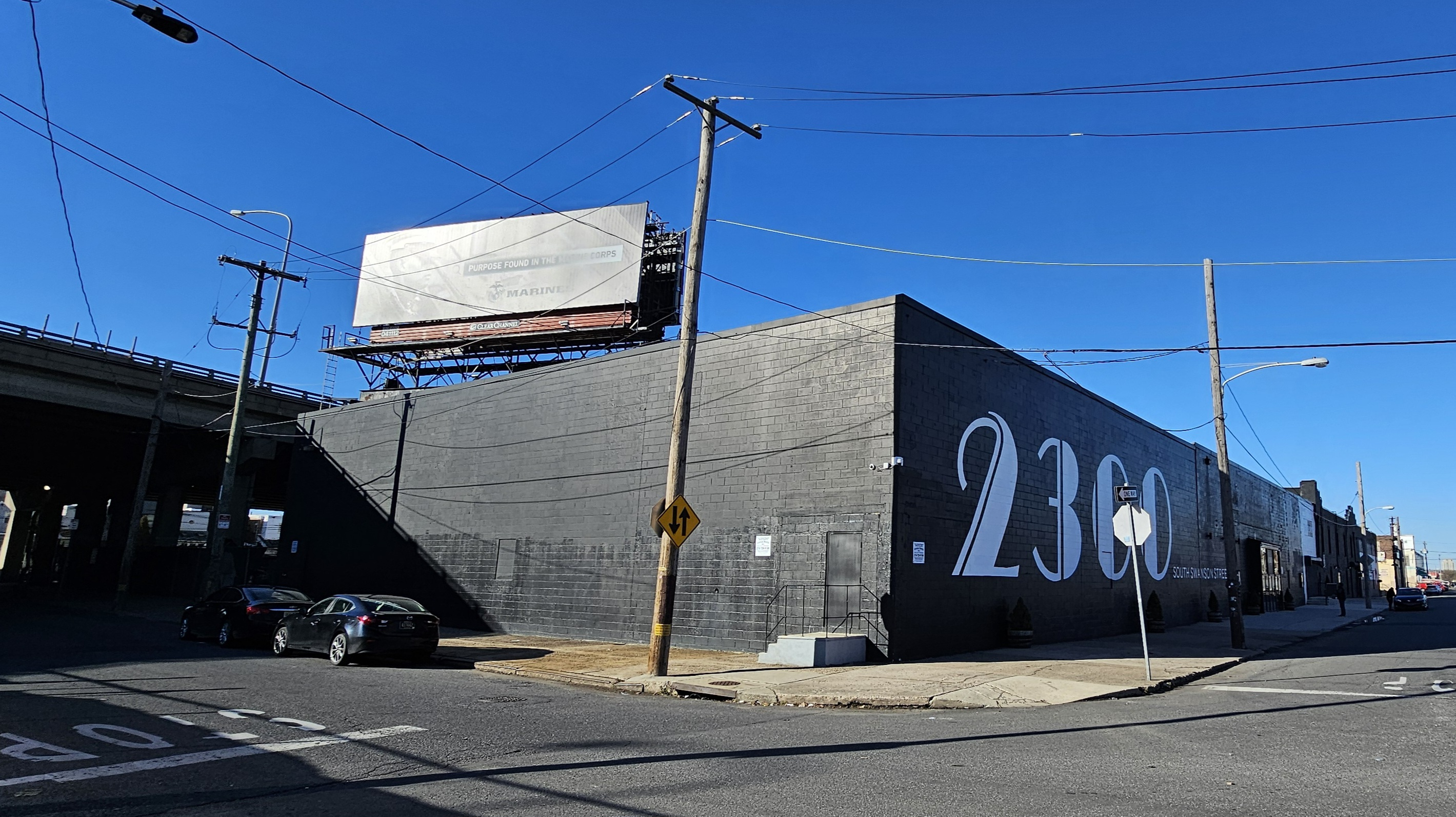
The event will be held at the 2300 Arena in Philadelphia, Pennsylvania.

The NWA Anniversary Show is a professional wrestling event held by the National Wrestling Alliance (NWA). The first event was held in 1998 to celebrate the 50th anniversary of the 1948 founding of the NWA. The event then continued to be held annually until 2005. It has since been held periodically, with shows held in 2008, 2018, 2021, 2022, and 2023.

On April 2, 2024, it was announced that the NWA 76th Anniversary Show would take place on August 31, 2024, at the 2300 Arena in Philadelphia, Pennsylvania. This would be the first NWA's event in Philadelphia under Billy Corgan’s ownership, as well as NWA's first flagship event in Philadelphia since the third annual Eddie Gilbert Memorial Brawl, held in February 1998.

=== Storylines ===
The event featured professional wrestling matches that involve different wrestlers from pre-existing scripted feuds and storylines. Wrestlers portray heroes, villains, or less distinguishable characters in scripted events that built tension and culminate in a wrestling match or series of matches. Storylines are produced during the nineteenth season of the NWA's weekly series, Powerrr.

On the April 23 Hard Times edition of NWA Powerr, Mike Knox and Trevor Murdoch defeated The Southern Six (Alex Taylor and Kerry Morton) in a tag team steel cage match. Both teams would later compete in the Crockett Cup, where the Southern Six defeated Knox and Murdoch – the previous winners – in the semifinals, before defeating The Immortals (Kratos and Odinson) to win the tournament. On July 25, the NWA announced that The Southern Six would face Knox and Murdoch in a grudge match at NWA 76.

On July 29, the NWA announced the return of the Burke Invitational Gauntlet, a multi-woman gauntlet match where the winner would receive a future NWA World Women's Championship match.

Ten participants would be announced for the match, including:

- "HollyHood" Haley J
- Kayla Rossi
- Tiffany Nieves
- Mystii Marks
- Kylie Paige
- Adrianna Mosley
- Natalia Markova
- Lili Ruiz
- La Rosa Negra
- Alejandra Quintanilla
- Santana Garrett

On the July 30 episode of NWA Powerrr, Daisy Kill and Talos won the vacant NWA United States Tag Team Championship after defeating The Fixers (Jay Bradley and Wrecking Ball Legursky). Two days later, the NWA announced that Kill and Talos would defend the titles in a four-way tag team match against The Fixers, The Country Gentlemen (AJ Cazana and KC Cazana), and The Slimeballz (Sage Chantz and Tommy Rant).

On the April 16 Hard Times edition of NWA Powerrr, The Immortals (Kratos and Odinson) challenged Blunt Force Trauma (BFT) (Carnage and Damage) for the NWA World Tag Team Championship. However, before they could, BFT's manager Aron Stevens demanded The Immortals relinquish the NWA United States Tag Team Championship. They would do so at the event, but unfortunately, interference by Stevens led to BFT retaining the titles. On August 8, the NWA announced that The Immortals would have a rematch with BFT in a Liberty Bell Brawl.

== Results ==
Dark matches
No.	Results	Stipulations
1	Sodapop Hendrix defeated Papadon by pinfall	Singles match
2	Shawn Carlson defeated The Rockstar by pinfall	Singles match
3	Mario Pardua and Steve Boz defeated Foxx Vinyer and Tim Theory by pinfall	Tag team match

First episode (aired on October 1, 2024)
No.	Results	Stipulations	Times
1	Knox and Murdoch (c) defeated The Southern 6 (Alex Taylor and Kerry Morton) by pinfall	Tag team match for the NWA World Tag Team Championship	7:51
2	Thom Latimer defeated EC3 (c) by pinfall	Singles match for the NWA Worlds Heavyweight Championship	16:00
(c) / – the champion(s) heading into the match

Second episode (aired on October 8, 2024)
No.	Results	Stipulations	Times
1	The Immortals (Kratos and Odinson) defeated Blunt Force Trauma (Carnage and Damage) (with Aron Stevens)	Liberty Bell Brawl	10:36
2	Mims (with BLK Jeez) defeated Bryan Idol, Burchill, and Carson Drake by pinfall	Four-way elimination match for the vacant NWA National Heavyweight Championship	8:07
3	Kenzie Paige (c) defeated Max the Impaler (with Father James Mitchell) by pinfall	Singles match for the NWA World Women's Championship	8:02
(c) / – the champion(s) heading into the match

=== NWA National Heavyweight Championship match ===
Eliminated	Wrestler	Eliminated by	Method of elimination	Time
1	Bryan Idol	Burchill	Pinned after a double underhook DDT	3:07
2	Burchill	Mims	Pinned after a heart punch	6:32
3	Carson Drake	Mims	Pinned with a lateral press	8:07
Winner	Mims	—N/a		8:07

Third episode (aired on October 15, 2024)
No.	Results	Stipulations	Times
1	Jack Cartwheel defeated Alex Misery by pinfall	Singles match to determine the #1 contender to the NWA World Junior Heavyweight Championship	11:10
2	Natalia Markova won by last eliminating Tiffany Nieves	Burke Invitational Gauntlet for an NWA World Women's Championship match	21:09

=== Burke Invitational gauntlet match entrances and eliminations ===
Draw	Entrant	Order	Eliminated by	Method of elimination	Elimination(s)
1	Ruthie Jay	1	Big Mama	Pinfall	0
2	Kylie Paige	11	Natalia Markova	Over the top rope	3
3	Lili Ruiz	3	Natalia Markova	Over the top rope	1
4	Big Mama	2	Kylie Paige, Lili Ruiz, and "HollyHood" Haley J	Over the top rope	1
5	"HollyHood" Haley J	7	Tiffany Nieves	Submission	1
6	La Rosa Negra	9	Santana Garrett	Over the top rope	0
7	Natalia Markova	–	Winner	–	3
8	Tiffany Nieves	12	Natalia Markova	Pinfall	1
9	Mystii Marks	5	Kayla Rossi	Over the top rope	0
10	Kayla Rossi	6	Kylie Paige	Pinfall	2
11	Adrianna Mosley	8	Santana Garrett	Over the top rope	0
12	Kelly Maden	4	Kayla Rossi	Over the top rope	0
13	Santana Garrett	10	Kylie Paige	Over the top rope	2

Fourth episode (aired on October 22, 2024)
No.	Results	Stipulations	Times
1	The Country Gentlemen (AJ Cazana and KC Cazana) (with Joe Cazana) defeated Daisy Kill and Talos (c) (with Vampiro), The Fixers, L.L.C. (Jay Bradley and Wrecking Ball Legursky), and The Slimeballz (Sage Chantz and Tommy Rant) by pinfall	Four-way tag team match for the NWA United States Tag Team Championship	11:12
2	The It Girls (Ella Envy and Miss Starr) defeated The King Bees (Charity King and Danni Bee) (c) by pinfall	Tag team match for the NWA World Women's Tag Team Championship	7:47
(c) / – the champion(s) heading into the match

Fifth episode (aired on October 29, 2024)
No.	Results	Stipulations	Times
1	Gaagz the Gymp defeated Alexander Lev by pinfall	Singles match	5:39
2	Zyon and "Magic" Jake Dumas (with Austin Idol) defeated Baron Von Storm and Jax Dane by pinfall	Tag team match	8:31
3	"Thrillbilly" Silas Mason defeated Colby Corino by pinfall	Singles match	9:13

== See also ==
- 2024 in professional wrestling
