= NWA Hard Times (2024) =

2024 National Wrestling Alliance pay-per-view event

Hard Times (2024)
- Promotional poster featuring various NWA wrestlers
- Promotion: National Wrestling Alliance
- Date: March 2, 2024 (aired April 9, 2024, April 16, 2024, April 23, 2024, April 30, 2024, May 7, 2024)
- City: Dothan, Alabama
- Venue: Dothan Civic Center
- Attendance: 1,535

Supercard chronology
← Previous; Paranoia	Next → Crockett Cup

Hard Times chronology
← Previous; 3	Next → V

The 2024 Hard Times (also known as Hard Times 4) was the fourth Hard Times professional wrestling event promoted by the National Wrestling Alliance (NWA). It took place on March 2, 2024, at the Dothan Civic Center in Dothan, Alabama. The event was initially announced as a pay-per-view, but was instead used as a TV taping for NWA's flagship show NWA Powerrr, mapped into five episodes that aired on The CW app.

Sixteen matches were contested at the event. In the main event, EC3 defeated "Thrillbilly" Silas Mason to retain the NWA Worlds Heavyweight Championship.

== Production ==
=== Background ===
NWA Hard Times is an annual professional wrestling pay-per-view event produced by the National Wrestling Alliance. The inaugural Hard Times event took part on January 24, 2020, and the second event took place on December 4, 2021, making it a recurring annual pay-per-view event.

On October 28, at Samhain, NWA announced that their next PPV would be Hard Times, and on January 4, 2024, they announced that the event would be held on March 2, 2024, at the Dothan Civic Center in Dothan, Alabama. After NWA programming moved to The CW's app, the event would instead air as episodes of Powerrr.

=== Storylines ===
The event featured professional wrestling matches that involved different wrestlers from pre-existing scripted feuds and storylines. Wrestlers portray heroes, villains, or less distinguishable characters in scripted events that built tension and culminate in a wrestling match or series of matches. Storylines were produced during the seventeenth season of the NWA's weekly series, Powerrr.

== Results ==
First episode (aired on April 9, 2024)
No.	Results	Stipulations	Times
1	Joe Alonzo defeated Colby Corino (c) by pinfall	Singles match for the NWA World Junior Heavyweight Championship	8:20
2	Ruthie Jay and La Rosa Negra defeated Reka Tehaka and Tiffany Nieves by pinfall	Tag team match	6:06
3	Spencer Slade (with Rolando Freeman) defeated "Magic" Jake Dumas by pinfall	Singles match	5:40
4	The King Bees (Danni Bee and Charity King) (c) defeated Pretty Empowered (Ella Envy and Kylie Paige) 2-1	Pretty Rules match for the NWA World Women's Tag Team Championship	7:58
(c) / – the champion(s) heading into the match

=== Pretty Rules match ===
Score	Winner	Decision	Time
1–0	Danni Bee	Pinned Ella Envy	0:18
1–1	Kylie Paige	Pinned Danni Bee	4:07
2–1	Charity King	Pinned Ella Envy	7:58

Second episode (aired on April 16, 2024)
No.	Results	Stipulations	Times
1	The Fixers, L.L.C.(Jay Bradley and Wrecking Ball Legursky) defeated Tim Storm and J.A.C. by pinfall	NWA United States Tag Team Championship tournament first round match	6:57
2	Taylor Rising defeated Miss Star by pinfall	Singles match	4:48
3	Blunt Force Trauma (Damage and Carnage) (c) (with Aron Stevens) defeated The Immortals (J. R. Kratos and Odinson) by pinfall	Tag team match for the NWA World Tag Team Championship	7:47
(c) / – the champion(s) heading into the match

Third episode (aired on April 23, 2024)
No.	Results	Stipulations	Times
1	Daisy Kill and Talos defeated Mecha Wolf and Alex Misery by pinfall	NWA United States Tag Team Championship tournament first round match	6:51
2	Kenzie Paige (c) defeated Natalia Markova by pinfall	Singles match for the NWA World Women's Championship	8:05
3	The Miserably Faithful (Max the Impaler, Judais, and Gaagz the Gymp) (with Father James Mitchell) defeated Magnum Muscle (Mims and Dak Draper) and Carson Drake by pinfall	Six-person tag team match	7:07
(c) / – the champion(s) heading into the match

Fourth episode (aired on April 30, 2024)
No.	Results	Stipulations	Times
1	The Kidz (Alexander Lev and Jackson Drake) defeated The Slimeballz (Sage Chantz and Tommy Rant) by pinfall	Tag team match	7:21
2	AJ Cazana (with KC Cazana and Joe Cazana) defeated Anthony Andrews (with Austin Idol and Zyon) by pinfall	Last Call match The winner picked which opposing member was fired from the NWA; Andrews was picked and thus was fired.	4:23
3	Knox and Murdoch defeated The Southern Six (Alex Taylor and Kerry Morton) (with Ricky Morton) by escaping the cage	Steel Cage match	10:29

Fifth episode (aired on April 30, 2024)
No.	Results	Stipulations	Times
1	A. J. Francis defeated Bryan Idol by pinfall	No Disqualification match	7:05
2	Thom Latimer defeated Blake "Bulletproof" Troop, Paul Burchill and Zyon (with Austin Idol) by pinfall	Four-way match for the vacant NWA National Heavyweight Championship	5:20
3	EC3 (c) defeated "Thrillbilly" Silas Mason by pinfall	Singles match for the NWA Worlds Heavyweight Championship	12:49
(c) / – the champion(s) heading into the match

=== NWA National Championship Tournament brackets ===
First Round; NWA Powerrr (January 14) (aired March 19 and 26, April 2)
1	Thom Latimer	Pin
8	Carson Drake	4:33
3	Blake "Bulletproof" Troop	TKO
6	Bryan Idol	5:54
4	AJ Cazana	7:24
5	Zyon	Pin
2	Burchill	Pin
7	"Magic" Jake Dumas	5:34

Final; Hard Times 4 (March 2) (airing TBC)
1	Thom Latimer	Pin
3	Blake "Bulletproof" Troop	7:05
5	Zyon	–
2	Burchill	–
