= NWA Paranoia =

2024 National Wrestling Alliance pay-per-view event

NWA Paranoia (2024)
- Promotional poster featuring various NWA wrestlers
- Promotion: National Wrestling Alliance
- Date: January 13, 2024 (aired February 6, 2024, February 13, 2024, February 20, 2024, February 27, 2024)
- City: Fort Lauderdale, Florida
- Venue: Revolution Live
- Attendance: 1,300
- Tagline: Who Can You Trust?

Supercard chronology
← Previous; First	Next → Hard Times

Paranoia was a professional wrestling event promoted by the National Wrestling Alliance (NWA) and was the first event promoted as a Signature Live Event. It took place on January 13, 2024, at Revolution Live in Fort Lauderdale, Florida, but aired on tape delay across four episodes of NWA Powerrr that aired on The CW app.

== Production ==
=== Background ===
As part of the NWA's move to The CW app, NWA Signature Live Events act as tapings for NWA Powerrr, with matches taped for future episodes.

On November 29, 2023, the NWA announced that Paranoia, its first Signature Live Event, would take place on January 13, 2024, at Revolution Live in Fort Lauderdale, Florida.

=== Storylines ===
The event featured professional wrestling matches that involved different wrestlers from pre-existing scripted feuds and storylines. Wrestlers portray heroes, villains, or less distinguishable characters in scripted events that built tension and culminate in a wrestling match or series of matches. Storylines were produced during the sixteenth season of the NWA's weekly series, Powerrr.

== Results ==
Dark matches
No.	Results	Stipulations
1	Rolando Freeman defeated Eric Smalls and Gustavo Aguilar by pinfall	Three-way match
2	The Kidz (Alexander Lev and Jackson Drake) defeated The Miserably Faithful (Sal the Pal and Gaagz the Gymp) by pinfall	Tag team match

First episode (aired on February 6, 2024)
No.	Results	Stipulations	Times
1	Blunt Force Trauma (Carnage and Damage) (c) (with Aron Stevens) defeated Tim Storm and Jax Dane by pinfall	Tag team match for the NWA World Tag Team Championship	4:00
2	Kenzie Paige (c) defeated Tiffany Nieves by pinfall	Singles match for the NWA World Women's Championship	8:32
3	EC3 (c) defeated Matt Cardona by submission	"The Ultimate Match of Death" for the NWA Worlds Heavyweight Championship	16:47
(c) / – the champion(s) heading into the match

Second episode (aired on February 13, 2024)
No.	Results	Stipulations	Times
1	Knox and Murdoch vs. The Southern Six (Kerry Morton and Alex Taylor) (with Ricky Morton) ended in a no contest	Tag team match	6:51
2	Max the Impaler (Women's) (with Father James Mitchell) defeated Mims (Men's) by pinfall	Unification match for the NWA World Television Championship and the NWA World Women's Television Championship; No time limit, there must be a winner	7:29
3	The Immortals (Kratos and Odinson) (c) defeated The Slimeballz (Sage Chantz and Tommy Rant) by pinfall	Tag team match for the NWA United States Tag Team Championship	5:04
4	"Thrillbilly" Silas Mason (c) defeated Burchill by pinfall	Singles match for the NWA National Heavyweight Championship	7:22
(c) / – the champion(s) heading into the match

Third episode (aired on February 20, 2024)
No.	Results	Stipulations	Times
1	Taylor Rising, Ruthie Jay, and Natalia Markova defeated Miss Starr, CJ, and Missa Kate by pinfall	Six-woman tag team match Whoever earns the winning fall earns an NWA World Women's Championship match. Markova pinned Kate to win.	6:48
2	Colby Corino (c) defeated Mecha Wolf by pinfall	Singles match for the NWA World Junior Heavyweight Championship; Homicide was the special guest referee	9:20
3	Daisy Kill and Talos defeated The New Spectaculars 2.0 (Rush Freeman and Slade) (with Rolando Freeman) by pinfall	Tag team match	5:19
4	Thom Latimer defeated Bryan Idol by pinfall	Falls Count Anywhere match	8:40
(c) / – the champion(s) heading into the match

Fourth episode (aired on February 27, 2024)
No.	Results	Stipulations	Times
1	Blake "Bulletproof" Troop (with Chris Silvio, Esq.) defeated Joe Alonzo by referee stoppage	Singles match	5:25
2	"Magic" Jake Dumas defeated Alex Misery by pinfall	Singles match	6:44
3	Zyon and Anthony Andrews (with Austin Idol) defeated The Country Gentlemen (AJ Cazana and JC Cazana) (with Joe Cazana) by pinfall	Tag team match	5:31
4	The King Bees (Charity King and Danni Bee) defeated Pretty Empowered (Ella Envy and Kylie Paige) (c) by pinfall	Tag team match for the NWA World Women's Tag Team Championship	8:37
(c) / – the champion(s) heading into the match
