= NWA Samhain =

2023 National Wrestling Alliance event

- Promotional poster
- Promotion: National Wrestling Alliance
- Date: October 28, 2023
- City: Cleveland, Ohio
- Venue: Cleveland Masonic Temple

Pay-per-view chronology
← Previous; 75th Anniversary Show	Next → —

Samhain chronology
← Previous; First	Next → 2

NWA Samhain (Note: /sɑːwɪn/ SAH-win, /ˈsaʊɪn/ SOW-in) was a professional wrestling pay-per-view event produced by the National Wrestling Alliance (NWA). It was held on October 28, 2023, at Cleveland Masonic Temple in Cleveland, Ohio.

Fifteen matches were contested at the event, including four on the pre-show. In the main event, EC3 defeated Thom Latimer in a No Limits match to retain the NWA Worlds Heavyweight Championship.

== Production ==
=== Background ===
Other on-screen personnel
Role:	Name:
Commentators	Joe Galli
Commentators	Tim Storm
Commentators	Danny Dealz
Ring announcer	Kyle Davis
Interviewer	May Valentine

On the September 5, 2023 episode of Powerrr, NWA announced that NWA Samhain would take place on October 28, 2023, at TempleLive at Cleveland Masonic in Cleveland, Ohio.

=== Storylines ===
The event featured professional wrestling matches that involve different wrestlers from pre-existing scripted feuds and storylines. Wrestlers portrayed heroes, villains, or less distinguishable characters in scripted events that built tension and culminate in a wrestling match or series of matches. Storylines were produced during the fifteenth season of the NWA's weekly series, Powerrr.

On the September 5 episode of Powerrr, NWA Worlds Heavyweight Champion EC3 issued a challenge to NWA World Television Champion Thom Latimer to invoke his "Lucky Seven Rule" and face him for the world title. The following week, Latimer and his wife Kamille confronted EC3, with the former officially relinquishing the television title for his world title opportunity at Samhain. On the October 4, 2023 episode of Powerrr, Kamille confirmed that she would be in Latimer's corner for this match. On the October 17 episode of Powerrr, EC3 would bring up his and Latimer's previous history with each other, including at the previous year's anniversary show, where he and his Control Your Narrative henchmen held Latimer down and EC3 nearly hit him in the head with a chair. While also making reference to Kamille's No Limits match at NWA 75, EC3 challenged Latimer to the same match for the title at Samhain.

On the September 19 episode of Powerrr, Ruthie Jay defeated Missa Kate and Natalia Markova to become the number one contender for the NWA World Women's Championship, challenging Kenzie Paige for the title at NWA Samhain.

On the October 3 Powerrr, Natalia Markova and Taylor Rising defeated M95 (Madi and Missa Kate) to become number one contenders to the NWA World Women's Tag Team Championship and will challenge champions Pretty Empowered (Ella Envy and Kylie Paige) at Samhain.

On Night 2 of NWA 75, Blunt Force Trauma (Carnage and Damage) retained the NWA World Tag Team Championship against Mike Knox and Trevor Murdoch after BFT's manage Aron Stevens punched Murdoch in the face with a loaded glove, allowing Damage to pin him and retain the titles. The two teams would have a rematch a month later on the September 26 episode of Powerrr. There, Damage hit Murdoch with a chair, provided by Stevens who distracted the official. Knox would wrangle the chair away from Damage and attempt to use it himself, but when the official turned around and saw the chair in Knox's hands, he called for a disqualification, allowing BFT to retain again. A week later, Stevens was being interviewed at the ringside podium when he was confronted by Knox and Murdoch, who wanted one more opportunity at BFT and the tag team titles. Stevens granted them that opportunity at NWA Samhain, where they would challenge BFT for the titles in a "Knights of the Round Table" tables match (a standard tables match with the objective being to put your opponent through a round table rather than a long, rectangular table.)

On Night 1 of NWA 75, Jax Dane and Tim Storm faced off in "A Matter of Respect" No Disqualification match. Some minutes into the match, Storm was suplexed by Dane and stayed down, appearing to be injured. Dane would be awarded the win via referee stoppage. On the following night's pre-show, Dane and his SVGS partner Blake "Bulletproof" Troop competed in a battle royal to earn an NWA National Heavyweight Championship match, only for the latter to betray the former and eliminate him from the match. Over a month later on the October 3 episode of Powerrr, Dane faced his former manager Chris Silvio in the latter's first NWA match. During the match, Silvio took a microphone and lambasted Dane for holding back on Storm during their match, going as far as to call him "weak." Dane would make quick work of Silvio, making Silvio tap out to Trap City. The following week, the former SVGS held an in-ring summit where Dane and Troop, a trained mixed martial artist, agreed to face off in a submission match at Samhain.

During the National Championship number one contender's battle royal on Night 2 of NWA 75, Brady Pierce eliminated his Spectaculars partner Rush Freeman without second thought, before throwing Rush's older brother Rolando Freeman on top of Rush. On the subsequent episode of Powerrr, Pierce defeated Rolando in quick fashion. However, three weeks later, Pierce was interviewed backstage and urged Rolando to leave Rush and join the "winning side." On the October 10 Powerrr, after Rush and Rolando lost their match, Rolando was interviewed backstage declaring that a match between Rush and Pierce will happen in the future, with himself as special guest referee. The NWA later booked the match for Samhain, with the stipulation that the loser is forced to leave the NWA.

On the September 12 Powerr, NWA World Junior Heavyweight Champion Colby Corino and Joe Alonzo were on opposite sides of a tag team match. The two were clients of Jamie Stanley, but during the match, Stanley continuously interfered on behalf of Alonzo, leading to his team getting the win. As a result, Corino would defend his title against Alonzo in a "Pillar to Post match" at Samhain.

On the NWA 75 Night 2 pre-show, Daisy Kill and Talos defeated The Country Gentlemen (AJ Cazana and Anthony Andrews) to win the NWA United States Tag Team Championship. Soon after their win, The Immortals (J. R. Kratos and Odinson) came out to confront the new champions, hinting at a future match. On the October 10 Powerrr, after Kil and Talos successfully retained against AJ and KC Cazana, The Immortals immediately challenged them to an impromptu title match. The latter team won by countout, meaning that the former retained their titles. On October 17, the NWA announced a rematch between the two for the Samhain pre-show.

At NWA 75, Violent J of the Insane Clown Posse accompanied The Brothers of Funstruction (Yabo and Ruffo) for their matches, mostly as a means of sticking it to Vampiro, his former running mate in The Dark Carnival and current manager of La Rebelión (Bestia 666 and Mecha Wolf). With the two units going back and forth with each other, the NWA booked a six-man tag team match between them at Samhain. On the October 17 episode of Powerrr, Yabo defeated Mecha Wolf in a "Pick Your Poison" match, allowing his team to pick the stipulation for their match. The following week, Violent J announced the stipulation to be a "Riddle Box match," where various weapons and objects are hidden in crates around the arena which both teams can break open and use the contents inside.

For months, despite actively competing on their own, Sal the Pal and Gaagz the Gymp have been trying to escape the control of Father James Mitchell. On the October 17 Powerrr, Mitchell, the host of Samhain, announced an Ultimate Hardcore Tag Team War, where Sal, Gaagz, and a partner(s) of their choosing would face NWA World Women's Television Champion Max the Impaler, Judais, and their own team. If Sal and Gaagz win, they will be free from Mitchell, but if they lose, they will forever be under his control. Sal and Gaagz's team was revealed to consist of Koa Laxamana and Magnum Muscle (Dak Draper and the NWA World Television Champion Mims), while Judais and Max will team with Alex Misery and Magic Inc. (Cody James and "Magic" Jake Dumas).

On the October 17 Powerrr, Chris Adonis defeated Zyon by disqualification to earn an opportunity at "Thrillbilly" Silas Mason's NWA National Heavyweight Championship at Samhain in a Burning Lake Brawl.

== Cocaine segment incident ==
In the weeks prior to the event, it was reported by news blog Haus of Wrestling that the promotion was in-talks with The CW to air Powerrr and a new reality series about the NWA on the network. However, a segment in which Father James Mitchell, along with several women and wrestlers were seen consuming cocaine reportedly drew negative reactions on social media from viewers of The CW, and was also poorly-received by CW executives.

In November, The CW signed a deal with WWE to air its NXT program beginning in October 2024, under a five-year deal. However, though it was rumored to be in-response to the Samhain segment, Corgan later revealed in a 2024 interview with Fightful that the CW executives did not have a problem with the spot and the reports were "a completely invented story by either a troll inside the company, a leaker or something.”

The scene was voted as the co-winner of WrestleCrap's Gooker Award for the worst gimmick, storyline, or event in wrestling in 2023, tied with CM Punk's tenure in All Elite Wrestling.

== Results ==
No.	Results	Stipulations	Times
1^{P}	Brandon Day (with Towel Boy Tommy) defeated Manbun Jesus (with The Grizzly Groovies) by pinfall	NWA Exodus Pro Heavyweight Championship Tournament Qualifying match	4:27
2^{P}	Jordan Clearwater and The Country Gentlemen (AJ Cazana and KC Cazana) (with Joe Cazana) defeated The Outrunners (Truth Magnum and Turbo Floyd) and Zyon (with Austin Idol) by pinfall	Six-man tag team match	6:56
3^{P}	Samantha Starr defeated Missa Kate, Chelsea, and Tiffany Nieves by pinfall	Four-way match to determine #1 contender to the NWA World Women's Championship	3:34
4^{P}	The Immortals (Odinson and JR Kratos) defeated Daisy Kill and Talos (c) by pinfall	Tag team match for the NWA United States Tag Team Championship	8:56
5	Magic Inc. (Cody James and "Magic" Jake Dumas), Alex Misery, Judais, and Max the Impaler (with CJ and Father James Mitchell) defeated Gaagz the Gymp, Sal the Pal, Koa Laxamana, and Magnum Muscle (Dak Draper and Mims) (with Kallies Malia) by pinfall	Devil's Last Dance Ultimate Hardcore War; Since Sal and Gaagz's team lost, Sal and Gaagz will be forever indentured to Mitchell.	14:14
6	Rush Freeman defeated Brady Pierce by pinfall	Loser Leaves NWA match Rolando Freeman was the special guest referee.	5:59
7	Colby Corino (c) defeated Joe Alonzo by pinfall	"Pillar to Post" match for the NWA World Junior Heavyweight Championship	9:31
8	The Southern 6 (Kerry Morton and Alex Taylor) (with Ricky Morton) defeated The Headbangers (Mosh and Thrasher) by pinfall	"Rock 'n' Roll" tag team match If your partner kicks out, you take a shot.	7:49
9	Jax Dane defeated Blake "Bulletproof" Troop (with Chris Silvio, Esq.) by submission	Submission match	7:03
10	Pretty Empowered (Ella Envy and Kylie Paige) (c) defeated Taylor Rising and Natalia Markova by pinfall	Tag team match for the NWA World Women's Tag Team Championship	7:57
11	"Thrillbilly" Silas Mason (c) (with Ricky Morton) defeated Chris Adonis by pinfall	Burning Lake Brawl for the NWA National Heavyweight Championship	6:57
12	The Brothers of Funstruction (Yabo and Ruffo) and Violent J defeated Vampiro and La Rebelión (Bestia 666 and Mecha Wolf) (with Jerry Other) by pinfall	"Riddle Box" six-man tag team match	12:00
13	Kenzie Paige (c) defeated Ruthie Jay by pinfall	Singles match for the NWA World Women's Championship	7:27
14	Blunt Force Trauma (Carnage and Damage) (c) defeated Knox and Murdoch	"Knights of the Round Table" Tables match for the NWA World Tag Team Championship; Aron Stevens was banned from ringside.	14:35
15	EC3 (c) defeated Thom Latimer (with Kamille) by pinfall	No Limits match for the NWA Worlds Heavyweight Championship	15:16
(c) / – the champion(s) heading into the match; P / – the match was broadcast on the pre-show

=== Devil's Last Dance Ultimate Hardcore Team War match ===
Eliminated	Wrestler	Eliminated by	Method	Team
1	Alex Misery	Dak Draper	Eliminated after being thrown over the top rope	Team Judais, Max, Misery, and Magic Inc.
2	Dak Draper	Cody James	Pinned after being hit with a cane.	Team Sal, Gaagz, Laxamana, and Magnum Muscle
3	Cody James	Himself	Eliminated after performing a suicide dive over the top rope on Laxamana.	Team Judais, Max, Misery, and Magic Inc.
4	Koa Laxamana	"Magic" Jake Dumas	Pinned after a DDT	Team Sal, Gaagz, Laxamana, and Magnum Muscle
5	"Magic" Jake Dumas	Mims	Pinned after the Big Strong Slam	Team Judais, Max, Misery, and Magic Inc.
6	Judais	Mims	Pinned with a roll-up	Team Judais, Max, Misery, and Magic Inc.
7	Mims	Max the Impaler	Eliminated after being thrown over the top rope	Team Sal, Gaagz, Laxamana, and Magnum Muscle
8	Gaagz the Gymp	Max the Impaler	Pinned after a clothesline.	Team Sal, Gaagz, Laxamana, and Magnum Muscle
9	Sal the Pal	Max the Impaler	Pinned after Welcome to The Wasteland	Team Sal, Gaagz, Laxamana, and Magnum Muscle
Winner	Max the Impaler	N/A		Team Judais, Max, Misery, and Magic Inc.

== See also ==
- 2023 in professional wrestling
