= Crockett Cup (2024) =

2024 National Wrestling Alliance professional wrestling show

- Promotional poster featuring various NWA wrestlers
- Promotion: National Wrestling Alliance
- Date: May 18, 2024 (aired June 18, 2024, June 25, 2024, July 2, 2024, July 9, 2024, July 16, 2024)
- City: Forney, Texas
- Venue: OC Theatre

Supercard chronology
← Previous; Hard Times	Next → Back to the Territories

Crockett Cup chronology
← Previous; 2023	Next → 2025

The 2024 iteration of the Crockett Cup was a professional wrestling tag team tournament produced by the National Wrestling Alliance (NWA). The event took place on May 18, 2024, at the OC Theatre in Forney, Texas, but aired on tape delay for NWA Powerrr, spread across five episodes that aired on The CW app. It was the seventh iteration of the Crockett Cup.

Eighteen matches were contested at the event, including three dark matches. In the main event, The Southern 6 (Kerry Morton and Alex Taylor) defeated The Immortals (Kratos and Odinson) to win the Crockett Cup.

== Production ==
=== Background ===
The Crockett Cup is a tag team tournament first held in April 1986. National Wrestling Alliance (NWA) member Jim Crockett Promotions (JCP), headed by Jim Crockett Jr., hosted the Crockett Cup, held in honor of Crockett's father, JCP founder Jim Crockett Sr. and saw participation of teams from various NWA territories. JCP held the tournament again in 1987 and 1988, before JCP was sold to Ted Turner later that year. In July 2017, the Crockett Foundation, with Classic Pro Wrestling, held the "Crockett Foundation Cup Tag Team Tournament" in New Kent, Virginia, which was not affiliated with the NWA. Bobby Fulton, The Barbarian, and The Rock 'n' Roll Express, all former Crockett Cup participants, took part in the event as a link to the original tournaments.

The original concept of the Crockett Cup was a single elimination tag team tournament, with the storyline prize of $1,000,000.00 given to the winning team along with a large trophy. The 1986 and 1987 tournaments featured 24 teams, while the 1988 version had 22 teams competing. Each tournament was split over two shows to encompass all 23 tournament matches as well as non-tournament matches; in 1986, JCP held a show in the afternoon and another in the evening, while the 1987 and 1988, the tournament was spread out over two days instead.

On March 21, 2024, it was announced that the Crockett Cup would return and would be held in on May 18, at the OC Theatre in Forney, Texas.

=== Storylines ===
The event will feature a number professional wrestling matches with different wrestlers involved in pre-existing scripted feuds, plots, and storylines. Wrestlers are portrayed as either heels (those that portray the "bad guys"), faces (the "good guy" characters), or tweeners (characters that are neither clearly a heel or a face) as they follow a series of tension-building events, which culminate in a wrestling match or series of matches as determined by the promotion. Storylines were played out on the eighteenth season of the NWA's weekly series, Powerrr.

== Results ==
Dark matches
No.	Results	Stipulations
1	The DFW Kartel (Angel Camacho, Hard Harlow, Joey Hyder, and Lou Gotti) defeated 4 TBA by pinfall	Eight-man tag team match
2	Kylie Paige defeated Taylor Rising by pinfall	Singles match
3	Bam Bam Malone defeated 3 TBA by pinfall	Four-way match

First episode (aired on June 18, 2024)
No.	Results	Stipulations	Times
1	The Immortals (Kratos and Odinson) defeated Daisy Kill and Talos (with Vampiro) by pinfall	Crockett Cup quarterfinal match	8:30
2	Tiffany Nieves and Reka Tehaka defeated La Rosa Negra and Ruthie Jay by pinfall	Tag team match to determine the #1 contenders to the NWA World Women's Tag Team Championship	8:43
3	The Southern 6 (Kerry Morton and Alex Taylor) (with Ricky Morton) defeated The Country Gentlemen (AJ Cazana and KC Cazana) (with Joe Cazana) by pinfall	Crockett Cup quarterfinal match	5:47

Second episode (aired on June 25, 2024)
No.	Results	Stipulations	Times
1	Knox and Murdoch defeated The Looks That Kill (Natalia Markova and Bryan Idol) by pinfall	Crockett Cup quarterfinal match	7:32
2	Joe Alonzo (c) defeated Jack Cartwheel by pinfall	Singles match for the NWA World Junior Heavyweight Championship	8:01
3	Blunt Force Trauma (Carnage and Damage) (with Aron Stevens) defeated The Warriors from the Wasteland (Max the Impaler and Judais) (with Father James Mitchell) by pinfall	Crockett Cup quarterfinal match	5:34
(c) / – the champion(s) heading into the match

Third episode (aired on July 2, 2024)
No.	Results	Stipulations	Times
1	Spencer Slade (with Rolando Freeman) defeated Eric Smalls	Grab the Jewels Ladder match The winner gets one free shot to his opponent's family jewels.	12:15
2	Thom Latimer (c) defeated Zyon (with Austin Idol) by pinfall	Singles match for the NWA National Heavyweight Championship	10:17
3	The Southern 6 (Kerry Morton and Alex Taylor) defeated Knox and Murdoch by pinfall	Crockett Cup semifinal match	5:38
(c) / – the champion(s) heading into the match

Fourth episode (aired on July 9, 2024)
No.	Results	Stipulations	Times
1	The Immortals (Kratos and Odinson) defeated Blunt Force Trauma (Carnage and Damage) (with Aron Stevens) by pinfall	Crockett Cup semifinal match	6:12
2	Baron Von Storm (with Jax Dane) defeated Mims (with BLK Jeez) by submission	Singles match	6:03
3	Kenzie Paige (c) (with Kylie Paige) defeated Ella Envy (with Miss Starr) by pinfall	Singles match for the NWA World Women's Championship	9:27
(c) / – the champion(s) heading into the match

Fifth episode (aired on July 16, 2024)
No.	Results	Stipulations	Times
1	The King Bees (Charity King and Danni Bee) (c) defeated Tiffany Nieves and Reka Tehaka by pinfall	Tag team match for the NWA World Women's Tag Team Championship	8:34
2	EC3 (c) defeated Sam Adonis by pinfall	Singles match for the NWA Worlds Heavyweight Championship	9:17
3	The Southern 6 (Kerry Morton and Alex Taylor) defeated The Immortals (Kratos and Odinson) by pinfall	Crockett Cup final	11:43
(c) / – the champion(s) heading into the match

=== 2024 Crockett Cup tournament bracket ===
First round NWA Powerrr (April 12–13)
1	Blunt Force Trauma (Carnage and Damage)	Pin
16	Mike Orlando and The Cheese	4:51
8	The Fixers, L.L.C. (Jay Bradley and Wrecking Ball Legursky)	10:00
9	The Warriors from the Wasteland (Judais and Max the Impaler)	Pin
5	Daisy Kill and Talos	Pin
12	The Stew Crew (Dylan Stewart and Zach Stewart)	6:06
4	The Immortals (Kratos and Odinson)	6:50
13	The Kidz (Alexander Lev and Jackson Drake)	Pin
6	The Savages of Samoa (Alofa and Ativalu)	11:15
11	The Country Gentlemen (AJ Cazana and KC Cazana)	Pin
3	The Southern 6 (Kerry Morton and "Thrillbilly" Silas Mason)^{1}	Pin
14	The Slimeballz (Sage Chantz and Tommy Rant)	6:51
7	Tim Storm and Jax Dane	5:18
10	The Looks That Kill (Natalia Markova and Bryan Idol)	DQ
2	Knox and Murdoch	Pin
15	The Miserably Faithful (Sal Vation and Gaagz the Gymp)	6:01

Quarterfinals; Crockett Cup (May 18)
1	Blunt Force Trauma (Carnage and Damage)	Pin
9	The Warriors from the Wasteland (Judais and Max the Impaler)	5:34
5	Daisy Kill and Talos	8:30
4	The Immortals (Kratos and Odinson)	Pin
11	The Country Gentlemen (AJ Cazana and KC Cazana)	5:47
3	The Southern 6 (Kerry Morton and Alex Taylor)^{1}	Pin
10	The Looks That Kill (Natalia Markova and Bryan Idol)	7:32
2	Knox and Murdoch	Pin

Semifinals; Crockett Cup (May 18)
1	Blunt Force Trauma (Carnage and Damage)	6:12
4	The Immortals (Kratos and Odinson)	Pin
3	The Southern 6 (Kerry Morton and Alex Taylor)	Pin
2	Knox and Murdoch	5:38

Final; Crockett Cup (May 18)
4	The Immortals (Kratos and Odinson)	11:43
3	The Southern 6 (Kerry Morton and Alex Taylor)	Pin

1 Between the NWA Powerrr tapings and Crockett Cup, Silas Mason was injured and not medically cleared to compete. Alex Taylor would step in as his replacement.

== See also ==
- 2024 in professional wrestling
