= Nuff Said (2023) =

2023 National Wrestling Alliance pay-per-view event

- Promotional poster featuring Tyrus
- Promotion: National Wrestling Alliance
- Date: February 11, 2023
- City: Tampa, Florida
- Venue: Egypt Shrine Center

Pay-per-view chronology
← Previous; Hard Times 3	Next → NWA 312

Nuff Said was a professional wrestling pay-per-view (PPV) event promoted by the National Wrestling Alliance (NWA). It took place on February 11, 2023, at the Egypt Shrine Center in Tampa, Florida. The name of the event was based on current NWA Worlds Heavyweight Champion Tyrus, who uses it as his catchphrase, and had a show by the same name on the Fox News streaming network Fox Nation.

Fourteen matches were contested at the event, including four on the pre-show. In the main event, Tyrus defeated Matt Cardona to retain the NWA Worlds Heavyweight Championship. In other prominent matches, Cyon defeated Homicide to retain the NWA National Heavyweight Championship, Kamille defeated Angelina Love in a No Disqualification match to retain the NWA World Women's Championship, and The Renegade Twins (Charlette Renegade and Robyn Renegade) defeated Pretty Empowered (Ella Envy and Kenzie Paige) to win the NWA World Women's Tag Team Championship.

The event garnered mixed reviews from critics, praising the World Women's title match, but criticized EC3 vs. Kevin Kiley Jr. for the latter's performance.

== Production ==
=== Background ===
On December 23, 2022, NWA confirmed that Nuff Said will take place on February 11, 2023, from the Egypt Shrine Center in Tampa, Florida.

=== Storylines ===
The event featured professional wrestling matches that involved different wrestlers from pre-existing scripted feuds and storylines. Wrestlers portrayed heroes, villains, or less distinguishable characters in scripted events that built tension and culminated in a wrestling match or series of matches. The eleventh season of the NWA's weekly flagship program, Powerrr, as well as the fifth season of its secondary program, NWA USA, featured storylines leading up to the event.

At NWA Hard Times 3, Tyrus defeated Trevor Murdoch and Matt Cardona to win the NWA Worlds Heavyweight Championship by pinning Murdoch. Previously, Cardona had defeated Murdoch to win the title himself, but a bicep tear in the summer of 2022 forced him to vacate the title. Murdoch would win it back in a four-way match at Alwayz Ready before eventually losing it in the aforementioned three-way. Two months later, on the special January 31, 2023, live episode of Powerrr, Tyrus and Cardona had a contract signing for their title match at Nuff Said. Before the segment ended, however, both agreed to a six-man tag team match for next week's episode, each choosing two mystery partners. The winners of the match would then choose the stipulation for the world title match. There, Tyrus teamed with Blunt Force Trauma (Carnage and Damage) to defeat Cardona, Mike Knox, and Rolando Freeman, where Tyrus decided the stipulation be a simple one-fall match with all outside interference banned from ringside. Additionally, Bully Ray will provide special guest commentary for the match.

Also on the January 31 live episode of Powerrr, Thom Latimer and NWA World Women's Champion Kamille were scheduled to face Psycho Love (Fodder and Angelina Love) in an intergender tag team match. However, before their match, Psycho Love ambushed Latimer and Kamille on the entrance way, which also saw Fodder choke Latimer out with a singapore cane, causing the match to be cancelled. As a result of this, Love challenged Kamille for her title at Nuff Said in a no disqualification match, while Fodder and Latimer faced off in a singapore cane match.

On the February 4 episode of NWA USA, after Homicide was victorious in his match, he grabbed ring announcer/interviewer Kyle Davis, dragging him to the interview podium before he proceeded to give a promo that had to be censored heavily due to explicit language. He ended the promo calling out the current NWA National Champion Cyon for a match at Nuff Said. He then called out Cyon's manager and father Austin Idol, then proceeded to try to get Austin to fight him before NWA backstage officials intervened. The match would be made official on February 5.

Also on the February 4 NWA USA, NWA Junior Heavyweight Champion Kerry Morton was confronted after his match by Alex Taylor and his manager Danny Dealz. Kerry had led Team Rock n' Roll, of which Taylor was a part of to win the Champions Series, which won title opportunities for each winning member. Danny would announce that Taylor was cashing in his Champion Series title shot for Morton's title at Nuff Said.

Following the last episode of Powerrr before the PPV on February 7, the NWA posted on Instagram a multi picture and video post which revealed several matches added to the card as part of the pre-show.

== Event ==
Other on-screen personnel
Commentators	Joe Galli
Commentators	Tim Storm
Commentators	Velvet Sky (PPV matches 5 through 13)
Commentators	Bully Ray (Final PPV match)
Ring announcer	Kyle Davis
Referees	Jarrod Fritz
Referees	Kevin Keenan
Referees	Scott Wheeler
Interviewer	May Valentine

=== Pre-show ===
Four matches were contested on the pre-show. In the opener, La Rosa Negra faced Missa Kate. In the end, Rosa Negra delivered the "Cookie Crash" for the win.

Next, Dak Draper and Mims took on The Outlaws (with Chris Silvio Esq.). In the end, as Silvio was trying to get involved, but accidentally hit Blake "Bulletproof" Troop, allowing Draper to deliver an inside cradle for the win.

Next, Odison faced Joe Alonzo. The former won after delivering a shoulder tackle and the F10.

In the pre-show main event, Mercurio and Natalia Markova teamed up to take on Jennacide and Max the Impaler (with Amy Rose). The former won after Markova delivered a double-arm DDT.

=== Preliminary matches ===
The main show opened with a Singapore Cane match between Thom Latimer and Fodder. In the end, Latimer delivered a piledriver, before locking in a kendo stick-assisted crossface for the submission win.

Next, Kerry Morton (with Ricky Morton) defended the NWA Junior Heavyweight Championship against Alex Taylor (with Danny Dealz). In the closing stages, as Taylor was possibly looking for a cradle shock, Kerry escaped and planted Taylor with a spinning elbow drop for the win.

Next, "Thrillbilly" Silas Mason (with Pollo Del Mar) took on Kratos. In the end, Kratos crashed face first into an exposed turnbuckle, causing extreme blood loss, and thus allowing Mason to deliver a side headlock on Kratos, which caused him to pass out. After the bell rang, giving Silas the win, Silas proceeded to lick Kratos' blood off of his own hand.

In the eighth bout, Pretty Empowered (Ella Envy and Kenzie Paige) defended the NWA World Women's Tag Team Championship against The Renegade Twins (Charlette Renegade and Robyn Renegade). In the end, The Renegades delivered Renegade's Revenge on Paige, but Envy broke the pin. Paige then pulled Robyn out of the ring, allowing Envy to look for a spinning heel kick, which Charlette blocked and turned into a schoolgirl pin for the win and thus, becoming new champions.

Next, EC3 went one-on-one against Kevin Kiley Jr. In the end, as Kiley was looking for a plancha on the outside of the ring, EC3 ducked out of the way and rolled Kiley back into the ring and made him tap out to "The Purpose".

Next, La Rebelión (Bestia 666 and Mecha Wolf) defended the NWA World Tag Team Championship against Blunt Force Trauma (Carnage and Damage) (with Aron Stevens). In the end, La Rebelión delivered stereo enzeguiris before overpowering Carnage and suplexing Damage. La Rebelión delivered suicide dives, allowing Stevens to hit Bestia 666 with a loaded glove, causing a disqualification.

Next, Trevor Murdoch faced Chris Adonis. In the latter stages, as Murdoch was looking for a top rope bulldog, Adonis avoided it and put on the "Master Lock", forcing Murdoch to pass out giving Adonis the victory.

The next match featured a No Disqualification match for the NWA World Women's Championship, contested between Kamille and Angelina Love. In the closing stages, Kamille brought out a table and put it against the turnbuckle. As Kamille was distracted, Love threw a trash can into Kamille before hitting the "Botox Injection", but Kamille kicked out. As Love was trying to hit Kamille with the title belt, Kamille ducked out of the way and delivered a spear into the table for the three count.

The penultimate match saw Cyon (with Austin Idol) defend the NWA National Heavyweight Championship against Homicide. In the end, as Homicide was looking for a frog splash, Cyon blocked him and hit a superplex. Homicide then delivered the middle finger to Cyon. Cyon then connected with the Death Valley Driver to pickup the victory.

=== Main event ===
The main event was contested between Tyrus and Matt Cardona for the NWA World Heavyweight Championship, with everyone banned from ringside. Tyrus bodyslammed Cardona and splashed him in the corner. Cardona sidestepped Tyrus and delivered three Reboots. Tyrus then inadvertently hit the referee. Rolando Freeman then came and attacked Tyrus with a steel chair. Cardona then hit the title belt on Tyrus, but Tyrus kicked out. As Cardona was in the corner, he moved and Tyrus again inadvertently hit another referee. Mike Knox came down to the ring and delivered a running crossbody to Tyrus. As Knox wanted to use the ring bell, special guest commentator Bully Ray threw Knox into the steel steps. Tyrus then delivered the Tongan death grip on Cardona followed by a chokeslam to pickup the victory. After the match, Ray congratulated Tyrus, and Tyrus agreed to give Ray a title shot anytime he wanted.

== Reception ==
Tommy Martinez of Slam Wrestling reviewed the event and gave it 3 out of 5 stars. He wrote: "[A] solid show that solidifies Tyrus as the undisputed NWA champion. Whether Cardona sticks around to get the belt back is another story. Kudos to The Renegade Twins on their Women's Tag Title win, and Mason really upped the feud with Kratos near the end, and Kamille showed she's hardcore. The rest was by the number, but that isn't a bad thing." Chris Vetter of Pro Wrestling Dot Net gave praise to both the World Women's and National title matches, and commended Kratos-Silas for being "a good brawl that told a decent story", but felt the event had an overabundance of meaningless short bouts and picked EC3-Kiley Jr. as an early contender for worst match of the year. He added that the promotion lacked younger talent in its roster to showcase, singling out Blake Troop as a future star to gain momentum. Justin McClelland of PWTorch felt the event was a "vast improvement" over Hard Times 3 with not as much bad booking, calling Kamille/Love the "best match of the show", Adonis/Murdoch an "excellent hoss fight", and praised Cardona for working a "pretty smart match" against Tyrus during their World title bout. He criticized EC3/Kiley Jr. for the latter's performance, Cyon/Homicide for being too long, and the unexplained moral alignment switches from the wrestlers.

== Aftermath ==
On the following episode of NWA Powerrr, Tyrus successfully defended the NWA Worlds Heavyweight Championship against Rolando Freeman. Before that victory, the former was briefly distracted by EC3 and his manager BLK Jeez. The following week, Joe Galli interviewed EC3 and BLK Jeez about their appearance during the match, the latter explaining his company's name change to "Churchs Money Entertainment" and has entered into an agreement with the former's Control Your Narrative group, though EC3 simply stated that he was only "controlling his narrative". He later went on to challenge Cyon for the NWA National Championship at NWA 312, which would later be made official.

On the February 21 episode of NWA Powerrr, Ella Envy and Roxy (under the name Pretty Empowered 2.0) won back the NWA World Women's Tag Team Championship from the Renegade Twins. After the match, however, Madi Wrenkowski and Missa Kate redeemed the former's Champion Series title opportunity to immediately win the tag titles from them. On March 17, the NWA announced that Pretty Empowered will invoke their rematch clause against Wrenkowski and Kate at NWA 312.

== Results ==
No.	Results	Stipulations	Times
1^{P}	La Rosa Negra defeated Missa Kate by pinfall	Singles match	6:07
2^{P}	Dak Draper and Mims defeated The Outlaws (Jax Dane and Blake "Bulletproof" Troop) (with Chris Silvio, Esq.) by pinfall	Tag team match	7:23
3^{P}	Odinson defeated Joe Alonzo by pinfall	Singles match	6:57
4^{P}	Mercurio and Natalia Markova defeated Jennacide and Max the Impaler (with Amy Rose) by pinfall	Intergender tag team match (Note: Before the match began, it was announced that Jennacide and Max asked for the match to use regular tag team match rules instead of mixed gender tag team rules. The NWA granted the request and the match went ahead with normal tag team match rules.)	6:58
5	Thom Latimer defeated Fodder by submission	Singapore Cane match	6:20
6	Kerry Morton (c) (with Ricky Morton) defeated Alex Taylor (with Danny Dealz) by pinfall	Singles match for the NWA Junior Heavyweight Championship; This was Taylor's Champions Series cash-in match	10:31
7	"Thrillbilly" Silas Mason (with Pollo Del Mar) defeated Kratos by referee stoppage (Note: The stoppage was due to a botched attack that saw Kratos accidentally get severely lacerated on the exposed turnbuckle resulting in extreme blood loss.)	Singles match	10:07
8	The Renegade Twins (Charlette and Robyn Renegade) defeated Pretty Empowered (Kenzie Paige and Ella Envy) (c) by pinfall	Tag team match for the NWA World Women's Tag Team Championship	9:01
9	EC3 defeated Kevin Kiley Jr. by submission	Singles match	8:31
10	La Rebelión (Bestia 666 and Mecha Wolf) (c) defeated Blunt Force Trauma (Carnage and Damage) (with Aron Stevens) by disqualification	Tag team match for the NWA World Tag Team Championship	6:04
11	Chris Adonis defeated Trevor Murdoch by technical submission	Singles match	8:18
12	Kamille (c) defeated Angelina Love by pinfall	No Disqualification match for the NWA World Women's Championship	12:40
13	Cyon (c) (with Austin Idol) defeated Homicide by pinfall	Singles match for the NWA National Heavyweight Championship	16:26
14	Tyrus (c) defeated Matt Cardona by pinfall	Singles match for the NWA Worlds Heavyweight Championship; No one allowed at ringside	13:20
(c) / – the champion(s) heading into the match; P / – the match was broadcast on the pre-show
