= KiLynn King =

American wrestler (born 1991)

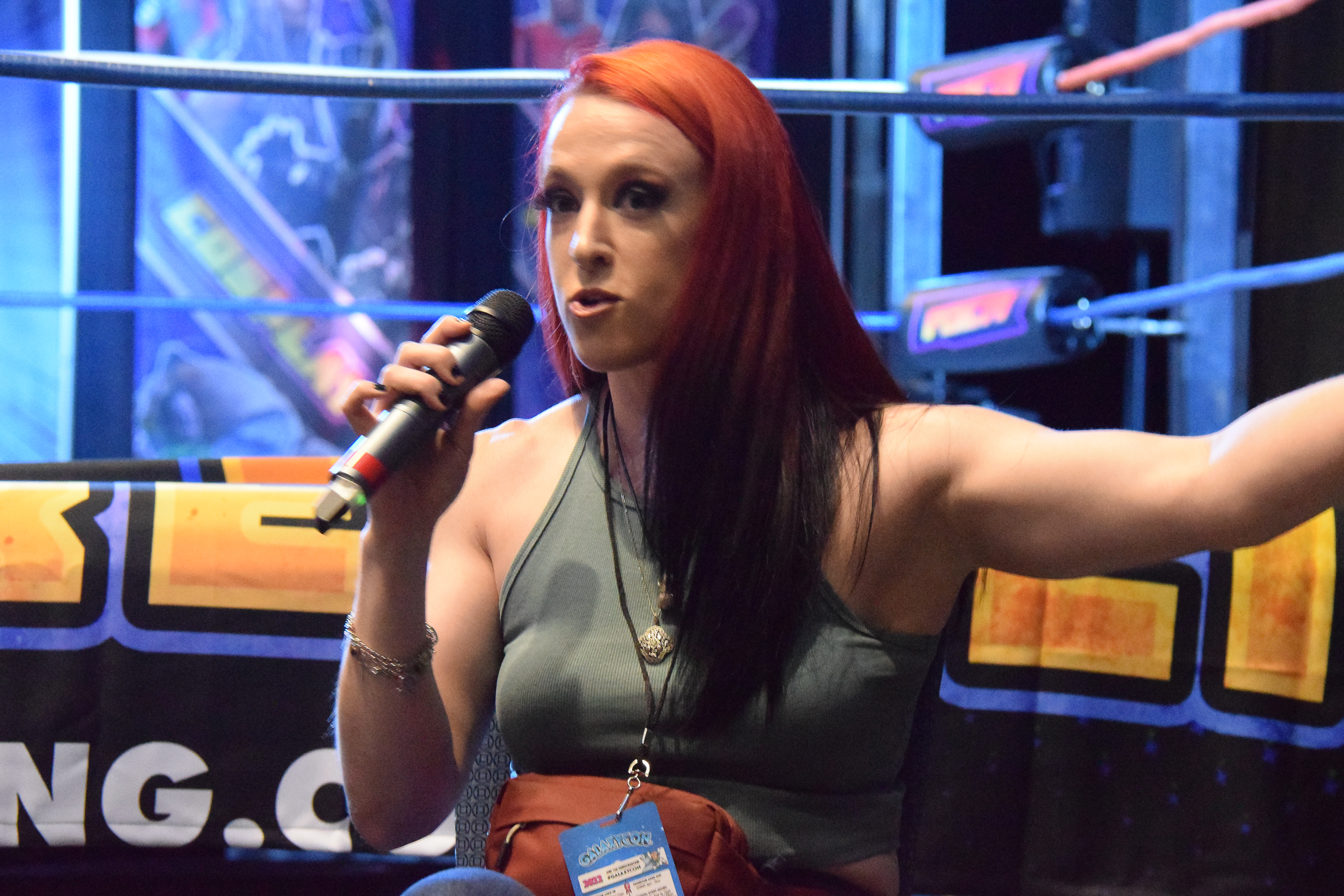
- KiLynn King in July 2022

Personal information
- Born: May 4, 1991 (age 35) Painesville, Ohio, U.S.

Professional wrestling career
- Ring name: KiLynn King
- Billed height: 6 ft 1 in (1.85 m)
- Billed weight: 165 lb (75 kg)
- Billed from: Painesville, Ohio
- Trained by: Billy Gunn; Jay Rios; Jon Cruz; Team 3D Academy
- Debut: 2018

KiLynn King (born May 4, 1991) is an American professional wrestler, signed with Total Nonstop Action Wrestling (TNA), where she is a former one-time Impact Knockouts World Tag Team Champion. Prior to Impact, she wrestled for All Elite Wrestling (AEW), National Wrestling Alliance (NWA). and various independent promotions.

== Professional wrestling career ==
=== All Elite Wrestling (2020–2022) ===
King made her All Elite Wrestling (AEW) debut on May 20, 2020, losing to Penelope Ford on AEW Dark. She made her AEW television debut on July 2, 2020, teaming with Kenzie Paige in a loss to Nyla Rose on Dynamite. On September 5, 2021, King participated in the Casino Battle Royale at All Out. King made her return to AEW on the August 17, 2022, episode of Dynamite, where she lost to Toni Storm.

=== National Wrestling Alliance (2021–2022) ===
On August 28, 2021, King made her debut at National Wrestling Alliance (NWA), when she wrestled at the NWA EmPowerrr pay-per-view, teaming with Red Velvet in the NWA World Women's Tag Team Championship tournament, they defeated The Freebabes (Jazzy Yang and Miranda Gordy) in the first round before losing to The Hex (Allysin Kay and Marti Belle) in the finals.

King made her return to NWA on the April 12, 2022, episode of Powerrr, where she defeated Natalia Markova. On the May 10, 2022, episode of Powerrr, King defeated Chelsea Green and Jennacide to become the number one contender for the NWA World Women's Championship. On June 11, at Alwayz Ready, King challenged the champion Kamille, but was unsuccessful. On November 12, at Hard Times 3, King alongside Green challenged Kamille for the title in a Three-Way match. During the match, King managed to tap out Kamille, but Green distracted the referee, preventing from King to win. At the end of the match, Kamille retained the title.

=== New Japan Pro Wrestling (2022) ===
On October 28, 2022, she made her New Japan Pro-Wrestling (NJPW) debut, where she challenged Mayu Iwatani at Rumble on 44th Street for the SWA World Championship, but was unsuccessful.

=== Total Nonstop Action Wrestling (2022–present) ===
King made her Impact Wrestling debut on the December 22, 2022, episode of Before the Impact (BTI), where she unsuccessfully challenged Taylor Wilde.

In March 2023, she returned to Impact Wrestling, aligning herself with Taylor Wilde, forming a team called The Coven. It was later confirmed that King has signed a contract with Impact. On the March 16, 2023 episode of Impact!, Wilde and King defeated the Death Dollz (Rosemary and Taya Valkyrie) to win the Impact Knockouts World Tag Team Championship. On April 16, at Rebellion, The Coven had their first successful title defense against Jessicka and Rosemary. On the May 11, 2023 episode of Impact!, The Coven successful title defense against Deonna Purrazzo and Jordynne Grace. Post-match, The Coven attacked both Purrazzo and Grace but Trinity runs down to the ring and makes the save. This led into a match between Trinity and King on the May 18 episode of Impact!, where King lost. On the June 8, 2023 episode of Impact!, The Coven successfully defended the Knockouts Tag Team Championships against Death Dollz (Courtney Rush and Jessicka). On July 15, at Slammiversary, The Coven lost their title to MK Ultra (Killer Kelly and Masha Slamovich), ending their reign at 139 days. On August 27, at Emergence, The Coven were set to participate in a four-way tag team match for the Knockouts World Tag Team Championship, however, Wilde was attacked during the pre-show. Jody Threat would later replace Wilde in the match, where MK Ultra retained their titles. On The October 12 episode of Impact!, King admitted to be the one who attacked Wilde with a tire iron, as she felt that Wilde became a deadweight after losing their tag titles.

== Championships and accomplishments ==
- Capital Championship Wrestling
  - CCW Championship (1 time)
  - CCW Network Champion (1 time)
  - CCW Championship Tournament (2021)
- Coastal Championship Wrestling
  - CCW Women's Championship (1 time)
- Gangrel's Wrestling Asylum
  - GWA Women's Championship (1 time, current)
- Impact Wrestling
  - Impact Knockouts World Tag Team Championship (1 time) – with Taylor Wilde
  - Impact Year End Awards (1 time)
    - One to Watch in 2024 (2023)
- Mayhem on Mills
  - Mayhem on Mills Championship (1 time)
- Pro Wrestling 2.0
  - PW2.0 Women's Championship (1 time)
- Pro Wrestling Illustrated
  - Ranked No. 80 of the top 150 female wrestlers in the PWI Women's 150 in 2022
