= Alwayz Ready =

2022 National Wrestling Alliance event

- Promotional poster featuring various NWA wrestlers
- Promotion: National Wrestling Alliance
- Date: June 11, 2022
- City: Knoxville, Tennessee
- Venue: Knoxville Convention Center

Pay-per-view chronology
← Previous; Crockett Cup	Next → 74th Anniversary Show

Alwayz Ready was a professional wrestling pay-per-view (PPV) event promoted by the National Wrestling Alliance. It took place on June 11, 2022 at the Knoxville Convention Center in Knoxville, Tennessee.

Thirteen matches were contested at the event, including two on the pre-show. In the main event, Trevor Murdoch defeated Nick Aldis, Thom Latimer and Sam Shaw in a fatal four-way match for the vacant NWA Worlds Heavyweight Championship. In other prominent matches, The Commonwealth Connection (Doug Williams and Harry Smith) defeated La Rebelión (Bestia 666 and Mecha Wolf 450) to win the NWA World Tag Team Championship and Pretty Empowered (Ella Envy and Kenzie Paige) defeated The Hex (Allysin Kay and Marti Belle) to win the NWA World Women's Tag Team Championship. Also on the show, in the opening bout, Aron Stevens lost to Murdoch in his last match before retiring from wrestling.

== Production ==
Other on-screen personnel
Commentators	Joe Galli
Commentators	Tim Storm
Commentators	Austin Idol (Pre-show; three-way tag team match)
Commentators	Velvet Sky (PPV matches 3 through 11)
Commentators	Bully Ray (Final 2 PPV matches)
Ring announcer	Kyle Davis
Referees	Jarrod Fritz
Referees	Kevin Keenan
Referees	David Weekley
Interviewer	May Valentine

=== Background ===
On April 25, 2022, the National Wrestling Alliance announced that NWA Alwayz Ready would take place on June 11 in Knoxville, Tennessee.

After learning about the NWA's next pay-per-view event taking place in Knoxville, NWA Worlds Heavyweight Champion Matt Cardona, in storyline, demanded that the event be dedicated to him if he was going to wrestle in the city. This included his entrance music ("When The Lights Go Down" by Downstait) acting as the show's main theme song, promotional material to feature his brand and likeness, a modified NWA logo that reads "MCWA" (Matt Cardona Wrestling Alliance), and even the event's name being his catchphrase.

=== Storylines ===
The event features professional wrestling matches that involve different wrestlers from pre-existing scripted feuds and storylines. Wrestlers portray heroes, villains, or less distinguishable characters in scripted events that build tension and culminate in a wrestling match or series of matches. Storylines were produced during the eighth season and second season, respectively, of the NWA's weekly series; Powerrr and USA.

On the Powerrr after the Crockett Cup, NWA World Television Champion Tyrus and manager Austin Idol announced an open Bodyslam Challenge, where if anybody was able to bodyslam Tyrus in three attempts, they would earn a title match. On May 3, Matthew Mims answered the challenge, and despite foul play from Tyrus, Mims was able to slam the champion. On May 5, it was confirmed the Mims would have his television title match with Tyrus at Alwayz Ready.

On the May 10 episode of Powerrr, KiLynn King defeated Chelsea Green and Jennacide in a three-way match to become the number one contender to the NWA World Women's Championship, earning a title match against Kamille at Alwayz Ready.

On Night 2 of the Crockett Cup, Matt Cardona retained the NWA Worlds Heavyweight Championship against Nick Aldis via disqualification, after special guest referee Jeff Jarrett believed Aldis' wife Mickie James gave him a low blow when it was in fact Cardona's wife Chelsea Green. On May 11, the NWA announced a rematch between the two for Alwayz Ready, with both men having requested a special stipulation. Aldis asked for a steel cage match, while Cardona proposed a deathmatch. NWA president Billy Corgan would select the stipulation at a future date. At Game Changer Wrestling's Downward Spiral event, Cardona suffered a torn biceps and would require surgery. Cardona confirmed he would still appear at the event but would not be able to compete.

After losing the NWA Worlds Heavyweight Championship to Matt Cardona at NWA PowerrrTrip, Trevor Murdoch began adopting a more aggressive side to his wrestling skills, being much more deliberate in defeating his opponents. Around this time, his friends Aron Stevens and The Pope would call out Murdoch, hoping to figure out what was going through his head and to try and knock some sense into him. Stevens would eventually confront Murdoch in a match on the April 26 episode of Powerrr, only to be defeated. The week after that, Stevens formally announced his retirement from professional wrestling. On May 23, the NWA announced that Stevens would have his last match, dubbed "Aron Stevens' Swan Song", against Murdoch at Alwayz Ready.

== Reception ==
Tommy Martinez of Slam Wrestling reviewed the event and gave it 4 out of 5 stars, praising the main event for allowing Latimer and Shaw to be "worthy contenders" to the NWA World Title alongside Aldis and Murdoch, and felt that Kamille and King had "an outstanding match" during their World Women's Title bout. He concluded that: "While some matches could have been cut from the PPV, this was one of the better shows the NWA has brought to fans." Christopher Maitland of PWTorch praised Homicide's performance in both of his Junior Heavyweight Title defenses, the men's and women's Tag Team Title bouts being improvements from their Crockett Cup predecessors, the World Women's Title match for both competitors' performances, and the World Title main event but was critical of the "convoluted and lengthy" segment that preceded it and the uninspired choice of Murdoch as champion.

== Aftermath ==
On the July 2 episode of USA, Pretty Empowered would successfully defend the NWA World Women's Tag Team Championship in a third match against The Hex, after Ella Envy struck Allysin Kay with one of the title belts. On August 3, after an episode of Busted Open Radio, it was announced that Pretty Empowered will defend the titles against The Hex again in a Kingshighway Street Fight on Night 2 of NWA 74.

On the July 5 episode of Powerrr, Kyle Davis interviewed NWA World Junior Heavyweight Champion Homicide giving praise to Kerry and Ricky Morton, but claimed the former lacked the "it" factor to thrive in professional wrestling, but still offered him a title shot at NWA 74. Kerry responded the following week, talking about how the championship was once held by his father, and that he wanted to uphold the prestige of that title.

On the July 26 "EmPowerrred" edition of Powerrr, Taya Valkyrie defeated KiLynn King to become the number one contender for the NWA World Women's Championship. Later in the main event, current champion Kamille defeated Chelsea Green to retain the title, with her and Valkyrie facing each other in the main event of Night 1 of NWA 74.

On the August 2 episode of Powerrr, Cyon, the newest member of Austin Idol's stable Idolmania Sports Management, defeated Rodney Mack in an NWA National Heavyweight Championship number one contender's match, earning him a title shot against champion Jax Dane on Night 1 of NWA 74.

On August 5, NWA announced that Matt Cardona would make his in-ring return on Night 1 of NWA 74, facing an opponent of his choosing.

== Results ==
No.	Results	Stipulations	Times
1^{P}	Rodney Mack defeated "Magic" Jake Dumas (with Christi Jaynes) by pinfall	Singles match	5:16
2^{P}	The Mortons (Ricky and Kerry) defeated The Country Gentlemen (AJ Cazana and Anthony Andrews) (with Joe Cazana) and The Ill Begotten (Alex Taylor and Jeremiah Plunkett) (with Danny Dealz) by pinfall	Three-way tag team match	6:58
3	Trevor Murdoch defeated Aron Stevens by pinfall	Singles match (Note: This match was billed as Aron Stevens' Swan Song (Stevens' last match).)	4:38
4	Pretty Empowered (Ella Envy and Kenzie Paige) defeated The Hex (Allysin Kay and Marti Belle) (c) by pinfall	Tag team match for the NWA World Women's Tag Team Championship	8:35
5	Homicide (c) defeated PJ Hawx by pinfall	Singles match for the NWA World Junior Heavyweight Championship	10:50
6	Homicide (c) defeated Colby Corino by pinfall	Singles match for the NWA World Junior Heavyweight Championship; This was Corino's Champions Series cash-in match	9:06
7	Natalia Markova (with Taryn Terrell) defeated Taya Valkyrie by pinfall	Singles match	8:43
8	Jax Dane (c) defeated Chris Adonis by pinfall	Singles match for the NWA National Championship	10:19
9	Thom Latimer defeated Cyon (with Austin Idol) by pinfall	Singles match	12:30
10	Tyrus (c) (with BLK Jeez) defeated Mims by pinfall	Singles match for the NWA World Television Championship	8:37
11	The Commonwealth Connection (Doug Williams and Harry Smith) defeated La Rebelión (Bestia 666 and Mecha Wolf 450) (c) by pinfall	Tag team match for the NWA World Tag Team Championship	13:54
12	Kamille (c) defeated KiLynn King by pinfall	Singles match for the NWA World Women's Championship	17:25
13	Trevor Murdoch defeated Nick Aldis, Sam Shaw and Thom Latimer by pinfall	Fatal four-way match for the vacant NWA Worlds Heavyweight Championship (Note: Defending champion Matt Cardona was not able to compete because of his biceps injury.)	18:10
(c) / – the champion(s) heading into the match; P / – the match was broadcast on the pre-show

== See also ==
- 2022 in professional wrestling
