= Renegade Twins =

Tag team
- Members: Charlette Renegade; Robyn Renegade
- Name: Renegade Twins
- Debut: January 17, 2020
- Years active: 2020–present
- Trained by: Q. T. Marshall

The Renegade Twins are a professional wrestling tag team signed to All Elite Wrestling (AEW) and Ring of Honor (ROH). The team consists of real life twin sisters Charlette and Robin Williamson (born April 14, 2000), known by their ring names Charlette Renegade and Robyn Renegade, respectively. They have also competed in the National Wrestling Alliance (NWA), where they are the former one-time NWA World Women's Tag Team Champions.

== History ==
The Renegade Twins debuted in All Elite Wrestling on the January 11, 2022, episode of AEW Dark where they faced TayJay (Anna Jay and Tay Conti) in a losing effort. They appeared again on the March 28 episode of AEW Dark: Elevation where they faced the team of Anna Jay and Ruby Soho and also lost. On the July 19 episode of AEW Dark, they had their first win in AEW when they defeated Avery Breaux and Valentina Rossi.

On the December 24, 2022, episode of the NWA Christmas Special, the Renegade Twins made their NWA debut, losing to the NWA World Women's Tag Team Champions Pretty Empowered (Ella Envy and Kenzie Paige). On the February 7, 2023, episode of NWA Powerrr, they defeated Pretty Empowered, which earned the twins a title shot at Nuff Said. On February 11, at Nuff Said, the Renegade Twins defeated Pretty Empowered to win the NWA World Women's Tag Team Championship, but then lost the titles on the February 21 episode of NWA Powerrr to Pretty Empowered 2.0.

The Renegade Twins made their Ring of Honor debut on the March 2, 2023, episode of Ring of Honor Wrestling, losing to Madison Rayne and Skye Blue. They would have their first ROH win on the July 27 episode of Ring of Honor Wrestling, defeating JC and Tiara James. On the August 10 episode of Ring of Honor Wrestling, Robyn lost to Billie Starkz, leading the Renegades to attack Starkz, which was stopped by Athena.

On the February 10, 2024, taping of Ring of Honor Wrestling, Robyn Renegade had another match against Billie Starkz- this time, a first round tournament match to determine the inaugural ROH Women's World Television Championship holder. Robyn was once more unsuccessful at defeating Billie Starkz, who advanced in the tournament.

== Championships and accomplishments ==
- Capital Championship Wrestling
  - CCW Tag Team Championship (1 time)
- Mission Pro Wrestling
  - MPW Tag Team Championship (1 time, inaugural)
  - MPW Year-End Award (1 time)
    - Tag Team of the Year Award (2021)
- National Wrestling Alliance
  - NWA World Women's Tag Team Championship (1 time)
- Pro Wrestling Illustrated
  - Ranked No. 73 of the top 100 Tag Teams in the PWI Tag Team 100 in 2022
- Ultimate Women of Wrestling
  - UWW Tag Team Championship (1 time, inaugural)
