= Pretty Empowered =

Tag team
- Name(s): Pretty Empowered; Pretty Empowered 2.0
- Leader: Kenzie Paige
- Members: Kylie Paige
- Former members: Roxy; Ella Envy
- Debut: March 20, 2022
- Years active: 2022–present

Pretty Empowered is a professional wrestling tag team currently signed to the National Wrestling Alliance (NWA) consisting of sisters Kenzie Paige and Kylie Paige. Kenzie is a former one-time NWA World Women's Champion and a former NWA World Women's Television Champion. As a stable, the group are 4-time NWA World Women's Tag Team Champions.

== History ==
On March 20, 2022 at the Crockett Cup, Envy and Paige, under the name Pretty Empowered, made their NWA debut together, losing to the NWA World Women's Tag Team Champions The Hex. On June 11, 2022, at Alwayz Ready, Pretty Empowered defeated the Hex to win the World Women's Tag Team Championships. This would lead them to a rematch against The Hex on the NWA 74th Anniversary Show for said championships, successfully defending in a Street Fight where Paige also turned heel. On September 27, at Pretty Empowered Surge in which they hosted, Envy and Paige introduced Roxy as their third member of Pretty Empowered. On December 24, 2022, at NWA Christmas Special, Envy and Paige defeated The Renegade Twins who had made their NWA debut.

On the February 7, 2023 episode of NWA Powerrr, Envy and Roxy lost to the Renegade Twins, which earned the latter a title shot at Nuff Said. On February 11, at Nuff Said, Envy and Paige lost their NWA World Women's Tag Team Championship bout to the Renegade Twins by pinfall. On the February 21 episode of NWA Powerrr, Envy and Roxy (known in that match as Pretty Empowered 2.0) won the women's tag team titles from the Renegade Twins, bringing it back to the stable. After the match, however, M95 (Madi Wrenkowski and Missa Kate) utilized the former's Champion Series title opportunity to immediately win the titles from Pretty Empowered.

Kenzie entered the NWA Women's Television Championship inaugural tournament, and on the March 14 episode of Powerrr, she defeated Ashley D'Amboise to advance to the final. On April 7, at NWA 312, Paige defeated Max the Impaler in the tournament final to win the NWA World Women's Television Championship. On the August 8 episode of Powerrr, Envy defeated Missa Kate to earn herself and Kylie Paige an NWA World Women's Tag Team Championship match against M95 (Missa Kate and Madi Wrenkowski) at NWA 75. On August 26, at the first night of NWA 75th Anniversary Show, Kenzie lost the NWA World Women's TV title to Max the Impaler. Later that night however, she won the Burke Invitational Gauntlet Match, earning her the right to challenge Women's World Champion Kamille the following night. On night 2 of NWA 75, Envy and Kylie defeated M95 to win the Women's World tag team titles, while Kenzie defeated Kamille to win the Women's World title. On the October 24 episode of Powerrr, Envy, Kenzie and Kylie turned on Roxy after telling her she had lost her "pretty privileges", kicking her out of the group.

On The February 27, 2024, episode of Powerrr, Pretty Empowered lost their World Women's Tag Team Championship to The King Bees (Charity King and Danni Bee). On The June 11, 2024, episode of Powerrr, Envy announced her departure from Pretty Empowered.

On August 16, 2025 at NWA 77th Anniversary Show, Kenzie lost the NWA World Women's Championship to Natalia Markova, ending her two-year reign.

On the June 13, 2026 episode of NWA Powerrr, Kenzie and Kylie Paige won the NWA World Women's Tag Team Championship in a triple threat match.

== Members ==
*	Founding member(s)
L	Leader

=== Current ===
Member	Joined
Kenzie Paige (L)	March 20, 2022*
Kylie Paige	May 30, 2022

=== Former ===
Member	Joined	Left
Roxy	September 27, 2022	October 24, 2023
Ella Envy*	March 20, 2022	June 11, 2024

== Championships and accomplishments ==
- National Wrestling Alliance
  - NWA World Women's Championship (1 time) – Kenzie Paige
  - NWA World Women's Television Championship (1 time, inaugural) – Kenzie
  - NWA World Women's Tag Team Championship (4 times) – Ella Envy and Kenzie (1), Envy and Roxy (1), Envy and Kylie (1), Kenzie and Kylie (1)
  - NWA World Women's Television Championship Tournament (2023) – Kenzie
  - First NWA Women's Triple Crown Champion – Kenzie
  - First NWA Women's Grand Slam Champion – Kenzie
  - NWA Kross Fire Wrestling Champion
- New South Pro Wrestling
  - New South Tag Team Championship (1 time) – Envy and Kenzie
- NWA JCP Southeast
  - NWA JCP Women's Championship (1 time, current) – Kylie
- Pro Wrestling Illustrated
  - Singles wrestlers
    - Ranked Ella No. 152 of the PWI Women's 250 in 2023
    - Ranked Kenzie No. 33 of the PWI Women's 250 in 2023
    - Ranked Kenzie No. 245 of the top 500 singles wrestlers in the PWI 500 in 2023
    - Ranked Kylie No. 158 of the PWI Women's 250 in 2023
  - Tag teams
    - Ranked Ella, Kenzie, Kylie, Roxy No. 71 of the top 100 Tag Teams in the PWI Tag Team 100 in 2022
