= Ella Envy =

American professional wrestler (born 2000)

Personal information
- Born: August 31, 2000 (age 26) North Carolina, U.S.

Professional wrestling career
- Ring name: Ella Envy
- Trained by: Fire Star Pro Wrestling
- Debut: December 28, 2019

Madison Hardin (born August 31, 2000), better known by the ring name Ella Envy, is an American professional wrestler. She performed for the National Wrestling Alliance (NWA), where she was a four-time NWA World Women's Tag Team Champion and a former member of Pretty Empowered.

== Professional wrestling career ==
=== National Wrestling Alliance (2022–2025) ===
On March 20, 2022 at the Crockett Cup, Envy and Paige, under the name Pretty Empowered, made their NWA debut together, losing to the NWA World Women's Tag Team Champions The Hex. On June 11, at Alwayz Ready, Pretty Empowered defeated the Hex to win the World Women's Tag Team Championships. This would lead them to a rematch against The Hex on the NWA 74th Anniversary Show for said championships, successfully defending in a Street Fight where Paige also turned heel alongside Envy. On September 27, at Pretty Empowered Surge in which they hosted, Envy and Paige introduced Roxy as their third member of Pretty Empowered. On December 24, 2022, at NWA Christmas Special, Envy and Paige defeated The Renegade Twins who had made their NWA debut.

On the February 7, 2023 episode of NWA Powerrr, Envy and Roxy lost to the Renegade Twins, which earned the latter a title shot at Nuff Said. On February 11, at Nuff Said, Envy and Paige lost their NWA World Women's Tag Team Championship bout to the Renegade Twins by pinfall. On the February 21 episode of NWA Powerrr, Envy and Roxy (known in that match as Pretty Empowered 2.0) won the women's tag team titles from the Renegade Twins, bringing it back to the stable. This did not last long, however, as Madi Wrenkowski and Missa Kate utilized the former's Champion Series title opportunity to immediately win the titles from Envy and Roxy. On the August 8 episode of Powerrr, Envy defeated Missa Kate to earn herself and Kylie Paige an NWA World Women's Tag Team title match against M95 (Kate and Madi Wrenkowski) at NWA 75. On night two of that event, Envy and Kylie defeated M95 to win the Women's World tag team titles.

On The February 27, 2024, episode of Powerrr, Envy and Kylie lost their World Women's Tag Team Championship to The King Bees (Charity King and Danni Bee). On The June 11, 2024, episode of Powerrr, Envy announced her departure from Pretty Empowered.

== Championships and accomplishments ==
- National Wrestling Alliance
  - NWA World Women's Tag Team Championship (4 times) – with Kenzie Paige (1), Roxy (1), Kylie Paige (1) and Miss Starr (1)
- New South Pro Wrestling
  - New South Tag Team Championship (1 time) – with Kenzie Paige
- Pro Wrestling Illustrated
  - Ranked No. 71 of the top 100 Tag Teams in the PWI Tag Team 100 in 2022 – with Kenzie Paige
