= Mims (wrestler) =

American professional wrestler

Matthew Mims, or "Big Strong" Mims, is an American professional wrestler signed to the National Wrestling Alliance (NWA), where he is a former National Heavyweight and World Television Champion.

== Professional Wrestling Career ==
Mims began his professional wrestling career with the NWA in 2019. Through 2021, he became a staple on the flagship show NWA Powerrr, facing the likes of Eli Drake, Tyrus, Nick Aldis, and Jax Dane. At Alwayz Ready in 2022, Mims was unsuccessful in challenging Tyrus for the NWA World Television Championship. He continued to challenge for the belt with further matches against Tyrus and subsequent champion Jordan Clearwater.

On August 29, 2023, Mims defeated Zicky Dice to win the vacant NWA World Heavyweight Television Championship. He had successful title defenses against Carson Drake, Dak Draper, and Jeremiah Plunket, before losing the title to Max the Impaler in a title unification match.

On August 31, 2024 (aired on October 8, 2024) at the NWA 76th Anniversary Show, Mims defeated Bryan Idol, Burchill, and Carson Drake in a Four-way elimination match for the vacant NWA National Heavyweight Championship. As champion, Mims has successful title defenses against opponents such as Burchill, Mike Mondo, EC3 and Max the Impaler. Mims held the belt until the NWA 77th Anniversary Show, losing the title to Mike Mondo.

== Championships and accomplishments ==
- CCP Podcasting
  - CCP Podcasting Heavyweight Championship (1 time, current)
- National Wrestling Alliance
  - NWA National Heavyweight Championship (1 time)
  - NWA World Television Championship (1 time)
- Pro Wrestling Illustrated
  - Ranked No. 100 in the PWI 500 in 2025
