= The King Bees (professional wrestling) =

Stable
- Members: Charity King; Danni Bee
- Name(s): The King Bees; Charity King; Danni Bee
- Debut: December 10, 2022
- Years active: 2022–present

The King Bees are a professional wrestling tag team consisting of Charity King and Danni Bee. They are currently signed to National Wrestling Alliance (NWA), where they are former one-time NWA World Women's Tag Team Champions.

== History ==
=== Independent circuit (2022–present) ===
On December 10, 2022, Charity King and Danni Bee made their first appearance as a team named The King Bees during an Mission Pro Wrestling (MPW) show, were they unsuccessfully challenged Bougie Reality (Madi Wrenkowski and Rache Chanel) for their MPW Tag Team Championship in a "Candy Cane Lane" Street fight. On May 20, 2024, after becoming the NWA World Women's Tag Team Champions The King Bees put their titles on their line in a Winner Takes All match, where they defeated the MPW Tag Team Champions Dream World (Kiah Dream and Maya World) to win their titles.

=== National Wrestling Alliance (2023–2024) ===
On The November 14, 2023, episode of NWA Powerrr', The King Bees made their National Wrestling Alliance (NWA) debut where they challenged Pretty Empowered (Ella Envy and Kylie Paige) for their NWA World Women's Tag Team Championship, however, were unsuccessful. On The February 27, 2024, episode of Powerrr, The King Bees defeated Pretty Empowered to win their titles. On the April 9 edition of Hard Times, The King Bees defeated Pretty Empowered once again in a two-out-of-three-falls match to retain their titles. On July 1, NWA announced that they have signed The King Bees to an exclusive deal.

=== Total Nonstop Action Wrestling (2025) ===
On the February 13, 2025, episode of TNA Impact!, The King Bees made their Total Nonstop Action Wrestling (TNA) debut in a losing effort against Ash by Elegance and Heather by Elegance.

== Championships and accomplishments ==
- Mission Pro Wrestling
  - MPW Tag Team Champions (1 time)
- National Wrestling Alliance
  - NWA World Women's Tag Team Championship (1 time)
