= Kylie Paige =

American professional wrestler (born 2003)

Personal information
- Born: Kylie Alexa Henry; December 11, 2003 (age 22) Sevierville, Tennessee, U.S.

Professional wrestling career
- Ring name(s): Kylie Paige; Kylie Alexa
- Billed height: 5 ft 2 in (1.57 m)
- Trained by: Kane; Tom Prichard
- Debut: May 27, 2022

Kylie Alexa Henry (born December 11, 2003), known by her ring names Kylie Alexa and Kylie Paige, is an American professional wrestler. She is signed to the National Wrestling Alliance (NWA), where she is a member of Pretty Empowered alongside her elder sister Kenzie Paige. She is the former two-time NWA World Women's Tag Team Champion in with alongside Kenzie.

== Professional wrestling career ==
Like her sister Kenzie Paige, Henry got her start in her father's Wrestling Promotion Kross Fire Wrestling in Sevierville, Tennessee.

Henry made her NWA in-ring debut on the March 25, 2023 of NWA USA under the ring name Kylie Paige. By May, she had joined Pretty Empowered. On the August 8 episode of Powerrr, Ella Envy defeated Missa Kate to earn herself and Kylie Paige an NWA World Women's Tag Team Championship match against M95 (Missa Kate and Madi Wrenkowski) at NWA 75. At the second night of NWA 75th Anniversary Show, Envy and Kylie defeated M95 to win the Women's World tag team titles. They held the titles until the February 27, 2024, episode of Powerrr, when they lost it to The King Bees (Charity King and Danni Bee).

In May 2024, Paige herself won the NWA JCP Women's Championship.

On the June 13, 2026 episode of NWA Powerrr, Kenzie and Kylie Paige won the NWA World Women's Tag Team Championship in a triple threat match.

== Championships and accomplishments ==
- National Wrestling Alliance
  - NWA World Women's Tag Team Championship (2 times) – with Ella Envy (1) and Kenzie Paige (1)
  - NWA Year End Awards
    - Hot Prospect of the Next Year (2025)
- NWA JCP Southeast
  - NWA JCP Women's Championship (1 time, current)
