= Kenzie Paige =

American professional wrestler (born 2002)

Personal information
- Born: Kenzie Paige Henry; March 5, 2002 (age 24) Sevierville, Tennessee, U.S.

Professional wrestling career
- Ring name(s): Kenzie Paige; Kenzie Paige Henry
- Billed height: 5 ft 6 in (1.68 m)
- Billed weight: 125 lb (57 kg)
- Trained by: Kane; Tom Prichard; Ricky Morton
- Debut: December 16, 2016

Kenzie Paige Henry (born March 5, 2002), known by her ring name Kenzie Paige, is an American professional wrestler. She is signed to the National Wrestling Alliance (NWA) where she is the leader of Pretty Empowered. In the NWA, she is the inaugural NWA World Women's Television Champion, the former three-time NWA World Women's Tag Team Champion with alongside her younger sister Kylie Paige, and a former one-time NWA World Women's Champion.

== Professional wrestling career ==
=== Early career ===
Paige got her start in her father's Wrestling Promotion Kross Fire Wrestling in Sevierville, Tennessee. Paige made her national TV debut on the May 6, 2020 episode of AEW Dynamite losing to Nyla Rose in a squash match.

=== National Wrestling Alliance (2021–present) ===
==== Early appearances (2021–2022) ====
On the June 15, 2021 episode of NWA Powerrr, Paige made her NWA debut, losing to Melina in a three-way match which also involved Jennacide. Her next match was on the August 3 episode of Powerrr where, during the Champions Series, she defeated Lady Frost, marking Paige's first win in NWA. During the NWA EmPowerrr pre-show, she lost to Paola Blaze (accompanied by Taryn Terrell) in a match that didn't air due to technical issues. At By Any Means Necessary, Paige faced Kamille in a two-out-of-three falls match for the NWA World Women's Championship, only to lose the match two to none.

==== Pretty Empowered (2022–present) ====
On March 20, 2022 at the Crockett Cup, Ella Envy and Paige, under the name Pretty Empowered, made their NWA debut together, losing to the NWA World Women's Tag Team Champions The Hex. On June 11, at Alwayz Ready, Pretty Empowered defeated the Hex to win the World Women's Tag Team Championships. This would lead them to a rematch against The Hex on the NWA 74th Anniversary Show for said championships, successfully defending in a Street Fight where Paige also turned heel alongside Envy. On September 27, at Pretty Empowered Surge in which they hosted, Envy and Paige introduced Roxy as their third member of Pretty Empowered.

On December 24, 2022, at NWA Christmas Special, Envy and Paige defeated The Renegade Twins who had made their NWA debut. On the February 7, 2023 episode of NWA Powerrr, Envy and Roxy lost to the Renegade Twins, which earned the latter a title shot at Nuff Said. On February 11, at Nuff Said, the Envy and Paige lost their NWA World Women's Tag Team Championship bout to the Renegade Twins by pinfall.

Paige entered the NWA Women's Television Championship inaugural tournament, and on the March 14 episode of Powerrr, she defeated Ashley D'Amboise to advance to the final. On April 7, at NWA 312, Paige defeated Max the Impaler in the tournament final to win the NWA World Women's Television Championship. On the April 25 episode of Powerrr, she defeated Ella Envy to retain the title.

On Night One of the NWA 75th Anniversary Show, Paige lost the title to Max the Impaler, but won the Burke Invitational Gauntlet later to earn an NWA World Women's Championship match the following night. On Night Two, she defeated Kamille to win the World Women's Championship. By winning the title, Paige became the youngest NWA World Women's Champions at 21 years old, and the first NWA Women's Triple Crown Champion. On The September 12 episode of Powerrr, Paige had her first successful title defense by defeating Samantha Starr. On the October 24 episode of Powerrr, Pretty Empowered turned on Roxy, kicking her out of their group.

With NWA returning to the territories system, Paige was announced on April 24, 2024 to helm their newest edition Kross Fire Wrestling (KFW), which based in Sevierville, Tennessee. On December 14, 2024, at NWA Looks That Kill, she won the NWA World Women's Tag Team Championship for the second time, this time with Big Mama. Her sister Kylie was originally scheduled to compete, but due to a shoulder injury, Paige took her place.

On August 16, 2025 at NWA 77th Anniversary Show, Paige lost the NWA World Women's Championship to Natalia Markova, ending her two-year reign. On October 3, 2025, at night one of Kross Fire Wrestling’s Black Harvest event, Paige defeated Jackson Drake and defending champion Juventud Guerrera in a triple threat match to claim the NWA Kross Fire Wrestling Championship.

On the June 13, 2026 episode of NWA Powerrr, Kenzie and Kylie Paige won the NWA World Women's Tag Team Championship in a triple threat match.

== Championships and accomplishments ==
- National Wrestling Alliance
  - NWA World Women's Tag Team Championship (3 times) – with Ella Envy (1), Big Mama (1) and Kylie Paige (1)
  - NWA World Women's Television Championship (1 time, inaugural)
  - NWA World Women's Championship (1 time)
  - NWA World Women's Television Championship Tournament (2023)
  - Burke Invitational Gauntlet (2023)
  - First NWA Women's Triple Crown Champion
  - First NWA Women's Grand Slam Champion
  - NWA Kross Fire Wrestling Champion
- Joe Cazana Promotions (JCP)
  - JCP Women's Championship (1 Time)
- New South Pro Wrestling
  - New South Championship (1 time)
  - New South Tag Team Championship (2 times) – with Dillon McQueen (1) and Ella Envy (1)
- Pro Wrestling Illustrated
  - Ranked No. 33 of the top 250 female singles wrestlers in the PWI Women's 250 in 2023
  - Ranked No. 71 of the top 100 Tag Teams in the PWI Tag Team 100 in 2022 – with Ella Envy
  - Ranked No. 245 of the top 500 singles wrestlers in the PWI 500 in 2023
