= Tim Storm =

American professional wrestler (born 1964)

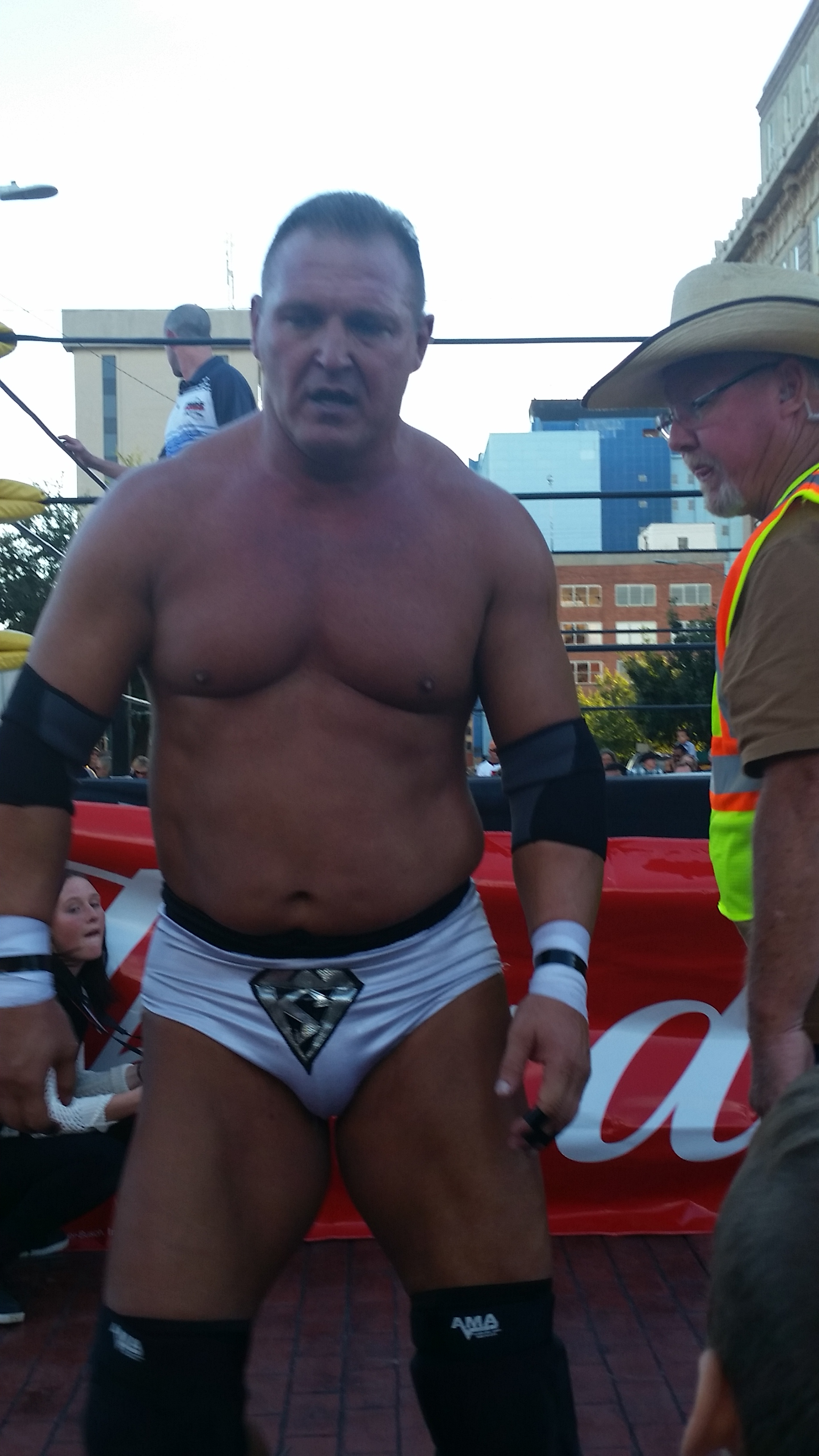
- Storm in 2016

Personal information
- Born: Timothy Scoggins; February 18, 1964 (age 62) Pine Bluff, Arkansas, U.S.
- Children: 2

Professional wrestling career
- Ring name(s): Tim Storm; Baron Von Storm
- Billed height: 6 ft 3 in (191 cm)
- Billed weight: 260 lb (118 kg)
- Trained by: Bill Ash
- Debut: September 26, 1998

Timothy Scoggins (born February 18, 1964), better known by his ring name Tim Storm, is an American professional wrestler and sports commentator signed to the National Wrestling Alliance (NWA), where he performs under the ring name Baron Von Storm and is a former NWA World Heavyweight Champion and holds the record as the oldest wrestler to have held the title.

== Professional wrestling career ==
=== Early career (1995–2015) ===
In the mid-1990s, Storm initially trained for professional wrestling with Bill Ash. After moving to Texas, Storm pursued little wrestling work in the late 1990s.

In 2001, Storm debuted for the Arlington, Texas-based Professional Championship Wrestling, where he would spend a majority of his career. Storm formed the Dark Circle with longtime partner Apocalypse and Shadow. Storm and Apocalypse would win the PCW tag team titles twice between 2002 and 2004, while in August 2005 Storm captured the PCW Heavyweight Championship, defeating Steve DeMarco in a steel cage match and would have one of the promotion's longest reigns as champion. Storm lost the PCW title in May 2006 to Mace Malone. Storm & Apocalypse would recapture the PCW tag team titles in May 2007. On July 17, 2007, Storm wrestled Big Daddy V on an episode of ECW on Syfy. In 2008, Storm feuded with Franco D'Angelo. D'Angelo defeated Storm in a hair vs. hair match which led to Storm briefly wearing a mask until losing a mask match to Shadow. Later in 2008, Storm joined Mike Foxx's Faithful stable and in 2009, he captured the PCW tag team titles for a 5th time with James Johnson.

In 2010, Storm began working for the Arkansas-based National Wrestling Alliance (NWA) affiliated Traditional Championship Wrestling (TCW). He joined forces once more with his former partner Apocalypse, wrestling again as The Dark Circle. Together, they held the TCW Tag Team Championships during the months of June through August. Storm challenged for the TCW International Heavyweight Championship on August 20 in a losing effort to the champion Jeff Jett at TCW Back To School Bash. On August 21, Storm wrestled a series of three matches (being his last for the 2010 year) at TCW Throwdown In The Downtown IV including a tag team title match, and two consecutive singles matches, winning all three.

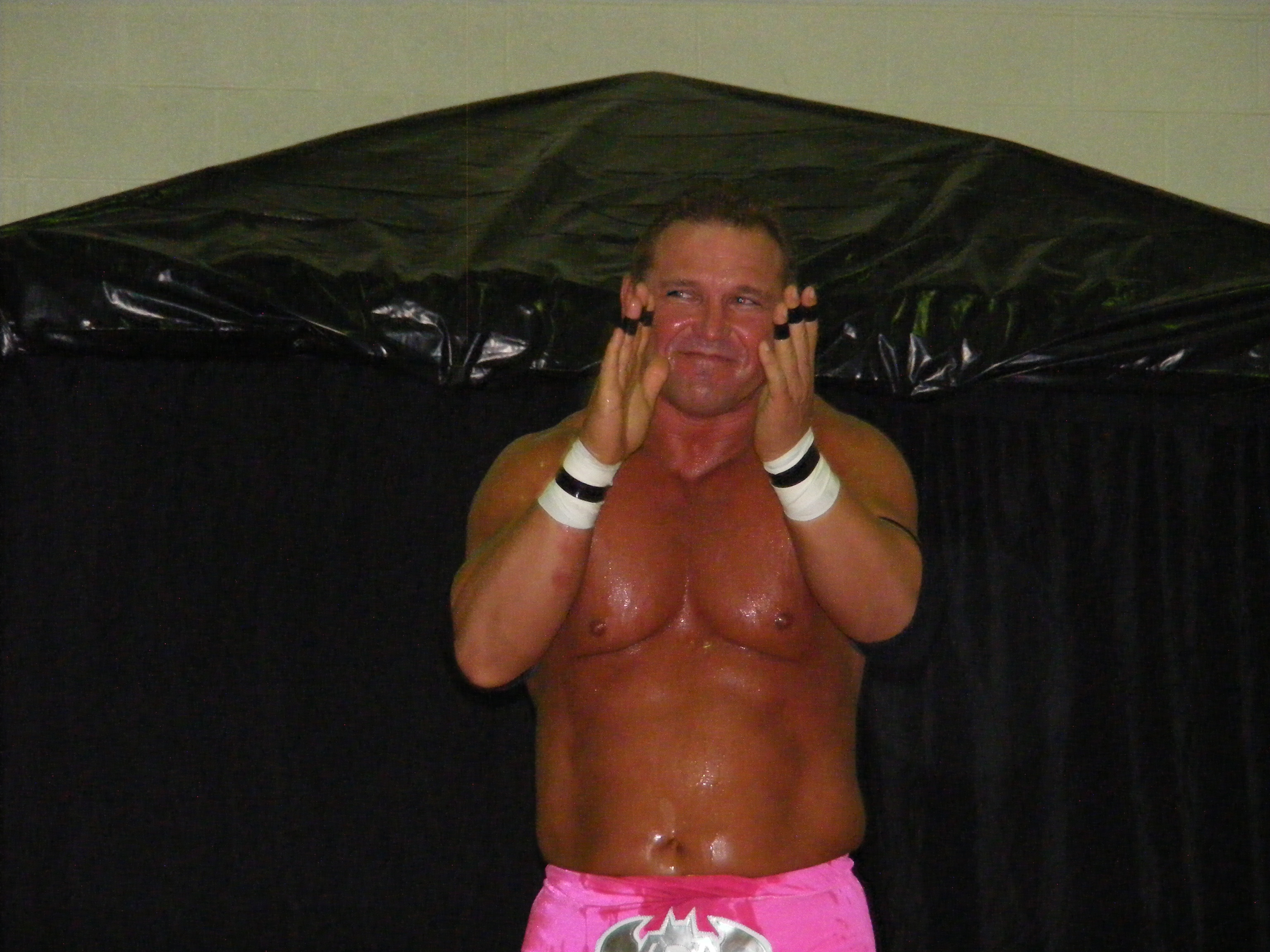
Storm in 2012

On May 1, 2011, Storm competed in a semi-final match at the Inaugural Germanfest Wringenmiesterschaft Tournament for the Indy World Championship. He won his semi-final match against Jason Jones before going on to face Jeremy Young. Finally, Storm defeated Kahagas in the final tournament match, winning the Indy World Championship.

On June 11, Storm won the NWA Oklahoma Heavyweight Championship from Michael Faith. He challenged unsuccessfully for the NWA Houston Heavyweight Championship against the champion Scot Summers on July 8 at NWA Houston Independence Explosion III.

In 2012, Storm worked in events involving Texas Stampede Wrestling beginning on January 28, at TSW One More Time in a successful tag team match with Apocalypse against the International Playa's Club (C-Diddy and Jared Steele). He wrestled again at TSW Spring Fling on March 31 against Mike Foxx and Action Jackson in a losing triple threat match. On April 14, Storm wrestled at TSW Knuckle Up against Mike Foxx in a (special referee Action Jackson) GWT Indy World Title match, winning against Foxx by DQ. At that same event he defeated Boink the Clown in a consecutive title defense. On June 16, at TSW Tru-Life Playaz Ball, Storm wrestled and loss to Bobby Lambert.

Storm went on to win the NWA Mid-South Heavyweight title from Gaylon Summers by forfeit on May 2, 2015, (as noted above), but that reign was short-lived as Rob Conway defeated Storm for the title on June 20, 2015, in Dyersburg.

In August 2019, Storm defeated Rodney Mack to become the inaugural SWE Heavyweight Champion. Storm would hold the title for over 500 days before losing it to Charlie Haas in February 2021. Following this, Storm would quit SWE over a money dispute with the company.

=== National Wrestling Alliance (2014-present) ===
==== North American Heavyweight Champion (2014–2015) ====
On October 27, 2014, Storm defeated NWA North American Champion Byron Wilcott to win the title at an NWA Main Event Wrestling show in Sherman, Texas. He defended the title for six months before dropping it to NWA National Heavyweight Champion Jax Dane in a title vs. title match on April 12, 2015, in Las Vegas, Nevada.

On July 17, 2015, in Sherman, Texas, Storm regained the NWA North American title when he defeated Andy Anderson in a tournament final for the title, which had been vacated on May 28 when previous champion Dane was injured. On July 16, 2016, in Pavo, Georgia, Storm's second North American title reign ended when Tyson Dean defeated him for the belt.

==== NWA World Heavyweight Champion (2016–2018) ====
While competing in NWA Texoma Wrestling, Storm defeated Jax Dane in Sherman, Texas on October 21, 2016, to become the National Wrestling Alliance (NWA) World Heavyweight Champion. At 51 years old, Storm made history as the oldest wrestler to ever win the title. On September 9, 2017, at Wrestle Raise III "Abbymania" in Hot Springs Arkansas, Storm successfully defended the NWA Heavyweight Championship against Jerry "The King" Lawler. On October 8, 2017, Storm appeared on Championship Wrestling from Hollywood with the historic ten pounds of gold. He gave an impassioned speech about the history and the importance of the NWA and its championship. He concluded by stating "This is my mountaintop. This is the pinnacle of the most important thing I have done in wrestling, and I will never-ever let this go-and that-is a fact!" The NWA subsequently began uploading videos to YouTube in a series titled "Ten Pounds of Gold" that chronicled the history of the NWA and Storm's career. Storm successfully defended the NWA World Heavyweight Championship against Nick Aldis on November 12, 2017, at a Championship Wrestling from Hollywood event in Los Angeles, California. On November 17, 2017, Storm successfully defended the NWA World Heavyweight Championship against Jocephus Brody, at a Tried-N-True Pro Wrestling event, in Clarksville, Tennessee. He lost the title to Nick Aldis on December 9, 2017.

Storm feuded with Jocephus Brody throughout 2018, as Jocephus had arguably cost Storm the championship due to injuring him (in a post-match attack following Jocephus' second consecutive loss to Storm). Their feud included an empty arena match with Storm's championship rematch at stake, as well as a hair-vs-hair tag team match.

==== Feud with Strictly Business and Baron Von Storm (2019–present) ====
On October 8, 2019 on the debut episode of NWA Powerrr, Nick Aldis granted Storm a rematch for the World Heavyweight title, with the stipulation that if Storm lost, he could never challenge for the title again. However, Aldis cleanly beat Storm to retain the NWA World Heavyweight Championship. Two weeks later, Storm teamed with Eli Drake in a losing effort against The Dawsons.

In 2022 and 2023, Storm primarily operated as an announcer for the NWA. At night 1 of the NWA 75th Anniversary Show, Storm returned to in-ring competition in a losing effort to Jax Dane.

In July 2024, Storm debuted a new gimmick, which saw him adopt the mannerisms of Baron von Raschke, including adopting the clawhold as his finisher and being billed as "Baron von Storm". He had his first match as Baron Von Storm on July 10 on NWA Powerrr, winning over Big Strong Mims via submission.

== Personal life ==
Outside professional wrestling, Storm is a junior high school history teacher in Euless Junior High in Euless, Texas.

== Championships and accomplishments ==
- Christian Wrestling Federation
  - CWF Heavyweight Championship (1 time)
  - CWF Tag Team Championship (2 times) - with Cowboy Adam
- Elite Championship Wrestling
  - NWA Elite Tag Team Championship (1 time) - with Matt Riviera
- Inspire Pro Wrestling
  - Twin Dragon Connection Championship (1 time) – with Davey Vega
  - Twin Dragon Connection Title Tournament (2015) – with Davey Vega
- Lone Star Pro Wrestling
  - Lone Star Heavyweight Championship (1 time)
- National Wrestling Alliance
  - NWA World Heavyweight Championship (1 time)
  - NWA North American Heavyweight Championship (2 times)
- National Wrestling Alliance Texoma
  - NWA Texoma Tag Team Championship (1 time) - with Apocalypse
- New Millenium Wrestling
  - NMW Tag Team Championship (1 time) - with Apocalypse
- NWA Mid-South
  - NWA Mid-South Unified Heavyweight Championship (1 time)
- NWA Oklahoma
  - NWA Oklahoma Heavyweight Championship (1 time)
- North American Wrestling Allegiance
  - NAWA Tag Team Championship (2 times) - with Cowboy Adam
- Professional Championship Wrestling
  - PCW Heavyweight Championship (1 time)
  - PCW Tag Team Championship (5 times) - with Apocalypse (3), The Faithful and Mace Malone (1), The Faithful and James Johnson (1)
- Pro Wrestling Illustrated
  - PWI ranked him No. 159 of the 500 best singles wrestlers of the PWI 500 in 2017
- Southwest Wrestling Entertainment
  - SWE Heavyweight Championship (1 time)
- Texoma Pride Wrestling
  - NWA Texoma Heavyweight Championship (2 times)
  - Texoma Pro Oklahoma Championship (1 time)
- Traditional Championship Wrestling
  - TCW Heavyweight Championship (4 times)
  - TCW Tag Team Championship (1 time) – with Matt Riviera
- Superstars Wars Wrestling
  - Superstars Wars Heavyweight Championship (1 times)
- VIP Wrestling
  - VIP Tag Team Championship (1 time) - with Apoc
- Xtreme Championship Wrestling
  - XCW Tag Team Championship (1 time) - with Apocalypse
- Other Titles
  - Indy World Championship (1 time, inaugural)
  - Indy World Title Tournament (2011)
