= Crockett Cup (2023) =

National Wrestling Alliance professional wrestling show

- Promotional poster
- Promotion: National Wrestling Alliance
- Date: June 3–4, 2023
- City: Winston-Salem, North Carolina
- Venue: Winston-Salem Fairgrounds Annex
- Attendance: 400-500

Event chronology
← Previous; NWA 312	Next → NWA 75th Anniversary Show

Crockett Cup chronology
← Previous; 2022	Next → 2024

The 2023 iteration of the Crockett Cup (formerly known as the Sixth Annual Jim Crockett Sr. Memorial Cup Tag Team Tournament) was a two-day professional wrestling tag team tournament produced by the National Wrestling Alliance (NWA). The event took place on June 3 and 4, 2023, at the Winston-Salem Fairgrounds Annex in Winston-Salem, North Carolina in the United States. It was the sixth iteration of the Crockett Cup.

== Production ==
=== Background ===
Other on-screen personnel
Role:	Name:
Commentators	Joe Galli
Commentators	Tim Storm
Commentators	Velvet Sky
Ring announcer	Kyle Davis

The Jim Crockett Sr. Memorial Cup Tag Team Tournament is a tag team tournament first held in April 1986. National Wrestling Alliance (NWA) member Jim Crockett Promotions (JCP), headed by Jim Crockett Jr., hosted the Crockett Cup, held in honor of Crockett's father, JCP founder Jim Crockett Sr. and saw participation of teams from various NWA territories. JCP held the tournament again in 1987 and 1988, before JCP was sold to Ted Turner later that year. In July 2017, the Crockett Foundation, with Classic Pro Wrestling, held the "Crockett Foundation Cup Tag Team Tournament" in New Kent, Virginia, which was not affiliated with the NWA. Bobby Fulton, The Barbarian, and The Rock 'n' Roll Express, all former Crockett Cup participants, took part in the event as a link to the original tournaments.

The original concept of the Crockett Cup was a single elimination tag team tournament, with the storyline prize of $1,000,000.00 given to the winning team along with a large trophy. The 1986 and 1987 tournaments featured 24 teams, while the 1988 version had 22 teams competing. Each tournament was split over two shows to encompass all 23 tournament matches as well as non-tournament matches; in 1986, JCP held a show in the afternoon and another in the evening, while the 1987 and 1988, the tournament was spread out over two days instead.

On April 7, 2023, at NWA 312, it was announced that the Crockett Cup would return and would be held in on June 3–4, at the Winston-Salem Fairgrounds Annex in Winston-Salem, North Carolina.

=== Storylines ===
The event will feature a number professional wrestling matches with different wrestlers involved in pre-existing scripted feuds, plots, and storylines. Wrestlers are portrayed as either heels (those that portray the "bad guys"), faces (the "good guy" characters), or tweeners (characters that are neither clearly a heel or a face) as they follow a series of tension-building events, which culminate in a wrestling match or series of matches as determined by the promotion. The thirteenth season of the NWA's weekly flagship program, Powerr, will feature storylines leading up to the event along with the seventh season of NWA USA.

==== Tournament matches ====
The main feature of the event is the titular Crockett Cup, a tag team tournament where, in addition to the namesake trophy, the winners will earn a match for the NWA World Tag Team Championship. 27 teams will be involved in the tournament.

The following twenty three teams have been announced or have qualified for the tournament:

- The Midnight Riders (NWA Worlds Heavyweight Champion Tyrus and Chris Adonis)
- The Mortons (Ricky Morton and NWA Junior Heavyweight Champion Kerry Morton)
- Magnum Muscle (Dak Draper and Mims)
- SVGS (Blake Troop and Jax Dane)
- Mike Knox and Trevor Murdoch
- The Country Gentlemen (AJ Cazana and Anthony Andrews) (NWA United States Tag Team Champions)
- The Spectaculars (Brady Pierce and Rush Freeman)
- The Warriors from the Wasteland (Judais and Max the Impaler)
- La Rebelión (Bestia 666 and Mecha Wolf) (NWA World Tag Team Champions)
- Jinetes del Aire (Myzteziz Jr. and Octagón Jr.) (Lucha Libre AAA Worldwide)
- Los Vipers (Arez and Toxin) (Lucha Libre AAA Worldwide)
- A Cut Above (NWA World Television Champion Thom Latimer and Rhett Titus)
- The Brothers of Funstruction (Yabo the Clown and Ruffo the Clown)
- The Fixers (Jay Bradley and Wrecking Ball Legursky)
- The Heatseekers (Elliot Russell and Matt Sigmon)
- Blunt Force Trauma (Carnage and Damage)
- Flippin' Psychos (Flip Gordon and Fodder)
- The Immortals (Kratos and Odinson)
- Idolmania Sports Management (Cyon and Jordan Clearwater)
- TNT (Terrell Hughes and Terrence Hughes)
- "Magic" Jake Dumas and Brian Brock

Seeding was announced during a May 18th special YouTube show where it was also announced that the 24th seed would be determined in a four-way tag team match between the following teams:

- The Miserably Faithful (Sal Vation and Gaagz the Gymp)
- Daisy Kill and Talos
- Jeremiah Plunkett and Eric Jackson
- The Outrunners (Turbo Floyd and Truth Magnum)

==== Other matches ====
At NWA 312, EC3 defeated Cyon to win the NWA National Heavyweight Championship. Later in the night, "Thrillbilly" Silas Mason won the Bob Luce Memorial Battle Royal to earn a match for the championship on Night 1 of the Crockett Cup.

During the May 15th episode of "This is the NWA" podcast/YouTube show, it was announced that on night one of Crockett Cup that a women's hardcore team war match would happen pitting all 4 members of Pretty Enpowered (Ella Envy, Roxy, Kenzie and Kylie Paige) against the team of Samantha Starr, La Rosa Negra, and the NWA Women's World Tag Team Champions M95 (Madi Wrenkowski and Missa Kate). Also, it was announced that on night two, Kenzie would defend the NWA World Women's Television Championship and that the new championship belt would be unveiled before the match.

== Results ==
Night 1
No.	Results	Stipulations	Times
1^{D}	Magnum Muscle (Dak Draper and Mims) defeated The Spectaculars (Brady Pierce and Rush Freeman) (with Rolando Freeman) by pinfall	Crockett Cup first round match	—
2^{D}	The Outrunners (Turbo Floyd and Truth Magnum) defeated Daisy Kill and Talos, Eric Jackson and Jeremiah Plunkett (with Danny Dealz), and The Miserably Faithful (Sal the Pal and Gaagz the Gymp) by pinfall	Four-way tag team elimination match Play-In Match to determine the 24 seed in the Crockett Cup tournament.	—
3^{D}	The Warriors from the Wasteland (Judais and Max the Impaler) (with Father James Mitchell) defeated The NOW (Hale Collins and Vik Dalishus) by pinfall	Crockett Cup first round match	—
4^{P}	Flippin' Psychos (Flip Gordon and Fodder) (with Angelina Love) defeated Sent2Slaughter (Dan Maff and Shawn Donavan) by pinfall	Crockett Cup first round match	7:16
5^{P}	SVGS (Jax Dane and Blake "Bulletproof" Troop) (with Chris Silvio, Esq.) defeated TNT (Terrell Hughes and Terrence Hughes) by submission	Crockett Cup first round match	6:37
6^{P}	The Brothers of Funstruction (Yabo the Clown and Ruffo the Clown) defeated The Fixers (Jay Bradley and Wrecking Ball Legursky) by pinfall	Crockett Cup first round match	6:59
7^{P}	Los Vipers (Arez and Toxin) defeated The Heatseekers (Elliot Russell and Matt Sigmon) by pinfall	Crockett Cup first round match	6:26
8^{P}	The Immortals (Kratos and Odinson) defeated Brian Brock and "Magic" Jake Dumas (with CJ) by pinfall	Crockett Cup first round match	4:24
9^{P}	The Outrunners (Turbo Floyd and Truth Magnum) defeated Idolmania Sports Management (Cyon and Jordan Clearwater) (with Austin Idol) by pinfall	Crockett Cup first round match	8:51
10	Blunt Force Trauma (Carnage and Damage) (with Aron Stevens) defeated The Outrunners (Turbo Floyd and Truth Magnum) by pinfall	Crockett Cup second round match	4:28
11	The Immortals (Kratos and Odinson) defeated The Country Gentlemen (AJ Cazana and Anthony Andrews) (with Joe Cazana) by pinfall	Crockett Cup second round match	7:57
12	Joe Alonzo (with Jamie Stanley) defeated Alex Taylor (with Danny Dealz) by submission	Singles match Winner advances to the six-way scramble match on Night 2.	7:47
13	The Mortons (Ricky Morton and Kerry Morton) defeated Los Vipers (Arez and Toxin) by pinfall	Crockett Cup second round match	7:21
14	The Brothers of Funstruction (Yabo the Clown and Ruffo the Clown) defeated A Cut Above (Thom Latimer and Rhett Titus) by pinfall	Crockett Cup second round match	9:27
15	Jinetes del Aire (Myzteziz Jr. and Octagón Jr.) defeated SVGS (Jax Dane and Blake "Bulletproof" Troop) (with Chris Silvio, Esq.) by pinfall	Crockett Cup second round match	5:46
16	Ruthie Jay, Samantha Starr, and M95 (Madi and Missa Kate) (with Baby Doll) defeated Pretty Empowered (Ella Envy, Kenzie Paige, Kylie Paige, and Roxy)	Hardcore Team War	14:05
17	Knox and Murdoch defeated Magnum Muscle (Dak Draper and Mims) by pinfall	Crockett Cup second round match	5:53
18	The Midnight Riders (Tyrus and Chris Adonis) defeated The Warriors from the Wasteland (Judais and Max the Impaler) (with Father James Mitchell) by disqualification	Crockett Cup second round match	9:31
19	EC3 (c) defeated "Thrillbilly" Silas Mason (with Pollo Del Mar) by pinfall	Singles match for the NWA National Heavyweight Championship	12:56
20	La Rebelión (Bestia 666 and Mecha Wolf) defeated Flippin' Psychos (Flip Gordon and Fodder) (with Angelina Love) by pinfall	Crockett Cup second round match	11:45
(c) / – the champion(s) heading into the match; D / – this was a dark match; P / – the match was broadcast on the pre-show

Night 2
No.	Results	Stipulations	Times
1^{P}	The Country Gentlemen (AJ Cazana and Anthony Andrews) (c) (with Joe Cazana) won by last eliminating SVGS (Jax Dane and Blake "Bulletproof" Troop) (with Chris Silvio, Esq.)	Gauntlet match for the NWA United States Tag Team Championship	17:42
2^{P}	"Thrillbilly" Silas Mason (with Alex Taylor) defeated Dan Maff by pinfall	Singles match	5:42
3^{P}	M95 (Madi and Missa Kate) (c) defeated Angelina Love and Max the Impaler (with Father James Mitchell) by pinfall	Tag team match for the NWA World Women's Tag Team Championship	7:08
4^{P}	Ruthie Jay defeated Kenzie Paige (c) by disqualification	Singles match for the NWA World Women's Television Championship	5:02
5	Jinetes del Aire (Myzteziz Jr. and Octagón Jr.) defeated The Brothers of Funstruction (Yabo the Clown and Ruffo the Clown) by pinfall	Crockett Cup quarterfinal match	4:10
6	Knox and Murdoch defeated The Mortons (Ricky Morton and Kerry Morton) by pinfall	Crockett Cup quarterfinal match	5:03
7	The Midnight Riders (Tyrus and Chris Adonis) defeated The Immortals (Kratos and Odinson) by pinfall	Crockett Cup quarterfinal match	7:43
8	Blunt Force Trauma (Carnage and Damage) (with Aron Stevens) defeated La Rebelión (Bestia 666 and Mecha Wolf) (with Vampiro) by pinfall	Crockett Cup quarterfinal match	5:56
9	EC3 (c) defeated Thom Latimer by pinfall	Singles match for the NWA National Heavyweight Championship	11:37
10	Colby Corino (with Jamie Stanley) defeated Flip Gordon, Eric Jackson, Joe Alonzo, Gaagz the Gymp, Jarron Fulton, and PJ Hawx by pinfall	Seven-way Scramble to determine the #1 contender to the NWA World Junior Heavyweight Championship	10:52
11	Blunt Force Trauma (Carnage and Damage) (with Aron Stevens) defeated Jinetes del Aire (Myzteziz Jr. and Octagón Jr.) by pinfall	Crockett Cup semifinal match	6:00
12	Knox and Murdoch defeated The Midnight Riders (Tyrus and Chris Adonis) by pinfall	Crockett Cup semifinal match	7:53
13	The Masked Mystery Man defeated Cyon (with Austin Idol) by technical knockout	Unsanctioned match	8:05
14	Kamille (c) defeated Natalia Markova by pinfall	Singles match for the NWA World Women's Championship	12:54
15	Knox and Murdoch defeated Blunt Force Trauma (Carnage and Damage) (with Aron Stevens) by pinfall	Crockett Cup final	9:55
(c) / – the champion(s) heading into the match; P / – the match was broadcast on the pre-show

=== 2023 Crockett Cup tournament bracket ===
First round Night 1 (June 3)
16	Flippin' Psychos (Flip Gordon and Fodder)	Pin
17	Sent2Slaughter (Dan Maff and Shawn Donovan)	7:16
9	Idolmania Sports Management (Cyon and Jordan Clearwater)	8:51
24	The Outrunners (Turbo Floyd and Truth Magnum)	Pin
13	SVGS (Jax Dane and Black Troop)	Sub
20	TNT (Terrell Hughes and Terrence Hughes)	6:37
12	The Fixers (Jay Bradley and Wrecking Ball Legursky)	6:59
21	The Brothers of Funstruction (Yabo the Clown and Ruffo the Clown)	Pin
15	The Warriors from the Wasteland (Judais and Max the Impaler	Pin
18	The NOW (Hale Collins and Vik Dalishus)	-
10	The Immortals (Kratos and Odinson)	Pin
23	Brian Brock and "Magic" Jake Dumas	4:24
14	Magnum Muscle (Dak Draper and Mims)	Pin
19	The Spectaculars (Brady Pierce and Rush Freeman)	-
11	Los Vipers (AAA) (Arez and Toxin)	Pin
22	The Heatseekers (Elliot Russell and Matt Sigmon)	6:26

Round of 16; Night 1 (June 3)
1	La Rebelión (Bestia 666 and Mecha Wolf)	Pin
16	Flippin' Psychos (Flip Gordon and Fodder)	11:45
8	Blunt Force Trauma (Carnage and Damage)	Pin
24	The Outrunners (Turbo Floyd and Truth Magnum)	4:28
4	Jinetes del Aire (AAA) (Myzteziz Jr. and Octagón Jr.)	Pin
13	SVGS (Jax Dane and Black Troop)	5:46
5	A Cut Above; Thom Latimer and Rhett Titus)	9:27
21	The Brothers of Funstruction (Yabo the Clown and Ruffo the Clown)	Pin
2	The Midnight Riders (Tyrus and Chris Adonis)	DQ
15	The Warriors from the Wasteland (Judais and Max the Impaler	9:31
7	The Country Gentlemen (AJ Cazana and Anthony Andrews)	7:57
10	The Immortals (Kratos and Odinson)	Pin
3	Knox and Murdoch	Pin
14	Magnum Muscle (Dak Draper and Mims)	5:53
6	The Mortons (Ricky Morton and Kerry Morton)	Pin
11	Los Vipers (AAA) (Arez and Toxin)	7:21

Quarterfinals; Night 2 (June 4)
1	La Rebelión	5:56
8	Blunt Force Trauma	Pin
4	Jinetes del Aire	Pin
21	The Brothers of Funstruction	4:10
2	The Midnight Riders	Pin
10	The Immortals	7:43
3	Knox and Murdoch	Pin
6	The Mortons	5:03

Semifinals; Night 2 (June 4)
8	Blunt Force Trauma	Pin
4	Jinetes del Aire	6:00
2	The Midnight Riders	7:53
3	Knox and Murdoch	Pin

Finals; Night 2 (June 4)
8	Blunt Force Trauma	9:55
3	Knox and Murdoch	Pin

=== Hardcore Team War match ===
Eliminated	Wrestler	Eliminated by	Method	Team
1	Missa Kate	Roxy	Pinned after a Codebreaker	Team Jay, Starr and M95
2	Roxy	Madi	Pinned after the Reality Check	Team Pretty Empowered
3	Kylie Page	Madi	Submitted after being locked in a hockey stick-assisted camel clutch	Team Pretty Empowered
4	Madi	Kenzie Paige	Pinned after Paige hit a cookie tray on her head	Team Jay, Starr and M95
5	Ruthie Jay	Kenzie Paige	Pinned with a schoolgirl	Team Jay, Starr and M95
6	Kenzie Paige	Samantha Starr	Eliminated after being thrown over the top rope	Team Pretty Empowered
7	Ella Envy	Samantha Starr	Pinned after being knocked out with a coal miner's glove	Team Pretty Empowered
Winner	Samantha Starr	N/A		Team Jay, Starr and M95

=== NWA United States Tag Team Championship gauntlet match ===
Eliminated	Team	Entered	Eliminated by	Method	Time
1	The NOW (Hale Collins and Vik Dalishus)	2	Magnum Muscle	Pinfall	2:22
2	The Fixers (Jay Bradley and Wrecking Ball Legursky)	3	Magnum Muscle	Pinfall	4:51
3	Magnum Muscle (Dak Draper and Mims)	1	Daisy Kill and Talos	Pinfall	7:08
4	Daisy Kill and Talos	4	TNT	Pinfall	9:05
5	TNT (Terrell Hughes and Terrence Hughes)	5	The Spectaculars	Pinfall	11:03
6	The Spectaculars (Brady Pierce and Rolando Freeman)	6	SVGS	Pinfall	13:05
7	Los Vipers (Arez and Toxin)	8	SVGS	Pinfall	14:52
8	SVGS (Jax Dane and Blake "Bulletproof" Troop)	7	The Country Gentlemen	Pinfall	17:42
Winner	The Country Gentlemen (AJ Cazana and Anthony Andrews) (c)	9	—N/a		17:42
