= List of NWA USA episodes =

This is a list of episodes for NWA USA, a weekly professional wrestling series produced by the National Wrestling Alliance (NWA). Each season focuses on storylines leading into the NWA's pay-per-view events.

== Series overview ==
Season	Episodes	Originally released	
Season	Episodes	First released	Last released
1	10	January 8, 2022	March 12, 2022
2	11	March 23, 2022	June 4, 2022
3	10	June 18, 2022	August 20, 2022
4	10	September 3, 2022	November 5, 2022
5	6	November 19, 2022	February 4, 2023
6	7	February 18, 2023	April 1, 2023
7	4	April 15, 2023	May 6, 2023

== List of NWA USA episodes ==
=== Season 1: Crockett Cup 2022 ===
No. overall	No. in season	Title	Taped date Location	Results	Stipulations	Original release date
1	S1E1	"Premiere"	December 3, 2021; Atlanta, GA	Colby Corino defeated CW Anderson (with George South) by pinfall	NWA World Junior Heavyweight Championship tournament quarter final match	January 8, 2022
1	S1E1	"Premiere"	December 3, 2021; Atlanta, GA	Luke Hawx defeated PJ Hawx by pinfall	NWA World Junior Heavyweight Championship tournament quarter final match	January 8, 2022
2	S1E2	"Season 1, Episode 2"	December 3, 2021; Atlanta, GA	Ariya Daivari defeated J Spade by pinfall	NWA World Junior Heavyweight Championship tournament quarter final match	January 15, 2022
2	S1E2	"Season 1, Episode 2"	December 3, 2021; Atlanta, GA	Marshe Rockett (with BLK Jeez) defeated Anthony Mayweather by pinfall	Singles match	January 15, 2022
3	S1E3	"Season 1, Episode 3"	December 3, 2021; Atlanta, GA	Natalia Markova vs. Kenzie Paige ended in a no contest	Singles match	January 22, 2022
3	S1E3	"Season 1, Episode 3"	December 3, 2021; Atlanta, GA	Kerry Morton (with Ricky Morton) defeated Jamie Stanley by pinfall	NWA World Junior Heavyweight Championship tournament quarter final match	January 22, 2022
3	S1E3	"Season 1, Episode 3"	December 3, 2021; Atlanta, GA	Wrecking Ball Legursky (with Jay Bradley) defeated George South (with CW Anderson) by pinfall	Empty Arena match	January 22, 2022
4	S1E4	"Season 1, Episode 4"	December 3, 2021; Atlanta, GA	Darius Lockhart defeated Sal Rinauro (with Danny Deals) by pinfall	NWA World Junior Heavyweight Championship tournament quarter final match	January 29, 2022
4	S1E4	"Season 1, Episode 4"	December 3, 2021; Atlanta, GA	The British Invasion (Doug Williams and Nick Aldis) defeated Strictly Business (Chris Adonis and Thom Latimer) by pinfall	Tag team match	January 29, 2022
5	S1E5	"Season 1, Episode 5"	December 3, 2021; Atlanta, GA	Darius Lockhart defeated Ariya Daivari by pinfall	NWA World Junior Heavyweight Championship tournament semifinal match	February 5, 2022
5	S1E5	"Season 1, Episode 5"	December 3, 2021; Atlanta, GA	Marshe Rockett (with BLK Jeez) defeated Miguel Robles by pinfall	Singles match	February 5, 2022
5	S1E5	"Season 1, Episode 5"	December 3, 2021; Atlanta, GA	Austin Aries defeated Luke Hawx (with PJ Hawx) by pinfall	NWA World Junior Heavyweight Championship tournament semifinal match	February 5, 2022
6	S1E6	"Season 1, Episode 6"	December 3, 2021; Atlanta, GA	Colby Corino (with Jay Bradley and Wrecking Ball Legursky) defeated Kerry Morton (with Ricky Morton) by pinfall	NWA World Junior Heavyweight Championship tournament semifinal match	February 12, 2022
6	S1E6	"Season 1, Episode 6"	December 3, 2021; Atlanta, GA	Natalia Markova defeated Kenzie Paige by pinfall	Singles match Tim Storm and Kamille present at ringside	February 12, 2022
7	S1E7	"Season 1, Episode 7"	December 3, 2021; Atlanta, GA	J Spade defeated CW Anderson (with George South), Jamie Stanley, and Sal Rinauro (with Danny Deals) by pinfall	Four-way match Winner earns an NWA World Junior Heavyweight Championship match	February 19, 2022
7	S1E7	"Season 1, Episode 7"	December 3, 2021; Atlanta, GA	Chris Adonis defeated Fable Jake via submission	Singles match	February 19, 2022
7	S1E7	"Season 1, Episode 7"	December 3, 2021; Atlanta, GA	Chris Adonis defeated Marshe Rockett (with BLK Jeez) via submission	Singles match If Rockett wins, he earns an NWA National Championship match at Crockett Cup	February 19, 2022
8	S1E8	"Season 1, Episode 8"	December 3, 2021; Atlanta, GA	Homicide defeated Alex Taylor by pinfall	Singles match	February 26, 2022
8	S1E8	"Season 1, Episode 8"	December 3, 2021; Atlanta, GA	Doug Williams defeated Jay Bradley (with Wrecking Ball Legursky) by pinfall	Singles match	February 26, 2022
9	S1E9	"Season 1, Episode 9"	December 3, 2021; Atlanta, GA	Natalia Markova defeated May Valentine via disqualification	Singles match	March 5, 2022
9	S1E9	"Season 1, Episode 9"	December 3, 2021; Atlanta, GA	Natalia Markova defeated Kamille via disqualification	Singles match	March 5, 2022
9	S1E9	"Season 1, Episode 9"	December 3, 2021; Atlanta, GA	Austin Aries defeated Ricky Morton (with Kerry Morton) by pinfall	Singles match	March 5, 2022
10	S1E10	"Season 1, Episode 10"	N/A; Atlanta, GA & Oak Grove, KY	Miguel Robles defeated De'Vin Graves by pinfall	Singles match	March 12, 2022
10	S1E10	"Season 1, Episode 10"	N/A; Atlanta, GA & Oak Grove, KY	Magic Jake Dumas defeated AJ Cazana by pinfall	Singles match	March 12, 2022
10	S1E10	"Season 1, Episode 10"	N/A; Atlanta, GA & Oak Grove, KY	Matthew Mims defeated Diante by pinfall	Singles match	March 12, 2022

=== Season 2: Alwayz Ready ===
No. overall	No. in season	Title	Taped date Location	Results	Stipulations	Original release date
11	S2E1	"Season 2, Episode 1"	March 23, 2022; Nashville, TN	Homicide (c) defeated Doug Williams by pinfall	Singles match for the NWA World Junior Heavyweight Championship	March 26, 2022
11	S2E1	"Season 2, Episode 1"	March 23, 2022; Nashville, TN	Kerry Morton defeated Gustavo Aguilar by pinfall	Singles match	March 26, 2022
11	S2E1	"Season 2, Episode 1"	March 23, 2022; Nashville, TN	Jay Bradley vs. Marshe Rockett (with BLK Jeez) ended in a double disqualification	Singles match to determine the #1 contender to the NWA National Championship	March 26, 2022
12	S2E2	"Season 2, Episode 2"	March 23, 2022; Nashville, TN	Caprice Coleman defeated Alex Taylor (with Danny Deals) by pinfall	Singles match	April 2, 2022
12	S2E2	"Season 2, Episode 2"	March 23, 2022; Nashville, TN	Natalia Markova defeated Riley by pinfall	Singles match	April 2, 2022
12	S2E2	"Season 2, Episode 2"	March 23, 2022; Nashville, TN	Matthew Mims vs. AJ Cazana ended in a time limit draw	Singles match	April 2, 2022
13	S2E3	"Season 2, Episode 3"	March 23, 2022; Nashville, TN	Colby Corino defeated Mike Jackson by pinfall	Singles match	April 9, 2022
13	S2E3	"Season 2, Episode 3"	March 23, 2022; Nashville, TN	Ariya Daivari defeated Sal Rinauro by pinfall	Singles match	April 9, 2022
13	S2E3	"Season 2, Episode 3"	March 23, 2022; Nashville, TN	Jax Dane and Marshe Rockett (with BLK Jeez) defeated The Fixers (Jay Bradley and Wrecking Ball Legursky) by pinfall	Tag team match Since Rockett got the fall, he earned an NWA National Championship match	April 9, 2022
14	S2E4	"Season 2, Episode 4"	March 23, 2022; Nashville, TN	Magic Jake Dumas defeated Eric Jackson by pinfall	Singles match	April 16, 2022
14	S2E4	"Season 2, Episode 4"	March 23, 2022; Nashville, TN	Nick Aldis defeated Ariya Daivari via submission	Singles match	April 16, 2022
15	S2E5	"PowerrrSurge USA, Presented by The Fixers"	March 23, 2022; Nashville, TN	VSK defeated Alex Taylor by pinfall	Singles match	April 23, 2022
15	S2E5	"PowerrrSurge USA, Presented by The Fixers"	March 23, 2022; Nashville, TN	Angelina Love defeated Riley by pinfall	Singles match	April 23, 2022
15	S2E5	"PowerrrSurge USA, Presented by The Fixers"	March 23, 2022; Nashville, TN	Rush Freeman defeated Garrisaon Creed by pinfall	Singles match	April 23, 2022
16	S2E6	"Season 2, Episode 6"	March 23, 2022; Nashville, TN	Kamille defeated Kaitlyn Alexis by pinfall	Singles match	April 30, 2022
16	S2E6	"Season 2, Episode 6"	March 23, 2022; Nashville, TN	Gaagz The Gymp defeated Jamie Stanley and KC Roxx by pinfall	Three-way match	April 30, 2022
16	S2E6	"Season 2, Episode 6"	March 23, 2022; Nashville, TN	Jax Dane (c) defeated Marshe Rockett by pinfall	Singles match for the NWA National Championship	April 30, 2022
17	S2E7	"Season 2, Episode 7"	March 23, 2022; Nashville, TN	Natalia Markova defeated Kenzie Paige by pinfall	Singles match	May 7, 2022
17	S2E7	"Season 2, Episode 7"	March 23, 2022; Nashville, TN	Wrecking Ball Legursky defeated Ricky Morton by pinfall	Singles match	May 7, 2022
18	S2E8	"Season 2, Episode 8"	March 23, 2022; Nashville, TN	Mike Bennett defeated Kerry Morton by pinfall	Singles match	May 14, 2022
18	S2E8	"Season 2, Episode 8"	March 23, 2022; Nashville, TN	Jennacide defeated MJ Jenkins by pinfall	Singles match	May 14, 2022
18	S2E8	"Season 2, Episode 8"	March 23, 2022; Nashville, TN	Colby Corino defeated Caprice Coleman by pinfall	Singles match	May 14, 2022
19	S2E9	"Season 2, Episode 9"	March 23, 2022; Nashville, TN	Homicide (c) defeated BLK Jeez by pinfall	Singles match for the NWA World Junior Heavyweight Championship	May 21, 2022
19	S2E9	"Season 2, Episode 9"	March 23, 2022; Nashville, TN	Rodney Mack and Brett Buffshay defeated The Ill Begotten (Jeremiah Plunkett and Rush Freeman) via submission	Tag team match	May 21, 2022
19	S2E9	"Season 2, Episode 9"	March 23, 2022; Nashville, TN	Gaagz The Gymp defeated Sal The Pal via submission	Singles match	May 21, 2022
20	S2E10	"PowerrrTrip 2 - Part 2"	April 30, 2022; Oak Grove, KY	Jay Bradley defeated Brady Pierce by pinfall	Singles match	May 28, 2022
20	S2E10	"PowerrrTrip 2 - Part 2"	April 30, 2022; Oak Grove, KY	Matthew Mims defeated AJ Cazana by pinfall	Singles match	May 28, 2022
20	S2E10	"PowerrrTrip 2 - Part 2"	April 30, 2022; Oak Grove, KY	The Miserably Faithful (Judais and Sal The Pal) (with Father James Mitchell) defeated Jax Dane and Magic Jake Dumas by pinfall	Tag team match	May 28, 2022
21	S2E11	"PowerrrTrip 2 - Part 4"	April 30, 2022; Oak Grove, KY	Anthony Andrews defeated Gustavo Aguilar by pinfall	Singles match	June 4, 2022
21	S2E11	"PowerrrTrip 2 - Part 4"	April 30, 2022; Oak Grove, KY	The Ill Begotten (Alex Taylor and Jeremiah Plunkett) (with Danny Deals) defeated Ruff N' Ready (D'Vin Gaves and Diante) by pinfall	Tag team match	June 4, 2022
21	S2E11	"PowerrrTrip 2 - Part 4"	April 30, 2022; Oak Grove, KY	Gaagz The Gymp (with Father James Mitchell) defeated Magic Jake Dumas by pinfall	No Disqualification match	June 4, 2022

=== Season 3: NWA 74 ===
No. overall	No. in season	Title	Taped date Location	Results	Stipulations	Original release date
22	S3E1	"Knox Out - Part 2"	June 12, 2022; Knoxville, TN	Sam Shaw defeated Mercurio via submission	Singles match	June 18, 2022
22	S3E1	"Knox Out - Part 2"	June 12, 2022; Knoxville, TN	The Legends (Homicide, Ricky Morton, and Kerry Morton) defeated Colby Corino and The Fixers (Jay Bradley and Wrecking Ball Legursky) by pinfall	Six-man tag team match	June 18, 2022
23	S3E2	"Knox Out - Part 4"	June 12, 2022; Knoxville, TN	Luke Hawx defeated "Thrillbilly" Silas Mason (with Pollo Del Mar) by pinfall	Singles match	June 25, 2022
23	S3E2	"Knox Out - Part 4"	June 12, 2022; Knoxville, TN	Jax Dane (c) defeated Eric Jackson by pinfall	Singles match for the NWA National Championship	June 25, 2022
23	S3E2	"Knox Out - Part 4"	June 12, 2022; Knoxville, TN	N/A	N/A	June 25, 2022
24	S3E3	"Knox Out - Part 6"	June 12, 2022; Knoxville, TN	Gaagz The Gymp defeated BLK Jeez (with Austin Idol) by pinfall	Singles match	July 2, 2022
24	S3E3	"Knox Out - Part 6"	June 12, 2022; Knoxville, TN	"Magic" Jake Dumas (with Christi Jaynes) defeated AJ Cazana (with Joe Cazana) by pinfall	Singles match	July 2, 2022
24	S3E3	"Knox Out - Part 6"	June 12, 2022; Knoxville, TN	Pretty Empowered (Ella Envy and Kenzie Paige) (c) defeated The Hex (Allysin Kay and Marti Belle) by pinfall	Tag team match for the NWA World Women's Tag Team Championship	July 2, 2022
25	S3E4	"Season 3, Episode 4"	June 14, 2022; Nashville, TN	Jax Dane defeated Anthony Andrews by pinfall	Singles match	July 9, 2022
25	S3E4	"Season 3, Episode 4"	June 14, 2022; Nashville, TN	Jennacide defeated Angelina Love by countout	Singles match	July 9, 2022
25	S3E4	"Season 3, Episode 4"	June 14, 2022; Nashville, TN	Homicide (c) defeated VSK by pinfall	Singles match for the NWA World Junior Heavyweight Championship	July 9, 2022
26	S3E5	"Season 3, Episode 5"	June 14, 2022; Nashville, TN	Rhett Titus defeated Gustavo Aguilar and Matt Vine by pinfall	Three-way match	July 16, 2022
26	S3E5	"Season 3, Episode 5"	June 14, 2022; Nashville, TN	Colby Corino defeated Luke Hawx by pinfall	Singles match	July 16, 2022
27	S3E6	"Season 3, Episode 6"	June 14, 2022; Nashville, TN	Caprice Coleman defeated Joe Alonzo and Matt Vine by pinfall	Singles match	July 23, 2022
27	S3E6	"Season 3, Episode 6"	June 14, 2022; Nashville, TN	Mercurio defeated Jamie Stanley by pinfall	Singles match	July 23, 2022
27	S3E6	"Season 3, Episode 6"	June 14, 2022; Nashville, TN	Kerry Morton defeated Colby Corino by pinfall	Singles match	July 23, 2022
28	S3E7	"Surge USA, Presented by The Fixers"	June 14, 2022; Nashville, TN	Idolmania Sports Management (Cyon and Jordan Clearwater) (with Austin Idol) defeated The NOW (Hale Collins and Vik Dalishus) by pinfall	Tag team match	July 30, 2022
28	S3E7	"Surge USA, Presented by The Fixers"	June 14, 2022; Nashville, TN	Brady Pierce defeated Brett Buffshay by pinfall	Singles match	July 30, 2022
28	S3E7	"Surge USA, Presented by The Fixers"	June 14, 2022; Nashville, TN	Marti Belle defeated Missa Kate, Paola Blaze, and Rylee by pinfall	Four-way match	July 30, 2022
28	S3E7	"Surge USA, Presented by The Fixers"	June 14, 2022; Nashville, TN	The Miserably Faithul (Sal The Pal and Gaagz The Gymp) (with Judais) defeated The Ill Begotten (Alex Taylor and Rush Freeman) (with Jeremiah Plunkett) by pinfall	Tag team match	July 30, 2022
29	S3E8	"Season 3, Episode 8"	June 14, 2022; Nashville, TN	"Magic" Jake Dumas (with Christi Jaynes) defeated Brett Buffshay and "Thrillbilly" Silas Mason (with Pollo Del Mar) by pinfall	Handicap match	August 6, 2022
29	S3E8	"Season 3, Episode 8"	June 14, 2022; Nashville, TN	KC Roxx (with Aron Stevens) defeated Jamie Stanley by pinfall	Singles match	August 6, 2022
29	S3E8	"Season 3, Episode 8"	June 14, 2022; Nashville, TN	Homicide (c) defeated PJ Hawx by pinfall	Singles match for the NWA World Junior Heavyweight Championship	August 6, 2022
30	S3E9	"Season 3, Episode 9"	June 14, 2022; Nashville, TN	The Country Gentlemen (AJ Cazana and Anthony Andrews) defeated The NOW (Hale Collins & Vik Dalishus) by pinfall	Tag team match	August 13, 2022
30	S3E9	"Season 3, Episode 9"	June 14, 2022; Nashville, TN	Ricky Morton defeated VSK by pinfall	Singles match	August 13, 2022
31	S3E10	"Season 3, Episode 10"	June 14, 2022; Nashville, TN	Mercurio defeated Matt Vine by pinfall	Singles match	August 20, 2022
31	S3E10	"Season 3, Episode 10"	June 14, 2022; Nashville, TN	The Hex (Allysin Kay and Marti Belle) defeated Kaci Lennox & Missa Kate by pinfall	Tag team match	August 20, 2022

=== Season 4: Hard Times 3 ===
No. overall	No. in season	Title	Taped date Location	Results	Stipulations	Original release date
32	S4E1	"Season 4, Episode 1"	September 30, 2022; Nashville, TN	Colby Corino (with Jamie Stanley) defeated PJ Hawx, Gustavo Aguilar, and Joe Ocasio by pinfall	Four-way match	September 3, 2022
32	S4E1	"Season 4, Episode 1"	September 30, 2022; Nashville, TN	"Magic" Jake Dumas (with Christi Jaynes) defeated Luke Hawx by pinfall	NWA National Championship number one contender's tournament qualifying match	September 3, 2022
32	S4E1	"Season 4, Episode 1"	September 30, 2022; Nashville, TN	Dax Draper defeated Jax Dane (with Chris Silvio, Esq.) by disqualification	NWA National Championship number one contender's tournament qualifying match	September 3, 2022
33	S4E2	"Season 4, Episode 2"	September 30, 2022; Nashville, TN	Homicide (c) defeated Eric Jackson by submission	Singles match for the NWA World Junior Heavyweight Championship	September 10, 2022
33	S4E2	"Season 4, Episode 2"	September 30, 2022; Nashville, TN	Judais (with Father James Mitchell) defeated Mercurio by pinfall	NWA National Championship number one contender's tournament qualifying match	September 10, 2022
33	S4E2	"Season 4, Episode 2"	September 30, 2022; Nashville, TN	Brian Myers defeated Mike Bennett by pinfall	NWA National Championship number one contender's tournament qualifying match	September 10, 2022
34	S4E3	"Season 4, Episode 3"	September 30, 2022; Nashville, TN	"Thrillbilly" Silas Mason (with Pollo Del Mar) defeated Anthony Mayweather by pinfall	NWA National Championship number one contender's tournament qualifying match	September 17, 2022
34	S4E3	"Season 4, Episode 3"	September 30, 2022; Nashville, TN	Kerry Morton (with Ricky Morton) defeated AJ Cazana (with Anthony Andrews) by pinfall	Singles match	September 17, 2022
34	S4E3	"Season 4, Episode 3"	September 30, 2022; Nashville, TN	Chris Adonis defeated Caprice Coleman by submission	NWA National Championship number one contender's tournament qualifying match	September 17, 2022
35	S4E4	"Season 4, Episode 4"	September 30, 2022; Nashville, TN	The Fixers (Jay Bradley and Wrecking Ball Legursky) (c) defeated Gold Rushhh (Marshe Rockett and Jordan Clearwater) (with BLK Jeez) by pinfall	Tag team match for the NWA United States Tag Team Championship	September 24, 2022
35	S4E4	"Season 4, Episode 4"	September 30, 2022; Nashville, TN	"Thrillbilly" Silas Mason (with Pollo Del Mar) defeated Judais (with Father James Mitchell) by pinfall	NWA National Championship number one contender's tournament semifinal	September 24, 2022
35	S4E4	"Season 4, Episode 4"	September 30, 2022; Nashville, TN	Kerry Morton defeated Peter Avalon, Joe Alonzo, Mike Bennett, PJ Hawx, and Colby Corino (with Jamie Stanley) by pinfall	Six-way scramble to determine the number one contender to the NWA World Junior Heavyweight Championship	September 24, 2022
36	S4E5	"Season 4, Episode 5"	September 30, 2022; Nashville, TN	AJ Cazana defeated Anthony Mayweather, Jax Dane, Marshe Rockett, and Ricky Morton by submission	NWA World Television Championship Contender's five-way elimination match	October 1, 2022
36	S4E5	"Season 4, Episode 5"	September 30, 2022; Nashville, TN	Bully Ray defeated Jamie Stanley by pinfall	Singles match	October 1, 2022
36	S4E5	"Season 4, Episode 5"	September 30, 2022; Nashville, TN	Jordan Clearwater defeated Caprice Coleman, Max The Impaler (with Father James Mitchell), The Pope, Rush Freeman by pinfall	NWA World Television Championship Contender's five-way elimination match	October 1, 2022
37	S4E6	"Surge USA"	September 30, 2022; Nashville, TN	The NOW (Hale Collins and Vik Dalishus) defeated Eric Jackson and Jaden Newman by pinfall	Tag team match	October 8, 2022
37	S4E6	"Surge USA"	September 30, 2022; Nashville, TN	The Country Gentleman (AJ Cazana and Anthony Andrews) defeated Rhett Titus and Gustavo Aguilar by pinfall	Tag team match	October 8, 2022
37	S4E6	"Surge USA"	September 30, 2022; Nashville, TN	Joe Ocasio defeated Fodder by pinfall	Singles match	October 8, 2022
37	S4E6	"Surge USA"	September 30, 2022; Nashville, TN	The Spectaculars (Brady Pierce and Rush Freeman) (with Rolando Freeman) defeated The Miserably Faithful (Sal The Pal and Gaagz The Gymp) by pinfall	Tag team match	October 8, 2022
38	S4E7	"Season 4, Episode 7"	September 31, 2022; Nashville, TN	Madi Wrenkowski and Missa Kate defeated Pretty Empowered (Ella Envy and Kenzie Paige) by pinfall	Tag team match	October 15, 2022
38	S4E7	"Season 4, Episode 7"	September 31, 2022; Nashville, TN	Homicide (c) defeated Doug Williams by referee stoppage	Singles match for the NWA World Junior Heavyweight Championship	October 15, 2022
38	S4E7	"Season 4, Episode 7"	September 31, 2022; Nashville, TN	The Fixers (Jay Bradley and Wrecking Ball Legursky) (with Matt Vine) defeated Mercurio and The Ill Begotten (Alex Taylor and Jeremiah Plunkett) (with Danny Dealz) by pinfall	Handicap match	October 15, 2022
39	S4E8	"Season 4, Episode 8"	September 31, 2022; Nashville, TN	La Rebelión (Bestia 666 and Mecha Wolf) (with Damián 666) defeated The Dirty Sexy Boys (Dirty Dango and JTG) by pinfall	Tag team match	October 22, 2022
39	S4E8	"Season 4, Episode 8"	September 31, 2022; Nashville, TN	Kenzie Paige defeated Ella Envy and Roxy by pinfall	Three-way match for Leadership of Pretty Empowered	October 22, 2022
39	S4E8	"Season 4, Episode 8"	September 31, 2022; Nashville, TN	Gaagz The Gymp (with Father James Mitchell) defeated Caprice Coleman by pinfall	Singles match	October 22, 2022
39	S4E8	"Season 4, Episode 8"	September 31, 2022; Nashville, TN	AJ Cazana vs. Jordan Clearwater ended in a time limit draw	Singles match for the vacant NWA World Television Championship	October 22, 2022
40	S4E9	"Season 4, Episode 9"	September 31, 2022; Nashville, TN	Max The Imapler (with Gaagz The Gymp) defeated Natalia Markova and Taryn Terrell by pinfall	Handicap match	October 29, 2022
40	S4E9	"Season 4, Episode 9"	September 31, 2022; Nashville, TN	Wrecking Ball Legursky and The Ill Begotten (Alex Taylor and Jeremiah Plunkett) (with Danny Dealz) defeated "Magic" Jake Dumas and The NOW (Hale Collins and Vik Dalishus) (with Christi Jaynes) by pinfall	Six-man tag team match	October 29, 2022
40	S4E9	"Season 4, Episode 9"	September 31, 2022; Nashville, TN	Kenzie Paige defeated Missa Kate by submission	Singles match	October 29, 2022
40	S4E9	"Season 4, Episode 9"	September 31, 2022; Nashville, TN	Jay Bradley defeated Ricky Morton by pinfall	Singles match	October 29, 2022
41	S4E10	"Surge USA, Presented by The Cardonas"	September 31, 2022; Nashville, TN	Homicide defeated Chris Sainz by pinfall	Singles match	November 5, 2022
41	S4E10	"Surge USA, Presented by The Cardonas"	September 31, 2022; Nashville, TN	Angelina Love defeated Ella Envy by pinfall	Singles match	November 5, 2022
41	S4E10	"Surge USA, Presented by The Cardonas"	September 31, 2022; Nashville, TN	La Rebelión (Bestia 666 and Mecha Wolf 450) (with Damián 666) defeated Hawx Aerie (Luke Hawx and PJ Hawx) by pinfall	Tag team match for the vacant NWA World Tag Team Championship	November 5, 2022

=== Season 5: Nuff Said ===
No. overall	No. in season	Title	Taped date Location	Results	Stipulations	Original release date
42	S5E1	"Revolution Rumble - Part 2"	November 13, 2022; Chalmette, LA	The Fixers (Jay Bradley and Wrecking Ball Legursky) (c) defeated The Country Gentlemen (AJ Cazana and Anthony Andrews) by pinfall	Tag team match for the NWA United States Tag Team Championship	November 19, 2022
42	S5E1	"Revolution Rumble - Part 2"	November 13, 2022; Chalmette, LA	Missa Kate defeated Madi Wrenkowski by pinfall	Singles match	November 19, 2022
42	S5E1	"Revolution Rumble - Part 2"	November 13, 2022; Chalmette, LA	Jace Valor defeated Homicide by disqualification	Singles match	November 19, 2022
43	S5E2	"Revolution Rumble - Part 4"	November 13, 2022; Chalmette, LA	JTG and The Pope defeated The Miserably Faithful (Judais and Gaagz the Gymp) (with Father James Mitchell and Sal the Pal) by pinfall	Tag team match	November 26, 2022
43	S5E2	"Revolution Rumble - Part 4"	November 13, 2022; Chalmette, LA	Natalia Markova defeated Ella Envy by pinfall	Singles match Kenzie Paige served as the special guest referee	November 26, 2022
43	S5E2	"Revolution Rumble - Part 4"	November 13, 2022; Chalmette, LA	Kerry Morton (c) (with Ricky Morton) defeated Colby Corino (with Homicide) by pinfall	Singles match for the NWA World Junior Heavyweight Championship	November 26, 2022
44	S5E3	"'evolution Rumble - Part 6"	November 13, 2022; Chalmette, LA	Rhett Titus won by last eliminating Odinson; The other participants were: Luke Hawx, PJ Hawx, Matthew Mims, Mercurio, Dak Draper, Sal the Pal, Jax Dane, Anthony Mayweather, Alex Taylor, Brady Pierce, David Powers, Eddie Vero, Danny Flamingo, Bu Ku Dao, J Spade, D'Vin Graves, Larry D, Sodapop Hendrix, Jace Valor, Gusatvo Aguilar, and Jennacide.	23-man Revolution Rumble for a future WildKat Revolution Championship match	December 3, 2022
45	S5E4	"The Champions Series - Part 2"	N/A; Nashville, TN	KiLynn King (Team Fixers) [8] defeated Angelina Love (Team Great) [7] by submission	Singles match, Champions Series First Round Match	December 10, 2022
45	S5E4	"The Champions Series - Part 2"	N/A; Nashville, TN	The Question Mark II (Team Brickhouse) [7] defeated Carnage (Team Tyrus) [8] by submission	Singles match, Champions Series First Round Match	December 10, 2022
45	S5E4	"The Champions Series - Part 2"	N/A; Nashville, TN	Missa Kate (Team Great) [9] defeated Marti Belle (Team Fixers) [8] by countout	Singles match, Champions Series First Round Match	December 10, 2022
45	S5E4	"The Champions Series - Part 2"	N/A; Nashville, TN	Madi Wrenkowski and Samantha Starr (Team Brickhouse) [8] defeated Allysin Kay and Kayla Kassidy (Team Tyrus) [8] by basic disqualification	Tag team match, Champions Series First Round Match	December 10, 2022
45	S5E4	"The Champions Series - Part 2"	N/A; Nashville, TN	Madi Wrenkowski and Samantha Starr (Team Brickhouse) [10] vs. Allysin Kay and Kayla Kassidy (Team Tyrus) [10] ended in a time limit draw	Tag team match, Champions Series First Round Match	December 10, 2022
45	S5E4	"The Champions Series - Part 2"	N/A; Nashville, TN	Rolando Freeman (Team Tyrus) [15] defeated Jeremiah Plunkett (Team Brickhouse) [10] by pinfall	Singles match, Champions Series First Round Match	December 10, 2022
46	S5E5	"The Champions Series - Part 4"	N/A; Nashville, TN	La Rosa Negra (Team Pretty) [8] defeated Taya Valkyrie (Team Rock n' Roll) [5] by extreme disqualification	Singles match, Champions Series First Round Match	December 17, 2022
46	S5E5	"The Champions Series - Part 4"	N/A; Nashville, TN	Mercurio (Team Gold) [8] defeated Joe Alonzo (Team Rebelión) [6] by pinfall	Singles match, Champions Series First Round Match	December 17, 2022
46	S5E5	"The Champions Series - Part 4"	N/A; Nashville, TN	Jannacide (Team Rock n' Roll) [10] defeated Ella Envy (Team Pretty) [8] by pinfall	Singles match, Champions Series First Round Match	December 17, 2022
46	S5E5	"The Champions Series - Part 4"	N/A; Nashville, TN	Max the Impaler and Ashley D'Amboise (Team Rebelión) [11] defeated Natalia Markova and Roxy (Team Gold) [8] by pinfall	Tag team match, Champions Series First Round Match	December 17, 2022
47	S5E6	"NWA Wrestling Christmas Special"	N/A; Nashville, TN	The Fixers (Jay Bradley and Wrecking Ball Legursky) defeated Alex Caytal and Shepard Lutz by pinfall	Tag team match	December 24, 2022
47	S5E6	"NWA Wrestling Christmas Special"	N/A; Nashville, TN	Eric Jackson defeated Sodapop Hendrix by pinfall	Singles match	December 24, 2022
47	S5E6	"NWA Wrestling Christmas Special"	N/A; Nashville, TN	The Country Gentlemen (AJ Cazana and Anthony Andrews) defeated The Spectaculars (Rush Freeman and Rolando Freeman) by pinfall	Tag team match	December 24, 2022
47	S5E6	"NWA Wrestling Christmas Special"	N/A; Nashville, TN	Rhett Titus defeated Gaagz the Gymp (with Father James Mitchell) by pinfall	Singles match	December 24, 2022
47	S5E6	"NWA Wrestling Christmas Special"	N/A; Nashville, TN	Pretty Empowered (Ella Envy and Roxy) defeated The Renegade Twins (Charlette Renegade and Robyn Renegade) by pinfall	Tag team match	December 24, 2022
47	S5E6	"NWA Wrestling Christmas Special"	N/A; Nashville, TN	J. R. Kratos defeated Blake "Bulletproof" Troop (with Chris Silvio, Esq.) by pinfall	Singles match	December 24, 2022
48	S5E7	"Season 5, Episode 7"	January 31, 2023; Knoxville, TN	Homicide defeated Ryan Davidson by pinfall	Singles match	February 4, 2023
48	S5E7	"Season 5, Episode 7"	January 31, 2023; Knoxville, TN	Psycho Love (Fodder and Angelina Love) defeated Mercurio and Natalia Markova by pinfall	Mixed tag team match	February 4, 2023
48	S5E7	"Season 5, Episode 7"	January 31, 2023; Knoxville, TN	Kerry Morton (with Ricky Morton) defeated Joe Alonzo by pinfall	Singles match	February 4, 2023

=== Season 6: NWA 312 ===
No. overall	No. in season	Title	Taped date Location	Results	Stipulations	Original release date
49	S6E1	"Season 6, Episode 1"	February 12, 2023; Tampa, FL	Taya Valkyrie defeated Jennacide by pinfall	NWA Women's Television Championship Tournament qualifying match	February 18, 2023
49	S6E1	"Season 6, Episode 1"	February 12, 2023; Tampa, FL	"Magic" Jake Dumas (with Christi Jaynes) defeated Mercurio by pinfall	Singles match	February 18, 2023
49	S6E1	"Season 6, Episode 1"	February 12, 2023; Tampa, FL	The Country Gentlemen (AJ Cazana and Anthony Andrews) (c) defeated The Spectaculars (Brady Pierce and Rush Freeman) (with Rolando Freeman) by pinfall	Tag team match for the NWA United States Tag Team Championship	February 18, 2023
50	S6E2	"Season 6, Episode 2"	February 12, 2023; Tampa, FL	Joe Alonzo (with Jamie Stanley) defeated PJ Hawx by pinfall	Singles match	February 25, 2023
50	S6E2	"Season 6, Episode 2"	February 12, 2023; Tampa, FL	Ashley D'Amboise defeated Samantha Starr by pinfall	NWA Women's Television Championship Tournament qualifying match	February 25, 2023
50	S6E2	"Season 6, Episode 2"	February 12, 2023; Tampa, FL	"Thrillbilly" Silas Mason (with Pollo Del Mar) defeated Judais (with Father James Mitchell) by pinfall	Singles match	February 25, 2023
51	S6E3	"Season 6, Episode 3"	February 12, 2023; Tampa, FL	Chris Adonis and Rhett Titus (with Bobby Fulton) defeated The Fixers (Jay Bradley and Wrecking Ball Legursky) by pinfall	Tag team match	March 4, 2023
51	S6E3	"Season 6, Episode 3"	February 12, 2023; Tampa, FL	Max the Impaler (with Father James Mitchell) defeated Natalia Markova by disqualification	NWA Women's Television Championship Tournament qualifying match	March 4, 2023
51	S6E3	"Season 6, Episode 3"	February 12, 2023; Tampa, FL	The SVGS (Jax Dane and Blake "Bulletproof" Troop) (with Chris Silvio, Esq.) defeated The Ill Begotten (Alex Taylor and Jeremiah Plunkett) (with Danny Dealz) by pinfall	Tag team match to determine the number one contenders to the NWA United States Tag Team Championship	March 4, 2023
52	S6E4	"Surge USA"	February 12, 2023; Tampa, FL	Pretty Empowered 2.0 (Ella Envy and Roxy) defeated Jacey Love and Ruthie Jay by pinfall	Tag team match	March 11, 2023
52	S6E4	"Surge USA"	February 12, 2023; Tampa, FL	Chico Adams and The Real Drago defeated Dirty South (Brian Brock & Devin Diaz) by pinfall	Tag team match	March 11, 2023
52	S6E4	"Surge USA"	February 12, 2023; Tampa, FL	Samantha Starr defeated The WOAD by pinfall	Singles match	March 11, 2023
52	S6E4	"Surge USA"	February 12, 2023; Tampa, FL	Daisy Kill defeated Rush Freeman (with Rolando Freeman) by pinfall	Singles match	March 11, 2023
53	S6E5	"Season 6, Episode 5"	February 13, 2023; Tampa, FL	Bobby Fulton vs. Wrecking Ball Legursky (with Jay Bradley) ended in a no contest	Non-sanctioned match	March 18, 2023
53	S6E5	"Season 6, Episode 5"	February 13, 2023; Tampa, FL	Blake "Bulletproof' Troop (with Chris Silvio, Esq.) defeated Jeremiah Plunkett (with Danny Dealz) by pinfall	Singles match	March 18, 2023
53	S6E5	"Season 6, Episode 5"	February 13, 2023; Tampa, FL	Natalia Markova defeated Christi Jaynes by pinfall	Singles match	March 18, 2023
54	S6E6	"Season 6, Episode 6"	February 13, 2023	Psycho Love (Fodder and Angelina Love) defeated PJ Hawx and Kylie Paige by pinfall	Intergender tag team match	March 25, 2023
54	S6E6	"Season 6, Episode 6"	February 13, 2023	Jax Dane defeated Shepard Lutz by pinfall	Singles match	March 25, 2023
54	S6E6	"Season 6, Episode 6"	February 13, 2023	The Country Gentlemen (AJ Cazana and Anthony Andrews) defeated The Miserably Faithful (Judais and Gaagz the Gymp) (with Father James Mitchell) by pinfall	Tag team match	March 25, 2023
55	S6E7	"Season 6, Episode 7"	February 13, 2023	La Rosa Negra, Madi Wrenkowski, and Missa Kate defeated Ruthie Jay and The Renegade Twins (Charlette Renegade and Robyn Renegade) by pinfall	Six-woman tag team match	April 1, 2023
55	S6E7	"Season 6, Episode 7"	February 13, 2023	Natalia Markova defeated Labrava Escobar by pinfall	Singles match	April 1, 2023
55	S6E7	"Season 6, Episode 7"	February 13, 2023	The Fixers (Jay Bradley and Wrecking Ball Legursky) defeated Porter and VHS by pinfall	Tag team match	April 1, 2023

=== Season 7: Crockett Cup 2023 ===
No. overall	No. in season	Title	Taped date Location	Results	Stipulations	Original release date
56	S7E1	"Season 7, Episode 1"	April 8, 2023; Highland Park, IL	Alex Taylor defeated Rhett Titus and Victor Iniestra by pinfall	Three-way match	April 15, 2023
56	S7E1	"Season 7, Episode 1"	April 8, 2023; Highland Park, IL	The Country Gentlemen (AJ Cazana and Anthony Andrews) defeated Billy Tipton and Garrisaon Creed by pinfall	Tag team match	April 15, 2023
56	S7E1	"Season 7, Episode 1"	April 8, 2023; Highland Park, IL	Max the Impaler (with Father James Mitchell) defeated Samantha Starr by pinfall	Singles match	April 15, 2023
57	S7E2	"Season 7, Episode 2"	April 8, 2023; Highland Park, IL	Labrava Escobar (with Christi Jaynes) defeated Celeste by pinfall	Singles match	April 22, 2023
57	S7E2	"Season 7, Episode 2"	April 8, 2023; Highland Park, IL	Jeremiah Plunkett defeated Salazar de la Muerte by pinfall	Singles match	April 22, 2023
57	S7E2	"Season 7, Episode 2"	April 8, 2023; Highland Park, IL	Magnum Muscle (Dak Draper and Matthew Mims) defeated The Fixers Nation (Matt Vine and The Fixer) by pinfall	2023 Crockett Cup Tournament Qualifying match	April 22, 2023
58	S7E3	"Season 7, Episode 3"	April 8, 2023; Highland Park, IL	Damage (with Aron Stevens) defeated Rush Freeman (with Rolando Freeman) by pinfall	Singles match	April 29, 2023
58	S7E3	"Season 7, Episode 3"	April 8, 2023; Highland Park, IL	Kylie Paige defeated Sierra by pinfall	Singles match	April 29, 2023
58	S7E3	"Season 7, Episode 3"	April 8, 2023; Highland Park, IL	"Magic" Jake Dumas (with Christi Jaynes) defeated PJ Hawx and Mercurio by pinfall	Three-way match	April 29, 2023
59	S7E4	"Season 7, Episode 4"	April 8, 2023; Highland Park, IL	The Spectaculars (Brady Pierce and Rush Freeman) defeated Eric Jackson and Rolando Freeman by pinfall	2023 Crockett Cup Tournament Qualifying match Homicide was the special guest referee	May 6, 2023
59	S7E4	"Season 7, Episode 4"	April 8, 2023; Highland Park, IL	Angelina Love defeated Kylie Paige by pinfall	Singles match	May 6, 2023
59	S7E4	"Season 7, Episode 4"	April 8, 2023; Highland Park, IL	Judais and Max the Impaler (with Father James Mitchell) defeated The Miserably Faithful (Sal Vation and Gaagz the Gymp) by pinfall	2023 Crockett Cup Tournament Qualifying match	May 6, 2023
