= NWA 312 =

2023 National Wrestling Alliance pay-per-view event

- Promotional poster featuring various NWA wrestlers
- Promotion: National Wrestling Alliance
- Date: April 7, 2023
- City: Highland Park, Illinois
- Venue: StudioONE Events

Pay-per-view chronology
← Previous; Nuff Said	Next → Crockett Cup

NWA 312 was a professional wrestling pay-per-view (PPV) event promoted by the National Wrestling Alliance (NWA). It took place on Friday April 7, 2023, at StudioONE in Highland Park, Illinois. The name of the event is in reference to area code 312, the area code of downtown Chicago.

Fourteen matches were contested at the event, including four on the pre-show. In the main event, Tyrus defeated Chris Adonis to retain the NWA Worlds Heavyweight Championship. In other prominent matches, Kamille defeated La Rosa Negra to retain the NWA World Women's Championship, La Rebelión (Bestia 666 and Mecha Wolf) defeated Magnum Muscle (Dak Draper and Mims) to retain the NWA World Tag Team Championship, Kenzie Paige defeated Max the Impaler to become the inaugural NWA World Women's Television Championship, and in the opening bout, EC3 defeated Cyon to win the NWA National Heavyweight Championship.

The event garnered mixed reviews from critics, praising the World Women's title match, but criticized the numerous filler matches throughout the show.

== Production ==
=== Background ===
Other on-screen personnel
Role:	Name:
Commentators	Joe Galli
Commentators	Tim Storm
Commentators	Danny Dealz
Ring announcer	Kyle Davis

On the February 14, 2023 episode of NWA Powerrr, it was announced that NWA 312 would take place on April 7 in Chicago, Illinois. At the same time the NWA announced they were introducing the NWA Women's Television Championship with a new champion being crowned at the PPV. On March 10, the NWA announced a partnership with tea shop Madame Zuzu's – of which NWA president William Patrick Corgan is a co-owner – to benefit the Highland Park Community Foundation in support of victims of the Highland Park parade shooting on July 4, 2022.

=== Storylines ===
NWA 312 will feature professional wrestling matches that involved different wrestlers from pre-existing scripted feuds and storylines. Wrestlers portrayed heroes, villains, or less distinguishable characters in scripted events that built tension and culminated in a wrestling match or series of matches. The twelfth season of the NWA's weekly flagship program, Powerrr, as well as the sixth season of their secondary program, NWA USA, will feature storylines leading up to the event.

On the June 26, 2022 episode of Powerrr, Madusa announced the creation of the NWA World Women's Television Championship. Several months later on the February 14, 2023 Powerrr, with the announcement of NWA 312, it was announced that a tournament will be held to determine the inaugural champion, with the finals set to take place at the event. Qualifying matches will be held over the next several weeks on Powerrr and NWA USA. On the March 14 Powerrr, Kenzie Paige defeated Ashley D'Amboise to advance to the final. The following week, Max the Impaler defeated Taya Valkyrie to make up the other half of the final.

On the February 14 episode of Powerrr, Tyrus successfully defended the NWA Worlds Heavyweight Championship against Rolando Freeman. Although, before his victory, the former was briefly distracted by EC3 standing beside his manager BLK Jeez. The following week, lead announcer Joe Galli interviewed EC3 and BLK Jeez about what transpired, Jeez stated his company name has changed to "Churchs Money Entertainment" and that he has entered into an agreement with EC3's Control Your Narrative group, though EC3 simply stated that he was only "controlling his narrative". He later went on to challenge Cyon for the NWA National Championship at NWA 312, which would later be made official.

On the February 28 Powerrr, Chris Adonis and La Rosa Negra announced that they will both utilize their Champions Series title opportunities at NWA 312, challenging NWA Worlds Heavyweight Champion Tyrus and NWA World Women's Champion Kamille, respectively. Additionally, a month later on the March 28 Powerrr, the team of Magnum Muscle (Matthew Mims and Dak Draper) invoked Draper's opportunity to challenge La Rebelión (Bestia 666 and Mecha Wolf) for the NWA World Tag Team Championship.

On the February 21 Powerrr, Pretty Empowered (Ella Envy and Roxy) won the NWA World Women's Tag Team Championship from The Renegade Twins (Charlette and Robyn Renegade). However, shortly after the match, Madi Wrenkowski and Missa Kate utilized the former's Champion Series title opportunity to immediately win the titles from Pretty Empowered. On March 17, the NWA announced that Pretty Empowered will invoke their rematch clause against Wrenkowski and Kate at NWA 312.

On the March 7 episode of NWA Powerrr, Sal the Pal and Gaagz the Gymp of the Miserably Faithful faced off in a Hair vs. Mask match in order to "prove their loyalty" to Father James Mitchell. However, the match ended in a double countout when both men begged Mitchell not to let them continue fighting. Signs of dissolution would begin to show within the Miserably Faithful. On March 27, the NWA announced that Sal and Gaagz will have a rematch on the NWA 312 pre-show under the same conditions, with the added stipulation of a strap match.

== Reception ==
Tommy Martinez of Slam Wrestling reviewed the event and gave it 3 out of 5 stars. He wrote: "This was an okay show. Not a pay-per-view-worthy show, but a POWERRR-Trip-worthy show. I wish there were some more title changes, but Kenzie winning the World Television championship was the right call, as was EC3's National title win. This might be the set up for more angles but we'll see how that shakes up later." Eddie Vetter of Pro Wrestling Dot Net singled out the World Women's title match as easily the "best match of the show," with the World Tag Team and Junior Heavyweight title bouts also getting praise. He commended the main event for being "put together as well as can be expected", but felt Tyrus was "miscast as a milquetoast, bland babyface." He criticized the show for having a ton of filler throughout the card, critiquing that "NWA would rather get everyone on the show than fill it with good, memorable matches." Justin McClelland of PWTorch also praised the Women's title match for continuing "Kamille's streak of great PPV matches" and for La Rosa Negra's performance, while also calling the Junior Heavyweight and World title bouts an "excellent match" and "surprisingly decent" respectively. He concluded that: "This was a disappointing show with very few good matches, a lot of questionable and/or nonsensical booking choices and little angle advancement ... Even if the match length stayed the same, cutting out a couple matches (like the Battle Royal) and having a few video packages would better connect storyline dots and give important matches and developments a chance to breathe."

== Results ==
No.	Results	Stipulations	Times
1^{P}	Natalia Markova defeated Labrava Escobar (with CJ) by pinfall	Singles match	6:27
2^{P}	The Country Gentlemen (AJ Cazana and Anthony Andrews) (c) defeated The SVGS (Jax Dane and Blake Troop) (with Chris Silvio, Esq.) by pinfall	Tag team match for the NWA United States Tag Team Championship	6:15
3^{P}	Gaagz The Gymp defeated Sal the Pal by pinfall	Hair vs. Mask Strap match Judais was the special guest enforcer.	10:37
4^{P}	Knox and Murdoch (Trevor Murdoch and Mike Knox) defeated Daisy Kill and Talos	Tag team match	6:55
5	EC3 (with BLK Jeez) defeated Cyon (c) (with Austin Idol) by submission	Singles match for the NWA National Heavyweight Championship	9:37
6	Madi Wrenkowski and Missa Kate (c) defeated Pretty Empowered 2.0 (Ella Envy and Roxy) by pinfall	Tag team match for the NWA World Women's Tag Team Championship	8:59
7	Kratos defeated Yabo the Clown by pinfall	Singles match	6:52
8	"Thrillbilly" Silas Mason won by last eliminating Odinson (Note: Participants in order of elimination: Jordan Clearwater, Chico Suave, Mario Pardua, Cody James, The Real Drago, Jackpot Dinero, Vik Dalishus, Hale Collins, Super Beast, Matt Vine, Mercurio, Rhett Titus, Wrecking Ball Legursky, Alex Taylor, Jeremiah Plunkett, Brady Pierce, PJ Hawx, "Magic" Jake Dumas, Rush Freeman, Jay Bradley, Rolando Freeman, Fodder, Homicide, and Eric Jackson.)	Bob Luce Memorial Battle Royal to determine the number one contender to the NWA National Heavyweight Championship	19:00
9	Kenzie Paige defeated Max the Impaler (with Father James Mitchell) by pinfall	Tournament final for the inaugural NWA World Women's Television Championship	8:06
10	Kerry Morton (c) (with Ricky Morton) defeated Joe Alonzo (with Jamie Stanley) by pinfall	Singles match for the NWA World Junior Heavyweight Championship	14:35
11	Bully Ray defeated Thom Latimer by disqualification	Singles match	10:16
12	La Rebelión (Bestia 666 and Mecha Wolf) (c) defeated Magnum Muscle (Dak Draper and Mims) by pinfall	Tag team match for the NWA World Tag Team Championship; This was Draper's Champions Series cash-in match.	10:20
13	Kamille (c) defeated La Rosa Negra by pinfall	Singles match for the NWA World Women's Championship; This was Rosa Negra's Champions Series cash-in match.	13:04
14	Tyrus (c) defeated Chris Adonis by pinfall	Singles match for the NWA Worlds Heavyweight Championship; This was Adonis' Champions Series cash-in match.	12:37
(c) / – the champion(s) heading into the match; P / – the match was broadcast on the pre-show

=== NWA World Women's Television Championship inaugural tournament bracket ===
First round NWA USA (February 18 and 25, 2023; March 4, 2023); NWA Powerrr (February 28, 2023)
KiLynn King	Pin
Kenzie Paige	8:01
Ashley D'Amboise	4:58
Samantha Starr	Pin
Jennacide	Pin
Taya Valkyrie	6:41
Natalia Markova	DQ
Max the Impaler	5:24

Semifinals; NWA Powerrr (March 14 and 21, 2023)
Kenzie Paige	4:21
Ashley D'Amboise	Pin
Taya Valkyrie	4:08
Max the Impaler	Pin

Finals; NWA 312 (April 7, 2023)
Kenzie Paige	8:06
Max the Impaler	Pin
