= List of National Wrestling Alliance employees and personnel =

The National Wrestling Alliance (NWA) is a professional wrestling promotion and governing body based in Los Angeles, California.

NWA personnel consists of professional wrestlers, managers, play-by-play and color commentators, ring announcers, interviewers, referees, trainers, producers, script writers, and various other positions. Executives are listed as well.

== Roster ==
Note - The NWA has a reestablished territory system. As a result, wrestlers from each NWA territory may periodically appear on the main NWA programming, and vice versa.

=== Male wrestlers ===
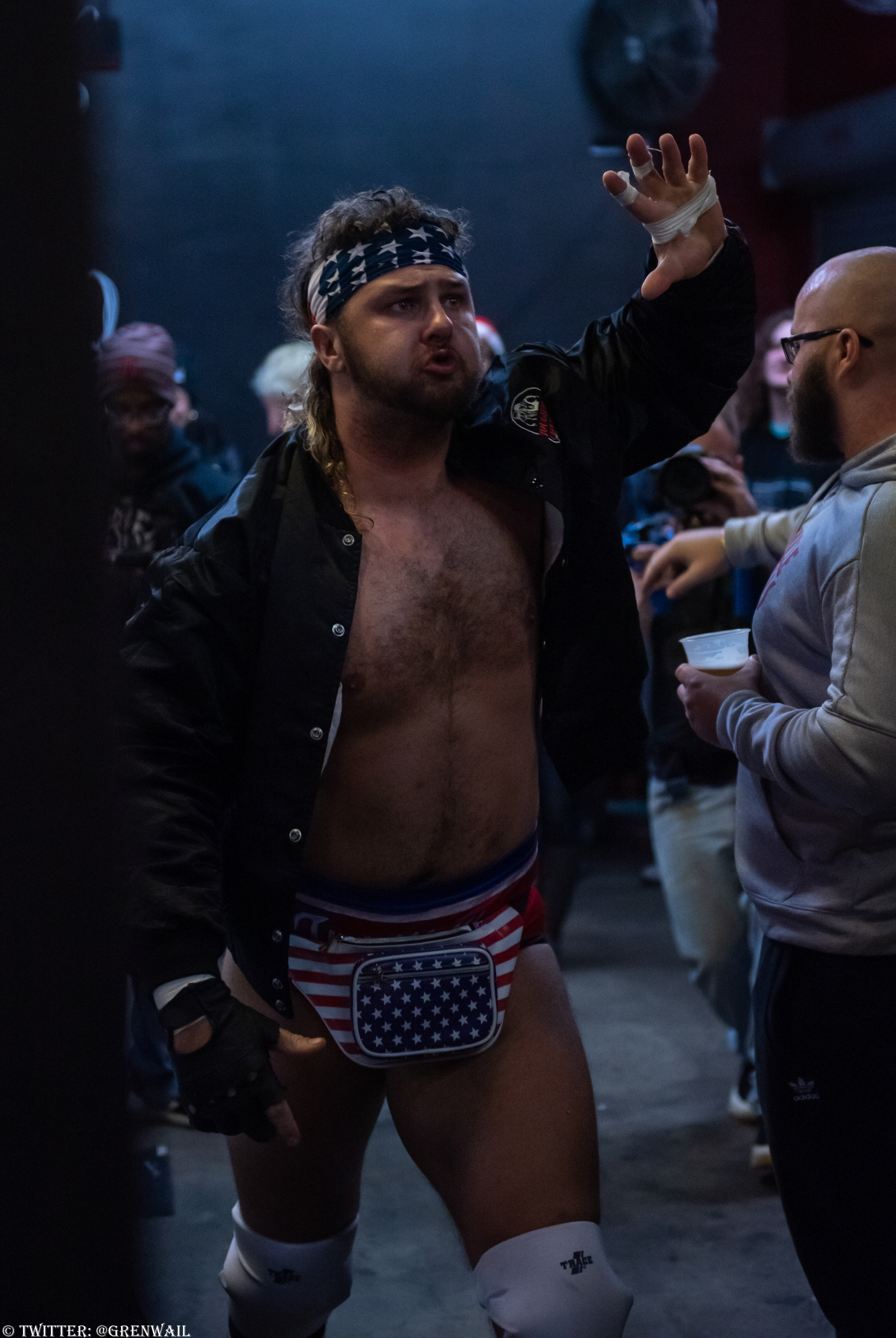
Silas Mason

Ring name	Real name	Notes
AJ Cazana	Andrew Cazana	World Tag Team Champion
Alex Taylor	Alex Willoughby	
Bryan Idol	Brian Balch	National Heavyweight Champion
Carnage	Marshé Rockett	
Carson Drake	Carson Drake	
Colby Corino	Colby Corino	
Daisy Kill	Unknown	
Dalton McKenzie	Dalton McKenzie	United States Tag Team Champion
Damage	Rodney Begnaud	
Damian Fenrir	Unknown	
Eddie Grayson	Unknown	
Effy	Taylor Gibson	
El Dragon Nihan	Unknown	
Eric Smalls	Eric Marcum	
Hayden Backlund	Unknown	World Junior Heavyweight Champion
Heath	Heath Miller	
Jack Valor	Unknown	
Jack Vaughn	Dustin Thomas	United States Tag Team Champion
Jake The Necromancer	Jacob Gill	
Jeremiah Plunkett	Jeremiah Plunkett	Mid-America Heavyweight Champion
KC Cazana	Kirk Cazana	World Tag Team Champion
Kratos	Unknown	
Kerry Morton	Kerry Morton	
Lockjaw Drake	Drake Daniels	
"Duke" Mike Knox	Michael Hettinga	
Mike Mondo	Michael Brendli	
Mims	Matthew Mims	
Mzry	Alex Figueroa	World Television Champion
Pretty Boy Smooth	Paul Bilbo	
The Pope	Elijah Burke	
Ricky Morton	Richard Morton	
Sage Chantz	Unknown	
Silas Mason	Unknown	Worlds Heavyweight Champion
Spencer Slade	Unknown	
Thom Latimer	Thomas Latimer	
Tommy Rant	Unknown	
"Squire" Tyler Franks	Unknown	
"King" Trevor Murdoch	William Mueller	Producer
Wrecking Ball Legursky	Waylon Legursky	

=== Female wrestlers ===
Ring name	Real name	Notes
Gisele Shaw	Gisele Mayordo	
Gretta	Aretta Berntsen	
Kenzie Paige	Kenzie Henry	
Kylie Paige	Kylie Henry	
Liviyah	Unknown	World Women's Tag Team Champion
Mackenzie Morgan	Unknown	World Women's Tag Team Champion
Natalia Markova	Natalia Markova	
Sirena Veil	Unknown	World Women's Television Champion
Tiffany Nieves	Tiffany Nieves	World Women's Champion

=== Other on-air personnel ===
Ring name	Real name	Notes
Aron Stevens	Aron Haddad	Manager of The Federation of Champions
Brandon McCord	Unknown	Manager of The McCord Collection
Joe Cazana	Joseph Cazana	Manager of The Country Gentlemen
Miss Starr	Mikala Smith	Manager of TVMA
Pastor C-Lo	Charleston Lovewell	Manager of Pretty Boy Smooth

==== Broadcast team ====
Ring name	Real name	Notes
Joe Galli	Joseph Galli	Senior broadcaster Play-by-play commentator
Danny Dealz	Anthony Lucassio	Color commentator
Tim Storm	Timothy Scoggins	Color commentator
Kyle Davis	Kyle Durden	Ring announcer Interviewer

==== Referees ====
Ring name	Real name	Notes
Kevin Keenan	Kevin Keenan	Senior referee
Jarrod Fritz	Jarrod Fritz	
Scott Wheeler	Scott Wheeler	
Ashley Stout	Ashley Stout	

==== Backstage personnel ====
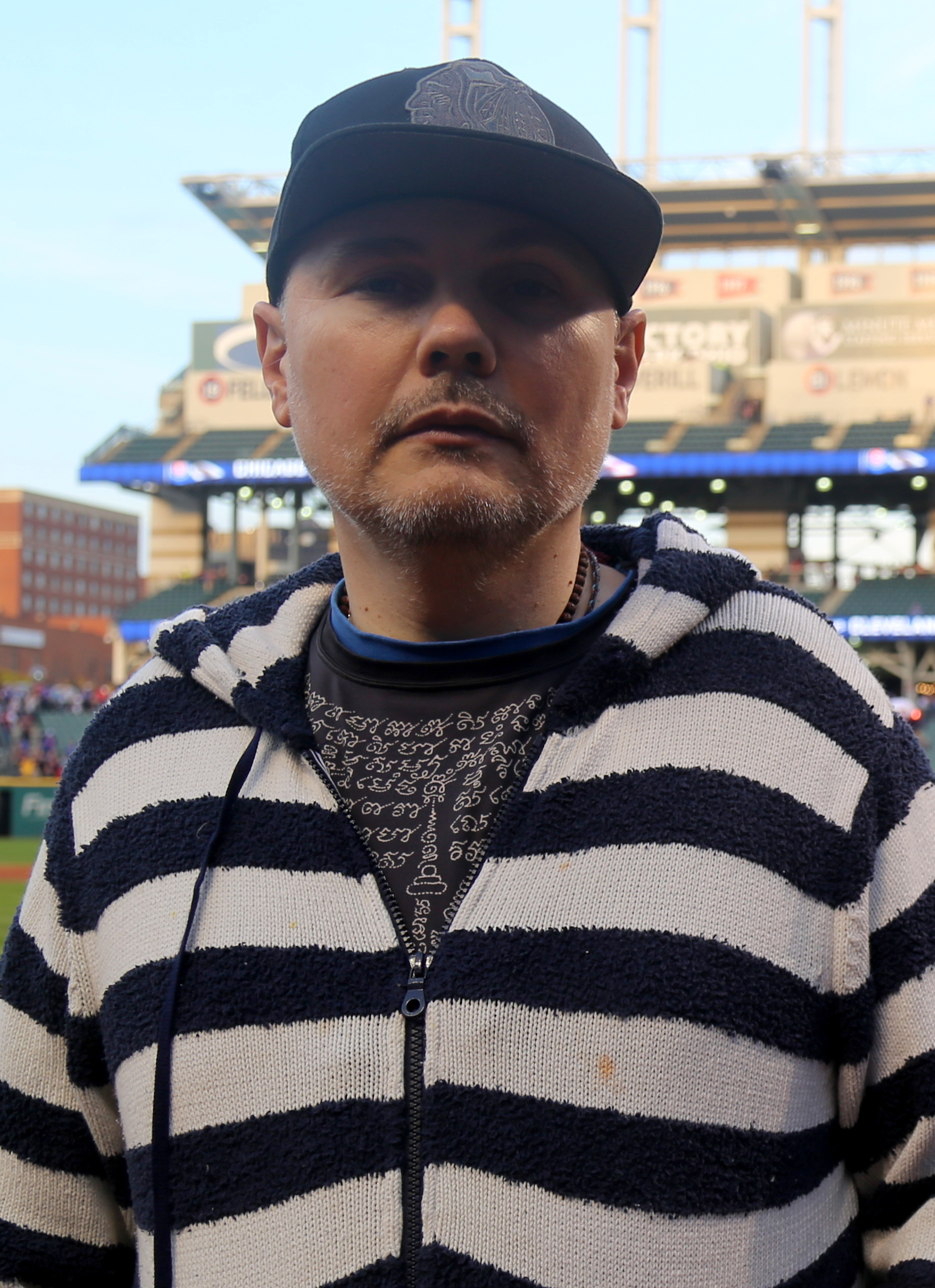
Billy Corgan

Name	Real name	Notes
Billy Corgan	William Patrick Corgan	Owner; President; Executive producer
Pat Kenney	Patrick Kenney	Director of Talent Relations; Executive producer
Billy Trask	William Trask	Director of Television Production; Producer
Bill Behrens	William Behrens	Producer
Rick Michaels	Richard Michaels	Producer
Paul E. Pratt	Pollo Del Mar	Floor director Producer
