= NWA 75th Anniversary Show =

2023 National Wrestling Alliance event

NWA 75
- Promotional poster
- Promotion: National Wrestling Alliance
- Date: August 26–27, 2023
- City: St. Louis, Missouri
- Venue: Chase's Khorassan Ballroom

Pay-per-view chronology
← Previous; Crockett Cup	Next → Samhain

NWA Anniversary Show chronology
← Previous; 74th	Next → 76th

The NWA 75th Anniversary Show (also simply called NWA 75) was a two-day professional wrestling pay-per-view event produced by the National Wrestling Alliance (NWA). It was held on August 26 and 27, 2023, at the Chase's Khorassan Ballroom in St. Louis, Missouri. It was the 13th event under the NWA Anniversary Show chronology.

The card comprised a total of 27 matches, with 14 on the first night and 13 on the second, including four matches on Night 1's pre-show and three on Night 2. In the main event for Night 1, Kamille defeated Natalia Markova in a No Limits match to retain the NWA World Women's Championship. In the main event for Night 2, EC3 defeated Tyrus in a Bullrope match to win the NWA Worlds Heavyweight Championship, resulting in Tyrus retiring from in-ring competition.

== Production ==
=== Background ===
Other on-screen personnel
Role:	Name:
Commentators	Joe Galli (night 1)
Commentators	Tim Storm (night 2)
Commentators	Danny Dealz (night 2)
Commentators	Velvet Sky
Ring announcer	Kyle Davis
Interviewer	Kyle Davis

The NWA Anniversary Show is a professional wrestling event held by the National Wrestling Alliance (NWA). The first event was held in 1998 to celebrate the 50th anniversary of the 1948 founding of the NWA. The event then continued to be held annually until 2005. It has since been held periodically, with shows held in 2008, 2018, 2021, and 2022.

At the NWA 74th Anniversary Show, Billy Corgan announced that the NWA 75th Anniversary Show would take place across two nights on August 26 and 27, 2023, in St. Louis, Missouri, from the Chase's Khorassan Ballroom.

=== Storylines ===
The event featured professional wrestling matches that involve different wrestlers from pre-existing scripted feuds and storylines. Wrestlers portray heroes, villains, or less distinguishable characters in scripted events that built tension and culminate in a wrestling match or series of matches. Storylines are produced during the fourteenth season of the NWA's weekly series, Powerrr.

On the July 11 episode of Powerrr, after EC3 successfully defended the NWA National Heavyweight Championship, he dropped the title in the ring, officially relinquishing it to challenge Tyrus for the NWA Worlds Heavyweight Championship at NWA 75. Over two weeks later, Tyrus requested that the match be made a bullrope match given the history between him and EC3 stemming across Impact Wrestling and WWE. He also proposed the stipulation that he would retire should he lose the match.

On Night 2 of the Crockett Cup, Colby Corino won a Seven-Way Scramble to earn an NWA World Junior Heavyweight Championship match against champion Kerry Morton at NWA 75. The match would take place on Night 1.

On the July 11 episode of Powerrr, the NWA announced the NWA United States Tag Team Championship Showdown, a four-team tournament to determine the number one contenders to champions The Country Gentlemen (AJ Cazana and Anthony Andrews) on Night 2 of NWA 75. The tournament began the following week, with The Fixers (Jay Bradley and Wrecking Ball Legursky) and Daisy Kill and Talos advancing to the finals, which will take place on Night 1 of NWA 75.

On the July 25 episode of Powerrr, Jax Dane lost to Carnage by countout. After the match, commentator Tim Storm commented on how had never seen Dane look so vulnerable to which Dane angrily confronted Storm about it. Two weeks later, Dane confronted Storm at the commentary table again, challenging him to a match at NWA 75, which storm accepted. The match would be made a no disqualification match

On the August 8 episode of Powerrr, Ella Envy defeated Missa Kate to earn Pretty Empowered (Envy and Kylie Paige) an NWA World Women's Tag Team Championship match against M95 (Kate and Madi Wrenkowski) at NWA 75.

== Results ==
=== Night 1 ===
No.	Results	Stipulations	Times
1^{P}	Robert Anthony defeated "Magic" Jake Dumas by pinfall	Singles match	5:40
2^{P}	Daisy Kill and Talos defeated The Fixers (Jay Bradley and Wrecking Ball Legursky) by pinfall	NWA United States Tag Team Championship Showdown Final (Note: Winners faced The Country Gentlemen (AJ Cazana and Anthony Andrews) for the NWA United States Tag Team Championship on Night 2)	7:14
3^{P}	Zyon (with Austin Idol) defeated Jordan Clearwater by submission	Singles match	6:49
4^{P}	Jack Cartwheel defeated Alex Taylor (with Danny Dealz), Eric Jackson, Koa Laxamana (with Kallies) and Matt Vine by pinfall	Jubilee Jamboree match for an NWA World Junior Heavyweight Championship match	6:27
5	Max the Impaler (with Father James Mitchell) defeated Kenzie Paige (c) by pinfall	Singles match for the NWA World Women's Television Championship	6:40
6	"Thrillbilly" Silas Mason (with Pollo Del Mar) defeated J. R. Kratos and Odinson by pinfall	Three-way match for the vacant NWA National Heavyweight Championship	9:14
7	Joe Alonzo defeated Homicide by pinfall	No Disqualification match	10:02
8	The Brothers of Funstruction (Ruffo and Yabo) (with Violent J) defeated Magnum Muscle (Mims and Dak Draper) by pinfall	Tag team match	6:14
9	Colby Corino (with Jamie Stanley) defeated Kerry Morton (c) by pinfall	Singles match for the NWA World Junior Heavyweight Championship	12:09
10	Jax Dane (with Chris Silvio, Esq.) defeated Tim Storm by referee stoppage	No Disqualification match	3:09
11	Kenzie Paige won by last eliminating Allysin Kay	Burke Invitational Gauntlet for an NWA World Women's Championship match	15:14
12	Matt Cardona defeated Ricky Morton by pinfall	Singles match	5:26
13	Blunt Force Trauma (Carnage and Damage) (with Aron Stevens) defeated La Rebelión (Bestia 666 and Mecha Wolf) (c) (with Vampiro) by pinfall	Tag team match for the NWA World Tag Team Championship	9:16
14	Kamille (c) defeated Natalia Markova by pinfall	No Limits match for the NWA World Women's Championship	15:37
(c) / – the champion(s) heading into the match; P / – the match was broadcast on the pre-show

=== Night 2 ===
No.	Results	Stipulations	Times
1^{P}	Jordan Clearwater won by last eliminating Zyon	Austin Idol's National Championship Battle Royal for an NWA National Heavyweight Championship match later in the show (Note: Participants in order of elimination: Judais, Rush Freeman, Rolando Freeman, Brady Pierce, Matt Vine, Koa Laxamana, Cody James, "Magic" Jake Dumas, Wrecking Ball Legursky, Jay Bradley, Jax Dane, Turbo Floyd, Gaagz the Gymp, Truth Magnum, Mims, Robert Anthony, Joe Alonzo, Dak Draper, Sal the Pal, Zicky Dice, Blake "Bulletproof" Troop, and Zyon.)	15:56
2^{P}	Natalia Markova defeated Taylor Rising by pinfall	Singles match	6:03
3^{P}	Talos and Daisy Kill defeated The Country Gentlemen (Anthony Andrews and AJ Cazana) (c) by pinfall	Tag team match for the NWA United States Tag Team Championship	7:34
4	Thom Latimer (c) defeated Chris Adonis by submission	Singles match for the NWA World Television Championship; Since Latimer retained, he can invoke the Lucky Seven Rule to challenge for the NWA Worlds Heavyweight Championship.	9:57
5	Pretty Empowered (Ella Envy and Kylie Paige) defeated M95 (Madi and Missa Kate) (c) by pinfall	Tag team match for the NWA World Women's Tag Team Championship	7:46
6	Colby Corino (c) (with Jamie Stanley) defeated Jack Cartwheel by pinfall	Singles match for the NWA World Junior Heavyweight Championship	10:24
7	Max the Impaler (c) (with Father James Mitchell) defeated Ruthie Jay by pinfall	Singles match for the NWA World Women's Television Championship	5:47
8	La Rebelión (Bestia 666 and Mecha Wolf) (with Vampiro) defeated The Brothers of Funstruction (Ruffo the Clown and Yabo the Clown) (with Violent J) by pinfall	Tag team match	8:05
9	Kerry Morton (with Ricky Morton) defeated Matt Cardona by pinfall	Singles match	9:22
10	"Thrillbilly" Silas Mason (c) defeated Jordan Clearwater by pinfall	Singles match for the NWA National Heavyweight Championship	7:06
11	Blunt Force Trauma (Carnage and Damage) (c) (with Aron Stevens) defeated Knox and Murdoch by pinfall	Tag team match for the NWA World Tag Team Championship	11:41
12	Kenzie Paige defeated Kamille (c) by pinfall	Singles match for the NWA World Women's Championship	13:04
13	EC3 defeated Tyrus (c) by submission	Bullrope match for the NWA Worlds Heavyweight Championship; Since Tyrus lost, he had to retire from in-ring competition.	17:21
(c) / – the champion(s) heading into the match; P / – the match was broadcast on the pre-show

=== NWA United States Tag Team Championship Showdown bracket ===
Semifinals; NWA Powerrr; July 18
Daisy Kill and Talos	Pin
Magic Inc. (Cody James and "Magic" Jake Dumas)	6:59
The Fixers (Jay Bradley and Wrecking Ball Legursky)	Pin
The Spectaculars (Brady Pierce and Rush Freeman)	5:38

Final; NWA 75, Night 1 August 26
Daisy Kill and Talos	Pin
The Fixers	7:14

=== Burke Invitational gauntlet match entrances and eliminations ===
Draw	Entrant	Order	Eliminated by	Method of elimination	Elimination(s)
1	Kenzie Paige	–	Winner	–	5
2	Taylor Rising	1	Samantha Starr	Pinfall	0
3	Ruthie Jay	10	Allysin Kay	Over the top rope	1
4	Heather Monroe	2	Kenzie Paige	Pinfall	0
5	Samantha Starr	3	MJ Jenkins	Pinfall	1
6	Allysin Kay	11	Kenzie Paige	Over the top rope	3
7	MJ Jenkins	6	Kenzie Paige and Max the Impaler	Pinfall	1
8	CJ	4	Allysin Kay	Over the top rope	0
9	Labrava Escobar	5	Kenzie Paige	Over the top rope	0
10	The WOAD	7	Max the Impaler	Pinfall	0
11	Sierra	8	Max the Impaler	Pinfall	0
12	Max the Impaler	9	Allysin Kay, Kenzie Paige and Ruthie Jay	Pinfall	3

== See also ==
- 2023 in professional wrestling
