= NWA 74th Anniversary Show =

2022 National Wrestling Alliance event

NWA 74
- Promotional poster
- Promotion: National Wrestling Alliance
- Date: August 27–28, 2022
- City: St. Louis, Missouri
- Venue: Chase's Khorassan Ballroom

Pay-per-view chronology
← Previous; Alwayz Ready	Next → Hard Times 3

NWA Anniversary Show chronology
← Previous; 73rd	Next → 75th

The NWA 74th Anniversary Show (also simply called NWA 74) was a two-day professional wrestling pay-per-view event produced by the National Wrestling Alliance (NWA) held on August 27 and 28, 2022, at the Chase's Khorassan Ballroom in St. Louis, Missouri.

The card comprised a total of 30 matches, with 14 on the first night and 16 on the second, including four matches on each night's pre-show. In the main event for Night 1, Kamille defeated Taya Valkyrie to retain the NWA World Women's Championship. In other prominent matches, La Rebelión (Bestia 666 and Mecha Wolf 450) defeated Hawx Aerie (Luke Hawx and PJ Hawx) to win the vacant NWA World Tag Team Championship, Cyon defeated Jax Dane to win the NWA National Championship, and Max the Impaler won the Burke Invitational Gauntlet to get an NWA World Women's Championship match on Night 2. In the main event for Night 2, Trevor Murdoch defeated Tyrus to retain the NWA Worlds Heavyweight Championship. In other prominent matches, Kamille defeated Max the Impaler to retain the NWA World Women's Championship, Pretty Empowered (Ella Envy and Kenzie Paige) defeated The Hex (Allysin Kay and Marti Belle) in a Kingshighway Street Fight to retain the NWA World Women's Tag Team Championship, and The Fixers (Jay Bradley and Wrecking Ball Legursky) won a tag team battle royal to become the inaugural NWA United States Tag Team Champions.

== Production ==
=== Background ===
Other on-screen personnel
Role:	Name:
Commentators	Joe Galli
Commentators	Tim Storm
Commentators	Velvet Sky
Ring announcer	Kyle Davis
Interviewer	Kyle Davis

At Alwayz Ready, the National Wrestling Alliance announced that the NWA 74th Anniversary Show would take place across two nights on August 27 and 28 in St. Louis, Missouri, from the Chase's Khorassan Ballroom.

=== Storylines ===
The event featured professional wrestling matches that involved different wrestlers from pre-existing scripted feuds and storylines. Wrestlers portrayed heroes, villains, or less distinguishable characters in scripted events that built tension and culminated in a wrestling match or series of matches. Storylines were produced during the ninth season and third season, respectively, of the NWA's weekly series; Powerrr and USA.

On the July 5 episode of Powerrr, NWA president William Patrick Corgan announced the "Race to The Chase" tournament, which would determine Trevor Murdoch's number one contender to the NWA Worlds Heavyweight Championship at the event. The tournament began the following week, where Thom Latimer, Brian Myers, and Nick Aldis advanced after defeating Chris Adonis, The Pope, and Tim Storm, respectively. The following week, Aldis defeated Myers, Latimer, and Mike Knox - who earned a bye thanks to former champion Matt Cardona - in a four-way match for the finals to become the number one contender. However, after Aldis made comments on Twitter alleging "goalpost-moving" that drew the ire of Corgan, the latter announced on the July 21 edition of Busted Open Radio that Aldis had been stripped of his #1 contender status and would be replaced by the NWA World Television Champion Tyrus.

On July 19, the NWA announced that the NWA United States Tag Team Championship would be revived, and new champions would be determined in a battle royal on Night 2 of NWA 74.

The following wrestlers were announced as participants:

- Gold Rushhh (Jordan Clearwater and Marshe Rockett)
- The Miserably Faithful (Sal The Pal and Gaagz The Gymp) (with Father James Mitchell)
- The NOW (Hale Collins and Vik Dalishus)
- The Ill Begotten (Alex Taylor and Jeremiah Plunkett) (with Danny Dealz)
- Ruff 'n' Ready (D'Vin Graves and Diante)
- The Fixers (Jay Bradley and Wrecking Ball Legursky)
- Hawx Aerie (Luke Hawx and PJ Hawx)
- The Country Gentlemen (AJ Cazana and Anthony Andrews)
- Team Ambition (Mike Outlaw and Camaro Jackson)
- The Spectaculars (Brady Pierce and Rush Freeman) (with Rolando Freeman)

On the June 14 episode of NWA Powerrr, Bully Ray, special master of ceremonies for the night, was confronted by Mike Knox and VSK of the Cardona Family. Knox initially acted in kind to Ray, due to their past as members of Aces & Eights in Impact Wrestling. However, after accusing Ray of "leaving him high and dry" in Impact, Knox and VSK would attack him before putting him through a table. For the next several weeks, Knox would continue to disparage Bully Ray's name, while claiming to see Ray everywhere he goes. During an appearance on Busted Open Radio on July 21, NWA President Billy Corgan announced that Ray would make his NWA in-ring debut against Knox in a tables match on Night 1 of NWA 74.

On the July 26 "EmPowerrred" edition of Powerrr, Taya Valkyrie defeated KiLynn King to become the number one contender for the NWA World Women's Championship. Later in the main event, current champion Kamille defeated Chelsea Green to retain the title, with her and Valkyrie facing each other in the main event of Night 1 of NWA 74. Earlier that day, the NWA announced the return of the "Burke Invitational" - formerly the "NWA Women's' Invitational" - where rising female wrestlers compete in a gauntlet match on Night 1 for the Burke Cup and a Women's World Championship match on Night 2.

The following wrestlers were announced as participants:

- Samantha Starr (with Baby Doll)
- KiLynn King
- Tootie Lynn
- Missa Kate
- Max the Impaler (with Father James Mitchell)
- Madi Wrenkowski
- Angelina Love
- Jennacide
- Natalia Markova
- Taryn Terrell

On the July 5 episode of Powerrr, NWA World Junior Heavyweight Champion Homicide had an interview with Kyle Davis praising the Morton Family (Kerry and Ricky Morton). Though he gave credit to the father and son, he claimed Kerry still didn't have an "it" factor" to make it in professional wrestling, but still offered him a title shot at NWA 74. The following week saw Kerry respond, talking about how the championship was one held by his father, and that he wanted to uphold the prestige of that title.

On the August 2 edition of Powerrr, Cyon, the newest member of Austin Idol's stable Idolmania Sports Management, defeated Rodney Mack in an NWA National Heavyweight Championship number one contender's match, earning him a title shot against champion Jax Dane on Night 1 of NWA 74.

On Night 2 of the Crockett Cup, The Hex (Allysin Kay and Marti Belle) defeated Pretty Empowered (Ella Envy and Kenzie Paige) to retain the NWA World Women's Tag Team Championship. The two teams would have a rematch at Alwayz Ready, where Pretty Empowered would win the titles after Envy struck Belle with a low blow. A third match would take place on the July 2 episode of NWA USA, where Pretty Empowered retained due to Envy hitting Kay with one of the title belts. On August 3, after an episode of Busted Open Radio, it was announced that Pretty Empowered will again defend the titles against The Hex in a Kingshighway Street Fight on Night 2 of NWA 74.

At GCW Downward Spiral, Matt Cardona suffered a torn bicep during his match against Blake Christian. The injury forced him to vacate many of the championships he held at the time, including the NWA Worlds Heavyweight Championship, which he was scheduled to defend at Alwayz Ready. On August 5, the NWA announced that Cardona would make his in-ring return on Night 1 of NWA 74, facing an opponent of his choosing.

At Alwayz Ready, The Commonwealth Connection (Doug Williams and Harry Smith) won the NWA World Tag Team Championship from La Rebelión (Bestia 666 and Mecha Wolf 450). The two would face off in a rematch under Lucha Rules at the following "Knox Out" Powerrr taping, where The Commonwealth Connection retained. After defeating The OGK (Matt Taven and Mike Bennett) in their rivalry, with assistance from Bestia's father Damián 666, La Rebelión will face The Commonwealth Connection on Night 1 of NWA 74 for the titles. However, on the day of the show, it was announced that Smith withdrew due to illness; the titles were subsequently vacated. Hawx Aerie (Luke and PJ Hawx) would replace The Commonwealth Connection to face La Rebelión for the now-vacant titles.

== Results ==
Night 1
No.	Results	Stipulations	Times
1^{P}	The Country Gentlemen (AJ Cazana and Anthony Andrews) (with Joe Cazana) defeated Gold Rushhh (Jordan Clearwater and Marshe Rockett) (with Austin Idol) by pinfall	Tag team match	6:35
2^{P}	Rhett Titus defeated VSK by pinfall	Singles match	5:46
3^{P}	Rodney Mack (with Aron Stevens) defeated Da Pope by submission	Singles match	4:48
4^{P}	Caprice Coleman and Gustavo Aguilar defeated Colby Corino and Wrecking Ball Legursky by submission	"Pick Your Poison" tag team match Since Coleman and Aguilar won, Coleman vs. Corino on Night 2 would be a two-out-of-three falls match Had Corino and Legursky won, that match would have been a 30-minute iron man match	7:29
5	EC3 defeated Mims by submission	Singles match	4:52
6	The Miserably Faithful (Judais, Sal The Pal, and Gaagz The Gymp) (with Father James Mitchell) defeated The Ill Begotten (Alex Taylor, Jeremiah Plunkett, and Danny Dealz) by pinfall	Beelzebub's Bedlam match	9:41
7	Chris Adonis defeated Odinson via disqualification	Singles match	7:26
8	Homicide (c) defeated Kerry Morton (with Ricky Morton) by pinfall	Singles match for the NWA World Junior Heavyweight Championship	12:38
9	Rolando Freeman defeated Matt Cardona by pinfall	Singles match	5:41
10	Max the Impaler (with Father James Mitchell) won by last eliminating Natalia Markova	Burke Invitational Gauntlet for an NWA World Women's Championship match	17:24
11	Cyon (with Austin Idol) defeated Jax Dane (with Chris Silvio, Esq.) (c) by pinfall	Singles match for the NWA National Championship	7:26
12	Bully Ray defeated Mike Knox	Tables match	8:38
13	La Rebelión (Bestia 666 and Mecha Wolf 450) (with Damián 666) defeated Hawx Aerie (Luke Hawx and PJ Hawx) by pinfall	Tag team match for the vacant NWA World Tag Team Championship	13:10
14	Kamille (c) defeated Taya Valkyrie by pinfall	Singles match for the NWA World Women's Championship	18:57
(c) / – the champion(s) heading into the match; P / – the match was broadcast on the pre-show

Night 2
No.	Results	Stipulations	Times
1^{P}	Doug Williams vs. Rhett Titus ended in a time limit draw	Submission match	10:00
2^{P}	Angelina Love defeated Taryn Terrell by pinfall	Singles match	5:32
3^{P}	Kerry Morton defeated Gustavo Aguilar by pinfall	Singles match	4:33
4^{P}	Natalia Markova defeated Missa Kate, Madi Wrenkowski, KiLynn King, Jennacide, and Taya Valkyrie	Queen Bee match: Stage 1: Six-woman tag team match (Markova, Kate, and Wrenkowski defeated King, Jennacide, and Valkyrie by pinfall); Stage 2: Three-way elimination match (Missa Kate eliminated Madi Wrenkowski, Natalia Markova eliminated Missa Kate)	10:17
5	Colby Corino defeated Caprice Coleman 2-1	Two-out-of-three falls match	9:57
6	The Fixers (Jay Bradley and Wrecking Ball Legursky) won by last eliminating Team Ambition (Mike Outlaw and Camaro Jackson) (Note: Other participants in order of elimination: Gold Rushhh (Jordan Clearwater and Marshe Rockett), The Miserably Faithful (Sal The Pal and Gaagz The Gymp) (with Father James Mitchell), The Ill Begotten (Alex Taylor and Jeremiah Plunkett) (with Danny Dealz), The Spectaculars (Brady Pierce and Rush Freeman) (with Rolando Freeman), Ruff 'n' Ready (D'Vin Graves and Diante), The Country Gentlemen (AJ Cazana and Anthony Andrews), The NOW (Hale Collins and Vik Dalishus), Hawx Aerie (Luke Hawx and PJ Hawx), La Rebelión (Bestia 666 and Mecha Wolf 450) (with Damián 666), and The OGK (Matt Taven and Mike Bennett) (with J. J. Dillon).)	Tag team battle royal for the vacant NWA United States Tag Team Championship	14:07
7	"Magic" Jake Dumas (with Christi Jaynes) defeated Mercurio by pinfall	Singles match	7:15
8	Davey Richards (c) defeated "Thrillbilly" Silas Mason (with Pollo Del Mar) by submission	Singles match for the MLW National Openweight Championship	10:24
9	Cyon (c) (with Austin Idol) defeated Anthony Mayweather by pinfall	Singles match for the NWA National Championship	8:18
10	Pretty Empowered (Ella Envy and Kenzie Paige) (c) defeated The Hex (Allysin Kay and Marti Belle) by pinfall	Kingshighway Street Fight for the NWA World Women's Tag Team Championship	10:02
11	Homicide (c) defeated Ricky Morton by pinfall	Singles match for the NWA World Junior Heavyweight Championship	6:12
12	Nick Aldis defeated Flip Gordon by submission	Singles match	8:43
13	J. R. Kratos and Da Pope defeated Aron Stevens and Rodney Mack by pinfall	Missouri Tornado tag team match	9:40
14	Thom Latimer vs. EC3 ended in a no contest	Singles match	6:42
15	Kamille (c) defeated Max the Impaler (with Father James Mitchell) by pinfall	Singles match for the NWA World Women's Championship	11:07
16	Trevor Murdoch (c) defeated Tyrus (with BLK Jeez) by pinfall	Singles match for the NWA Worlds Heavyweight Championship	13:44
(c) / – the champion(s) heading into the match; P / – the match was broadcast on the pre-show

=== Race to The Chase Tournament brackets ===
First Round; NWA Power; July 12
Mike Knox	Bye^{1}
—	—
Chris Adonis	6:48
Thom Latimer	Pin
Brian Myers	Pin
The Pope	6:56
Nick Aldis	DQ
Tim Storm^{2}	8:30

Final; NWA Power; July 19
Mike Knox	—
Thom Latiemr	—
Brian Myers	8:47
Nick Aldis^{3}	Pin

1 Mike Knox was afforded a bye due to his friend and former champion Matt Cardona's sway

2 Tim Storm previously lost his privilege to challenge for the NWA Worlds Heavyweight Championship but was allowed in the tournament by champion Trevor Murdoch

3 Tyrus replaces Nick Aldis due to unconfirmed reasons

=== Burke Invitational gauntlet match entrances and eliminations ===
Draw	Entrant	Order	Eliminated by	Method of elimination	Elimination(s)
1	KiLynn King	7	Natalia Markova	Pinfall	1
2	Samantha Starr	6	Jenacide	Submission	0
3	Natalia Markova	9	Max the Impaler	Pinfall	1
4	Missa Kate	1	KiLynn King	Over the top rope	0
5	Madi Wrenkowski	2	Herself	Over the top rope	0
6	Taryn Terrell	5	Max the Impaler	Over the top rope	0
7	Max the Impaler	–	Winner	–	5
8	Tootie Lynn	3	Max the Impaler	Over the top rope	0
9	Angelina Love	4	Max the Impaler	Over the top rope	0
10	Jennacide	8	Max the Impaler	Pinfall	1

== See also ==
- 2022 in professional wrestling
