= NWA World Women's Television Championship =

Women's professional wrestling championship

- The NWA World Women's Television Championship belt

Details
- Promotion: NWA
- Date established: July 26, 2022
- Current champion: Sirena Veil
- Date won: July 25, 2026 (aired September 12, 2026)
Statistics
- First champion: Kenzie Paige
- Longest reign: Tiffany Nieves (453 days)
- Shortest reign: Big Mama (107 days)
- Oldest champion: Big Mama (36 years, 250 days)
- Youngest champion: Kenzie Paige (21 years, 33 days)
- Heaviest champion: Max the Impaler (209 lb (95 kg))
- Lightest champion: Kenzie Paige (125 lb (57 kg))

The NWA World Women's Television Championship is a women's professional wrestling championship owned and promoted by the American professional wrestling promotion National Wrestling Alliance (NWA). It is the secondary championship of the promotion's female division. Originally, it was represented by a trophy, reminiscent of Continental Championship Wrestling's Television Championship, but was then replaced by a championship belt. The new belt was revealed on June 3, 2023, during the two-day Crockett Cup event.

== History ==
On the July 26, 2022, episode of NWA's weekly flagship program, NWA Powerrr, Madusa announced they were introducing the NWA World Women's Television Championship. On the February 14, 2023, episode of NWA Powerrr, NWA introduced the title for the women's division with a tournament to determine the inaugural holder of the championship at their next PPV, NWA 312, on April 7. Like the NWA World Television Championship, it used the "Lucky Seven Rule". A champion who successfully defended the championship seven consecutive times would be eligible to trade in the championship for a match for the NWA World Women's Championship. At NWA 312, Kenzie Paige became the inaugural champion after defeating Max the Impaler in the finals.

=== Inaugural tournament ===
First round NWA USA (February 18 and 25, 2023; March 4, 2023); NWA Powerrr (February 28, 2023)
KiLynn King	Pin
Kenzie Paige	8:01
Ashley D'Amboise	4:58
Samantha Starr	Pin
Jennacide	Pin
Taya Valkyrie	6:41
Natalia Markova	DQ
Max the Impaler	5:24

Semifinals; NWA Powerrr (March 14 and 21, 2023)
Kenzie Paige	4:21
Ashley D'Amboise	Pin
Taya Valkyrie	4:08
Max the Impaler	Pin

Finals; NWA 312 (April 7, 2023)
Kenzie Paige	8:06
Max the Impaler	Pin

== Reigns ==
As of September 16, 2026, there have been 6 reigns between 6 wrestlers. Kenzie Paige was the inaugural champion. Tiffany Nieves' reign is the longest at 453 days, while Big Mama's reign is the shortest at 107 days. Big Mama is the oldest champion at 36 years old, while Kenzie Paige is the youngest at 21 years old.

Sirena Veil is the current champion in her first reign. She won the title by defeating Gisele Shaw at NWA's 78th Anniversary Show in Philadelphia, Pennsylvania, on July 25, 2026.

Key
No.	Overall reign number
Reign	Reign number for the specific champion
Days	Number of days held
+	Current reign is changing daily

No.	Champion	Championship change			Reign statistics		Notes	Ref.
No.	Champion	Date	Event	Location	Reign	Days	Notes	Ref.
National Wrestling Alliance/Lightning One Inc.
1	Kenzie Paige	April 7, 2023	NWA 312	Highland Park, IL	1	141	Defeated Max the Impaler in the finals of an eight-woman single-elimination tournament to become the inaugural champion.	
2	Max the Impaler	August 26, 2023	NWA 75th Anniversary Show	St. Louis, MO	1	280		
—	Vacated	June 1, 2024	NWA Back to the Territories	Knoxville, TN	—	—	Max the Impaler voluntarily vacated the championship to wrestle for the NWA World Women's Championship at NWA 76 as part of the "Lucky Seven Rule". Aired on tape delay September 3, 2024 as a special episode of Powerrr.	
3	Big Mama	October 18, 2024	NWA Chicago Super Smashing Halloween	Highland Park, IL	1	107	Defeated Haley J, Natalia Markova and Tiffany Nieves in a four-way match to win the vacant title.	
4	Tiffany Nieves	February 2, 2025	NWA Powerrr	Tampa, FL	1	453	Aired on tape delay on May 13, 2025.	
5	Gisele Shaw	April 4, 2026	Crockett Cup	Forney, TX	1	112	Aired on tape delay on May 1, 2026 as a special episode of Powerrr. Shaw defended the championship at EmPowerrr against Mackenzie Morgan on August 28, 2026, due to her title loss not having aired yet.	
6	Sirena Veil	July 25, 2026	NWA 78th Anniversary Show	Philadelphia, PA	1	53+	Aired on tape delay on September 12, 2026 as a special episode of Powerrr.	
