= NWA USA =

American professional wrestling television program

- NWA USA logo
- Genre: Professional wrestling
- Created by: Billy Corgan
- Presented by: Joe Galli (play-by-play commentator); Tim Storm (color commentator); Velvet Sky (color commentator)
- Starring: NWA roster
- Opening theme: Unknown
- Country of origin: United States
- Original language: English
- No. of seasons: 7
- No. of episodes: 59 (list of episodes)

Production
- Producers: Billy Corgan (Owner/President); Billy Trask (Director of Television)
- Camera setup: Multicamera setup
- Running time: 30 minutes
- Production companies: Lightning One, Inc.

Original release
- Network: YouTube
- Release: January 8, 2022 – May 8, 2023

NWA USA is a professional wrestling streaming television program produced by the National Wrestling Alliance (NWA) that premiered on January 8, 2022 on YouTube.

A companion series to NWA Powerrr, USA primarily revolves around the NWA Junior Heavyweight Championship, the NWA United States Tag Team Championship, and the NWA World Women's Television Championship divisions.

== Episodes ==
As with NWA Powerrr, each season of NWA USA focuses on storylines leading into the NWA's main pay-per-view events.

== On-air personalities ==
In addition to the wrestlers (male and female), managers/valets, and referees, the show features various on-air personalities including authority figures, commentators, ring announcers, and backstage interviewers.

=== Authority figures ===
Authority figures	Position	Dates	Notes
Tim Storm	Managing Director	January 8, 2022 - May 8, 2023	
Madusa	Co-Managing Director	February 19, 2022 - May 8, 2023	

=== Commentators ===
Commentators	Dates	Notes
Joe Galli, Austin Idol, and Velvet Sky	January 8, 2022 – January 29, 2022; February 12, 2022 – February 19, 2022; March 12, 2022	
Joe Galli, Raven, and Velvet Sky	February 5, 2022	Raven briefly filled in for Idol
Joe Galli, Tim Storm, and Velvet Sky	February 26, 2022 – March 5, 2022; June 18, 2022 – September 2, 2023	Storm briefly filled in for Idol
Joe Galli and Velvet Sky	March 26, 2022 – May 7, 2022	
Joe Galli, Madusa, and Velvet Sky	May 14, 2022	Madusa briefly filled in for Idol
Joe Galli, William Patrick Corgan, and Velvet Sky	May 21, 2022	
Joe Galli, Tim Storm, and Tyrus	May 28, 2022	Tyrus briefly filled in for Sky
Joe Galli, Tim Storm, and Madusa	June 4, 2022	Madusa briefly filled in for Sky
Kyle Davis, Danny Dealz, and Candy	March 11, 2023	All three filled in for Joe Galli, Tim Storm, and Velvet Sky
Joe Galli, Tim Storm, and Danny Dealz	April 15, 2023 – May 1, 2023	
Joe Galli, Tim Storm, Velvet Sky, and Trevor Murdoch	July 4, 2023	
Joe Galli	August 12, 2023	
Joe Galli, Kyle Davis, and Val Capone	August 19, 2023	

=== Ring announcers ===
Ring announcers	Dates	Notes
Kyle Davis	January 8, 2022 – May 8, 2023	Also an interviewer.

=== Backstage interviewers ===
Backstage interviewers	Dates	Notes
Kyle Davis	January 8, 2022 – May 8, 2023	Also a ring announcer
May Valentine	January 8, 2022 – May 8, 2023	

== See also ==
- NWA Powerrr
- List of professional wrestling television series
