= Max the Impaler =

American professional wrestler

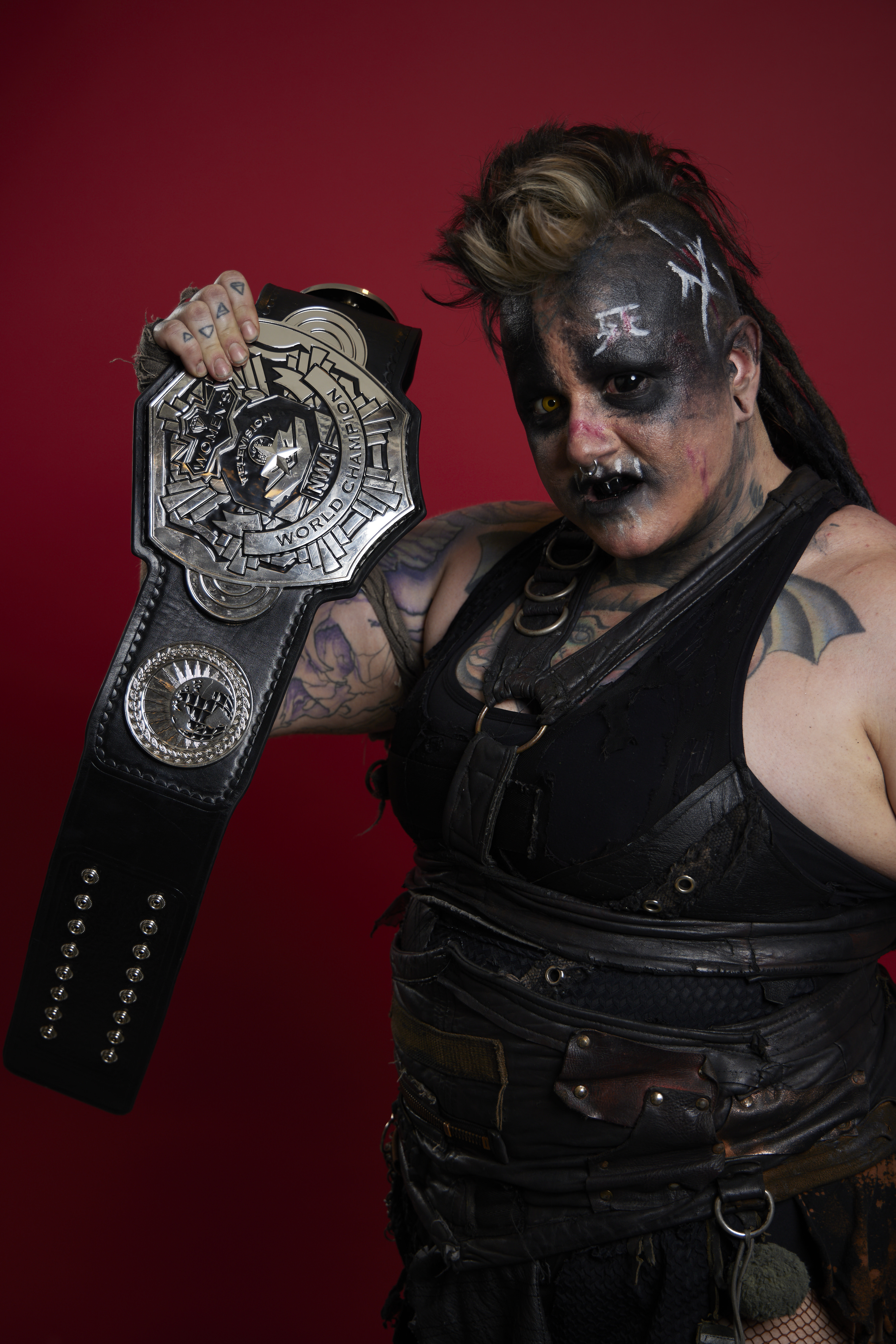
- Max the Impaler in 2023

Professional wrestling career
- Ring names: Max; Max Lindsey; Max the Impaler
- Billed height: 5 ft 10 in (1.78 m)
- Billed weight: 240 lb (110 kg)
- Billed from: The Wasteland
- Trained by: Ohio Pro Wrestling Academy
- Debut: December 15, 2018

Max Lindsey, better known by their (Note: Lindsey uses they/them pronouns.) ring name Max the Impaler, is an American professional wrestler. They are known for their tenure in the National Wrestling Alliance (NWA), where they are a former one-time NWA World Women's Television Champion and a former one-time NWA World Television Champion. They also make appearances for Tokyo Joshi Pro-Wrestling (TJPW), where they have previously held the Princess Tag Team Championship and the International Princess Championship.

== Professional wrestling career ==
=== Early career (2018–2020) ===
Max made their in-ring debut on December 15, 2018. They won the IWA Mid-South Women's Championship twice in the first half of 2019. On February 22, 2020, Max appeared on the pre-show of Impact Wrestling's Sacrifice, defeating Cali Young.

=== Ring of Honor (2021) ===
In August 2021, Max entered the ROH Women's World Championship tournament, defeating Holidead in the first round. In the following round, however, they lost to Angelina Love by disqualification.

=== National Wrestling Alliance (2022–present) ===
Max made their National Wrestling Alliance (NWA) debut on the May 24, 2022 episode of NWA Powerrr, defeating Ella Envy. On August 27, at night 1 of the NWA 74th Anniversary Show, they won the Burke Invitational gauntlet match, which earned them the right to face Kamille for NWA World Women's Championship match on night 2. However, Kamille successfully defended their title. On November 12, at NWA Hard Times 3, Max defeated Natalia Markova in a casket match.

On the February 14, 2023 episode of Powerrr, with the announcement of NWA 312, it was announced that the NWA Women's Television Championship tournament would be held to determine the inaugural champion, with the finals set to take place at the event. On the March 21 episode of Powerrr, Max defeated Taya Valkyrie to reach the final. On April 7, at NWA 312, however, Max lost to Kenzie Paige in the tournament final.

On August 26, 2023, night one of the NWA 75th Anniversary Show, Max defeated Kenzie Paige to win the NWA World Women's Television Championship. On night two, Max retained the title by successfully defending against Ruthie Jay. On the February 13, 2024 episode of Powerrr, Max defeated Mims to win the NWA World Television Championship, unifying the NWA men's and women's world television titles in the process.

=== Tokyo Joshi Pro-Wrestling (2022–present) ===
On January 4, 2023, at Tokyo Joshi Pro-Wrestling Tokyo Joshi Pro '23, Max and Heidi Howitzer won the Princess Tag Team Championship, defeating Saki Akai and Yuki Arai. They lost the titles to 121000000 (Maki Itoh and Miyu Yamashita) on March 18, at Grand Princess '23. On October 9, at Wrestle Princess IV, Max defeated Rika Tatsumi to win the International Princess Championship, in a Winner-takes-all match, in where Max defended their NWA World Women's Television Championship.

== Acting career ==
Max is featured in the horror film Dolly as the titular creature.

== Personal life ==
Max is non-binary and transmasculine and uses they/them pronouns.

== Championships and accomplishments ==
- H20 Wrestling
  - H20 Women's Championship (1 time)
- IWA Mid-South
  - IWA Mid-South Women's Championship (2 times)
- National Wrestling Alliance
  - NWA World Television Championship (1 time)
  - NWA World Women's Television Championship (1 time)
  - Burke Invitational Gauntlet (2022)
- New South Pro Wrestling
  - New South Tag Team Championship (1 time) – with Heidi Howitzer
- Ohio Valley Wrestling
  - OVW Women's Championship (1 time)
- Pro Wrestling Illustrated
  - Ranked No. 100 of the top 100 female wrestlers in the PWI Women's 100 in 2020
  - Ranked No. 54 of the top 500 singles wrestlers in the PWI 500 in 2024
- Pro Wrestling ZERO1 USA
  - ZERO1 USA Women's Championship (1 time)
- Tokyo Joshi Pro-Wrestling
  - International Princess Championship (1 time)
  - Princess Tag Team Championship (1 time) – with Heidi Howitzer

== Filmography ==
Year	Title	Role	Notes
2025	Dolly	Dolly	
