= Jack Talos =

American wrestler, basketball player, and actor

Personal information
- Born: Zechariah Smith; June 17, 1991 (age 35) McLoud, Oklahoma, US

Professional wrestling career
- Ring name(s): Jack Talos; Zech Smith; Talos; The Towering; Painful Paul
- Billed height: 7 ft 0 in (213 cm)
- Billed weight: 310 lb (141 kg)
- Trained by: WWE Performance Center
- Debut: 2020

Zechariah Smith (born June 17, 1991), better known by his ring names Jack Talos, Painful Paul, or Zech Smith, is an American professional wrestler, former basketball player and actor, He currently wrestles for All Japan Pro Wrestling (AJPW) and Boca Raton Championship Wrestling (BRCW). He is best known for his time in WWE. Smith has made appearances on Impact Wrestling, the National Wrestling Alliance (NWA) and Coastal Championship Wrestling (CCW).

== Early life and education ==
Smith born and grew up in McLoud, Oklahoma. He got his early life education from Putnam City High School. Smith went to Morgan State College for higher education and joined college basketball team. Eventually, he became a professional basketball player and played against several teams at college level. Smith played two seasons for Howard College and was part of Oklahoma Magic AAU squad from 2006 to 2010. He also played for Harlem Globetrotters against The Washington Generals. Smith left basketball and later in 2020 he became involved in professional wrestling and made his debut at CCW's Untouchable event and defeated Bull Anderson.

== Career ==
=== WWE (2020–2022) ===
Smith was recruited by WWE Performance Center in 2020 as a developmental talent for their NXT brand. He was not involved in major televised shows produced by WWE but made an appearance in the 2020 WWE SmackDown event. He was released by WWE in 2021 along with Stephon Smith and Zanjeer.

=== NWA (2023–present) ===
After Smith was releases by WWE, He made his debut at NWA 312 Pre-Show for National Wrestling Alliance where he along with Daisy Kill were defeated by Mike Knox and Trevor Murdoch in a tag team match.

=== BRCW (2023–present) ===
Smith debuted at BRCW in early 2023 along with Frank The Clown. He appeared on a NWA Pop-Up Event with Daisy Kill for a tag team match against Bull James and Gangrel.

=== JCW Juggalo Championship Wrestling 2024-2025 ===
Smith wrestled as "Painful Paul" in JCW, and was in the faction: St Claire Monster Corporation, with Kongo Kong, Hurtful Kurt, Mr Happy, & faction manager, Jasmin StClaire.

== Championships and accomplishments ==
- All Japan Pro Wrestling
  - World Tag Team Championship (1 time) – with Ren Ayabe
  - World's Strongest Tag Determination League (2025) – Ren Ayabe
- Boca Raton Championship Wrestling
  - BRCW Heavyweight Championship (1 time)
- Empire Pro Wrestling
  - EPW Americas Championship (1 time)
- Horror Slam Wrestling
  - Horror Slam Tag Team Championship (1 time, current) - with Jeeves.
- National Wrestling Alliance
  - NWA United States Tag Team Championship (2 times) – with Daisy Kill
  - Crockett Cup (2026) – with Ren Ayabe
- Pro Wrestling Illustrated
  - Ranked No. 221 of the top singles wrestlers in the PWI 500 in 2026

== Filmography ==
| Year | Title | Role | Notes |
|---|---|---|---|
| 2020 | WWE Smackdown | Self | |
| 2022–2023 | Young Rock | Undertaker | TV Series |
| 2023 | Tik Tokers | Talos | TV Series |
| 2023 | NWA Powerrr | | |
