= Pollo Del Mar =

American drag queen

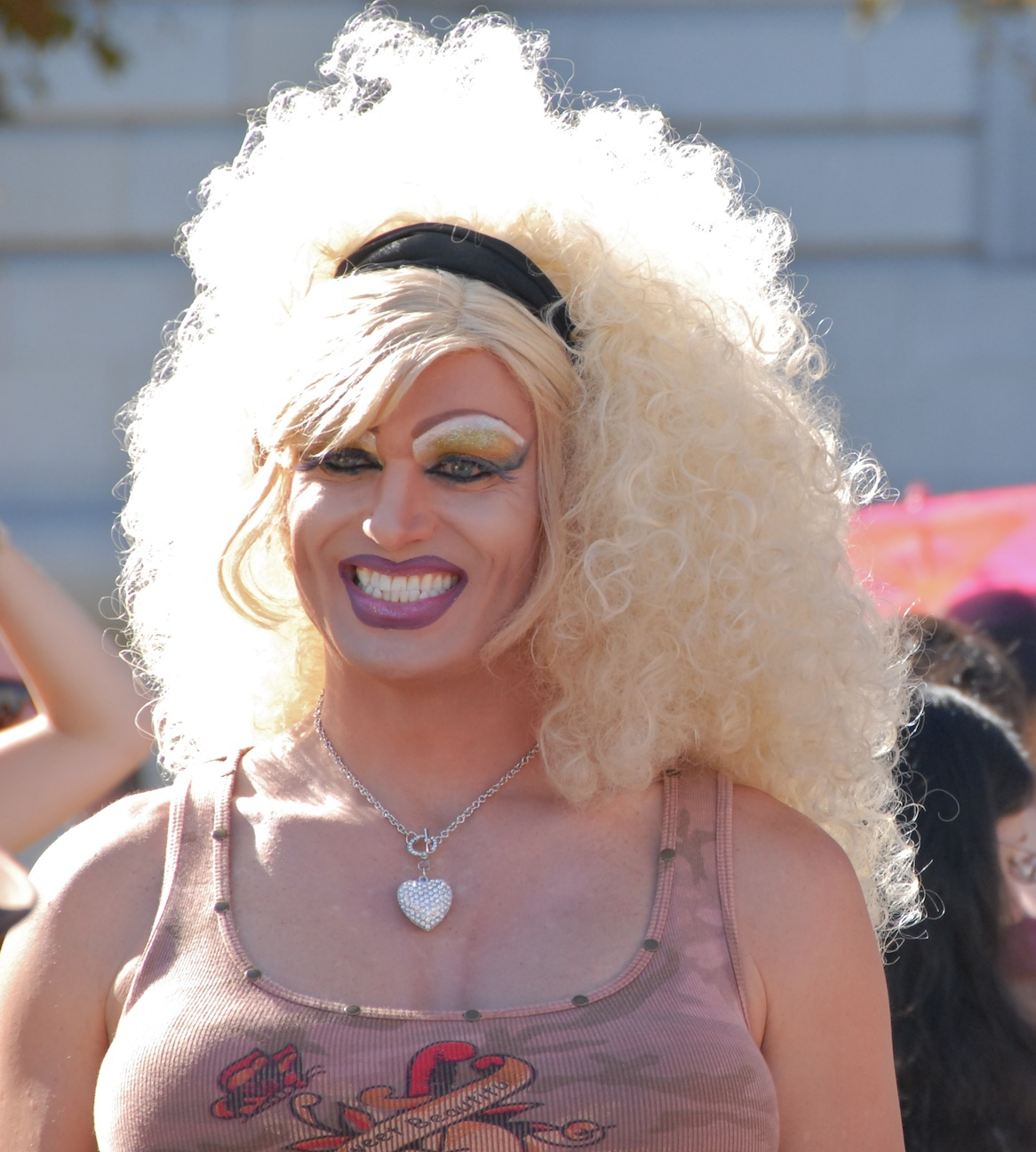
- Pollo Del Mar in 2008
- Born: Paul E. Pratt; United States
- Other names: The Manager of Champions, Pollo DelMar, The Notorious P.D.M, The Glamazon

Pollo Del Mar (Paul E. Pratt) is an American drag queen performer, pro wrestling personality, journalist, activist and recording artist.

As columnist, blogger and celebrity interviewer, Del Mar has hosted multiple podcasts and contributed to a wide array of print and online media outlets, both gay and straight.

To date, Del Mar has released five dance music singles "How Embarrassing" (2012), "Made You Look" (2013) with Billboard charting artist Kwanza Jones, "#WhiteLadyProblems" (2014), "Rule the World (A Woman's Got the Power)" (2016) and is featured on the song "Last Night," from the 2017 album Ban2oozle by Billboard Top 5 Dance Chart recording artist and openly gay rapper Jipsta. He is heavily featured in the music video "WannaBe," a cover of The Spice Girls by Billboard Dance chart-topping artist Neon Hitch.

Del Mar became a journalist via celebrity interviews on the cover of Northern California's GLOSS magazine (for which she is also a three-time cover girl), The San Francisco Bay Times and alternative weekly San Francisco Bay Guardian. She contributed celebrity-related content and interviews to The Huffington Post for over a half-decade. Presently Del Mar is a columnist and contributor to the professional wrestling magazine Pro Wrestling Illustrated.

Del Mar parlayed celebrity interviews into performances with several top stars and acting, appearing onstage with Katy Perry, Iggy Azalea, Lady Gaga, talk-show hosts Wendy Williams and Ross Mathews and opened for Britney Spears during the singer's appearance on Good Morning America. On Nov. 22, 2008, Del Mar and five others opened the inaugural YouTube Live Concert event with Katy Perry, who performed chart-topping single "Hot n Cold" for a global audience of millions. On Dec. 6, 2008, he performed with Grammy-winning singer Cyndi Lauper at the Energy 92.7 Anniversary Party. Del Mar performed stand-up comedy during a June 2018 sold-out series of San Francisco shows with Real Housewives of New York City star Countess Luann de Lesseps.

As an actor, Del Mar has appeared in independent feature films The Rise and Fall of Jeremy Starr and Devious, Inc., various television programs, has cameos in ABC mini-series When We Rise by Oscar-winning writer Dustin Lance Black, HBO series Looking and multiple seasons of National Wrestling Alliance series NWA Powerrr.

Del Mar made his first drag appearance April 27, 2006 at a fundraiser in San Francisco's Castro District. In August 2006, she placed first runner-up in the Miss Gay San Francisco Pageant and gained further attention as "Miss October" in the 2007 Desperate Divas calendar and a subsequent series of post cards.

Del Mar gained attention for her political efforts in the wake of California passing Prop 8, which would effectively ban gay marriage.

== Professional wrestling ==
As a journalist, Del Mar has long covered professional wrestling, first for Huffington Post then popular wrestling newsboard WrestleZone. Under his given name, Pratt's work published in the Oct. 2021 issue of industry-leading Pro Wrestling Illustrated Magazine.

In 2017, she began pursuing a life-long passion for sports entertainment personally. Del Mar joined San Francisco Bay Area-based promotion Wrestling for Charity., becoming a central personality in live events, acting as Co-General Manager of the company and assuming a behind-the-scenes role as head booker for WFC's San Francisco events.

In 2021, Del Mar's reputation as a pro wrestling personality expanded dramatically. She hosted Effy's "Big Gay Brunch" in Tampa, FL, for Game Changer Wrestling, returning for "Big Gay Brunch 2" in Chicago later that year. Del Mar has acted as host, manager and commentator on every "Big Gay Brunch" since.

== National Wrestling Alliance ==
Wrestling legend Mickie James selected Del Mar to accompany transgender grappler Jamie Senegal at the Aug. 28, 2022 National Wrestling Alliance all-women's pay-per-view EMPOWERRR.

Del Mar became a fixture on NWA programming the following year, making history as the first drag queen to appear on broadcast pro wrestling in the United States. Paired with "Thrillbilly" Silas Mason, they won audience attention while moving toward main event status through 2022-2023. They unsuccessfully feuded with Ethan Carter III for the NWA National Championship. Their onscreen romance imploded at NWA 75.

In March 2023, Pratt (Del Mar)'s contributions behind-the-scenes expanded with the launch of "NWA Official Wrestling," the company's online publication, for which he serves as Editor-in-Chief. Additionally, he has acted as a producer on two episodes of NWA docu-series "Ten Pounds of Gold" and two seasons of flagship broadcast NWA Powerrr.

== Awards ==
In Nov. 2021, OutSports announced nominees for its first-annual Queer Wrestling Index (QWI) Awards, with Del Mar receiving a total of five for work as a journalist and personality under both given and stage names. Readers of website OutSports and LGBT in the Ring Podcast audiences chose Del Mar "QWI Pro Wrestling Personality of the Year" four consecutive years between 2021-2024. In 2022, Del Mar also received the site's awards for "Best Look," its "Flowers Award" for overall social impact inside and outside pro wrestling and, under given name Paul E. Pratt, was named "Best Pro Wrestling Journalist." To date, Del Mar is a 16-time nominee and winner of seven awards.

Del Mar was afforded a one-page profile in the May 2022 issue of Pro Wrestling Illustrated.

She became the final Miss Trannyshack, was named "San Francisco's Most Notable Drag Queen" at the 2016 Nitey Awards and reigned as the 53rd Empress of San Francisco within the Imperial Council of San Francisco. She is the only performer to ever be crowned Trannyshack Star Search, Miss Trannyshack, Grand Duchess and Empress of San Francisco.

== Miss Trannyshack 2007 ==
On November 17, 2007, Del Mar was crowned "Miss Trannyshack 2007" in front of the largest audience in pageant history. Del Mar is the only performer to ever simultaneously hold the Miss Trannyshack and Miss Trannyshack Star Search titles, both representing the legendary nightclub run by drag impresario Heklina. Celebrity judges for the event included comedian Sandra Bernhard, New York City club kid-turned-author James St. James, drag personality and Midnight Mass producer Peaches Christ and more.
