= Natalia Markova =

Russian professional wrestler (born 1989)

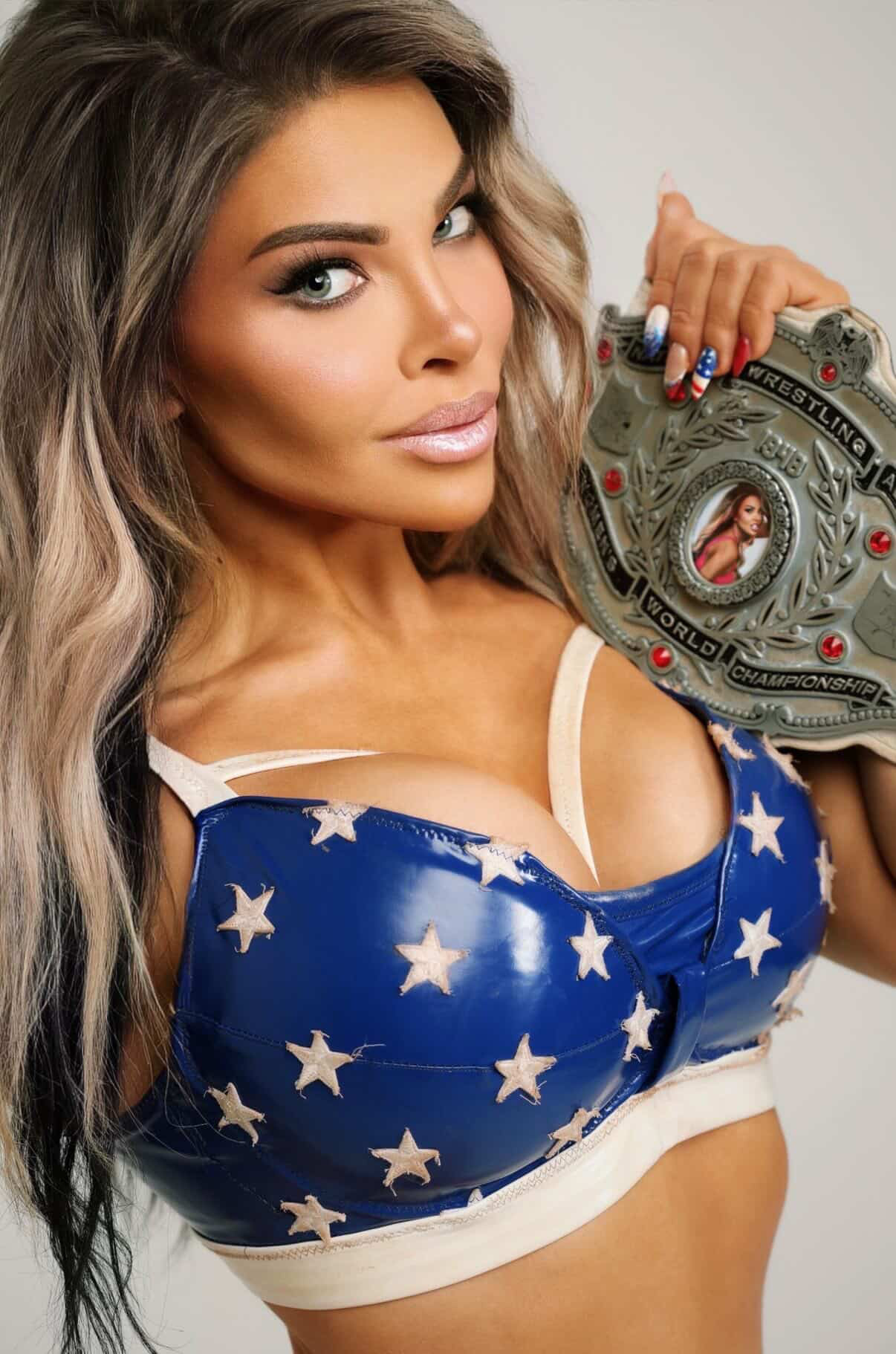
- Markova with NWA championship belt 2025

Personal information
- Born: 11 January 1989 (age 37) Moscow, Russian SFSR, Soviet Union

Professional wrestling career
- Ring name: Natalia Markova
- Billed height: 1.65 m (5 ft 5 in)
- Billed weight: 59 kg (130 lb)
- Billed from: Moscow, Russia
- Trained by: Vadim Koryagin; IWF Wrestling School
- Debut: 13 January 2007

Natalia Markova (Russian: Наталья Маркова; born 11 January 1989) is a Russian professional wrestler. She is signed to the National Wrestling Alliance (NWA), where she is a former one-time NWA World Women's Champion. She is also makes appearances on the independent circuit.

Markova began her career in 2007 with the Russian promotion Independent Wrestling Federation (NFR), where she performed until 2017. While at INR, she also toured Japan from 2011 to 2013, working mostly with DDT Pro-Wrestling and Wrestling New Classic.

Following a two-year hiatus, Markova resumed her career in 2016, debuting in North America the following year. She has since appeared mostly in independent promotions throughout the U.S., winning several championships.

== Professional wrestling career ==
=== Early Career (2007–2017) ===
Markova graduated from Independent Wrestling Federation (NFR) wrestling school in 2006 in Moscow; she made her debut on 13 January 2007 at Danger Zone #23 under the ring name "Bonnie" in a match against Lilith, which ended in a disqualification after Gothic interfered on Lilith's behalf.

On 24 June, at the Danger Zone show No. 28 in Luzhniki, Markova defeated Lilith, and thus became the champion of the NFR for the first time. On 30 September, she won the "Women's Battle Royale" and became a two-time champion. During her NFR career, Markova toured Japan, where she worked for DDT Pro-Wrestling and Wrestling New Classic from 2011 to 2013. She also worked in Europe, Asia and the Middle East.

Her last match with Independent Wrestling Federation was on 21 January 2017, when she her lost title to Ramona.

=== Shine Wrestling (2017–2021) ===
Markova made her Shine Wrestling debut on 14 July 2017 at SHINE 43, where she competed against Maria Maria, Brandi Lauren, Daisy, and Dementia D'Rose. She returned at SHINE 44 where she had a match against Shotzi Blackheart and Dementia D'Rose. On 29 June 2019 at Shine 59, she won her first title by defeating Avery Taylor to become ACW Women's Champion. At Shine 60, Markova competed for her first Shine title, unsuccessfully challenging Blackheart for the Shine Nova Championship. At Shine 64, she won the Shine Nova Championship by defeating Jenna, Avery Taylor, Double D Rose and Lindsey Snow.

Markova successfully defended title twice during Shine's live show on 18 January 2020, as well as at Shine 65 against contenders Jenna and Brandi Lauren. On 19 September 2021 at Shine 68, Markova lost the Nova Championship in a street fight against The Woad. On 14 November, Markova won the Shine Championship at WWN Supershow: Battle Of The Belts from Ivelisse. On 12 December at Shine 70, Ivelisse won the Shine Championship from Markova in a rematch.

=== Evolve (2019–2020) ===
Markova made her Evolve debut on 11 May 2019 at Evolve 128, losing to Shotzi Blackheart. She won her first singles match on 6 December at Evolve 141, defeating Camron Bra'Nae. Markova's last match took place on 1 March 2020 at Evolve 146, in which she teamed up with Avery Taylor to defeat Brandi Lauren and Jessi Kamea.

=== All Elite Wrestling (2021) ===
Markova made her All Elite Wrestling (AEW) debut on the 17 May episode of AEW Dark: Elevation in a match against Leyla Hirsch, which Markova lost. The following month, Markova competed in her second match on the 8 June episode of AEW Dark, losing to Tay Conti. She had her third and final match on the 6 July episode of AEW Dark, losing to Abadon.

=== National Wrestling Alliance (2021–present) ===
After appearing in two matches during the NWA USA tapings on 3 December 2021, Markova made her official debut for the National Wrestling Alliance (NWA). Markova appeared on the NWA Hard Times 2 pre-show teaming with Missa Kate against Jennacide and Paola Blaze, Kylie Rae and Tootie Lynn, and the defending NWA World Women's Tag Team Champions The Hex (Allysin Kay and Marti Belle).

On 28 August 2022, at the second night of NWA 74, Markova became the inaugural Queen Bee. On 12 November, at NWA Hard Times 3, Markova had lost to Max the Impaler in a casket match.

On August 16, 2025 at NWA 77th Anniversary Show, Markova defeated Kenzie Paige to win the NWA World Women's Championship. On the May 16, 2026 episode of NWA Powerrr, Tiffany Nieves won the NWA World Women's Championship from Markova.

== Personal life ==
In the summer of 2022, Markova was featured in media reports. Along with professional wrestler Bryan Idol, they were able to locate and apprehend the person who stole her purse on a flight to Tampa. They were able to locate the criminal by using the geolocation feature to find the AirPods she had in her purse.

== Championships and accomplishments ==
- American Combat Wrestling
  - ACW Women's Championship (1 time)
- Chris Jericho's Rock 'N' Wrestling Rager at Sea
  - Jericho Cruise Women's Oceanic Championship (1 time, inaugural)
  - Jericho Cruise Women's Oceanic Championship Tournament (2025)
- Collective League Of Adrenaline Strength And Honor
  - CLASH Women's Championship (1 time)
- House of Glory
  - HOG Women's Championship (1 time)
  - HOG Women's Title Tournament (2022)
- Independent Wrestling Federation
  - IWF Women's Championship (6 times)
- National Wrestling Alliance
  - Burke Invitational Gauntlet Winner (2024)
  - Queen Bee (2022)
  - NWA World Women's Championship (1 time)
  - NWA Year End Awards
    - Wrestler of the Year (Women) (2025)
- Pro Wrestling Illustrated
  - Ranked No. 60 of the top 250 female wrestlers in the PWI Women's 250 in 2025
- Shine Wrestling
  - Shine Championship (1 time)
  - Shine Nova Championship (1 time)
- Women's Wrestling Hall of Fame
  - WWHOF Award (1 time)
    - Pro Wrestler of the Year (2024)
- World Wrestling Council
  - WWC Women's Championship (1 time)
