= NWA United States Tag Team Championship (Lightning One version) =

Men's professional wrestling championship

Details
- Promotion: National Wrestling Alliance
- Date established: August 28, 2022
- Current champions: The Hardway (Jack Vaughn and Dalton McKenzie)
- Date won: June 6, 2026 (aired August 1, 2026)
Statistics
- First champions: The Fixers (Jay Bradley and Wrecking Ball Legursky)
- Most reigns: As tag team (2 reigns): Daisy Kill and Talos; As Individual (2 reigns): AJ Cazana
- Longest reign: The Slimeballz (Sage Chantz and Tommy Rant) (274 days)
- Shortest reign: Daisy Kill and Talos (1st reign, 62 days)
- Oldest champion: Jay Bradley (41 years, 284 days)
- Youngest champion: KC Cazana (20 years, 296 days)
- Heaviest champion: The Fixers, L.L.C. (Jay Bradley and Wrecking Ball Legursky) (634 lbs combined)
- Lightest champion: Kerry Morton (191 lbs)

The NWA United States Tag Team Championship is a professional wrestling tag team championship contested in the National Wrestling Alliance. This version is the eleventh version of the championship. The current champions are The Hardway (Jack Vaughn and Dalton McKenzie). They won the titles by defeating previous champions The Slimeballz (Sage Chantz and Tommy Rant) at NWA Hard Times 6 on June 6, 2026 in Atlanta, Georgia.

On July 19, 2022, the NWA announced that the United States Tag Team Championship would be revived after five years of inactivity, and new champions would be determined in a 12 team battle royal on Night 2 of NWA 74. All participants except for the final team were announced on NWA programming (Powerrr and USA) in the weeks leading up to NWA 74. The final team was revealed after the first eleven teams had entered the ring for the match.

== Belt design ==
The original belts have a similar design to a version of the titles from Championship Wrestling from Florida. On the October 29, 2022 edition of NWA USA, NWA President Billy Corgan unveiled new belts, bearing a similar design of the Detroit version of the NWA United States Heavyweight Championship. But The Fixers' Wrecking Ball Legursky refused to swap the title belts with Corgan. On January 31, 2023, when the Fixers were defeated by The Country Gentleman for the championship, the title belts were finally swapped out.

== Reigns ==
As of October 13, 2026, there have been nine reigns between eight different teams, and fifteen wrestlers, with one vacancy. The Fixers (Jay Bradley and Wrecking Ball Legursky) were the inaugural champions. The Slimeballz (Sage Chantz and Tommy Rant) have the longest reign at 274 days, while Daisy Kill and Talos' first reign is the shortest at 62 days.

The current champions are The Hardway (Jack Vaughn and Dalton McKenzie). They won the titles by defeating previous champions The Slimeballz (Sage Chantz and Tommy Rant) at Hard Times 6 on June 6, 2026 in Atlanta, Georgia.

Key
No.	Overall reign number
Reign	Reign number for the specific team—reign numbers for the individuals are in parentheses, if different
Days	Number of days held

No.	Champion	Championship change			Reign statistics		Notes	Ref.
No.	Champion	Date	Event	Location	Reign	Days	Notes	Ref.
National Wrestling Alliance/Lightning One Inc.
1	The Fixers (Jay Bradley and Wrecking Ball Legursky)	August 28, 2022	74th Anniversary Show; Night 2	St. Louis, MO	1	156	This match was a battle royal involving 12 teams to determine the inaugural champions.	
2	The Country Gentlemen (AJ Cazana and Anthony Andrews)	January 31, 2023	Powerrr	Knoxville, TN	1	208		
3	Daisy Kill and Talos	August 27, 2023	75th Anniversary Show; Night 2	St. Louis, MO	1	62		
4	The Immortals (JR Kratos and Odinson)	October 28, 2023	Samhain	Cleveland, OH	1	157		
—	Vacated	April 2, 2024	Hard Times 4	Dothan, AL	—	—	Aired on tape delay on April 16, 2024 as a special episode of NWA Powerrr. The Immortals (Odinson and Kratos) vacated the titles in order to challenge for the NWA World Tag Team Championship at the aforementioned Hard Times event.	
5	Daisy Kill and Talos	April 13, 2024	Powerrr	Tampa, FL	2	140	Defeated The Fixers, L.L.C. (Jay Bradley and Wrecking Ball Legursky) in a tournament final to win the vacant titles. Aired on tape delay on July 30, 2024.	
6	The Country Gentlemen (AJ Cazana and KC Cazana)	August 31, 2024	76th Anniversary Show	Philadelphia, PA	1 (2, 1)	203	This was a four-way tag team match also involving The Fixers, L.L.C. (Jay Bradley and Wrecking Ball Legursky) and The Slimeballz (Sage Chantz and Tommy Rant).	
7	The Southern Six (Alex Taylor and Kerry Morton)	March 22, 2025	Hard Times V	Dothan, Alabama	1	171	Aired on tape delay on June 24, 2025.	
8	The Slimeballz (Sage Chantz and Tommy Rant)	September 5, 2025	NWA Powerrr	Tampa, Florida	1	274	Aired on tape delay on December 16, 2025. This was a handicap match as co-champion Alex Taylor was not medically cleared to compete.	
9	The Hardway (Jack Vaughn and Dalton McKenzie)	June 6, 2026	Hard Times 6	Atlanta, Georgia	1	129+	Aired on tape delay on August 1, 2026 as a special episode of Powerrr.	

== Combined reigns ==
As of October 13, 2026.

†	Indicates the current champions
¤	The exact length of at least one title reign is uncertain; the combined length may not be correct.

=== By team ===
Rank	Team	No. of reigns	Combined days
1	The Slimeballz (Sage Chantz and Tommy Rant)	1	274
2	The Country Gentlemen (AJ Cazana and Anthony Andrews)	1	208
3	The Country Gentlemen (AJ Cazana and KC Cazana)	1	203
4	Daisy Kill and Talos	2	202
5	The Southern Six (Alex Taylor and Kerry Morton)	1	171
6	The Immortals (JR Kratos and Odinson)	1	157
7	The Fixers (Jay Bradley and Wrecking Ball Legursky)	1	156
8	The Hardway † (Jack Vaughn and Dalton McKenzie)	1	129+

=== Individual ===
Rank	Team	No. of reigns	Combined days
1	AJ Cazana	2	411
2	Sage Chantz	1	274
2	Tommy Rant	1	274
4	Anthony Andrews	1	208
5	KC Cazana	1	203
6	Daisy Kill	2	202
6	Talos	2	202
8	Alex Taylor	1	171
8	Kerry Morton	1	171
10	JR Kratos	1	157
10	Odinson	1	157
12	Jay Bradley	1	156
12	Wrecking Ball Legursky	1	156
14	Dalton McKenzie †	1	129+
14	Jack Vaughn †	1	129+

== See also ==
- List of National Wrestling Alliance championships
- NWA World Tag Team Championship
- List of NWA World Tag Team Champions
