= List of current champions in the National Wrestling Alliance =

The National Wrestling Alliance (NWA) is an American professional wrestling promotion operating via its parent company Lightning One, Inc. Title reigns are either determined by professional wrestling matches or are awarded to a wrestler, as a result of the culmination of various scripted storylines, following is correct as of November 9, 2026.

The promotion currently has nine championships - four men's singles titles, two men's tag team championships, two women's singles titles and a women's tag team championship. The list includes the number of times the wrestler has held the title, the date and location of the win, and a description of the winning bout.

== Overview ==
=== Men ===
At the top of the National Wrestling Alliance's championship hierarchy is the NWA World's Heavyweight Championship.

The secondary title is the NWA National Heavyweight Championship.

Tertiary titles include the NWA World Television Championship and NWA Mid-America Heavyweight Championship.

The NWA World Junior Heavyweight Championship is for wrestlers 220 lbs. and under.

The primary tag team title is the NWA World Tag Team Championship, with the NWA United States Tag Team Championship serving as the secondary title.

=== Women ===
The top singles championship specifically contested for female wrestlers is the NWA World Women's Championship, with the NWA World Women's Television Championship serving as the secondary title

The championship for female tag teams is the NWA World Women's Tag Team Championship.

== Current champions ==
=== Men's division ===
Singles

Championship	Current champion(s)	Reign	Date won	Days held	Location	Notes	Ref.
NWA World's Heavyweight Championship	Silas Mason	1	August 16, 2025	450+	Huntington, New York	Defeated Thom Latimer at NWA 77. Aired on tape delay on November 18, 2025 as a special episode of NWA Powerrr.	
NWA National Heavyweight Championship	Bryan Idol	1	June 6, 2026	156+	Atlanta, Georgia	Defeated Mike Mondo at Hard Times 6. Aired on tape delay on August 15, 2026, as a special episode of Powerrr	
NWA Mid-America Heavyweight Championship	Jeremiah Plunkett	1	June 1, 2024	891+	Knoxville, Tennessee	Defeated Dante Casanova, Hunter Drake, and Mario Parua in a four-way elimination match to win the re-introduced title at NWA Back to the Territories. Aired at NWA Powerrr on tape delay on September 3, 2024.	
NWA World Junior Heavyweight Championship	Hayden Backlund	1	July 25, 2026	107+	Philadelphia, Pennsylvania	Won the vacant title by defeated Damian Fenrir, Axton Ray and Richard Adonis in a four-way match at NWA 78. Aired on tape delay on August 29, 2026, as a special episode of Powerrr.	
NWA World Television Championship	Mzry	1	April 25, 2026	198+	Tampa, Florida	Won the vacant title by defeating Daisy Kill, Wrecking Ball Legursky, Lockjaw Drake, and JAC in a five-way match during the NWA Powerrr tapings. Aired on tape delay on June 6, 2026. Previous champion Bryan Idol voluntarily vacated the championship to invoke the "Lucky Seven Rule" and challenge for the NWA World's Heavyweight Championship.	

Tag team

Championship	Current champion(s)	Reign	Date won	Days held	Location	Notes	Ref.
NWA World Tag Team Championship	The Country Gentlemen (AJ Cazana and KC Cazana)	1	April 25, 2026	198+	Tampa, Florida	Defeated The Immortals (Kratos and Odinson) on NWA Powerrr. Aired on tape delay on May 30, 2026.	
NWA United States Tag Team Championship	The Hardway (Jack Vaughn and Dalton McKenzie)	1	June 6, 2026	156+	Atlanta, Georgia	Defeated The Slimeballz (Sage Chantz and Tommy Rant) at Hard Times 6 Aired on tape delay on August 1, 2026 as a special episode of Powerrr.	

=== Women's division ===
Singles

Championship	Current champion(s)	Reign	Date won	Days held	Location	Notes	Ref.
NWA World Women's Championship	Tiffany Nieves	1	April 4, 2026	219+	Forney, Texas	Defeated Natalia Markova at the Crockett Cup; This was Nieves' Burke Invitational Gauntlet cash-in match Aired on tape delay May 16, 2026 as a special episode of NWA Powerrr	
NWA World Women's Television Championship	Sirena Veil	1	July 25, 2026	107+	Philadelphia, Pennsylvania	Defeated Gisele Shaw at NWA 78; Airing on tape delay on September 12, 2026, as a special episode of NWA Powerrr.	

Tag team

Championship	Current champion(s)	Reign	Date won	Days held	Location	Notes	Ref.
NWA World Women's Tag Team Championship	Liviyah and Mackenzie Morgan	1	August 22, 2026	79+	Tampa, Florida	Defeated Pretty Empowered (Kenzie Paige and Kylie Paige) in a two out of three falls match on NWA Powerrr; Aired on tape delay on October 31, 2026.	

== See also ==
- List of National Wrestling Alliance championships
- List of National Wrestling Alliance territories

Champions in NWA lists

- List of NWA World Heavyweight Champions
- List of NWA World Women's Tag Team Champions
- List of NWA World Tag Team Champions
- List of WWE United States Champions
