= NWA 78th Anniversary Show =

2026 National Wrestling Alliance professional wrestling show

NWA 78
- Promotional poster
- Promotion: National Wrestling Alliance
- Date: July 25, 2026 (aired August 29, 2026; September 5, 2026; September 12, 2026; September 19, 2026; September 26, 2026)
- City: Philadelphia, Pennsylvania
- Venue: 2300 Arena

Supercard chronology
← Previous; Hard Times 6	Next → EmPowerrr

NWA Anniversary Show chronology
← Previous; 77th	Next → —

The NWA 78th Anniversary Show (also simply called NWA 78) was a professional wrestling event produced by the National Wrestling Alliance (NWA). It was the 16th event in the NWA Anniversary Show chronology. The event took place on July 25, 2026, at the 2300 Arena in Philadelphia, Pennsylvania, marking the second time in three years that the event has been held in the venue. It aired on tape delay across several episodes of NWA Powerrr simultaneously on Comet and Charge!.

== Production ==
=== Background ===
The NWA Anniversary Show is a professional wrestling event held by the National Wrestling Alliance (NWA). The first event was held in 1998 to celebrate the 50th anniversary of the NWA's founding in 1948. The event then continued to be held annually until 2005. It has later been held periodically, with shows in 2008 and 2018, before becoming a regular yearly event starting in 2021.

On May 8, 2026, the NWA announced that the NWA 78th Anniversary Show would take place on July 25, 2026, at the 2300 Arena in Philadelphia, Pennsylvania. This would be the second time in three years that the NWA Anniversary Show took place in the venue.

=== Storylines ===
The event featured professional wrestling matches that involve different wrestlers from pre-existing scripted feuds and storylines. Wrestlers portray heroes, villains, or less distinguishable characters in scripted events that built tension and culminate in a wrestling match or series of matches. Storylines were played out on the twenty-seventh season of the NWA's weekly series, Powerrr.

At the Crockett Cup, Natalia Markova retained the NWA World Women's Championship against Sirena Veil. However, she was immediately attacked by TV-MA's Gretta, allowing Markova's longtime rival Tiffany Nieves to invoke her Burke Invitational Gauntlet title opportunity – something she had won earlier that night – and capture the championship. Now looking for revenge, the NWA announced on June 22 that Markova would face Gretta at the NWA 78th Anniversary Show.

For over three months, Daisy Kill had been feuding with Eric Smalls, which began after Smalls defeated Kill in a humiliating fashion at the December 13, 2025 taping of NWA Powerrr. Kill has repeatedly tried to get back at Smalls ever since, only to be humiliated every time. Two months later at the February 21 taping, Kill defeated Smalls in a Lethal Ladder match where a Shanghai pain stick was suspended above the ring. Smalls was the one to retrieve the weapon first, but Kill would hit a low blow on Smalls to win the match. At the Crockett Cup, Smalls would defeat Kill in a Kiss My Boots match; while he technically adhered to the stipulation afterward, Kill would then hit Smalls with another low blow. After not much interaction between the two, aside from a post-match incident on the June 6 episode of NWA Powerrr where Smalls stole Kill's jacket, the former would hold an open challenge two weeks later, where he was soundly beaten by Big Cuzzo. Kill would later come out and take his jacket back, revealing he hired Big Cuzzo to finish Smalls off once and for all. On June 29, the NWA announced that Kill and Smalls would face off one more time at the 78th Anniversary Show in a dog collar match.

== Results ==
Dark matches
No.	Results	Stipulations
1	Cristiano Argento defeated Jarett Diaz	Singles match
2	Alvin Alvarez defeated Chase Emery	Singles match
3	Ty Awesome defeated The Rockstar	Singles match
4	Shawn Carlson defeated Gentleman Jervis	Singles match
5	GKM and Joey Martinez defeated The BackSeat Boyz (JP Grayson and Tommy Grayson)	Tag team match
6	The McCord Collection (Bonez and Gilroy) (with Brandon McCord) defeated GKM and Joey Martinez	Tag team match

First episode (aired August 29, 2026)
No.	Results	Stipulations	Times
1	Sirena Veil and Alice Crowley (with Paige Collett) defeated Liviyah and Corrine Joy by pinfall	Tag team match	3:51
2	Mzry (c) vs. El Dragón Nihan ended in a time limit draw	Singles match for the NWA World Television Championship	6:05
3	Hayden Backlund defeated Axton Ray, Damian Fenrir and Richard Adonis by pinfall	Four-way match for the vacant NWA World Junior Heavyweight Championship	4:37
4	Kerry Morton defeated Colby Corino by pinfall	Singles match	7:53
(c) / – the champion(s) heading into the match

Second episode (aired September 5, 2026)
No.	Results	Stipulations	Times
1	The Hardway (Jack Vaughn and Dalton McKenzie) (c) defeated Jack Valor and Eddie Grayson by pinfall	Tag team match for the NWA United States Tag Team Championship	3:41
2	Daisy Kill (with Big Cuzzo) defeated Eric Smalls by touching the four corners	Dog Collar match Big Cuzzo was handcuffed to the ringpost.	4:28
3	Thom Latimer and Hammerstone defeated Da Pope and Mims by pinfall	Tag team match	5:58
4	Tiffany Nieves (c) (with Miss Starr and Shevar Amor) defeated Gretta and Natalia Markova by pinfall	Three-way match for the NWA World Women's Championship	6:31
(c) / – the champion(s) heading into the match

Third episode (aired September 12, 2026)
No.	Results	Stipulations
1	Sirena Veil (with Paige Collett) defeated Gisele Shaw (c) (with Lou D'Angeli) by pinfall	Singles match for the NWA World Women's Television Championship
2	Bryan Idol (c) defeated Spencer Slade and Mike Mondo by retrieving the belt	Three-way ladder match for the NWA National Heavyweight Championship
3	The Royal Court (King Trevor Murdoch I, Sir Michael, Duke of Knox, Squire Franks, and Jacob the Necromancer) defeated The Kingdom of Slimedom (Sage Chantz, Tommy Rant, Buster, and Lockjaw Drake)	Knights of the Round Table match
(c) / – the champion(s) heading into the match

Fourth episode (aired September 19, 2026)
No.	Results	Stipulations	Times
1	The Country Gentlemen (AJ Cazana and KC Cazana) (c) (with Joe Cazana) defeated Blunt Force Trauma (Carnage and Damage) by pinfall	Tag team match for the NWA World Tag Team Championship	6:02
2	Heath defeated Pretty Boy Smooth (with Pastor C-Lo), Effy, Kratos, and Talos by pinfall	Five-way match to determine the #1 contender to the NWA World's Heavyweight Championship	8:02
3	Alex Taylor defeated Ricky Morton (with Kerry Morton) by pinfall	Texas Deathmatch	5:15
(c) / – the champion(s) heading into the match

Fifth episode (aired September 26, 2026)
No.	Results	Stipulations	Times
1	Nattie Neidhart defeated Kenzie Paige and Kylie Paige by submission	Three-way match	10:43
2	"Thrillbilly" Silas Mason (c) defeated Carson Drake (with Aron Stevens) by referee stoppage	Singles match for the NWA World's Heavyweight Championship	8:40
(c) / – the champion(s) heading into the match

== See also ==
- 2026 in professional wrestling
