= NWA 77th Anniversary Show =

2025 National Wrestling Alliance event

NWA 77
- Promotional poster featuring various NWA wrestlers
- Promotion: National Wrestling Alliance
- Date: August 16, 2025 (aired October 21, 2025, October 28, 2025, November 4, 2025, November 11, 2025, November 18, 2025)
- City: Huntington, New York
- Venue: The Paramount

Supercard chronology
← Previous; Crockett Cup	Next → Samhain: Part 3

NWA Anniversary Show chronology
← Previous; 76th	Next → 78th

The NWA 77th Anniversary Show (also simply called NWA 77) was a professional wrestling event produced by the National Wrestling Alliance (NWA). It was the 15th event under the NWA Anniversary Show chronology. It took place on August 16, 2025, at The Paramount in Huntington, New York, and aired on tape delay across five episodes of NWA Powerrr on The Roku Channel.

== Production ==
=== Background ===
The NWA Anniversary Show is a professional wrestling event held by the National Wrestling Alliance (NWA). The first event was held in 1998 to celebrate the 50th anniversary of the 1948 founding of the NWA. The event then continued to be held annually until 2005. It has since been held periodically, with shows held in 2008, 2018, 2021, 2022, 2023, and 2024.

On June 16, 2025, it was announced that the NWA 77th Anniversary Show would take place on August 16, 2025, at The Paramount in Huntington, New York.

=== Storylines ===
The event featured professional wrestling matches that involve different wrestlers from pre-existing scripted feuds and storylines. Wrestlers portray heroes, villains, or less distinguishable characters in scripted events that built tension and culminate in a wrestling match or series of matches. Storylines were played out on the twenty-fourth season of the NWA's weekly series, Powerrr.

== Results ==
Dark matches
No.	Results	Stipulations
1	Danger Ross defeated Sodapop Hendrix by pinfall	Singles match
2	Donny Dixon defeated The Rockstar by pinfall	Singles match

First episode (aired October 21, 2025)
No.	Results	Stipulations	Times
1	Alex Taylor (c) defeated Rich Swann by pinfall	Singles match for the NWA World Junior Heavyweight Championship	8:16
2	The Colóns (Primo Colón and Epico Colón) defeated Blunt Force Trauma (Carnage and Damage) (with Aron Stevens), Nightmare Syn (Frank and Zyon) (with Austin Idol), and The Slimeballz (Sage Chantz and Tommy Rant) by pinfall	Four-way tag team elimination match to determine the #1 contenders to the NWA World Tag Team Championship	10:42
3	Bryan Idol (c) defeated Joe Ocasio by pinfall	Singles match for the NWA World Television Championship	9:49
(c) / – the champion(s) heading into the match

=== Four-way tag team elimination match ===
Eliminated	Wrestler	Team	Eliminated by	Method of elimination	Time
1	Zyon	Nightmare Syn	Damage	Pinned with a roll-up	1:39
2	Damage	Blunt Force Trauma	The Slimeballz	Pinned after Aron Stevens knocked out Damage with a loaded glove	3:13
3	Sage Chantz	The Slimeballz	Orlando Colón	Pinned after the Backstabber	10:42
Winners	The Colóns		—N/a		10:42

Second episode (aired October 28, 2025)
No.	Results	Stipulations	Times
1	Damian Fenrir defeated Luke Kurtis, Spencer Slade, and The Lost (Alex Misery, Crazzy Steve, and Lev) (with Gaagz the Gymp and Father James Mitchell) by pinfall	"King Bee" match to determine the #1 contender to the NWA World Junior Heavyweight Championship: Stage 1: Six-man tag team match (Fenrir, Kurtis, and Slade defeated The Lost); Stage 2: Three-way match (Fenrir pinned Kurtis to win)	11:25
2	Hammerstone defeated Kerry Morton by pinfall	Singles match	10:01
3	Aron Stevens and Carson Bartholomew Drake defeated The Holy Grail (EC3 and Pretty Boy Smooth) (with Pastor C-Lo) by pinfall	Tag team match	11:57

Third episode (aired November 4, 2025)
No.	Results	Stipulations	Times
1	Tiffany Nieves (c) (with Miss Starr) defeated Sirena Veil by submission	Singles match for the NWA World Women's Television Championship	5:26
2	Tyler Stevens won by last eliminating Lockjaw Drake	Austin Idol's Heartthrob Invitational Gauntlet to determine the #1 contender to the NWA National Heavyweight Championship	27:58
3	Mike Mondo (with Aron Stevens) defeated Mims (c) (with BLK Jeez) by pinfall	Singles match for the NWA National Heavyweight Championship	9:36
(c) / – the champion(s) heading into the match

=== Austin Idol's Heartthrob Invitational Gauntlet ===
Draw	Entrant	Eliminated by	Order	Method of Elimination	Eliminations
1	Jay Bradley	Wrecking Ball Legursky	6	Over the top rope	3
2	Tyler Stevens	Winner	—	—	2
3	Mario Pardua	Cristiano Argento	4	Pinfall	0
4	Izzy James	Jay Bradley	1	Pinfall	0
5	Wrecking Ball Legursky	Dante Casanova	9	Over the top rope	2
6	Jeremiah Plunkett	Camaro Jackson	2	Pinfall	0
7	Camaro Jackson	Jay Bradley	3	Pinfall	1
8	Cristiano Argento	Jay Bradley	5	Pinfall	1
9	Lockjaw Drake	Tyler Stevens	11	Pinfall	0
10	Frank Stone	Wrecking Ball Legursky	7	Pinfall	0
11	Dante Casanova	Tyler Stevens	10	Over the top rope	2
12	Charlie Adams	Dante Casanova	9	Pinfall	0

Fourth episode (aired November 11, 2025)
No.	Results	Stipulations	Times
1	Baron Von Storm defeated Daisy Kill (with Talos) by disqualification	No count-out match	5:28
2	Team NWA JCP (Bullwhip Ballard, Judy Lee Taylor, and The Country Gentlemen (AJ Cazana and KC Cazana)) (with Joe Cazana) defeated Team NWA Kross Fire (Tommy Henry, Kylie Paige, Hunter Drake, and Tyler Franks) by pinfall	No Limits eight-person tag team match	14:11
3	Natalia Markova defeated Kenzie Paige (c) by pinfall	Singles match for the NWA World Women's Championship	10:51
(c) / – the champion(s) heading into the match

Fifth episode (aired November 18, 2025)
No.	Results	Stipulations	Times
1	El Dragón Nihan defeated Max the Impaler by pinfall	Falls Count Anywhere Street Fight	7:26
2	The Immortals (Kratos and Odinson) defeated Knox and Murdoch (c) by pinfall	Tag team match for the NWA World Tag Team Championship	10:42
3	"Thrillbilly" Silas Mason defeated Thom Latimer (c) by pinfall	Singles match for the NWA Worlds Heavyweight Championship	12:08
(c) / – the champion(s) heading into the match

== See also ==
- 2025 in professional wrestling
