= NWA EmPowerrr =

2021 National Wrestling Alliance pay-per-view event

- Promotional poster featuring Kylie Rae, Kamille, Mickie James, and Jennacide
- Promotion: National Wrestling Alliance
- Date: August 28, 2021
- City: St. Louis, Missouri
- Venue: Chase's Khorassan Ballroom
- Attendance: ca. 900
- Buy rate: 3,500
- Tagline: NWA's First-Ever All-Women's Event

Pay-per-view chronology
← Previous; When Our Shadows Fall	Next → 73rd Anniversary Show

NWA EmPowerrr chronology
← Previous; First	Next → 2026

NWA EmPowerrr was a professional wrestling pay-per-view event produced by the National Wrestling Alliance (NWA) and held on August 28, 2021, as the first of two PPV events to take place from the Khorassan Ballroom of the Chase Park Plaza in St. Louis, Missouri. The event was broadcast on FITE TV, and was the NWA's first all-women's professional wrestling event, consisting solely of matches in their women's division. The card also featured wrestlers from partner promotions, such as All Elite Wrestling (AEW), Impact Wrestling, and Lucha Libre AAA Worldwide (AAA).

Nine matches were contested at the event, including two on the pre-show. The event crowned the reactivated NWA World Women's Tag Team Championship's first champions since 1984, with The Hex (Allysin Kay and Marti Belle) defeating Red Velvet and KiLynn King to win the titles. The main event saw Chelsea Green win the NWA Women's Invitational Cup Gauntlet to earn an NWA World Women's Championship match at the NWA 73rd Anniversary Show. In other prominent matches, Kamille defeated Leyla Hirsch to retain the NWA World Women's Championship, and Deonna Purrazzo defeated Melina Perez to retain the Impact Knockouts Championship.

== Production ==
=== Background ===
Other on-screen personnel
Role:	Name:
Commentators	Joe Galli
Commentators	Tim Storm
Commentators	Velvet Sky
Commentators	Brent Tarring
Commentators	Madusa
Commentators	Austin Idol (pre-show)

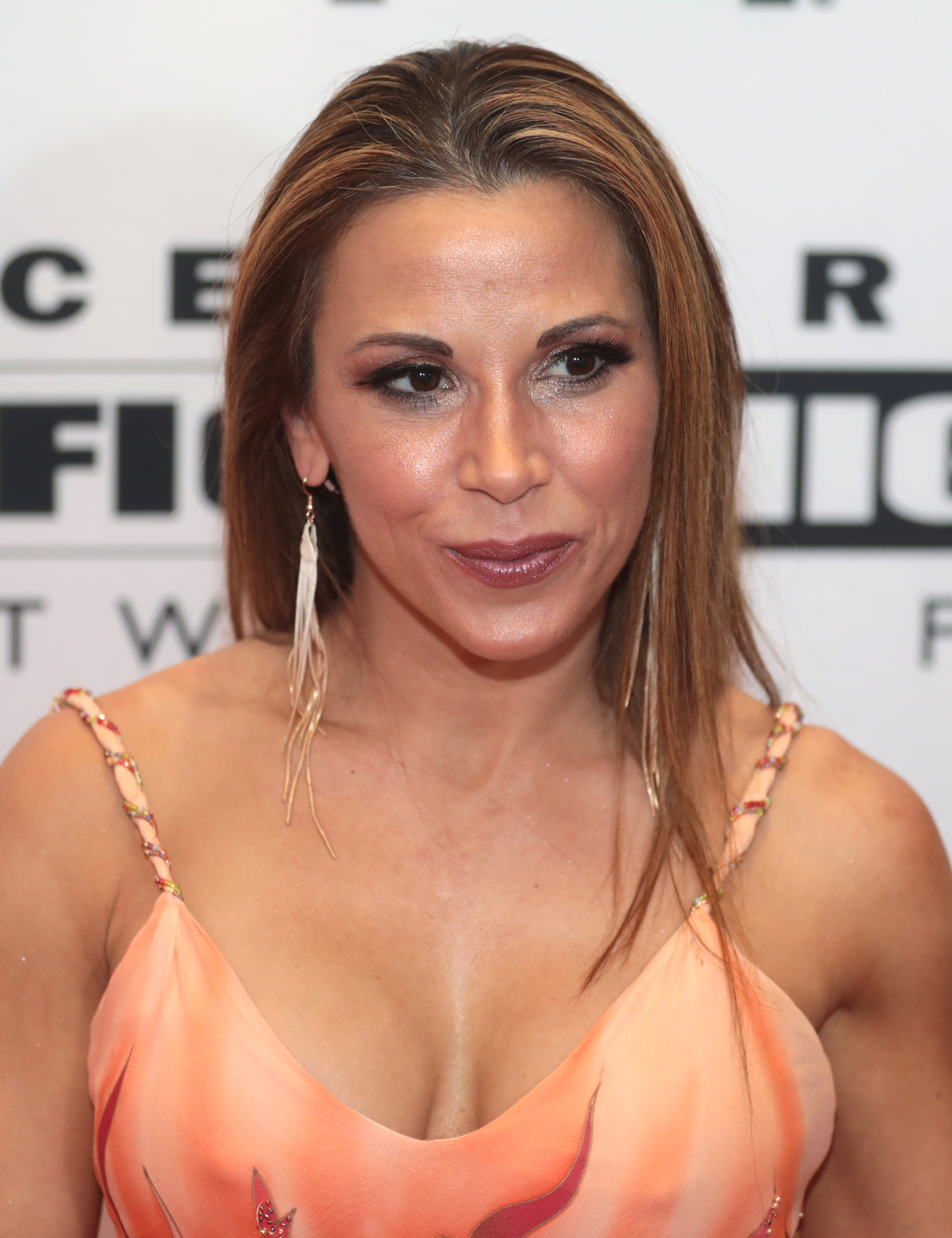
Executive producer of the show, Mickie James.

On the June 8, 2021, episode of NWA Power, National Wrestling Alliance (NWA) president Billy Corgan announced a four-day block of NWA programming from Saturday, August 28 to Tuesday, August 31, consisting of two pay-per-view (PPV) events broadcast exclusively on FITE TV, the second event being the NWA 73rd Anniversary Show, and two days of Power tapings. These events would emanate from the Khorassan Ballroom of the Chase Park Plaza in St. Louis, Missouri, making them the first to be held outside of the state of Georgia since the 2019 Crockett Cup. EmPowerrr was the Saturday PPV event, and was announced as the NWA's first-ever event to consist solely of women's matches. Veteran Mickie James was revealed as executive producer for the event. James stated that regardless of contractual issues, she wanted the best wrestlers in the world to participate. In an interview posted on July 17, James announced that Gail Kim, Madusa, Jazz, and Lufisto would also be serving as producers for the event.

While still at WWE, James had pushed for the company to produce another all-female event, after their Evolution PPV in October 2018, as well as an all-female brand, but was "cut off at every opportunity" as she was told that "women's wrestling doesn't make money." After being released from her WWE contract in April 2021, James signed with the NWA where Corgan approved of an all-female event to allow James to show that women's wrestling is profitable. James said that she would not be wrestling on the event as she was producing it, however, she said she was open to participating in a match during the following night's Anniversary Show. In response to James' hope to feature the best women's wrestlers in the world without contractual issues, WWE executive and NXT head Triple H said that made little business sense. He also claimed that WWE had the best female wrestlers in the world. Despite this, the event received support from UFC Hall of Famer Ronda Rousey, WWE Hall of Famer Trish Stratus, and former WWE star Sasha Banks, among others.

=== Storylines ===
The event featured professional wrestling matches that involved different wrestlers from pre-existing scripted feuds and storylines. Wrestlers portrayed heroes, villains, or less distinguishable characters in scripted events that built tension and culminated in a wrestling match or series of matches. The fifth season of NWA's weekly flagship program, Powerrr, featured storylines leading up to both EmPowerrr and the NWA 73rd Anniversary Show.

On July 13, 2021, at an NWA press conference held at The Chase, Mickie James announced that Kamille would defend the NWA World Women's Championship at EmPowerrr, though she did not reveal Kamille's opponent. On the July 28 episode of AEW Dynamite, it was announced that All Elite Wrestling (AEW) wrestlers Leyla Hirsch and The Bunny would wrestle in a #1 contenders match at AEW Homecoming to determine who would face Kamille for the NWA World Women's Championship at EmPowerrr. At Homecoming, Hirsch defeated Bunny to face Kamille in the NWA World Women's Championship match at EmPowerrr.

On July 13, it was announced that EmPowerrr would host the NWA Women's Invitational Cup; a ten-woman gauntlet match featuring the "best up-and-coming female talent in the world", set for the main event of EmPowerrr, where the winner of the tournament would earn an NWA World Women's Championship match at the NWA 73rd Anniversary Show. The rules were that two competitors would begin the match, and a new competitor would enter every 2 minutes. Eliminations would be by pinfall, submission, or over the top rope.

The participants were:

- Lady Frost
- Tootie Lynn
- Jamie Senegal
- Chelsea Green
- Debbie Malenko
- Bianca Carelli
- Jennacide
- Masha Slamovich
- Thunder Kitty
- Kiera Hogan

On July 16, James announced that the NWA World Women's Tag Team Championship would be revived, and that the new champions would be crowned at EmPowerrr. On August 11, the NWA Twitter responded to a fan claiming there would be four teams taking part in semi-final round matches and then the finals, all of which would take place on the EmPowerrr show.

The teams taking part in the NWA World Women's Tag Team Championship Tournament were:

- The Hex (Allysin Kay and Marti Belle)
- Hell on Heels (Renee Michelle and Sahara Seven)
- Red Velvet and KiLynn King
- The Freebabes (Jazzy Yang, Hollyhood Haley J, and Miranda Gordy)

At Impact Wrestling's Slammiversary, after Impact Knockouts Champion Deonna Purrazzo defended her title against mystery opponent Thunder Rosa, Mickie James – a three-time Knockouts Champion in her own right – returned to Impact to invite Purrazzo to EmPowerrr. After the latter disrespected the former, James superkicked Purrazzo. On the subsequent episode of Impact, James and Purrazzo confronted each other and nearly came to blows, before first-ever Knockouts Champion, Impact Hall of Famer, and producer Gail Kim came out to cool things down. There, Purrazzo accepted James' invitation to defend her title. The following week, it was announced that Melina Perez would be Purrazzo's opponent at EmPowerrr.

On August 21, James on her Instagram ran down the entire card of the event, revealing that Kylie Rae would face Diamante from AEW and Chik Tormenta from Lucha Libre AAA Worldwide (AAA) in a triple threat match.

== Event ==
On-screen personnel
Role:	Name:
English commentators	Austin Idol (pre-show)
English commentators	Brent Tarring (main card)
English commentators	Joe Galli (all matches)
English commentators	Madusa (World Women's Tag Team Championship tournament final)
English commentators	Tim Storm (pre-show)
English commentators	Velvet Sky (main card)
Ring announcer	Angella Sharpe
Backstage interviewer	May Valentine

=== Pre-show ===
During the NWA EmPowerrr pre-show, Paola Blaze (accompanied by Taryn Terrell) defeated Kenzie Paige in a match that didn't aired due to technical issues.

Also on the pre-show, Christi Jaynes faced Skye Blue. In the end, after Jaynes missed a springboard moonsault, Blue rolled her up to win the match.

=== Preliminary matches ===
The actual pay-per-view opened with the executive producer of the show Mickie James addressing the crowd. James talked how she was told this night wouldn't be possible, however, this show proves them wrong.

Next, Chik Tormenta (representing AAA) faced Diamante (representing AEW) and Kylie Rae (representing NWA) in a triple threat match. In the closing moments, as Rae locked Tormenta in a crossface, Diamante broke the hold and followed it with a sunset flip powerbomb on Tormenta into a nearfall to win the match.

After that, in the NWA World Women's Tag Team Championship tournament semi-final match, Hell on Heels (Renee Michelle and Sahara Seven) faced The Hex (Allysin Kay and Marti Belle). In the end, The Hex performed the Hexectution on Michelle to win the match and advancing to the final round.

In the fifth match, which was the second semi-final match, The Freebabes (Jazzy Yang and Miranda Gordy) (accompanied by Hollyhood Haley J) faced Red Velvet and KiLynn King. In the end, King performed the Kingdom on Yang to win the match and advancing to the final round.

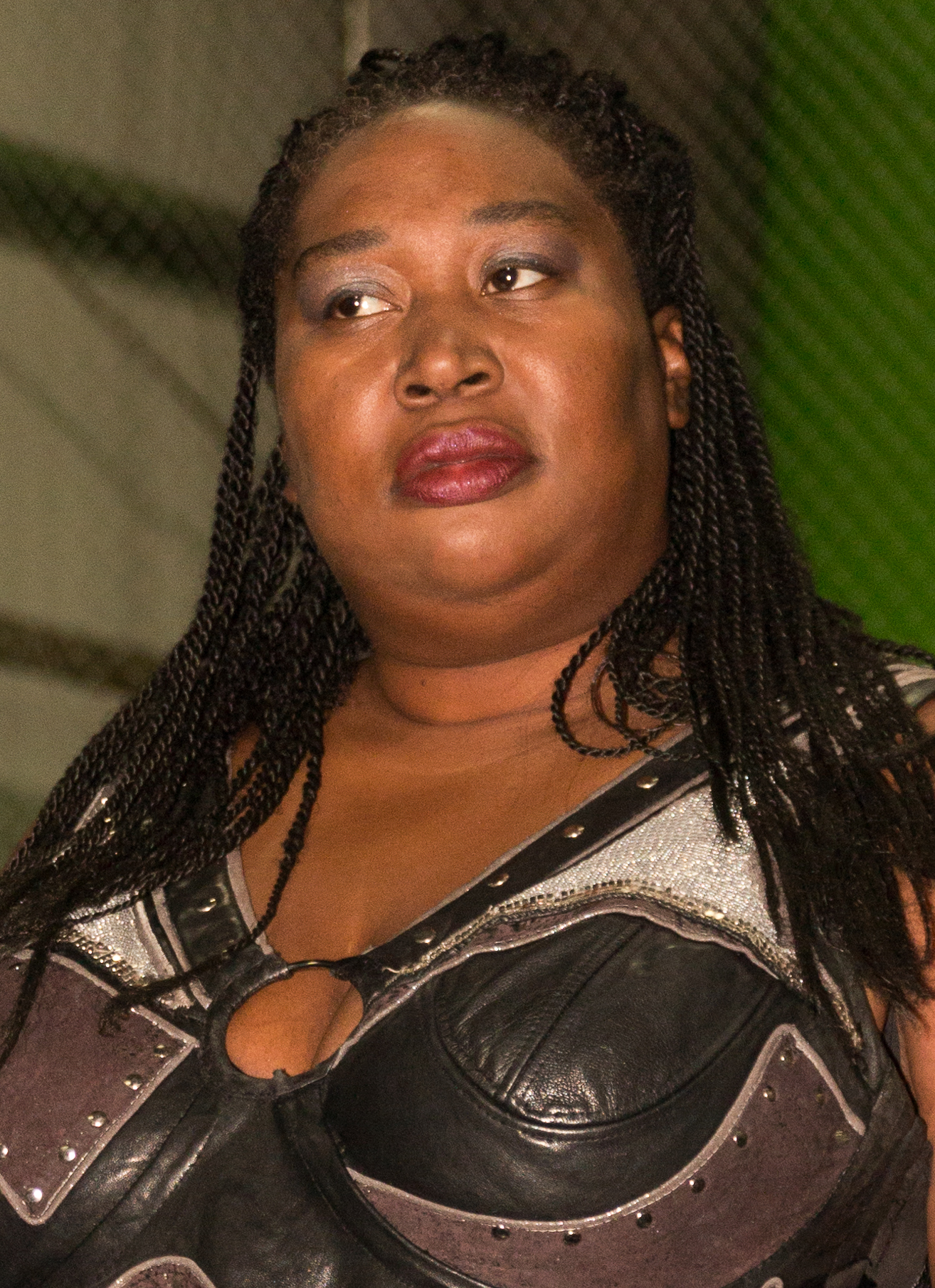
After helping Gail Kim, Awesome Kong announced her retirement.

Next, Impact Wrestling Hall of Famer Gail Kim made a surprise appearance to address the crowd, while thanking NWA letting her be a part of this event as she is one of the producers. She was quickly interrupted by Jennacide, Paola Blaze and Taryn Terrell to confront her. Terrell acted flattered as if Kim only showed out to see her, claimed that there is only room for one person between them, and demanded Kim to leave. After Kim refused to do so, Terrell ordered Blaze and Jennacide to attack Kim, which brought out Awesome Kong to the aid of Kim. Kong attacked Blaze and Jennacide to clear the ring from the villainous trio. Afterwards, Kong announced her retirement from professional wrestling and talked highly about Kim while Kim did the same. They both embraced at the end of the segment.

After that, the Impact Knockouts Champion Deonna Purrazzo defended her title against Melina. Throughout the match, Purrazzo targeted Melina's right knee, as she previously suffered there a real-life injury. In the end, Purrazzo submitted Melina with a single leg Boston crab to retain the title.

The seventh match was a tournament final to crown new World Women's Tag Team Champions between The Hex and King and Velvet, which WWE Hall of Famer Madusa joined the commentary. In the end, The Hex performed an assisted AK-47 to become the new champions. Madusa presented them the revived titles, and afterwards, they embraced with King and Velvet.

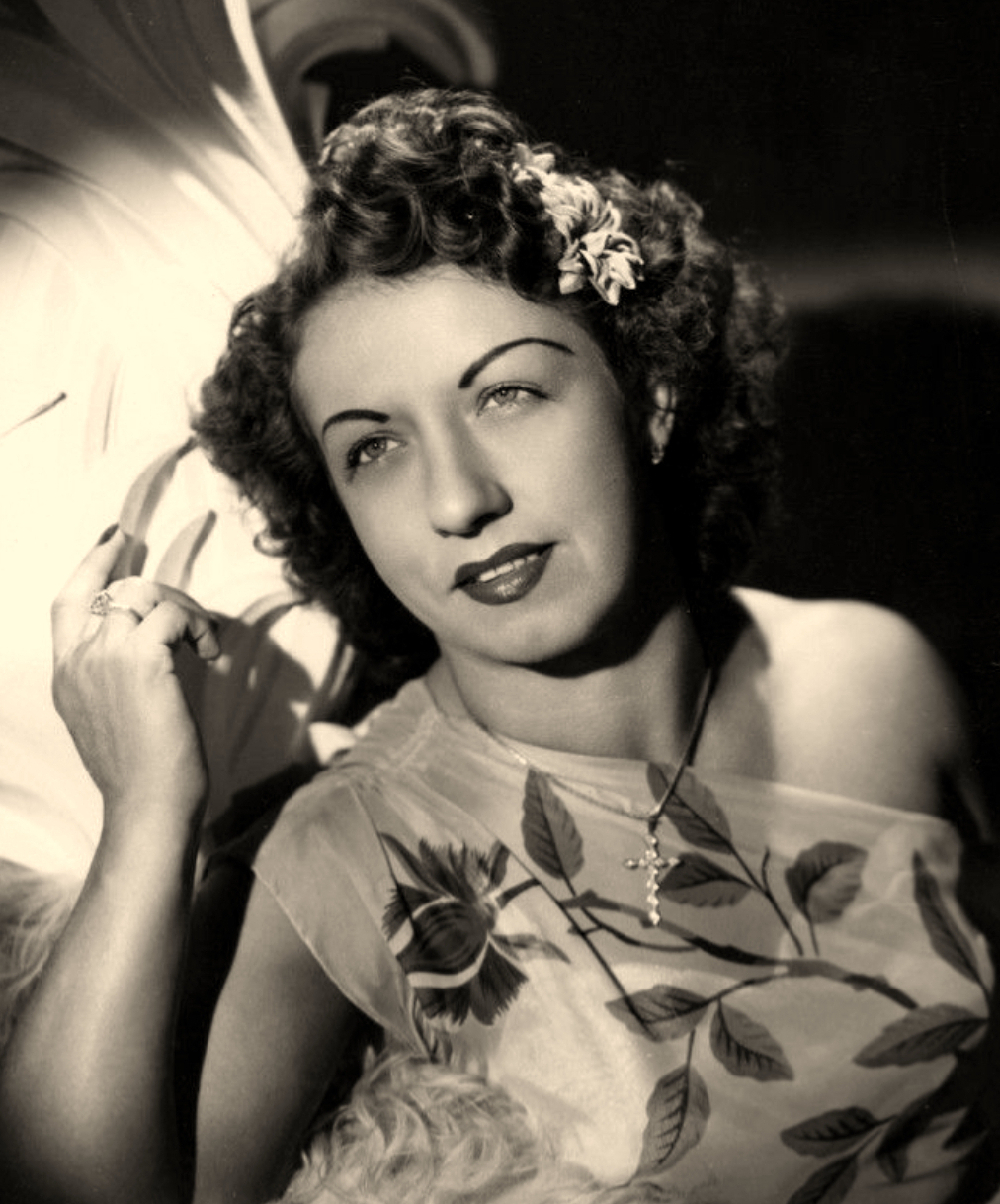
Mildred Burke was considered as the first NWA World Women's Champion.

Before the penultimate match, which was for the NWA World Women's Championship, NWA honoured Mildred Burke as Brent Tarring talked briefly about her history and legacy in wrestling, before presenting her original title which last appeared in an NWA ring on August 20, 1954, which was acquired by the president of NWA, Billy Corgan.

Next, the penultimate match begun, which saw the NWA World Women's Champion Kamille defending her title against Leyla Hirsch. In the closing moments, Hirsch missed a diving moonsault, Kamille went for a spear, but Hirsch dodged it and performed a double knee backbreaker into a cross armbar, which Kamille managed to break from the hold. In the end, Hirsch jumped towards Kamille, but Kamille caught her and tossed her away, followed it with a spear to retain the title.

=== Main event ===
In the main event, ten woman competed in the NWA Women's Invitational Cup Gauntlet match, where the winner would receive a match for the NWA World Women's Championship against Kamille at NWA 73rd Anniversary Show. The first two entrants were Chelsea Green and Kiera Hogan. The third entrant was Bianca Carelli, who was followed by Thunder Kitty. Jennacide was the fifth wrestler to enter the match. Jennacide eliminated Carelli after pinning her in a variation of a swinging DDT. Lady Frost was the sixth entrant, while Jennacide pinned Kitty. Debbie Malenko was the seventh entrant, followed by Jamie Senegal. After Frost performed a corkscrew moonsault on Senegal, Malenko locked Frost into an STF to submit her out of the match. While Malenko put Green into a variation of a Mexican surfboard, Hogan took this opportunity to crawl underneath Green and pinned Malenko.

Masha Slamovich was the ninth entrant. Slamovich, alongside Green and Senegal all pinned Jennacide after various of moves from all three. Tootie Lynn was the final entrant. Slamovich pinned Senegal after a piledriver. Afterwards, Slamovich superplexed Hogan while Green and Lynn powerbombed Slamovich. Regardless, Slamovich pinned Hogan. Slamovich tried to powerbomb Lynn, but Lynn reversed it into an hurricanrana to successfully pin her, leaving her and Green as the final two. Green performed the Unprettier to win the match.

== Results ==
No.	Results	Stipulations	Times
1^{P}	Paola Blaze (with Taryn Terrell) defeated Kenzie Paige	Singles match	3:58
2^{P}	Skye Blue defeated Christi Jaynes by pinfall	Singles match	5:11
3	Diamante defeated Chik Tormenta and Kylie Rae by pinfall	Triple Threat match	8:14
4	The Hex (Allysin Kay and Marti Belle) defeated Hell on Heels (Renee Michelle and Sahara Seven) by pinfall	NWA World Women's Tag Team Championship tournament semi-final	6:54
5	KiLynn King and Red Velvet defeated The Freebabes (Jazzy Yang and Miranda Gordy) (with Haley J) by pinfall	NWA World Women's Tag Team Championship tournament semi-final	6:44
6	Deonna Purrazzo (c) defeated Melina Perez by submission	Singles match for the Impact Knockouts Championship	14:38
7	The Hex (Allysin Kay and Marti Belle) defeated KiLynn King and Red Velvet by pinfall	Tournament final for the NWA World Women's Tag Team Championship	9:41
8	Kamille (c) defeated Leyla Hirsch by pinfall	Singles match for the NWA World Women's Championship	13:03
9	Chelsea Green won by last eliminating Tootie Lynn	NWA Women's Invitational Cup Gauntlet	24:08
(c) / – the champion(s) heading into the match; P / – the match was broadcast on the pre-show

=== NWA World Women's Tag Team Championship tournament bracket ===
Semifinals
The Hex (Allysin Kay and Marti Belle)	Pin
Hell On Heels (Renee Michelle & Sahara Seven)	06:54
KiLynn King and Red Velvet	Pin
The Freebabes (Jazzy Yang and Miranda Gordy)	06:44

Finals
The Hex	Pin
KiLynn King and Red Velvet	09:41

=== NWA Women's Invitational Cup gauntlet match entrances and eliminations ===
Draw	Entrant	Order	Eliminated by	Method of elimination	Elimination(s)
1	Chelsea Green	–	Winner	–	2
2	Kiera Hogan	7	Masha Slamovich	Pinfall	1
3	Bianca Carelli	1	Jennacide	Pinfall	0
4	Thunder Kitty	2	Jennacide	Pinfall	0
5	Jennacide	5	Chelsea Green, Jamie Senegal, and Masha Slamovich	Pinfall	2
6	Lady Frost	3	Debbie Malenko	Submission	0
7	Debbie Malenko	4	Kiera Hogan	Pinfall	1
8	Jamie Senegal	6	Masha Slamovich	Submission	0
9	Masha Slamovich	8	Tootie Lynn	Pinfall	3
10	Tootie Lynn	9	Chelsea Green	Pinfall	1

== See also ==
- WWE Evolution, the first all-women event produced by WWE in 2018.
- Knockouts Knockdown, an annual all-women event first held in 2013 as part of the One Night Only series by Impact Wrestling.
