= Jake Logan =

Jake Logan can refer to:

- Jake Logan, the main character in Tachyon: The Fringe
- Jake Logan (author), the pen name under which several authors have written Slocum Westerns
- Jake Logan (wrestler), an American professional wrestler
