= NWA 73rd Anniversary Show =

2021 National Wrestling Alliance pay-per-view event

NWA 73
- Promotional poster
- Promotion: National Wrestling Alliance
- Date: August 29, 2021
- City: St. Louis, Missouri
- Venue: Chase's Khorassan Ballroom
- Attendance: 856
- Tagline: Wrestling Returns To The Chase

Pay-per-view chronology
| ← Previous; EmPowerrr | Next → Hard Times 2 |

NWA Anniversary Show chronology
| ← Previous; 70th | Next → 74th |

The NWA 73rd Anniversary Show (also simply known as NWA 73) was a professional wrestling pay-per-view event produced by the National Wrestling Alliance (NWA) that was held on August 29, 2021, as the second of two PPV events to take place from the Khorassan Ballroom of the Chase Park Plaza in St. Louis, Missouri. The event was broadcast on FITE TV. It is the eleventh event in the NWA Anniversary Show chronology, and the first since the 70th Anniversary in 2018.

Ten matches were contested at the event, including two on the pre-show. In the main event, Trevor Murdoch defeated Nick Aldis in a Title vs. Career match to win the NWA Worlds Heavyweight Championship. In other prominent matches, La Rebelión (Bestia 666 and Mecha Wolf 450) defeated Aron Stevens and JR Kratos to win the NWA World Tag Team Championship, Kamille defeated Chelsea Green to retain the NWA World Women's Championship, Chris Adonis defeated James Storm to retain the NWA National Championship, and Judais won a battle royal to become the number one contender to the NWA National Championship. The event was also notable for a surprise appearance by Ric Flair, which was his first NWA appearance since 2008, when he was inducted into the NWA Hall of Fame.

== Production ==
=== Background ===
Other on-screen personnel
| Role: | Name: |
|---|---|
| Commentators | Joe Galli |
| Commentators | Tim Storm |
| Commentators | Velvet Sky |
| Commentators | Conrad Thompson |

On the June 8, 2021, episode of NWA Power, National Wrestling Alliance (NWA) president Billy Corgan announced a four-day block of NWA programming from Saturday, August 28 to Tuesday, August 31 that would emanate from the Khorassan Ballroom of the Chase Park Plaza in St. Louis, Missouri, marking the first event that the NWA has held outside of the state of Georgia since the 2019 Crockett Cup. The block consisted of two pay-per-view (PPV) events, which were broadcast exclusively on FITE TV, and two Power tapings. NWA 73 was announced as the Sunday PPV, celebrating the 73rd anniversary of the National Wrestling Alliance. On August 28, the NWA released a video package on their YouTube page that would be used for the cold opening of the PPV event, celebrating the history of wrestling at The Chase, with narration provided by actor John Goodman.

=== Storylines ===
The event featured professional wrestling matches that involved different wrestlers from pre-existing scripted feuds and storylines. Wrestlers portrayed heroes, villains, or less distinguishable characters in scripted events that built tension and culminated in a wrestling match or series of matches. The fifth season of NWA's weekly flagship program, Power, featured storylines leading up to both NWA EmPowerrr and the Anniversary Show.

Women's wrestling veteran Mickie James, who was revealed as executive producer for the previous pay-per-view, EmPowerrr, revealed that she would be issuing an open challenge at the 73rd Anniversary Show. Her opponent would be revealed on August 13 as Kylie Rae.

On July 13 at an NWA press conference held at The Chase, James announced the NWA Women's Invitational; a tournament held on EmPowerr featuring the best up-and-coming female talent in the world, where the winner of the tournament would defend every year on NWA Anniversary weekend. She also announced that the winner of the tournament would earn an NWA World Women's Championship match at NWA 73.

After Trevor Murdoch failed twice to capture the NWA Worlds Heavyweight Championship from Nick Aldis at When Our Shadows Fall and TMART Promotions' The Gathering 2, it was announced on July 25 that Murdoch would get one more chance, redeeming his Champions Series title shot for Aldis' title at NWA 73 but Aldis' politicking made it a Title vs. Career match.

== Results ==
| No. | Results | Stipulations | Times |
|---|---|---|---|
| 1^{P} | Lady Frost and The Hex (Allysin Kay and Marti Belle) defeated Jennacide, Paola Mayfield, and Taryn Terrell | Six-woman tag team match | 5:07 |
| 2^{P} | PJ Hawx defeated Colby Corino | Singles match | 6:57 |
| 3 | Tim Storm defeated Thom Latimer and Crimson | Triple Threat Brawl in the Lou match | 9:10 |
| 4 | Mickie James defeated Kylie Rae | Singles match | 5:35 |
| 5 | Tyrus, Cyon, and Jordan Clearwater (with Austin Idol) defeated Da Pope and The End (Odinson and Parrow) | Six-man tag team match | 12:52 |
| 6 | Chris Adonis (c) defeated James Storm | Singles match for the NWA National Championship | 14:03 |
| 7 | Judais (with Father James Mitchell) won after eliminating JTG (Note: Other competitors by order of elimination: Rush Freeman, "Heartthrob" Jaden Roller, Captain YUMA, Jeremiah Plunkett, Marshe Rockett, Sal Rinauro, Jamie Stanley, El Rudo, Mims, Slice Boogie, and Luke Hawx) | Battle royal to determine the number one contender to the NWA National Championship | 20:08 |
| 8 | Kamille (c) defeated Chelsea Green | Singles match for the NWA World Women's Championship; This was Greens guaranteed title shot for winning the NWA Women's Invitational Cup Gauntlet | 12:33 |
| 9 | La Rebelión (Bestia 666 and Mecha Wolf 450) (with Konnan) defeated Aron Stevens and J. R. Kratos (c) | Tag team match for the NWA World Tag Team Championship | 14:04 |
| 10 | Trevor Murdoch (career) defeated Nick Aldis (c) | Title vs. Career match for the NWA Worlds Heavyweight Championship; This was Murdoch's Champions Series cash-in match | 16:25 |
(c) / – the champion(s) heading into the match; P / – the match was broadcast on the pre-show
