= NWA Hard Times 6 =

2026 National Wrestling Alliance professional wrestling show

Hard Times 6
- Promotional poster
- Promotion: National Wrestling Alliance
- Date: June 6, 2026 (aired August 1, 2026, August 8, 2026, August 15, 2026, August 22, 2026)
- City: Atlanta, Georgia
- Venue: Center Stage

Supercard chronology
← Previous; Crockett Cup	Next → 78th Anniversary Show

NWA Hard Times chronology
← Previous; V	Next → —

NWA Hard Times 6 was professional wrestling event produced by the National Wrestling Alliance (NWA). As the name implies, it was the sixth event in the Hard Times chronology. The event took place on June 6, 2026, at Center Stage in Atlanta, Georgia, and aired on tape delay across several episodes of NWA Powerrr on Comet.

== Production ==
=== Background ===
NWA Hard Times is an annual professional wrestling event produced by the National Wrestling Alliance. The inaugural Hard Times event took place on January 24, 2020, as a pay-per-view event. As of 2024, the event has served as a television taping for NWA Powerrr under the NWA's "Signature Live Events" banner.

On April 10, 2026, the NWA announced that Hard Times 6 would take place at Center Stage in Atlanta, Georgia on June 6.

=== Storylines ===
The event featured professional wrestling matches that involve different wrestlers from pre-existing scripted feuds and storylines. Wrestlers portray heroes, villains, or less distinguishable characters in scripted events that built tension and culminate in a wrestling match or series of matches. Storylines were played out on the twenty-seventh season of the NWA's weekly series, Powerrr.

At the Crockett Cup, Tiffany Nieves lost the NWA World Women's Television Championship to Gisele Shaw. Afterwards, in a backstage promo, a distraught Nieves, flanked by her stable TV-MA (Miss Starr and Gretta), decided things needed to change for the better of their group. Later in the night, both Gretta and Nieves competed in the Burke Invitational Gauntlet, entering fourth and eighth, respectively. The match would ultimately come down to both women, but Nieves compelled Gretta to eliminate herself to give her the victory; she would earn a bouquet of roses that she could redeem for an immediate NWA World Women's Championship match at the time and place of her choosing. That very title would be defended later on, as the champion Natalia Markova would retain against Sirena Veil. However, after the match, Gretta would attack Markova, allowing Nieves to invoke her opportunity and immediately win the championship. On May 19, the NWA announced Nieves' first title defense as Markova invoked her rematch clause for Hard Times 6.

The previous August, Colby Corino announced via X that he would be taking time away from in-ring competition after having had emergency neck and spinal surgery. While he wouldn't wrestle for the next several months, Corino would appear sporadically on NWA Powerrr to provide fans with updates on his condition, soon proving he had full range of motion in his neck, yet was not cleared for competition. Additionally, on January 12, 2026, the NWA announced Corino had signed a new multi-year contract with the company. Four months later, on May 24, it was announced that Corino would make his in-ring return at Hard Times 6, facing NWA territory star Axton Ray.

At the April 25 NWA Powerrr tapings, the NWA held a training seminar before the event. Clips of the seminar were shown during the May 30 episode, one of which was a confrontation between NWA National Champion Mike Mondo and Bryan Idol over how to train the rookies. The following day, it was announced via Instagram that Mondo would defend his title against Idol at Hard Times 6.

In the quarterfinals of the Crockett Cup, The Southern Six (Kerry Morton and Alex Taylor) lost to The Wrestling Machines (Mike Mondo and Spencer Slade). Towards the end of the match, Slade held Taylor in an ankle lock while Morton was held up with Mondo on the outside. Morton would be able to break away, but when he entered the ring, he hesitated to break Taylor out of the submission; Taylor ultimately tapped out, eliminating The Southern Six from the tournament. The Southern Six, along with Kerry's father Ricky Morton and NWA World's Heavyweight Champion Silas Mason, would continue to bicker after the match. Later in the night, Mason, backed up by The Southern Six, defended his title against Bryan Idol in a No Limits Falls Count Anywhere match. At one point in the match, when both Mason and Idol were down, Kerry was directed by his father to drape Idol over Mason, effectively turning on the rest of The Southern Six. Mason would still kick out and eventually defeat Idol to retain his title. On the subsequent episode of NWA Powerrr, both Mason and Taylor addressed the situation with the Mortons, with Mason calling Kerry out for his betrayal while Taylor reasoned that Kerry was trying step out of Mason's shadow. On June 3, the NWA would announce that Kerry Morton would challenge Silas Mason for the NWA World's Heavyweight Championship at Hard Times 6.

== Results ==
First episode (aired August 1, 2026)
No.	Results	Stipulations	Times
1	Damian Fenrir defeated Slade (c) (with Aron Stevens) by disqualification	Singles match for the NWA World Junior Heavyweight Championship	6:25
2	The Hardway (Jack Vaughn and Dalton McKenzie) defeated The Slimeballz (Sage Chantz and Tommy Rant) (c) (with Aron Stevens) by pinfall	Tag team match for the NWA United States Tag Team Championship	5:40
3	Hammerstone defeated Richard Adonis by pinfall	Singles match	4:44
4	Pretty Empowered (Kenzie Paige and Kylie Paige) (c) (with Tommy Henry) defeated Sirena Veil and Alice Crowley (with Paige Collett) by pinfall	Tag team match for the NWA World Women's Tag Team Championship	5:11
(c) / – the champion(s) heading into the match

Second episode (aired August 8, 2026)
No.	Results	Stipulations	Times
1	Mzry (c) (with Brandon McCord) defeated Daisy Kill (with Big Cuzzo) by pinfall	Singles match for the NWA World Television Championship	5:23
2	The Federation of Champions (Buster and Lockjaw Drake) (with Aron Stevens) defeated Jack Valor and Eddie Grayson by pinfall	Tag team match	4:44
3	Da Pope defeated Carnage by disqualification	Singles match	6:33
4	Gretta (with Tiffany Nieves and Miss Starr) defeated Natalia Markova by pinfall	No Limits match Since Gretta won, Nieves could choose the stipulation for her and Markova's upcoming title match at NWA 78. Had Markova won, Nieves would have had to relinquish the NWA World Women's Championship.	4:01
(c) / – the champion(s) heading into the match

Third episode (aired August 15, 2026)
No.	Results	Stipulations	Times
1	Thom Latimer defeated El Dragón Nihan (with Brandon McCord) by pinfall	No Disqualification, No Countout match	5:46
2	Colby Corino defeated Axton Ray by pinfall	Singles match	6:09
3	The Royal Court (King Trevor Murdoch I, Sir Michael, Duke of Knox and Squire Franks) (with Jacob the Necromancer) defeated Mims and The Light by pinfall	Six-man tag team match	6:04
4	Bryan Idol defeated Mike Mondo (c) (with Aron Stevens) by pinfall	Singles match for the NWA National Heavyweight Championship	5:14
(c) / – the champion(s) heading into the match

Fourth episode (aired August 22, 2026)
No.	Results	Stipulations	Times
1	Gisele Shaw (c) defeated Liviyah by pinfall	Singles match for the NWA World Women's Television Championship	5:57
2	Kratos defeated Effy by pinfall	Singles match	7:14
3	Carson Batholomew Drake (with Aron Stevens) defeated Pretty Boy Smooth (with Pastor C-Lo) by pinfall	Singles match to determine the #1 contender for the NWA World's Heavyweight Championship	4:15
4	Silas Mason (c) defeated Kerry Morton (with Ricky Morton) by pinfall	Singles match for the NWA World's Heavyweight Championship; Alex Taylor was the special guest referee.	8:29
(c) / – the champion(s) heading into the match

== See also ==
- 2026 in professional wrestling
