= Greg Anthony (wrestler) =

American professional wrestler

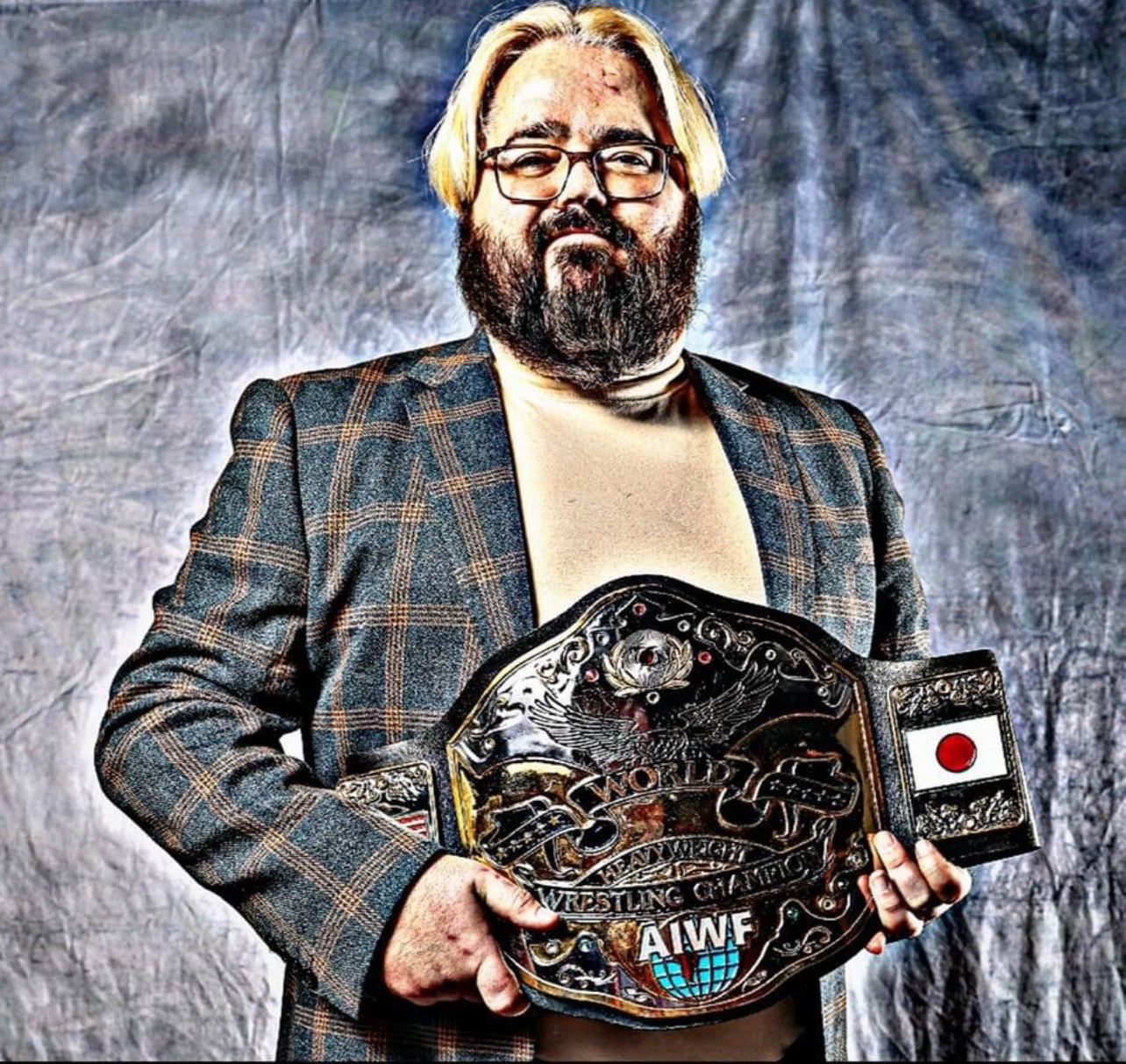

Personal information
- Born: June 5, 1981 (age 45) Centralia, Illinois, United States

Professional wrestling career
- Billed height: 5 ft 8 in (1.73 m)
- Billed weight: 225 lb (102 kg)
- Trained by: Rude; Sir Mo; Motley Cruz; Bill Dundee; Tom Prichard; Bobby Eaton
- Debut: April 2000

Greg Anthony (born June 5, 1981), is an American professional wrestler, booker, columnist, and wrestling historian. He has wrestled for the National Wrestling Alliance as well as his former WWE developmental territory, Memphis Championship Wrestling.

== Early life ==
Greg was born in Centralia, IL and his family lived in Salem, IL until April 1988 when his family relocated to Dyersburg, TN.

== Professional wrestling career ==
Greg Anthony started his career with WWE developmental territory, Memphis Championship Wrestling. Once MCW closed, he earned a spot with NWA Mid South, where he won the NWA Southern Junior Heavyweight Championship.

Over the next several years, Greg racked up titles all over Tennessee, Arkansas and Missouri living up to his moniker of The Golden Boy. In 2023, Greg won the AIWF World Heavyweight Championship, defeating Ty Tyson. After a 441 day reign he lost the gold to Bruiser Kohloff, but on October 19, 2024 he became a 2-time AIWF World Champion when he won the gold at the 10th Anniversary Show of Pro Wrestling Mid South (Glory Last's Forever X).

=== Midnight Gold ===
In 2009, "Beautiful" Bobby Eaton moved to Arkansas and was looking for a young talent to team with. Greg Anthony was handpicked by Bobby and his manager Brian Thompson to form the team Midnight Gold. Over the next 2 years they main evented across the south and won many tag titles along the way.

=== Traditional Championship Wrestling ===
Midnight Gold (Greg Anthony & Bobby Eaton) along with their manager, entered TCW with a lot of fanfare. Once Bobby Eaton retired from in ring competition, Greg continued his singles career becoming a 3 Time and the inaugural TCW World Junior Heavyweight Champion. He also become a 3 Time TCW International Heavyweight Champion and a 2 Time TCW World Tag Team Champion (with tag partner Matt Riviera), making him a Triple Crown Champion.

=== National Wrestling Alliance ===
Greg Anthony has worked off and on with the National Wrestling Alliance for years. He is a former 3 Time NWA National Heavyweight Champion, a former NWA Southern Heavyweight Champion, a former 4 time NWA Southern Junior Heavyweight Champion, former 2 time NWA Lonestar Tag Team Champion with Matt Riviera, and former 7 time NWA Mid South Heavyweight Champion.

== Championships and accomplishments ==
- Allied Independent Wrestling Federations
  - AIWF World Heavyweight Championship (2 time)
- NWA Elite Championship Wrestling
  - NWA ECW Tag Team Championship (1 Time) - with Matt Riviera
- NWA Lonestar
  - NWA Lonestar Tag Team Championships (2 times) – with Matt Riviera
- NWA Mid South
  - NWA Mid South Heavyweight Championship (7 times)
  - NWA National Heavyweight Championship (3 times)
  - NWA Southern Heavyweight Championship (1 time)
  - NWA Southern Junior Heavyweight Championship (4 times)
- Traditional Championship Wrestling
  - TCW International Heavyweight Championship (3 times)
  - TCW World Junior Heavyweight Championship (3 times)
  - TCW World Tag Team Championship (2 times) – with Matt Riviera
- Pro Wrestling Mid South
  - Mid South Unified Heavyweight Championship (9 times)
  - Mid South Tag Team Championship (6 times) – with Jason Rage (3 times), Matt Riviera (1 time), Matt McNamara (1 time), and Jon Michael (1 time)

== Personal life ==
Greg married his wife Jeanna in 2006. They have 2 sons, Xavier and Xander. Greg Anthony is a devout Christian and has his own ministry, Genesis 32:24 Ministries, designed to help people in need. In 2023, Greg Anthony appeared on the hit NBC Series, Young Rock, playing the role of Dick Murdoch
