= Jake Logan (wrestler) =

American wrestler (born 1993)

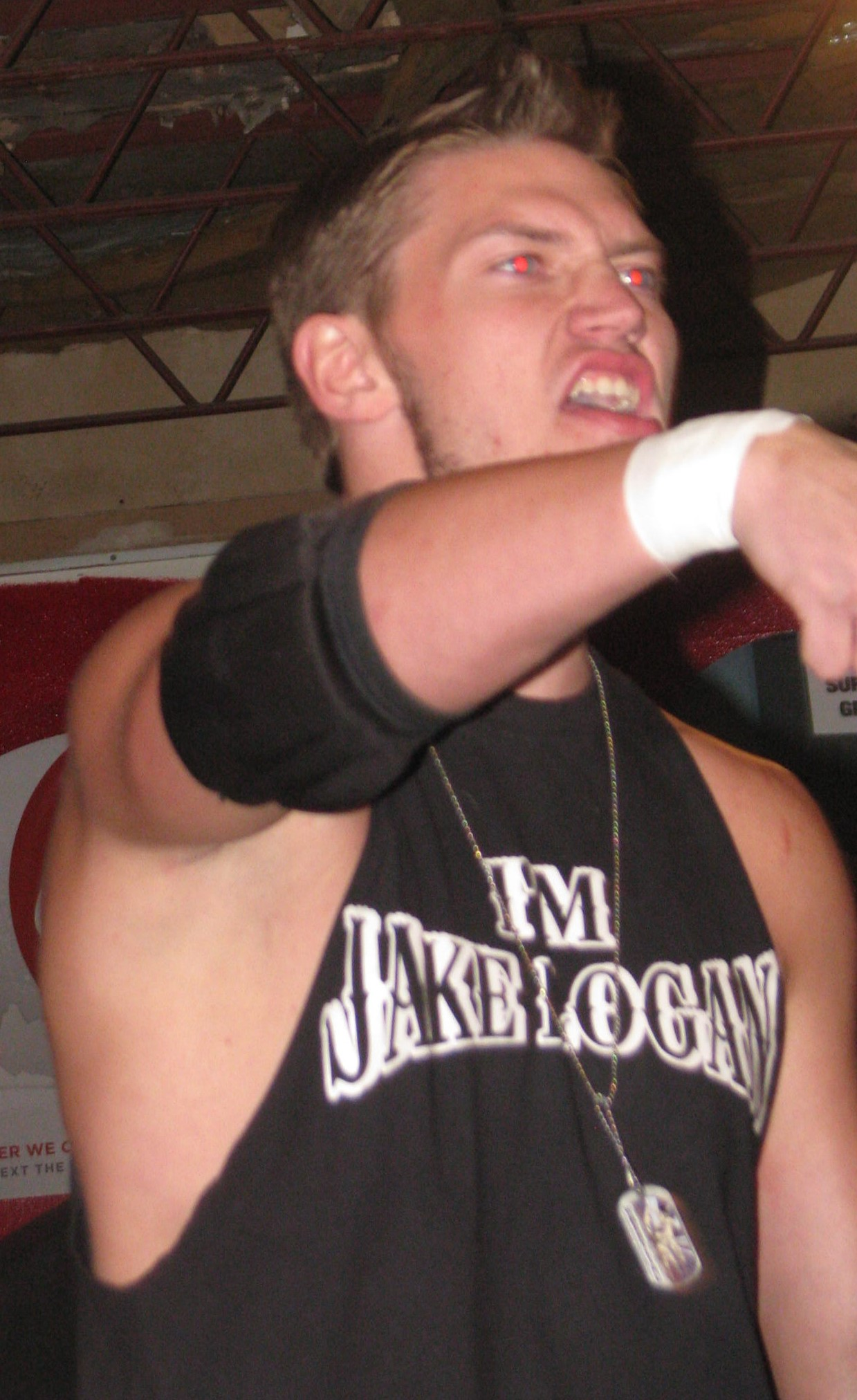
- Logan in 2013

Personal information
- Born: May 22, 1993 (age 33) Landstuhl, Germany
- Website: Instagram.com/official_imjakelogan

Professional wrestling career
- Ring name: Jake Logan
- Billed height: 6 ft 1 in (185 cm)
- Billed weight: 215 lb (98 kg)
- Billed from: Amarillo, Texas
- Trained by: Dory Funk Jr.
- Debut: May 22, 2010 vs Cody Jones

Jake Logan (born May 22, 1993) is an American professional wrestler. currently performing on the independent circuit. He is a former and youngest ever to hold the NWA National Heavyweight Champion.

== Professional wrestling career ==
Logan was trained by Dory Funk Jr. and then began his career on the independent circuit. Logan wrestles often for the Amarillo based NWA Territory NWA Top of Texas. On September 17, 2016 Logan defeated Greg Anthony to win his first NWA National Heavyweight Championship.

== Championships and accomplishments ==
- Destiny Combat Championship Wrestling
  - DCCW National Championship (1 time)
- United Pro Wrestling Association
  - UPWA Heavyweight Championship (1 time)
- Independent Wrestling Expo
  - IWE Men's Tournament (2020)
- National Wrestling Alliance
  - NWA National Heavyweight Championship (1 time)
- NWA Texoma
  - NWA Texoma Texas Heavyweight Championship (1 time)
- NWA Top of Texas
  - NWA Top of Texas Heavyweight Championship (1 time)
  - NWA Top of Texas Panhandle Heavyweight Championship (14 times)
  - NWA Top of Texas Tag Team Championship (3 times)– with Ryan Justice (1) and Cody Jones (3)
