= NWA National Heavyweight Championship =

Professional wrestling championship

- The current belt

Details
- Promotion: National Wrestling Alliance
- Date established: January 12, 1980
- Current champion: Bryan Idol
- Date won: June 6, 2026 (aired August 15, 2026)

Other names
- NWA National Heavyweight Championship (1980–2018, 2022–present); NWA National Championship (2018–2022)
Statistics
- First champion: Austin Idol
- Most reigns: 3 reigns: Damien Wayne; Phil "Nitro" Monahan; Greg Anthony; Lou Marconi; Paul Orndorff; Tommy Rich; Larry Zbyszko; The Masked Superstar
- Longest reign: Phil Shatter (763 days)
- Shortest reign: Nikita Koloff (<1 day)

The NWA National Heavyweight Championship is a professional wrestling championship owned and promoted by the U.S.-based, National Wrestling Alliance (NWA).

The championship was established in January 1980 as the top singles title of Georgia Championship Wrestling (GCW), a prominent NWA-affiliated promotion. Until its September 1986 deactivation, the title remained Georgia-based—across 3 different owners (GCW; Championship Wrestling from Georgia, and Jim Crockett Promotions).

The title was reactivated in May 1997 and promoted by a handful of NWA-affiliated independent promotions, until it was vacated in October 2017.

In October 2018, the title was renamed the "NWA National Championship", reactivated, and the NWA (now a promotion, instead of a sanctioning body) held an 8-person tournament to crown a new titleholder.

== History ==
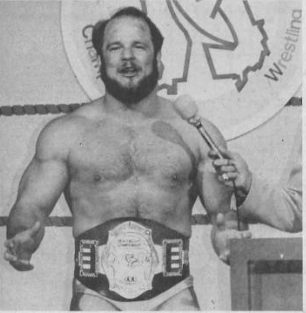
Buzz Sawyer with the belt while in Georgia Championship Wrestling, 1982

The NWA National Heavyweight Championship was the top singles title in the NWA-affiliated promotion, Georgia Championship Wrestling (GCW), from 1980 until 1986. Contrary to its name, the title was defended almost exclusively in just one state, Georgia. When the World Wrestling Federation (now WWE) purchased GCW in July 1984 (an event referred to as Black Saturday), then-champion The Spoiler signed with the WWF (which briefly recognized the title). Soon thereafter, Championship Wrestling from Georgia—started by former GCW booker Ole Anderson—launched and gained NWA affiliation. The title was awarded to Ted DiBiase.

In 1985, Jim Crockett Promotions purchased the weekend TBS timeslots for wrestling from the WWF, producing its own version of the "World Championship Wrestling" TV show. JCP had also purchased Championship Wrestling from Georgia (taking over its Saturday morning time slot, as well), and began recognizing CWG's championships. Eventually, Crockett held a unification match between his company's NWA United States Champion Nikita Koloff, and NWA National Champion Wahoo McDaniel, which Koloff won. The National title was deactivated afterwards.

In May 1997, the title was reactivated and promoted by various NWA-affiliated, independent promotions across the United States. During this period it was considered the third most important heavyweight title in the NWA, after the World and North American titles.

In October 2017, Billy Corgan's company Lightning One, Inc., purchased the National Wrestling Alliance's intellectual and physical properties. At that point, all pre-existing NWA affiliation agreements with other promotions were ended; most NWA-branded championships (including the National) would be vacated in the months that immediately followed. The only two championships not vacated were the NWA Worlds Heavyweight Championship, and NWA World Women's Championship. Corgan transformed the NWA from a governing body, to a wrestling promotion—one seeking to proudly revive and preserve the mood, look, and feel of the 1970s/1980s, Georgia/Mid-Atlantic era of wrestling.

In October 2018, the NWA announced the National title would be rebooted on the NWA 70th Anniversary Show, with an eight-man, championship tournament featuring: Jay Bradley; Colt Cabana; Sammy Guevara; Mike Parrow; Scorpio Sky; Sam Shaw; Ricky Starks; and Willie Mack. The championship was officially renamed the "NWA National Championship". A new title belt was commissioned: its design was a faithful restoration of the 1970s, Crockett/Mid-Atlantic Wrestling version of the NWA United States Heavyweight Championship belt, with a few modern tweaks. In effect, the National title has become the second most important heavyweight title in the NWA.

== Reigns ==
The inaugural champion was Austin Idol. The longest reigning champion is Phil Shatter, who held the title from January 17, 2009 to February 19, 2011, for a total of 763 days. Ricky Murdock holds the record for longest combined reigns (2) at 817 days. Killer Tim Brooks has the shortest reign. Damien Wayne, Phil "Nitro" Monahan, Greg Anthony, Lou Marconi, Paul Orndorff, Tommy Rich, Larry Zbyszko, and Masked Superstar have the most reigns with 3 apiece.

The current champion is Bryan Idol, who is in his first reign. He won title by defeating Mike Mondo at NWA Hard Times 6 on June 6, 2026 in Atlanta, Georgia.

=== Names ===
Name	Years
NWA National Heavyweight Championship	January 12, 1980 – October 21, 2018
NWA National Championship	October 21, 2018 – 2022
NWA National Heavyweight Championship	2022 – present

Key
No.	Overall reign number
Reign	Reign number for the specific champion
Days	Number of days held
+	Current reign is changing daily

No.	Champion	Championship change			Reign statistics		Notes	Ref.
No.	Champion	Date	Event	Location	Reign	Days	Notes	Ref.
National Wrestling Alliance (NWA)
1	Austin Idol	January 12, 1980	N/A	Atlanta, GA	1	221	Also defeated Mr. Wrestling II to win the NWA Georgia Heavyweight Championship on March 29, 1980 in Atlanta, Georgia.	
—	Vacated	August 20, 1980	—	—	—	—	Vacated for unknown reasons.	
2	Jack Brisco	October 9, 1980	N/A	Atlanta, GA	1	58	Defeated Terry Funk in a tournament final to win the vacant championship.	
3	The Mongolian Stomper	December 12, 1980	Live event	Atlanta, GA	1	107		
4	Steve Olsonoski	March 29, 1981	Live event	Atlanta, GA	1	139		
5	The Masked Superstar	August 15, 1981	Live event	Columbus, GA	1	44	On September 19, 1981, the NWA Georgia Heavyweight Championship was unified with the National Heavyweight Championship.	
6	Tommy Rich	September 28, 1981	Live event	Augusta, GA	1	58	This was a mask vs. hair steel cage match.	
7	The Masked Superstar	November 25, 1981	Live event	Atlanta, GA	2	53	This was a Texas death match.	
8	Tommy Rich	January 17, 1982	Live event	Atlanta, GA	2	57	This was a steel cage match.	
9	Ron Bass	March 15, 1982	Live event	Augusta, GA	1	35		
10	Tommy Rich	April 19, 1982	Live event	Augusta, GA	3	13		
11	Buzz Sawyer	May 2, 1982	Live event	Atlanta, GA	1	49		
12	Paul Orndorff	June 20, 1982	Live event	Atlanta, GA	1	40		
—	Vacated	July 30, 1982	—	—	—	—	Paul Orndorff vacated the championship in order to focus on a challenge to NWA World Heavyweight Champion Ric Flair.	
13	The Super Destroyer	August 29, 1982	Live event	Atlanta, GA	1	35	The Super Destroyer defeated Paul Orndorff in the finals of an 11-man tournament to win the vacant championship.	
14	Paul Orndorff	October 3, 1982	Live event	Atlanta, GA	2	14		
15	The Masked Superstar	October 17, 1982	Live event	Atlanta, GA	3	21		
16	Paul Orndorff	November 7, 1982	Live event	Atlanta, GA	3	133	This was a no disqualification match. While most records show that Orndorff held and defended the title uninterrupted during this reign, some records show that Killer Karl Kox won the title sometime in December 1982, losing it to Tommy Rich in February 1983 before being regained by Orndorff in March.	
17	Killer Tim Brooks	March 20, 1983	Live event	Atlanta, GA	1	0		
18	Larry Zbyszko	March 20, 1983	Live event	Atlanta, GA	1	41	Bought the championship from Killer Tim Brooks for $25,000.	
—	Vacated	April 30, 1983	—	—	—	—	Larry Zbyszko was stripped of the championship by NWA President Bob Geigel for buying it.	
19	Larry Zbyszko	June 5, 1983	Live event	Atlanta, GA	2	14	Zbyszko Defeated Mr. Wrestling II in the finals of a 12-man tournament to win the vacant championship and a $25,000 cash prize.	
20	Mr. Wrestling II	June 19, 1983	Live event	Atlanta, GA	1	28	Killer Brooks and Mr. Wrestling I served as the special guest referees.	
21	Larry Zbyszko	July 17, 1983	Live event	Huntington, WV	3	70	This was a no time limit no disqualification match.	
22	Brett Sawyer	September 25, 1983	N/A	Atlanta, GA	1	54		
23	Ted DiBiase	November 18, 1983	N/A	Cleveland, OH	1	92		
24	Brad Armstrong	February 18, 1984	World Championship Wrestling	Atlanta, GA	1	54	Armstrong wrestled under a mask as "Mr. R" (thought to be Tommy Rich under the mask) and pinned Ted DiBiase to win the championship when DiBiase was distracted by Rich standing at the announcers' podium at ringside.	
25	The Spoiler	April 12, 1984	Live event	Wheeling, WV	1	22		
26	Brad Armstrong	May 4, 1984	Live event	Marietta, GA	2	58		
27	The Spoiler	July 1, 1984	Live event	Atlanta, GA	2	13	The Spoiler joined the World Wrestling Federation (WWF) during this reign and was continued to defend the championship as the "National Heavyweight Championship" on WWF events in Georgia.	
28	Ted DiBiase	July 14, 1984	N/A	Macon, GA	2	89	This was a phantom match after The Spoiler went to the World Wrestling Federation.	
29	Ron Garvin	October 11, 1984	GCW Night of Champions	Baltimore, MD	1	233		
30	Black Bart	June 1, 1985	NWA World Championship Wrestling	Atlanta, GA	1	113	The match also had a Loser Leaves Town match.	
31	Terry Taylor	September 22, 1985	N/A	Atlanta, GA	1	67		
32	Buddy Landel	November 28, 1985	Starrcade	Greensboro, NC	1	21		
33	Dusty Rhodes	December 19, 1985	N/A	Albuquerque, NM	1	75	Rhodes was awarded the title in a phantom match after Buddy Landel was fired due to his drug problem.	
34	Tully Blanchard	March 4, 1986	MACW TV Taping	Spartanburg, SC	1	177		
35	Wahoo McDaniel	August 28, 1986	Live event	Los Angeles, CA	1	31		
36	Nikita Koloff	September 28, 1986	Live event	Atlanta, GA	1	<1	This was a championship unification match, where Koloff also defended the NWA United States Heavyweight Championship.	
—	Deactivated	September 28, 1986	—	—	—	—	The championship was unified with the NWA United States Heavyweight Championship.	
37	Big Slam	May 17, 1997	N/A	N/A	1	62	The championship was awarded after the NWA reactivated it.	
38	Salvatore Sincere	July 18, 1997	Live event	Raeford, NC	1	85		
—	Vacated	October 8, 1997	—	—	—	—	The championship was vacated for undocumented reasons.	
39	Doug Gilbert	March 27, 1998	Live event	Mount Holly, NJ	1	148	Defeated Barry Windham and Rocco Rock in a three-way match to win the vacant championship.	
40	Stevie Richards	August 22, 1998	Live event	Mount Holly, NJ	1	63		
41	Doug Gilbert	October 24, 1998	NWA 50th Anniversary Show	Cherry Hill, NJ	2	448	This was an eight-man tag team steel cage match. Gilbert won the title teaming with Steve Corino, Lance Diamond and Rik Ratchett versus Richards, The Pitbulls (#1 and #2) and Dead Man Walking.	
42	Don Brodie	January 15, 2000	N/A	Memphis, TN	1	90		
43	Kevin Northcutt	April 2, 2000	NWA Southwest Parade of Champions	North Richland Hills, TX	1	152		
44	Stone Mountain	September 13, 2000	N/A	Athens, GA	1	52		
45	Terry Knight	November 4, 2000	N/A	Cornelia, GA	1	69	Knight defeated Jesse Taylor on November 18, 2000 in Cornelia, Georgia to unify the NWA Wildside United States Heavyweight Championship	
46	Don Brodie	January 12, 2001	N/A	Greenville, MS	2	210		
—	Vacated	August 10, 2001	—	—	—	—	The championship was vacated after Don Brodie was injured in an automobile accident.	
47	Kevin Northcutt	August 22, 2001	N/A	N/A	2	52	Northcutt was awarded the championship.	
48	Hotstuff Hernandez	October 13, 2001	NWA 53rd Anniversary Show	St. Petersburg, FL	1	455	On May 5, 2002, Shinya Hashimoto defeated Hernandez in a championship match in Tokyo. The championship was returned to Hernandez after Hashimoto refused it. The NWA later claimed that Hashimoto and Hernandez's match in Japan was not for the championship.	
49	Ricky Murdock	January 11, 2003	N/A	Greenville, MS	1	643		
50	Spyder	October 15, 2004	NWA 56th Anniversary Show – night 1	Winnipeg, Manitoba, Canada	1	358		
—	Vacated	October 8, 2005	—	—	—	—	Spyder stripped of the championship when he no-shows a title defense.	
51	Ricky Murdock	October 8, 2005	NWA 57th Anniversary Show	Nashville, TN	2	174	Murdock defeated Conscience and The Juggulator in a three-way match to win the vacant championship.	
—	Vacated	March 31, 2006	—	—	—	—	The championship was held up after a match against Big Bully Douglas, due to interference from Kory Williams.	
52	Big Bully Douglas	April 1, 2006	N/A	Columbia, TN	1	182	Douglas defeated Ricky Murdock in a rematch to win the held up championship.	
53	Kory Williams	September 30, 2006	N/A	Lebanon, TN	1	217		
54	Joey Nelson	May 5, 2007	N/A	Salyersville, KY	1	160		
—	Vacated	October 12, 2007	—	—	—	—	Chance Prophet was stripped of the championship by the NWA Board of Directors due to injury.	
55	Pepper Parks	October 20, 2007	Live event	Lebanon, TN	1	181	Parks defeats Kory Williams to win the vacant championship.	
56	Crusher Hansen	April 18, 2008	PWX Crossfire	McKeesport, PA	1	239		
57	Brandon K	December 13, 2008	N/A	McKeesport, PA	1	4		
58	Crusher Hansen	December 17, 2008	N/A	McKeesport, PA	2	31		
59	Phil Shatter	January 17, 2009	PWX Genesis 2	McKeesport, PA	1	763	This was a three-way elimination match also involving Chris LeRusso.	
60	Chance Prophet	February 19, 2011	N/A	Franklinville, NJ	2	404		
61	Kahagas	March 29, 2012	NWA Ring Warriors Battle of the Belts	Miami, FL	1	230	This was a four corners weapons Russian chain match with The New Heavenly Bodies serving as the special guest referees.	
—	Vacated	November 14, 2012	—	—	—	—	The championship was vacated after Kahagas won the NWA World Heavyweight Championship.	
62	Damien Wayne	January 5, 2013	NWA Edge	Nashville, NC	1	160	Wayne defeated Chance Prophet and Lance Erikson in a three-way dance to win the vacant championship.	
63	Vordell Walker	June 14, 2013	NWA SAW Gathering of the Champions	Millersville, TN	1	49	This was a steel cage match.	
64	Damien Wayne	August 2, 2013	Live event	Millersville, TN	2	43		
65	Phil Monahan	September 14, 2013	Live event	Toledo, OH	1	168		
66	Lou Marconi	March 1, 2014	N/A	Williamston, NC	1	21		
67	Phil Monahan	March 22, 2014	WrestleRama 13	Hillsdale, MI	2	1		
68	Lou Marconi	March 23, 2014	Live event	Oregon, OH	2	13		
69	Phil Monahan	April 5, 2014	N/A	Carolina Beach, NC	3	98		
70	Lou Marconi	July 12, 2014	NWA Smoky Mountain Steel Cage Showdown	Carolina Beach, NC	3	209		
71	Jax Dane	February 6, 2015	Live event	Millersville, TN	1	111	From April 12, Dane holds the National and North American championships. NWA allows him to defend both titles together.	
—	Vacated	May 28, 2015	—	—	—	—	Jax Dane forfeits both of his championships due to injury.	
72	Arrick Andrews	July 11, 2015	Live event	Cookeville, TN	1	175	Andrews defeated Chase Owens in an eight-man tournament final.	
—	Vacated	January 2, 2016	—	—	—	—	Arrick Andrews announced that he had suffered a knee injury in a hunting accident that would keep him out of wrestling for 8 months, and forfeited the championship.	
73	John Saxon	January 9, 2016	N/A	Dyersburg, TN	1	21	Saxon Won a battle royal to win the vacant championship.	
74	Greg Anthony	January 30, 2016	N/A	Dyersburg, TN	1	154		
75	Mustang Mike	July 2, 2016	N/A	Morgan City, LA	1	7	This was a steel cage match.	
76	Greg Anthony	July 9, 2016	N/A	Dyersburg, TN	2	70		
77	Jake Logan	September 17, 2016	N/A	Amarillo, TX	1	42		
78	Greg Anthony	October 29, 2016	Live event	Dyersburg, TN	3	21		
79	Damien Wayne	November 19, 2016	N/A	Gallatin, TN	3	76		
80	Kahagas	February 3, 2017	N/A	Franklin, KY	2	239		
National Wrestling Alliance/Lightning One Inc.
—	Vacated	September 30, 2017	—	—	—	—	The championship was vacated when NWA terminated all contracts with its licensees.	
81	Willie Mack	October 21, 2018	NWA 70th Anniversary Show	Nashville, TN	1	188	Mack defeated Sam Shaw to win the vacant championship.	
82	Colt Cabana	April 27, 2019	Crockett Cup 2019	Concord, NC	1	63		
83	James Storm	June 29, 2019	Ring of Honor Wrestling	Philadelphia, Pennsylvania, U.S.	1	94	This was a dark match which aired on NWA's YouTube channel on July 12, 2019.	
84	Colt Cabana	October 1, 2019	NWA Power	Atlanta, GA	2	74	Aired on YouTube on November 5, 2019.	
85	Aron Stevens	December 14, 2019	NWA Into the Fire	Atlanta, GA	1	290	This was a Triple Threat match also involving Ricky Starks.	
86	Trevor Murdoch	September 29, 2020	UWN Primetime Live	Long Beach, CA	1	182		
87	Chris Adonis	March 30, 2021	NWA Power	Atlanta, GA	1	56		
—	Vacated	May 25, 2021	—	—	—	—	Aired on tape delay. Chris Adonis vacated the title to enter a battle royal to decide the number one contender for the NWA Worlds Heavyweight Championship.	
88	Chris Adonis	June 7, 2021	NWA SuperPowerrr	Atlanta, GA	2	249	Aired on tape delay on July 6, 2021. Defeated JTG in the tournament finals to win the vacant championship.	
89	Anthony Mayweather	February 12, 2022	NWA PowerrrTrip	Oak Grove, KY	1	36	Aired on tape delay on March 1, 2022.	
90	Jax Dane	March 20, 2022	Crockett Cup 2022	Nashville, TN	2	160	This was Dane's Champion Series cash-in match.	
91	Cyon	August 27, 2022	NWA 74th Anniversary Show Night 1	St. Louis, MO	1	223		
92	EC3	April 7, 2023	NWA 312	Highland Park, IL	1	96		
—	Vacated	July 12, 2023	NWA Powerrr	Highland Park, IL	—	—	After successfully defending the title against Silas Mason, EC3 vacated the title to challenge for the NWA Worlds Heavyweight Championship at NWA 75.	
93	"Thrillbilly" Silas Mason	August 26, 2023	NWA 75th Anniversary Show Night 1	St. Louis, MO	1	189	Won the vacant title after defeating JR Kratos and Odinson in a triple threat match.	
—	Vacated	March 2, 2024	Hard Times 4	Dothan, Alabama	—	—	Silas Mason vacated the title to challenge for the NWA Worlds Heavyweight Championship at Hard Times 4.	
94	Thom Latimer	March 2, 2024	Hard Times 4	Dothan, Alabama	1	182	Won the vacant title after defeating Blake Troop, Burchill and Zyon in a four-way match. Aired on tape delay as a special episode of Powerrr on April 9.	
—	Vacated	N/A	—	—	—	—	Latimer vacated the title to challenge for the NWA Worlds Heavyweight Championship at NWA 76th Anniversary Show. Aired on tape delay as an episode of NWA Powerrr on September 10, 2024.	
95	Mims	August 31, 2024	NWA 76th Anniversary Show	Philadelphia, Pennsylvania	1	350	Won the vacant title after defeating Bryan Idol, Burchill and Carson Drake in a four-way elimination match. Aired on tape delay as a special episode of Powerrr on October 8.	
96	Mike Mondo	August 16, 2025	NWA 77th Anniversary Show	Huntington, New York	1	294	Aired on tape delay as a special episode of Powerrr on November 4, 2025.	
97	Bryan Idol	June 6, 2026	Hard Times 6	Atlanta, Georgia	1	139+	Aired on tape delay as a special episode of Powerrr on August 15, 2026.	

== Combined reigns ==
As of October 23, 2026.

†	Indicates the current champion.
¤	The exact length of at least one title reign is uncertain, so the shortest possible length is used.

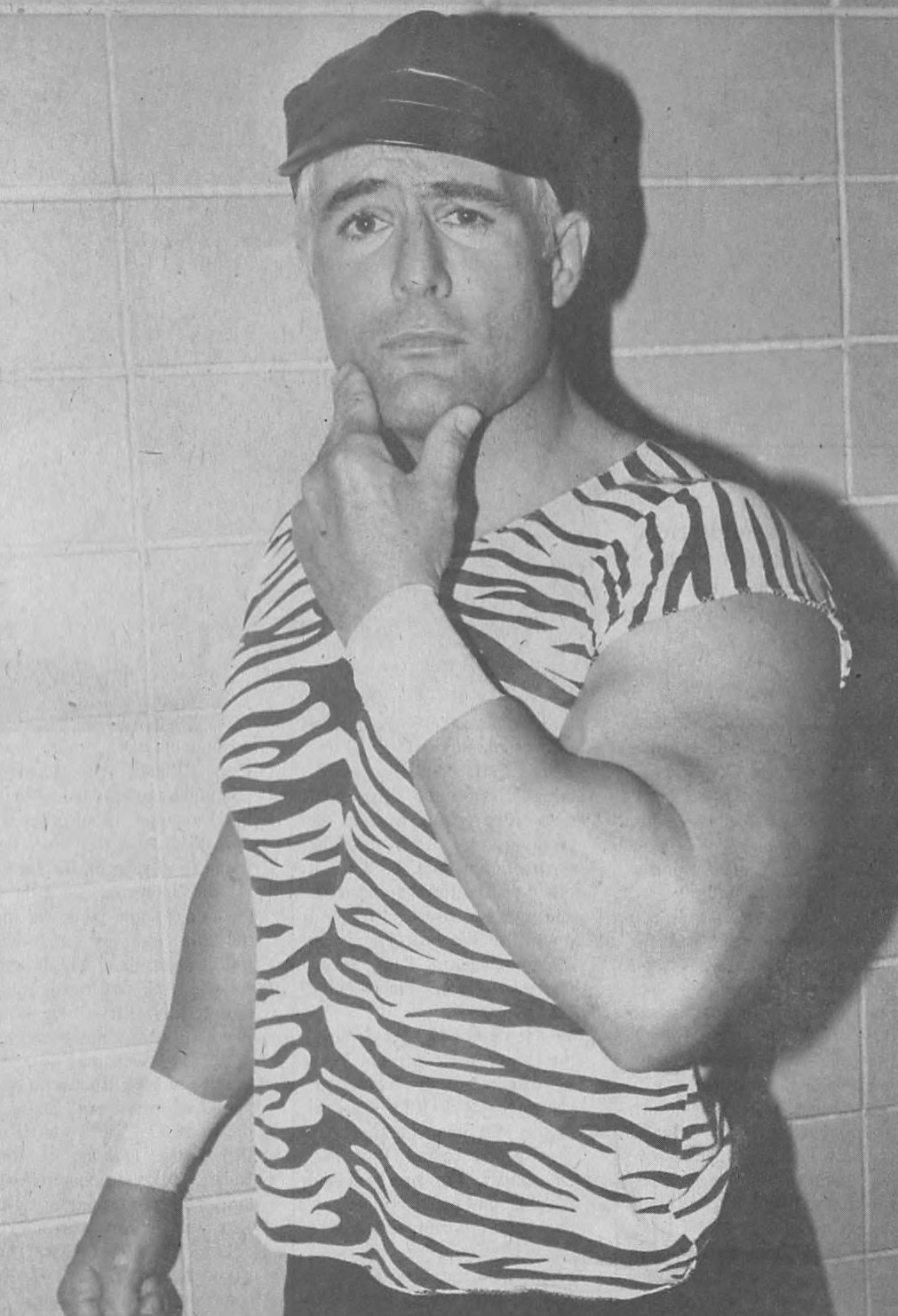
Inaugural NWA National Heavyweight Champion Austin Idol

Rank	Wrestler	No. of reigns	Combined days
1	Ricky Murdock	2	817
2	Phil Shatter	1	763
3	Doug Gilbert	2	596
4	Chance Prophet	2	564
5	Kahagas	2	469
6	Hotstuff Hernandez	1	455
7	Spyder	1	358
8	Mims	1	350
9	Chris Adonis	2	305
10	Mike Mondo	1	294
11	Don Brodie	2	291¤
12	Aron Stevens	1	290
13	Damien Wayne	3	279
14	Jax Dane	2	271
15	Crusher Hansen	2	270
16	Phil "Nitro" Monahan	3	267
17	Greg Anthony	3	245
18	Lou Marconi	3	243
19	Ron Garvin	1	233
20	Cyon	1	223
21	Austin Idol	1	221
22	Kory Williams	1	217
23	Kevin Northcutt	2	204
24	"Thrillbilly" Silas Mason	1	189
25	Willie Mack	1	188
26	Paul Orndorff	3	187
27	Thom Latimer	1	182
27	Trevor Murdoch	1	182
27	Big Bully Douglas	1	182
30	Ted DiBiase	2	181
30	Pepper Parks	1	181
32	Tully Blanchard	1	177
33	Arrick Andrews	1	175
34	Bryan Idol †	1	139+
35	Steve Olsonoski	1	139
36	Colt Cabana	2	137
37	Tommy Rich	3	128
38	EC3	1	127
39	Larry Zbyszko	3	125
40	Masked Superstar	3	118
41	Black Bart	1	113
41	Mongolian Stomper	1	113
43	Brad Armstrong	2	112
44	James Storm	1	94
45	Salvatore Sincere	1	85
46	Dusty Rhodes	1	75
47	Terry Knight	1	69
48	Terry Taylor	1	67
49	Stevie Richards	1	63
50	Big Slam	1	62
51	Jack Brisco	1	58
52	Brett Wayne	1	54
53	Stone Mountain	1	52
54	Buzz Sawyer	1	49
54	Vordell Walker	1	49
56	Jake Logan	1	42
57	Anthony Mayweather	1	36
58	Ron Bass	1	35
58	Super Destroyer	2	35
58	The Spoiler	1	35
61	Wahoo McDaniel	1	31
62	Mr. Wrestling II	1	28
63	Buddy Landel	1	21
63	John Saxon	1	21
65	Mustang Mike	1	7
66	Brandon K	1	4
67	Killer Tim Brooks	1	<1
67	Nikita Koloff	1	<1

== See also ==
- List of National Wrestling Alliance championships
- List of current champions in the National Wrestling Alliance
- NWA Canadian Heavyweight Championship, counterpart in Canada which also started as a regional championship
