= Crockett Cup (2026) =

2026 National Wrestling Alliance professional wrestling show

- Promotional poster
- Promotion: National Wrestling Alliance
- Date: April 4, 2026 (aired May 1, 2026, May 2, 2026, May 9, 2026, May 16, 2026, May 23, 2026)
- City: Forney, Texas
- Venue: The OC Theatre

Supercard chronology
← Previous; Samhain: Part 3	Next → Hard Times 6

Crockett Cup chronology
← Previous; 2025	Next → —

The 2026 iteration of the Crockett Cup was a professional wrestling tag team tournament produced by the National Wrestling Alliance (NWA). It was the ninth iteration in the Crockett Cup chronology. The event took place on April 4, 2026, at The OC Theatre in Forney, Texas, later airing on tape delay across several episodes of NWA Powerrr on Comet. The event celebrated the 40th anniversary of the first Crockett Cup tournament, which took place on April 19, 1986, at the Louisiana Superdome in New Orleans, Louisiana.

Reigning All Japan Pro-Wrestling (AJPW) World Tag Team Champions Titans of Calamity (Ren Ayabe and Talos) defeated The Country Gentlemen (AJ Cazana and KC Cazana) to win the titular tournament. The event was notable for NWA Commentator Joe Galli announcing a new media rights deal with Sinclair Broadcast Group to air NWA Powerrr on Comet, starting with a two-night premiere covering the Crockett Cup on May 1 and 2. This put the NWA back on over-the-air television for the first time since 1996.

== Production ==
=== Background ===
The Crockett Cup is a tag team tournament first held in April 1986. National Wrestling Alliance (NWA) member Jim Crockett Promotions (JCP), headed by Jim Crockett Jr., hosted the Crockett Cup, held in honor of Crockett's father, JCP founder Jim Crockett Sr. and saw participation of teams from various NWA territories. JCP held the tournament again in 1987 and 1988, before JCP was sold to Ted Turner later that year. In July 2017, the Crockett Foundation, with Classic Pro Wrestling, held the "Crockett Foundation Cup Tag Team Tournament" in New Kent, Virginia, which was not affiliated with the NWA. Bobby Fulton, The Barbarian, and The Rock 'n' Roll Express, all former Crockett Cup participants, took part in the event as a link to the original tournaments.

The original concept of the Crockett Cup was a single elimination tag team tournament, with the storyline prize of $1,000,000.00 given to the winning team along with a large trophy. The 1986 and 1987 tournaments featured 24 teams, while the 1988 version had 22 teams competing. Each tournament was split over two shows to encompass all 23 tournament matches as well as non-tournament matches; in 1986, JCP held a show in the afternoon and another in the evening, while the 1987 and 1988, the tournament was spread out over two days instead.

On February 6, 2026, the NWA announced that first-round matches for the Crockett Cup would take place at the February 21 NWA Powerrr tapings. Nine days later, on February 15, they announced that the rest of the tournament would take place on April 4, at The OC Theatre in Forney, Texas.

=== Storylines ===
The event featured professional wrestling matches that involve different wrestlers from pre-existing scripted feuds and storylines. Wrestlers portray heroes, villains, or less distinguishable characters in scripted events that built tension and culminate in a wrestling match or series of matches. Storylines were played out on the twenty-sixth season of the NWA's weekly series, Powerrr.

On March 15, NWA President William Patrick Corgan announced that All Japan Pro-Wrestling (AJPW) World Tag Team Champions Titans of Calamity (Ren Ayabe and Talos) would be entering the Crockett Cup. As late entrants, they would compete in a series of play in matches for the #16 seed in the tournament.

== Results ==
First episode (aired May 1, 2026)
No.	Results	Stipulations	Times
1	Titans of Calamity (Ren Ayabe and Talos) defeated Jack Valor and Eddie Grayson, Devastation Reborn (AJ Farat and Frank Stone), and Death Row Militia (Leo Fox and Colt Killbane) by pinfall	Four-way tag team match to determine the #16 seed in the Crockett Cup	2:49
2	Titans of Calamity (Ren Ayabe and Talos) defeated Sins n' Grins (Izzy James and Bam Bam Malone) by pinfall	Tag team play-in match to determine the #16 seed in the Crockett Cup	3:05
3	Gisele Shaw defeated Tiffany Nieves (c) (with Miss Starr and Gretta) by pinfall	Singles match for the NWA World Women's Television Championship	8:23
4	Titans of Calamity (Ren Ayabe and Talos) defeated The Immortals (Kratos and Odinson) by pinfall	Crockett Cup first round match	7:02
(c) / – the champion(s) heading into the match

Second episode (aired May 2, 2026)
No.	Results	Stipulations	Times
1	Mzry (with Brandon McCord) defeated Damian Fenrir by pinfall	Singles match to determine the number one contender to the NWA World Junior Heavyweight Championship	6:36
2	The Wrestling Machines (Mike Mondo and Spencer Slade) (with Aron Stevens) defeated The Southern Six (Kerry Morton and Alex Taylor) (with Ricky Morton) by submission	Crockett Cup quarterfinal match	6:58
3	The Country Gentlemen (AJ Cazana and KC Cazana) (with Joe Cazana) defeated The Colóns (Primo Colón and Epico Colón) by pinfall	Crockett Cup quarterfinal match	6:01
4	Pretty Boy Smooth (with Pastor C-Lo) defeated Trevor Murdoch by pinfall	Singles match	2:11

Third episode (aired May 9, 2026)
No.	Results	Stipulations	Times
1	The Good Brothers (Doc Gallows and Karl Anderson) defeated The Slimeballz (Sage Chantz and Tommy Rant) (with Aron Stevens) by pinfall	Crockett Cup quarterfinal match	5:43
2	Titans of Calamity (Ren Ayabe and Talos) defeated Thom Latimer and El Dragón Nihan by pinfall	Crockett Cup quarterfinal match	9:30
3	Tiffany Nieves won by last eliminating Gretta	Burke Invitational Gauntlet to determine the number one contender to the NWA World Women's Championship	21:30

=== Burke Invitational Gauntlet ===
Draw	Entrant	Eliminated by	Order	Method of Elimination	Eliminations
1	Haley J	Gretta	2	Pinfall	0
2	Kylie Paige	Tiffany Nieves	6	Pinfall	1
3	Shay KarMichael	Gretta	1	Pinfall	0
4	Gretta	Herself	7	Over the top rope	4
5	Kenzie Paige	Kylie Paige	5	Over the top rope	1
6	Morgan Mercy	Gretta	3	Over the top rope	0
7	Herra	Kenzie Paige	4	Pinfall	0
8	Tiffany Nieves	Winner	—	—	1

Fourth episode (aired May 16, 2026)
No.	Results	Stipulations	Times
1	Carson Drake (with Aron Stevens) defeated Wrecking Ball Legursky by pinfall	Singles match	5:30
2	The Country Gentlemen (AJ Cazana and KC Cazana) (with Joe Cazana) defeated The Good Brothers (Doc Gallows and Karl Anderson) by pinfall	Crockett Cup semifinal match	5:43
3	Titans of Calamity (Ren Ayabe and Talos) defeated The Wrestling Machines (Mike Mondo and Spencer Slade) (with Aron Stevens) by pinfall	Crockett Cup semifinal match	9:30
4	Natalia Markova (c) defeated Sirena Veil by pinfall	Singles match for the NWA World Women's Championship	5:30
5	Tiffany Nieves (with Miss Starr and Gretta) defeated Natalia Markova (c) by pinfall	Singles match for the NWA World Women's Championship; This was Nieves's Burke Invitational Gauntlet cash-in match.	0:21
(c) / – the champion(s) heading into the match

Fifth episode (aired May 23, 2026)
No.	Results	Stipulations	Times
1	Eric Smalls defeated Daisy Kill by pinfall	Kiss My Boots match	1:40
2	Silas Mason (c) (with Kerry Morton, Alex Taylor, and Ricky Morton) defeated Bryan Idol by pinfall	No Limits Falls Count Anywhere match for the NWA World's Heavyweight Championship	13:48
3	Titans of Calamity (Ren Ayabe and Talos) defeated The Country Gentlemen (AJ Cazana and KC Cazana) (with Joe Cazana) by pinfall	Crockett Cup final	9:39
(c) / – the champion(s) heading into the match

=== 2026 Crockett Cup tournament bracket ===
First round NWA Powerrr; February 21; Crockett Cup; April 4
1	The Immortals (Kratos and Odinson)	Pin
16	Titans of Calamity (Ren Ayabe and Talos)	7:02
8	Carson Bartholomew Drake and Tyler Stevens	6:58
9	Thom Latimer and El Dragón Nihan	Pin
5	The Southern Six (Kerry Morton and Alex Taylor)	Pin
12	The Hardway (Jack Vaughn and Dalton McKenzie)	5:49
4	The Wrestling Machines (Mike Mondo and Spencer Slade)	Sub
13	The Holy Grail Experience (Pretty Boy Smooth and Hayden Backlund)	6:33
6	The Country Gentlemen (AJ Cazana and KC Cazana)	Pin
11	Trevor Murdoch and Tyler Franks	4:03
3	The Colóns (Primo Colón and Epico Colón)	Pin
14	Red, White, and JAC'd (Wrecking Ball Legursky and JAC)	5:08
7	Da Pope and Mims	7:28
10	The Slimeballz (Sage Chantz and Tommy Rant)	Pin
2	The Good Brothers (Doc Gallows and Karl Anderson)	Pin
15	The McCord Collection (Zyon and Bonez)	5:09

Quarterfinals; Crockett Cup; April 4
16	Titans of Calamity (Ren Ayabe and Talos)	Pin
9	Thom Latimer and El Dragón Nihan	9:30
5	The Southern Six (Kerry Morton and Alex Taylor)	6:51
4	The Wrestling Machines (Mike Mondo and Spencer Slade)	Sub
6	The Country Gentlemen (AJ Cazana and KC Cazana)	Pin
3	The Colóns (Primo Colón and Epico Colón)	6:01
10	The Slimeballz (Sage Chantz and Tommy Rant)	5:43
2	The Good Brothers (Doc Gallows and Karl Anderson)	Pin

Semifinals; Crockett Cup; April 4
16	Titans of Calamity (Ren Ayabe and Talos)	Pin
4	The Wrestling Machines (Mike Mondo and Spencer Slade)	9:30
6	The Country Gentlemen (AJ Cazana and KC Cazana)	Pin
2	The Good Brothers (Doc Gallows and Karl Anderson)	5:43

Final; Crockett Cup; April 4
16	Titans of Calamity (Ren Ayabe and Talos)	Pin
6	The Country Gentlemen (AJ Cazana and KC Cazana)	9:39

== See also ==
- 2026 in professional wrestling
