= Kahagas =

Japanese-American professional wrestler (born 1973)

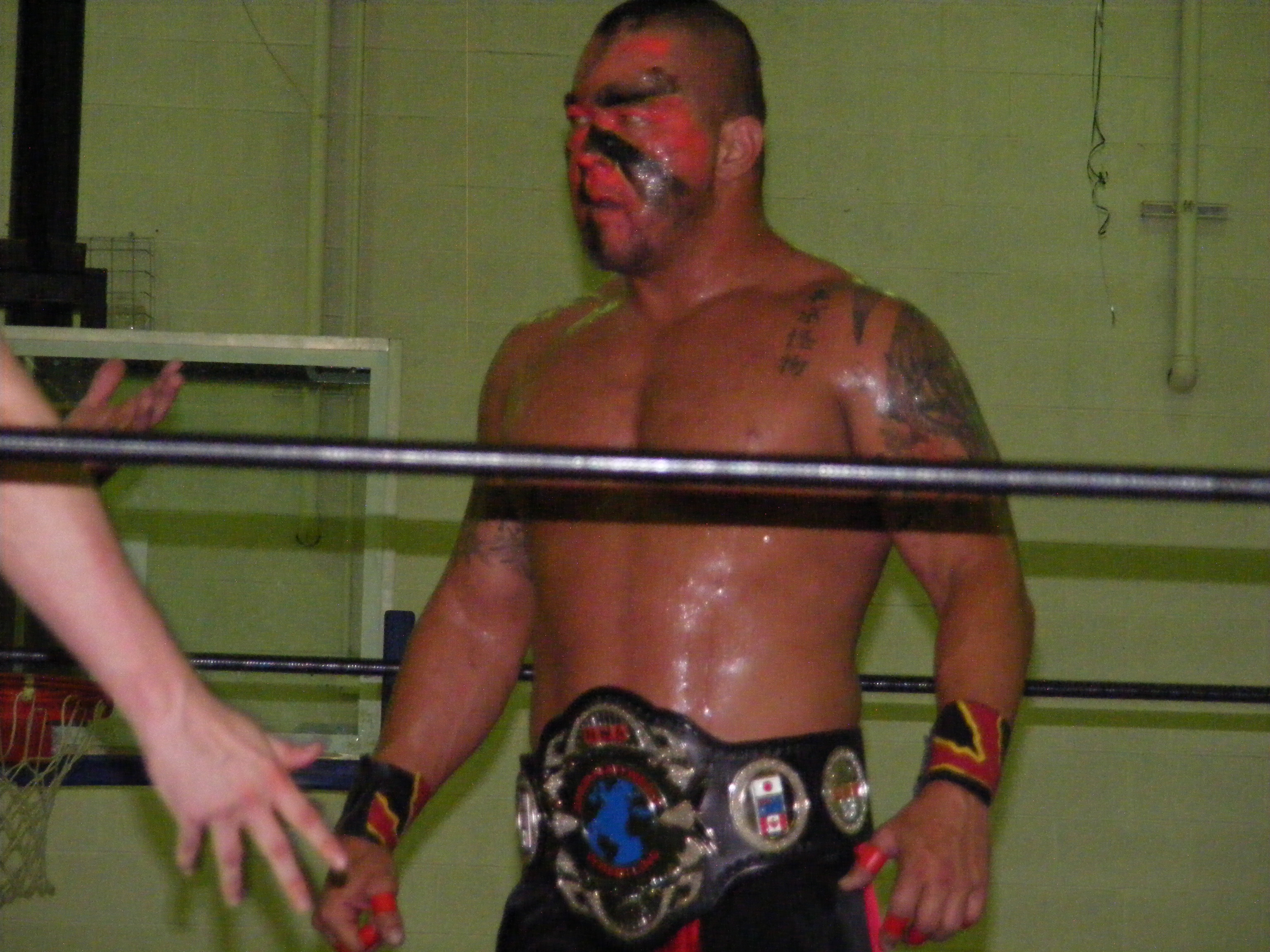
- Kahagas in April 2012

Personal information
- Born: July 15, 1973 (age 53) Tokyo, Japan

Professional wrestling career
- Ring name: Kahagas
- Billed height: 5 ft 11 in (1.80 m)
- Billed weight: 205 lb (93 kg)
- Trained by: Héctor Guerrero; Prince Iaukea; Tom Horne; Tyree Pride; John Tenta
- Debut: 2000

Kahagas (born July 15, 1973) is a Japanese-American professional wrestler. He currently wrestles on the independent circuit and is a former NWA National Heavyweight Champion, NWA North American Heavyweight Champion and NWA World Heavyweight Champion.

== Career ==
=== Full Impact Pro (2003–2006) ===
Kahagas made his debut for Full Impact Pro's Inaugural Show, defeating Dagon Briggs and Thunderbolt Norton. In his first year of wrestling, Kahagas feuded with Dagon Briggs and Brian Gamble with the latter of which he came out on top of. On April 9, 2003, he won the Jersey Championship Wrestling (JCW) Lightweight Championship defeating Shawn Sherdian. With FIP being the sister promotion to Ring of Honor, FIP wrestlers could also wrestle at ROH shows and Kahagas was no different, at Glory By Honor Kahagas lost a six-man mayhem match which was won by Trent Acid. In September, Kahagas participated in the FIP Heavyweight Championship tournament, making the second round before being eliminated by Rainman. Kahagas continued to wrestler for FIP until March 2006, in his last match he defeated Kenny King.

=== Coastal Championship Wrestling (2005–2012) ===
On July 16, 2005, Kahagas made his debut for Coastal Championship Wrestling, losing to Dok Rivers. He performed sporadically for CCW in 2005 before becoming an active member in 2006. In June 2006, Kahagas wrestled legendary wrestler Jake Roberts in a losing effort. After this Kahagas was thrust into the Southeastern Heavyweight Championship picture. After two unsuccessful attempts at the champion Joey Machete, Kahagas finally beat him for the title on September 16. Kahagas remained champion for over a year but would retain most because of disqualification, during his remain he took on many former WWE wrestlers including Jimmy Snuka and D'Lo Brown. He lost the title to JB Cool in November 2007. Kahagas would become a two time Southeastern Heavyweight Championship when he defeated JT Flash on July 26, 2008. After holding the title for 11 months, he would finally lose it to Pablo Marquez. In 2010, he would shift his focus to CCW Heavyweight Championship, defeating Scotty 2 Hotty for the championship. Kahagas would hold the title for 774 days before vacating the title in late early 2012. His final appearance for CCW came on June 16, 2012 where he lost a fatal four way for the CCW Heavyweight Championship which Pablo Marquez won.

=== Florida Underground Wrestling (2010–present) ===
Kahagas made his debut in Florida Underground Wrestling (FUW) on November 2, 2010, defeating Jimmy Whiplash. Kahagas was undefeated until April 12, 2011 when he and Bruce Santee were defeated by Dakota Darsow and The Cuban Assassin. On May 10, 2011, Kahagas and Sideshow were defeated by the FUW Tag Team Champions Darsow and Kennedy Kendrick. On May 17, 2011, Kahagas was eliminated in a 25-Man Florida Underground Rumble for the Heavyweight Championship, which was won by The Cuban Assassin. On May 31, 2011, Kahagas wrestled in a match for the Heavyweight title, also involving Sideshow, but the winner was The Cuban Assassin. From June 2011, Kahagas remained undefeated before losing to Michael Tarver on March 25, 2012. With this lost, he took on Tarver for his FUW Bruiserweight Championship which he won via DQ therefore did not become champion. In the summer 2012, Kahagas started a feud with FUW Heavyweight Champion Bruce Santee, which included several championship matches where both Santee's FUW Heavyweight Championship and Kahagas's NWA National Heavyweight Championship were on the line. On June 28, 2012, Kahagas defeated Santee, winning the FUW Heavyweight Championship. On November 2, 2012, he vacated the FUW Heavyweight Championship.

=== National Wrestling Alliance ===
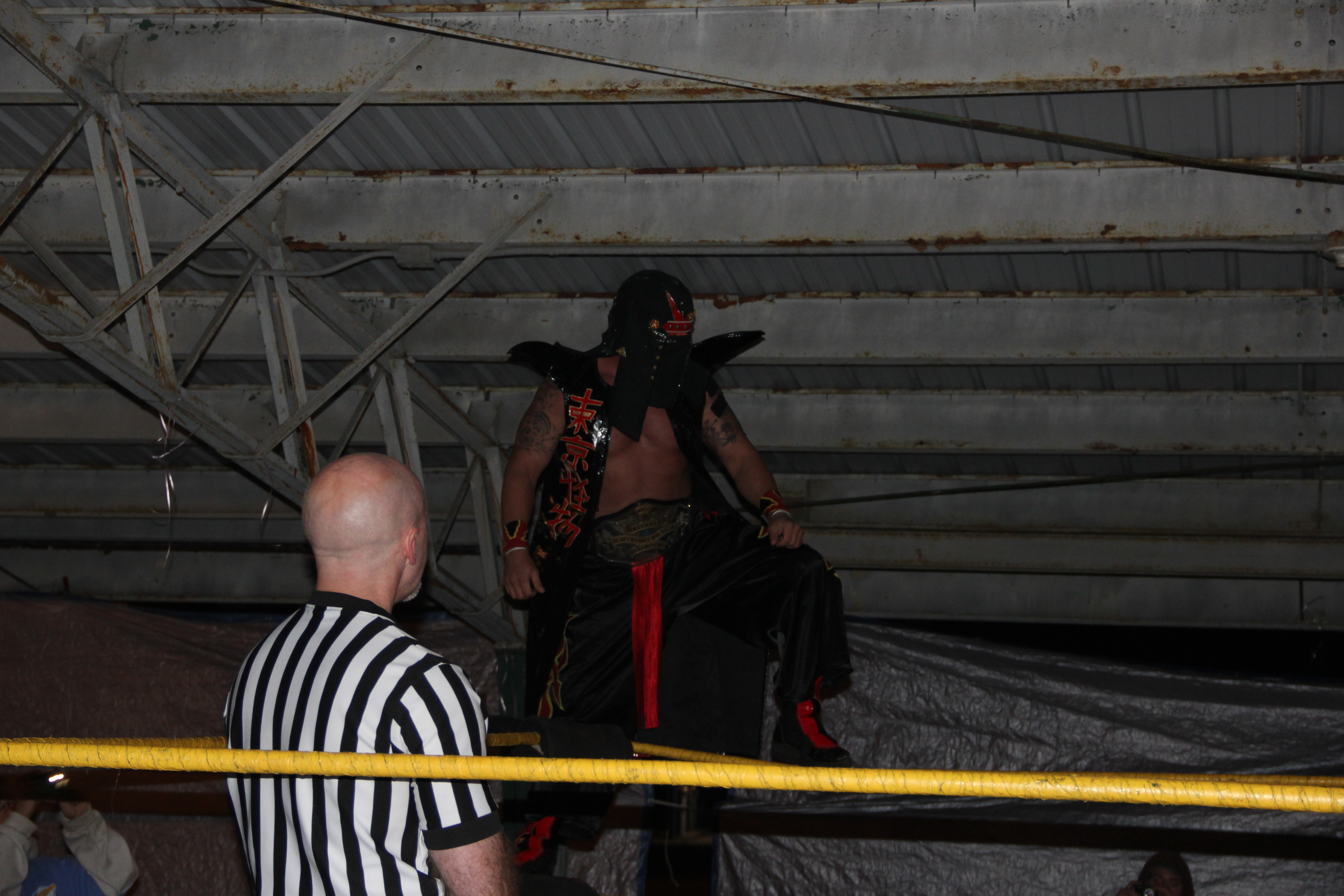
Kahagas with his in ring attire.

Kahagas started to wrestle within National Wrestling Alliance promotions on December 14, 2011. He and the NWA National Heavyweight Champion Chance Prophet wrestled to double disqualification on two occasions, however, Kahagas finally defeated Prophet for the title on March 29, 2012 in a Four Corners Weapons Russian Chain Match. On April 6, 2012, he successfully defended his championship against NWA World Heavyweight Champion "Scrap Iron" Adam Pearce. On April 14, 2012, he wrestled in a "Champion vs. Champion" match against the NWA World Junior Champion Kevin Douglas, which resulted in a simultaneous double pinfall resulting in a draw. On November 2, 2012, Kahagas won a 9 Way Elimination match on a Dangerous Adrenaline Wrestling Gladiators event to win the vacant NWA World Heavyweight Championship. Participants included Lance Erikson and Chance Prophet (Prophet was vocal after being informed he was not being crowned champion alleging promises were made to be made champion) Following the win, Kahagas vacated the NWA National Heavyweight Championship. On March 16, 2013, Kahagas lost the NWA World Heavyweight Championship to Rob Conway. On April 20, Kahagas defeated Byron Wilcott to win the NWA North American Heavyweight Championship. With this victory, he became the first wrestler to win the National, North American, and World Heavyweight Championships. On November 1, 2013, Kahagas retained the title to Francisco Ciatso at FUW Throwdown 8. Two days later, retained the title against Rafi Rex. On November 30, 2013, Kahagas retained the title against Jeff Boom by DQ. In 2016 he went to AIWF and won the AIWF World Title.

== Championships and accomplishments ==
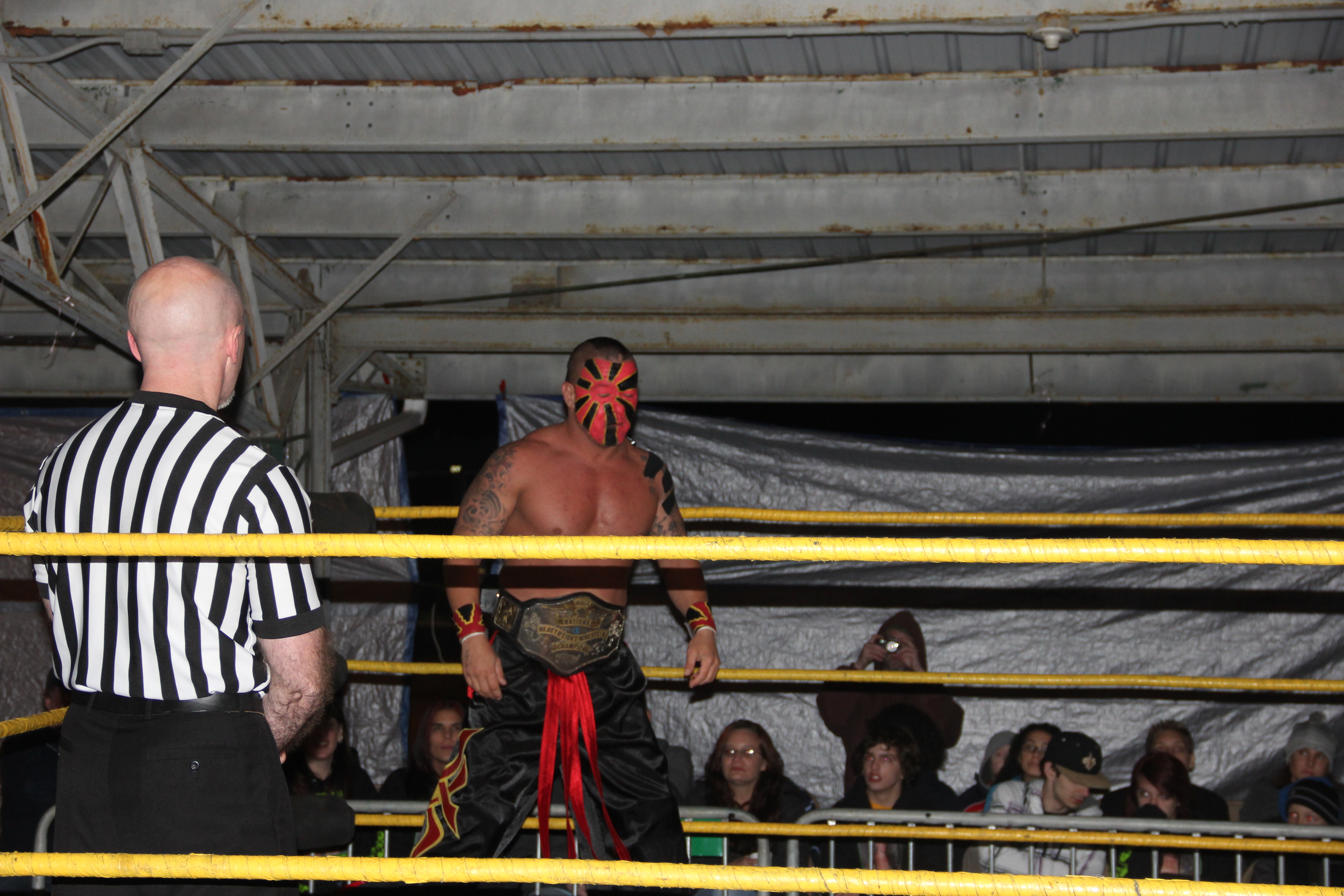
Kahagas as the NWA National Heavyweight Champion.

- Allied Independent Wrestling Federations
  - AIWF World Heavyweight Championship (1 time)
  - AIWF Northeast Championship (1 time, inaugural)
  - AIWF Northeast Title Tournament (2016)
- Gangrel's Wrestling Asylum
  - GWA Heavyweight Championship (1 time)
- Brew City Wrestling
  - BCW Heavyweight Championship (1 time)
- Cauliflower Alley Club
  - Men's Wrestling Award (2017)
- Coastal Championship Wrestling
  - CCW Heavyweight Championship (1 time)
  - Southeastern Heavyweight Championship (2 times)
- Florida Underground Wrestling
  - FUW Heavyweight Championship (1 time)
- High Voltage Wrestling
  - HVW Midwest Heavyweight Championship (1 time)
  - HVW Livewire Championship (1 time)
- Independent Wrestling Association Florida
  - IWA Florida Junior Heavyweight Championship (1 time)
- Jersey Championship Wrestling
  - JCW Lightweight Championship (1 time, final)
- National Wrestling Alliance
  - NWA National Heavyweight Championship (2 times)
  - NWA North American Heavyweight Championship (1 time)
  - NWA Worlds Heavyweight Championship (1 time)
- New World Wrestling Extreme
  - NWWE Heavyweight Championship (2 times)
- Pro Wrestling Illustrated
  - PWI ranked him #165 of the 500 best singles wrestlers of the year in the PWI 500 in 2013
- Southern Illinois Championship Wrestling
  - SICW Classic Championship (1 time)
- Southwest Wrestling Entertainment
  - SWE Heavyweight Championship (1 time)
- WWNLive
  - WWN Proving Ground Heavyweight Championship (1 time)
- Vendetta Pro Wrestling
  - Cauliflower Alley Cup (2015)
  - Casino Royale Rumble (2016)
- Wrecking Ball Wrestling
  - Match of the Year (2012) vs. Tony Martin
- Pennsylvania Wrestling Alliance
  - PWA Heavyweight Championship (1 time)
- Other Titles
  - WFWA Heavyweight Championship (1 time)
  - Golden Fist World Championship (1 time)
