= NWA 70th Anniversary Show =

2018 National Wrestling Alliance pay-per-view event

- Official poster for the anniversary show
- Promotion: National Wrestling Alliance
- Date: October 21, 2018
- City: Nashville, Tennessee
- Venue: Tennessee State Fairgrounds Arena

Event chronology
← Previous; First	Next → New Years Clash

NWA Anniversary Show chronology
← Previous; 60th	Next → 73rd

The NWA 70th Anniversary Show was a professional wrestling supercard that took place on October 21, 2018 at the Tennessee State Fairgrounds Arena in Nashville, Tennessee. It was the first event produced under the NWA banner since William Patrick Corgan became the new owner of the organization. The event was co-produced with Global Force Entertainment and was streamed live on FITE TV.

In the main event, Nick Aldis defeated Cody in a two-out-of-three falls match to regain the NWA Worlds Heavyweight Championship. On the undercard, Willie Mack defeated Sam Shaw in the finals of a tournament for the vacant NWA National Heavyweight Championship. Also on the show, NWA World Women's Champion Jazz successfully defended her championship against Penelope Ford. The show featured a total of nine matches, with one match taking place before the show was broadcast live.

== Production ==
=== Background ===
The National Wrestling Alliance (NWA) was founded in 1948 by several regional professional wrestling promoters to produce an overall governing body for various professional wrestling promotions across the United States. In May 2017, William Patrick Corgan, lead singer of the Smashing Pumpkins, purchased the NWA via his company Lightning One, Inc., including NWA's name, rights, trademarks, and championship belts. The ownership took full effect on October 1, 2017. In its first year under Corgan's ownership, the NWA partnered up with various independent promotions to hold matches promote events. In the summer of 2018, NWA announced that they would hold their first Pay Per View (PPV) event to commemorate the 70th anniversary of the NWA. The event would be produced by Jeff Jarrett's Global Force Entertainment production company. It was available live and on-demand replay on FITE TV.

=== Storylines ===
Other on-screen personnel
Role:	Name:
Commentators	Jim Cornette
Commentators	Joe Galli
Commentators	Tony Schiavone
Ring announcers	Cyrus Fees
Referees	Earl Hebner
Referees	Brian Hebner
Interviewers	Jenn Decker

The NWA 70th Anniversary Show featured nine professional wrestling matches scripted by the NWA and the Tried-N-True Wrestling (TNT) promotion, with some of the wrestlers involved in scripted feuds leading to the matches. The wrestlers portray either heels (those that play the part of the "bad guys"), faces ('the "good guy" characters) or "tweeners" (who straddle the line between face and heel) as they perform in and out of the ring. Storylines were played out through the NWA's Ten Pounds of Gold documentary series on YouTube.

In the lead up to the All In pay-per-view (PPV) event, it was officially announced that NWA Worlds Heavyweight Champion Nick Aldis would defend the championship against Cody as part of the show. In the lead up to All In, Cody challenged for the ROH World Championship at Ring of Honor's Best in the World, but he failed to win the match, even with Aldis trying to help Cody win the match. Cody received a second title opportunity during the June 30 tapings of Ring of Honor Wrestling but lost again. At All In, Cody defeated Aldis to become the 96th overall NWA Worlds Heavyweight Champion. Following All In, Nick Aldis defeated Doug Williams to earn the rights to challenge for the NWA Worlds Heavyweight Championship once more. After Aldis' victory, the NWA announced that Nick Aldis would get his championship rematch at the NWA 70th Anniversary Show under best two-out-of-three falls rules.

When Billy Corgan purchased the NWA, the company declared that all NWA branded championships were vacated, except for the NWA Worlds Heavyweight Championship (held by Tim Storm at the time) and the NWA World Women's Championship, held by Jazz. For the NWA 70th Anniversary Show, the NWA announced that Penelope Ford would be the official challenger for the women's championship. While the World male and female champions were recognized, the NWA had vacated the NWA National Heavyweight Championship held by Kahagas at the time of Corgan's purchase. They announced that the championship would be brought back as part of the 70th Anniversary Show, with an eight-man tournament to crown a new champion which would include Jay Bradley, Colt Cabana, Sammy Guevara, Mike Parrow, Scorpio Sky, Sam Shaw, Ricky Starks, and Willie Mack.

== Results ==
No.	Results	Stipulations	Times
1^{D}	James Ellsworth defeated Karim Brigante (with Miss Monica) by pinfall	Singles match	7:43
2	Sam Shaw defeated Colt Cabana, Sammy Guevara and Scorpio Sky by pinfall	NWA National Heavyweight Championship Tournament semifinal four-way elimination match	7:05
3	Barrett Brown defeated Laredo Kid by pinfall	Singles match	10:05
4	Willie Mack defeated Jay Bradley, Mike Parrow and Ricky Starks by pinfall	NWA National Heavyweight Championship Tournament semifinal four-way elimination match	7:35
5	Tim Storm defeated Peter Avalon (with Niko Marquez) by pinfall	Kiss My Foot match	5:45
6	Jazz (c) defeated Penelope Ford by submission	Singles match for the NWA World Women's Championship	7:30
7	Willie Mack defeated Sam Shaw by pinfall	NWA National Heavyweight Championship Tournament final for the vacant NWA National Heavyweight Championship	9:55
8	Crimson and Jax Dane (with Road Warrior Animal) defeated The Kingdom of Jocephus (Shannon Moore and Crazzy Steve) (with Jocephus) by pinfall	Tag team Open Challenge	4:35
9	Nick Aldis (with Kamille Kaine) defeated Cody (c) (with Brandi Rhodes) 2–1	Two-out-of-three falls match for the NWA Worlds Heavyweight Championship	36:40
(c) / – the champion(s) heading into the match; D / – this was a dark match

=== Two-out-of-three falls match ===
Score	Winner	Decision	Notes	Time
1–0	Nick Aldis	Submission	Cody was forced to submit to the "King’s Cloverleaf"	14:10
1–1	Cody	Pinfall	Cody pinned Nick Aldis with the "Cross Rhodes"	27:40
2–1	Nick Aldis	Pinfall	Nick Aldis pinned Cody with a roll-up	36:40
