= Silas Mason (wrestler) =

American professional wrestler (born 1991)

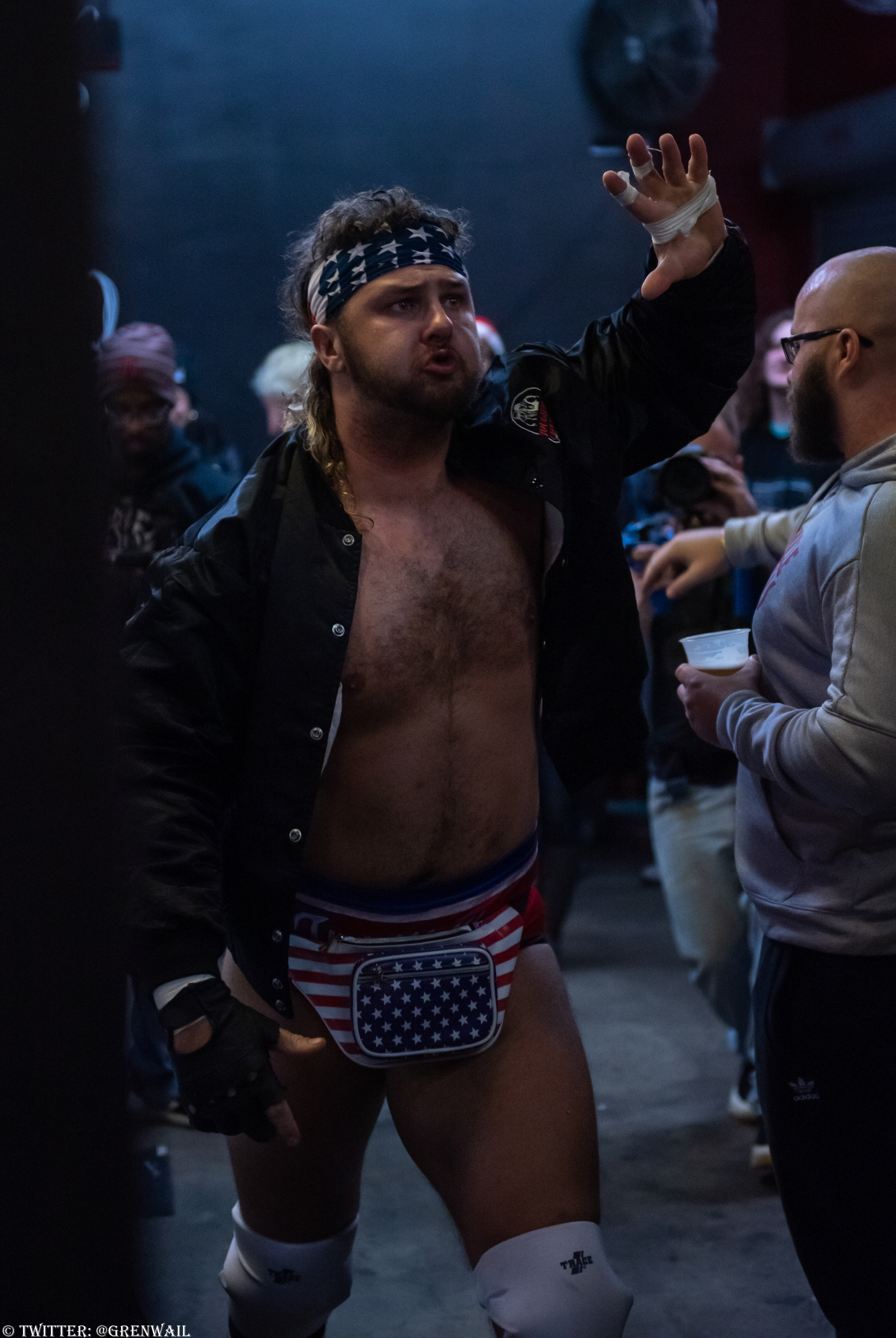
- Mason in December 2019

Personal information
- Born: 24 December 1991 (age 34) Las Vegas, Nevada, United States

Professional wrestling career
- Ring name: Kassius Koonz Thrillbilly Silas Silas Mason "Thrillbilly" Silas Mason
- Billed height: 196 cm (6 ft 5 in)
- Billed weight: 121 kg (267 lb)
- Trained by: Chase Owens Derek Drexl Doctor Cleaver Jeremy Blanchard
- Debut: 2015

Silas Mason is an American professional wrestler. He is signed to the National Wrestling Alliance (NWA), where he is the current NWA Worlds Heavyweight Champion in his first reign. He also makes appearances on the independent circuit.

== Professional wrestling career ==
=== American independent circuit (2015–present) ===
==== West Coast Wrestling Connection (2015–2016) ====
Mason made his professional wrestling debut at a house show promoted by West Coast Wrestling Connection (WCWC) on August 15, 2015, where he competed in a number one contendership Battle royal for the WCWC Pacific Northwest Championship won by Jorel Nelson. He spent roughly one year in the promotion, having chased for various titles such as the WCWC Tag Team and Pacific Northwest Championship but was unsuccessful.

==== IWA Mid-South (2017–2021) ====
Mason shared a four-year tenure with IWA Mid-South, having made his debut in the promotion at IWA Mid-South Happy Hellidays on December 7, 2017, where he teamed up with Devan Dixon as "The Mason Dixon Line" and fell short to Horrorshow (Calvin Tankman and Shane Mercer).

During his time with the promotion, he chased for various accomplishments. He won the IWA Mid-South Tag Team Championship alongside tag team partner Devan Dixon on January 2, 2021 at Out With The Old, In With The New by defeating Mama's Boiz (Joe Travis and Joshie Boy). At IWA Mid-South Heartbreak on February 11, 2021, he and Devan Dixon dropped the IWA Mid-South Tag Team Championship in a tag team gauntlet match to The PD Express (Logan James and Tyler Matrix).

==== National Wrestling Alliance (2022–present) ====
Mason debuted in the National Wrestling Alliance at NWA Powerrr #70 on June 13, 2022, where he fell short to Trevor Murdoch.

He made his pay-per-view debut at Nuff Said on February 11, 2023, where he defeated Kratos in singles competition. Two days later on February 13, 2023, Mason announced that he had signed a contract with the promotion while accompanied by a picture of himself shaking hands with NWA President Billy Corgan.

At NWA 312 on April 7, 2023, Mason won a Bob Luce Memorial Battle Royal to become the number one contender to the NWA National Heavyweight Championship by last eliminating Odinson, bout also involving notable opponents such as Jordan Clearwater, Rhett Titus and Homicide. At night one of the NWA 75th Anniversary Show on August 26, 2023, Mason defeated Odinson and J. R. Kratos in a triple threat match to win the NWA National Championship. At night two of the event from August 27, Mason successfully defended the NWA National Championship against Jordan Clearwater, who won a battle royal during the event's pre-show to challenge for the title.

Mason was presented the new NWA/JCP Southeastern Heavyweight title on February 9, 2024 at a NWA Southeast live event. He subsequently defended the title multiple times, including a match against Jay Bradley for NWA Southeast in April 2024.

At NWA Samhain, Mason retained his NWA National Championship by defeating Chris Adonis. On the March 19th episode of NWA Powerrr, Mason relinquished the NWA National Championship in order to pursue a match with EC3 for the NWA Worlds Heavyweight Championship. In March 2024, Mason lost his home and possessions in a house fire. A GoFundMe fundraiser was set up by Kerry Morton to support Mason following the event.

At NWA Hard Times 2024, episode 5, which debuted on The CW app May 7, 2024, Mason was unsuccessful in challenging EC3 for the NWA Worlds Heavyweight Championship. In the 2024 Crockett Cup, Mason teamed up with "The Southern 6" stablemate Kerry Morton and defeated The Slimeballz (Sage Chantz and Tommy Rant) in the first rounds. Mason got injured mid-tournament and had to be replaced by Alex Taylor, with whom Morton won the entire competition. Mason was not recognized as co-winner.

The NWA announced on July 18, 2024, that Mason, along with his Southern Six stablemates Kerry Morton and Alex Taylor, had signed exclusive contracts with the NWA. Additionally, it was confirmed that all three members will appear at the NWA 76th Anniversary Show. A the NWA 77th Anniversary Show, Mason defeated Thom Latimer to become the NWA World's Heavyweight champion, and becoming the first 90's born NWA worlds Heavyweight champion.

Mason scored his first pay-per-view defense of the title at NWA Samhain: Part 3 on January 27, 2026 (aired) by defeating Matt Cardona. Mason continued to defend and retain the championship at major NWA events such as the 2026 Crockett Cup against Bryan Idol and NWA Hard Times 6 against Kerry Morton. In June 2026, Mason successfully defended his title against Shotaro Ashino at All Japan Pro Wreslting's Super Power Series 2026. The title defense was the first Japanese defense of the NWA World's Heavyweight championship in more than two years.

== Other media ==
Mason made his feature film debut as Terry Gordy in the 2023 biographical film The Iron Claw, starring Zac Efron. In buildup to the Solar eclipse of April 8, 2024, Mason was featured in a commercial for MoonPie as The Sun.

== Championships and accomplishments ==
- IWA Mid-South
  - IWA Mid-South Tag Team Championship (1 time) – with Devon Dixon
- National Wrestling Alliance
  - NWA World's Heavyweight Championship (1 time, current)
  - NWA National Championship (1 time)
- NWA Southeast/Joe Cazana Promotions
  - NWA/JCP Southeastern Heavyweight Championship (1 time)
- Pro Wrestling Illustrated
  - Ranked No. 32 of the top 500 singles wrestlers in the PWI 500 in 2026
