= NWA Powerrr =

American professional wrestling television program

- The NWA Powerrr logo
- Genre: Professional wrestling
- Created by: Billy Corgan; David Lagana
- Presented by: Joe Galli (play-by-play commentator); Tim Storm (color commentator); Danny Dealz (color commentator)
- Opening theme: Seasons 1–2 & 4–5: "Into the Fire" by Dokken; Season 3: "I'm Broken" by Pantera; Seasons 6–15: "When Our Shadows Fall" by Jeff Schroeder (feat. Michael Angelo Batio); Seasons 16–17: "Wyttch" by The Smashing Pumpkins; Season 18: "In Lieu of Failure" by The Smashing Pumpkins
- Country of origin: United States
- Original language: English
- No. of seasons: 27
- No. of episodes: 269 (list of episodes)

Production
- Producers: Billy Corgan (Owner/President); Billy Trask (Director of Television)
- Camera setup: Multicamera setup
- Running time: 60 minutes
- Production companies: Lightning One, Inc.

Original release
- Network: YouTube
- Release: October 8, 2019 – March 3, 2020
- Network: FITE TV
- Release: March 21, 2021 – December 20, 2022
- Network: YouTube
- Release: January 3, 2023 – January 9, 2024
- Network: The CW app
- Release: February 6 – September 24, 2024
- Network: X
- Release: October 1, 2024 – July 8, 2025
- Network: Roku Sports Channel
- Release: July 29, 2025 – April 28, 2026
- Network: Comet
- Release: May 1, 2026 – present

NWA Powerrr is a professional wrestling television program produced by the National Wrestling Alliance (NWA) that premiered on October 8, 2019. As of May 1, 2026, the series airs on Comet. On July 9, 2026 the series began airing on Tubi

Powerrr features wrestlers performing in matches and getting interviewed. These elements together create and further the storylines of the NWA while building towards the promotion's events.

== History ==
On May 1, 2017, Billy Corgan bought the National Wrestling Alliance, including its name, rights, trademarks and championship belts. Full ownership took effect on October 1, 2017. Corgan, Vice President Dave Lagana, and their production team would rebuild the NWA brand, acknowledging its history from its original inception in 1948, while gradually transitioning into a singular entity.

In September 2019, NWA announced tapings for a weekly television show, later revealed to be titled NWA Powerrr. The first tapings were held on September 30 and October 1 at the GPB Studios in Atlanta, Georgia, which has since been dubbed the "NWA Arena." The series would debut on October 8, 2019 on the NWA's YouTube channel. The program's air time, 6:05 PM, is a call back to the classic World Championship Wrestling show by former NWA member Jim Crockett Promotions that would air at 6:05 PM on Saturdays from the early 1970s until 1992. WOAI-TV San Antonio news reporter Joe Galli and longtime pro-wrestling manager/executive Jim Cornette were the initial commentators. Championship Wrestling from Hollywood owner David Marquez serves as an interviewer and ring announcer. Kyle Durden serves as backstage interviewer.

Following the November 19 episode of NWA Powerrr being listed, it was quickly taken down due to remarks by Cornette which some deemed racist. NWA released a statement the next day stating that Cornette resigned. He was subsequently replaced by Stu Bennett who joined Galli on commentary beginning with NWA's December 14 pay-per-view, Into the Fire.

=== 2021–present ===
After the NWA went on a hiatus due to the COVID-19 pandemic, television tapings for Powerrr would resume in March 2021 as part of a new distribution agreement with FITE TV. On Tuesday, April 13, the NWA debuted a companion series titled Powerrr Surge, which features additional wrestler interviews, unseen matches, and recaps from the previous Powerrr episodes.

On January 5, 2022, the NWA announced that Power would return to YouTube, airing on Fridays after the Tuesday premiere on FITE. In January 2023, Power returned to Tuesday nights on YouTube.

On October 23, it was reported that NWA signed a deal with The CW to air Powerrr on the CW app. Powerrr debuted on the CW app on February 6, 2024.

In February 2024, Powerrr was given the 2023 "Worst Television Show" award by Wrestling Observer Newsletter.

Episodes of Powerrr expired on the CW app on September 30, 2024. The program began what was reported as a five-week run on X with the episode that aired October 1, 2024. Powerrr continued to air on X into mid-2025. On July 29, 2025, Powerrr began streaming for free on The Roku Channel in the United States, Canada, and Mexico, putting it head-to-head against WWE's NXT on Tuesdays, which airs on The CW. On April 4, 2026, the NWA announced that they would be airing Powerrr on the Sinclair Broadcasting-owned Comet network beginning on May 1, 2026.

== Episodes ==
For its first fifteen seasons, Powerrr focused on storylines leading into then-upcoming pay-per-view events. With the discontinuation of live broadcasts following the show's move to The CW app, the sixteenth season onward would be taped during the NWA's Signature Live Events.

The third season was to culminate with the Crockett Cup, but the event was cancelled due to the 2020 COVID-19 pandemic.

== On-air personalities ==
In addition to the wrestlers (male and female), managers/valets, and referees, the show features various on-air personalities including authority figures, commentators, ring announcers, and backstage interviewers.

=== Authority figures ===
Authority figures	Position	Dates	Notes
William Patrick Corgan	Owner/President	October 8, 2019 - present	NWA's owner and president.

=== Commentators ===
Commentators	Dates	Notes
Joe Galli and Jim Cornette	October 8, 2019 – December 3, 2019	Both were interviewers as well. Cornette resigned by the end of the first season.
Joe Galli and Stu Bennett	December 15, 2019 – August 26, 2020	Both are interviewers as well. Bennett signed back with WWE in August thus leaving NWA.
Kyle Davis and Stu Bennett	January 21, 2020	Davis briefly filled in for Joe Galli.
Joe Galli, Tim Storm, and Velvet Sky	March 24, 2021 – June 13, 2023	
Joe Galli, Madusa, and Velvet Sky	February 15, 2022 - February 22, 2022	Madusa briefly filled in for Storm.
Joe Galli, Austin Idol, and Velvet Sky	April 5, 2022; July 12, 2022	Idol briefly filled in for Storm, who was competing that night.
Joe Galli, William Patrick Corgan, and Velvet Sky	May 3, 2022	Corgan briefly filled in for Storm.
Joe Galli, Austin Idol, and Tyrus	May 17, 2022	
Joe Galli, Tim Storm, and Tyrus	May 24, 2022	
Joe Galli, Tim Storm, and Madusa	May 31, 2022	
Joe Galli, Tim Storm, and Austin Idol	June 7, 2022	
Joe Galli, Pat Kenney, and William Patrick Corgan	April 11, 2023	Special recap show for NWA 312
Joe Galli, Tim Storm and Danny Dealz	April 18, 2023 – May 30, 2023; December 30, 2025 – present	
Joe Galli and Tim Storm	July 11, 2023 – August 22, 2023	
Joe Galli and Danny Dealz	September 5, 2023 – December 23, 2025	
Joe Galli, Tim Storm and The Pope	May 1, 2025 – May 23, 2025	

=== Ring announcers ===
Ring announcers	Dates	Notes
David Marquez	October 8, 2019 – May 12, 2020	Also an interviewer.
Kyle Davis	March 24, 2021 – present	Also an interviewer.

=== Backstage interviewers ===
Backstage interviewers	Dates	Notes
Kyle Davis	October 8, 2019 – present	Fills in on commentary when needed.
May Valentine	March 24, 2021 – October 31, 2024	

== See also ==
- NWA USA
- List of professional wrestling television series
