= Strictly Business (professional wrestling) =

Professional wrestling stable

Stable
- Leader: Nick Aldis
- Members: Royce Isaacs; Thom Latimer; Kamille; Scott Steiner; Chris Adonis; May Valentine
- Name(s): Strictly Business; Team Aldis
- Debut: December 15, 2019
- Years active: 2019–2023

Strictly Business were a villainous professional wrestling stable in the National Wrestling Alliance (NWA), last consisting of Chris Adonis, Thom Latimer and Kamille.

The group was formed and led by then-NWA World Heavyweight Champion Nick Aldis on the tenth episode of Powerrr on December 17, 2019, and was quickly established as NWA's top villainous faction with the addition of The Wild Cards (Royce Isaacs and Thom Latimer) and Kamille. The faction gained further credibility with the addition of major names such as Scott Steiner and Chris Adonis. The group dominated NWA until 2021 when Aldis lost his title after a three-year long reign. Shortly after the title loss, Aldis was kicked out of the group due to fending off their attack against Tim Storm, reducing the group to Adonis, Latimer and Kamille.

== History ==
=== Nick Aldis' leadership (2019–2021) ===
On the December 17 episode of Powerrr, the season premiere of season two, the World Heavyweight Champion Nick Aldis confronted longtime rival Tim Storm and warned him for repeatedly calling his name on commentary which led to The Wild Cards (Royce Isaacs and Thom Latimer) and Kamille attacking Storm in the ring and forming a new alliance with Aldis. The episode also featured the beginning of Aldis' feud with Ricky Morton during an interview segment where Morton mentioned that Aldis needed to go a long way to match the legacy of NWA legends which infuriated Aldis. The following episode of Powerrr featured the NWA debut of Isaacs' on-screen girlfriend May Valentine, thus directly adding her as a part of Aldis' faction. On the January 1, 2020 episode of Powerrr, Aldis named the group "Strictly Business" during an interview segment before his scheduled match against Storm in the opening round of a tournament for the World Television Championship. However, Aldis refused to compete and ordered Isaacs to compete in his place, who lost to Storm. The feud between Aldis and Morton intensified on the January 7 episode of Powerrr where Aldis proposed a six-man tag team match between Team Morton and Team Aldis where if Morton won then he would receive a title shot against Aldis. Aldis then named Wild Cards and the debuting Scott Steiner as the members for his team. The following week, Team Aldis lost to Team Morton (Robert Gibson, Eli Drake and Tim Storm), which earned Morton, a title shot against Aldis for the World Heavyweight Championship on the January 21 episode of Powerrr, which Aldis retained. Steiner would quietly leave Aldis' alliance and leave NWA shortly after.

At the Hard Times pay-per-view on January 24, Wild Cards participated in a three-way match for the World Tag Team Championship against Rock 'n' Roll Express and the team of Eli Drake and James Storm, which Drake and Storm won while Aldis retained the World Heavyweight Championship against Villain Enterprises member Flip Gordon. Also at the event, a feud began between Strictly Business and Villain Enterprises based on Gordon's teammate Marty Scurll demanding a title shot against Aldis and Aldis agreeing to give him a title shot if Scurll would leave the building. On the January 28 episode of Powerrr, Aldis proposed to Scurll that he would give him a title shot if Scurll would refund every fan's money upon losing. At Ring of Honor's Free Enterprise event, Scurll agreed to Aldis' stipulation to pay him $500,000 upon losing the match, setting up their title match at a future date. On the February 11 episode of Powerrr, Latimer defeated Strictly Business rival Tim Storm while Aldis and Isaacs defeated Rock 'n' Roll Express. Aldis and Scurll's feud would lead to the beginning of a feud between Strictly Business and Villain Enterprises. The World Heavyweight Championship match was scheduled between Aldis and Scurll at Crockett Cup. Wild Cards were also announced as participants in the Crockett Cup tournament. However, the event was cancelled due to the COVID-19 pandemic and all subsequent tapings for Powerrr were suspended by NWA. Aldis and Latimer defeated Scurll and Brody King in a tag team match which aired on the special Super Powerrr episode on May 12. The episode also featured Kamille's in-ring debut against Madi Maxx in a winning effort.

Royce Isaacs requested his release during the hiatus and he was granted his release by NWA in September. It also marked May Valentine's silent departure from the faction. NWA resumed holding events in early 2021. All members of Strictly Business participated at the Back For The Attack event on March 21; Latimer challenged Da Pope for the World Television Championship with the match ending in a ten-minute time limit draw, Kamille defeated Thunder Rosa to become the #1 contender for the World Women's Championship and Aldis retained the World Heavyweight Championship against Aron Stevens.

On the March 23 episode of Powerrr, the recently debuted Chris Adonis joined Aldis and Latimer as their third partner and the trio defeated Da Pope, Aron Stevens and JR Kratos in a six-man tag team match. Aldis did not officially acknowledge Adonis' inclusion into Strictly Business but the group celebrated with Adonis after he defeated Trevor Murdoch in a no disqualification, no count-out match for the National Championship on the March 30 episode of Powerrr. The following week, on Powerrr, Adonis was officially announced as a member of Strictly Business when he teamed with Latimer to defeat The End (Mike Parrow and Odinson). Strictly Business would begin feuding with Murdoch. On the April 27 episode of Powerrr, Adonis, Latimer and JR Kratos defeated Murdoch, Tim Storm and Aron Stevens in a six-man tag team match forcing Murdoch to be suspended without pay for thirty days.

On the May 12 episode of Powerrr, Strictly Business criticized the NWA management under Billy Corgan and Aldis protested on a 14-man battle royal being scheduled to determine his challenger. Aldis protested and cancelled the scheduled World Tag Team Championship title opportunity for Adonis and Latimer against Aron Stevens and JR Kratos. The following week, on Powerrr, Corgan punished Strictly Business by revoking Adonis and Latimer's tag title shot and docking Aldis' one month salary and donating its salary. He also warned them to appear on the next week's episode or they would be fired and Adonis and Aldis would be stripped of their respective titles. Kamille was exempt from punishment as she continued to appear. The following week, on Powerrr, Strictly Business showed up with Adonis and Latimer entered into the battle royal for a future title shot at Aldis' title. Adonis vacated the National Championship in order to participate in the battle royal as champions could not participate in the match. Murdoch won and Aldis confronted his team for failing to win. At When Our Shadows Fall, Adonis and Latimer competed against Aron Stevens and Kratos and Crimson and Jax Dane in a three-way match for the World Tag Team Championship but failed to win, Kamille defeated Serena Deeb to win the World Women's Championship and Aldis retained the World Heavyweight Championship against Murdoch via disqualification.

On the June 22 episode of Powerrr, Adonis and Latimer were forced to compete against each other and Parrow in a three-way match with the winner facing JTG for the vacant National Championship. Adonis won the match and subsequently defeated JTG to win his second National Championship on the July 6 episode of Powerrr.

At EmPowerrr, Kamille retained the World Women's Championship against Leyla Hirsch. The following night, at NWA 73, Latimer competed against Tim Storm and Crimson in a Brawl in the Lou match in a losing effort, Adonis retained the National Championship against James Storm, Kamille retained the World Women's Championship against Chelsea Green and Aldis lost the World Heavyweight Championship to Murdoch in a title vs. career match.

=== Adonis and Latimer's alliance (2021–2023) ===
Aldis began teasing signs of a transition into a fan favorite by appreciating Murdoch and showing respect to him. On the September 28 episode of Powerrr, Tim Storm confronted Strictly Business over their recent actions which led to Adonis, Latimer and Kamille surrounding him in the ring to attack him until Aldis made the save for Storm. This led to Aldis teaming with Storm the following week to take on Adonis and Latimer the following week on Powerrr, which Aldis and Storm won. Latimer and Adonis turned on Aldis by attacking him and Storm after the match, thus kicking Aldis out of the group. Latimer later explained his betrayal of Aldis was due to Aldis always holding him back and using him to progress further in his career. Storm confronted Latimer and challenged him to a match on the October 19 episode of Powerrr Surge, which Latimer won. At By Any Means Necessary airing on the November 9 episode of Powerrr, Strictly Business lost to Aldis and Murdoch in a tag team match. Adonis lost to Aldis on the November 23 episode of Powerrr. At Hard Times 2, Adonis retained the National Championship against Judais, Aldis defeated Latimer in a grudge match and Kamille retained the World Women's Championship against Melina.

On the January 11, 2022 episode of Powerrr, Strictly Business competed in a three-way match against Trevor Murdoch and Tim Storm and the team of Matt Cardona and Mike Knox, which Cardona and Knox won. Strictly Business resumed their feud with Aldis as they lost to the reunited British Invasion (Nick Aldis and Doug Williams) on the January 29 episode of NWA USA. At PowerrrTrip, Adonis lost the National Championship to Anthony Mayweather, Kamille retained the World Women's Championship against Taryn Terrell and Latimer lost to Aldis in an "I Quit" match.

=== Disbandment ===
During Adonis and Latimer's match against Mike Knox and Trevor Murdoch on the August 22 2023 episode of Powerrr, Adonis turned on Latimer and attacked him, thus giving Knox and Murdoch the victory. After the match, Adonis challenged Latimer for his NWA World Television Championship at NWA 75.

== Championships and accomplishments ==
- National Wrestling Alliance
  - NWA National Championship (2 times) – Adonis
  - NWA World Heavyweight Championship (1 time) – Aldis
  - NWA World Tag Team Championship (1 time) – Latimer and Isaacs
  - NWA World Women's Championship (1 time) – Kamille
