= List of National Wrestling Alliance pay-per-view events =

Listing of pay-per-view events from the NWA

This is a list of all professional wrestling pay-per-view (PPV) events promoted by the National Wrestling Alliance (NWA) while under the ownership of Billy Corgan's Lightning One. To date all shows have been broadcast on FITE TV.

== Pay-per-view events ==
=== Past events ===
==== 2018 ====
| Date | Event | Venue | Location | Main event |
|---|---|---|---|---|
| August 8 | Summer Supercard | Mattamy Athletic Centre | Toronto, Ontario, Canada | The Briscoes (Jay Briscoe and Mark Briscoe) (c) vs. Guerrillas of Destiny (Tama Tonga and Tanga Loa) in a Ladder War VIII match for the ROH World Tag Team Championship |
| October 21 | NWA 70th Anniversary Show | Tennessee State Fairgrounds Arena | Nashville, Tennessee | Cody (c) vs. Nick Aldis in a Two-Out-Of-Three Falls match for the NWA Worlds Heavyweight Championship |
(c) – refers to the champion(s) heading into the match

==== 2019 ====
| Date | Event | Venue | Location | Main event |
|---|---|---|---|---|
| January 5 | New Years Clash | Wilma Rudolph Event Center | Clarksville, Tennessee | Nick Aldis (c) vs. James Storm for the NWA Worlds Heavyweight Championship |
| April 27 | Crockett Cup | Cabarrus Arena | Concord, North Carolina | Nick Aldis (c) vs. Marty Scurll for the NWA Worlds Heavyweight Championship |
| December 14 | Into the Fire | GPB Studios | Atlanta, Georgia | Nick Aldis (c) vs. James Storm in a Two-Out-Of-Three Falls match for the NWA Worlds Heavyweight Championship |
(c) – refers to the champion(s) heading into the match

==== 2020 ====
| Date | Event | Venue | Location | Main event |
|---|---|---|---|---|
| January 24 | Hard Times | GPB Studios | Atlanta, Georgia | Ricky Starks vs. Trevor Murdoch to determine the new NWA World Television Championship |
(c) – refers to the champion(s) heading into the match

==== 2021 ====
| Date | Event | Venue | Location | Main event |
|---|---|---|---|---|
| March 21 | Back For The Attack | GPB Studios | Atlanta, Georgia | Nick Aldis (c) vs. Aron Stevens for the NWA Worlds Heavyweight Championship |
| June 6 | When Our Shadows Fall | GPB Studios | Atlanta, Georgia | Nick Aldis (c) vs. Trevor Murdoch for the NWA Worlds Heavyweight Championship |
| August 28 | EmPowerrr | Chase's Khorassan Ballroom | St. Louis, Missouri | Bianca Carelli vs. Chelsea Green vs. Debbie Malenko vs. Lady Frost vs. Jamie Senegal vs. Jennacide vs. Kiera Hogan vs. Masha Slamovich vs. Tootie Lynn vs. Thunder Kitty in the NWA Women's Invitational Cup Gauntlet |
| August 29 | NWA 73rd Anniversary Show | Chase's Khorassan Ballroom | St. Louis, Missouri | Nick Aldis (c) vs. Trevor Murdoch (Career) in a Title vs. Career match for the NWA Worlds Heavyweight Championship |
| December 4 | Hard Times 2 | GPB Studios | Atlanta, Georgia | Trevor Murdoch (c) vs. Mike Knox for the NWA Worlds Heavyweight Championship |
(c) – refers to the champion(s) heading into the match

==== 2022 ====
| Date | Event | Venue | Location | Main event |
|---|---|---|---|---|
| March 19 | Crockett Cup | Nashville Fairgrounds | Nashville, Tennessee | The Commonwealth Connection (Doug Williams and Harry Smith) vs. Gold Rushhh (Jordan Clearwater and Marshe Rockett) in a Crockett Cup quarterfinals tag team match |
| March 20 | Crockett Cup | Nashville Fairgrounds | Nashville, Tennessee | Matt Cardona (c) vs. Nick Aldis for the NWA Worlds Heavyweight Championship with Jeff Jarrett as special guest referee |
| June 11 | Alwayz Ready | Knoxville Convention Center | Knoxville, Tennessee | Trevor Murdoch vs. Nick Aldis vs. Thom Latimer vs. Samuel Shaw in a four-way match for the vacant NWA Worlds Heavyweight Championship |
| August 27 | NWA 74th Anniversary Show | Chase's Khorassan Ballroom | St. Louis, Missouri | Kamille (c) vs. Taya Valkyrie for the NWA World Women's Championship |
| August 28 | NWA 74th Anniversary Show | Chase's Khorassan Ballroom | St. Louis, Missouri | Trevor Murdoch (c) vs. Tyrus for the NWA Worlds Heavyweight Championship |
| November 12 | Hard Times 3 | Frederick J. Sigur Civic Center | Chalmette, Louisiana | Trevor Murdoch (c) vs. Matt Cardona vs. Tyrus in a three-way match for the NWA Worlds Heavyweight Championship |
(c) – refers to the champion(s) heading into the match

==== 2023 ====
| Date | Event | Venue | Location | Main event |
|---|---|---|---|---|
| February 11 | Nuff Said | Egypt Shrine Center | Tampa, Florida | Tyrus (c) vs. Matt Cardona for the NWA Worlds Heavyweight Championship |
| April 7 | NWA 312 | StudioONE | Highland Park, Illinois | Tyrus (c) vs. Chris Adonis for the NWA Worlds Heavyweight Championship |
| June 3 | Crockett Cup | Winston-Salem Fairgrounds Annex | Winston-Salem, North Carolina | La Rebelión (Bestia 666 and Mecha Wolf) vs. Flippin' Psychos (Flip Gordon and Fodder) in a Crockett Cup second round tag team match |
| June 4 | Crockett Cup | Winston-Salem Fairgrounds Annex | Winston-Salem, North Carolina | Knox and Murdoch vs. Blunt Force Trauma (Carnage and Damage) in the Crockett Cup Tag Team Tournament Final |
| August 26 | NWA 75th Anniversary Show | Chase's Khorassan Ballroom | St. Louis, Missouri | Kamille (c) vs. Natalia Markova in a No Limits match for the NWA World Women's Championship |
| August 27 | NWA 75th Anniversary Show | Chase's Khorassan Ballroom | St. Louis, Missouri | Tyrus (c) vs. EC3 in a Bullrope match for the NWA Worlds Heavyweight Championship |
| October 28 | Samhain | TempleLive at Cleveland Masonic | Cleveland, Ohio | EC3 (c) vs. Thom Latimer in a No Limits match for the NWA Worlds Heavyweight Championship |
(c) – refers to the champion(s) heading into the match

== NWA Special Supercards ==
For the NWA Pop-Up Events, NWA PowerrrTrip Events and NWA Signature Live Events see: NWA Special Supercards
