= NWA Back for the Attack =

2021 National Wrestling Alliance pay-per-view event

- Promotional poster featuring Nick Aldis, J. R. Kratos, Thunder Rosa, Tyrus, and Aron Stevens
- Promotion: National Wrestling Alliance
- Date: March 21, 2021
- City: Atlanta, Georgia
- Venue: GPB Studios
- Attendance: 0 (behind closed doors) (Note: The event was held without a paying audience due to the COVID-19 pandemic in the United States.)

Pay-per-view chronology
← Previous; Hard Times	Next → When Our Shadows Fall

Back for the Attack was a professional wrestling pay-per-view (PPV) event promoted by the National Wrestling Alliance (NWA). The event took place on March 21, 2021, in Atlanta, Georgia, at GPB Studios, and aired exclusively on FITE TV. This was the first live event produced by the NWA since Hard Times on January 24, 2020, as the promotion halted operations due to the COVID-19 pandemic. The event was in memory of NWA wrestler Joseph "Jocephus" Hudson (who also portrayed The Question Mark), who died February 24, 2021.

Six matches were contested at the event. In the main event, Nick Aldis defeated Aron Stevens to retain the NWA Worlds Heavyweight Championship. In other prominent matches, Trevor Murdoch defeated Chris Adonis to retain the NWA National Championship, Kamille defeated Thunder Rosa to become the number one contender to the NWA World Women's Championship, and Da Pope fought Thom Latimer to a time limit draw for the NWA World Television Championship.

== Production ==
=== Storylines ===
On the NWA's official Twitter account and FITE TV description, the promotion has already scheduled appearances from NWA talent and wrestlers from the independent scene. Names include Tim Storm, Thunder Rosa, NWA World Television Champion Elijah Burke, NWA National Champion Trevor Murdoch, Tyrus, and Chris Adonis.

The main event of the PPV will see Aron Stevens - one half of the NWA World Tag Team Champions with J. R. Kratos, former NWA National Champion, and tag team partner of Hudson - challenging Nick Aldis for the NWA Worlds Heavyweight Championship. Also on the card is a four-way match between Jordan Clearwater, Slice Boogie, Crimson, and former NWA World Heavyweight Champion Jax Dane.

On March 15, a match between Thunder Rosa and Kamille was scheduled for the event, with the winner receiving a shot at Serena Deeb's NWA World Women's Championship. Rosa and Kamille have had previous encounters while the former was champion, as after Rosa's title defense against Melina on the January 25 episode of NWA Powerrr, Kamille would come out and spear former champion Allysin Kay; making her title aspirations clear. Taryn Terrell, who recently came out of retirement after three years, made her debut on commentary for the match and had expressed her desire to go after the title.

The event also saw the NWA change the time limit for the NWA World Television Championship matches from six minutes and five seconds to ten minutes for pay-per-view title matches.

== Event ==
Other on-screen personnel
Commentators	Joe Galli
Commentators	Tim Storm
Commentators	Austin Idol (Main event)
Commentators	Taryn Terrell (Kamille vs. Thunder Rosa)
Ring announcer	Kyle Davis
Referees	Jarrod Fritz
Referees	Robert King
Referees	Scott Wheeler
Interviewers	Kyle Davis
Interviewers	May Valentine

The event began with a video package of Aron Stevens explaining that he lost his passion for professional wrestling and was done with the industry, but received a call from the NWA, how Joseph Hudson helped reignite that passion again and remind him of his love for the fans after taking them for granted. Joe Galli and Tim Storm ran down the show's card, and Kyle Davis stood at the podium to interview NWA Worlds Heavyweight Champion Nick Aldis. Aldis said that things were now different since the last time he appeared, how the NWA suffered from a few setbacks, but they were just the setup for the comeback. He thanked the fans for joining and sticking with them, put over the wrestlers in the back who are prepared to put on the best show possible, not just for the fans, but for Hudson as well. Aldis stated that he welcomed them to steal the show, and called out Stevens to bring out the best version of himself to beat him for the title.

=== Preliminary matches ===
The opening match of the event was a four-way bout involving Crimson, Jax Dane, Jordan Clearwater, and Slice Boogie. A brawl ensues that leaves Crimson and Dane left in the ring, and they throw punches before taking themselves out with a double crossbody. Boogie enters the ring to deliver a piledriver on Crimson, but he counters it into an exploder suplex. Clearwater lands a neckbreaker on Crimson, sends Boogie into Dane in the corner, and hits a splash on both men. Boogie throws Clearwater into the opposite corner, gets launched over the top rope, but gets back in the ring by delivering a rope-springboard German suplex. Boogie attempts to use Clearwater as a step-stool against Dane, but gets caught and put into a Boston crab. Clearwater punches Dane, who brushes it off and removes the hold, but gets knocked out with an enzuigiri. Crimson lands a back suplex on Clearwater, catches him going for a flying crossbody, and lands a Death Valley Driver but Boogie and Dane break up the pin. Crimson and Dane work together to take out Boogie, resulting in Dane hitting him with a clothesline. They attempt to double team on Clearwater, but Boogie brings Crimson outside the ring, allowing Clearwater to hit the "Midas Touch" on Dane. Boogie hits Clearwater with a missile dropkick and lands the "Dead-Ass Driver" to get the pin.

Next, J. R. Kratos took on Tyrus, making his NWA debut. Tyrus goes over to Kyle Davis and explains how he is mad that he didn't get an interview before his match and is tired of the disrespect. The two push each other away after a lockup, Tyrus showing frustration as he nor Kratos can gain the advantage. Kratos lands a shoulder tackle that sends Tyrus to the ropes, and delivers a flying forearm smash and a discus clothesline in the corner. Kratos attempts to lift Tyrus but is prevented by his injured elbow, allowing Tyrus to target it with a chicken wing while using the ropes, and deliver overhand strikes on Kratos' back. Kratos lands a few punches but Tyrus hits a downward chop, and maintains control by delivering a few shoulder blocks. Tyrus hits a leg drop on Kratos that gives him a two count, applies a nerve hold and then a body slam, but misses the Vader Bomb. Kratos fights back with a flurry of strikes and lands a flying clothesline on Tyrus, but only gets two. Tyrus goes after the elbow again, sends Kratos shoulder first into the middle turnbuckle, sandwiches him in the corner, and lands a running elbow drop for the victory.

The third match saw Da Pope defend the NWA World Television Championship against Thom Latimer. Latimer shows off his power by shoving Pope into the corner. The two exchange wrist holds as Pope applies a side headlock. Latimer pushes off Pope to the ropes and hits two shoulder blocks. Pope uses his speed to gain the advantage, lands a crossbody for a cover but Latimer kicks out, who then hits a clothesline on Pope. Latimer lays some shots on Pope before sending him to the corner. Pope regains control with an elbow and a couple of strikes, getting a sunset flip for two, but Latimer gets up and hits an elbow for another two. Latimer applies a chinlock on Pope, followed by a scoop slam for two, and heads up to the turnbuckle to hit two axe handles on Pope. A third one is avoided as Pope counters it into a German suplex in the corner. Pope continues the assault with a flurry of strikes, followed by a reverse atomic drop and a DDT for two. Latimer gets some shots on Pope, but gets taken out with an STO, kicking out at two. Latimer sends Pope into the corner, hits a shoulder block and follows up with a spinebuster. Latimer heads to the top rope, but Pope catches him and lands a superplex. Pope gets a boot on Latimer and hits three flying elbow drops. Pope goes for "Da Pope Express" but Latimer avoids it as Pope slips on the middle rope, leaving him open for a powerbomb. Pope kicks out of Latimer's cover at two, and hits a Destroyer for another near fall. The two start trading strikes as time runs out. Davis announced that the match has come to a time limit draw, with Pope retaining his TV title. Pope begrudgingly accepts the result but Latimer leaves the ring in disgust.

The fourth match involved Kamille against Thunder Rosa, where the winner will be the number one contender to Serena Deeb's NWA World Women's Championship. Taryn Terrell joined Galli and Storm on commentary. Kamille delivers a gutwrench suplex on Rosa and trash talks to commentary, gets hit by two clotheslines, a couple of forearm strikes and a kick from Rosa, but catches a second kick and knocks her down. Kamille lands some clubbing blows to Rosa's chest and some foot stomps to her midsection, but her trash talking allows Rosa to apply a cross armbreaker that transitions into a triangle choke, which Kamille escapes after hitting a Buckle Bomb in the corner. Kamille charges towards Rosa, but misses her and goes shoulder first into the ring post and outside the ring. Rosa lands a basement dropkick on Kamille, but gets caught attempting a crossbody, and then slammed on the concrete. Rosa regains control from Kamille by delivering kicks to her back and applying a bow and arrow with the ring post. Back in the ring, Rosa covers Kamille for a two count, lands more kicks and chops, but gets taken out with another gutwrench suplex. Rosa catches Kamille to apply a single leg Boston crab into an STF, stretches her back before stomping her down, but only get a two count. Kamille hits three haymakers and a clothesline on Rosa, who attempts to fight back with body shots and knee strikes, but Kamille lands an elbow and does a cocky cover for two. Rosa catches Kamille's leg and applies another bow and arrow stretch, gets taken down with a snapmare and a kick to her back, but retaliates with double knees and a dropkick to Kamille's back, but only gets two. Rosa traps both of Kamille's arms into a submission, gets picked up and slammed on the top turnbuckle, but fights back with a missile dropkick and a backstabber for a near fall. Rosa heads to the top rope to go for the diving stomp, but misses and gets hit with a spear. Kamille lands a second spear on Rosa and gets the win to become number one contender to the NWA World Women's Championship.

The penultimate match saw Trevor Murdoch defend the NWA National Championship against Chris Adonis. Murdoch catches Adonis with a side headlock to gain the advantage and grounds him with a headlock takeover. Adonis gets the headscissors on Murdoch, who manages to escape and applies the headlock takeover. The two come to a stand still after a shoulder block, with Murdoch inviting Adonis to his own, only to catch him with a drop toehold and back to the side headlock. Adonis escapes and goes for a "Master Lock" attempt, but Murdoch grabs the ropes. Adonis pushes Murdoch into the corner, goes for a punch but gets caught in another side headlock, followed by a side Russian legsweep. Murdoch goes up top to hit the diving bulldog, but Adonis avoids it and lands three elbow drops, before delivering a flurry of punches. Murdoch lands some shots on Adonis who delivers an eye poke followed by a back rake, hits a snapmare into a chinlock and stretches out Murdoch before applying a sleeper hold. Murdoch escapes the hold, delivers a back elbow and three clotheslines, and goes up top to hit a flying crossbody for a two count. Adonis catches Murdoch with the "Master Lock", but Murdoch slides underneath to roll up Adonis for the win and retains his title. After the match, Murdoch offers Adonis a handshake, which he accepts, but proceeds to attack Murdoch and plant him with a full nelson slam. Adonis applies the "Master Lock" on Murdoch and puts the NWA National Championship on his body as he leaves the ring.

Before the main event, Austin Idol joined Galli and Storm on commentary, and Davis led a ten bell salute in honor of Ron Reed, Jim Crockett Jr. and Joseph Hudson.

=== Main event ===
In the main event, Nick Aldis defended the NWA Worlds Heavyweight Championship against Aron Stevens. After some back-and-forth chain wrestling, Aldis grounds Stevens with two shoulder tackles for consecutive one counts. Stevens gets some one counts of his own after a roll up and a shoulder tackle on Aldis. Stevens takes out Aldis with a clothesline, knee strikes, a Russian legsweep and a couple of elbow drops for a two count. Stevens whips Aldis into the corner, lays some stomps on him, and delivers a belly-to-belly suplex for another two count. Aldis avoids a springboard moonsault and sends Stevens to the outside, ramming him into the ring apron and the steel post. Back in the ring, Stevens fights back with some headbutts, but Aldis regains control with a clothesline, but only gets a two. Aldis applies a side headlock on Stevens, who breaks out of the hold and hits an inverted atomic drop and a superkick. Aldis narrowly avoids a discus clothesline, but Stevens is able to get some shots in the corner, and both of them clothesline each other to the ground. The two rise to their feet and trade punches with each other, with Aldis countering a superkick into a "King's Lynn Cloverleaf" attempt, but Stevens hits a leg sweep and a DDT for a two count. Aldis goes for a figure-four leglock but Stevens rolls him up for another two count, and applies Austin Idol's "Las Vegas Leg Lock", with Aldis reversing the hold and forcing Stevens to grab the bottom rope. Aldis hits Stevens with a Michinoku Driver for a two count, gets caught on the top rope, and Stevens hits a superplex for another two count. Stevens lands some shoulder tackles on Aldis in the corner, sets him up top for another superplex, but Aldis knocks him down to hit an elbow drop for two. Stevens escapes a piledriver attempt and hits Aldis with a discus elbow, but only gets a two count. Stevens delivers a knee drop on Aldis, but gets caught jumping off the middle rope into the "King's Lynn Cloverleaf" in the center of the ring. Aldis manages to pull Stevens away from the ropes, but Stevens is able to grab them to break the hold. Outside the ring, Stevens sends Aldis shoulder first into the steel post, while also taking down the podium. Stevens gets back in the ring before the referee's ten count, goes for Aldis' shoulder and applies the crossface, but Aldis gets his foot on the bottom rope to break the hold. Aldis goes for a roll up but Stevens counters it back into the crossface in the center of the ring. Aldis grabs the bottom rope again to break the hold, avoids an arm breaker and reverses an inside cradle for the win to retain his title.

After the match, the two shake hands and are joined by Joseph Hudson's wife (holding The Question Mark's Mongrovian flag) and the rest of the NWA roster in the ring.

== Reception ==
Tommy Martinez of Slam Wrestling reviewed the event and gave it a 4.3 out of 5. He wrote: "Just a great PPV from top to bottom. If anything, this show is a celebration not only of Joseph Hudson's life, but the pure joy one can have in being in, and participating in, professional wrestling. It's shows like this that rekindle my enjoyment of the sport. The big standouts were not only the main event with Aldis/Stevens (and I truly hope that isn't the last we see Stevens get a shot at the top), but Rosa/Kamille damn near tore the house down." Jason Powell of Pro Wrestling Dot Net wrote: "Overall, it was a straight forward show with mostly in-ring action. It was awkward to dive back into a pay-per-view without any storyline build. The decision to have people making noise was a good one, as the atmosphere was so much better than empty venue shows. It was nice to see the NWA back, but the rollout of their return starting with a pay-per-view was awkward to say the least."

== Results ==
No.	Results	Stipulations	Times
1	Slice Boogie defeated Crimson, Jax Dane, and Jordan Clearwater by pinfall	Four-way match	5:41
2	Tyrus defeated J. R. Kratos by pinfall	Singles match	7:27
3	Da Pope (c) vs. Thom Latimer ended in a time limit draw	Singles match for the NWA World Television Championship	10:00
4	Kamille defeated Thunder Rosa by pinfall	Singles match to determine the #1 contender to the NWA World Women's Championship	14:04
5	Trevor Murdoch (c) defeated Chris Adonis by pinfall	Singles match for the NWA National Championship	8:38
6	Nick Aldis (c) defeated Aron Stevens by pinfall	Singles match for the NWA Worlds Heavyweight Championship	21:29
(c) / – the champion(s) heading into the match
