= GPB Studios =

Television production studio and corporate office located in Atlanta, Georgia

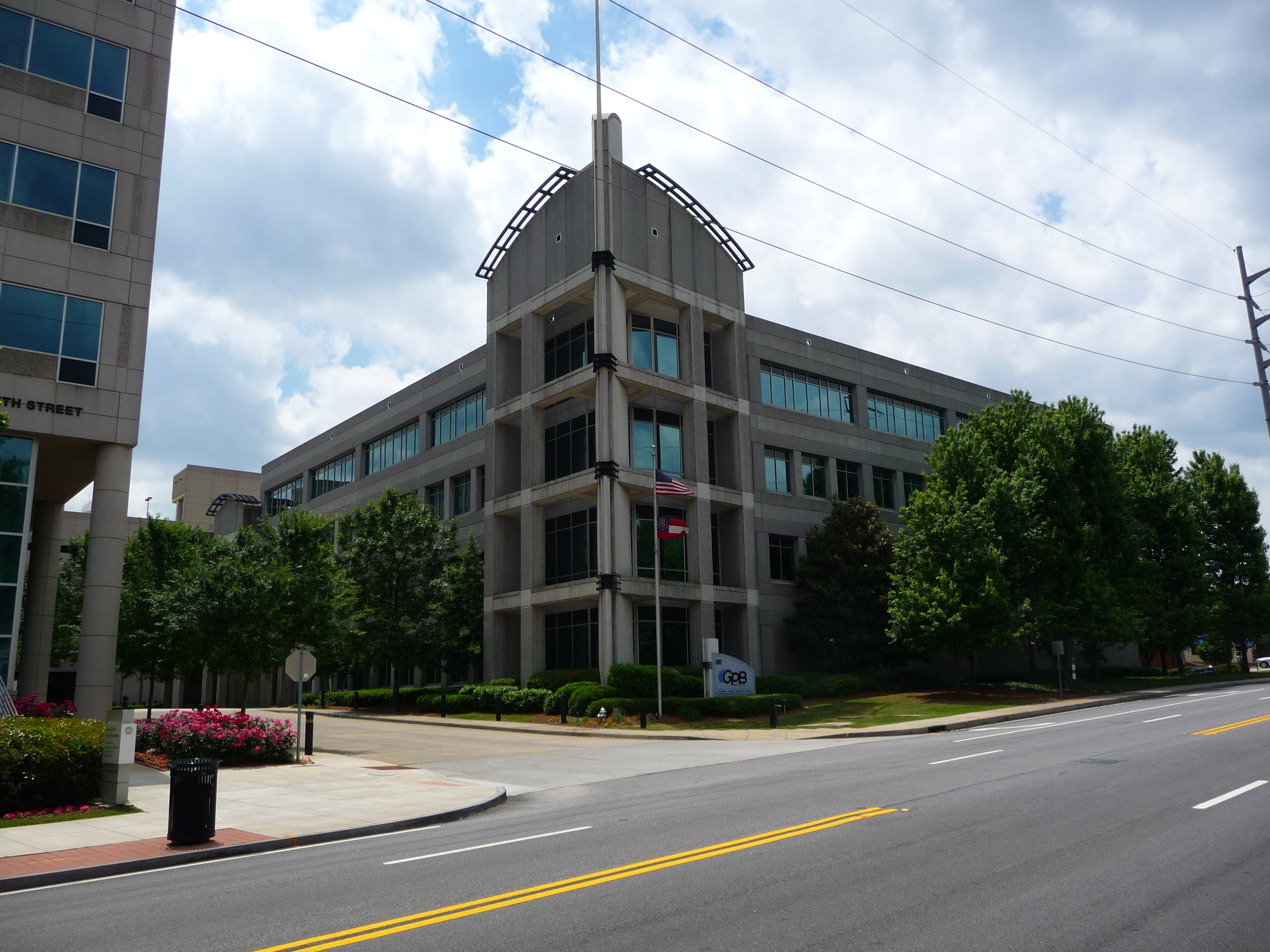

General information
- Type: Film and television production studio Corporate offices
- Location: 260 14th Street Northwest; Atlanta, Georgia; 30318
- Coordinates: 33.7861°N 84.3954°W
- Opening: 1997
- Owner: Georgia Public Telecommunications Commission

The GPB Studios is a television and radio production studio located in Atlanta, Georgia. The studio houses production broadcasting facilities for the Georgia Public Broadcasting radio and television network.

== History ==
=== 1990s ===
In 1997, following a rebranding of Georgia Public Television to Georgia Public Broadcasting, the network moved into its current studio which was controversially constructed using funds from the Georgia Lottery which was later cited as one of several unnecessary projects using lottery funds. Following financial mismanagement by the board of directors and GPB executive director Vernon Rogers led to their ousting by Georgia governor Roy Barnes and the appointment of state auditor Claude Vickers as the new executive director to revitalize the network which had accumulated a three-year deficit nearing $7 million.

=== 2010s–present ===
From 2010 to 2011, the first season of CBS Television Distribution's syndicated television program Swift Justice with Nancy Grace was filmed at the studio. In 2014, Orion Television used the studio facilities to film Lauren Lake's Paternity Court. In 2017, Orion filmed another syndicated court show titled Couples Court with the Cutlers at the studio.

In 2019, the National Wrestling Alliance, a professional wrestling promotion owned by Smashing Pumpkins frontman Billy Corgan, began using the studios for tapings of its weekly streaming television show NWA Powerrr on YouTube. The promotion also held the inaugural Into the Fire pay-per-view at the studio on December 14, 2019. From 2020 to 2022, the NWA held four more pay-per-view events at the studio beginning with Hard Times in 2020 which featured a tournament to decide the inaugural NWA World Television Champion and the Back for the Attack, Hard Times 2, and When Our Shadows Fall pay-per-views in 2021. In December 2021, the NWA began hosting tapings for its secondary streaming television program NWA USA at the studios.

Beginning in 2023, the studio filmed the Peach Jam TV program and its accompanying podcast on GPB's PBS and NPR stations which featured various interviews and live performances from local musicians.

In 2025, season 3 of the revival of the Fox-produced reality legal television program America's Most Wanted was filmed at the studio.
