= NWA When Our Shadows Fall =

2021 National Wrestling Alliance pay-per-view event

- Promotional poster
- Promotion: National Wrestling Alliance
- Date: June 6, 2021
- City: Atlanta, Georgia
- Venue: GPB Studios

Pay-per-view chronology
← Previous; Back For The Attack	Next → EmPowerrr

When Our Shadows Fall was a professional wrestling pay-per-view event promoted by the National Wrestling Alliance (NWA). It took place on June 6, 2021, in Atlanta, Georgia at GPB Studios, and aired exclusively on FITE TV.

Ten matches were contested at the event, including three on the pre-show. In the main event, Nick Aldis defeated Trevor Murdoch by disqualification to retain the NWA Worlds Heavyweight Championship. In other prominent matches, Kamille defeated Serena Deeb to win the NWA World Women's Championship, and Aron Stevens and J. R. Kratos defeated The War Kings (Jax Dane and Crimson) and Strictly Business (Thom Latimer and Chris Adonis) to retain the NWA World Tag Team Championship.

== Production ==
=== Background ===
Other on-screen personnel
Role:	Name:
Commentators	Joe Galli
Commentators	Stu Bennett

On Friday, April 23 on the NWA and FITE TV's social media platforms, it was announced that the promotion would return to pay-per-view with When Our Shadows Fall on June 6, 2021

=== Storylines ===
The event will feature professional wrestling matches that involved different wrestlers from pre-existing scripted feuds and storylines. Wrestlers portray heroes, villains, or less distinguishable characters in scripted events that build tension and culminate in a wrestling match or series of matches. The fourth season of NWA's weekly flagship program, Power, featured storylines leading up to the pay-per-view.

At Back for the Attack, Trevor Murdoch defeated Chris Adonis to retain the NWA National Championship, before being assaulted by Adonis thereafter. On the same night, Nick Aldis successfully defended the NWA Worlds Heavyweight Championship against Aron Stevens. The following Tuesday on the return episode of NWA Power, Adonis would align himself with Aldis and his stable Strictly Business (also including Thom Latimer and Kamille). They, along with Latimer, would later defeat NWA World Tag Team Champions Stevens and J. R. Kratos, and NWA World Television Champion Da Pope in the main event. The next week, Murdoch would set his sights on Aldis and the World Heavyweight Championship when he interrupted Aldis in an interview, before Adonis again jumped the National Champion. This prompted Murdoch to give Adonis a rematch, this time a No Disqualification match. Adonis would win the match and title by taking advantage of the champion's injured neck. On the debut of the NWA's new recap show, Powerrr Surge, on April 13, a battle royal featuring non-champions was announced, with the winner going on to challenge Aldis for the NWA Worlds Heavyweight Championship at When Our Shadows Fall. On the April 20 episode, dubbed Super Power, Aldis' exhibition match against Jordan Clearwater ended in a no contest after the referee went to break up a beatdown of Murdoch by Strictly Business, in an effort to neutralize the threat of Murdoch to Aldis' reign. The following week, Adonis, Latimer, and Kratos would defeat Murdoch, Stevens, and Tim Storm after accidental interference from Sal Rinauro; with pre-match stipulations stating that since Murdoch's team lost, he would be suspended from the NWA for 30 days without pay (in contrast, if they had won, Murdoch would get a National Title rematch with Adonis). The #1 contender's battle royal took place on May 25, where Murdoch (returning despite only having left for 28 days instead of the stipulated 30) last eliminated Adonis (who relinquished the National Championship to compete) to win the match and the opportunity at the pay-per-view.

Also at Back For the Attack, Kamille defeated Thunder Rosa in a #1 contender's match, earning her an opportunity at Serena Deeb's NWA World Women's Championship. On the following Power, Rosa expressed her frustrations about losing the match. Melina, Rosa's former running mate, returned to the promotion and once again offered Rosa her services, which she declined. From there, Rosa and Kamille would continuously get in each other's business, with Kamille spearing both Rosa and Melina on separate episodes of Power. On April 26, Kamille and Rosa held a summit to discuss their issues. Rosa being backed up by Melina, and Kamille with Taryn Terrell, who came out of her 2017 retirement to provide commentary for Rosa and Kamille's previous encounter. After negotiations fell through, another summit was held on May 11. There, Kamille and Rosa set up another match with a 20-minute time limit and higher stakes: If Rosa won, she gets Kamille's title shot. If Kamille won, Rosa must only work for the NWA. The match took place on May 25. It was back and forth, with Kamille using her strength and power, whereas Rosa looked to keep her opponent grounded. Even with outside interference from Melina and Terrell, the match went to a time limit draw. On June 1, it was announced that Kamille would get her shot at Serena Deeb's title at When Our Shadow's Fall. Also at the event, Melina and Thunder Rosa will wrestle Terrell and Kylie Rae (returning to wrestling after announcing a sabbatical the previous November) in a tag team match.

On the May 4 episode of PowerrrSurge, Nick Aldis announced that his Strictly Business teammates Chris Adonis and Thom Latimer were the #1 contender's to the NWA World Tag Team Championship. They were scheduled to face champions Aron Stevens and JR Kratos for the titles on the May 11 episode of Power, but after hearing that the #1 contender's battle royal will not feature any NWA champions, Aldis had the match cancelled. Angered by this and the various other actions of Strictly Business, NWA president William Patrick Corgan stripped Adonis and Latimer of their contendership, and a match to determine new ones was made for the night. There, The War Kings (Jax Dane and Crimson) defeated The End (Odinson and Parrow) and faced Stevens and Kratos the following week. Unfortunately, they lost after a hooded and masked assailant sucker punched Crimson, costing the War Kings the win. On June 1, it was announced that Strictly Business will get their shot back, when they and The War Kings battle Stevens and Kratos for the titles in a three-way tag team match.

On the April 27 edition of Power, NWA World Television Championship Da Pope went to a time limit draw with Tyrus. Two weeks later, Tyrus' manager Austin Idol would congratulate Pope on another successful defense, by then notching his third in the Lucky Seven Rule (which stipulates that if the television champion made seven successful title defenses, they would earn a world title shot). However, Tyrus and Idol would remark that Pope never technically beat Tyrus, and that the two would meet in the ring for the title somewhere down the line. On June 1, a non-title grudge match was signed between Pope and Tyrus, where there must be a definitive winner.

== Results ==
No.	Results	Stipulations	Times
1^{P}	Colby Corino defeated Captain Yuma and PJ Hawx	Three-way match	3:25
2^{P}	Jennacide defeated Skye Blue	Singles match	3:44
3^{P}	Luke Hawx defeated Jeremiah Plunkett	Singles match to determine the #1 Contender to the NWA World Television Championship	7:40
4	La Rebelión (Mecha Wolf and Bestia 666) defeated The End (Odinson and Parrow), Slice Boogie and Marshe Rockett, and Sal Rinauro and Sam Rudo	Four-way tag team match	8:45
5	Tyrus (with Austin Idol) defeated The Pope	Grudge match There must be a winner.	10:25
6	Taryn Terrell and Kylie Rae defeated Thunder Rosa and Melina	Tag team match	8:55
7	JTG defeated Fred Rosser	Singles match	9:30
8	Aron Stevens and J. R. Kratos (c) defeated The War Kings (Jax Dane and Crimson) and Strictly Business (Thom Latimer and Chris Adonis)	Three-way tag team match for the NWA World Tag Team Championship	14:15
9	Kamille defeated Serena Deeb (c)	Singles match for the NWA World Women's Championship	14:20
10	Nick Aldis (c) defeated Trevor Murdoch by disqualification	Singles match for the NWA Worlds Heavyweight Championship	12:55
(c) / – the champion(s) heading into the match; P / – the match was broadcast on the pre-show
