= Kamille (wrestler) =

American wrestler (born 1992)

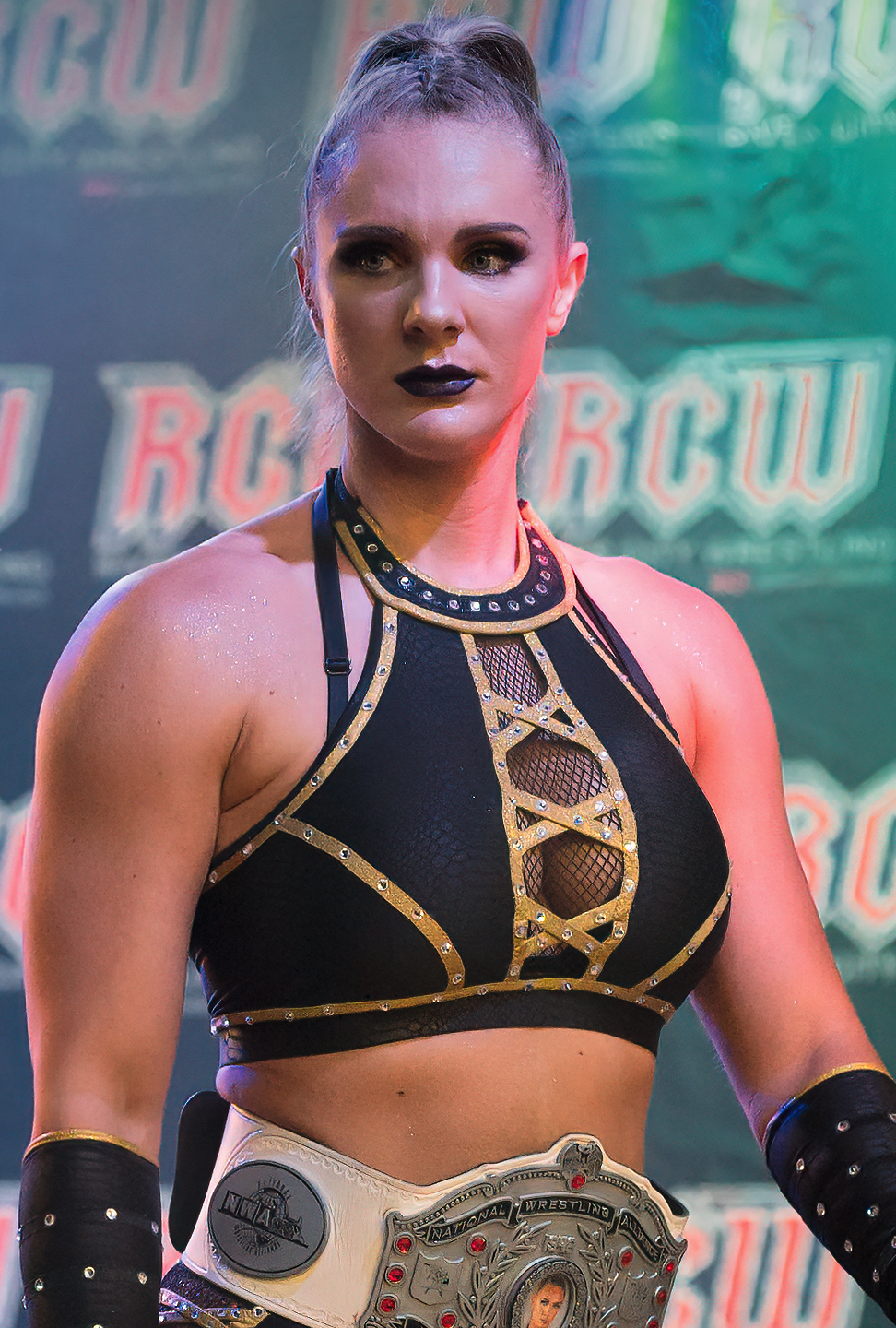
- Kamille in July 2021 as NWA World Women's Champion

Personal information
- Born: Kailey Dawn Farmer; July 2, 1993 (age 33) Durham, North Carolina, U.S.
- Education: Campbell University
- Spouse: Thom Latimer (m. 2022)

Professional wrestling career
- Ring name(s): Kailey Dawn; Kamilla Kaine; Kamille; Kamille Brickhouse
- Billed height: 5 ft 11.5 in (182 cm)
- Billed from: Durham, North Carolina, U.S.
- Trained by: Team 3D Academy
- Debut: May 19, 2017

Kailey Dawn Latimer (née Farmer; born July 2, 1993), better known by her ring name Kamille, is an American professional wrestler and former softball player, arena football player, and bodybuilder. As of February 2024, she is signed to All Elite Wrestling (AEW). She is best known for her time with the National Wrestling Alliance (NWA) from 2018 to 2024, where she is a former one-time NWA World Women's Champion. She also performed in Lucha Libre AAA Worldwide from 2022 to 2023.

== Early life ==
Latimer was born Kailey Dawn Farmer in Durham, North Carolina, on October 24, 1992. She attended Campbell University, where she played Division I softball for the Campbell Lady Camels and was a member of the Atlanta Steam in the Legends Football League.

== Professional wrestling career ==
=== Early career (2017–2018) ===
Latimer trained at the Team 3D Academy. Under the ring name Kamilla Kaine, she captured her first title in her rookie year while at Platinum Pro Wrestling (PPW), winning a seven-women Battle Royal match to become the new Diamonds Division Starlight Champion on May 19, 2017. She held the title until the following year at St. Patrick's Day Slamboree where she lost a three-way match against Dynamite DiDi and Amber Nova. She went on to work in several Florida-based promotions including REAL Pro Wrestling where on August 1, 2017, at the 2 Year Anniversary show, Kaine competed against Roxy Rouge in an unsuccessful attempt to become the new RPW Women's Champion. Kaine also wrestled in Shine, Atlanta Wrestling Entertainment and American Combat Wrestling among others during the first three years of her career.

=== National Wrestling Alliance (2018–2024) ===
Kamilla Kaine made her National Wrestling Alliance (NWA) debut as Nick Aldis' insurance policy at the NWA 70th Anniversary Show on October 21, 2018, to thwart Brandi Rhodes' interference on behalf of Cody. She would maintain her presence on the NWA television by beginning to appear regularly on the first episode of Powerrr with the tweaked ring name Kamille to accompany Aldis on a regular basis. She presented a silent powerhouse persona to the Powerrr audience and quickly became a part of Aldis' new stable Strictly Business, which also consisted of her fiancée Thom Latimer. Kamille's first match in NWA took place on the May 12, 2020, episode of Powerrr, where she defeated Madi Maxx. On March 21, 2021, at Back For The Attack, Kamille defeated Thunder Rosa to become the number one contender for the NWA World Women's Championship. She retained her status against Rosa in a rematch on the May 25 episode of Powerrr that ended in a time-limit draw. On June 6 at When Our Shadows Fall, Kamille defeated Serena Deeb to become the new NWA World Women's Champion.

Kamille made her first appearance at All Elite Wrestling (AEW) during the July 28, 2021, episode of Dynamite, where she watched The Bunny and Leyla Hirsch competing against each other to determine who she'd face for her title at EmPowerrr, which was won by Hirsch. On August 28, at EmPowerrr, Kamille successfully retained the title over Hirsch. On the 73rd Anniversary show of NWA, the day after EmPowerrr, she retained her title against the winner of the NWA Women's Invitational Cup Gauntlet, Chelsea Green. During her reign, Kamille successfully defended her title against various contenders, such as Kiera Hogan, Melina and Taryn Terrell. On June 6, 2022, Kamille surpassed 365 days as champion. Couple of days later, on June 11, at Alwayz Ready, Kamille successfully defended her title against KiLynn King. On November 12, at Hard Times 3, Kamille defended her title in a three-way match against Chelsea Green and King where King submitted Kamille, however, the referee was distracted by Green. At the end, Kamille would retain her title after spearing Green.

On the January 31, 2023, episode of Powerrr, Kamille alongside her husband Thom Latimer were scheduled to face Psycho Love (Angelina Love and Fodder) in an intergender tag team match, however, Psycho Love ambushed Latimer and Kamille on the entrance way, leading to the match being cancelled. Love would later challenge Kamille for her title on Nuff Said in a no disqualification match, where on February 11, at the event, Kamille retained her title over Love. Kamille successfully defended her title against Natalia Markova on Night One of the NWA 75th Anniversary Show, but was defeated by Kenzie Paige on Night Two, ending her reign at 813 days.

In January 2024, Kamille's contract with NWA expired, and it was reported she was set to leave the company.

=== Lucha Libre AAA Worldwide (2022–2023) ===
On September 17, 2022, Lucha Libre AAA Worldwide announced that Kamille will replace Thunder Rosa to challenge Taya Valkyrie for the AAA Reina de Reinas Championship at Triplemanía XXX, as she successfully defended her NWA World Women's title against Valkyrie on August 27 at NWA 74. At the event, which took place on October 15, Valkyrie retained the title. On March 19, 2023, Kamille, alongside Deonna Purrazzo and Jordynne Grace, representing the United States, won the women's Lucha Libre World Cup after defeating Team Mexico (Flammer, La Hiedra and Sexy Star II) in the finals.

=== All Elite Wrestling (2024–present) ===
On April 29, 2024, Fightful reported Kamille had signed with All Elite Wrestling (AEW) in February 2024. On July 24 at Blood & Guts, Kamille made her official AEW debut as a heel by attacking Britt Baker and forming an alliance with AEW TBS Champion Mercedes Moné. On the July 31 episode of AEW Dynamite, Kamille made her AEW in-ring debut, defeating Brittany Jade in a squash match. On October 30 at Fright Night Dynamite, Kamille was defeated by Kris Statlander, suffering her first loss in AEW. On November 27 at Thanksgiving Eve Dynamite, Kamille split from Moné after weeks of mistreatment, thus turning face for the first time in her AEW career.

On April 12, 2026 at Dynasty, Kamille returned after over a year off television, attacking the reigning TBS Champion Willow Nightingale backstage and defeating Big Anne on the Zero Hour pre-show, reverting back to a heel. Three days later at Dynamite: Spring BreakThru, Kamille failed to defeat Nightingale for the TBS Championship.

== Other media ==
In Latimer's screen debut, she portrays June Byers in Queen of the Ring, a biopic of Mildred Burke.

Latimer participated in the 2026 season of American Gladiators under the name Hurricane.

== Personal life ==
Latimer lives in Clarksville, Tennessee, where she previously worked as a real estate agent. She dated American professional wrestler Braun Strowman in 2014, and married English professional wrestler Thom Latimer in 2022.

== Championships and accomplishments ==
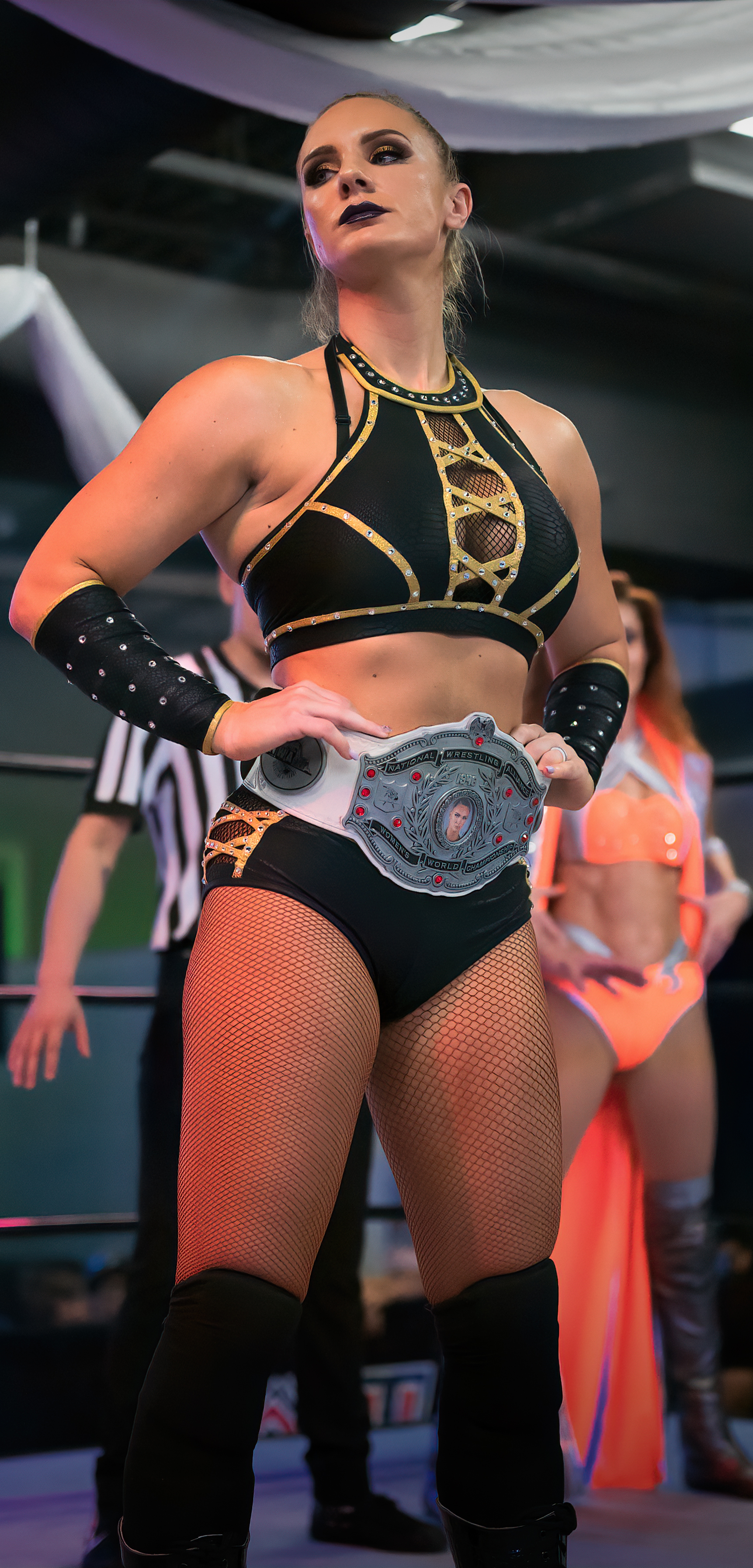
Kamille is a former NWA World Women's Champion

=== Fitness and figure competition ===
- National Physique Committee
  - NPC Daytona Beach Classic Bodybuilding Championship (2020)

=== Professional wrestling ===
- Lucha Libre AAA Worldwide
  - Lucha Libre World Cup: 2023 Women's division – with Deonna Purrazzo and Jordynne Grace
- National Wrestling Alliance
  - NWA World Women's Championship (1 time)
- Platinum Pro Wrestling
  - Diamonds Division Starlight Championship (1 time, inaugural)
- Pro Wrestling Illustrated
  - Ranked No. 23 of the top 150 female wrestlers in the PWI Women's 150 in 2022
  - Ranked No. 9 of the top 250 female wrestlers in the PWI Women's 250 in 2023
- Tried-N-True Pro Wrestling
  - Tried-N-True Women's Championship (1 time, current)
- Women's Wrestling Hall of Fame
  - WWHOF Award (1 time)
    - Pro Wrestler of the Year (2023)
