= Serena Deeb =

American professional wrestler

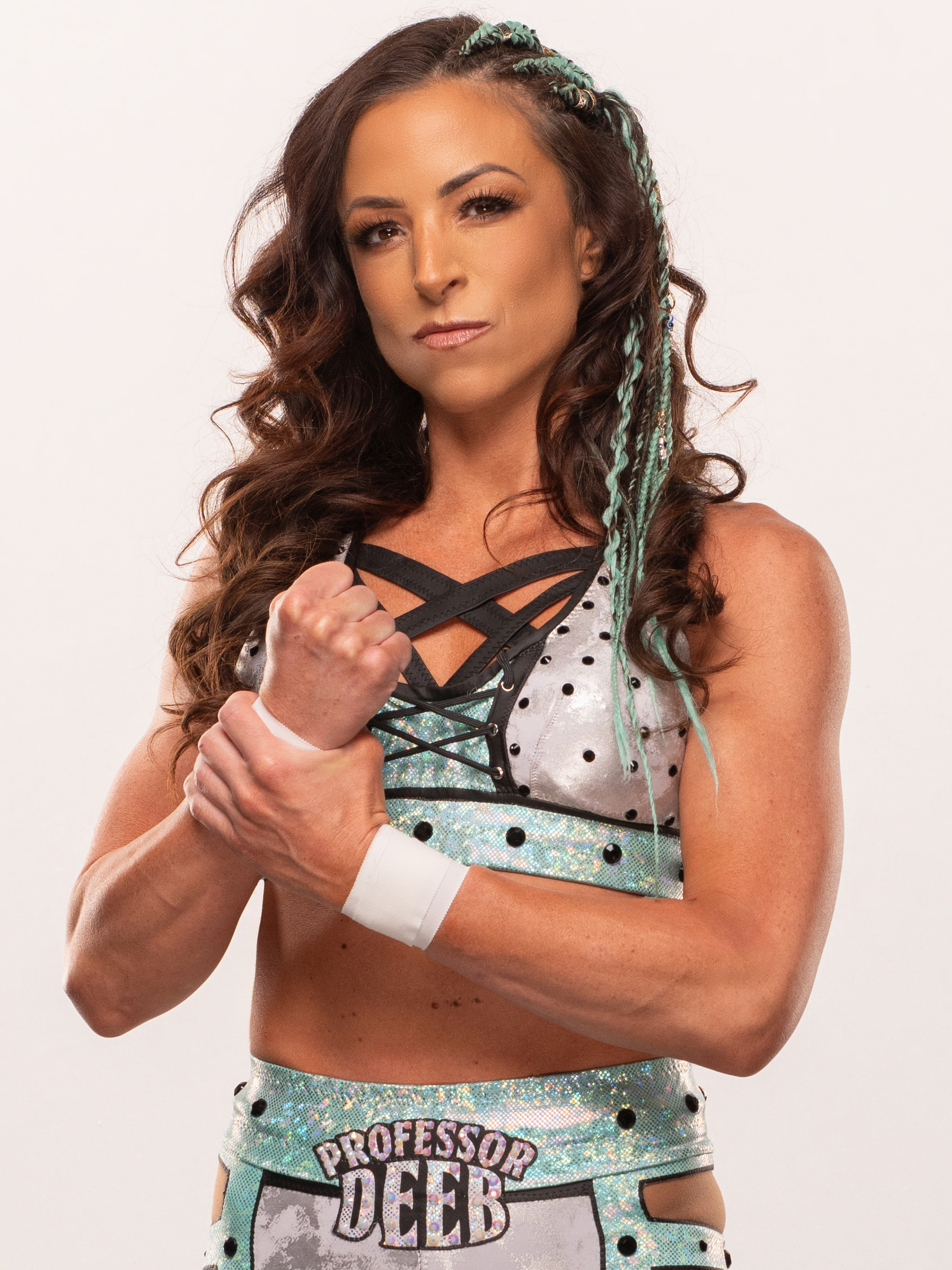
- Deeb in 2024

Personal information
- Born: June 29, 1986 (age 40) Fairfax, Virginia, U.S.
- Education: Indiana University Southeast

Professional wrestling career
- Ring name(s): Mia Mancini; Paige Webb; Serena; Serena Deeb; Serena Mancini
- Billed height: 5 ft 4 in (1.63 m)
- Billed weight: 130 lb (59 kg)
- Billed from: Fairfax, Virginia; Oakton, Virginia; Seattle, Washington
- Trained by: Al Snow; Greg Gagne; Les Thatcher; Nightmare Danny Davis; Rip Rogers; Robert Gibson; Steve Williams; Terry Taylor; Tom Prichard; WWE Performance Center
- Debut: November 2005

Serena Deeb (born June 29, 1986) is an American professional wrestler signed to All Elite Wrestling (AEW). She is well known for her first stint with WWE, appearing on the SmackDown brand and also known for her time with the developmental territory Florida Championship Wrestling, under the mononymous ring name Serena. She is a former NWA World Women's Champion, OVW Women's Champion and WNC Women's Champion.

== Early life and education ==
Deeb was born in Fairfax, Virginia, on June 29, 1986, and grew up in Oakton, Virginia. Deeb's love of wrestling began when she was eleven after watching a WWE show. However, her main passion as a child, from the age of five until she actively pursued wrestling at eighteen, was playing soccer.

Deeb graduated from Oakton High School in Vienna, Virginia in 2004. She attended Indiana University Southeast in New Albany, Indiana, where she graduated with a Bachelor of Arts degree in Spanish.

== Professional wrestling career ==
=== Ohio Valley Wrestling (2005-2009) ===
Serena started her wrestling career with the Ohio Valley Wrestling professional wrestling school, where she trained from March until November 2005 after relocating on her own money from Virginia to Kentucky to attend the school. She debuted on the November 4 OVW house show, teaming with Fuji Cakes in a losing effort against Shelly Martinez and Beth Phoenix. Beth Phoenix and Shelly Martinez also defeated her in January even with the new tag team partner of Venus (Rosa Salvage). She picked up her maiden victory over Shelly Martinez in February and over Beth Phoenix the following month. She and Fuji Cakes lost to Cherry Pie and Roni Jonah. Unhappy with the loss, Serena changed her partners and teamed with Roadkill and Kasey James for a mixed tag team match with The Untouchables, including Cherry Pie, but lost once more. Later that month, a dark match between her and Beth Phoenix ended in a no contest and was changed into a tag match, which Serena and Shelly Martinez lost to Beth Phoenix and Maria.

Serena then began to feud with ODB. In early June, Martinez guest refereed a tag team match where she and Daisy Mae defeated ODB and Sosay. At OVW's Six Flags event, ODB scored a return victory as she and Venus defeated Serena and Daisy. In her television debut at the June 21 tapings, Serena came out to save the participants of OVW's first bikini contest, who had been attacked by ODB. She defeated ODB in a singles match at another Six Flags show at the end of June but the two continued to feud, exchanging victories in mixed tag team and six-man tag team matches. Eventually, ODB declared herself the inaugural Women's Champion, supposedly after winning a tournament in Rio de Janeiro. ODB retained the title in an eight-woman Battle Royal on the September 6 television tapings but in a four-way match, Serena finally managed to win the Women's Championship during the main event of the September 13 episode of OVW TV involving ODB, Beth Phoenix and Katie Lea.

==== Women's Champion (2006–2008) ====
When she became champion, Serena was targeted by Beth Phoenix. She managed to retain her title on September 16's house show but lost a televised rematch on October 4. Serena instantly set her sights on winning back the title and commandeered an all-female six-man tag team victory over Beth Phoenix and her team three days later before interfering in Beth's title defence, spearing her to end the match in disqualification just as Phoenix was about to pin ODB. Though she would continue to interfere with Phoenix, Serena never had the chance to win back the title as Katie 'The Kat' Lea won the championship in the penultimate round of a gauntlet match Phoenix had to contest, losing on the sixth match while a refreshed Kat only had Serena to defend against. Serena tried to contend with The Kat once more for the title but the match ended in disqualification. To settle their dispute, Serena, The Kat and Beth Phoenix closed out the year with a non-title no-disqualification three way, which Serena won.

During 2007, Serena spent many weeks in a variety of tag team matches in an attempt to gain an opportunity at the Women's Champion and Phoenix too before competing in the Miss OVW Divalympics, though ODB would eventually win this competition. Serena went on an undefeated streak in March and April, but this was brought to a halt by Lea in May. On May 11, she and her team lost a 2/3 tug of war contest, but beat them in the wrestling tag match immediately afterwards. It would not be until September before she received another shot at the title. Milena Roucka picked up the victory in this six-way match-up, while Serena also lost a non-title match the following week in an attempt to prove her contendership. After spending the opening months of 2008 on a losing streak, Serena disappeared in February from the promotion.

During her hiatus, Serena got a nose job and breast implants in an attempt to get closer to a contract with World Wrestling Entertainment. Serena made a surprise return in late May when reigning champion Josie issued an open challenge, which Serena answered to win her second title. At the June 4 TV tapings, Serena stated her intentions to defend the title at all times, under 24/7 rules. Josie, who had assaulted her during the speech, took advantage of the rule in early July when Serena defended her title successfully against Reggie, only for Josie to attack her straight afterwards and win the title. Serena avenged this loss by similarly attacking Josie during a speech and winning the title back. The ruling proved too chaotic – at one point Serena gave a speech during which Josie and Melody attacked her, almost double-pinning her only for Reggie to come out and pin all three of them to win the title for a matter of minutes until Serena speared Reggie and won it back – and by August the 24/7 ruling was deactivated after Serena won the title back for an unprecedented sixth time.

After that wrestler Moose sought Serena's affections, eventually winning a right to a date after defeating Lumpy Magoo in late September. After being rebuffed by Serena on the date, Moose turned sour and tried to interfere in a championship defence against Josie only for Magoo, who was accompanying Serena, to make sure his interference did not cost her the title. On October 29, Serena teamed with Magoo and defeated Moose and Women's Championship contender Reggie in a tag team match. On November 12, Serena lost the championship to Melody in a four-way match with Josie and Reggie.

==== The Insurgency (2009) ====
In 2009, Serena turned heel for the first time in her career. This was signaled when she appeared on January 14 with The Insurgency, including Ali Akbar, Turcan Celik, and Bin Hamin, to help them win a non-title match against the Southern Tag Team Champions Totally Awesome. With Serena in their corner, The Insurgency went on a winning streak, though Serena herself could not emulate this as her title match with Melody on February 25 saw Melody retain the title via disqualification. On the 500th episode of OVW, she challenged Melody once again, this time in a steel cage match, but failed to win the championship.

=== Shimmer Women Athletes ===
==== Early feuds (2006–2007) ====
On October 22, 2006, Serena began working for SHIMMER Women Athletes at Volume 5 where she lost to Amber O'Neal in her debut match after O'Neal used Serena's tights to keep her down. She gained a victory in a rematch during Volume 6 with a roll-up pin. Despite this win, she went on a losing streak in both tag team and singles competition until she reversed Lexie Fyfe's Attitude Adjuster into a roll-up during Volume 10. Later at Volume 14: Hot Summer Nights Fyfe defeated Daffney and, after exposing her long-suffering knee injury, proceeded to assault her after the match with Experience tag team partner Malia Hosaka. Daffney's friend MsChif and Serena, having history with Fyfe, came to clear the ring leading to a match-up between Hosaka and Serena after the others had been chased off. Serena pinned Hosaka after a spear but her revenge was short-lived, as The Experience pinned her after a double inverted suplex slam, despite help from Allison Danger.

==== Pursuit of the Shimmer Championship (2007–2009) ====
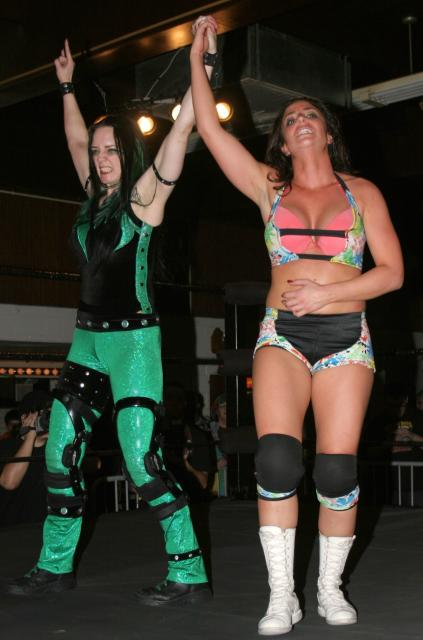
Serena failed to win the SHIMMER Championship in October 2008, but earned the respect of champion MsChif.

En route to the tournament to crown the inaugural Shimmer Champion, Serena was involved in a car crash and thus could not participate. An interview with her opened Volume 12, where she revealed her desire to challenge the eventual Shimmer Champion having missed out on her tournament opportunity, but still could not maintain a winning streak, falling victim to Rain and later her tag team partner Jetta. After being eliminated from a 20-woman Battle Royal to determine the Shimmer Championship contender during Volume 19, Serena pinpointed champion Sara Del Rey for her next match, but came up short. On Volume 21, Serena maintained she demanded another title match, blaming her loss on an injury. Sara Del Rey refused, calling her "bottom of the barrel" but an impromptu brawl turned into a sanctioned match, in which Serena once again put up a strong effort but lost. The event closed with Serena talking backstage about how the defeat would not stop her in trying to become champion at which point MsChif, the Shimmer Champion, commended her drive and ambition and offered her a match on the condition of beating Del Rey.

At Volume 22 Del Rey's manager, Larry Sweeney, announced she did not need to face Serena having beaten her twice already and that Del Rey's only goal was to reclaim the Shimmer Championship. After the main event closed, Del Rey hit the ring and attacked MsChif until Serena appeared to fight in MsChif's corner; the referee quickly declared their impromptu bout another match where, after taking yet another severe beating, Serena finally managed to defeat Del Rey. After another post-match assault, MsChif came to save Serena making the event end with the Shimmer Champion raising Serena's hand. Despite a storied build up over the years, including a seldom used video package to hype the main event, Serena was unsuccessful in her match. Though she failed to win her title match, it seemed her rivalry with Del Rey wasn't over. As well as bouncing back over Cat Power, she had a competitive victory over Mercedes Martinez. After her match, Del Rey and Amazing Kong had a Shimmer Tag Team Championship shot against Ashley Lane and Nevaeh, which ended when they started using chairs against the champions. Despite having just wrestled, Martinez assisted Serena in clearing the ring and keeping Del Rey at bay. Their attempts at Volume 26 to form a successful tag team saw them come undone against Del Rey and Kong's brutish power.

=== Wrestlicious (2009) ===
Also in early 2009, Serena appeared in the fledgling all-female Wrestlicious promotion. In the camp show, Take Down she was known as "Webmistress" Paige Webb and debuted on the second episode of their television show which, while being recorded in early 2009, was not broadcast until March 2010 after she had begun to appear in WWE. In her first singles match she lost to "Ice Princess" Autumn Frost and won her first match on the fifth episode, where she teamed with Charlotte to take on the team of Hope and Faith.

=== WWE (2009-2010) ===
On the May 19, 2009, episode of World Wrestling Entertainment's ECW on Sci Fi, Serena was seen standing backstage while Finlay was walking to the ring. Though Serena initially denied she signed with WWE, Shimmer promoter Dave Prazak confirmed that a contract had been negotiated on July 1, 2009.

==== Florida Championship Wrestling (2009–2010) ====
Serena made her debut on July 15, 2009, at a Florida Championship Wrestling house show where she teamed with Maria and Angela Fong to win against the team of Natalya, Layla and Alicia Fox in a six Diva Tag match. In her televised debut match, Serena defeated Layla. Her ring name was soon changed to Serena Mancini and once again to Mia Mancini, portraying the character of a mafia boss's daughter. On August 14, Mancini pinned April Lee in a four-way match during the TV taping for FCW's fiftieth episode to win a future opportunity to compete against Angela for her Queen of FCW crown. She followed up on September 3, though it would not air until October 4, with a win over Angela to become the second Queen of FCW. While defending her crown, Mancini began taking on WWE Divas from the televised roster, defeating Tiffany, Natalya, Savannah and Gail Kim. Later in September, Mancini was involved in a backstage segment which was unacknowledged by the commentary team where a mysterious man told her to lose her match against Angela, though she would refuse to. At the February 4, 2010, FCW television tapings, AJ Lee defeated Serena, who incorporated her SmackDown character into the Mancini role, to become the new Queen of FCW. When Matt Martlaro announced that there would be a creation of the FCW Divas Championship, Serena competed in the tournament to determine the inaugural Champion, during which she defeated Aksana and AJ Lee en route to the final where she was defeated by Naomi Night.

==== Straight Edge Society (2010) ====
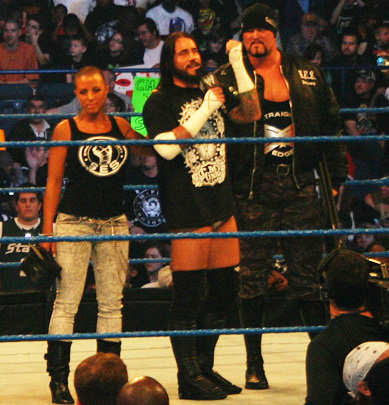
The Straight Edge Society (left to right): Serena, CM Punk, and Luke Gallows

On the January 22, 2010, edition of SmackDown, Serena appeared, playing the part of an audience member, before jumping over the crowd barrier to join CM Punk's group of straight edge followers; as part of the initiation, she agreed to have her head shaved bald. In a later podcast interview with wrestling journalist Brady Hicks, Serena said of the head shaving: "It was a really unique opportunity. Seeing a woman getting her head shaved was so rare, you don't see it all that often in the history of wrestling. Getting to do it as my debut was really, really cool, and really powerful. I was also very scared about what I was going to look like. There were a lot of uncertainties, but it ended up being really, really great for my career." One week later, she reappeared with Punk and Luke Gallows, now as a member of villainous group the Straight Edge Society, for their match against D-Generation X for the Unified WWE Tag Team Championship. However, Theodore Long changed the title match and instead set up a singles match between Punk and Triple H, during which she and Gallows attacked Triple H, disqualifying Punk in the process. On the July 2, 2010, edition of SmackDown, Serena unwillingly showed video security footage of her drinking alcohol at a bar as an alibi for Punk's whereabouts, raising the ire of The Society; she was forgiven by Punk the next week, though Gallows showed signs of disapproval. This incident was the first of many signs of trouble within the group, leading to Serena's first and only televised match in WWE on August 20 (taped August 17). In a match where she and Gallows would be expelled from The Society if they lost, the duo took on Big Show and Kelly Kelly in a mixed tag team match, where Serena used a gutbuster to pin Kelly. On August 20, Serena was released from her WWE contract, reportedly for not "living out" her straight edge persona in public. Because SmackDown was pre-recorded, her release was not revealed immediately, which gave her one last appearance, airing on August 27 as a valet to Punk and Gallows in separate matches.

=== Return to Shimmer (2010–2011; 2013) ===
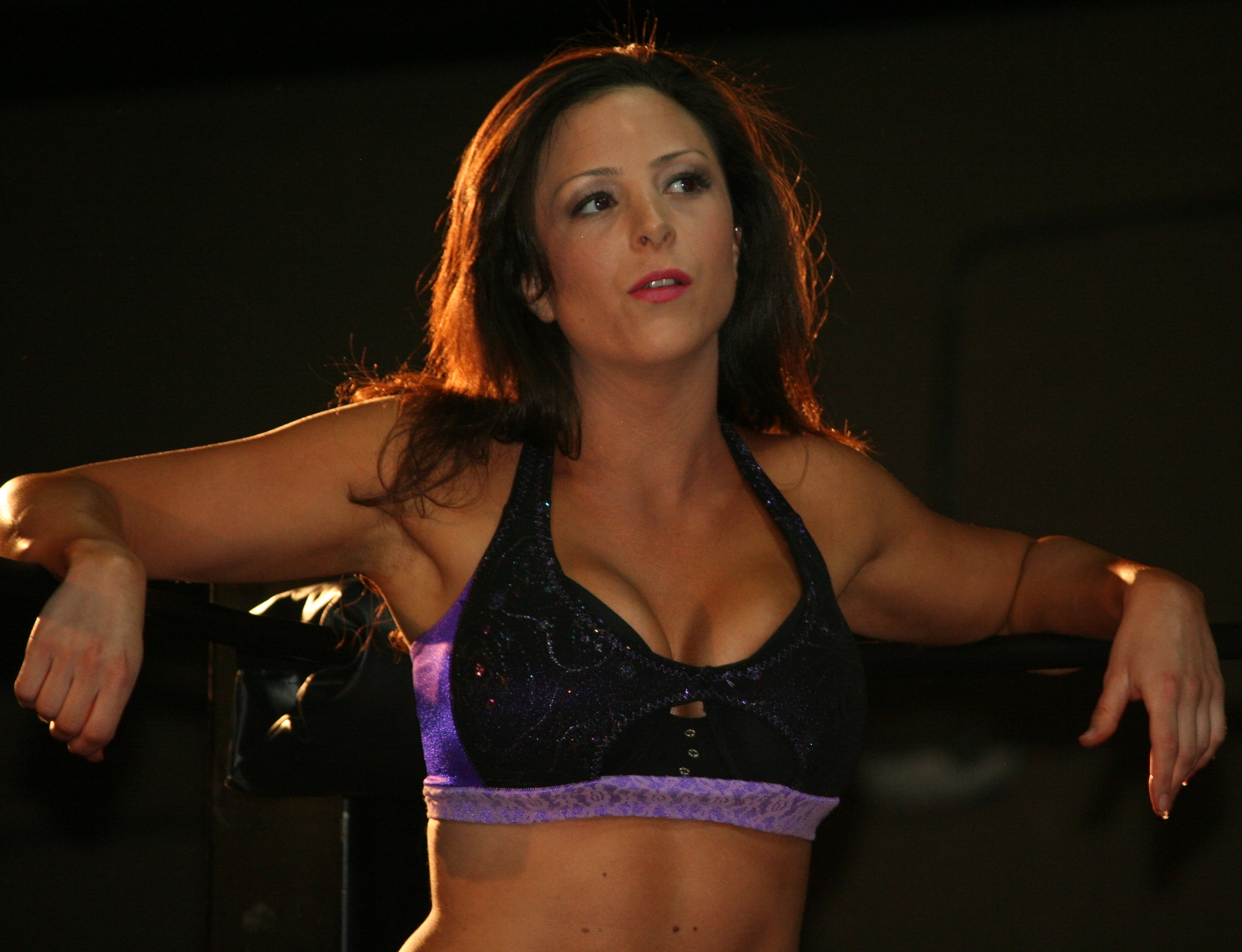
Deeb in 2013

On September 11, 2010, at the Volume 33 taping for Shimmer, Serena made a surprise return to the promotion, answering Kellie Skater's open challenge and defeating her in a singles match. She then had a verbal confrontation with former partner Portia Perez who accused her of selling out by going to WWE which led to a match at Volume 35 where Serena submitted to a crossface after the referee was distracted from seeing Serena reaching the ropes. She then rekindled her rivalry with Sara Del Rey, who made a speech criticizing her, leading to Serena main eventing Volume 36 in a Four-on-Four Tag Team Elimination match where Serena was eliminated second after Tomoka Nakagawa. In March 2011, Serena defeated Daizee Haze on Volume 37 and was victorious in a tag team match on Volume 38. Serena continued her rivalry with Portia Perez on Volume 39, defeating her via DQ. On Volume 40, Serena defeated Portia Perez, Cheerleader Melissa, and LuFisto in a four-corner survival match to earn a shot at the Shimmer Championship. She got her shot on Volume 41 in October but was defeated by Madison Eagles. Serena lost to Nicole Matthews on Volume 42 after interference from Portia Perez. Serena finished her rivalry with Portia on Volume 43 by defeating her in a no holds barred match.

After 18 months off due to injury, Serena made her return for Shimmer Women Athletes as part of WrestleCon on April 6, 2013. In her return match at the Volume 53 internet pay-per-view, Serena teamed with Allison Danger and Leva Bates to defeat The Midwest Militia (Jessicka Havok, Nevaeh and Sassy Stephie) in a six-woman tag team match, pinning Nevaeh for the win. Afterwards, Serena was attacked by Havok.

=== Independent circuit (2007–2015) ===
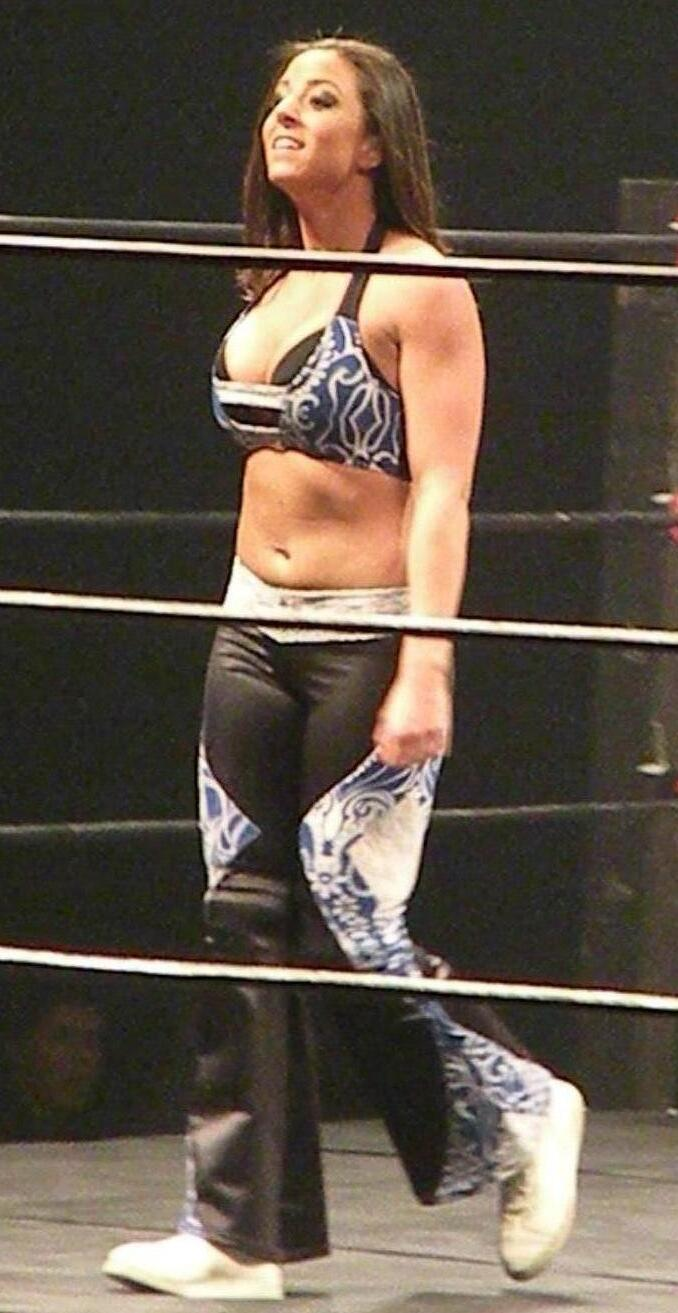
Serena Deeb wrestling in Paris in March 2009

Due to Shimmer's working relationship with Ring of Honor (ROH), Serena began to make occasional appearances for ROH in 2007 as part of February's Fifth Year Festival, she teamed up with MsChif in a losing effort to the Dangerous Angels (Danger and Del Rey). In the middle of the year she was similarly unsuccessful against Lacey at United We Stand and afterwards received a beating from her Age of The Fall partners Rain and Jimmy Jacobs until Haze saved her. She also came out on the losing end of a Shimmer guest match at 2008's Southern Hostility in a four corner survival match. She returned to ROH for their year-end internet pay-per-view Final Battle 2010 teaming with long-term rival Del Rey against Daizee Haze and Amazing Kong, winning the match after taking out Kong with a spear to let Del Rey pin Haze.

Serena appeared at Total Nonstop Action Wrestling's pay-per-view Slammiversary in June 2008, where she took part in Awesome Kong's $25,000 Fan Challenge in a three-minute squash match, as did fellow OVW and Shimmer wrestler Josie, who signed a contract with the company.

In November 2008 at a Pro Wrestling Syndicate show, Serena wrestled Daffney for the vacant NWA France Women's Championship, which she won. After winning the title, Serena travelled to France to defend the title under the International Catch Wrestling Alliance the following month. At Revolution V in Lille, she defended the title against three-time champion Bella Punk. Despite landing her Spear finisher, Punk's accomplice Gangrel turned the lights out in the arena from which Punk took advantage and pinned Serena after a spike DDT. Serena accompanied Joe E. Legend in the main event against Gangrel, which the latter won.

Serena found herself back in France during March 2009 for American Wrestling Rampage's nine-day tour of France. For most of the events, Serena wrestled fellow Shimmer wrestler Portia Perez, who was the only other woman on the tour. After two losses, Serena managed to pick up a victory but would only gain one more from their eight singles matches. On the final night, she teamed up with Scotty The Hotty to gain a third victory over Perez and Chris Masters in a tag team match.

In November 2010, Serena debuted for Women Superstars Uncensored (WSU) and established herself as a villainess by cutting a promo stating that she should be handed a title shot because she was in WWE. Serena would later gain a victory over Traci Brooks on WSU's first internet pay-per-view (iPPV). Serena followed up by winning a Four Way match over Alicia, Portia Perez and Jana to become number one contender to the WSU Championship. Deeb would target WSU Champion Mercedes Martinez by attacking her after a title defense late that evening and cutting some of Martinez's hair. Serena received her title shot in the main event of WSU's 4 Year Anniversary show where she was defeated by Mercedes. On June 25, 2011, at The Uncensored Rumble IV event Serena defeated Nikki Roxx but was eliminated from the eponymous match by Lexxus, having made it to the final two.

In January 2011, Serena made her first excursion to Japan. While working for Yoshihiro Tajiri's promotion Smash, she wrestled Syuri at Smash.12 and won the match. She remained undefeated by beating Makoto on Smash.13, Kana on Smash.17, Tomoka Nakagawa on Smash.19 in the first round and Syuri on Smash.20 in the semifinals of a tournament for the Smash Diva Championship. On September 8, Serena suffered her first loss in Smash, when she was defeated by Kana in the finals of a tournament to crown the first ever Smash Diva Champion.

On April 19, 2011, Deeb wrestled a dark match in Total Nonstop Action Wrestling, however she lost to Winter.

On October 22, 2011, Deeb announced that she was taking an indefinite break from wrestling, following her doctor's instructions after suffering a serious concussion. Her break ended up lasting eighteen months.

On March 17, 2013, Deeb returned to TNA to take part in the tapings of the Knockout Knockdown pay-per-view, where she was defeated by Mickie James. On July 25, Deeb returned to Japan to work for Smash's follow-up promotion, Wrestling New Classic (WNC), unsuccessfully challenging Lin Byron for the WNC Women's Championship in the main event of a show at Shinjuku Face. Three days later, Deeb made her debut for the JWP Joshi Puroresu promotion, teaming with Hanako Nakamori and Morii in a six-woman tag team match, where they were defeated by Kayoko Haruyama, Leon and Tsubasa Kuragaki. On August 3, Deeb entered a three-woman round-robin tournament for the vacant WNC Women's Championship, defeating Makoto in her first match. On August 8, Deeb defeated Syuri in her second round-robin match, advancing to the finals of the tournament. On August 10, Deeb defeated Syuri in the finals to win the tournament and become the new WNC Women's Champion. Continuing her tour of Japan, Deeb made her debut for the World Woman Pro-Wrestling Diana promotion on September 8, teaming with Makoto in a tag team match, where they were defeated by Crazy Mary and Mima Shimoda. On September 18, Deeb lost the WNC Women's Championship to Syuri in her first defense.

On January 24, 2014, Deeb made her debut for Shine Wrestling, defeating Santana Garrett in a singles match. Following the main event, Deeb joined the promotion's top villainous stable, Valkyrie. Deeb challenged for the Shine Championship against Ivelisse at Shine 20, with their match ending in a time-limit draw.

On March 21, 2014, Deeb debuted for Queens of Combat as a heel at the promotion's first show, competing in a losing effort to Taeler Hendrix.

=== Semi-retirement (2015) ===
On June 17, 2015, Reina Joshi Puroresu's promotion announced that Deeb would be wrestling her retirement match for the promotion on July 10 in Korakuen Hall. Deeb confirmed this would be her final match on July 9. The following day, Deeb was defeated by Syuri in her retirement match.

Despite her retirement, Deeb made an appearance for TNA on the June 25, 2015, episode of Impact Wrestling in an intergender tag team match. She teamed with James Storm in a losing effort against Mickie James and Magnus.

=== Return to WWE (2017–2020) ===
Deeb returned to WWE for the first time in nearly 7 years, as part of the first Mae Young Classic on July 13, 2017, defeating Vanessa Borne in the first round. This was Deeb's first match since 2015. The following day, Deeb was eliminated from the tournament in the second round by Piper Niven. It was announced on February 8, 2018, that Deeb has been signed by WWE to become a coach at the Performance Center in Orlando, Florida. She was released on April 15, 2020, amid company-wide cutbacks due to the COVID-19 pandemic.

=== All Elite Wrestling (2020–present) ===
Deeb made her All Elite Wrestling (AEW) debut on September 2, 2020, episode of Dynamite, losing to NWA Women's Champion, Thunder Rosa. On September 21, AEW announced that she had signed with the promotion. On September 22, in her first appearance on AEW Dark, Deeb defeated Kilynn King, gaining her first victory in AEW. On October 27, 2020, Deeb faced Rosa again during United Wrestling Network's Primetime Live event, where Deeb defeated Rosa to become the NWA World Women's Champion for the first time in her career. Deeb also defeated Rosa on the November 18 edition of AEW Dynamite by retaining her NWA Women's title.

On the February 17, 2021, episode of Dynamite, Deeb competed in the AEW Women's World Title Eliminator Tournament, where Deeb lost to Riho in the first round at the American bracket. On March 5, Deeb confirmed that she injured her left knee. On May 19, Deeb returned to action taking on Red Velvet defending her championship, Deeb defeated Velvet resulting in Deeb retaining her NWA Women's title. At When Our Shadows Fall, Deeb lost the NWA Women's title to Kamille. On the October 6 episode of Dynamite, Deeb turned heel by attacking Hikaru Shida after she defeated her in a match. On October 27 episode of Dynamite Deeb had a rematch with Shida in the AEW TBS women's championship tournament which Deeb lost and resulted in Deeb attacking Shida again. Deeb would then start using the nickname “the professor” and hosting a “5 minute rookie challenge” where she dominates her inexperienced adversaries.

Deeb returned to wrestling after a fourteen-month hiatus due to seizures, defeating Robyn Renegade on the January 27, 2024 episode of Collision. Deeb became the number one contender for the AEW Women's Championship on the May 1 episode of Dynamite, defeating Mariah May after AEW Women's World Champion "Timeless" Toni Storm threw in the towel. At Double or Nothing on May 26, Deeb failed to defeat Storm for the title.

On the August 31 episode of Collision, Deeb would return in a four-way match for a shot at the TBS Championship. There, she would start a storyline with Queen Aminata where Deeb would interrupt her during a backstage interview where she offered Aminata to align with her, who declined. Deeb would go on the lose the match to Hikaru Shida later that night. Frustrated, Deeb attacked Aminata on the September 14 episode of Collision after she mocked Deeb for losing a match that night, officially reverting Deeb back into a heel in the process. A match between Deeb and Aminata then was made official for the following episode of Collision, where Deeb won. On the November 13 episode of Dynamite, Deeb came out to confront Britt Baker following Baker's win over Penelope Ford, to which Baker responded by saying "nobody cares" repeatedly towards Deeb and the camera. This was Baker's last AEW appearance until the buy-in of AEW All In on August 30, 2026, whereas Deeb continued to work matches on both AEW Collision and ROH on HonorClub into 2025.

== Personal life ==
Outside the ring, Deeb works as a yoga instructor. Deeb also works backstage for AEW as a coach for both men's and women's matches. In an interview with The Flagship to promote All Elite Wrestling in October 2022, Deeb said, "I’ve been coaching a little less because I’ve been wrestling more." In November 2023, Deeb revealed that she suffered three unprovoked seizures in October of the same year.

== Championships and accomplishments ==
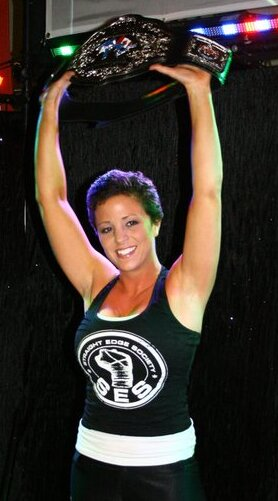
Deeb after winning the GLCW Ladies Championship in December 2010

- Florida Championship Wrestling
  - Queen of FCW (1 time)
- Great Lakes Championship Wrestling
  - GLCW Ladies Championship (1 time)
- Hometown Wrestling Entertainment
  - HWE Women's Championship (1 time)
- International Catch Wrestling Alliance
  - NWA France Women's Championship (1 time)
- Memphis Championship Wrestling
  - MCW Women's Championship (1 time)
- National Wrestling Alliance
  - NWA World Women's Championship (1 time)
- Ohio Valley Wrestling
  - OVW Women's Championship (6 times)
- Pro Wrestling Illustrated
  - Ranked No. 11 in the top 150 female wrestlers in the PWI Women's 150 in 2021
  - Ranked No. 16 of the top 50 female wrestlers in the PWI Female 50 in 2011
- Wrestling New Classic
  - WNC Women's Championship (1 time)
  - WNC Women's Championship League (2013)
- WrestlePro
  - WrestlePro Women's Championship (1 time)
