= Mayra Dias Gomes =

Brazilian writer

- Born: 15 December 1987 (age 38); Rio de Janeiro, Brazil
- Occupations: Novelist, media personality, reporter, wrestler
- Website: mayradiasgomes.com

Mayra Dias Gomes (born 15 December 1987) is a Brazilian author, reporter, media personality, model, and professional wrestling personality. She performs under the ring name May Valentine on NWA Powerrr.

== Early life ==
Mayra Dias Gomes is a Brazilian writer. She was born in Rio de Janeiro and went to the American School of Rio de Janeiro until she was fifteen years old, where she learned to speak and write in English. She is the oldest daughter of acclaimed playwright Dias Gomes and actress Bernadeth Lyzio, and goddaughter of writers Jorge Amado and Zélia Gattai. Mayra grew up in an artistic environment focused on literature, theatre and television and started writing when she was still a child. She began writing in diaries, where she would detail her life on a daily basis, since she was eight years old. While she was a kid, her favorite activities included writing and producing scripts and plays, and writing music as well.

== Books ==
Mayra wrote her first book, "Fugalaça", when she was seventeen years old. At age nineteen, her book was published by Editora Record (the largest publishing company in Latin America.) Mayra wrote "Fugalaça" while she was battling with depression. The author revealed that she went through a catharsis while working on her first novel. The book became an immediate phenomenon amongst Brazilian teenagers and a portrait of a generation unable to deal with frustrations. Satine, the narrator, is the author's alter ego. Both suffered with the sudden death of their father during pre-adolescence and became involved with a world of drugs, obsessive and destructive relationships and rock'n'roll. The book's foreword was written by Fernanda Young. In 2014, "Fugalaça" was published by Arara-Verlag at the Frankfurt Book Fair, in Germany, under the title "Brazilian Underground: Die Geschichte von Satine".

In her second novel, "Mil e Uma Noites de Silêncio" ("One Thousand and One Nights of Silence"), the author wrote about a fictional character, Clara, a lonely girl who searches for a human bond. Abandoned by her biological parents, stood up by her fiancé on her wedding day, and an orphan due to the death of her adoptive mother, Clara is a lifeless, depressed girl. Her days drag with no motivation and living is nothing but a meaningless ritual. Scarred by abandonment, she is unable to integrate in society and is a collector of sleepless nights. When she goes through yet another heartbreak, Clara decides to take control of her life and travels to the city of Bangônia, in search of an idealistic friend she once had. There, besides Camille, Clara finds herself in a world of prostitution, drug trafficking and glam rock, finding her own lost youth and breaking her own taboos. The foreword is by Brazilian author Santiago Nazarian.

In 2012, Mayra published her third book, "Dias Gomes", alongside her sister Luana Dias Gomes and their mother, Bernadeth Lyzio. The book is a collection of interviews given by their father, Dias Gomes, from the sixties to his death in 1999, and show the evolution of his ideas, while reflecting on the changes that occurred in Brazil during that period.

In 2015, Editora Record published Mayra's third novel, "Finalmente Famosa" ("Finally Famous"), a suspense thriller based in a real murder that occurred at the Hollywood Hillview, on the Walk of Fame, the building where Mayra first lived when she moved to Hollywood in 2010. The foreword is signed by renowned Brazilian television writer Gloria Perez.

== Journalism career ==
After the success of her first novel, Mayra became a musical reporter at the largest newspaper in Brazil, Folha de São Paulo, and later a biweekly columnist. Her column "On The Road" talked about her adventures backstage at concerts and behind the scenes in general. In 2011, Mayra also became a collaborator for Folha Ilustrada, where she published interviews with the casts of "Twilight", "The Hunger Games", and "Mad Man", amongst many others.

Early on, she collaborated with Spin Earth, a website for Spin magazine. She also published stories on Brazilian magazines such as Teen Vogue, Isto É Gente, Viagem e Turismo, Época, Capricho, TPM, Trip and Sexy. She wrote a section called "People and Stories" for Contigo! Magazine (an equivalent to People magazine in the US), where she narrated the stories of Brazilian immigrants in the United States. She was also a columnist for VH1 Brazil's website, where she talked about Hollywood events and concerts. She was a host on MTV and talked about literature on the show Notícias MTV ("MTV News").

Mayra made a name for herself in Rolling Stone Brazil magazine when she published an article about Damien Echols, an American boy falsely accused, convicted and sent to death row for the murder of three children, in the case known as The West Memphis Three. She later wrote the foreword to the Brazilian version of "Devil's Knot", by Mara Leveritt, the most important book about the case. Rolling Stone also published her interviews with Arnold Schwarzenegger, Jennifer Lawrence, Woody Harrelson and Jesse Eisenberg, amongst others.

In 2014, Mayra published a story on Glamour magazine, where she revealed that she had been raped when she was fifteen years old by a boy in her school. Glamour magazine also later followed Mayra at the Oscars, and published her interview with Caitlyn Jenner. In Hollywood, Mayra did several red carpet events, including the premiere of "New Moon" and The Academy Awards. She also does cinema interview for UOL, and has interviewed stars such as Vin Diesel, Tina Fey, Whoopi Goldberg, and the Muppets, amongst others.

She collaborated with American magazine The Hollywood Reporter and wrote about her investigations into the allegedly most haunted buildings and hotels in Hollywood.

== Modeling ==
In September 2007, Mayra posed for VIP Magazine. In August 2009, she participated in a shoot with Playboy magazine. In 2009, she was the cover and centerfold of Sexy magazine. Mayra was the poster girl for the Los Angeles Brazilian Film Festival in 2011. In 2023, she became the February cover and centerfold of Playboy Denmark. After Playboy, her modeling career took off, and she landed covers on multiple magazines such as FHM US, FHM Canada, Cosmopolitan Middle East, Forbes Morocco, and Vogue Sweden.

== Personal life ==
In 2010, Gomes married Canadian actor and musician Coyote Shivers in Las Vegas and was taken to the altar by Barbara Ramone, the widow of Dee Dee Ramone. They divorced in 2018.

== Wrestling ==
Mayra joined professional wrestling in December 2019, debuting on NWA Powerrr and becoming a member of the NWA (National Wrestling Alliance) roster as May Valentine. She was brought into the company by NWA President and Smashing Pumpkins frontman Billy Corgan. She initially played the girlfriend of Royce Isaacs of The Wildcards and Strictly Business. She then moved to broadcasting, in the role of backstage reporter and announcer. She was the reporter at the NWA EmPowerrr pay-per-view, the first ever all women's NWA pay-per-view in 75 years.

In 2023, she played the girlfriend of Aaron Stevens, and became engaged to Aaron in the storyline, which led to a very popular wedding segment on NWA’s first live Powerrr.

Mayra was trained by Future Stars of Wrestling and Royce Isaacs.
