= Taryn Terrell =

American professional wrestler and model

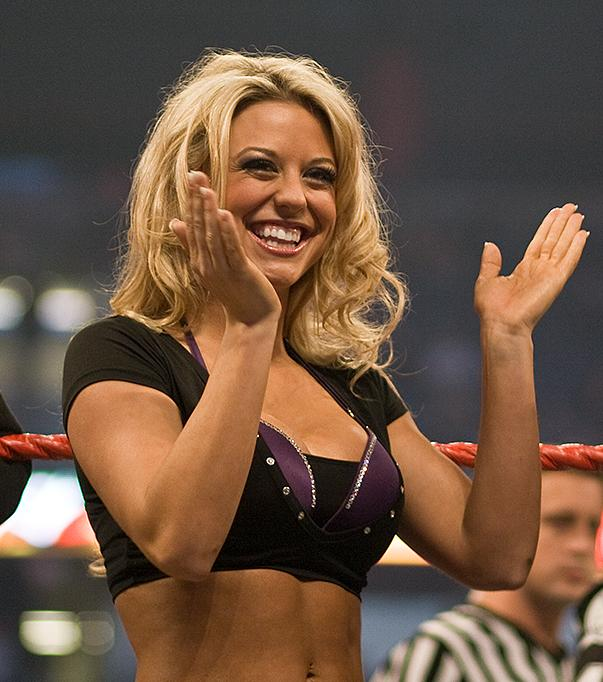
- Terrell as Tiffany in 2008

Personal information
- Born: Taryn Nicole Terrell; December 28, 1985 (age 40) New Orleans, Louisiana, U.S.
- Spouses: Drew McIntyre (m. 2010; div. 2011) Joseph Dryden (m. 2015)
- Children: 2

Professional wrestling career
- Ring name(s): Taryn Terrell; Tiffany
- Billed height: 5 ft 6 in (1.68 m)
- Billed weight: 125 lb (57 kg)
- Billed from: New Orleans, Louisiana
- Trained by: Dusty Rhodes; Steve Keirn; Tom Prichard
- Debut: 2007
- Occupations: Professional wrestler; model; actress; stuntwoman; ring announcer
- Known for: NWA Powerrr; Impact Wrestling; WWE ECW; WWE Smackdown; Monday Night Raw

Taryn Nicole Dryden (née Terrell; born December 28, 1985) is an American model, actress, stuntwoman, ring announcer and professional wrestler. She is best known for her tenures in Total Nonstop Action Wrestling (TNA), under her real name, and in WWE, where she performed under the ring name Tiffany.

She was a former TNA Knockouts Champion while being in the TNA Knockouts Division, where her 279-day reign stood as the longest reign in the title's history until 2019. During her time in WWE, she trained at WWE's then-developmental territory, Florida Championship Wrestling (FCW), and served as the final general manager of the now-defunct ECW brand. She worked in National Wrestling Alliance (NWA) from 2021 up until her retirement on November 10, 2022.

== Professional wrestling career ==
=== World Wrestling Entertainment (2007-2010) ===
==== Florida Championship Wrestling (2007–2010) ====
Terrell tried out for the 2007 WWE Diva Search. She made it to the final eight, but was eliminated fourth. In February 2008, WWE signed her to a developmental contract.

Terrell debuted in Florida Championship Wrestling (FCW), WWE's developmental territory, alongside Beverly Mullins, and they competed in various matches together, including lingerie matches. Soon afterwards, Terrell and Mullins drifted apart, leading to Terrell receiving a larger singles wrestling role as she competed against various other FCW Divas, including Mullins (now renamed to Wesley Holiday), Miss Angela, The Bella Twins, Alicia Fox, and Roucka. Terrell made her FCW television debut when she competed in a twist competition, which ended in a no contest. She and Angela were then used as ring announcers. On the March 11, 2008, episode of FCW TV, Terrell teamed up with Nic Nemeth and Brad Allen to defeat The Puerto Rican Nightmares (Eric Pérez, Eddie Colón and Angela Fong). On the August 2, 2008, episode of FCW TV, Terrell teamed up with The Bella Twins to defeat Alicia Fox, Roucka and Daisy and again on August 9, 2008.

Later on, Terrell, now renamed Tiffany, lost her first FCW televised match in a fatal four-way match including Roucka, Holiday, and Fox. She then teamed with Nikki Bella and Eve Torres on the December 14 episode of FCW TV to defeat Roucka, Holiday, and Fox. Tiffany participated in the tournament to determine the inaugural Queen of FCW, and defeated Holiday in the first round before losing to Fox in the semi-finals. She teamed up with Angela Fong on several occasions, and also competed against Serena Mancini, AJ Lee, and Fox in a four-pack challenge to determine the new number one contender to the Queen of FCW crown, but was unsuccessful.

On July 30, 2009, episode of FCW TV, Tiffany tamed up with Angela Fong and April Lee to defeat Alicia Fox, Roucka and Serena Deeb in a 6-Diva tag team match. On the August 6 episode of FCW TV, Tiffany and Yoshi Tatsu defeated Fox and Ricky Ortiz in a mixed tag team match. Tiffany unsuccessfully challenged the newly crowned Serena Mancini for the Queen of FCW crown and injured her humerus bone, on the September 24 taping of FCW TV. She returned on the February 19, 2010, episode of FCW TV, teaming with Aksana to defeat Courtney Taylor and Liviana in a tag team match.

==== Brand switches (2008–2010) ====
On the June 10, 2008, episode of ECW, Terrell made her main roster debut as Tiffany, the on-screen assistant general manager under Theodore Long. Tiffany participated in the Halloween costume contest on October 26 at the Cyber Sunday pay-per-view, and was dressed as a nun. Tiffany made her in-ring debut in a 16-Diva tag team match on the 800th episode of Raw teaming up with Mickie James, Candice Michelle, Michelle McCool, Brie Bella, Kelly Kelly, Eve Torres and WWE Hall of Famer Mae Young against Beth Phoenix, Layla, Lena Yada, Jillian Hall, Natalya, Maryse, Victoria and Katie Lea Burchill, which her team lost, despite Tiffany never being tagged into the match.

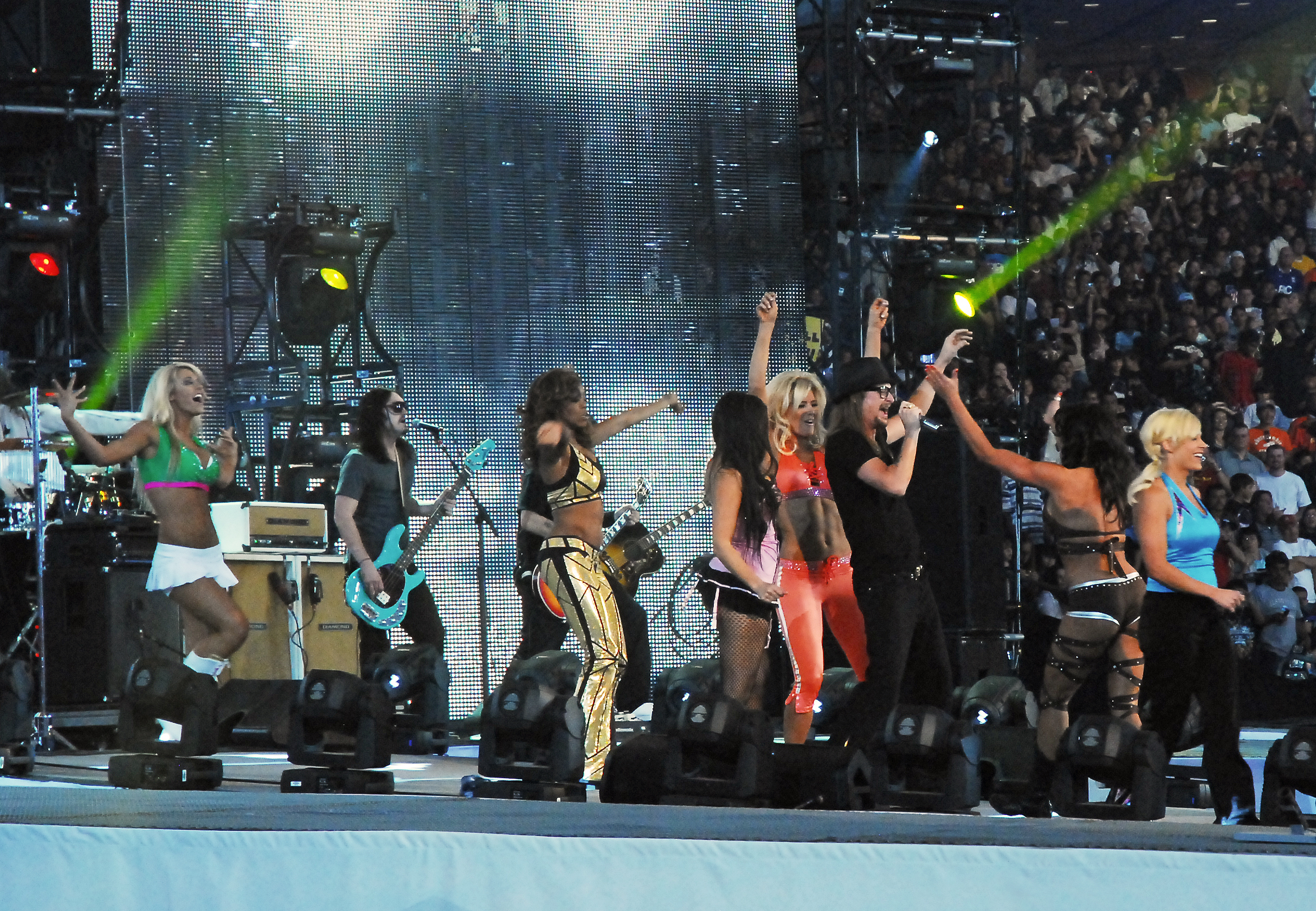
Tiffany (far left) at WrestleMania XXV in 2009

On the March 30, 2009, episode of Raw, Tiffany competed in an 18-Diva tag team match, which she won for her team by pinning Katie Lea Burchill. On April 5, Tiffany made her WrestleMania debut as she competed in a 25 Diva battle royal at WrestleMania XXV to crown the first-ever "Miss WrestleMania", which was won by Santina Marella. On the April 7 episode of ECW, Tiffany was announced by Theodore Long as the new general manager of ECW due to Long returning to SmackDown to again become its general manager. As the new general manager, her first order was to announce an elimination chase to determine who would face Jack Swagger for the ECW Championship at Backlash, with the participants being Mark Henry, Tommy Dreamer, Christian and Finlay, which Christian would ultimately win. In late June 2009, Tiffany was promoted to full-time general manager of ECW. However, Tiffany was absent from television due to a storyline car accident with William Regal. In reality, Tiffany had injured her arm in an FCW match. She returned on the October 6 episode of ECW. On the final episode of ECW on February 16, 2010, Tiffany speared Rosa Mendes after she and Zack Ryder interfered in the ECW Championship match.

On the March 5, 2010, episode of SmackDown, Tiffany made her debut for the brand in a backstage segment, being welcomed by Rey Mysterio. On the March 12 episode of SmackDown, Tiffany made her in-ring debut, winning a match against Michelle McCool via disqualification after Vickie Guerrero interfered. Following the match, McCool, Guerrero, and Layla attacked Tiffany, until she was saved by Beth Phoenix. The following week, Tiffany and Phoenix defeated McCool and Layla (collectively known as LayCool) in a tag team match, and again in a rematch on the April 2 episode of SmackDown.

Tiffany then formed an alliance with Kelly Kelly, with the pair being dubbed "The Blondetourage", and they continued to feud with LayCool. On the June 12 of SmackDown!, Tiffany lost her first singles match to Layla after an interference from McCool. On May 21 episode of SmackDown!, Tiffany and Kelly lost to LayCool in a tag team match. On the July 2 episode of SmackDown!, Tiffany managed Kelly where she defeated McCool, and during the match Tiffany stopped Layla from interfering. On the July 10 episode of Superstars, Tiffany and Kelly again lost to LayCool. On the July 16 episode of SmackDown!, Tiffany managed Kelly and Chris Masters where they defeated Layla and Trent Barreta after interference from Rosa Mendes. She also managed Kelly in her WWE Women's Championship match against Layla at Money in the Bank. On July 23 episode of SmackDown!, Theodore Long announced that Tiffany would receive a match for the Women's Championship, which occurred on the July 30 episode of Smackdown, however she failed to capture the championship. She was originally scheduled to fight Layla, however, she instead fought McCool, as the two defended the title under the Freebird rule.

On August 13, 2010, it was reported that WWE had suspended Terrell because of an incident involving her real-life husband, Drew McIntyre. Before she could return to WWE programming, Terrell was released from her contract on November 19, 2010.

=== Independent circuit (2010–2013) ===
On December 4, 2010, it was announced that Terrell would make her independent circuit debut in a match against Alissa Flash at the Pro Wrestling Revolution's ChickFight event in San Francisco, California, on February 5, 2011. On January 4, 2011, it was announced that Terrell had pulled out of the show, citing personal reasons. ChickFight later claimed that the promotion could not cater to Terrell's requests that she had made despite already having an agreement with the promotion.

On April 5, 2012, Terrell made her debut for Powerslam Brewsky Brawl, where she teamed up with Jack Jameson to defeat Barbi Hayden and Houston Carson. On April 8, Terrell made appearance at Coastal Wrestling Federation, where she teamed with Sho Funaki in a winning effort, again defeating Hayden and Carson. Earlier in that event, Terrell defeated Jen Alise in singles match. Terrell also appeared at Maryland Championship Wrestling's Bodyslam Autism event on April 27, 2013.

=== Total Nonstop Action Wrestling (TNA) (2012–2016) ===
==== Ohio Valley Wrestling (2012–2013) ====
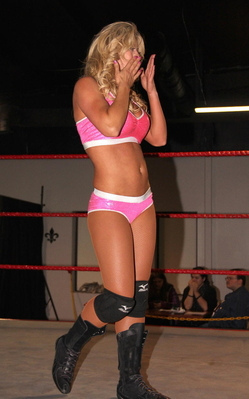
Taryn Terrell at an OVW Wrestling Saturday Night Special

On November 4, 2012, Terrell made her debut for Ohio Valley Wrestling (OVW), Total Nonstop Action Wrestling (TNA)'s then-developmental branch, at OVW's Saturday Night Special event, being introduced as the special guest referee for the OVW Women's Championship match between Josette Bynum, Taeler Hendrix, and Heidi Lovelace. During the match, Terrell ignited a feud with Hendrix after Terrell cost Hendrix the match, after she put her hands on Terrell. On the November 10 episode of OVW, Terrell was interrupted by Hendrix during an interview, who then provoked Terrell, only to get attacked in return. Later that event, Terrell refereed a tag team match between Lovelace, Jessie Belle against Hendrix and Epiphany.

Terrell made her in-ring debut on the November 17 episode of OVW, where she defeated Heidi Lovelace with Hendrix as special guest referee to win the OVW Women's Championship. On the November 24 episode of OVW, Terrell defeated Scarlett Bordeaux in a non-title match, but was attacked by Hendrix post-match. On the November 28 episode OVW, Terrell attacked Hendrix during an in-ring segment, but was stopped by Bostic. OVW announced that Terrell challenged Hendrix at OVW's Saturday Night Special to a match with the OVW Women's Championship on the line, with the stipulation that the loser will swim in a pool of "animal feces". At the event on December 1, Terrell lost the Women's Championship to Hendrix. After the match, Hendrix tried to attack Terrell, but she gained a measure of revenge when she moved out the way and Hendrix fell in the pool.

==== Knockouts referee and feud with Gail Kim (2012–2013) ====
On August 16, 2012, Terrell made her debut for TNA, being introduced by the Vice President of the Knockouts Division, Brooke Hogan, as the special guest referee for the Impact Women's Knockout Championship match between Madison Rayne and Miss Tessmacher. Terrell later became the official referee for the Knockouts division.

On January 13, 2013, at Genesis, Terrell began a storyline with Gail Kim after making a bad call during a gauntlet match, thus costing Kim's chance to become the number one contender to the Knockouts Championship. On the following episode of Impact Wrestling, Terrell appeared backstage with Kim, who told Terrell not to make another mistake. Later that night, during Kim's match with Velvet Sky, Kim would argue with Terrell, costing herself the match in the process. On the February 21 episode of Impact Wrestling, Terrell helped Sky defeat Tara, Miss Tessmacher and Kim in a fatal four-way elimination match, with Sky lastly eliminating Kim to win the Knockouts Championship after Kim provoked Terrell into getting involved in the match. On March 10 at Lockdown, towards the end of the Knockouts Championship match, Terrell would attack Kim, again costing her the title. After the match, Terrell was attacked by Kim backstage during an interview. On the following episode of Impact Wrestling, Kim revealed that Brooke Hogan put Terrell on probation for attacking Kim. In a tag team match between Mickie James and Velvet Sky against Gail Kim and Tara, Terrell would again cost Kim the match by attacking her.

On the March 21 episode of Impact Wrestling, Terrell was terminated as Knockouts referee by Hogan, and was subsequently signed as an impact Knockout. On the March 28 episode of Impact Wrestling, Terrell challenged Kim to a match, however the match never started when Kim and Tara attacked Terrell, only to be saved by the Knockouts Champion, Velvet Sky. On the April 4 episode of Impact Wrestling, Terrell and Sky were defeated by Kim and Tara after the special guest referee Joey Ryan made a fast count on Terrell. Terrell finally faced Kim in a match on the April 11 episode of Impact Wrestling, which Terrell won. On the May 2 episode of Impact Wrestling, Terrell and Mickie James defeated Kim and Tara. After the match, Kim attacked Terrell. The rivalry between Terrell and Kim culminated in a Last Knockout Standing match on June 2 at Slammiversary XI, which Terrell would win. On the July 11 episode of Impact Wrestling, Terrell was defeated by Kim in a ladder match to determine the number one contender to the Knockouts Championship. The following month, Terrell was granted time off from Impact Wrestling due to her real life pregnancy.

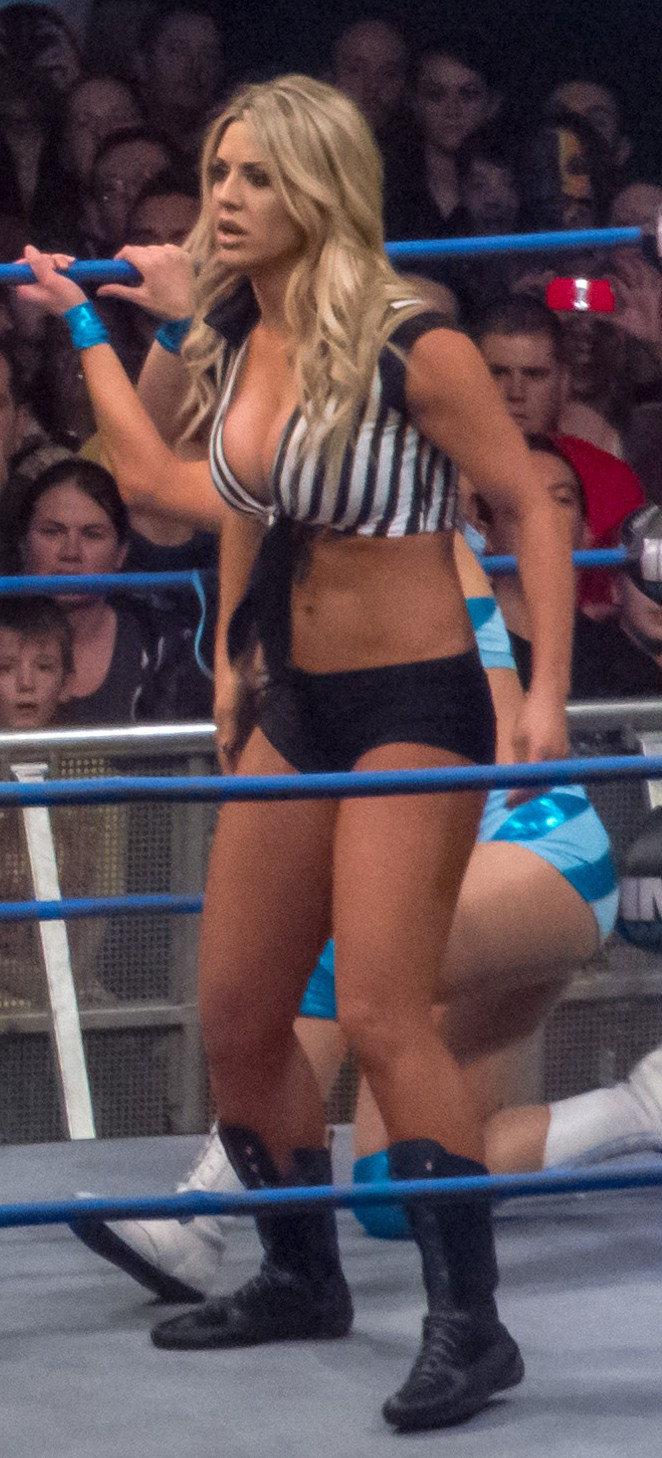
Taryn Terrell refereeing in 2013 in Impact Wrestling.

==== Knockouts Champion and departure (2014–2016) ====
Terrell made her televised return on the June 19, 2014, episode of Impact Wrestling, being welcomed by her former rival Gail Kim and later interrupted by The Beautiful People (Angelina Love and Velvet Sky). This led to Terrell's in–ring return, the following week on Impact Wrestling, where Kim and Terrell defeated Love and Sky in a tag team match. Terrell went on to unsuccessfully challenge Kim for the TNA Knockouts Championship on July 24 and on August 14 in a fatal four-way match also involving Love and Sky. After defeating the evil Madison Rayne on August 27 to become the number one contender, Terrell received her title match on the September 3 episode of Impact Wrestling, where she was again unsuccessful. After the match, both Terrell and Kim were attacked by the debuting Havok.

On the November 19 episode of Impact Wrestling, Terrell defeated newly crowned champion Havok and Gail Kim in a three-way match to win the TNA Knockouts Championship for the first time. On January 7, 2015, during Impact Wrestling's debut on Destination America, Terrell successfully defended the championship in a battle royal against the other TNA Knockouts, lastly eliminating Havok. Terrell went on to successfully retain her championship in various matches: on January 30 against Kim and Madison Rayne in a three-way match and against Angelina Love on February 20. After that Terrell started a feud with the recently returned Awesome Kong, after Kong attacked her. This led to a match between the two, on March 6, which Taryn won via disqualification and Kong would continue her attack after the match, with Kim making the save. This led to a three-way match, where Terrell again prevailed. On April 18, Terrell became the new longest reigning TNA Knockouts Champion in history, surpassing Kim's previous record of 210 days.

On the special episode of Impact Wrestling, titled TKO: Night of Knockouts on April 24, Terrell retained her championship against Kong in a no disqualification match after The Dollhouse (Jade and Marti Bell) interfered and attacked Kong, ultimately assisting Terrell in putting Kong through a table as a "receipt" for an earlier attack in which Kong put Terrell through a table. After the match, Terrell transitioned into a villainess for the first time in her wrestling career and joined The Dollhouse as their leader. Terrell retained her championship on the Hardcore Justice episode of Impact Wrestling on May 1, against Brooke, with help from Jade and Marti. In their first match as a team, the following week, The Dollhouse were defeated by Kong and Kim in a three–on–two handicap match. On the May 29 episode of Impact Wrestling, in a steel cage match, Terrell again retained her championship against Kim. At Slammiversary XIII, The Dollhouse were defeated by Kong and Brooke in another three–on–two handicap match. After successfully retaining her championship against Brooke and Kong in a three-way match, Terrell lost the championship to Brooke, on the July 15 episode of Impact Wrestling, after interference from Gail Kim, ending her reign at 279 days. After her loss, Terrell went on a hiatus citing a hand injury, courtesy of Kim but continued to appear in segments on the jumbotron, orchestrating attacks on various Knockouts. During her absence, Rebel joined The Dollhouse. On January 4, 2016, Terrell announced that she had parted ways with the company, describing her departure as a personal decision.

On October 2, 2016, Terrell made an appearance at Bound for Glory alongside Awesome Kong, Christy Hemme, and Chairman Dixie Carter to induct Gail Kim into the TNA Hall of Fame.

=== Return to Impact Wrestling (2017) ===
On August 17, 2017, at Destination X, Terrell made her return to the newly rebranded Impact Wrestling, attacking Gail Kim during her GFW Knockouts Championship match against Sienna. On the September 7 episode of Impact!, in her first match back after her one and a half year hiatus, Terrell teamed with Sienna and defeated Kim and Allie in a tag team match. On October 20, 2017, it was announced that Terrell had departed Impact Wrestling.

=== National Wrestling Alliance (2021–2022) ===
On March 21, 2021, Terrell made her debut for the National Wrestling Alliance (NWA) on commentary during the women's match between Thunder Rosa and Kamille. On the June 6, at When Our Shadows Fall, Terrell teamed with Kylie Rae and won their debut match against Thunder Rosa and Melina Perez. With her arrival to NWA, Terrell started managing Jennacide and Paola Blaze. The trio teamed together on August 29 at the pre-show of NWA 73rd Anniversary Show to challenge the NWA World Women's Tag Team Champions The Hex (Allysin Kay and Marti Belle), alongside Lady Frost in a six-woman tag team match, but were unsuccessful.

On February 12, 2022, at NWA PowerrrTrip, Terrell received a title match for the NWA World Women's Championship when she challenged the champion Kamille, but was unsuccessful. On the March 21 episode of Powerrr, as Blaze and Jennacide lost to Women's World Tag Team Champions The Hex in a title match, they were forced to dissolved as a team, due to a stipulation that was made before the match, thus ending Terrell managing the two. Terrell would quickly find an ally in Natalia Markova. On November 10, Terrell confirmed her retirement from professional wrestling and NWA departure.

=== Second Return to TNA Wrestling (2026-present) ===
On March 27, 2026, at Sacrifice, Terrell made her return as a babyface aligning with ODB and Mickie James.

== Acting career ==
Terrell made a special appearance on The Showbiz Show with David Spade in 2007. Terrell was featured in a segment on Lopez Tonight on August 4, 2010. She received her start in acting after appearing alongside Will Ferrell in the 2012 comedy film The Campaign. She was later hired as a stunt double for Kayla Ewell in the film The Demented.

== Filmography ==
Year	Film	Role	Notes
2012	The Campaign	Janette	
2013	Jake's Road	Sylvia	
2013	Empire State	Hot Guidette #1	
2013	Oldboy	Girl in park	
2014	Search Party	Kenny's Mom #2	
2015	Daddy's Home	New Orleans Pelicans Cheerleader	
2015	Aztec Warrior	Marcella	Completed
2015	N.O.L.A Circus	Sabrina	
2016	Abattoir	Drowning Woman	
2016	Bad Moms	Brie (uncredited)	
2016	Two Faces of Colin	Dr. Williams	Pre-production
2017	Kidnap	Pedestrian Girl	
Television
Year	Title	Role	Notes
2007	The Showbiz Show	Herself	
2007	K-Ville	Brothel girl	Episode: "Bedfellows"
2007–2009	Monday Night Raw	Tiffany	10 episodes
2008–2010	WWE ECW	Tiffany	63 episodes
2008–2010	WWE Smackdown	Tiffany	13 episodes
2012	Common Law	Yoga Girl	Episode: "Odd Couples"
2012	Treme	Cindy	6 episodes
2013	W.I.N.O.	Eve	TV movie
2015	NCIS: New Orleans	Shauna	Episode: "The List"
2012–2015	Impact Wrestling	Taryn Terrell	77 episodes
2021–2022	NWA Powerrr	Taryn Terrell	11 episodes
2022	The Winchesters	Soucouyant	Episode: “Art of Dying”
Stunts
Year	Title	Role	Notes
2012	The Demented	Stunt double	
2012	American Horror House	Stunt double	
2013	Now You See Me	Stunt double	
2013	Empire State	Stunt double	
2013	Pawn Shop Chronicles	Stunt double	
2013	This Is the End	Stunt double	
2015	Jurassic World	Stunt double	
2015	Get Hard	Topless girl on car	
Video games
Year	Title	Role	Notes
2010	WWE SmackDown vs. Raw 2011	Tiffany	Voice
DVDs
Year	Title	Role	Notes
2007	Women of Playboy	Herself	Model

== Personal life ==
"I told people before that some people grow up watching wrestling from day 1, that wasn't my case and I grew up as always as an athlete, I did powerlifting, cheerleading in school and college, it was in college when I had a friend whom was obsessed with wrestling, he told me that I have to come to a show, I told him okay I'll go. We had front row tickets and I was like OMG this what I wanted to do I figured out what I wanted to do for the rest of my life. I was so excited, there was this perfect hybrid of athleticism and beauty as a woman wrestler. This what you get to do is look beautiful and kick some ass, how frecking cool is this! This is my dream job and I'll do whatever to get in that ring and that's what I did."

— Terrell on becoming a wrestler

Terrell attended the University of New Orleans, majoring in marketing. Terrell is a co-leader for a volunteer mission group called Hope Children's Home that provides love and time to children that have been neglected, abused, and discarded. Terrell is a founder for a volunteer mission foundation called Cystic Fibrosis Foundation.

In 2008, Terrell became a vegan due to animal rights. However, she revealed she was no longer a vegan in 2010. She is also a convert to Christianity.

Terrell first appeared in Playboy in the special College Girls edition of January 2007. She next appeared in the February/March 2010 issue of the Playboy Lingerie Special Edition. The photos were an accumulation of previous photoshoots that she had done for the magazine prior to signing with WWE, and show her fully naked. She appeared again in Playboy in November 2010, in the special issue Big Boobs, Hot Buns, with the photos having been taken prior to her signing with WWE. Terrell has appeared in an issue of Maxim and on Sky Sports.com.

Terrell previously dated Alfonso Ribeiro in 2008. Terrell became engaged to Drew Galloway, who appears on-screen as wrestler Drew McIntyre, in July 2009. The couple married in Las Vegas in May 2010. On May 24, 2011, Terrell announced that she and Galloway were divorcing.

Terrell gave birth to a girl named Emerson on March 2, 2014. Terrell married professional motorcyclist and stunt man Joseph Dryden in 2015. And Terrell gave birth to her son named Rhett in 2017.

== Championships and accomplishments ==
- Ohio Valley Wrestling
  - OVW Women's Championship (1 time)
- Pro Wrestling Illustrated
  - Ranked No. 10 of the top 50 female wrestlers in the PWI Female 50 in 2015
- Total Nonstop Action Wrestling
  - TNA Knockouts Championship (1 time)
  - TNA Year End Award (1 time)
    - Knockout of The Year (2014)
