= Gregg Groothuis =

American professional wrestler (born 1970)

Personal information
- Born: May 1, 1970 (age 56) Orange, California, U.S.
- Website: Jack Bull on Myspace

Professional wrestling career
- Ring name(s): Jack Bull; Russian 54; New Jersey Power Warrior; Generic Barry Bland
- Billed height: 6 ft 5 in (1.96 m)
- Billed weight: 280 lb (130 kg)
- Billed from: Phoenix, Arizona
- Trained by: Ricky Reyes; Rocky Romero; Christopher Daniels; Tom Howard; Steve Islas; Al Snow
- Debut: February 2000

Gregg Groothuis (born May 1, 1970) is an American professional wrestler, known by his stage name Jack Bull, who competed in North American independent promotions including Impact Zone Wrestling, the National Wrestling Alliance and Ultimate Pro Wrestling as well as Japanese promotions HUSTLE, New Japan Pro-Wrestling and Pro Wrestling ZERO1.

In March 2005, Groothuis signed a developmental contract with World Wrestling Entertainment. He was initially assigned to Deep South Wrestling and then to Ohio Valley Wrestling at the end of the year. During his time in Ohio Valley Wrestling, his bitter feud with Joey Mercury finally ended with a surprise victory in December 2006.

== Career ==
=== Early life and career ===
Born in Orange, California, Gregg Groothuis moved to Venice, Florida where he spent most of his childhood. He began watching Championship Wrestling from Florida as early as 7 years old and was a fan of Sting, Dusty Rhodes and The Road Warriors (Hawk & Animal). His ring name was inspired by an interview by Dusty Rhodes in which he described looking into a ring full of bulls "..the head bull was the Jack Bull; the one who stood out from the others".

He excelled at sports during his teenage years, especially, track, weight lifting and football, where he was a top recruit from the State of Florida as a tight end. Graduating with Honors and President of Venice High School, he earned an athletic scholarship to Marshall University in Huntington, West Virginia and graduated with a B.A. in psychology and then a Master's in Science in organizational training and development. While at Marshall he played college football where he moved from tight end to center due to having two All Conference upperclassmen in front of him. This was until a devastating car accident ended his college football career.

He had met Marc Mero while working out at a local Venice gym. A former wrestler for World Championship Wrestling, Mero had been involved in running independent shows in Florida at the time and had offered to help him break into professional wrestling. However, already accepted to Marshall College, he instead declined the offer and instead chose to go to school.

While attending grad school, Groothuis was working part-time as a bouncer for a local bar. The particular bar that he worked at occasionally hosted wrestling events and, at one of these, he was asked to be a last minute replacement for a local wrestler that was unable to show up. He was offered training by the promoter, however he was in the middle of studying for his comps and final exams and turned the offer down. He began training in martial arts soon after this however, being taught by a prominent Japanese Ju-Jitsu master in the Huntington-area, and considered taking part in the Ultimate Fighting Championship but Gregg couldn't dedicate the time needed to excel while working full-time and preparing his Master's Thesis and studying for comps.

After receiving his post-graduate degree, Groothuis moved to Phoenix to help his mother and aunt with expanding their business. By this time, he decided to begin training at a wrestling school. He was originally going to train at Shawn Michaels' Texas Wrestling Academy in San Antonio, Texas, but instead chose to study at Bill Anderson's School of Hard Knocks school in San Bernardino, California after meeting Superstar Billy Graham.

He spent months training under Ricky Reyes and Rocky Romero with several other students including Pinoy Boy before making his debut in Ultimate Pro Wrestling. Through Ricky Reyes, Groothuis appeared at the promotion's Saturday light shows then held at the LA Boxing Club in Huntington Beach. Among his early opponents included Horshu, John Cena, John Heydenreich and Nathan Jones. He also had a memorable match with future Ultimate Pro and Pro Wrestling ZERO1 star Skulu training with him for over a month before meeting in the ring. UPW "Reunion": Season's Beatings, a dvd released by the promotion, featured a Four Corner match between himself, Ruckus, Bison and Horshu.

As well as wrestling in various Southwestern independent promotions, he also toured Japan with Pro Wrestling ZERO1, HUSTLE and New Japan Pro-Wrestling. Wrestling as the New Jersey Power Warrior and Russian 54, Groothuis appeared at Hustle 5 losing to Judo O at the Yokohama Arena and Hustle 6 where he and The Pirahnian Monster XX lost to Mr. USA & Katsuhisa Fujii at the Aichi Prefectural Gym in Nagoya, Japan. Both events were shown live on Japanese PPV. He also had a brief stint in IWA Puerto Rico as well as appearances in dark matches on WWE Velocity.

=== Impact Zone Wrestling ===
Moving back to Phoenix in 2002, Groothuis began training at Navajo Warrior's wrestling school. Later becoming an instructor there, he also began wrestling regularly for his Phoenix-based promotion Impact Zone Wrestling and eventually won the heavyweight title in a championship tournament two years later.

On February 5, 2003, Groothuis substituted for one of the IZW Tag Team Champions during a title defense against the Killer Klowns at the Rodeo Nights in Phoenix. Midway through the match however, Groothuis walked out on his partner allowing the Killer Klowns to win the tag team titles. Groothuis later won the IZW Tag Team Championship himself when he and Chris Kole defeated G.Q. Gallo & Lawrence Tyler on February 3, 2004. After they lost the titles, the two engaged in a long running feud which lasted half a year.

His feud with Chris Kole was finally reached its conclusion when he defeated him in a Loser Leaves Town match on August 17, 2004. In October, he beat Kharma and teamed with Hollywood Yates at an Ultimate Pro Wrestling losing to Rikishi & Skulu at the end of the month. Feuding with Lawrence Tyler during the next few weeks, he lost to Tyler on November 9 but came back to defeat him in a 2/3 falls match to retain the IZW Heavyweight title on November 23.

Defeating Nick DeCarlo on January 4, 2005, he suffered a disqualification loss to Bryan Danielson that same month. On February 1, he beat Cowboy Jack Durango and, two weeks later, teamed with Navajo Warrior & Hawaiian Lion in a 6-man tag team match defeating Lawrence Tyler, Jack Durango & Train on February 15. On March 1, he lost a match against Train for the IZW Heavyweight title. The following day, he signed a developmental contract with World Wrestling Entertainment. Other IZW mainstays such as Derrick Neikirk, Antonio Mestre and Lawrence Tyler were also signed to WWE contracts.

On March 15, he defeated The Lynch Mob (Ryan Lynch & Lucha Reigns) in a Handicap match and, the next night, he made his last appearance with Impact Zone Wrestling losing to The Honky Tonk Man being pinned after the Shake, Rattle and Roll.

=== Deep South Wrestling ===
Groothuis was assigned to its developmental territory Deep South Wrestling and, on September 1, he appeared on the promotion's debut show defeating "Irish" Ryan O'Reilly. Angel Williams was his valet during their match, however she did not appear with Bull in later matches.

Several days later, he and Ryan "Silverback" Reeves lost to The Regulators and, on September 15, he lost to Freakin Deacon. He soon began picking up a string of victories during the next weeks with victories over Eric Alexander, Vik Delicious and, accompanied by Daisy Mae, Ryan O'Reilly. On October 20, he wrestled two matches in one night defeating Palmer Cannon and Freakin Deacon by disqualification. In less than 30 seconds into the match, Freakin Deacon attacked Groothuis causing Cannon's disqualification. Both Freakin Deacon and Cannon continued attacking Groothuis, including whipping him into the ring steps, until Nick Patrick arrived to break it up. When Groothuis faced Freakin Deacon later that night, his head was bandaged. During the match, Freakin Deacon was disqualified after assaulting the referee however he continued to further injure Groothuis until Mac Johnson and High Impact (Tony Santorelli & Mike Taylor) ran into the ring on his behalf. This was his last DSW appearance before being assigned to Ohio Valley Wrestling in December.

=== Ohio Valley Wrestling ===
In his OVW debut, Groothuis lost to CM Punk on December 3 and, a week later, he and Kasey James lost to The Riggs Brothers at a house show. Four days later, he appeared in a dark match losing to Deuce Shade. On January 21, 2006, a match between him and Roadkill ended in a double disqualification. Although defeating him the following night, Groothuis would lose matches to Chet The Jet, Elijah Burke and Roadkill during the next two months.

On March 11, Groothuis defeated Pat Buck, Discord, Chuck Evans, Luis Almodovar and Mikey Batts in a six-way match. Following this victory, he became a villain with an evangelist in-ring persona and sang "Amazing Grace" before matches. He would lose matches to Chet The Jet and, in a tag team match, he and Vic Devine lost to Ryan Reeves and Mikey Batts three days later. He also lost to The Miz on March 26.

On April 15, under the name Generic Bay Bland, he lost to Jason Riggs and, almost a week later, he and Pat Buck lost The Riggs Brothers. On May 3, he lost a no disqualification match to OVW Television Champion Seth Skyfire. During the match, The Miz and his former valet Roni Jonah began taunting Skyfire. Skyfire then left then ring and began fighting with The Miz outside the ring. The referee began counting out Skyfire, but was stopped by Groothuis who challenged him to a no disqualification match. Returning to the ring, Skyfire agreed and called for the bell then pinned him with a rollup seconds later.

Although losing to Cody Runnels and Elijah Burke on June 3, he won a battle royal to become the number one contender to the OVW Heavyweight Championship two days later. He and Deuce n' Domino also defeated Runnels, Burke and Mikey Batts in a 6-man tag team match on June 8. During the next two days, he and Burke traded victories against one another. At the July 16th OVW Six Flags show, he teamed with Rahim, Pat Buck and Deuce n' Domino in a 10-man match losing to Roadkill, KC James, Cody Runnels and Mo and Chet the Jet at Six Flags Kentucky Kingdom. He and Pat Buck lost to Roadkill and Kasey James on June 17 and, four days later, he lost to Seth Skyfire in a rematch for the OVW Television title. At the OVW Six Flags show on June 30, he faced The Highlanders (Rory and Robbie McAllistair).

In early-July, Groothuis began a storyline involving his alcoholism. On July 7, he missed his scheduled match and later showed up at the event intoxicated alongside ODB. Winning a Gauntlet match to earn a title shot for the OVW Heavyweight title on June 15, he defeated Lennox Lightfoot in a dark match that same week. On July 21, he passed out in the corner during a match. The following night, he teamed with Cody Runnels and Discord to beat Rod Steele, Jon Bolen and Andy Vein. On July 27, he also teamed with Runnels and Shawn Osborne to defeat Aaron Stevens, Kasey James and Mike Mondo. The next night at OVW Six Flags show, he won a Rumble match.

On August 2, he defeated Johnny Punch in a dark match. Later that week, he teamed with Cody Runnels and Shawn Spears to beat Vic DeVine, John Bolen and Steele and won a battle royal at the OVW Six Flags show. Among the participants included John Bolen, Pat Buck, Elijah Burke, Eddie Craven III, Mike Kruel, Lennox Lightfoot, Ranger Milton, Shawn Osborne, Johnny Punch, Seth Skyfire, Rod Steele, Shad Gaspard, Neighborhoodie, Los Locos (Ramón and Raúl) and The Untouchables. Losing to CM Punk on August 16, he defeated Vic D. Vine in several matches later that month. On September 9, he defeated Shawn Osborne and, during the next few weeks, he began appearing with Sosay as his valet. The following month, he again defeated Vic D.Vine and The Bear, Raul of Los Locos dressed in a bear suit. He also defeated TJ Dalton by countout on November 1.

During the fall, Groothuis began feuding with Joey Mercury. Losing to Mercury on November 5, he challenged Mercury to a drinking contest which he won. He also beat him via disqualification in a mixed tag team match teaming with Katie Lea against Mercury and Beth Phoenix. On November 29, Groothuis attempted an escape artist stunt involving heavy chains. During the stunt, Mercury came out attacking his publicist Sosay and then hit Groothuis with a chair.

Mercury again attacked Groothuis after he had defeated Aaron Stevens at an OVW television taping several days later. However, he and Steve Lewington defeated Idol Stevens and Joey Mercury on December 9 and, with CM Punk, beat them in a rematch at an OVW television taping. On December 20, also defeated Joey Mercury in a Grudge match.

On January 3, 2007, he defeated The Original Sinn in a dark match and Daniel Rodimer three days later. On January 10, Groothuis appeared with Sosay to perform a "Feat of Strength" with help from Justin "The Ox" LaRoche and Charles "The Hammer" Evans. LaRoche and Evans turned on Groothuis however and continued attacking him until Idol Stevens intervened and ran them off.

On January 17, he and Atlas Debone (with Sosay) lost to Charles Evans & Justin LaRoche at an OVW television taping. Three days later, Groothuis was one of many wrestlers including Seth Skyfire, Thomas Farra, Tracy Taylor, Mike Taylor and Tony Salantri who were released from developmental contracts as part of a general cost-saving measure.

=== Return to the independent circuit ===
Returning to the independent circuit, Groothuis lost to Tank Toland at a Hoosier Pro Wrestling event in Columbus, Indiana on March 3. A month later, he made a surprise appearance at an IZW show interfering in a match against "Hawaiian Lion" John Williams and Jon VonCross. As a result, Williams won via disqualification. Siding with VonCross in his ongoing feud with Williams, Groothuis was in his corner when he faced Williams for the IZW Heavyweight title on May 8. On May 22, Groothuis defeated Mike G. in Tempe, Arizona. He also made a brief return to OVW appearing at an OVW television taping on June 13 and, two days later, defeating Nickolas Sinn at the OVW Six Flags show. On July 2, Groothuis took on Williams himself but failed to unseat the champion.

On January 2, 2008, Groothuis was scheduled to perform a stunt during an interpromotional supercard between IZW and NWA Arizona, the latter promotion closing and merging with IZW. Held at the Broadway Recreation Center in Mesa, Arizona, he was stopped by IZW Board of Directors' representative Strangler Steve King and then attacked by "The Limited Edition" Tommy Drake. Feuding with Tommy Drake during the next weeks, he defeated Drake on January 29. He and Lil' Nate also defeated Drake & Sexy Sonny Samson in a tag team match on February 12.

On July 1, at an interpromotional event between IZW and NWA Pro, he pinned Dean Radford at The Sets in Tempe, Arizona. He also appeared in the corner of "Wolf" Hollywood Yates in his match against The Great Ryan Lynch, accompanied by Steve King, on July 17. On August 12, he and Steve King defeated Tyson Tyler and Tommy Drake.

== Championships and accomplishments ==
- Impact Zone Wrestling

- IZW Heavyweight Championship (1 time)
- IZW Tag Team Championship (1 time) – with Chris Kole

- Pro Wrestling Illustrated

- PWI ranked him #384 of the 500 best singles wrestlers of the PWI 500 in 2006
