= Micah Taylor =

American professional wrestler

Personal information
- Born: Michael Sharrer; May 21, 1977 Kaneohe, Hawaii, U.S.
- Died: September 12, 2024 (aged 47)

Professional wrestling career
- Ring name(s): Micah Taylor; Mike Taylor; Sandy Beach
- Billed height: 5 ft 10 in (1.78 m)
- Billed weight: 242 lb (110 kg)
- Trained by: Rip Rogers; Lance Storm
- Debut: 2003
- Retired: 2022

Mike Sharrer (May 21, 1977 – September 12, 2024) was an American professional wrestler best known for his appearances with Ohio Valley Wrestling, Deep South Wrestling and WWE. Later in his career, he worked in Japan and the independent circuit in the United States.

== Professional wrestling career ==
Trained by Rip Rogers, Taylor began pro wrestling in 2003 for Ohio Valley Wrestling (OVW), a developmental territory of the WWE. He signed a contract with WWE. He teamed with Rob Begley losing to Paul London and Brian Kendrick on WWE Velocity on October 21, 2003. He continued teaming with Begley in OVW until 2004. In 2004, he briefly teamed with Steve Lewington.

Eventually assigned to WWE's Deep South Wrestling territory under the name Mike Taylor, he formed High Impact with Tony Santarelli and made their debut at Deep South Wrestling's first televised event, defeating The Regulators (Mike & Todd Shane) on September 1, 2005 although they lost to the Shane Twins in a rematch at a WWE live event three days later as well as to Team Elite on September 8.

Defeating Kid Kash and Johnny Parisi and the Slaughter Boys later that month, they also wrestled Team Elite to a 30-minute time limit draw on September 30. Facing Team Elite and The Regulators in several matches during October, Salantri also faced Mike Knox in a singles match losing to him on October 27. Defeating Nunzio and Big Vito on November 3 due to outside interference by The Regulators.

Within months of their debut, High Impact won the Tag Team titles in a championship tournament defeating Cocki Siaki & Bradley Jay, Team Elite and the Gymini in the tournament finals on May 18. During the next several months, he and Taylor would successfully defend the titles against The Bulldogs (Kid Kash & Jamie Noble) and Urban Assault. He, along with Mike and Tracy Taylor, appeared at Six Flags in a commercial for the supercard Park Slam on June 9. On October 5, 2006, lost the titles to the Untouchables. On October 19, 2006, he lost a singles title match to Bradley Jay. In their last appearance with the promotion, he and Taylor lost to WWE Tag Team Champions Gymini when Salantri was pinned by Jesse Gymini in January 2007.

Continuing to team with Salantri on the independent circuit, they would eventually return to the NWA wrestling in Georgia Championship Wrestling winning the GCW Tag Team Championship on April 18 before losing the titles on May 30.

After breaking up with Salantri, Taylor worked for Hawaii Championship Wrestling in the summer of 2007. He won the HCW Kamehameha Heritage Heavyweight Title in a tournament defeating Kaimana on September 9.

In December 2007, Taylor made his debut in Japan for Pro Wrestling Zero1 as Sandy Beach On February 2, 2008 Taylor defeated Yoshihito Sasaki for the ZERO1 United National Heavyweight Championship. He dropped the title back to Saski on March 29 and left Japan after the match.

In September 2009, Taylor was named one of the biggest stars on the Georga independent circuit by the Atlanta Examiner.

In May 2010, Taylor returned to Zero1 in Japan.

On December 11, 2011 he returned to Ohio Valley Wrestling for a one-night appearance when he lost to Vaughn Lilas.

Taylor continued working in the independent until his last match in 2022.

== Personal life ==
He was married to wrestler Tracy Taylor, and acted as Sharrer's valet during matches. The two also have a daughter, who also wrestles under the name Twisted Trixie.

== Death ==
Taylor died on September 9, 2024, at 47. Tributes on social media included Jax Dane, Bull James, Mike Mondo and his trainer Rip Rogers.

== Championships and accomplishments ==
- Deep South Wrestling
  - DSW Tag Team Championship (1 time) - with Tony Salantri
- Georgia Championship Wrestling / Great Championship Wrestling
  - GCW Heavyweight Championship (1 time)
  - GCW Tag Team Championship (1 time) - with Tony Salantri
- Global Championship Wrestling
  - GCW Heavyweight Championship (4 times)
- Hawaii Championship Wrestling
  - HCW Kamehameha Heritage World Heavyweight Championship (1 time)
- Lariato Pro Wrestling Guild
  - Lariato Pro Championship (1 time)
- North American Wrestling Alliance
  - NAWA Intercontinental Championship (1 time)
- NWA Hawaii
  - NWA Hawaii Hardcore Championship (2 times)
  - NWA Hawaii Tag Team Championship (1 time) - with KC Adams
- Pro Wrestling Illustrated
  - PWI ranked him #388 of the top 500 singles wrestlers in the PWI 500 in 2012
  - PWI ranked him #437 of the top 500 singles wrestlers in the PWI 500 in 2009
  - PWI ranked him #323 of the top 500 singles wrestlers in the PWI 500 in 2006
  - PWI ranked him #252 of the top 500 singles wrestlers in the PWI 500 in 2005
  - PWI ranked him #356 of the top 500 singles wrestlers in the PWI 500 in 2004
- Pro Wrestling Zero1
  - NWA United National Heavyweight Championship (1 time)
- Rampage Pro Wrestling
  - RPW Heavyweight Championship (4 times)
