= Major Players =

American professional wrestling tag team

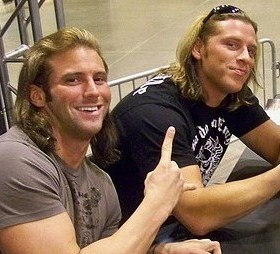
- Ryder (left) and Hawkins (right) at WrestleMania Axxess in 2009

Tag team
- Members: Curt Hawkins / Brian Major(s) / Brian Myers; Zack Ryder / Brett Major(s) / Brett Matthews / Matt Cardona
- Name(s): Brian Myers and Brett Matthews; Curt Hawkins and Zack Ryder; La Familia; Major Brothers; Major Players; Majors Brothers
- Billed heights: Curt Hawkins: 6 ft 1 in (1.85 m); Zack Ryder: 6 ft 2 in (1.88 m)
- Combined billed weight: 447 lb (203 kg)
- Billed from: Long Island, New York
- Former members: Chelsea Green
- Debut: August 2004
- Years active: 2004–2009; 2019–2020; 2022–2023
- Trained by: Mikey Whipwreck; Deep South Wrestling

The Major Players were a professional wrestling tag team consisting of Brian Myers and Matt Cardona. They are best known for their time in WWE as Curt Hawkins and Zack Ryder, where they are former two-time WWE Raw Tag Team Champions. Myers and Cardona also wrestled for Impact Wrestling, in which they are both former Impact Digital Media Champion.

The duo made their professional wrestling debut in 2004 as a tag team in New York Wrestling Connection, wrestling as Brian Myers and Brett Matthews. After the team signed with WWE, they would become almost exclusively tag team wrestlers. They debuted in WWE's main roster in 2007 on the ECW brand as Brian and Brett Major, collectively known as The Major Brothers. Later that year, they were repackaged and renamed to Curt Hawkins and Zack Ryder as associates of Edge and subsequently aligned themselves with La Familia on the SmackDown brand. Nicknamed "The Rated-R Entourage" and "The Edgeheads", Hawkins and Ryder continued their alliance with Edge until the team split in April 2009, after Ryder was drafted back to the ECW brand as part of the 2009 WWE draft. After the team's split, Hawkins and Ryder sporadically teamed together in matches, but would not officially reunite until almost 10 years later in January 2019. They would go on to capture the WWE Raw Tag Team Championships at WrestleMania 35 in April 2019. The team's second run in WWE would end in April 2020 when both Hawkins and Ryder were simultaneously released.

== History ==
=== New York Wrestling Connection (2004–2006) ===
The two debuted as a team in New York Wrestling Connection (NYWC) in 2004 with Matthew Cardona using the name Brett Matthews and Brian Myers using his real name. On May 21, 2005, they defeated the NYWC Tag Team Champions Dickie Rodz and Mason Raige by disqualification. At the next event on June 4, they won a rematch decisively to become Tag Team Champions. Later that month they were attacked by The Dead Presidents (Lo Lincoln and Boog Washington). Though they initially defended their titles against them in July, on August 27. On September 23 they were entered into a three-way match with the champions but Team Tremendous (Dan Barry and Ken Scampi) ended up with the belts. After continuing to win matches they re-earned a match against the champions and won the titles for the second time on January 25, 2006. They held the titles until they faced The B.S. Xpress (Tony Burma & Mike Spinelli), who defeated them for the gold on March 26.

=== World Wrestling Entertainment/WWE (2006-2020) ===
==== Developmental territories (2006–2007) ====
Matthews and Myers moved to Deep South Wrestling (DSW) in Georgia tweaking their ring names to Brett and Brian Majors, appearing collectively as The Majors Brothers. They lost their debut match on June 1 to Montel Vontavious Porter and Eric Pérez. They picked up their first wins on June 15 against Francisco Ciatso and Cru Jones but lost a Four Way title contendership match in July to Urban Assault (Peréz and Sonny Siaki). They continued to feud with Ciatso who changed partners frequently but never defeated The Majors Brothers. After a six match winning streak they were given a match against The Untouchables (Dice Domino and Deuce Shade) who were reigning as DSW Tag Team Champions. On 12 October, The Majors Brothers became the new champions after the match was restarted following a double pin situation.

As champions, the team became targets for aspiring champions and after their first title defence were attacked by Urban Assault. A scheduled match against them in November ended in double disqualification when The Gymini interfered in the match to attack both teams while a defence against The Gymini the following week saw another disqualification when Urban Assault made a return interference. The following week on November 30 The Majors Brothers lost their titles to Urban Assault. Their rematch went to a no contest when Urban Assault's manager G-Rilla began fighting with The Freakin' Deacon who was in The Majors' corner. After the DSW Tag Team Championship was vacated when the incumbents were released, The Majors were placed in a Three Way Tag Team match on January 19, 2007, for the titles, defeating The Samoan Fight Club (Afa Jr. and Siaki) and The Blue Bloods (William Regal and Dave Taylor) to become two-time champions. They held the championships briefly, losing them on 8 March to Team Elite (Derrick Neikirk and Mike Knox). The Majors stayed in DSW until April, exchanging victories with The Blue Bloods and teaming with Kofi Nahaje Kingston to defeat The Next Generation Hart Foundation (Harry Smith and TJ Wilson) and Shawn Osborne.

Brian Majors pre-empted the tag team's first appearance in Ohio Valley Wrestling (OVW) on April 25's TV tapings in a 15-minute time limit draw against Jay Bradley. As a team they debuted on May 9 to pick up a win against Los Locos (Ramon and Paul) with a slightly tweaked name of The Major Brothers. After defeating Gothic Mayhem (Johnny Punch and Pat Buck) in successive matches they went on to defeat the reigning OVW Southern Tag Team Champions "The Hammer" Charles Evans and "The Ox" Justin LaRouche (future La Familia stablemate Bam Neely) twice in non-title matches, once by disqualification. These series of victories led to them facing Evans and LaRouche, joined by Dr. Thomas in a three-on-two handicap tag match on June 15 and winning the OVW Tag Team Championship.

The former champions defeated them in a Four-Way Elimination Tag Team match the following week but a title match between the two of them on June 22 saw The Major Brothers retain. This was short lived though as they lost a non-title and subsequent title match to The James Boys (K.C. James and Kassidy James) on 29 June. Their rematch ended in a double countout and after this The Major Brothers won only by disqualification, by which titles cannot change hands, but ultimately lost a decisive rematch on July 13. In October they shared a rivalry with Paul Burchill, initially winning against him and Drew McIntyre and then again against Burchill and Stu Sanders and finally The Empire (Sanders and McIntyre). They continued to win in a Four Corners Tag Team match against Los Locos, The Empire and LaRouche with Andrew Vain. They took this momentum into a tournament for the Southern Tag Team Championship defeating Gothic Mayhem and Los Locos in successive rounds before finally being defeated by Burchill and Sanders, thus failing to recapture the titles.

==== Main roster debut and La Familia (2007–2009) ====
The Major Brothers made their WWE television debut on the May 1, 2007 episode of ECW on Sci Fi defeating Matt Striker and Marcus Cor Von in a tag team match. They were depicted as an unknown team and their initial victory was the only win the team had in ECW. Following their debut match, they lost to the team of Elijah Burke and Marcus Cor Von, as well as both losing singles matches to Burke and Striker. The Majors were drafted from ECW to SmackDown! on June 17, 2007, as the eighth pick in the 2007 Supplemental Draft. Vignettes aired hyping their impending debut on the brand. On their July 6, 2007 SmackDown! debut, the Majors defeated Jeremy Young and Mike Foxx. The following week, the Majors were victorious again, defeating the team of Chavo Guerrero Jr. and Jamie Noble. After a loss to Deuce 'n Domino on August 17, 2007, The Majors would not compete on the show again until October 12, 2007, when the debuting Drew McIntyre defeated Brett. The following week, McIntyre defeated Brian. On November 9, 2007, they received a tag title match after winning a number one contender's battle royal, but could not defeat the champions, Montel Vontavious Porter and Matt Hardy.

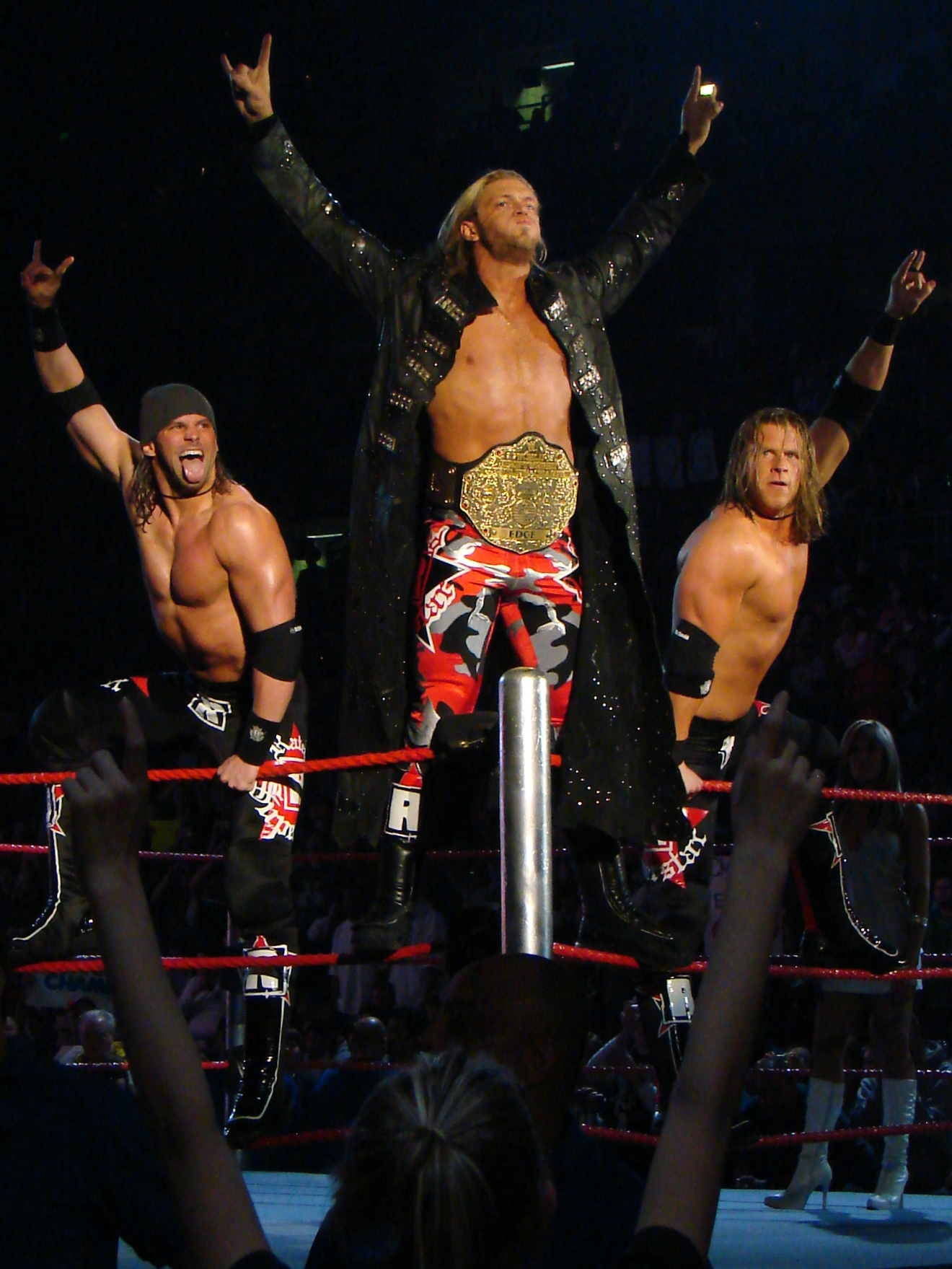
Hawkins and Ryder posing with Edge before the match

At Armageddon, the Major Brothers dressed as Edge and interfered in the World Heavyweight Championship match, taking bumps in Edge's place to help him win the title and thus turning heel for the first time in their WWE career. On December 21, 2007, the Major Brothers were revealed as an acquaintance to Edge and his lover, SmackDown General Manager Vickie Guerrero. The Major Brothers were repackaged and renamed, as Brett Major's name was changed to "Zack Ryder" and Brian Major to "Curt Hawkins". Occasionally teaming with their mentor Edge and/or their "La Familia" associate Chavo Guerrero on SmackDown, they even went on to be featured in the main event on multiple occasions. With this new gimmick, they were sometimes referred as "The Rated-R Entourage" by commentator Michael Cole. They also dropped the short trunks the team wore as the Major Brothers and started wearing long tights identical to Edge's tights. To differentiate between the two, Hawkins wore his hair in a ponytail. Later on, the team updated their attires, with Ryder debuting tights with new designs while Hawkins switched back to short trunks with new designs, and they began wearing sunglasses and a hoodie, respectively, to the ring.

At The Great American Bash on July 20, 2008, Hawkins and Ryder won the WWE Tag Team Championship from John Morrison and the Miz in a fatal four-way match which also featured Jesse and Festus and Finlay and Hornswoggle after Hawkins pinned Jesse. Their victory meant that they collectively became the youngest tag team champions in WWE history. At SummerSlam, La Familia seemed to have ended when a returning Undertaker sent Edge to Hell and then refused to forgive Vickie - prompting all the members to abandon Vickie, who would later align with Big Show. On the September 26, 2008 airing of SmackDown, Hawkins and Ryder lost the titles to Carlito and Primo Colón in their first televised title defense. On December 5, 2008, episode of SmackDown, they returned in a tag team gauntlet match against Jeff Hardy and Triple H where they were the first and only team eliminated. They also participated in the battle royal for the last spot in the SmackDown Elimination Chamber match, but were eliminated by The Great Khali. On April 15, 2009, Ryder was drafted back to the ECW brand as part of the 2009 Supplemental Draft, separating the team.

==== Sporadic reunions (2011, 2016, 2018) ====
Hawkins and Ryder had a brief reunion in 2011, when Hawkins helped Ryder defeat Vladimir Kozlov on the May 12 episode of Superstars. On the May 19 episode of Superstars, Hawkins teamed with Ryder in a losing effort against Kozlov and Santino Marella, but the tag team did not reform beyond this.

They also had a brief reunion in 2016 alongside former La Familia leader Edge, where they are seen talking backstage using the lyrics of Edge's entrance music "Metalingus", before Edge himself shows up, after the 900th episode of SmackDown Live went off the air. In 2018, Hawkins and Ryder became co-hosts of the WWE Network series "Zack and Curt Figure It Out". On the November 14, 2018 edition of WWE Main Event, Hawkins and Ryder teamed up for the first time since 2011 in a loss to Apollo Crews and Tyler Breeze.

==== Reformation (2019–2020) ====
Prior to the team's reformation, both Hawkins and Ryder were struggling as singles competitors; by the end of 2018, Hawkins had lost over 200 consecutive matches and Ryder had not appeared on WWE television in 2018 until the final Raw episode of the year. On the January 21, 2019 episode of Raw, Hawkins was attacked by The Revival. Ryder came to Hawkins' aid, foreshadowing a reunion. On the January 28 episode of Raw, Hawkins and Ryder made their official reunion facing The Revival in a losing effort after Hawkins was pinned by Dash Wilder. On April 5, WWE announced that Hawkins and Ryder would face The Revival at WrestleMania 35 for the Raw Tag Team Championship. At the event's Kickoff Show, the duo won the Raw Tag Team Championships, subsequently breaking Hawkins' 269-match losing streak. The following night on Raw, they successfully defended their titles in a rematch against The Revival, thus breaking Ryder's "WrestleMania curse" of losing a championship after winning it the night before at WrestleMania. At The Shield's Final Chapter, Hawkins and Ryder once again successfully defended the belts against The Revival and Aleister Black and Ricochet in a triple threat match. Following that, the team was largely absent from television mainly appearing on live events. Even though they were the champions, they only made two appearances on WWE programming during the month of May: a loss to The Viking Raiders (Erik and Ivar) on the May 6 episode of Raw and a win against Luke Gallows and Karl Anderson on the May 27 episode of Main Event. The duo returned during the 51-Man Battle Royal at the 2019 Super Showdown, but they were both eliminated during the match. On the following episode of Raw, Hawkins and Ryder lost the titles against The Revival in a triple threat match that also involved The Usos.

On April 15, 2020, Hawkins and Ryder were released from their WWE contracts as part of budget cuts due to the COVID-19 pandemic, ending their stint in WWE as a tag team.

=== Independent circuit (2022–2023) ===
At Game Changer Wrestling's Welcome to Heartbreak event in Los Angeles, Myers and Cardona reunited alongside Chelsea Green as "The Major Players," losing to X-Pac and Joey Janela in the main event.

=== Impact Wrestling (2022–2023) ===
On April 15, 2022 episode of Impact Wrestling, Myers, Cardona and Green attacked W. Morrissey during an in-ring promo, with Morrissey going through a table. Later in the show, Green gave Mickie James a cheap shot and then knocked her down with Myers and Cardona’s help.

== Other media ==
The Major Pod Network
- Major Wrestling Figure Podcast Logo
- Other name: The Major Wrestling Figure Podcast

YouTube information
- Channel: The Major Pod Network
- Years active: 2018–present
- Genre: Action figures
- Subscribers: 111 thousand
- Views: 18.7 million
- Last updated: October 24, 2024
- Website: majorwfpod.com

On August 23, 2018, Cardona and Myers started The Major Wrestling Figure Podcast. In the podcast, they talk about one of their favorite hobbies, collecting wrestling figures, and other topics relating to professional wrestling and action figures.

== Championships and accomplishments ==
- Game Changer Wrestling
  - GCW World Championship (1 time) – Cardona
- Absolute Intense Wrestling
  - AIW Absolute Championship (1 time) – Cardona
  - AIW Intense Championship (1 time) – Cardona
- DDT Pro Wrestling
  - DDT Universal Championship (1 time) – Cardona
- All Star Wrestling
  - ASW Heavyweight Championship (1 time) – Cardona
- Deep South Wrestling
  - DSW Tag Team Championship (2 times)
- Impact Wrestling
  - Impact Digital Media Championship (2 times) – Cardona (1), Myers (1)
  - Impact Knockouts World Tag Team Championship (1 time) – Green with Deonna Purrazzo
- National Wrestling Alliance
  - NWA Worlds Heavyweight Championship (1 time) – Cardona
- New York Wrestling Connection
  - NYWC Heavyweight Championship (1 time) – Cardona
  - NYWC Tag Team Championship (2 times)
- Ohio Valley Wrestling
  - OVW Southern Tag Team Championship (1 time)
- The Wrestling Showcase
  - Wrestling Showcase Championship (1 time, inaugural, current) – Cardona
  - Wrestling Showcase Title Tournament (2022)– Cardona
- Premier Wrestling Federation - New Jersey
  - PWF New Jersey Tag Team Championship (1 time)
- World Wrestling Entertainment/WWE
  - WWE (Raw) Tag Team Championship (2 times)
- Other titles
  - Internet Championship (3 times, inaugural, current) - Cardona
