= Groothuis =

Groothuis is a Dutch surname. Notable people with the surname include:

- Bart Groothuis (born 1981), Dutch politician
- Douglas Groothuis (born 1957), American Christian theologian
- Gregg Groothuis (born 1970), American professional wrestler
- Paul Groothuis, Dutch sound designer
- Stefan Groothuis (born 1981), Dutch speed skater
