= Shane Twins =

Professional wrestling tag team

Tag team
- Members: Mike Shane; Todd Shane
- Name(s): The Gymini; The Johnsons; Phi De Kappa U Shane Twins; The Regulators; Wentworth Twins
- Billed heights: 6 ft 4 in (1.93 m) - Mike; 6 ft 4 in (1.93 m) - Todd
- Combined billed weight: 304 lb (138 kg) each
- Debut: 1998
- Disbanded: 2018
- Trained by: Dean Malenko; Jeff Bradley

The Shane Twins (born December 21, 1967) are a professional wrestling tag team who consist of twin brothers Mike and Todd Shane. They were best known for their appearances in World Wrestling Entertainment (WWE) as the Gymini.

== History ==
=== Early career (1998–2002) ===
After being trained at the Malenko School of Wrestling in Tampa, Florida, The Shane Twins debuted in the Florida based IPW Hardcore Wrestling. They were originally known as "Biff Wentworth" (Mike) and "Chaz Wentworth" (Todd), collectively known as "The Wentworth Twins" or as "Phi De Kappa U". The Shane Twins held the IPW Tag Team Championship five times between 1998 and 2003. Their fifth reign began when they defeated The Road Warriors in Hokkaidō, Japan on a World Japan show. They also took on the Warriors, as well as feuded with The Nasty Boys, in the short-lived X Wrestling Federation in November 2001.

As Phi Dekappa U, they wrestled The Pitbulls in the main event of the Break the Barrier supershow at the ECW Arena in Philadelphia, Pennsylvania on May 15, 1999. Also in 1999, the Shane Brothers traveled to New Jersey to work with Tommy Fierro's ISPW in matches with the Misfits and The Stormtroopers. In 2000, they worked in Combat Zone Wrestling (CZW) with the Haas Brothers.

On January 13, 2001, Mike defeated The Dog to become the first IPW Hardcore Wrestling TV Champion. Todd, meanwhile, was out with an injury. On July 10, 2001, the Shane Twins won the vacant NWA Florida Tag Team Championship to become the Florida Unified Tag Team Champions (IPW Hardcore/NWA Florida) beating The New Heavenly Bodies and The Market Crashers in a Triple Threat match. On May 3, 2002, the Shane Twins won the JAPW Tag Team Championship after defeating Da Hit Squad at IPW WrestlePlex. They were stripped of the title on July 13.

=== TNA (2002) ===
On June 8, 2002, The Shane Twins won the NWA World Tag Team Championship from Chris Nelson and Vito DeNucci in Lima, Peru. The twins appeared on the first Total Nonstop Action Wrestling (TNA) pay-per-view on June 19 under the ring names "Richard "Dick" Johnson" (Mike) and "Rod Johnson" (Todd), known collectively as "The Johnsons". The Johnsons were managed by Mortimer Plumtree until they left TNA after several weeks. The Shane Twins were then stripped of the NWA Tag Team Championships, as TNA had gained exclusive rights to that title on June 28, 2002.

=== Independent circuit (2002-2005) ===
On March 20, 2004, Todd defeated Steve Madison for the NWA Florida Heavyweight Championship, which he lost back to Madison on September 4, 2004. They then began working for NWA Florida, where they formed a stable with Steve Madison and Rod Steel known as "911 Incorporated." They won the NWA Florida Tag Team Championships on four occasions. In July 2008, The Shane Twins returned to the World Wrestling Council in Puerto Rico for promoter Carlos Colon.

=== World Wrestling Entertainment (2005–2007) ===
In January 2005 the Shane Twins were signed to three year developmental contracts by World Wrestling Entertainment (WWE). On February 7, 2005, they were sent to developmental territory Ohio Valley Wrestling (OVW).They were later transferred to Deep South Wrestling (DSW), where they debuted under the name of "The Regulators". They immediately began a rivalry against High Impact (Tony Santorelli and Mike Taylor), as well as Ryan Reeves.

On January 6, 2006, The Regulators debuted on SmackDown! as the proteges of Simon Dean, under a new team name of the "Gymini". (The name was a play on both Simon Dean's gimmick - that of a nutrition supplement pitchman - and the mythological Gemini twins.) They were introduced to destroy Paul London and Brian Kendrick to the delight of Dean, and soon they became his henchmen under the pretext of being satisfied consumers of his nutrition system. The Gymini also frequently wrestled on WWE web show, Velocity, usually against jobbers. During the April 14, 2006 episode of SmackDown!, their full ring names were revealed as "Jake" (Mike) and "Jesse" (Todd). Under the management of Dean, Gymini continued to dominate SmackDown!'s other tag teams before Jesse became injured.

After Todd recovered, the Gymini made appearances in the WWE developmental promotion DSW. They entered a feud with commentator Bill DeMott after attacking him and smashing a computer over his head. DeMott allied himself with Freakin' Deacon to get revenge on the Gymini, but they defeated them in a no-DQ match when Deacon abandoned DeMott. In May, the Gymini challenged for the DSW Tag Team Championship, but they lost to High Impact.

At the end of October 2006, although the team appeared in various dark matches before SmackDown! events. The Gymini feuded with The Major Brothers for the DSW Tag Team Championship and introduced their new valet Angel Williams.

However, when Urban Assault (Sonny Siaki, Eric Perez and G-Rilla) captured the titles, the Gymini began to feud with them. On December 14, 2006, the Gymini captured the DSW Tag Team titles when Bill DeMott, burying his enmity with them, intervened in their match to attack G-Rilla, distracting Urban Assault enough to be defeated. DeMott became their manager and eventually replaced Williams. They wrestled a rematch against Urban Assault, who had turned on G-Rilla due to their loss and replaced him with Afa Jr., but the Gymini won again when the former Urban Assault member attacked them.

At the beginning of January 2007, the team returned to various dark matches before SmackDown! events. Then on January 18, 2007, WWE announced that they had released the twins.

=== Late career (2007–2009, 2012, 2018) ===
After WWE, they returned to the independent circuit and worked in Puerto Rico in 2008. They retired in 2009.

In 2012, they came out of retirement for only one night at IPW Hardcore Resurrection in St. Petersburg, Florida where they defeated Wayne Van Dyke and Shooter Storm.

Then in 2018, they returned to IPW in Port Richey, Florida where they lost to Odinson and Parrow.

== Championships and accomplishments ==
- Championship Wrestling from Florida
  - NWA Florida Heavyweight Championship (1 time) – Todd
  - NWA Florida Tag Team Championship (4 times)
- Deep South Wrestling
  - Deep South Tag Team Championship (1 time)
- Independent Pro Wrestling (Florida)
  - IPW Tag Team Championship (5 times)
  - IPW Television Championship (1 time) – Mike
- Jersey All Pro Wrestling

- JAPW Tag Team Championship (1 time)

- National Wrestling Alliance
  - NWA World Tag Team Championship (1 time)
- World Professional Wrestling Federation
  - WPWF Tag Team Championship (1 time)
- Wrestling Observer Newsletter
  - Worst Gimmick (2002) as The Johnsons
