= Cliff Compton =

American professional wrestler (born 1979)

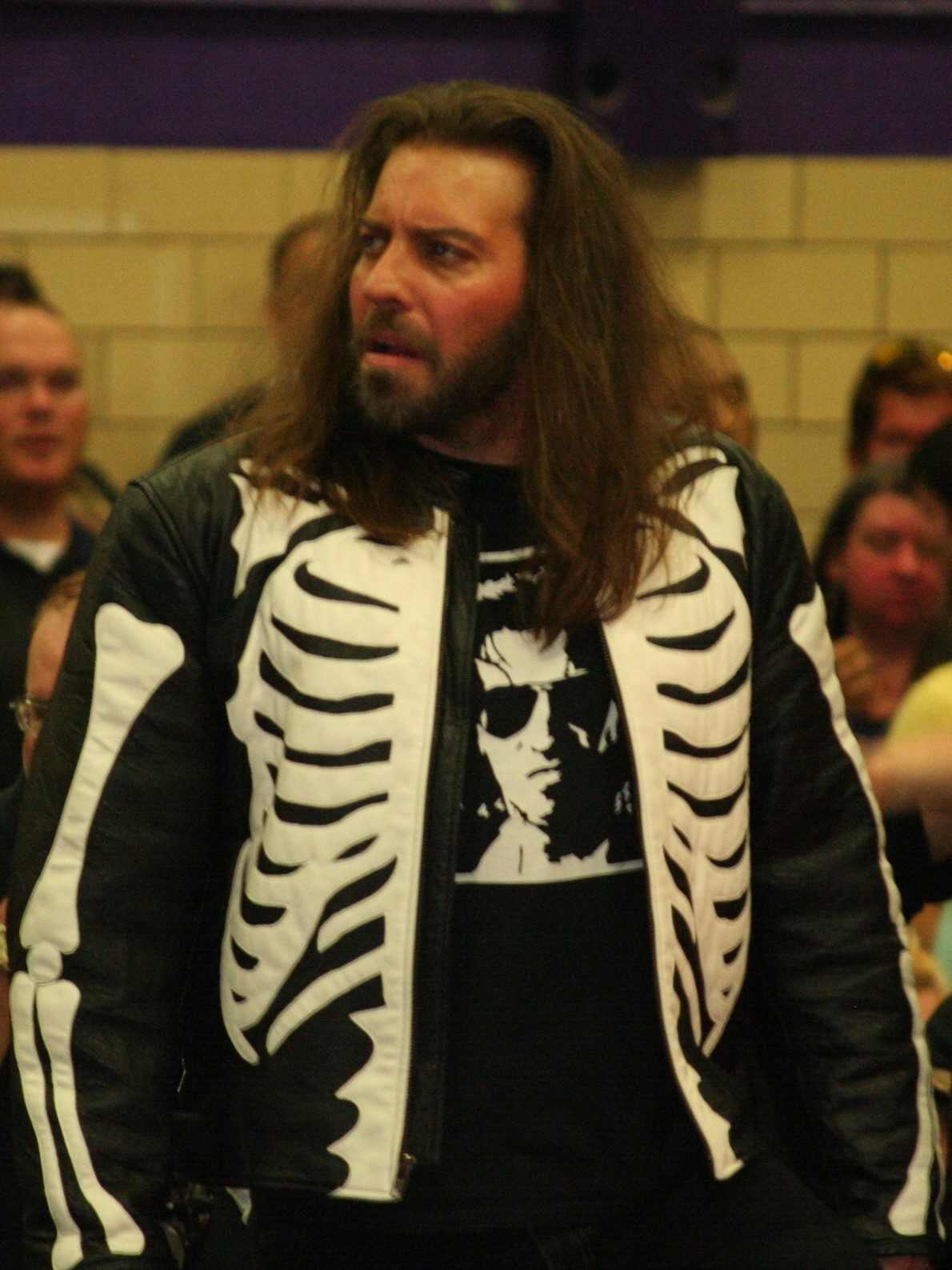
- Compton in 2012

Personal information
- Born: Cliff Treiber; November 2, 1979 (age 46) Nassau County, New York, U.S.

Professional wrestling career
- Ring name(s): Cliff Compton; Dice Domino; Domino; Super Domino
- Billed height: 6 ft 2 in (1.88 m)
- Billed weight: 220 lb (100 kg; 16 st)
- Billed from: "The Other Side of the Tracks"; New York City
- Trained by: Larry Sharpe; Ohio Valley Wrestling
- Debut: 1998

Cliff Treiber (born November 2, 1979) is an American professional wrestler, better known by his ring names Domino and Cliff Compton. He is best known for his work in World Wrestling Entertainment (WWE).

Before being promoted to the main WWE roster, Compton was assigned to WWE's developmental territory Ohio Valley Wrestling (OVW) in Louisville, Kentucky in 2005. While situated at OVW, he wrestled under the name Dice Domino and was placed in tag team competition, alongside Deuce Shade. Together, the pair won the OVW Southern Tag Team Championship on three occasions. It was also during this time that he and Deuce, alongside their manager Cherry, were known as "The Throw-Backs" and later as "The Untouchables".

The team's name was changed to Deuce 'n Domino for their main roster debut in January 2007, as part of the SmackDown! brand. Three months later, Deuce 'n Domino went on to win the WWE Tag Team Championship. The team lost the title in August 2007. The group disbanded in June 2008, after a series of losses. After the split, Compton played an enhancement talent on SmackDown!. Following his release from WWE in August 2008, he resumed wrestling on the independent circuit.

== Professional wrestling career ==
=== Early career (1998–2003) ===
Compton began his professional wrestling career after being trained in Larry Sharpe's Monster Factory. Compton became a regular for World Xtreme Wrestling, where he formed a tag team with Jake Bishop, known as Double Threat. On July 11, 2003, the duo won the WXW Tag Team Championship. He also wrestled a dark match for Total Nonstop Action Wrestling. In 2004 he was inactive from wrestling.

=== World Wrestling Entertainment (2005–2008, 2010) ===
==== Ohio Valley Wrestling (2005–2007) ====
On September 26, 2005, Compton was defeated by Danny Basham in a dark match prior to WWE Raw and was soon signed by World Wrestling Entertainment (WWE). Upon signing with WWE, Compton was sent to the Ohio Valley Wrestling (OVW) developmental territory. After four months at OVW, Compton began working as "Dice Domino", teaming with Deuce Shade under the management of his storyline sister Cherry Pie, using a 1950s greaser in-ring persona, forming the faction "The Throw-Backs".

During their time together they underwent an image change, including changing the group's name to "The Untouchables" and dropping Dice, Shade, and Pie from their respective names. On March 19, the team would become OVW Southern Tag Team Champions after Deuce defeated The Miz in a singles match after Miz's partner, Chris Cage, left the organization and forced The Miz to defend the title on his own. The Untouchables lost their titles on April 5, in a three-way match to Roadkill and Kasey James, which also involved Kenny and Mikey of The Spirit Squad. The group soon began a scripted rivalry with the team of CM Punk and Seth Skyfire before later engaging into a long and heated rivalry with Shawn Spears and Cody Runnels, which even saw Cherry leave The Untouchables to side with Spears and Runnels briefly before betraying them. The feud culminated in a street fight between the two teams, with Spears and Runnels winning the match.

The Untouchables won the OVW Tag Team Title another two times, as well as the DSW Tag Team Championship once in October 2006, before being called up to the main WWE roster in January 2007.

==== SmackDown! (2007–2008) ====
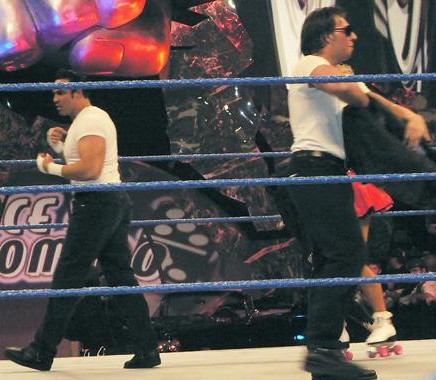
Domino (right) with Deuce before a match on a SmackDown! taping

In their first match with WWE, where they debuted on the SmackDown! brand, the team's name was changed again, this time to "Deuce 'n Domino". They debuted on the January 19, 2007, episode, where they were placed in a tag team match, in which Deuce 'n Domino won. On the February 2 episode of SmackDown!, the team defeated the then-WWE Tag Team Champions Paul London and Brian Kendrick in a non-title match. Deuce 'n Domino faced London and Kendrick in a WWE Tag Team Championship match at February's pay-per-view event, No Way Out. At the event, they lost when Kendrick pinned Deuce via a roll-up. On the April 20 episode of SmackDown!, they defeated London and Kendrick for the WWE Tag Team Championship when London was, in storyline, injured after missing a moonsault to the outside. Kendrick was left to defend the title by himself, and was pinned after being hit with the West Side Stomp, a finishing move performed by Deuce 'n Domino. Three weeks later, London and Kendrick competed against William Regal and Dave Taylor. Deuce 'n Domino interfered, causing Regal and Taylor to be disqualified. This made both teams number one contenders leading to a triple threat tag team match the following week where Deuce 'n Domino retained the tag title.

During a tag team match with Cryme Tyme (Shad Gaspard and Jayson Paul) in late June, Domino suffered an injury, which was diagnosed as a broken nose and a possible broken orbital bone socket in his eye. The injury kept him out of the ring for a month. After coming back from his injury, Deuce 'n Domino engaged in short rivalries with Batista and Ric Flair. On the August 31 episode of SmackDown!, he and Deuce lost their tag team championship to Matt Hardy and the reigning United States Champion Montel Vontavious Porter. During the last few months of 2007, Deuce 'n Domino had short rivalries with Hardy and MVP, Jimmy Wang Yang and Shannon Moore, Jesse and Festus, and Finlay and Hornswoggle.

At the beginning of 2008, the team suffered a series of losses. At WrestleMania XXIV in March, Deuce 'n Domino competed as singles competitors in a 24-man Interpromotional Battle Royal, in which the winner would face then ECW Champion Chavo Guerrero Jr. later that night; however, neither was able to win the match. On the May 23 episode of SmackDown, Deuce 'n Domino parted ways with Cherry; WWE Diva Maryse would take over as the team's on-screen manager.

On the June 20, 2008, episode of SmackDown, following a loss to Jesse and Festus, their second straight loss in two weeks, Deuce 'n Domino fought after the match, ending with Deuce laying out Domino with the Crack 'em in da Mouth. Deuce then threw his jacket over Domino, dissolving their partnership. The split was then further cemented when Deuce was drafted to the Raw brand as part of the 2008 WWE Supplemental Draft. Following the draft, Domino was predominantly featured as an enhancement talent on SmackDown weekly.

Domino's last television appearance was on the August 1 episode of SmackDown, when he suffered a loss to The Big Show. He was then released from his WWE contract on August 8, 2008 and took a hiatus from wrestling afterwards.

==== Florida Championship Wrestling (2010) ====
In 2010, Compton returned to WWE and was sent to Florida Championship Wrestling where he wrestled under the name Cliff Compton. His first match came on February 18, where he took on the FCW Florida Heavyweight Champion Justin Gabriel but would lose via DQ. Later in the night, Compton and Wade Barrett lost to Gabriel and Michael Tarver. He would go on to have one more match before leaving WWE.

=== Return to OVW (2010–2014) ===
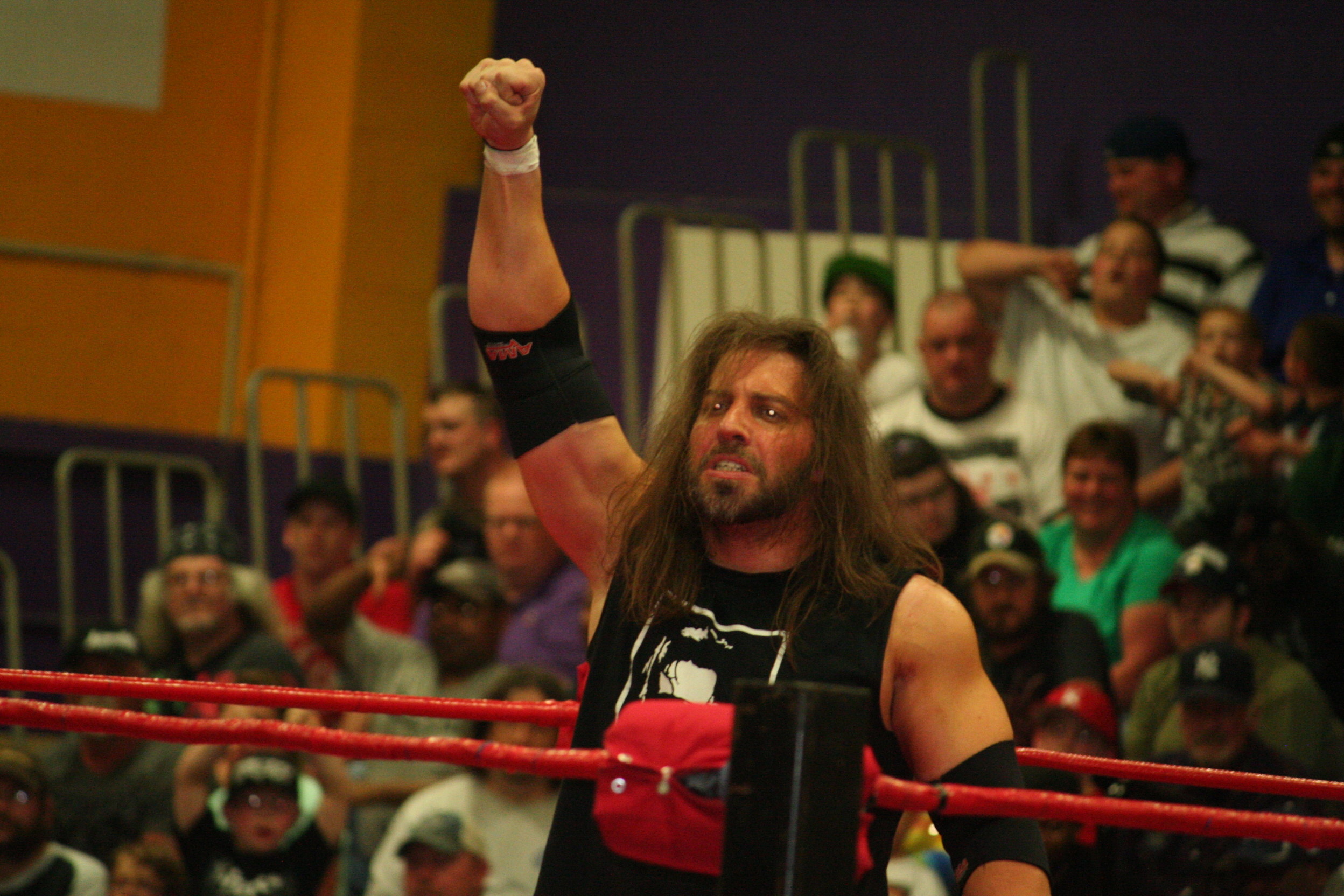
Compton at an independent event in 2012

Compton returned to Ohio Valley Wrestling in September 2010, using the ring name "Mr. Media" Cliff Compton. After a four-month undefeated streak, on January 8, 2011, Compton defeated then–champion "Low Rider" Matt Barela and Mike Mondo in a three-way match to win the OVW Heavyweight Championship for the first time. Two months later on March 5, the three faced off for the championship again, this time in a ladder match, which Mondo won. During the match, Compton suffered a broken ankle, torn ligaments, and a strained calf muscle. Compton regained the OVW Heavyweight Championship on May 14, when he defeated Mondo in a Brass Knuckles on a Pole match for the vacant championship. He lost the title to Elvis Pridemoore, following interference from Mondo, just eleven days later. On January 25, Compton's profile was removed from OVW's website, signalling his departure from the company.

On May 12, 2012, Compton returned to OVW in a dark match with Mike Mondo going up against Raphael Constantine and Sean Casey. On May 31, Compton wrestled a tryout dark match for Total Nonstop Action Wrestling (TNA), losing to Crimson. On October 17, Compton won the OVW Television Championship from Alex Silva. He held the championship for three weeks, before it was vacated due to Compton suffering an injury. Following his return from injury, he defeated Jamin Olivencia to regain the championship on January 5, 2013. Following a two-month reign, he lost the championship to Rockstar Spud on March 13. Compton returned to OVW again on September 3, 2014, declaring his intention to win the OVW Heavyweight Championship again. On October 4, Compton won his third OVW Heavyweight Championship after pinning Marcus Anthony in a three-way match, also involving champion Melvin Maximus. However, he lost the title two months later, while being injured, against Adam Revolver.

=== Ring of Honor (2013–2015) ===
On March 2, 2013, Compton made his debut for Ring of Honor (ROH) at their 11th Anniversary Show iPPV, where he, Jimmy Rave, Matt Hardy and Rhett Titus, revealed themselves as the newest members of S.C.U.M. by attacking numerous members of the ROH roster following the main event, joining Kevin Steen, Jimmy Jacobs, Rhino and Steve Corino as members of the group. After Steen lost the ROH World Championship, Compton and the rest of S.C.U.M turned on Steen and made Steve Corino the new leader. At Best in the World 2013, Compton and Rhett Titus lost a three-way tag team match for the ROH World Tag Team Championship. On June 23, S.C.U.M. was forced to disband after being defeated by Team ROH in a Steel Cage Warfare match. Compton returned to ROH in early 2014, feuding with Steen. Compton repeatedly attacked Steen on shows leading up to the 12th Anniversary Show. He lost to Steen in an Unsanctioned Street Fight at the 12th Anniversary Show, in which he suffered a concussion. In May, Compton and Steen found common enemies and defeated Eddie Kingston and Homicide in a Charm City Street Fight. Almost one year later, March 14, 2015, Compton returned to challenge Jay Lethal for a chance to earn a shot at the ROH World Television Championship on the spot. Lethal defeated Compton in a Chicago Street Match to retain the title.

In 2018, Compton announced his retirement from professional wrestling.

=== Return to independent circuit (2021–present) ===
Thirteen years after the separation, Treiber along with Reiher and Drew reformed the Deuce 'n Domino stable and began accepting bookings on the independent circuit.

== Other media ==
In March 2014, Compton and Colt Cabana appeared in a commercial for KFC. In April 2014, a documentary titled, The Wrestling Road Diaries Too featuring Compton, Colt Cabana and Drew Hankinson, was released on DVD. Cliff was the latest guest on The Kevin Steen Show, released in July 2014.

== Championships and accomplishments ==
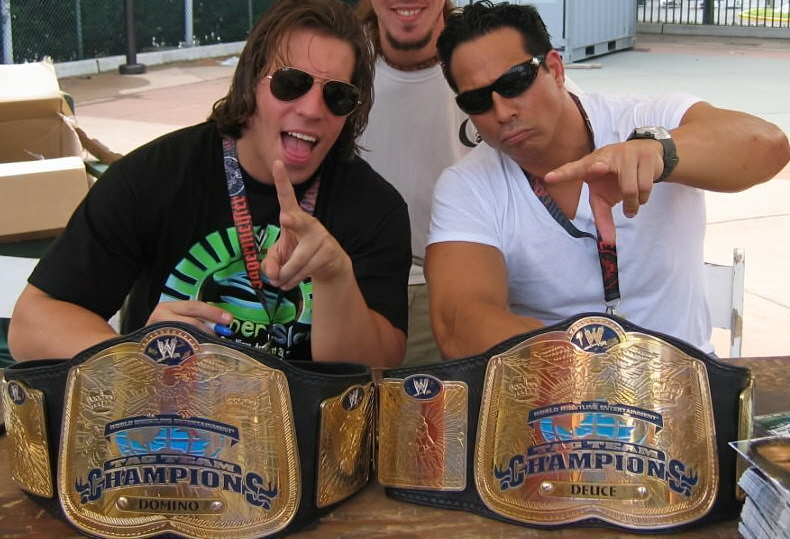
Domino is a former WWE Tag Team Champion with Deuce

- Deep South Wrestling
  - DSW Tag Team Championship (1 time) – with Deuce Shade
- NWA Southern All-Star Wrestling
  - NWA Southern Heavyweight Championship (1 time)
- Ohio Valley Wrestling
  - OVW Heavyweight Championship (3 times)
  - OVW Southern Tag Team Championship (3 times) – with Deuce Shade
  - OVW Television Championship (2 times)
  - Ninth OVW Triple Crown Champion
- Pro Wrestling Illustrated
  - Ranked No. 169 of the top 500 singles wrestlers in the PWI 500 in 2008
- World Wrestling Entertainment
  - WWE Tag Team Championship (1 time) – with Deuce
- World Xtreme Wrestling
  - WXW Tag Team Championship (1 time) – with Jake Bishop
