= Cryme Tyme =

Professional wrestling tag team

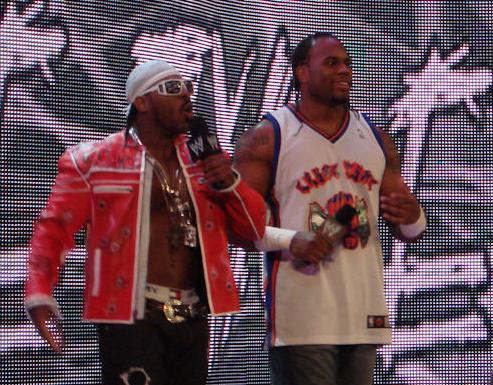
- JTG (left) and Shad Gaspard (right) in 2009

Tag team
- Name(s): Crime Time; Cryme Tyme; The Gang Stars; Shad Gaspard and The Neighborhoodie; Shad Gaspard & JTG
- Members: JTG/The Neighborhoodie; Shad Gaspard
- Manager: Eve Torres
- Billed heights: JTG: 6 ft 2 in (1.88 m); Shad Gaspard: 6 ft 7 in (2.01 m)
- Combined billed weight: 527 lb (239 kg)
- Billed from: Brooklyn, New York
- Former members: Slam Master J
- Debut: May 24, 2006
- Disbanded: May 17, 2020
- Years active: 2006–2010; 2014–2020
- Trained by: Ohio Valley Wrestling

Cryme Tyme was an American professional wrestling tag team consisting of JTG and Shad Gaspard, best known for their tenure in WWE.

The team was an over-the-top parody of stereotypical street thugs. The tag team first disbanded in 2010, though reunited in 2014 and continued wrestling until Gaspard's death in May 2020.

== History ==
=== Ohio Valley Wrestling (2006–2007) ===
Gaspard qualified for the finals of the reality television program Tough Enough 2 in 2002, but was disqualified and replaced after failing a physical. He was recruited by WWE talent scout Tom Prichard and trained with DeWayne Bruce for six months before debuting in Ohio Valley Wrestling (OVW) under the ring name Da Beast. He acted as part of the stable Bolin Services, acting as an enforcer.

JTG meanwhile had debuted as Just Too Good in OVW and after two matches, he was repackaged as The Neighborhoodie and subsequently placed into a tag team with Gaspard, who began performing under his real name. Collectively, their team was named "The Gang Stars". They won the OVW Southern Tag Team Championship by defeating Roadkill and Kasey James on May 24, 2006, in their first match as a team. After they won the championships, they entered into a feud with CM Punk who teamed up with Kane to defeat them and Simon Dean in a handicap match. Punk and Kane won a title match by disqualification, but they did not win the titles. They retained the titles in a gauntlet match, but later in the month lost the championships to Punk and Seth Skyfire on July 28. The following day, they lost a number one contendership match to The Untouchables (Dice Domino and Deuce Shade). The following year, the team returned to OVW, this time under the name "Cryme Tyme", and regained the OVW Southern Tag Team Championship on July 21 from The James Boys (KC James and Kassidy James). They lost the titles back to them the following day.

=== World Wrestling Entertainment (2006–2007) ===
In late 2006, WWE promoted The Gang Stars to the main Raw brand roster, starting by having them work live events and dark matches. On the September 4 episode of Raw, vignettes began airing to promote the debut of the team, now dubbed Cryme Tyme, showing them "training" for their pending debut on the show. Before the vignettes aired, WWE placed a statement on their website, WWE.com, stating:

Tonight a new tag team, Cryme Tyme, will be introduced to the Raw audience. In an effort to humor and entertain our fans the tag team known as Cryme Tyme will be parodying racial stereotypes.
Shad Gaspard and JTG do outlandish, outrageous "stunts" to ready themselves for tag team action on Raw. This attempt at Saturday Night Live like humor is bound to entertain audiences of all ethnic derivations.
We hope you enjoy the weekly adventures of Cryme Tyme.

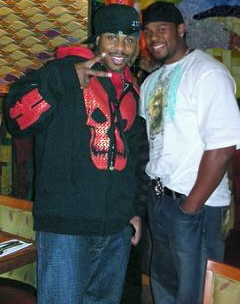
Cryme Tyme at an autograph signing in 2007

The vignettes, which aired weekly, featured Cryme Tyme robbing people while an announcer dubbed their actions "training exercises" designed to work on things like "speed", "agility", "drive", "endurance", and "intensity". Cryme Tyme wrestled as fan favorites at live events and in dark matches, finally making their television debut, defeating Johnny and Mikey of The Spirit Squad on the October 16 episode of Raw.

After arriving on Raw, they were depicted covertly stealing things—such as Jerry Lawler's laptop, and a plasma screen TV—during interviews and while celebrating wins with the announce team.

On November 5, the team made their pay-per-view debut at Cyber Sunday, defeating Lance Cade and Trevor Murdoch, The Highlanders (Rory and Robbie McAllister), and Charlie Haas and Viscera in a four team tornado tag team match. Later that same month, they were featured in a Raw segment that parodied Michael Richards's "Laugh Factory incident". In the skit, a wrestler (Nick Berk) — acting as a stand in for Richards — recreated the scene of the incident by using racial slurs and insults until Cryme Tyme confronted him on stage. Nervous, he offered an apology, but Gaspard kicked him in the head and JTG made a Seinfeld-esque joke by saying, "What's the deal with the Bloods and the Crips? Can't they all just get along?". This event was the beginning of a series of vignettes and skits featuring Cryme Tyme interacting with different, unexpected audiences.

Around the same time, they began a feud with The World's Greatest Tag Team (Shelton Benjamin and Charlie Haas), during which Benjamin began to express disgust with Cryme Tyme's antics, calling them offensive and harmful to the black community. During the storyline, Haas started "acting black", but after the World's Greatest Tag Team handed Cryme Tyme their first loss on the January 29, 2007, episode of Raw, the program was dropped, with Cryme Tyme appearing mainly on Raw's sister show Heat, only appearing on Raw in backstage segments.

After Mr. McMahon's "death", Cryme Tyme plugged some merchandise and auctions in memory of him. On the June 29, 2007 episode of SmackDown, Cryme Tyme was defeated by Deuce 'n Domino (with Cherry) in an inter-brand match tag team match. While Deuce, Domino and Cherry celebrated their victory, Cryme Tyme appeared on the titantron and, in storyline, stole their car, taking it to Brisco Brothers Auto to sell it for parts chanting their catchphrase, "Money money, yeah, yeah", which became their signature phrase.

On July 21, 2007, Cryme Tyme appeared at an OVW event and wrestled the OVW Southern Tag Team Champion The James Boys (K.C. and Kassidy James), winning the championship for the second time.

The duo returned to Raw in July with a new gimmick, which saw them taking items and auctioning them off to the crowd. This led to a feud with then World Tag Team Champions Lance Cade and Trevor Murdoch, but both JTG and Gaspard were released from their WWE contracts for undisclosed reasons on September 2, 2007, before the feud was resolved.

=== Independent circuit (2007–2008) ===
After leaving WWE, they continued teaming together on the professional wrestling independent circuit, using the alternate spelling "Crime Time". They appeared at Jersey All Pro Wrestling's (JAPW) 10th Anniversary Show, defeating the Dirty Rotten Scoundrelz. They left the promotion undefeated after defeating Style & Finesse (Mike Donovan and Rob Vegas) in January 2008's Reclaiming Hudson.

The duo also made several solo appearances on the solo circuit. Gaspard lost to Psicosis at a Pro Wrestling Alliance (PWA) event in September while his partner, appearing under the altered name Jay-TG made several appearances on the Derby City Wrestling (DCW) television programme.

=== Return to WWE (2008–2010) ===
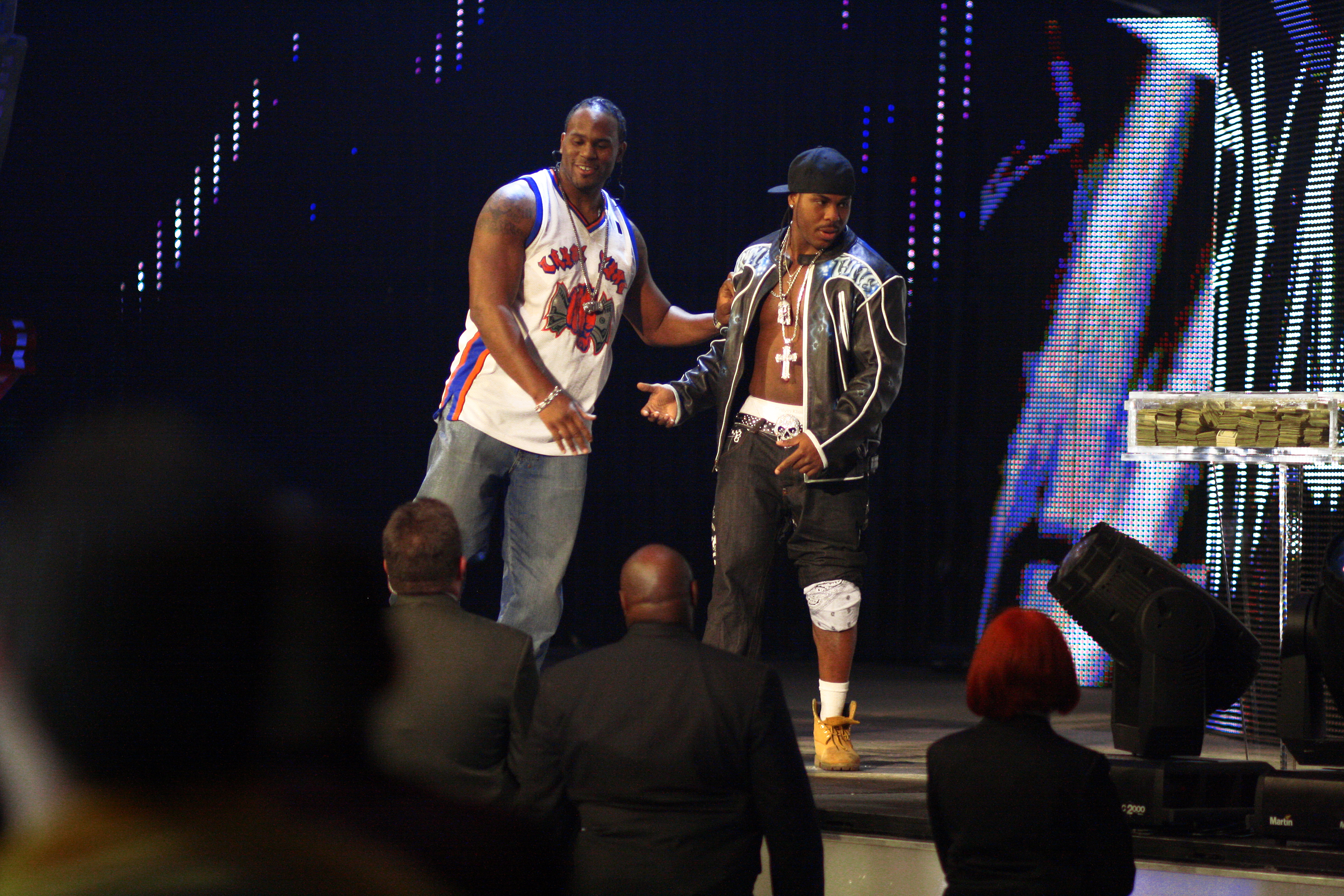
Cryme Tyme in 2008 during Raw, looking at Mr. McMahon's million dollars

JTG and Gaspard returned to WWE under the Cryme Tyme name on the March 31 episode of Raw in 2008, defeating Lance Cade and Trevor Murdoch. Cryme Tyme began working with John Cena on the June 30 episode of Raw when they helped him interfere during John "Bradshaw" Layfield's match. The following week on Raw, they again appeared together in a segment when they vandalized JBL's limo. After a live event match, Cena confirmed that they had created a faction and announced that it was called CTC or "Cryme Tyme Cenation". Separately, Cryme Tyme started a feud with then World Tag Team Champions Cody Rhodes and Ted DiBiase, stealing their championship belts for a time, then losing a title match to them at Unforgiven. The CTC quietly separated after Cena's injury.

On April 15, 2009, Cryme Tyme were drafted to the SmackDown brand as part of the 2009 supplemental draft. Eve Torres later became their valet, accompanying them to the ring and appearing in backstage segments with them. Later, Torres and Cryme Tyme got into a feud with The Hart Dynasty. They competed in six-person mixed tag team, singles and tag team matches. On the July 31 episode of SmackDown, they became the number one contenders to the Unified WWE Tag Team Championship by defeating The Hart Dynasty, but Cryme Tyme was defeated by then champions Jeri-Show (Chris Jericho and Big Show) at SummerSlam.

Cryme Tyme was supposed to compete for Team SmackDown at Bragging Rights. However, due to health concerns regarding Gaspard, Cryme Tyme (along with most of the SmackDown team) was replaced by Matt Hardy, R-Truth, The Hart Dynasty and Finlay. On the March 5 episode of SmackDown, they had a number one contenders match to fight The Miz and Big Show for the Unified WWE Tag Team Championships against John Morrison and R-Truth and The Hart Dynasty, but they failed to win the match. The following week on SmackDown, Cryme Tyme were facing The Hart Dynasty, but were attacked by The Undertaker while he was sending a direct message to Shawn Michaels for a match at WrestleMania XXVI.

At WrestleMania XXVI, both members of Cryme Tyme competed in the dark match battle royal, where JTG would be eliminated by Gaspard. Just days later on SmackDown, after a quick loss to John Morrison and R-Truth, Gaspard was enraged and attacked JTG for not coming to his rescue in the match, thus turning Gaspard heel. Backstage after the match during an interview, Gaspard told Josh Mathews, "No more Time... no more Cryme Tyme... This is my time". The next week on SmackDown, Gaspard came to the ring and announced that he was done with Cryme Tyme and announced again that it was his time. Afterwards, an enraged JTG came out ready to fight him, but got kicked in the face by Gaspard for his troubles. This would lead to a strap match at Extreme Rules, which was won by JTG. The two had a standard rematch on the May 6 episode of Superstars, which Shad won by pinfall, thus ending their feud. Gaspard was then sent to FCW developmental territory, while JTG stayed on the SmackDown brand. Gaspard was later released from his WWE contract on November 19, 2010, along with five other wrestlers.

=== After disbandment (2010–2014) ===
A few months after he was released from WWE, Shad signed with Japanese wrestling promotion IGF in February 2011. He was also focusing on his acting career. During this time, Shad occasionally wrestled in the independent circuit. In June 2012, Shad said their team was being copied by The Prime Time Players. JTG was released from WWE on June 12, 2014.

=== Return to the independent circuit; Gaspard's death and disbandment (2014–2020) ===
It was announced on June 19, 2014, that JTG and Gaspard were looking for booking interests labeled now as the slightly altered "Crime Time". On August 23, 2014, Crime Time and The Blue Meanie were defeated by Chachi, JGeorge and Mike Verna at WOW Under the Lights 3. At JAPW 18th Anniversary Show, Crime Time defeated Damien Darling and Danny Demento. On March 3, 2016, at XWA Xtreme Rumble, the duo were defeated by Colt Cabana and Dick Justice. Then on, March 31, 2017 the duo would lose to former WWE tag team The Headbangers (Mosh and Thrasher) at FEW Super Party in Orlando, Florida.

JTG and Gaspard continued to wrestle together on the independent circuit until Gaspard’s death from drowning on May 17, 2020. Their final match took place on February 15, 2020 at former WWE wrestler Santino Marella's Battle Arts promotion in Mississauga, Ontario, Canada. Gaspard was given the Warrior Award at the WWE Hall of Fame in 2022.

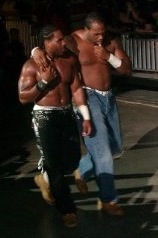
Cryme Tyme at a Puerto Rico house show

== Championships and accomplishments ==
- NWA Wildside
  - NWA Wildside Tag Team Championship (1 time)
- Adrenaline Championship Wrestling
  - ACW Tag Team Championship (1 time)
- Fighting Evolution Wrestling
  - FEW Tag Team Championship (1 time)
- Ohio Valley Wrestling
  - OVW Southern Tag Team Championship (2 times)
- Superstars of Wrestling Federation
  - SWF Tag Team Championship (1 time)
- VIP Wrestling
  - VIP Tag Team Championship (1 time)
- World Wrestling Alliance
  - WWA Tag Team Championship (1 time)
- SWF
  - Tag Team Championship (1 time)
- WWE
  - WWE Hall of Fame (Class of 2022 – Warrior Award) – Gaspard
