= Deuce 'n Domino =

Professional wrestling tag team

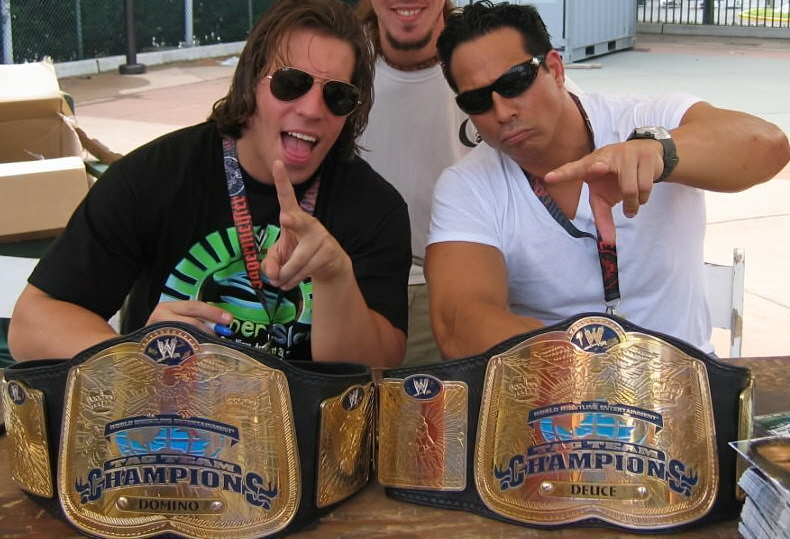
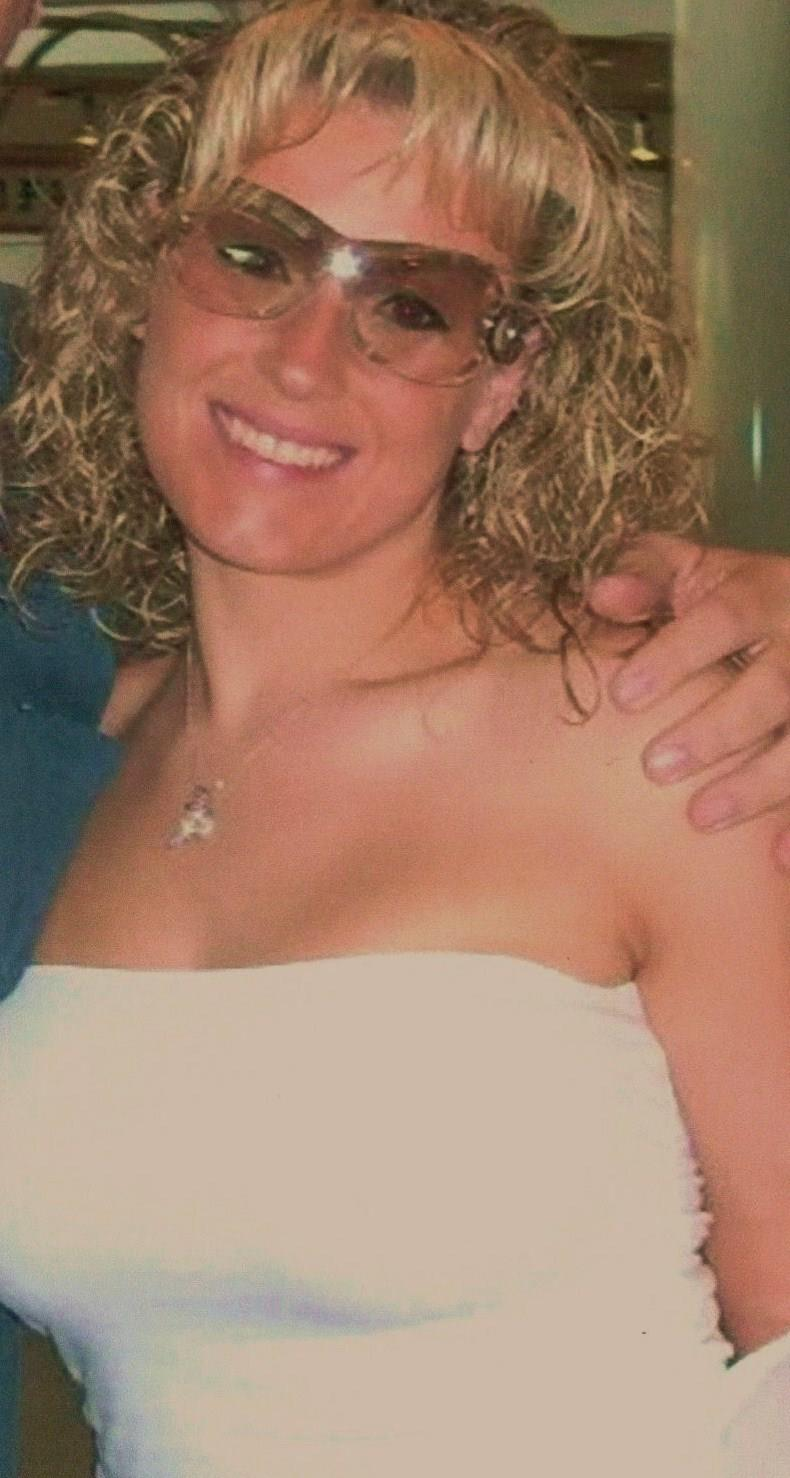
- 1st pic: Domino (left) & Deuce (right) as the WWE Tag Team Champions; 2nd pic: The teams first & original valet Cherry

Tag team
- Members: Deuce; Domino
- Name(s): Deuce 'n Domino; The Untouchables; The Throwbacks
- Billed heights: Deuce: 5 ft 11 in (1.80 m); Domino: 6 ft 2 in (1.88 m)
- Combined billed weight: 466 lb (211 kg)
- Billed from: The Other Side of the Tracks
- Former members: Cherry (valet); Maryse (valet)
- Debut: January 2006
- Years active: 2006–2008; 2021–present

Deuce 'n Domino is an American professional wrestling tag team consisting of Deuce Shade and Dice Domino, who were managed for the majority of their run by Cherry and briefly by Maryse. The pair teamed together in World Wrestling Entertainment (WWE) and Ohio Valley Wrestling (OVW) from 2006 through 2008, capturing the WWE Tag Team Championship on one occasion and the OVW Southern Tag Team Championship on three occasions. In addition, they also won the Deep South Wrestling Tag Team Championship on one occasion.

== History ==
=== World Wrestling Entertainment (2006–2008) ===
==== Ohio Valley Wrestling (2006–2007) ====
Before forming a team, both Deuce Shade and Dice Domino competed in singles competition, occasionally against each other, in World Wrestling Entertainment (WWE)'s developmental territory, Ohio Valley Wrestling (OVW). In January 2006, Deuce and Domino formed a partnership with Domino's storyline sister, Cherry Pie, as their manager. The trio adopted a 1950s greaser in-ring persona, to become known as "The Throwbacks".

During their time together they underwent an image change, including changing their name to "The Untouchables" and dropping Shade, Dice, and Pie from their respective names. The team would become OVW Southern Tag Team Champions after Deuce defeated The Miz on March 19, 2006, in a singles match after Miz's partner, Chris Cage, left the organization and forced The Miz to defend the title on his own. The team, however, lost the title the following month to Roadkill and Kasey James in a three-way match, which also involved Kenny and Mikey of The Spirit Squad.

The group soon began a scripted rivalry with the team of CM Punk and Seth Skyfire, which saw The Untouchables winning the Southern Tag Team Title from them on August 2, 2006. The Untouchables later engaged in another rivalry with Shawn Spears and Cody Runnels. They also won the Deep South Wrestling (DSW) Tag Team Championship after making a surprise appearance at a DSW show on October 5, 2006. They lost the South Tag Team Championship on October 12 to The Major Brothers. In addition, the team lost the OVW Southern Tag Team Title to Spears and Runnels, prompting Cherry to leave The Untouchables to side with Spears and Runnels briefly before betraying them. The team won the Southern Tag Team Championship on another occasion, before losing them to Spears and Rhodes in a street fight, thus ending their feud.

==== SmackDown! (2007–2008) ====
The team was called up to WWE's SmackDown! roster in January 2007, with the team undergoing a name change to "Deuce 'n Domino" with their manager, now simply called "Cherry". Despite the team name change, they retained their greaser personas, adding to their ring entrance an arrival in a 1950s era car. Deuce 'n Domino won their debut tag team match.

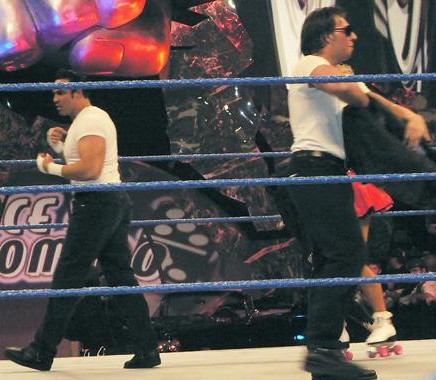
Deuce (left) and Domino (right) in a WWE ring

On the February 2 episode of SmackDown!, the team defeated the then-WWE Tag Team Champions, Paul London and Brian Kendrick, in a non-title match. Deuce 'n Domino faced London and Kendrick in a WWE Tag Team Championship match at February's pay-per-view event, No Way Out, but lost when Kendrick pinned Deuce via roll-up. On the April 20 episode of SmackDown!, they defeated London and Kendrick for the WWE Tag Team Championship when London was, in storyline, injured after missing a moonsault to the outside. Kendrick was left to defend the title by himself, and was pinned after being hit with Deuce 'n Domino's West Side Stomp finishing move. Three weeks later, London and Kendrick competed against William Regal and Dave Taylor. Deuce 'n Domino interfered, causing Regal and Taylor to be disqualified. This made both teams number one contenders leading to a triple threat tag team match the following week where Deuce 'n Domino retained the tag title.

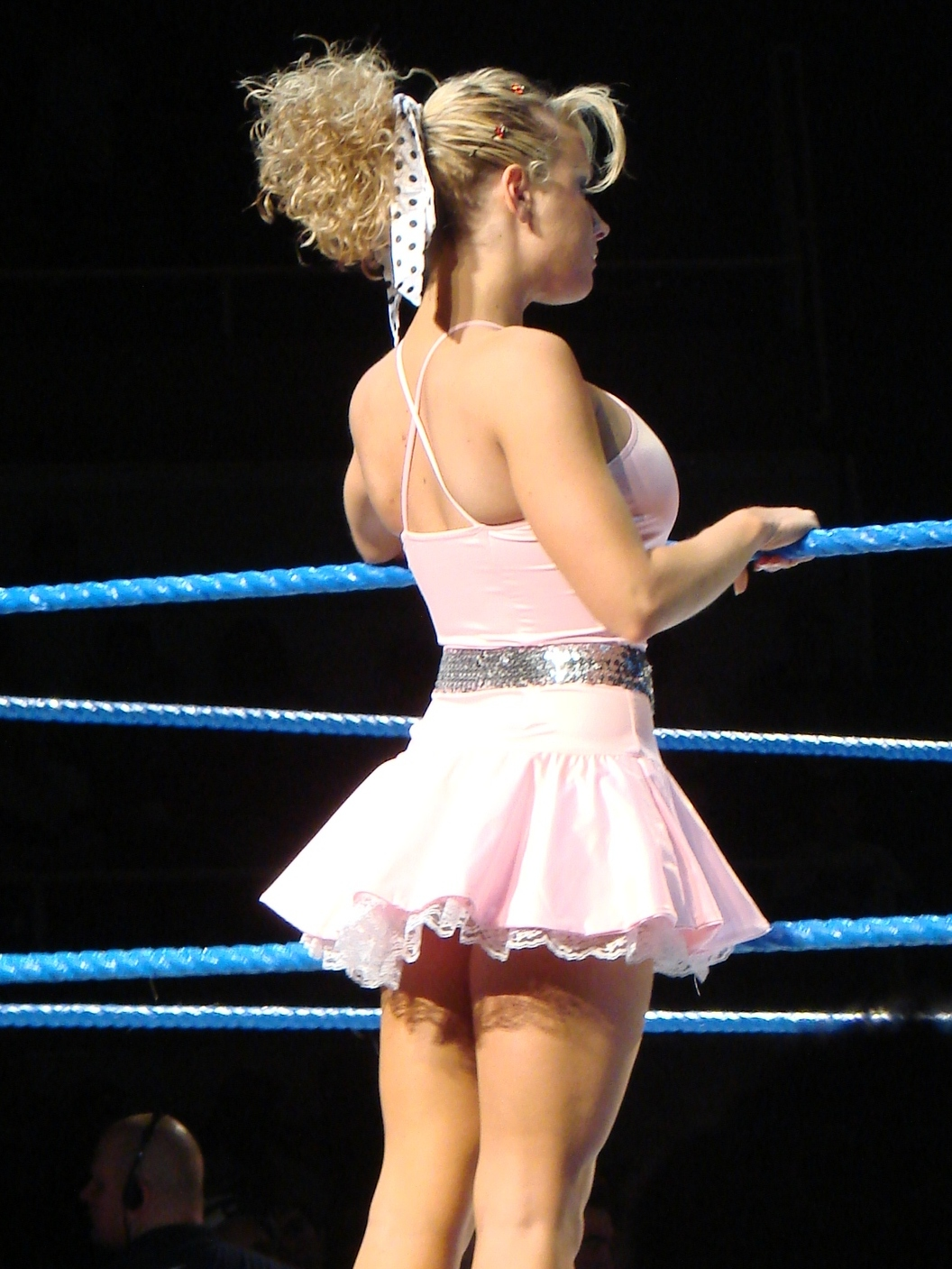
The teams original & first valet Cherry during a house show in February 2007

At the June event, Vengeance: Night of Champions, after insulting former Tag Team Champions Tony Garea and Rick Martel, Deuce 'n Domino defeated Sgt. Slaughter and Deuce's real-life father, "Superfly" Jimmy Snuka to retain their title. During a tag team match with Cryme Tyme (Shad Gaspard and JTG) in late June, Domino suffered an injury, which was diagnosed as a broken nose and a possible broken orbital bone socket in his eye. The injury would keep him out of the ring for a month.

Deuce n' Domino later engaged in a rivalry with Batista and Ric Flair. On the August 31 episode of SmackDown!, the team lost the WWE Tag Team Championship to Matt Hardy and the reigning WWE United States Champion, Montel Vontavious Porter. During the last few months of 2007, Deuce 'n Domino engaged in a short scripted rivalry with Hardy and MVP, Jimmy Wang Yang and Shannon Moore, Jesse and Festus, and Finlay and Hornswoggle. At the beginning of 2008, the team suffered a series of losses. At WrestleMania XXIV in March, the team participated in a 24-man Interpromotional Battle Royal, in which the winner would face Chavo Guerrero, then ECW Champion, later that night. Neither Deuce nor Domino won the match.

==== Split and aftermath (2008) ====
On the May 23 episode of SmackDown, Deuce 'n Domino parted ways with Cherry and replaced her with Maryse. On the June 20, 2008 episode of SmackDown, following a loss to Jesse and Festus, their second straight loss in two weeks, Deuce and Domino engaged in a fight with each other, and Deuce performed the Crack 'em in da Mouth finishing move on Domino. Deuce then threw his jacket over Domino, dissolving their partnership. The split was then further cemented when Deuce was drafted to the Raw brand as part of the 2008 WWE Supplemental Draft. Following the draft, Domino was predominantly featured as an enhancement talent. Deuce became Sim Snuka. In August 2008, Domino and Cherry were released from their WWE contracts. The following year, Deuce was released from the WWE as well.

In April 2016, Maryse made her return to the company and as of 2026, remains under contract, currently managing her real-life husband, The Miz.

=== Independent circuit (2021–present) ===
Thirteen years after the separation, Deuce 'n Domino along with Cherry have been reunited and now accepts bookings in the independent circuit.

== Championships and accomplishments ==
- Deep South Wrestling
  - Deep South Tag Team Championship (1 time)
- Ohio Valley Wrestling
  - OVW Southern Tag Team Championship (3 times)
- World Wrestling Entertainment
  - WWE Tag Team Championship (1 time)
