= DSW Tag Team Championship =

Professional wrestling tag team championship

Details
- Promotion: Deep South Wrestling
- Date established: March 15, 1986
Statistics
- First champions: Danny Davis and Ken Wayne
- Final champions: Caleb Konley and Sal Rinauro
- Most reigns: Danny Davis and Ken Wayne (3 reigns)
- Longest reign: Danny Davis and Ken Wayne (240 days)
- Shortest reign: The Untouchables (7 days)

The DSW Tag Team Championship was the tag team championship in Deep South Wrestling, a former developmental territory of World Wrestling Entertainment between 2005 and 2007. The title was last held by Caleb Konley and Sal Rinauro, who defeated Pretty Boy Floyd and Simon Sermon on July 26, 2007. The championships were reactivated in March 2025.

== Title history ==
Key
No.	Overall reign number
Reign	Reign number for the specific team—reign numbers for the individuals are in parentheses, if different
Days	Number of days held

No.	Champion	Championship change			Reign statistics		Notes	Ref.
No.	Champion	Date	Event	Location	Reign	Days	Notes	Ref.
1	The Nightmares (Danny Davis and Ken Wayne)	March 15, 1986	DSW event	Carrollton, Georgia	1	240	Recognized as champions upon promotion startup	
2	Ted and Jerry Oates	November 10, 1986	DSW show	Columbus, Georgia	1	52		
3	The Nightmares (Danny Davis and Ken Wayne)	January 1, 1987	DSW show	Columbus, Georgia	2	9		
4	The Assassins	January 10, 1987	DSW show	Georgia	1	301		
4	The Nightmares (Danny Davis and Ken Wayne)	November 7, 1987	DSW show	Athens, Georgia	3	290		
—	Vacated	September 10, 1988	—	—	—	—		
—	Deactivated	October 18, 1988	—	—	—	—	DSW closed	
5	High Impact (Mike Taylor and Tony Santarelli)	May 18, 2006	DSW show	McDonough, Georgia	1	140	Defeated The Gymini (Jake and Jesse) in a tournament final when the promotion reopens as a talent developmental league of WWE	
6	The Untouchables (Deuce Shade and Domino)	October 5, 2006	DSW show	McDonough, Georgia	1	7	With this win, The Untouchables held both developmental (DSW and OVW) tag team championships	
7	The Majors Brothers (Brian and Brett Majors)	October 12, 2006	DSW show	McDonough, Georgia	1	49		
8	Urban Assault (Eric Perez and Sonny Siaki)	November 30, 2006	DSW show	McDonough, Georgia	1	14		
9	The Regulators (Mike and Todd Shane)	December 14, 2006	DSW show	McDonough, Georgia	1	36		
—	Vacated	January 19, 2007	—	—	—	—	Title vacated due to the release of The Regulators on the previous day	
10	The Majors Brothers (Brian and Brett Majors)	January 19, 2007	DSW event	McDonough, Georgia	2	48	Defeated The Samoan Fight Club (Sonny Siaki and Afa, Jr.) and William Regal and Dave Taylor in a three way match	
11	Team Elite (Derrick Neikirk and Mike Knox)	March 8, 2007	DSW show	McDonough, Georgia	1	41		
—	Vacated	April 18, 2007	—	—	—	—	Title vacated when WWE ended its developmental deal with DSW; Defeated Pretty Boy Floyd and Simon Sermon	
12	Caleb Konley and Sal Rinauro	July 26, 2007	DSW show	Locust Grove, Georgia	1	77		
—	Deactivated	October 11, 2007	—	—	—	—	DSW closed	
13	DJ Smoke and Najasism	March 23, 2025	DSW show	Atlanta, Georgia	1			Defeated Austin Towers and Jay Alpha Miller in a tournament final to reactivate the titles.
