= Paul London and Brian Kendrick =

Professional wrestling tag team

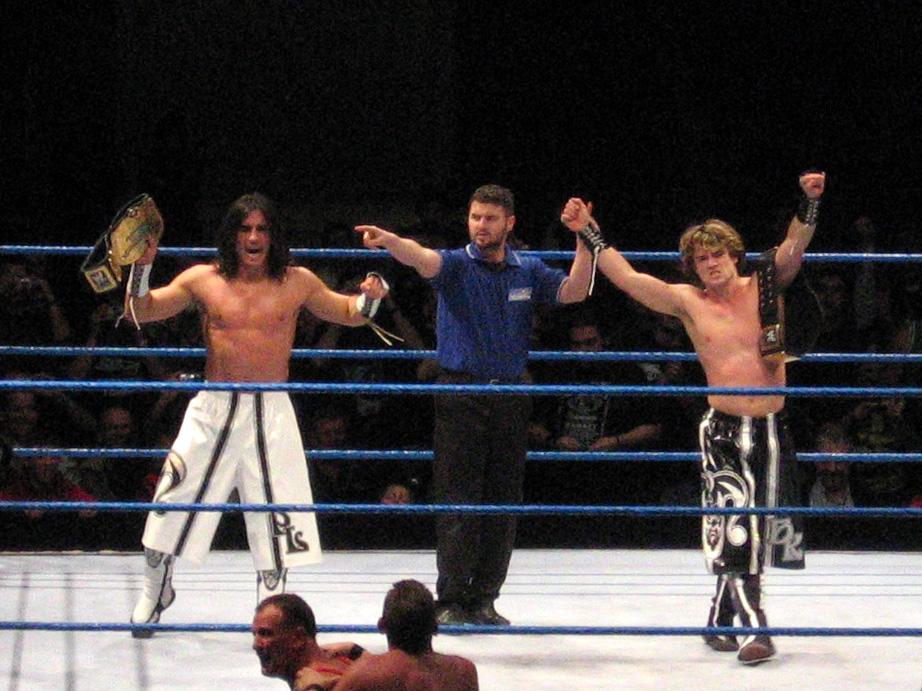
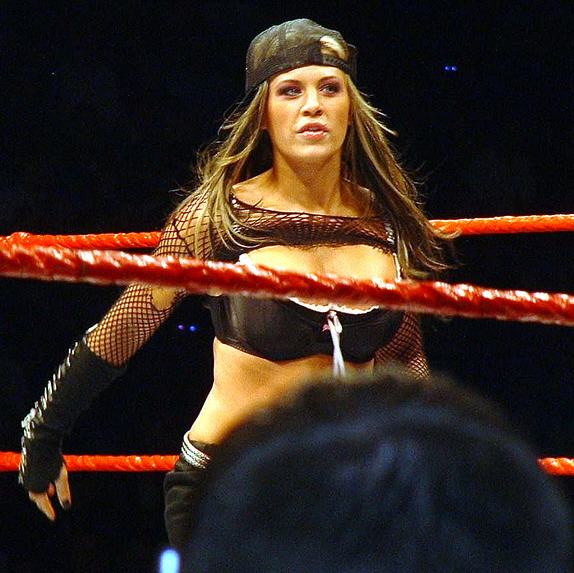
- 1st pic Paul London (left) and Brian Kendrick (right) with referee Chris Kay; 2nd pic their valet Ashley Massaro

Tag team
- Members: Paul London; Brian Kendrick / Spanky; Ashley Massaro (valet)
- Name(s): The Hooligans; Paul London and Brian Kendrick
- Billed heights: London: 5 ft 10 in (1.78 m); Kendrick: 5 ft 8 in (1.73 m)
- Combined billed weight: 366 lb (166 kg)
- Debut: 2003
- Disbanded: 2014
- Years active: 2003–2004; 2005–2008; 2010–2014
- Trained by: Texas Wrestling Academy

Paul London and Brian Kendrick were an American professional wrestling tag team for World Wrestling Entertainment (WWE). They are former WWE Tag Team Champions and World Tag Team Champions. Their 2006-2007 reign as WWE Tag Team Champions was the longest in the title's history until their record was broken by The New Day on July 20, 2016.

They first began teaming together in 2003 as a part of WWE, but Kendrick left the company shortly thereafter. When he returned in mid-2005, he and London reunited as a tag team. In May 2006 the duo won the WWE Tag Team Championship from MNM; it was Kendrick's first title victory with the company, and London's third. Their reign was the longest since WWE created the title in 2002, and they became the fourth longest-reigning tag team champions in the company's history, finally dropping the titles to Deuce 'n Domino in April 2007.

Later in 2007, London and Kendrick were drafted from SmackDown to the Raw brand, where they briefly held the World Tag Team Championship. They would continue to work together until Kendrick was drafted back to SmackDown in the 2008 supplemental draft, thus disbanding the team until 2010, when they reunited in Pro Wrestling Guerrilla following their releases from WWE. They have since competed together on the independent circuit on several occasions, notably winning the ICW Tag Team Championship as The Hooligans.

== History ==
=== Name ===
The team never had an official team name, but were just referred to as "the tag team of London and Kendrick." In 2006 London and Kendrick put the tag team name "The Hooliganz" on their wrestling attires and tried to convince the WWE management to start calling the team by that name, but were unsuccessful in their attempts. They would eventually use a slightly modified version of that name, The Hooligans, on the independent circuit.

=== Beginnings ===
Prior to teaming together on World Wrestling Entertainment (WWE)'s SmackDown! brand, both Paul London and Brian "Spanky" Kendrick along with Daniel Bryan were students at Shawn Michaels' Texas Wrestling Academy, under the tutelage of Rudy Boy Gonzalez. From there they both went on to Ring of Honor, where they occasionally competed against each other and as a team.

=== World Wrestling Entertainment (2003-2008) ===
==== Formation (2003–2004) ====
In late 2002, Kendrick was hired by WWE, and in July 2003 London joined the company as well. Once in WWE together, and both on the SmackDown! brand, London and Kendrick began teaming together in September of that year. They became a mainstay on SmackDown!'s sister show Velocity until Kendrick left the company in February 2004.

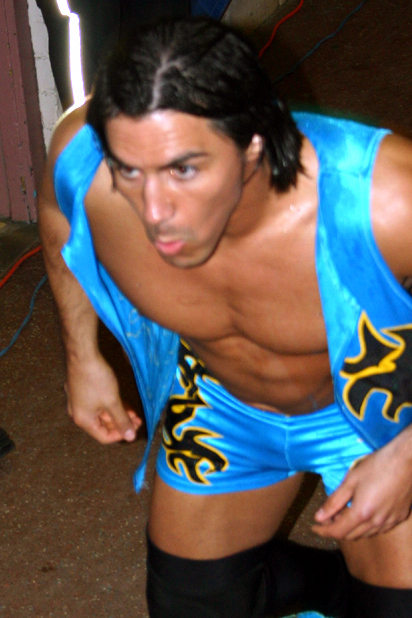
One member of the group Paul London

==== WWE Tag Team Champions (2005-2007) ====
Kendrick returned in mid-2005, using his real name, and in September 2005 London and Kendrick reformed as a tag team. Upon reuniting the team began competing in matching shorts and vests as well as wearing theatrical masks to the ring. Subsequently, they were quickly elevated into the WWE Tag Team Championship picture, receiving a non-title match against WWE Tag Team Champions MNM (Johnny Nitro and Joey Mercury) on the February 10, 2006 episode of SmackDown!, which London and Kendrick lost. On the April 7, 2006 episode of SmackDown! London and Kendrick once again faced MNM, this time picking up a win in a non-title match. London and Kendrick continued their winning streak against the champions, earning singles victories for Kendrick and London over Nitro and Mercury respectively, leading to a title match at Judgment Day, where London and Kendrick won their first WWE Tag Team Championship as a team (London's second WWE Tag Team Title reign and Kendrick's first championship in WWE).

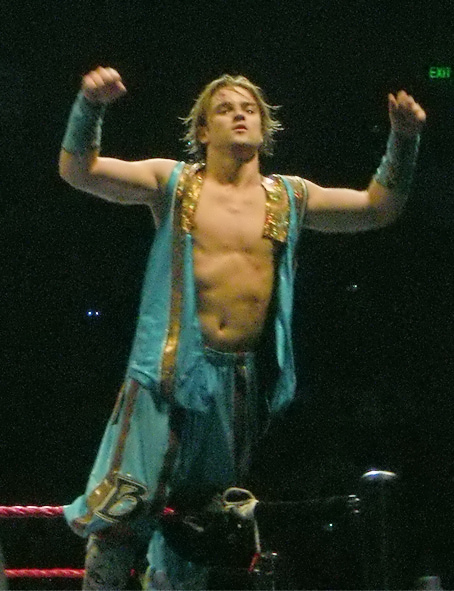
Kendrick during the team's ring entrance

Their first main competition for the titles came when K. C. James and Idol Stevens defeated London and Kendrick in a non-title match, in early August, igniting a storyline feud between the two teams. During the rivalry, WWE Diva Ashley Massaro began accompanying London and Kendrick to the ring, acting as a valet to the team while combating the actions of James and Stevens' manager Michelle McCool.

On October 14, 2006, they became the longest reigning WWE Tag Team Champions of all time, surpassing MNM's previous record reign of 145 days. The record stood until it was broken by The New Day in July 2016. The team began a losing streak to the team of William Regal and Dave Taylor, with Regal defeating both London and Kendrick in singles matches and losing a non-title tag team match to the pair on the December 8 episode of SmackDown!.

A scheduled title match between the two teams at Armageddon was changed at the event to a four-way ladder match, also involving The Hardys (Matt and Jeff) and MNM. In the match London and Kendrick were able to retrieve the belts to retain their championship. When a regular tag team rematch was signed with Regal and Taylor two weeks later, London and Kendrick were successful in defeating them. On the February 16 episode of SmackDown!, General manager Theodore Long scheduled another ladder match between the teams of London and Kendrick, Regal and Taylor, MNM, and The Hardys for the WWE Tag Team Championship at February's pay-per-view event No Way Out, but WWE's official website announced the match had changed to pit The Hardys and Chris Benoit against MNM and MVP, while London and Kendrick faced rookie team Deuce 'n Domino (Deuce and Domino) in a separate match; they were booked to successfully retain the titles against Deuce 'n Domino. Their almost year-long reign came to an end when they were defeated by Deuce 'n Domino for the title on the April 20, 2007 episode of SmackDown! in Milan, Italy. London picked up an injury, resulting in Kendrick challenging Deuce 'n Domino in singles matches, losing to Deuce, but defeating Domino. London returned on the May 11 episode of SmackDown!, defeating Domino in a singles match. London and Kendrick then unsuccessfully attempted to regain the Tag Team Championship, losing to Deuce 'n Domino in a triple threat match also involving Regal and Taylor, and in a standard tag team match two weeks later.

==== World Tag Team Championship pursuit (2007-2008) ====
London and Kendrick were drafted to Raw as the first picks in the WWE Supplemental Draft on June 17, 2007 and were successful on their Raw debut, defeating The World's Greatest Tag Team (Shelton Benjamin and Charlie Haas) via a Sliced Bread #2 performed on Haas. On the September 3 episode of Raw, London and Kendrick defeated The World's Greatest Tag Team once again to earn a World Tag Team Championship match at Unforgiven against Lance Cade and Trevor Murdoch, in which they lost. Two days later, they defeated Cade and Murdoch for the title at a house show in South Africa. Three days later, at another house show, Cade and Murdoch regained the title in a rematch.

Near the end of 2007, London suffered a foot injury and was unable to compete, and Kendrick was mainly used as a singles wrestler on Raw where he lost to the likes of Umaga and Mr. Kennedy. London made his return on February 4 in a loss to Santino Marella and Carlito. London and Kendrick returned as a tag team on the March 17 episode of Raw in a loss to Umaga when Kendrick walked out on London. The two reunited on Raw on March 31 with commentator Jim Ross explaining the two worked out their differences, and they got a win against the then-World Tag Team Champions, Cody Rhodes and Hardcore Holly. On April 14, they lost a number one contendership match to the team of Carlito and Marella. They competed sporadically on Raw in the following months, defeating Lance Cade and Trevor Murdoch, before receiving a World Tag Team title shot against Holly and Rhodes on the May 26 episode of Raw. They lost when Holly pinned London following an Alabama slam.

==== Split and aftermath (2008) ====
The team came to an end in June 2008, when Kendrick was drafted to the SmackDown brand as part of the 2008 Supplemental Draft, while London stayed on Raw. He made his return to the brand on the July 18, 2008 airing of SmackDown as a heel, with new ring attire defeating Jimmy Wang Yang with the help of his new bodyguard, Ezekiel Jackson. Kendrick was later given the name "The Brian Kendrick".

London was utilized sparingly during the next few months, making his only television appearance in a loss to Lance Cade on the July 21 episode of Raw. London was subsequently released from his WWE contract on November 7, 2008. On July 31, 2009, Kendrick was also released.

=== Independent circuit (2010–2014) ===
Going into 2010, the team made occasional reunions on the independent circuit. On January 30 the team completed at Pro Wrestling Guerrilla's part of the aptly titled WrestleReunion 4 show. They defeated the PWG World Tag Team Champions Generation Me (Jeremy and Max) in a non-title match in their first match back together.

On March 27, London and Kendrick made an appearance in Dragon Gate USA, where Kendrick had already appeared in singles competition. However, their run as a tag team in the company was short-lived due to losing a Pinfall Loser Leaves Company match to Jimmy Jacobs and Jack Evans and as a result Kendrick, who tapped out to Jacobs, was forced to leave the company for good.

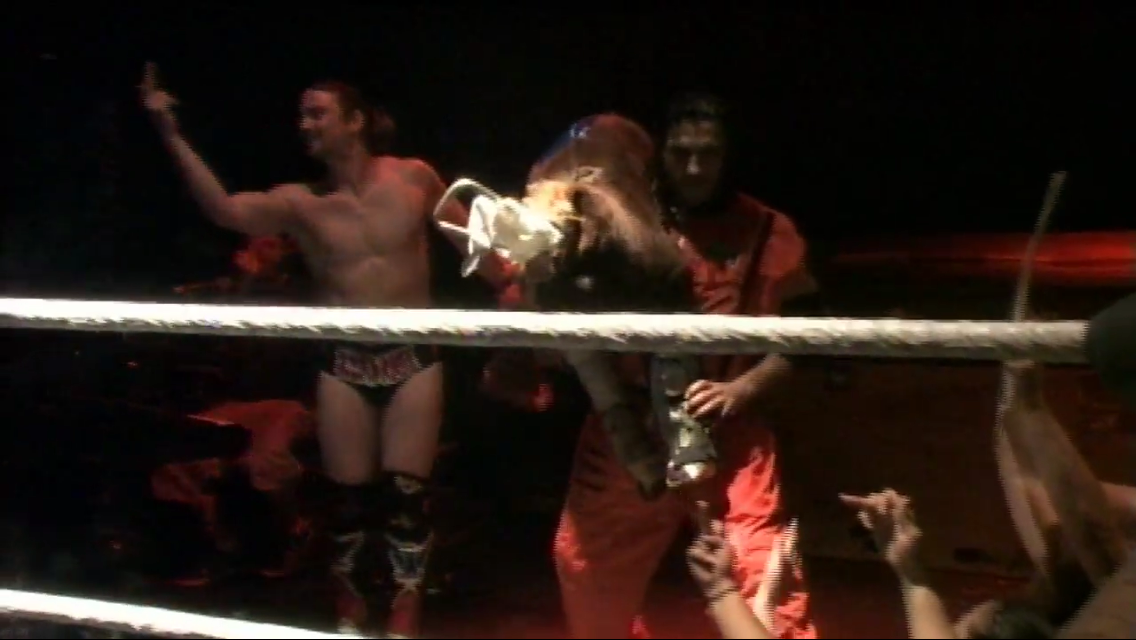
London and Kendrick on the independent circuit at a Hoodslam event.

They reunited once again on October 4, 2012, at the first Family Wrestling Entertainment's PPV, Back 2 Brooklyn. They, along with Jay Lethal, defeated the team of The Young Bucks and Petey Williams. London and Kendrick defeated The Young Bucks when they wrestled again on October 6, 2012, at the House of Hardcore's first show. On June 23, 2013, London and Kendrick were defeated by The Young Buck at House of Hardcore 2. London and Kendrick were defeated at PWG's Ten by Chuck Taylor and Johnny Gargano.

In 2014, London and Kendrick traveled to Scotland to compete for Insane Championship Wrestling. On October 15, the pair won the ICW Tag Team Championship by defeating The New Age Kliq (BT Gunn and Chris Renfrew) at Helter Skelter. On November 2, 2014, they lost the title to Polo Promotions (Mark Coffey and Jackie Polo) In Glasgow, Scotland. In 2014, Kendrick returned to WWE, thus separating with London.

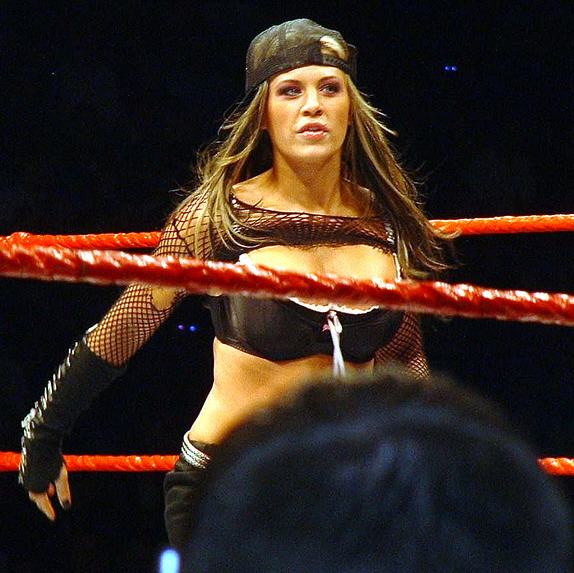
Ashley Massaro, who was the valet for London and Kendrick in 2006.

== Championships and accomplishments ==
- Insane Championship Wrestling
  - ICW Tag Team Championship (1 time)
- Pro Wrestling Illustrated
  - Tag Team of the Year (2007)
- World Wrestling Entertainment
  - World Tag Team Championship (1 time)
  - WWE Tag Team Championship (1 time)
