= Deuce (wrestler) =

American professional wrestler (born 1971)

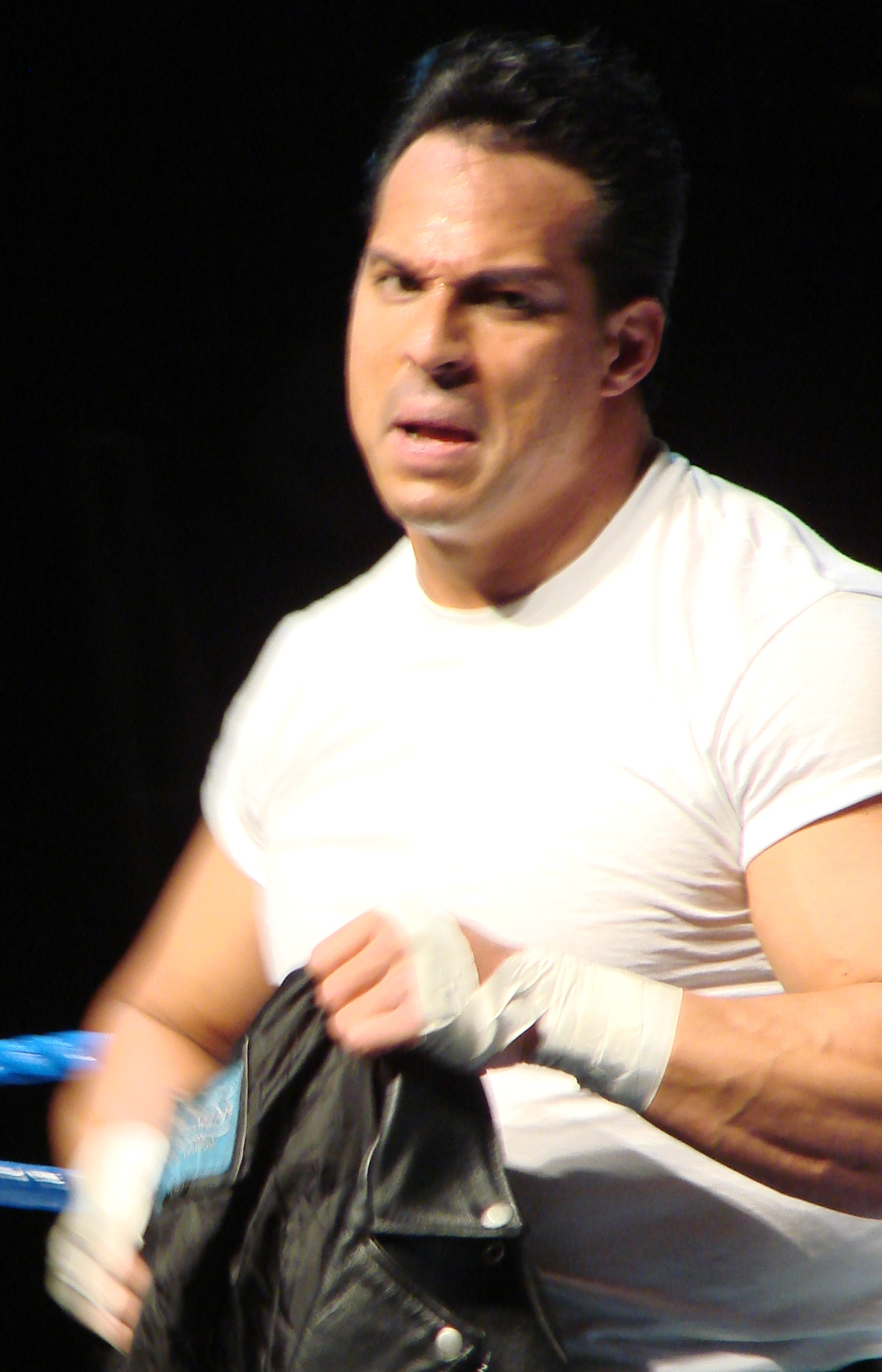
- Deuce in 2007

Personal information
- Born: James Wiley Smith Thomas Reiher Snuka; September 1, 1971 (age 55) Fiji
- Spouse: Michelle Sierra (m. 2000)
- Children: 1
- Family: Jimmy Snuka (father); Tamina Snuka (sister); Anoaʻi

Professional wrestling career
- Ring name(s): Deuce; Deuce Shade; Jimmy Snuka Jr. Sim Snuka; Solo; Solo Snuka; Deuce Snuka
- Billed height: 6 ft 1 in (1.85 m)
- Billed weight: 235 lb (107 kg)
- Billed from: Laie, Hawaii; The Other Side of the Tracks
- Trained by: Jimmy Snuka; Ultimate Pro Wrestling; Ohio Valley Wrestling
- Debut: 2000

James Wiley Smith Thomas Reiher Snuka (born September 1, 1971) is a Fijian and American professional wrestler. He is best known for his time in World Wrestling Entertainment (WWE) under the ring name Deuce.

The son of professional wrestler Jimmy Snuka, Reiher began wrestling in the late 1990s, and worked for the UWA and the Xcitement Wrestling Federation. After signing a contract with World Wrestling Entertainment (WWE), Reiher was assigned to WWE's developmental territory Ohio Valley Wrestling (OVW) in Louisville, Kentucky in 2005, where he wrestled under the name Deuce Shade. He was placed in tag team competition, alongside Dice Domino. Along with their manager Cherry, the group were known as The Throw-Backs and later The Untouchables, and captured the OVW Southern Tag Team Championship on three occasions. Deuce also won the OVW Television Championship on one occasion in singles competition.

The group was called up to the SmackDown! roster in January 2007, and underwent a name change to Deuce 'n Domino. Three months later, Deuce 'n Domino won the WWE Tag Team Championship. After dropping the title in August 2007, the group disbanded in June 2008. Deuce moved to the Raw brand and became known as Sim Snuka, and the following year, on June 19, 2009, he was released from his WWE contract.

== Professional wrestling career ==
=== Early career (1999–2005) ===
After deciding to become a professional wrestler, Reiher trained with his father, Jimmy Snuka in New Jersey. He then began working under the ring name Solo in the UWA in California. During his time in UWA, he was offered a contract by World Wrestling Entertainment (WWE), but turned it down in favor of a more lucrative contract from UWA. After the UWA went out of business in late 2001, Reiher began working for the Xcitement Wrestling Federation (XWF), a promotion run by Jimmy Hart, The Nasty Boys, and Greg Valentine. In XWF, he used the name Jimmy Snuka Jr. and was managed by his father. He appeared at the first round of XWF tapings in November 2001, defeating Buddy Lee Parker and Vapor in two separate matches.

=== World Wrestling Entertainment (2005–2009) ===
==== Ohio Valley Wrestling (2005–2006) ====
Reiher made his debut in Ohio Valley Wrestling (OVW) on January 27, 2005, as Deuce Shade, defeating Brent Albright. On May 24, 2005, he defeated Chad Wicks in an OVW Television Championship tournament match. He later went on to beat Ken Doane in the tournament finals for the OVW Television Championship on June 7. He ended up losing it to Doane later that month. On August 24, Shade won a number one contenders battle royal to earn the right to face OVW Champion Johnny Jeter later that night, but he lost this match.

In January 2006, Shade started teaming with Dice Domino, calling themselves "The Throw-Backs". It was at this time that Cherry Pie began accompanying them to the ring, as their valet. They later changed their name to "The Untouchables", and removed the Shade, Dice, and Pie parts of their respective names. On March 19, Reiher defeated Mike Mizanin to win the OVW Southern Tag Team Championship for his team. The team lost their titles on April 5, in a three-way match to Roadkill and K.C James; the match also involved Kenny and Mikey of the Spirit Squad.

In mid-August 2006, The Untouchables quickly became embroiled in a scripted rivalry with Cody Runnels and Shawn Spears over the OVW Southern Tag Team Championship. Runnels and Spears captured the title from The Untouchables on October 18. In November 2006, Runnels and Spears defeated The Untouchables in a tag team match, and won the services of their valet, Cherry. On November 29, the OVW Southern Tag Team Championship was vacated after a match between The Untouchables and Runnels and Spears ended in a draw. The following week, a rematch between the two teams was held for the vacant championship. During this match Cherry turned on Spears and Runnels, re-joining The Untouchables and helping them regain the OVW Southern Tag Team Championship. Two weeks later, on December 20, Runnels and Spears defeated The Untouchables in a Street Fight to win the championship.

==== SmackDown! (2007–2008) ====
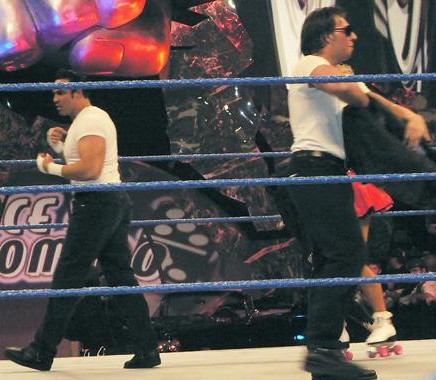
Deuce (left) with Domino before a match on a SmackDown! taping

On the January 19, 2007 episode of SmackDown!, the team, now using the name "Deuce 'n Domino", along with Cherry, debuted with their 1950s greaser in-ring persona. They quickly defeated a team of jobbers—wrestlers who consistently lose to make their opponents look stronger—and did the same to another jobber team the next week. On the February 2 episode of SmackDown!, they defeated WWE Tag Team Champions Paul London and Brian Kendrick in a non-title match. They earned a chance at the championship at No Way Out, but failed to win the title. On the April 13 episode of SmackDown!, Deuce and Domino got a chance at the tag titles again, but lost after Deuce got them disqualified. The next week on SmackDown!, they defeated London and Kendrick to win the tag team titles. On the May 25 episode of SmackDown!, London and Kendrick competed against William Regal and Dave Taylor, but Deuce and Domino interfered, resulting in Regal and Taylor being disqualified. This made both teams the number one contender, which led to a triple threat tag match the next week where Deuce and Domino retained the titles. On June 24, Deuce and Domino issued an open challenge at the pay-per-view event, Vengeance, which was accepted by Jimmy Snuka (Deuce's father) and Sgt. Slaughter. Deuce and Domino retained their title.

On the June 29 episode of SmackDown!, Domino suffered an injury during a match with Cryme Tyme, sidelining him for a month. After Domino's return, the team began a scripted rivalry with Batista and Ric Flair. On the August 31 episode of SmackDown!, he and Domino lost their tag team title to Montel Vontavious Porter (MVP) and Matt Hardy. They engaged in a rivalry with MVP and Hardy, and attempted to regain their championship, but were unsuccessful.

Throughout late 2007 and early 2008, Deuce 'n Domino wrestled sporadically, facing teams such as Jimmy Wang Yang and Shannon Moore, Jesse and Festus, and Finlay and Hornswoggle. On the May 23 episode of SmackDown, Deuce and Domino parted ways with Cherry and replaced her with WWE Diva Maryse. After a series of losses, Deuce attacked Domino on the June 20, 2008 episode of SmackDown to end their partnership.

==== Repackaging (2008–2009) ====
As part of the 2008 WWE Supplemental Draft, Deuce was drafted to the Raw brand. He made his debut for the brand on the September 22 airing of Raw, losing to Santino Marella. On the December 15, 2008 episode of Raw, Deuce announced that his new ring name would be "Sim Snuka", after revealing his father is Jimmy Snuka, and faced Rey Mysterio in a losing attempt; after Mysterio fell into Cody Rhodes and Manu, who were at ringside, they attacked Mysterio, and the match ended in a disqualification. Two weeks later, he defeated Charlie Haas (who was dressed as Snuka's father) to pass step one towards earning a spot in Randy Orton's Legacy faction. A week later, Snuka teamed with Rhodes against Cryme Tyme, with Rhodes getting the pinfall. It was revealed after the match that only the man who got the pinfall would advance into the group, leaving Snuka out. He, along with Manu, brought back Ted DiBiase to help them attack The Legacy, only to be betrayed and attacked by DiBiase, Orton and Rhodes.

Following this, Snuka appeared rarely. His last WWE appearance was at WrestleMania 25, where he posed as an unnamed cameraman during the match between Shawn Michaels and The Undertaker, and failed to catch The Undertaker during a suicide dive spot during the bout. He was released from his WWE contract on June 19, 2009.

=== National Wrestling Alliance (2009) ===
In November, Snuka began to appear on promotional posters for shows in the NWA-Southwest and Phoenix regions, now under the name 'Simm Snuka'. On November 28, 2009, he made his debut for NWA, teaming with his father Jimmy Snuka to defeat Hellcat and Triple X at NWA New York Raging Gladiator Wrestling III. On November 30, he made a challenge to Blue Demon Jr. for a shot at his NWA World Heavyweight Championship in a match in Texas at the NWA Southwest Anniversary Show. However the match never occurred. On December 12, Snuka defeated GQ Gallo at another NWA branded event.

=== Independent circuit and first retirement (2009–2017) ===
On October 24, 2009, Snuka and Lawrence Tyler defeated Devon Willis and Sonny Samson. After not wrestling for four years, he returned to face Graves for the Championship Wrestling from Arizona Heavyweight Title. Snuka would win the match but not return to the promotion. The following year his only match was at a NWA/UCW event where he would be on the winning team of a six-man tag match alongside his father, it would be his last time teaming with him before his father's death. In 2017 his final match to date was competing in a Battle Royal for the APWA promotion.

=== Return to independent circuit (2021–present) ===
Thirteen years after the separation, Reiher along with Treiber and Drew reformed the Deuce 'n Domino stable and now accept bookings in the independent circuit.

== Personal life ==
Prior to entering the wrestling business, Reiher worked as a youth counselor and a television cameraman in Utah. Reiher is a former Mr. Hawaiian Islands in bodybuilding.

Reiher is a second-generation wrestler; his father James Reiher wrestled using the name Jimmy Snuka. Reiher's sister Sarona works for WWE as "Tamina". His daughter Penina attends the University of Arizona, where she plays volleyball for the Arizona Wildcats. Through his mother Sharon, Reiher is part of the Anoaʻi wrestling family.

== Championships and accomplishments ==
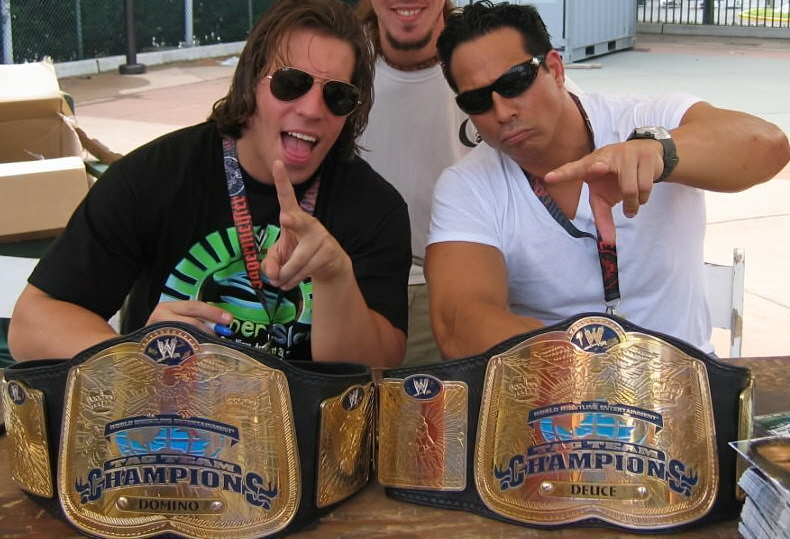
Deuce is a former WWE Tag Team Champion with Domino

- American Pro Wrestling Alliance
  - APWA Tri State Championship (2 times)
- Championship Wrestling From Arizona
  - CWFAZ Heavyweight Championship (1 time)
- Deep South Wrestling
  - DSW Tag Team Championship (1 time) – with Domino
- International Wrestling Association
  - IWA Hardcore Championship (1 time)
- Ohio Valley Wrestling
  - OVW Southern Tag Team Championship (3 times) – with Domino
  - OVW Television Championship (1 time)
- Pro Wrestling Illustrated
  - Ranked No. 150 of the top 500 singles wrestlers in the PWI 500 in 2009
- World Wrestling Entertainment
  - WWE Tag Team Championship (1 time) – with Domino
