= Kasey James =

American professional wrestler

Personal information
- Born: Kurt Sellers; March 20, 1982 (age 44) Belvidere, Illinois, U.S.

Professional wrestling career
- Ring name(s): Kurt Sellers; Kasey James; KC James; James Curtis
- Billed height: 6 ft 2 in (1.88 m)
- Billed weight: 235 lb (107 kg)
- Billed from: Rockford, Illinois
- Trained by: Rockin' Randy Ricci
- Debut: December 15, 2001
- Retired: September 5, 2009

Kurt Sellers (born March 20, 1982), better known as Kasey/KC James or James Curtis, is an American retired professional wrestler. He is best known for his time in World Wrestling Entertainment (WWE).

== Career ==
=== Early career (2001–2004) ===
James started his career along with CM Punk, Colt Cabana, Brad Bradley, and Adam Pearce under the training of Rockin' Randy and the NAWF. He also held the NAWF North American Title.

=== International Wrestling Association (2004–2005) ===
James also spent a lot of time in Puerto Rico for the IWA teaming with Glamour Boy Shane, Bison Smith, and Chet the Jet. He won the Intercontinental title and is a former three-time tag team champion. He was also a member of Savio Vega's La Compania and was managed by Jose Chapparo. KC James became infamous within the IWA when he brought in a wrestler named "Carlitos" to parody Carlito when he was still with the World Wrestling Council. James often called the fans in attendance "you puercos", which translates as "you pigs". He feuded with Miguel Pérez Jr., Chicano, Slash Venom, Glamour Boy Shane, Rikishi, and Invader #1.

=== World Wrestling Entertainment (2006–2008) ===
Along with Roadkill, James won the Ohio Valley Wrestling Southern Tag Team Championship from The Untouchables (Domino and Deuce Shade) on April 5, 2006 in Louisville, Kentucky. Roadkill and James lost the titles on May 27, 2006 to Shad Gaspard and Neighborhoodie in Louisville, Kentucky, before he was called up to WWE's main roster.

On August 4, 2006, James made his SmackDown! debut when he was introduced (along with Idol Stevens) by Michelle McCool as one of her favorite "Teacher's Pets". The two went on to defeat Funaki and Scotty 2 Hotty with the help of McCool.

The following week, Stevens and James defeated WWE Tag Team Champions Paul London and Brian Kendrick in a non-title match. On the August 18 edition of SmackDown, Stevens and James ambushed the Tag Team Champions.

James and Stevens had many run-ins with the WWE Tag Team Champions Paul London and Brian Kendrick and "The Pit Bulls" (until Kid Kash was released from his contract), leading up to a title match at No Mercy, which London and Kendrick won.

After McCool got injured, the tag team fell apart in early March 2007. He was then moved to Ohio Valley Wrestling (OVW), where he was placed in a tag team alongside Cassidy O'Reilly. Calling themselves The James Boys, they defeated The Major Brothers to capture the OVW Southern Tag Team Championship on June 29, 2007. In September, James once again started wrestling dark matches for WWE. Wrestling as "James Curtis", he defeated Colt Cabana on November 17, to become the OVW Television Champion. On December 14, he beat Cody Rhodes in a title defense. He lost the title to Jamin Olivencia on February 20, 2008 due to OVW and WWE parting ways on February 7.

He appeared regularly on ECW as a jobber throughout the end of 2007 and the start of 2008, losing to wrestlers such as Kevin Thorn, CM Punk, Shelton Benjamin and others. After a period of inactivity, he returned on the July 22, 2008 edition of ECW, losing to Evan Bourne. He wrestled his final WWE match on the August 5 edition of ECW in a losing effort to Braden Walker.

On August 8, 2008, Sellers was released from his WWE contract.

=== Return to IWA and later career (2008-2009) ===
James returned to Puerto Rico for the International Wrestling Association (IWA) on September 6, 2008, attacking Savio Vega.

He wrestled his last match on September 5, 2009 losing to Lord Humongous for Global Championship Wrestling in Alabama. He retired afterwards.

== Championships and accomplishments ==
- International Wrestling Association
  - IWA Intercontinental Heavyweight Championship (1 time)
  - IWA World Tag Team Championship (3 times) - with Glamour Boy Shane (1) and Chet Jablonski (2)
- Ohio Valley Wrestling
  - OVW Southern Tag Team Championship (5 times) - with Roadkill (1) and Kassidy James (4)
  - OVW Television Championship (1 time)
- North American Wrestling Federation
  - NAWF North American Championship (1 time)
