= Tony Salantri =

American professional wrestler (born 1980)

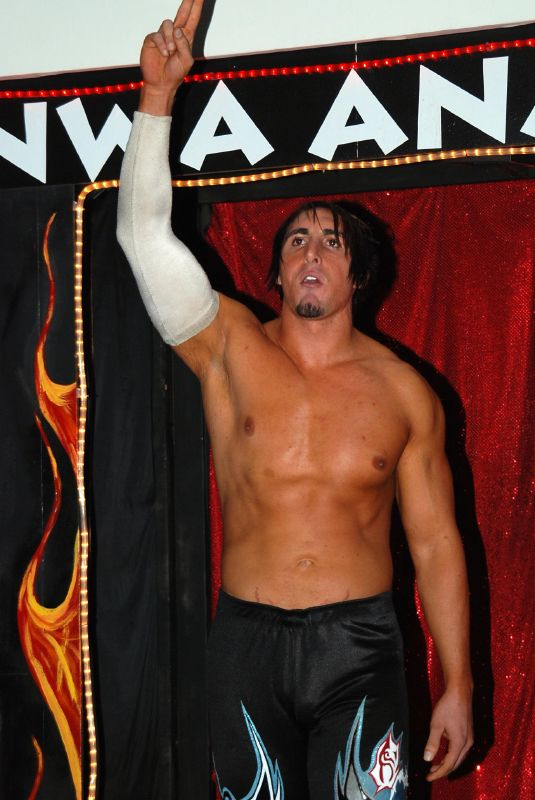
- Salantri in 2007

Personal information
- Born: Anthony Salantri; October 4, 1980 (age 45) Los Angeles, California, U.S.

Professional wrestling career
- Ring name(s): Tony Salantri; Tony Santarelli; Tony Stradlin
- Billed height: 6 ft 1 in (185 cm)
- Billed weight: 200 lb (91 kg)
- Billed from: Los Angeles, California
- Trained by: Shawn Michaels Wrestling Academy; Dave Taylor
- Debut: 2000
- Retired: 2008

Anthony Salantri (born October 4, 1980) is an American former professional wrestler, better known by his ring names Tony Santarelli or Tony Stradlin, who is best known for his competed in North American promotions including Combat Zone Wrestling (CZW), the National Wrestling Alliance (NWA), as well as New Japan Pro-Wrestling (NJPW), Pro Wrestling Zero1 (Zero1), Deep South Wrestling (DSW), and World Wrestling Entertainment (WWE). One half of the tag team High Impact with Mike Taylor, he and Taylor were the first DSW Tag Team Champions.

== Professional wrestling career ==
=== Early career ===
Salantri started training with Shawn Michaels' Texas Wrestling Academy in 2000. During 2001, Salantri began wrestling for NWA Wildside participating in a battle royal for the NWA "Beat the Champ" Championship on April 19. He was the last man to be eliminated by Destiny.

In July, he made an appearance at CZW Deja Vu losing to M-Dogg 20 and, the following year, he performed for Bill Behrens' NWA Wildside forming a tag team with Todd Sexton. Known as TNT, he and Sexton would feud with the Lost Boys over the NWA Wildside Tag Team Championship holding the titles on two occasions.

Salantri moved on to Ultimate Pro Wrestling teaming with Kid Vicious, he lost to MTV celebrity wrestler The Real World's The Miz and Lil Nate on July 11, 2003. During early 2004, he would defeat Lil Nate in a singles match and later won the Mat Wars championship tournament defeating The Miz in the tournament finals. On May 16, he lost to Tatsuhito Takaiwa in a match for the vacant NWA International Junior Heavyweight Championship in Tokyo, Japan on May 16.

Briefly feuding with Frankie Kazarian, he and Tommy Wilson began teaming together defeating Frankie Kazarian & Andrew Hellman on June 12 and Supa Badd & Shawn Riddik on July 17, 2004. After appearing on WWE Velocity against Último Dragón on December 13, he joined Pro Wrestling Guerrilla in October 2004 although had little success, he did score later victories over Frankie Kazarian, Christopher Daniels and Colt Cabana.

=== World Wrestling Entertainment ===
On March 17, 2005 Salantri signed a contract with World Wrestling Entertainment (WWE) although he continued wrestling for NWA Wildside during early 2005, teaming with Sexton, losing to Azrael and Tony Mamaluke and, in a 6-man tag team match with Brandon Thomaselli and Todd Sexton, defeated Caprice Coleman, Sal and Vito Thomaselli on April 16. Making his last appearance on April 30, he and Sexton lost to Caprice Coleman and Tony Mamaluke after both he and Sexton were put in submission holds.

Eventually assigned to WWE's Deep South Wrestling territory under the name Tony Santarelli, he formed High Impact with Mike Taylor and made their debut at Deep South Wrestling's first televised event, defeating The Regulators (Mike & Todd Shane) on September 1, although they lost to the Shane Twins in a rematch at a WWE live event three days later as well as to Team Elite on September 8.

Defeating Kid Kash and Johnny Parisi and the Slaughter Boys later that month, they also wrestled Team Elite to a 30-minute time limit draw on September 30. Facing Team Elite and The Regulators in several matches during October, Salantri also faced Mike Knox in a singles match losing to him on October 27. Defeating Nunzio and Big Vito on November 3 due to outside interference by The Regulators, he would also defeat Palmer Cannon during the opening rounds of the DSW Heavyweight Championship Tournament before being eliminated in the semi-finals by Mike Knox on December 1, 2005.

After defeating Team Elite on December 15, Salantri began wrestling singles matches defeating Eric Perez, Johnny Parisi and The Freakin' Deacon during the next few weeks before losing to Mike Knox in a match to decide the number one contender to the DSW Heavyweight Championship on January 26, 2006. He and Taylor eventually appeared in a dark match on Monday Night Raw defeating Team Elite (Mike Knox & Derrick Neikirk) on February 6.

Within months of their debut, High Impact won the Tag Team titles in a championship tournament defeating Cocki Siaki & Bradley Jay, Team Elite and the Gymini in the tournament finals on May 18. During the next several months, he and Taylor would successfully defend the titles against The Bulldogs (Kid Kash & Jamie Noble) and Urban Assault. He, along with Mike and Tracy Taylor, appeared at Six Flags in a commercial for the supercard Park Slam on June 9.

In September, Salantri lost to Bradley Jay in a DSW title match. On October 5, 2006, lost the titles to the Untouchables. On October 19, 2006, he lost a singles title match to Bradley Jay. In their last appearance with the promotion, he and Taylor lost to WWE Tag Team Champions Gymini when Salantri was pinned by Jesse Gymini in January 2007.

=== Independents ===
Continuing to team with Taylor on the independent circuit, they would eventually return to the NWA wrestling in Georgia Championship Wrestling winning the GCW Tag Team Championship on April 18 before losing the titles on May 30. Several months later, he resurfaced in NWA Anarchy feuding with his former tag team partner Todd Sexton and eventually teamed with Andrew Pendelton III against Sexton and Wesley Grissom, losing to them in a televised match during mid-August.

He later formed an alliance with Melissa Coates and continued to taunt Sexton on Anarchy TV during the next several weeks although, at one point, he was later escorted from the NWA Arena after a storyline confrontation with promoter Jerry Palmer during an Anarchy TV taping on September 10. During an in ring interview with Coates on September 15, he was finally confronted by Grissom who was attacked by Salantri and Coates before Sexton ran them off.

== Championships and accomplishments ==
- Deep South Wrestling
  - DSW Tag Team Championship (1 time) - with Mike Taylor
- Great Championship Wrestling
  - GCW Tag Team Championship (1 time) - with Micah Taylor
- NWA Wildside
  - NWA Wildside Tag Team Championship (2 times) - with Todd Sexton
- Pro Wrestling Illustrated
  - Ranked No. 320 of the 500 best singles wrestlers in the PWI 500 in 2006
- Ultimate Pro Wrestling
  - Mat Wars Tournament (2003)
