= Texas Wrestling Academy =

American professional wrestling school

- Acronym: TWA
- Founded: 1999
- Defunct: 2001
- Headquarters: San Antonio, Texas
- Founder(s): Shawn Michaels; Rudy Boy Gonzalez; José Lothario; Ken Johnson
- Owner: Rudy Boy Gonzalez
- Parent: Shawn Michaels and Rudy Boy Gonzalez
- Formerly: Shawn Michaels Wrestling Academy
- Website: txwrestlingacademy.com

The Texas Wrestling Academy (formerly known as the Shawn Michaels Wrestling Academy) is a professional wrestling training school that was operated by Shawn Michaels and Rudy Boy Gonzalez. The school has produced many well-known wrestlers such as Bryan Danielson, Brian Kendrick, Paul London, Lance Cade, MASADA, Shawn Hernandez, Matt Bentley and Milano Collection A.T.

== History ==
After briefly retiring from active wrestling in 1998 after back surgery, Shawn Michaels opened the Shawn Michaels Wrestling Academy on April 5, 1999, with Ken Johnson, Jose Lothario and Rudy Boy Gonzalez.

They also started a professional wrestling promotion to go along with the school called the Texas Wrestling Alliance (TWA).

== Tribute show ==
A tribute to Lance Cade, who trained at the SMWA, took place on March 5, 2011, at the Texas Wrestling Academy gym in San Antonio, Texas. Cade died on August 13, 2010, as a result of accidental drug overdose.
