= Deep South Wrestling =

American professional wrestling promotion

- Acronym: DSW
- Founded: Original incarnation: February 12, 1986; Second incarnation: September 1, 2005; Current incarnation: February 26, 2021
- Defunct: Original incarnation: October 18, 1988; Second incarnation: October 11, 2007
- Style: American Wrestling
- Headquarters: Lovejoy, Georgia (1986–1988); McDonough, Georgia (2005–2007); Griffin, Georgia (2021–present)
- Founder: Jody Hamilton
- Owner(s): Jody Hamilton (1986–1988; 2005–2007); Bill Behrens (1986–1988); Nick Patrick (2021–present)
- Parent: Deep South Wrestling, LLC.
- Website: Deep South Wrestling on Myspace; Deep South Wrestling on Facebook

Deep South Wrestling (DSW) is an American independent professional wrestling promotion in the state of Georgia. Deep South worked in tandem with World Wrestling Entertainment (WWE) as a developmental territory from September 1, 2005, until April 18, 2007. Deep South was owned by Jody Hamilton, former director of the WCW Power Plant.

== First run (1986–1988) ==
Jody Hamilton and Bill Behrens founded Deep South Wrestling in 1986 as a wrestling promotion and training facility, setting their base of operations in Lovejoy, Georgia. They had ties with both the American Wrestling Association and the National Wrestling Alliance. After a career-ending back injury in October 1988, Hamilton folded the promotion and focused on his wrestling school, which by 1989, evolved into the WCW Power Plant.

== Second run (2005–2007) ==
In 2005, WWE decided to run an official developmental territory in the Atlanta, Georgia area and hired Hamilton to run the territory and resurrect the Deep South Wrestling promotion after seventeen years of inactivity and set their base of operations in nearby McDonough, Georgia.

Deep South Wrestling held their inaugural show under the WWE banner on September 1, 2005. Two months later, the promotion crowned Mike Mizanin as their first Deep South Heavyweight Champion. The promotion gained a timeslot on Comcast Sports South on Sunday nights at 11:30 p.m.

On July 9, 2006, the promotion debuted a live event at Six Flags Over Georgia in Austell, Georgia. DSW began holding live shows at venues other than Six Flags, starting in the nearby town of Griffin, Georgia. On May 18, High Impact (Mike Taylor & Tony Santarelli) won a tournament to crown the first Deep South Tag Team Champions. On October 18, 2006, Deep South Wrestling landed a television deal with MAVTV.

On April 18, 2007, WWE ended its relationship with Deep South. after Deep South had held its final event on April 12. Because of Deep South parting ways, talent not under WWE developmental contracts left the promotion. Those that remained under contract were reassigned to Ohio Valley Wrestling.

== Third run (2021–present) ==
In February 2021, Hamilton's son Nick Patrick revived Deep South Wrestling, with Griffin, Georgia, as its new base of operations for the promotion and its training facility. On August 3, 2021, DSW founder Jody Hamilton died at the age of 82.

== Champions ==
Championship	Champion(s)	Date won	Won from
DSW Heavyweight Champion	Najasism	June 30, 2025	Champion Prince Apollo and Jacob Johnson in a triple threat match
DSW Tag Team Champions	Dj Smoke and Stunt Marshall	March 23, 2025	Austin Towers and Jay Alpha Miller
DSW Brass Knuckles Champion	Luke Graham	1987	
DSW Junior Heavyweight Champion	Dewayne Bruce	1987	
DSW United States Champion	The Psycho	1987	
DSW Women's Champion	Gemma Jewels	June 29, 2025	Defeated Audrey Allen in decision match for reactivated title.

== Authority figures ==
Authority	Position	Date started	Date finished	Notes
Jody Hamilton	Owner	September 1, 2005	April 19, 2007	Hamilton assigned Krissy Vaine General Manager to DSU
Krissy Vaine	General manager	October 12, 2006	2007	Became Co-General Manager with Angel Williams
Krissy Vaine & Angel Williams	Co-General Manager	2007	April 18, 2007	Last General Managers when DSW was shut down
