= OVW Heavyweight Championship =

Professional wrestling championship

- The current OVW Heavyweight Championship belt (2012–present)

Details
- Promotion: Ohio Valley Wrestling
- Date established: August 17, 1997
- Current champion: Dustin Jackson
- Date won: July 19, 2026

Other names
- NWA-OVW Heavyweight Championship (1997–2001); OVW Heavyweight Championship (2001–present)
Statistics
- First champion: Trailer Park Trash
- Most reigns: Nick Dinsmore (10 reigns)
- Longest reign: Rocco Bellagio (322 days)
- Shortest reign: Rob Conway, Chet the Jett and Vladimir Kozlov (<1 day)

The OVW Heavyweight Championship is a professional wrestling World heavyweight championship owned by the Ohio Valley Wrestling (OVW) promotion. The original championship was designed and created in 1997 by Reggie Parks. The title was introduced on August 17, 1997, at an OVW live event, then known as the NWA-OVW Heavyweight Championship due to OVW's relationship with the National Wrestling Alliance (NWA) governing body. OVW eventually parted ways with the NWA in October 2001, and the title was renamed the OVW Heavyweight Championship. OVW later became a developmental territory for the World Wrestling Entertainment organization, but their partnership eventually ceased on February 7, 2008. The title has no known weight-limit, even though it is a heavyweight championship. The title has also went through almost 3 different versions in its current twenty-five year run. With The first being made by Reggie Parks in 1997, which was then retired and vacated in early 2012. The second version would then be made by Reggie Parks and Dave Millican for OVW. The current version however was designed and created by Top Rope Belts, and ended up being used from 2012 to the present day.

Title changes happen mostly at OVW-promoted events. The inaugural champion was a man known as Trailer Park Trash. His reign began on August 17, 1997, but ended in a vacancy for unknown reasons; it is also unknown how he became the first champion. Nick Dinsmore holds the record of most reigns, with ten. At 322 days, Rocco Bellagio's reign is the longest in the title's history. Rob Conway's fourth reign, Chet the Jett's second reign, and Vladimir Kozlov's only reign are all tied for the record of shortest reign in the title's history at less than one day each. Nick Dinsmore's combined ten reign lengths add up to 529 days—the most of any wrestler. The current champion is Dustin Jacson; he was given the title after then-champion Kal Herro attacked him, violating an agreement with OVW management. Overall, there have been 149 reigns shared between 81 wrestlers, with 15 vacancies. One of those vacancies was due to then-champion Matt Cappotelli being diagnosed with a malignant brain tumor, and thus he chose to vacate the championship.

== Title history ==
=== Names ===
Name	Years
NWA-OVW Heavyweight Championship	August 17, 1997 – 2001
OVW Heavyweight Championship	October 2001 – present

=== Reigns ===
Key
No.	Overall reign number
Reign	Reign number for the specific champion
Days	Number of days held
N/A	Unknown information
<1	Reign lasted less than a day
+	Current reign is changing daily

No.	Champion	Championship change			Reign statistics		Notes	Ref.
No.	Champion	Date	Event	Location	Reign	Days	Notes	Ref.
1	Trailer Park Trash	August 17, 1997	Live event	Jeffersonville, IN	1	76	Trailer Park Trash defeated Vic the Bruiser to become the inaugural champion.	
—	Vacated	November 1, 1997	—	—	—	—		
2	Bill Dundee	November 16, 1997	Live event	Jeffersonville, IN	1	7	Dundee won a battle royal to win the vacant championship.	
3	Rip Rogers	November 23, 1997	Live event	Jeffersonville, IN	1	192		
4	Nick Dinsmore	June 3, 1998	Live event	Jeffersonville, IN	1	7		
5	David C.	June 10, 1998	Live event	Jeffersonville, IN	1	25	David C. won the championship by forfeit.	
6	Doug Basham	July 5, 1998	Live event	Jeffersonville, IN	1	70		
7	Rip Rogers	September 13, 1998	Live event	Jeffersonville, IN	2	107		
8	Doug Basham	December 29, 1998	Live event	Louisville, KY	2	5		
9	Rip Rogers	January 3, 1999	Live event	Louisville, KY	3	30		
10	Rod Steele	February 2, 1999	Live event	Louisville, KY	1	75	Nick Dinsmore defeated Steele on February 7, 1999 at a live event, but returned the title to Steele after learning of outside interference during their encounter.	
11	Nick Dinsmore	April 18, 1999	Live event	Jeffersonville, IN	2	10		
12	Rob Conway	April 28, 1999	Live event	Jeffersonville, IN	1	9		
13	Nick Dinsmore	May 7, 1999	Live event	New Albany, IN	3	32		
14	Damaja	June 8, 1999	Live event	Louisville, KY	1	70		
15	Rob Conway	August 17, 1999	Live event	Louisville, KY	2	85		
16	Rico Constantino	November 10, 1999	Live event	Louisville, KY	1	46		
17	Flash Flanagan	December 26, 1999	Live event	Louisville, KY	1	42		
18	Rico Constantino	February 6, 2000	Live event	Louisville, KY	2	11		
19	Flash Flanagan	February 17, 2000	Live event	Jeffersonville, IN	2	47		
20	Damaja	April 4, 2000	Live event	Louisville, KY	2	50		
21	Nick Dinsmore	May 24, 2000	Live event	Jeffersonville, IN	4	45		
22	Flash Flanagan	July 8, 2000	Live event	Jeffersonville, IN	3	27		
23	Nick Dinsmore	August 4, 2000	Live event	Louisville, KY	5	33		
24	Rob Conway	September 6, 2000	Live event	Jeffersonville, IN	3	49		
25	Nick Dinsmore	October 25, 2000	Live event	Jeffersonville, IN	6	125		
26	Rico Constantino	February 27, 2001	Live event	Louisville, KY	3	36		
27	Flash Flanagan	April 4, 2001	Bluegrass Brawl	Louisville, KY	4	112		
28	Doug Basham	July 25, 2001	OVW TV Tapings	Jeffersonville, IN	3	126	OVW breaks away from the NWA in October 2001. The championship is renamed the OVW Heavyweight Championship.	
29	Leviathan	November 28, 2001	OVW TV Tapings	Jeffersonville, IN	1	84		
30	The Prototype	February 20, 2002	OVW TV Tapings	Jeffersonville, IN	1	84		
31	Nova	May 15, 2002	Live event	Jeffersonville, IN	1	175		
32	Damaja	November 6, 2002	Live event	Louisville, KY	3	105		
33	Nick Dinsmore	February 19, 2003	Live event	Louisville, KY	7	46		
34	Doug Basham	April 6, 2003	OVW TV Tapings	Louisville, KY	4	115		
35	Damaja	July 30, 2003	OVW TV Tapings	Louisville, KY	4	14	This was a Loser Leaves Town match.	
36	Rob Conway	August 13, 2003	OVW TV Tapings	Louisville, KY	4	<1		
37	Johnny Jeter	August 13, 2003	OVW TV Tapings	Louisville, KY	1	63		
38	Mark Magnus	October 15, 2003	OVW TV Tapings	Louisville, KY	1	56		
—	Vacated	December 10, 2003	—	—	—	—	The championship was vacated due to Mark Magnus being pinned by both Nick Dinsmore and Johnny Jeter in a three-way match on December 3.	
39	Nick Dinsmore	January 7, 2004	OVW TV Tapings	Louisville, KY	8	98	Dinsmore defeated Johnny Jeter to win the vacant championship.	
40	Matt Morgan	April 14, 2004	OVW TV Tapings	Louisville, KY	1	182		
41	Chris Cage	October 13, 2004	OVW TV Tapings	Louisville, KY	1	49		
42	Chad Toland	December 1, 2004	OVW TV Tapings	Louisville, KY	1	7		
43	Elijah Burke	December 8, 2004	OVW TV Tapings	Louisville, KY	1	126		
44	Matt Morgan	April 13, 2005	OVW TV Tapings	Louisville, KY	2	14		
45	Brent Albright	April 27, 2005	OVW TV Tapings	Louisville, KY	1	98		
46	Johnny Jeter	August 3, 2005	OVW TV Tapings	Louisville, KY	2	98		
47	Matt Cappotelli	November 9, 2005	OVW TV Tapings	Louisville, KY	1	91		
—	Vacated	February 8, 2006	Live event	Louisville, KY	—	—	Matt Cappotelli vacated the championship after announcing that he had a brain tumor.	
48	Brent Albright	March 1, 2006	OVW TV Tapings	Louisville, KY	2	63	Albright defeated CM Punk in a tournament finals to become the new champion.	
49	CM Punk	May 3, 2006	OVW TV Tapings	Louisville, KY	1	119	This was a strap match	
50	Chet the Jett	August 30, 2006	OVW TV Tapings	Louisville, KY	1	56		
51	Jacob Duncan	October 25, 2006	OVW TV Tapings	Louisville, KY	1	49		
52	Chet the Jett	December 13, 2006	OVW TV Tapings	Louisville, KY	2	<1		
53	Paul Burchill	December 13, 2006	OVW TV Tapings	Louisville, KY	1	66		
54	Cody Runnels	February 17, 2007	Live event	Elizabethtown, KY	1	1		
55	Paul Burchill	February 18, 2007	Live event	Louisville, KY	2	24		
56	Aaron Stevens	March 14, 2007	Live event	Louisville, KY	1	56		
57	Paul Burchill	May 9, 2007	Live event	Louisville, KY	3	14		
—	Vacated	May 23, 2007	Live event	Louisville, KY	—	—	The championship was vacated after a double pin in a contest between Paul Burchill and Idol Stevens.	
58	Jay Bradley	June 1, 2007	Live event	Louisville, KY	1	26	Bradley defeated Paul Burchill and Aaron Stevens in a three-way match to win the vacant championship.	
59	Paul Burchill	June 27, 2007	Live event	Louisville, KY	4	31		
60	Vladimir Kozlov	July 28, 2007	Live event	Elizabethtown, KY	1	<1		
61	Michael Washington Kruel	July 28, 2007	Live event	Elizabethtown, KY	1	130	Pinned at backstage	
62	Matt Sydal	December 5, 2007	Live event	Louisville, KY	1	70	Sydal is the last OVW Heavyweight Champion while OVW is a World Wrestling Entertainment (WWE) developmental territory.	
63	Jay Bradley	February 13, 2008	Live event	Louisville, KY	2	7	Bradley became the first OVW Heavyweight Champion since OVW and WWE parted ways.	
64	Nick Dinsmore	February 20, 2008	Live event	Louisville, KY	9	126		
65	Anthony Bravado	June 25, 2008	Live event	Louisville, KY	1	115		
66	Ryback	October 18, 2008	Live event	Louisville, KY	1	14		
67	Anthony Bravado	November 1, 2008	Live event	Louisville, KY	2	28		
68	Aaron Stevens	November 29, 2008	Live event	Louisville, KY	2	49		
69	Vaughn Lilas	January 17, 2009	Live event	Louisville, KY	1	21		
70	Apoc	February 7, 2009	Live event	Louisville, KY	1	77		
71	Vaughn Lilas	April 25, 2009	Live event	Louisville, KY	2	22		
72	Apoc	May 17, 2009	Live event	Louisville, KY	2	62		
73	Low Rider	July 18, 2009	Live event	Louisville, KY	1	172		
74	Moose	January 6, 2010	OVW TV Tapings	Louisville, KY	1	52		
—	Vacated	February 27, 2010	—	—	—	—	Moose was stripped of the championship due to attacking officials.	
75	Brent Wellington	February 27, 2010	Live event	Louisville, KY	1	91	Wellington won a battle royal to win the vacant championship.	
76	Mike Mondo	May 29, 2010	Live event	Louisville, KY	1	18		
77	James Thomas	June 16, 2010	OVW TV Tapings	Louisville, KY	2	45	Thomas is formerly known as Moose.	
78	Low Rider	July 31, 2010	Live event	Louisville, KY	2	161		
79	Cliff Compton	January 8, 2011	Live event	Louisville, KY	1	56	This was a three-way match, also involving Mike Mondo.	
80	Mike Mondo	March 5, 2011	Live event	Louisville, KY	2	60	This was a three-way ladder match, also involving Low Rider.	
—	Vacated	May 4, 2011	OVW TV Tapings	Louisville, KY	—	—	The championship was vacated after Mike Mondo attacked OVW president Danny Davis.	
81	Cliff Compton	May 14, 2011	Live event	Louisville, KY	2	11	This was a brass knuckles on a pole match against Mike Mondo with Danny Davis served as the special guest referee.	
82	Elvis Pridemoore	May 25, 2011	OVW TV Tapings	Louisville, KY	1	7		
—	Vacated	June 1, 2011	OVW TV Tapings	Louisville, KY	—	—	Pridemoore vacated the championship after finding out that he had won it due to outside interference from Mike Mondo.	
83	Jason Wayne	July 1, 2011	OVW TV Tapings	Louisville, KY	1	117	Wayne defeated Mike Mondo in a tournament final to win the vacant championship.	
84	Nick Dinsmore	October 26, 2011	OVW TV Tapings	Louisville, KY	10	7		
85	Rudy Switchblade	November 2, 2011	OVW TV Tapings	Louisville, KY	1	122	Switchblade defeated Adam Revolver, James Thomas, Jason Wayne, Mike Mondo, Nick Dinsmore, Rocco Bellagio and Ted McNaler and in an Eight Man Melee.	
86	Johnny Spade	March 3, 2012	Saturday Night Special	Louisville, KY	1	70		
87	Rob Terry	May 12, 2012	Saturday Night Special	Louisville, KY	1	46		
—	Vacated	June 27, 2012	OVW TV Tapings	Louisville, KY	—	—	OVW Board of Directors member Ken Wayne vacated all OVW championships.	
88	Johnny Spade	July 7, 2012	OVW Saturday Night Special	Louisville, KY	2	67	Spade defeated Rob Terry in the finals of a ten men gauntlet match to win the vacant championship.	
89	Crimson	September 12, 2012	OVW TV Tapings	Louisville, KY	1	80		
90	Rob Terry	December 1, 2012	OVW Saturday Night Special	Louisville, KY	2	60		
91	Doug Williams	January 30, 2013	OVW TV Tapings	Louisville, KY	1	70		
92	Jamin Olivencia	April 10, 2013	OVW Saturday Night Special	Louisville, KY	1	238		
—	Vacated	December 4, 2013	N/A	Louisville, KY	—	—	The championship was vacated by OVW owner Danny Davis over inappropriate actions on OVW TV.	
93	Jamin Olivencia	December 7, 2013	OVW Saturday Night Special	Louisville, KY	2	28	Olivencia defeated Johnny Spade to win the vacant championship.	
94	Marcus Anthony	January 4, 2014	OVW Saturday Night Special	Louisville, KY	1	126		
95	Jamin Olivencia	May 10, 2014	OVW Saturday Night Special	Louisville, KY	3	56		
96	Marcus Anthony	July 5, 2014	OVW Saturday Night Special	Louisville, KY	2	28	this was a Last Man Standing match.	
97	Melvin Maximus	August 2, 2014	OVW Saturday Night Special	Louisville, KY	1	63		
98	Cliff Compton	October 4, 2014	OVW Saturday Night Special	Louisville, KY	3	63	This was a three-way match, also including Marcus Anthony.	
99	Adam Revolver	December 6, 2014	OVW Saturday Night Special	Louisville, KY	1	63		
100	Mohamad Ali Vaez	February 7, 2015	OVW Saturday Night Special	Louisville, KY	1	81		
101	Eddie Diamond	April 29, 2015	OVW TV Tapings	Louisville, KY	1	86		
102	Chris Silvio	July 24, 2015	OVW Friday Night Fights 2	Louisville, KY	1	134		
103	Ryan Howe	December 5, 2015	OVW Saturday Night Special	Louisville, KY	1	4		
104	Rob Conway	December 9, 2015	OVW TV Tapings	Louisville, KY	5	24		
105	Ryan Howe	January 2, 2016	OVW Saturday Night Special	Louisville, KY	2	77		
106	Devin Driscoll	March 19, 2016	Live event	Elizabethtown, KY	1	28		
—	Vacated	April 16, 2016	Live event	Elizabethtown, KY	—	—	The championship was vacated by OVW founder Danny Davis.	
107	Big Jon	April 16, 2016	Live event	Elizabethtown, KY	1	28	Jon defeated Rocco Bellagio to win the vacant championship.	
108	Rocco Bellagio	May 14, 2016	OVW Saturday Night Special	Louisville, KY	1	322	This was a No Holds Barred match.	
109	Big Jon	April 1, 2017	OVW Saturday Night Special	Louisville, KY	2	91	This was a steel cage match.	
110	Adam Revolver	July 1, 2017	OVW Saturday Night Special	Louisville, KY	2	63	Michael Hayes served as the special guest referee.	
111	Tyler Matrix	September 2, 2017	OVW Saturday Night Special	Louisville, KY	1	63		
112	Michael Hayes	November 4, 2017	OVW Saturday Night Special	Louisville, KY	1	102	This was Hayes War Games cash in match.	
113	Randy Royal	February 14, 2018	OVW TV Tapings	Louisville, KY	1	17		
114	Michael Hayes	March 3, 2018	OVW Saturday Night Special	Louisville, KY	2	126	This was a three-way elimination match, also including Chris Silvio.	
115	Amon	July 7, 2018	OVW Saturday Night Special	Louisville, KY	1	18	This was a casket match.	
116	Abyss	July 25, 2018	OVW TV Tapings	Louisville, KY	1	7	Abyss became champion after Amon gave him the championship.	
—	Vacated	August 1, 2018	OVW TV Tapings	Louisville, KY	—	—	The championship vacated by Dean Hill.	
117	Abyss	October 10, 2018	OVW 1000	Louisville, KY	2	112	Abyss defeated Justin Smooth in a tournament final to win the vacant championship.	
118	Tony Gunn	January 30, 2019	OVW TV Tapings	Louisville, KY	1	77		
119	Dimes	April 17, 2019	OVW TV Tapings	Louisville, KY	1	7	This was a gauntlet match also for the OVW Television Championship including Amon, Brandon Wolfe, Drew Hernandez and William Lutz.	
120	Justin Smooth	April 24, 2019	OVW TV Tapings	Louisville, KY	1	21	This was a three-way match, also including Amon.	
121	Michael Hayes	May 15, 2019	OVW TV Tapings	Louisville, KY	3	17	The championship was awarded to Hayes by Dean Hill after Smooth got disqualified at the Saturday Night Special.	
122	Justin Smooth	June 1, 2019	OVW Saturday Night Special	Louisville, KY	2	245	This was a No Disqualification match.	
123	Maximus Khan	February 1, 2020	OVW Saturday Night Special	Louisville, KY	1	35	This was a 3-Way Dance, also including Ca$h Flo.	
124	Tony Gunn	March 7, 2020	OVW Saturday Night Special	Louisville, KY	2	273		
125	Brian Pillman Jr.	December 5, 2020	OVW Christmas Chaos	Louisville, KY	1	28	This was a Steel Cage Match.	
—	Vacated	January 2, 2021	N/A	N/A	—	—	Pillman vacated the championship due to his AEW commitments.	
126	Omar Amir	January 9, 2021	OVW Nightmare Rumble 2021	Louisville, KY	1	117	Won the 2021 Nightmare Rumble to become the new OVW Heavyweight Champion.	
127	Ca$h Flo	May 6, 2021	OVW TV Taping	Louisville, KY	1	51		
128	Omar Amir	June 26, 2021	Saturday Night Special - Chained Carnage 2021	Louisville, KY	2	103	This was a Chained Carnage match.	
—	Vacated	October 7, 2021	N/A	N/A	—	—		
129	Ryan Howe	October 21, 2021	OVW TV Tapings	Louisville, KY	3	224	This was 20-man battle royal for the vacant championship.	
130	Omar Amir	June 2, 2022	OVW TV: All Systems Go	Louisville, KY	3	35		
131	Jack Vaughn	July 7, 2022	OVW TV Tapings	Louisville, KY	1	35		
132	Omar Amir	August 11, 2022	OVW TV Tapings	Louisville, KY	4	16		
133	James Storm	August 27, 2022	OVW The Big One	Louisville, KY	1	47		
134	Ca$h Flo	October 13, 2022	OVW TV Tapings	Louisville, KY	2	42	This match was also for Storm's OVW National Heavyweight Championship.	
135	Mahabali Shera	November 24, 2022	OVW TV Tapings	Louisville, KY	1	210		
136	Ca$h Flo	June 22, 2023	OVW TV Tapings	Louisville, KY	3	35		
137	Jack Vaughn	July 27, 2023	OVW TV Tapings	Louisville, KY	2	133		
138	Tony Gunn	December 7, 2023	OVW TV Tapings	Louisville, KY	3	49	nZo served as the special guest referee.	
139	Jack Vaughn	January 25, 2024	OVW TV Tapings	Louisville, KY	3	50		
140	Tony Gunn	March 16, 2024	OVW March Mayhem	Louisville, KY	4	12	This was a Double Jeopardy Tag Match between the team of Gunn and Luke Kurtis and the team of Vaughn and OVW National Heavyweight Champion EC3, where if either Vaughn or EC3 were pinned, the man who pinned them would win their respective title. Gunn pinned Vaughn.	
141	Luke Kurtis	March 28, 2024	OVW TV Tapings	Louisville, KY	1	35		
142	Tony Evans	May 2, 2024	OVW Double Crossed	Louisville, KY	1	28		
143	Crixus	May 30, 2024	OVW TV Tapings	Louisville, KY	1	105		
—	Vacated	September 12, 2024	N/A	N/A	—	—		
144	Ca$h Flo	September 12, 2024	OVW TV Tapings	Louisville, KY	4	21	This was a gauntlet match that also involved AJZ, Dalton McKenzie and Tony Gunn.	
145	Mt. Khadeem	October 3, 2024	OVW TV Tapings	Louisville, KY	1	252		
—	Vacated	June 12, 2025	OVW TV Tapings	Louisville, KY	—	—	Khadeem announced unforeseen health concerns and vacated the title.	
146	Kal Herro	July 1, 2025	OVW Independence Rage	Louisville, KY	1	173	Herro defeated Crixus in a tournament final for the vacant championship.	
147	Dustin Jackson	December 11, 2025	OVW Rise	Louisville, KY	1	157	Kal Herro was forced to forfeit the title to Dustin Jackson after attacking him, violating an agreement with OVW management.	
148	Jay DeNiro	May 17, 2026	OVW Collision Course	Louisville, KY	1	63		
149	Dustin Jackson	July 19, 2026	OVW Independence Rage 2026	Louisville, KY	2	114+		

== Combined reigns ==
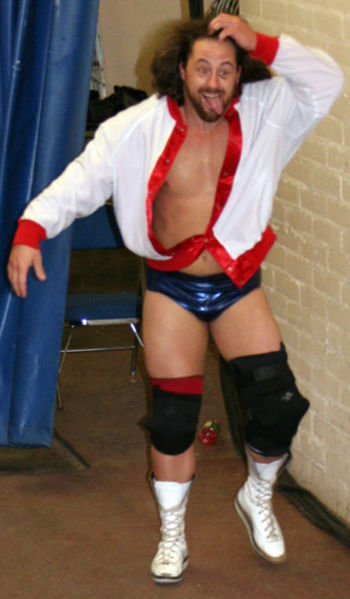
Nick Dinsmore (pictured under his Eugene persona), is a record ten-time champion and holds the record for longest combined days as champion, with 529

†	Indicates the current champion(s)
¤	The exact length of at least one title reign is uncertain, so the shortest possible length is used.
<1	Indicates that the combined total is less than one day.

Rank	Wrestler	No. of reigns	Combined days
1	Nick Dinsmore	10	529
2	Tony Gunn	4	411
3	Low Rider	2	333
4	Rip Rogers	3	329
5	Jamin Olivencia	3	322
5	Rocco Bellagio	1	322
7	Doug Basham	4	316
8	Ryan Howe	3	305
9	Dustin Jackson †	2	271+
10	Omar Amir	4	271
11	Justin Smooth	2	266
12	Mt. Khadeem	1	252
13	Michael Hayes	3	245
14	Damaja	4	239
15	Flash Flanagan	4	228
16	Jack Vaughn	3	218
17	Mahabali Shera	1	210
18	Matt Morgan	2	196
19	Nova	1	175
20	Kal Herro	1	173
21	Rob Conway	5	167
22	Brent Albright	2	161
22	Johnny Jeter	2	161
24	Marcus Anthony	2	154
25	Ca$h Flo	4	149
26	Anthony Bravado	2	143
27	Apoc	2	139
28	Johnny Spade	2	137
29	Paul Burchill	4	135
30	Chris Silvio	1	134
31	Cliff Compton	3	130
31	Michael Washington Kruel	1	130
33	Adam Revolver	2	126
33	Elijah Burke	1	126
35	Rudy Switchblade	1	122
36	Abyss	2	119
36	Big Jon	2	119
36	CM Punk	1	119
39	Jason Wayne	1	117
40	Rob Terry	2	106
41	Aaron Stevens	2	105
41	Crixus	1	105
43	Moose/James Thomas	2	97
44	Rico Constantino	3	93
45	Brent Wellington	1	91
45	Matt Cappotelli	1	91
47	Eddie Diamond	1	86
48	Leviathan	1	84
48	The Prototype	1	84
50	Mohamad Ali Vaez	1	81
51	Crimson	1	80
52	Mike Mondo	2	78
53	Trailer Park Trash	1	76
54	Rod Steele	1	75
55	Doug Williams	1	70
55	Matt Sydal	1	70
57	Jay DeNiro	1	63
57	Melvin Maximus	1	63
57	Tyler Matrix	1	63
60	Chet the Jett	1	56
60	Mark Magnus	1	56
62	Chris Cage	1	49
62	Jacob Duncan	1	49
64	James Storm	1	47
65	Vaughn Lilas	2	43
66	Luke Kurtis	1	35
66	Maximus Khan	1	35
68	Jay Bradley	2	33
69	Brian Pillman Jr.	1	28
69	Devin Driscoll	1	28
69	Tony Evans	1	28
72	David C.	1	25
73	Amon	1	18
74	Randy Royal	1	17
75	Ryback	1	14
76	Bill Dundee	1	7
76	Chad Toland	1	7
76	Dimes	1	7
76	Elvis Pridemoore	1	7
80	Cody Runnels	1	1
81	Vladimir Kozlov	1	<1

== See also ==
- OVW National Heavyweight Championship
- OVW Southern Tag Team Championship
- OVW Television Championship
- OVW Women's Championship
