= OVW Television Championship =

Professional wrestling championship

Details
- Promotion: Ohio Valley Wrestling
- Date established: January 26, 2005
- Date retired: October 22, 2019
Statistics
- First champion: Brent Albright
- Final champion: AJZ
- Most reigns: Jamin Olivencia and Ali/Mohamad Ali Vaez (8 reigns)
- Longest reign: Seth Skyfire (168 days)
- Shortest reign: Jamin Olivencia (<1 day) and David Lee Lorenze III (<1 day)
- Oldest champion: Flash Flanagan (39 years old)
- Youngest champion: Corey Storm (18 years old)
- Heaviest champion: Melvin Maximus (145 kg)
- Lightest champion: Rockstar Spud (57 kg)

The OVW Television Championship was the secondary championship of Ohio Valley Wrestling (OVW), started on January 5, 2005. When the title was originally conceived, the champion defended against randomly selected opponents, with the winner receiving a check for $1000. The title became represented by a large trophy in the summer of 2005, before being changed to a traditional championship belt in the spring of 2006.

The inaugural champion was Brent Albright who defeated Seth Skyfire to win the championship on January 26, 2005. Jamin Olivencia holds the record for most reigns, with eight. At 168 days, Seth Skyfire's first reign is the longest in the title's history. David Lee Lorenze III, Jamin Olivencia and Mohamad Ali Vaez share the record for shortest reign in the title's history at less than a day. AJZ was the final champion, in his first reign. Overall, there have been 143 reigns shared among 79 wrestlers, with 12 vacancies.

== Title history ==
Key
No.	Overall reign number
Reign	Reign number for the specific champion
Days	Number of days held
N/A	Unknown information
<1	Reign lasted less than a day

No.	Champion	Championship change			Reign statistics		Notes	Ref.
No.	Champion	Date	Event	Location	Reign	Days	Notes	Ref.
1	Brent Albright	January 26, 2005	OVW TV Tapings	Louisville, Kentucky	1	112	Brent Albright defeated Seth Skyfire to become the inaugural champion	
—	Vacated	May 18, 2005	OVW TV Tapings	Louisville, Kentucky	—	—	Title declared vacant, after Brent Albright won the OVW Heavyweight Championship	
2	Deuce Shade	June 8, 2005	OVW TV Tapings	Louisville, Kentucky	1	14	Defeated Ken Doane in a tournament finals	
3	Ken Doane	June 22, 2005	OVW TV Tapings	Louisville, Kentucky	1	140		
4	CM Punk	November 9, 2005	OVW TV Tapings	Louisville, Kentucky	1	56		
5	Aaron Stevens	January 4, 2006	OVW TV Tapings	Louisville, Kentucky	1	63	This was originally a three–way match between CM Punk, Ken Doane and Brent Albright. Doane was injured during the match, which led to Stevens replace him	
6	Seth Skyfire	March 8, 2006	OVW TV Tapings	Louisville, Kentucky	1	168		
7	Charles Evans	August 23, 2006	OVW TV Tapings	Louisville, Kentucky	1	49		
8	Devin Driscoll	October 11, 2006	OVW TV Tapings	Louisville, Kentucky	1	21		
9	Charles Evans	November 1, 2006	OVW TV Tapings	Louisville, Kentucky	2	14		
10	El Aero Fuego (Formerly known as Seth Skyfire)	November 15, 2006	OVW TV Tapings	Louisville, Kentucky	2	49		
11	Eddie Kraven & Mike Kruel	January 3, 2007	OVW TV Tapings	Louisville, Kentucky	1	21	Kraven's partner in Bad Kompany, Mike Kruel, also defended the title for Kraven during this reign, utilizing the Freebird Rule	
12	Boris Alexiev	January 24, 2007	OVW TV Tapings	Louisville, Kentucky	1	14	Defeated Mike Kruel	
13	Mike Kruel	February 7, 2007	OVW TV Tapings	Louisville, Kentucky	2	35		
14	Boris Alexiev	March 14, 2007	OVW TV Tapings	Louisville, Kentucky	2	3		
15	Shawn Spears	March 17, 2007	OVW TV Tapings	Cincinnati, Ohio	1	111		
16	Cody Runnels	July 6, 2007	OVW TV Tapings	Louisville, Kentucky	1	7		
17	Shawn Spears	July 13, 2007	OVW TV Tapings	Louisville, Kentucky	2	68		
18	Ted McNaler	September 19, 2007	OVW TV Tapings	Louisville, Kentucky	1	35		
19	Shawn Spears	October 24, 2007	OVW TV Tapings	Louisville, Kentucky	3	7		
20	Colt Cabana	October 31, 2007	OVW TV Tapings	Louisville, Kentucky	1	14		
21	James Curtis	November 14, 2007	OVW TV Tapings	Louisville, Kentucky	1	98		
22	Jamin Olivencia	February 20, 2008	OVW TV Tapings	Louisville, Kentucky	1	21	Became the first OVW Television Champion since OVW and WWE parted ways	
23	Joey Matthews	March 12, 2008	OVW TV Tapings	Louisville, Kentucky	1	35		
24	Tommy McNaler	April 16, 2008	OVW TV Tapings	Louisville, Kentucky	1	49		
25	J.D. Michaels	June 4, 2008	OVW TV Tapings	Louisville, Kentucky	1	74		
—	Vacated	August 17, 2008	OVW TV Tapings	Louisville, Kentucky	—	—	Title held up when one referee saw J.D. Michaels pin Rudy Switchblade and one referee saw Rudy Switchblade pin J.D. Michaels	
26	Rudy Switchblade	August 27, 2008	OVW TV Tapings	Louisville, Kentucky	1	49	Defeated JD Michaels in a 15 Foot Pole Match	
27	Jamin Olivencia	October 15, 2008	OVW TV Tapings	Louisville, Kentucky	2	<1	Title forfeited by Switchblade to Jamin Olivencia due to an injury sustained by J.D. Michaels	
28	Igotta Brewski	October 15, 2008	OVW TV Tapings	Louisville, Kentucky	1	42		
29	Outlaw	November 26, 2008	OVW TV Tapings	Louisville, Kentucky	1	49	Outlaw won by forfeit when Brewski couldn't compete due to an attack backstage	
30	Johnny Punch	January 14, 2009	OVW TV Tapings	Louisville, Kentucky	1	21		
31	Mike Mondo	February 4, 2009	OVW TV Tapings	Louisville, Kentucky	1	91		
32	Jamin Olivencia	May 6, 2009	OVW TV Tapings	Charlestown, Indiana	3	7	This was at a non televised event	
33	El Rojo Uno	May 13, 2009	OVW TV Tapings	Louisville, Kentucky	1	28		
34	Jamin Olivencia	June 10, 2009	OVW TV Tapings	Louisville, Kentucky	4	42		
35	Brent Wellington	July 22, 2009	OVW Futureshock	Louisville, Kentucky	1	49	This was contested in a Hair vs. Title match	
36	Moose	September 9, 2009	OVW TV Tapings	Louisville, Kentucky	1	7		
—	Vacated	September 16, 2009	OVW TV Tapings	Louisville, Kentucky	—	—	Moose stripped of title after repeated interferences by Tilo and Taryn Shay	
37	Kamikaze Kid	November 25, 2009	OVW TV Tapings	Louisville, Kentucky	1	63	Defeated Shiloh in a tournament finals	
38	Asher Knight	January 27, 2010	OVW Surviving the Steel	Louisville, Kentucky	1	7	This was contested in a Steel Cage match	
39	Kamikaze Kid	February 3, 2010	OVW TV Tapings	Louisville, Kentucky	2	14	Defeated Asher Knight and Shiloh in a three–way match	
40	Shiloh Jonze	February 17, 2010	OVW TV Tapings	Louisville, Kentucky	1	7		
41	Kamikaze Kid	February 24, 2010	OVW TV Tapings	Louisville, Kentucky	3	72	Title was reverted to Kamikaze Kid because the referee of the match wasn't licensed to be a referee in Kentucky	
42	Jamin Olivencia	May 7, 2010	OVW TV Tapings	Louisville, Kentucky	5	28		
43	Ali	June 4, 2010	OVW TV Tapings	Louisville, Kentucky	1	103		
44	The Metal Master	September 15, 2010	OVW TV Tapings	Louisville, Kentucky	1	49		
45	Mohamad Ali Vaez	November 3, 2010	OVW TV Tapings	Louisville, Kentucky	2	38	Formerly known as Ali	
46	Alex Silva	December 11, 2010	OVW Saturday Night Special	Louisville, Kentucky	1	46		
47	Mohamad Ali Vaez	January 26, 2011	OVW TV Tapings	Louisville, Kentucky	3	28		
48	Rudy Switchblade	February 23, 2011	OVW TV Tapings	Louisville, Kentucky	2	38		
49	Mohamad Ali Vaez	April 2, 2011	OVW Saturday Night Special	Louisville, Kentucky	4	42		
50	Jamin Olivencia	May 14, 2011	OVW Saturday Night Special	Louisville, Kentucky	6	4		
51	Rudy Switchblade	May 18, 2011	OVW TV Tapings	Louisville, Kentucky	3	63	This was a Triple Threat match also including Mohamad Ali Vaez	
52	Paredyse (Formerly known as Kamikaze Kid)	July 20, 2011	OVW TV Tapings	Louisville, Kentucky	4	56		
53	Adam Revolver	September 14, 2011	OVW TV Tapings	Louisville, Kentucky	1	7		
54	Jason Wayne	September 21, 2011	OVW TV Tapings	Louisville, Kentucky	1	14	Jason Wayne defeated Adam Revolver in which both Television and OVW Heavyweight Championship were on the line	
55	Rocco Bellagio	October 5, 2011	OVW TV Tapings	Louisville, Kentucky	1	35		
56	Alex Silva	November 9, 2011	OVW TV Tapings	Louisville, Kentucky	2	7	Became the first OVW Television Champion since OVW became the developmental territory to TNA Wrestling	
57	Adam Revolver	November 16, 2011	OVW TV Tapings	Louisville, Kentucky	2	21		
58	Ted McNaler	December 7, 2011	OVW TV Tapings	Louisville, Kentucky	2	14		
59	Christopher Silvio	December 21, 2011	OVW TV Tapings	Louisville, Kentucky	1	119		
60	Mohamad Ali Vaez	April 18, 2012	OVW TV Tapings	Louisville, Kentucky	5	3		
61	Rob Terry	April 21, 2012	N/A	Rio de Janeiro, Brazil	1	4	Title match never actually took place and was made up by The Family so Vaez wouldn't have to face Christopher Silvio in a rematch	
62	Mohamad Ali Vaez	April 25, 2012	OVW TV Tapings	Louisville, Kentucky	6	38	Terry successfully defended the title against Christopher Silvio and then laid down allowing Vaez to win the title back	
63	Jamin Olivencia	June 2, 2012	OVW Saturday Night Special	Louisville, Kentucky	7	4		
64	Mohamad Ali Vaez	June 6, 2012	OVW TV Tapings	Louisville, Kentucky	7	<1		
—	Vacated	June 6, 2012	OVW TV Tapings	Louisville, Kentucky	—	—	Vaez was stripped of the title by OVW Board of Directors member Ken Wayne, after the match due to referee Chris Sharpe helping Vaez win. OVW recognizes this as an official title change and reign for Vaez	
65	Mohamad Ali Vaez	July 7, 2012	OVW Saturday Night Special	Louisville, Kentucky	8	18	Defeated Flash Flanagan to win the vacant title	
66	Tony Gunn	July 25, 2012	OVW TV Tapings	Louisville, Kentucky	1	14	Won the title by forfeit after Rob Terry attacked Vaez	
67	Ryan Howe	August 8, 2012	OVW TV Tapings	Louisville, Kentucky	1	35	This was contested in a three–way match, also involving Rob Terry	
68	Alex Silva	September 12, 2012	OVW TV Tapings	Louisville, Kentucky	3	35		
69	Cliff Compton	October 17, 2012	OVW TV Tapings	Louisville, Kentucky	1	18		
—	Vacated	November 4, 2012	OVW TV Tapings	Louisville, Kentucky	—	—	OVW Board of Directors stripped Compton of title due to being unable to defend due to a foot injury	
70	Joe Coleman	November 7, 2012	OVW TV Tapings	Louisville, Kentucky	1	24	Defeated James Thomas to win the vacant title	
71	Jamin Olivencia	December 1, 2012	OVW Saturday Night Special	Louisville, Kentucky	8	35	This was a no disqualifications match	
72	Cliff Compton	January 5, 2013	OVW Saturday Night Special	Louisville, Kentucky	2	67	This was a Ladder match	
73	Rockstar Spud	March 13, 2013	OVW TV Tapings	Louisville, Kentucky	1	59		
74	Randy Royal	May 11, 2013	OVW War is Necessary	Louisville, Kentucky	1	53		
75	Dylan Bostic	July 3, 2013	OVW TV Tapings	Louisville, Kentucky	1	31		
76	Flash Flanagan	August 3, 2013	OVW Saturday Night Special	Louisville, Kentucky	1	39	Defeated Dylan Bostic and Rudy Switchblade	
77	Elijah Burke	September 11, 2013	OVW TV Tapings	Louisville, Kentucky	1	24		
78	Shiloh Jonze	October 5, 2013	OVW Saturday Night Special	Louisville, Kentucky	2	46		
79	Paredyse	November 20, 2013	OVW TV Tapings	Louisville, Kentucky	5	45		
80	Melvin Maximus	January 4, 2014	OVW Saturday Night Special	Louisville, Kentucky	1	130		
81	Adam Revolver	May 14, 2014	OVW TV Tapings	Louisville, Kentucky	3	7		
82	Melvin Maximus	May 21, 2014	OVW TV Tapings	Louisville, Kentucky	2	21		
83	Adam Revolver	June 11, 2014	OVW TV Tapings	Louisville, Kentucky	4	52		
84	Michael Hayes	August 2, 2014	OVW Saturday Night Special	Louisville, Kentucky	1	18	This was a Falls Count Anywhere match	
85	Adam Revolver	August 20, 2014	OVW TV Tapings	Louisville, Kentucky	5	17		
86	Michael Hayes	September 6, 2014	OVW Saturday Night Special	Louisville, Kentucky	2	32	This was a Submission match	
87	Chris Silvio	October 8, 2014	OVW TV Tapings	Louisville, Kentucky	2	24		
88	Michael Hayes	November 1, 2014	OVW Saturday Night Special	Louisville, Kentucky	3	49		
89	Dapper Dan	December 20, 2014	OVW TV Tapings	Louisville, Kentucky	1	49		
90	Rump Thump	February 7, 2015	OVW Saturday Night Special	Louisville, Kentucky	1	18	This was a No Count outs match	
91	Adam Revolver	February 25, 2015	OVW TV Tapings	Louisville, Kentucky	6	38		
92	Ryan Howe	April 4, 2015	Saturday Night Special	Louisville, Kentucky	2	35		
93	Adam Revolver	May 9, 2015	Saturday Night Special	Louisville, Kentucky	7	18		
—	Vacated	May 27, 2015	OVW TV Tapings	Louisville, Kentucky	—	—	Vacated by Danny Davis after Revolver grabbed Jessie Belle	
94	Ryan Howe	June 6, 2015	Saturday Night Special	Louisville, Kentucky	3	18	Defeated Adam Revolver in a Last Man Standing Match for the vacant title	
95	Randy Royal	June 24, 2015	OVW TV Tapings	Louisville, Kentucky	2	21		
96	Dylan Bostic	July 15, 2015	OVW TV Tapings	Louisville, Kentucky	2	7		
—	Vacated	July 22, 2015	OVW TV Tapings	Louisville, Kentucky	—	—	Vacated when Bostic suffered leg injury	
97	Randy Royal	July 22, 2015	OVW TV Tapings	Louisville, Kentucky	3	77	Defeated Eric Locker and Adam Wylde to win the vacant title	
98	Mitch Huff	October 7, 2015	OVW TV Tapings	Louisville, Kentucky	1	21		
99	Devin Driscoll	October 28, 2015	OVW TV Tapings	Louisville, Kentucky	2	129		
100	Big Jon	March 5, 2016	Saturday Night Special	Louisville, Kentucky	1	46		
—	Vacated	April 20, 2016	OVW TV Tapings	Louisville, Kentucky	—	—	Vacated after Big Jon won the Heavyweight title	
101	Bud Dwight	May 14, 2016	Saturday Night Special	Louisville, Kentucky	1	18	Defeated Tony Gunn in 8-man tournament final	
102	Tony Gunn	June 1, 2016	OVW TV Tapings	Louisville, Kentucky	2	77		
103	Bud Dwight	August 17, 2016	OVW TV Tapings	Louisville, Kentucky	2	28		
—	Vacated	September 14, 2016	OVW TV Tapings	Louisville, Kentucky	—	—	Vacated after Bud Dwight suffered a shoulder injury	
104	Tyler Matrix	September 17, 2016	Live Event	Elizabethtown, KY	1	18	Defeated Justin Smooth in tournament final	
105	Trevor Steele	October 5, 2016	OVW TV Tapings	Louisville, Kentucky	1	42		
106	Tyler Matrix	November 16, 2016	OVW TV Tapings	Louisville, Kentucky	2	70	This was a 6-man scramble ladder match also including Diamond, Justin Smooth, Robbie Walker and Tony Gunn	
107	Robbie Walker	January 25, 2017	OVW TV Tapings	Louisville, Kentucky	1	38	This was a fatal 4 way match also including Big Zo and Stuart Miles	
108	Reverend Stuart Miles	March 4, 2017	Saturday Night Special	Louisville, Kentucky	1	70		
109	Jade Dawson	May 13, 2017	Saturday Night Special	Louisville, Kentucky	1	32		
110	Reverend Stuart Miles	June 14, 2017	OVW TV Tapings	Louisville, Kentucky	2	17	This was a Gauntlet match also including Chace Destiny and Damion	
111	David Lee Lorenze III	July 1, 2017	Saturday Night Special	Louisville, Kentucky	1	<1	This was a Triple Threat match also including Jade Dawson	
112	Big Zo	July 1, 2017	Saturday Night Special	Louisville, Kentucky	1	35	Big Zo cashed in his Golden Ticket	
113	David Lee Lorenze III	August 5, 2017	Saturday Night Special	Louisville, Kentucky	2	49		
114	Reverend Stuart Miles	September 23, 2017	Matt Cappotelli Benefit Show	Louisville, Kentucky	3	14	This was an Eight Man Ladder match also including Adam Slade, Kevin Giza, KTD, Logan James, Paredyse and Paul Burchill	
115	Logan James	October 7, 2017	Saturday Night Special	Louisville, Kentucky	1	4	This was a fatal 4 way match also including David Lee Lorenze III and Randall Floyd	
116	Randall Floyd	October 11, 2017	OVW TV Tapings	Louisville, Kentucky	1	7		
117	Logan James	October 18, 2017	OVW TV Tapings	Louisville, Kentucky	2	7		
118	Randall Floyd	October 25, 2017	OVW TV Tapings	Louisville, Kentucky	2	101		
119	Logan James	February 3, 2018	Saturday Night Special	Louisville, Kentucky	3	130	This was a Title vs. Career Match	
120	Sam Thompson	June 13, 2018	OVW TV Tapings	Louisville, Kentucky	1	35		
121	Billy O	July 18, 2018	OVW TV Tapings	Louisville, Kentucky	1	90		
—	Vacated	October 16, 2018	-	Louisville, Kentucky	—	—	Vacated after a lack of defenses from Billy O	
122	Eddie Knight	October 17, 2018	OVW TV Tapings	Louisville, Kentucky	1	28	Defeated Dapper Dan to win the vacant title	
123	Dapper Dan	November 14, 2018	OVW TV Tapings	Louisville, Kentucky	2	7		
124	Dustin Jackson	November 21, 2018	OVW TV Tapings	Louisville, Kentucky	1	28		
125	Colton Cage	December 19, 2018	OVW TV Tapings	Louisville, Kentucky	1	21		
126	Justin Smooth	January 9, 2019	OVW TV Tapings	Louisville, Kentucky	1	35	This was a Gauntlet match also including Ca$h Flo, Dimes, Dustin Jackson and Eddie Knight	
127	Shiloh Jonze	February 13, 2019	OVW TV Tapings	Louisville, Kentucky	3	7	This was a Gauntlet match also including Dimes, Drew Hernandez, Melvin Maximus and Nigel Winters	
128	Big Zo	February 20, 2019	OVW TV Tapings	Louisville, Kentucky	2	7	This was a Gauntlet match also including Brandon Espinosa, Crimson, Jaden Roller, KTD and Melvin Maximus	
129	Colton Cage	February 27, 2019	OVW TV Tapings	Louisville, Kentucky	2	14	This was a Gauntlet match also including Crimson, Jax Dane, Justin Smooth, Leonis Khan and Maximus Khan	
130	Dustin Jackson	March 13, 2019	OVW TV Tapings	Louisville, Kentucky	2	7	This was a Gauntlet match also including Amon, Big Zo, Drew Hernandez and Phil Early	
—	Vacated	March 20, 2019	OVW TV Tapings	Louisville, Kentucky	—	—	Vacated after Dustin Jackson was attacked by Colton Cage and couldn't defend the title	
131	Dimes	March 20, 2019	OVW TV Tapings	Louisville, Kentucky	1	35	This was a Gauntlet match also including Adam Revolver, Amon, Drew Hernandez, Matt Vine and Nigel Winters	
—	Vacated	April 24, 2019	OVW TV Tapings	Louisville, Kentucky	—	—	Vacated after Dimes won the Heavyweight title and was told he could not hold both titles	
132	Jessie Godderz	April 24, 2019	OVW TV Tapings	Louisville, Kentucky	1	2	This was a Gauntlet match also including Adam Revolver, Ashton Cove, Colton Cage, Dustin Jackson and Nigel Winters	
133	Drew Hernandez	April 26, 2019	OVW Run for the Ropes	Louisville, Kentucky	1	26	This was a Gauntlet match also including Adam Revolver, Amon, Dimes and Tony Bizo	
134	Randall Floyd	May 22, 2019	OVW TV Tapings	Louisville, Kentucky	3	35	This was a Gauntlet match also including Ashton Cove, Big Zo, Chace Destiny and Sam Thompson	
135	William Lutz	June 26, 2019	OVW TV Tapings	Louisville, Kentucky	1	21	This was a Gauntlet match also including Brandon Espinosa, Drew Hernandez, Jay Bradley and Kyle Roberts	
136	Big Zo	July 17, 2019	OVW TV Tapings	Louisville, Kentucky	3	14	This was a Gauntlet match also including Ashton Cove, Drew Hernandez, KTD and Maximus Khan	
137	Jay Bradley	July 31, 2019	OVW TV Tapings	Louisville, Kentucky	1	21	This was a Gauntlet match also including Ashton Cove, Dustin Jackson, Randall Floyd, Sam Thompson and Shiloh Jonze	
138	Maximus Khan	August 21, 2019	OVW TV Tapings	Louisville, Kentucky	1	7	This was a Gauntlet match also including Chace, Colton Cage, Drew Hernandez and Vineeshhh	
139	Drew Hernandez	August 28, 2019	OVW TV Tapings	Louisville, Kentucky	2	14	This was a Gauntlet match also including Brandon Espinosa, Melvin Maximus, Nigel and Shiloh Jonze	
140	Rhino	September 11, 2019	OVW TV Tapings	Louisville, Kentucky	1	7	This was a Gauntlet match also including Ashton Cove, Chace, Chavo Guerrero, and Colton Cage	
141	Corey Storm	September 18, 2019	OVW TV Tapings	Louisville, Kentucky	1	13	This was a Gauntlet match also including Ashton Cove, Dapper Dan, Drew Hernandez, and Lee Holliday	
142	Tony Gunn	October 1, 2019	OVW TV Tapings	Louisville, Kentucky	3	21	This was a Gauntlet match also including AJZ, Ashton Cove, Drew Hernandez, and Steve Michaels	
143	AJZ	October 22, 2019	OVW TV Tapings	Louisville, Kentucky	1	28	This was a Gauntlet match also including Ashton Cove, Corey Storm, Dimes and William Lutz	
—	Deactivated	November 19, 2019	OVW TV Tapings	Louisville, Kentucky	—	—	On October 30, Tony Gunn threw the Television Championship into the Ohio River. OVW Commissioner Dean Hill announced on OVW TV that because of this, the Television Championship was deactivated. He also unveiled a new title sponsored by COLLARxELBOW.	

== Combined reigns ==
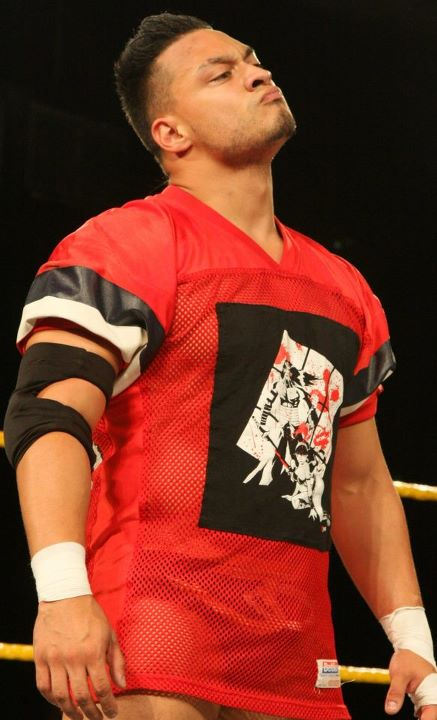
Record tying eight-time champion Jamin Olivencia.

Rank	Wrestler	No. of reigns	Combined days
1	Ali/Mohamad Ali Vaez	8	270
2	Kamikaze Kid/Paredyse	5	250
3	Seth Skyfire	2	217
4	Shawn Spears	3	186
5	Adam Revolver	7	160
6	Randy Royal	3	151
6	Melvin Maximus	2	151
8	Rudy Switchblade	3	150
8	Devin Driscoll	2	150
10	Randall Floyd	3	143
10	Christopher Silvio	2	143
12	Jamin Olivencia	8	141
12	Logan James	3	141
14	Ken Doane	1	140
15	Tony Gunn	3	112
15	Brent Albright	1	112
17	Reverend Stuart Miles	3	101
18	Michael Hayes	3	99
19	James Curtis	1	98
20	Mike Mondo	1	91
21	Billy O	1	90
22	Alex Silva	3	88
22	Ryan Howe	3	88
22	Tyler Matrix	2	88
25	Cliff Compton	2	85
26	J.D. Michaels	1	74
27	Charles Evans	2	63
27	Aaron Stevens	1	63
29	Shiloh Jonze	3	60
30	Rockstar Spud	1	59
31	Big Zo	3	56
31	Dapper Dan	2	56
31	Mike Kruel	2	56
31	CM Punk	1	56
35	David Lee Lorenze III	2	49
35	Ted McNaler	2	49
35	Brent Wellington	1	49
35	Outlaw	1	49
35	The Metal Master	1	49
35	Tommy McNaler	1	49
41	Bud Dwight	2	46
41	Big Jon	1	46
43	Igotta Brewski	1	42
43	Trevor Steele	1	42
45	Drew Hernandez	2	40
46	Flash Flanagan	1	39
47	Dylan Bostic	2	38
47	Robbie Walker	1	38
49	Colton Cage	2	35
49	Dustin Jackson	2	35
49	Dimes	1	35
49	Joey Matthews	1	35
49	Justin Smooth	1	35
49	Rocco Bellagio	1	35
49	Sam Thompson	1	35
56	Jade Dawson	1	32
57	AJZ	1	28
57	Eddie Knight	1	28
57	El Rojo Uno	1	28
60	Elijah Burke	1	24
60	Joe Coleman	1	24
62	Eddie Kraven	1	21
62	Jay Bradley	1	21
62	Johnny Punch	1	21
62	Mitch Huff	1	21
62	William Lutz	1	21
67	Rump Thump	1	18
68	Boris Alexiev	2	17
69	Colt Cabana	1	14
69	Deuce Shade	1	14
69	Jason Wayne	1	14
72	Corey Storm	1	13
73	Asher Knight	1	7
73	Cody Runnels	1	7
73	Maximus Khan	1	7
73	Moose	1	7
73	Rhino	1	7
78	Rob Terry	1	4
79	Jessie Godderz	1	2

== See also ==
- OVW Heavyweight Championship
- OVW Southern Tag Team Championship
- OVW Women's Championship
