= Brent Albright =

American professional wrestler

Personal information
- Born: November 28, 1978 (age 47) Tulsa, Oklahoma, U.S.

Professional wrestling career
- Ring name(s): Brent Albright; Gunner Scott; Slater Vain; Smoke; Vance Vain; Vinnie Valentino; Wayne Gator
- Billed height: 6 ft 0 in (1.83 m)
- Billed weight: 230 lb (100 kg)
- Billed from: Tulsa, Oklahoma
- Trained by: Oklahoma Pro Wrestling; Rocco Valentino
- Debut: October 10, 1998
- Retired: December 17, 2011

Brent Albright (born November 28, 1978) is an American retired professional wrestler, perhaps best known for his time with World Wrestling Entertainment, during which he appeared on SmackDown! as Gunner Scott. Aside from WWE, Albright is a one-time NWA World's Heavyweight Champion, having won the title while performing for Ring of Honor.

== Professional wrestling career ==
=== All Pro Wrestling (1998–2003) ===
Albright made his professional wrestling debut for All Pro Wrestling (APW) on October 10, 1998, as Vinnie Valentino, in a losing effort against Vinnie Massaro. He would gain his first win came in his second match in January 1999 when he, Chris Ward, and Tony Jones defeated Jason C. Clay, Nathaniel Sweete, and Rick Turner. Albright continued to wrestler for APW throughout his early years.

=== World Wrestling Federation / Entertainment (2001–2006) ===
==== Early appearances (2001–2004) ====
Albright wrestled several times for the World Wrestling Federation in 2001 and 2002, where he lost to cruiserweights such as Essa Rios. Later in 2003, he wrestled under the name Slater Vain for some of WWE's (formerly WWF) tertiary shows. He also teamed with Chris Cage in a tag match on the August 9, 2004 episode of WWE Raw against the team of Rhyno and Tajiri.

==== Ohio Valley Wrestling (2004–2006) ====
Albright signed a development contract in early 2004 and was sent to Ohio Valley Wrestling (OVW). During his time with OVW, Albright was both OVW Heavyweight Champion and OVW Television Champion, as well as co-holder of the OVW Southern Tag Team Championship with WWE wrestler Chris Masters. Albright was the first 'Triple Crown' winner in OVW, winning all 3 major titles.

Albright was the first OVW 'Beat the Champ' TV champion, which is now simply called the OVW TV title. He defeated Seth Skyfire on January 26, 2005, to win the title. He held that title until April 30, 2005, when he won his first OVW Heavyweight Championship by defeating Matt Morgan with the Crowbar. Albright vacated the TV title shortly after winning the OVW title. He was also the first person to hold two titles simultaneously in OVW. He held the OVW championship until August 3, when he lost to Johnny Jeter.

Shortly after losing the OVW title, Albright began a feud with Ken Doane over the OVW TV title in a feud that started over Doane accusing Albright of disrespecting the belt. In October 2005, in the midst of the feud with Doane, Albright also began feuding with CM Punk when Punk refused to shake Albright's hand after he had pinned him in a match. Punk would assault Albright prior to a TV title match against Doane and take his place, winning the belt when Albright accidentally hit the champion with a chair. He became a frequent challenger to Punk's TV gold, ultimately falling each week when Punk would find a way to weasel out the victory, be it a time-limit or an injury. In December 2005, Albright, Ken Doane and CM Punk competed in the first ever Triple Threat match in Ohio Valley Wrestling for the TV Title. Punk won the match when he made Albright submit to the Anaconda Vice while Albright also had Doane in a Sharpshooter. On January 4, 2006, Albright was in a rematch with Doane and Punk for the title. Doane was forced to leave the match early due to injury and was replaced by Aaron Stevens. Albright seemingly gained his revenge on Punk, eliminating him from the match with the crowbar, only to have Punk return and attack him, leading to Stevens winning the championship.

On the January 11, 2006, OVW show, Albright won a chance for a match against Stevens for the TV Title at an upcoming WWE house show in Louisville, Kentucky by actually teaming up with CM Punk in a match against Paul Burchill and Ken Doane. Punk and Albright won the match when Punk made Burchill submit to the Anaconda Vice, but Albright went on to lose the rematch against Stevens. The feud between Punk and Albright took a new turn when the two began teaming together weekly, competing with each other in a game of oneupmanship. Punk challenged Albright to see who could make their opponent submit the quickest in a match with The Highlanders. Albright made Rory submit in less than a minute, only to be attacked by Punk and choked out with the Anaconda Vice. Afterwards, just like many times before, Punk would tell Albright that he had been 'Punk'd'. After saving Punk from a 5 on 1 attack by the Spirit Squad, Albright told Punk that they would never be able to settle their differences as long as the Spirit Squad was around. The next week, Punk and Albright teamed up to take on all 5 members of the Spirit Squad in a match that saw Albright set-up Punk. Albright turned on Punk, giving the impression that being 'Punk'd' for months had finally gotten into his head to the point to where he was obsessed with returning the favor on Punk. Albright introduced a new element to their feud upon his heel turn: his grandfather's thick leather strap, which Albright used to continually whip Punk.

On the March 1, 2006 OVW show, CM Punk and Albright met in the finals of a tournament to crown a new OVW Heavyweight Champion (vacated by Matt Cappotelli). Punk suffered a knee injury in the match, and consequently had to be carried out on a stretcher, only to be attacked and whipped by Albright with the strap. Albright dragged Punk back to the ring, and after surviving a comeback by Punk, managed to lock in the STF. Though Punk did not submit, Albright managed to hold the lock in so that Punk would pass out, giving Brent the victory and making him a two-time OVW Heavyweight Champion. The next week, Albright vowed that Punk would never get a title shot at the OVW title unless he shook Albright's hand. A defeated Punk came out, but instead of shaking Albright's hand he hand-cuffed him to the top rope and viciously strapped him with Albright's own leather strap. This led to a strap match between the two on the May 3, 2006 OVW show, where Albright lost the title to Punk.

==== SmackDown! (2006) ====
Albright made his WWE debut on the April 7, 2006, episode of SmackDown!, under the ring name Gunner Scott. In his first match, he managed to defeat Booker T (due to The Boogeyman's music being played and distracting Booker T). Later during the show, Chris Benoit met him backstage and praised him on his winning debut. On the May 19 episode of SmackDown!, Scott teamed up with Benoit for the first time to take on Booker T and Finlay. Scott won the match, pinning Booker T once again with another distraction in the form of Bobby Lashley. On the June 16 episode of SmackDown!, Scott teamed up with Matt Hardy to take on Finlay and William Regal in a losing effort.

On June 28, 2006, Albright was sent back down to OVW. His last appearance on the main roster was on the June 30 episode of SmackDown!, in which he faced off against Mr. Kennedy in a losing effort. After the match he was destroyed by The Great Khali and thrown into a body bag. He continued to compete mostly on OVW house shows until he was eventually released from his WWE contract on October 12, 2006.

=== Pro Wrestling Noah (2003) ===
Albright toured Pro Wrestling Noah in 2003, where his first win came when he teamed with 2 Cold Scorpio to defeat Bull Schmitt and Donovan Morgan. He participated in a junior heavyweight tag team tournament along with Donovan Morgan and Michael Modest with the trio making the finals before losing to Makoto Hashi, Takashi Sugiura, and Yoshinobu Kanemaru.

=== Total Nonstop Action Wrestling (2003) ===
When he returned to the US, he lost to Shark Boy at thirty fourth Total Nonstop Action Wrestling Xplosion.

=== Ring of Honor (2006–2009) ===
Albright made his debut for Ring of Honor on October 27, 2006, in Dayton, Ohio with a loss to Christopher Daniels. In his second outing he participated in a gauntlet match where he defeated both Trik Davis and Jason Blade, after which the crowd chanted "Please Come Back" and "Welcome Home". After competing in Ring of Honor for over a month to earn a roster spot, he finally did on November 26, 2006.

Shortly after earning a roster spot, he turned heel after attacking Colt Cabana on the orders of Lacey. He became known as "The Gun for Hire" Brent Albright, willing to take payments to inflict injury on an opponent. At the International Challenge, he received a payment from Bryan Danielson to injure Homicide's shoulder shortly before their ROH World Championship match at Final Battle 2006.

He was, alongside B. J. Whitmer and Adam Pearce, a member of ROH's Hangmen 3 stable. In April 2008 "Sweet N'Sour" Larry Sweeney bought all three men's contracts and merged them into Sweet N'Sour Inc. Whitmer balked and was booted from the group. On May 10, 2008, Albright quit the group himself following a Tag Team Scramble match where he and Chris Hero lost to Delirious and Pelle Primeau. He suplexed every member of the group minus Sweeney who escaped.

After not appearing in ROH for nearly six months, Albright returned to the company at the March 5 tapings of Ring of Honor Wrestling.

=== National Wrestling Alliance (2007–2011) ===
Brent made the finals of the NWA Reclaiming the Glory tournament to crown a new NWA World Heavyweight Champion. On September 1, 2007, he lost to "Scrap Iron" Adam Pearce in the tournament finale in Bayamon, Puerto Rico and began chasing Pearce for the title. On August 2, 2008, in New York City Albright defeated Adam Pearce to win the NWA World Heavyweight Championship, however Pearce quickly regained the belt on September 20 at the New Alhambra Arena in Philadelphia.

Brent Albright also wrestled for NWA Showcase prior to retiring in 2011.

He also wrestled for Impact Zone Wrestling in Oklahoma from September 2011 to December 2011.

== Championships and accomplishments ==
- National Wrestling Alliance
  - NWA Oklahoma Heavyweight Championship (1 time)
  - NWA Universal Heavyweight Championship (1 time)
- Ohio Valley Wrestling
  - OVW Heavyweight Championship (2 times)
  - OVW Television Championship (1 time)
  - OVW Southern Tag Team Championship (1 time) – with Chris Masters
  - First OVW Triple Crown Champion
- Oklahoma Championship Wrestling
  - OCW Heavyweight Championship (1 time)
  - OCW Tag Team Championship (3 times) – with Rocco Valentino
- Oklahoma Wrestling Alliance
  - OWA Heavyweight Championship (1 time)
  - OWA Ironman Championship (2 times)
- Pro Wrestling Illustrated
  - Ranked No. 165 of the top 500 singles wrestlers in the PWI 500 in 2010
- Ring of Honor
  - NWA World Heavyweight Championship (1 time)
- Steel Rage Pro Wrestling
  - SRPW Heavyweight Championship (1 time)
- Xtreme Wrestling Entertainment
  - XWE United States Championship (1 time)
