= Alex Silva (wrestler) =

Canadian professional wrestler (born 1990)

Personal information
- Born: Alexander Freitas; January 23, 1990 (age 36) Montreal, Quebec, Canada

Professional wrestling career
- Ring name(s): Alex Silva; Pat Silva; Sean Simmons
- Billed height: 6 ft 0 in (1.83 m)
- Billed weight: 200 lb (91 kg)
- Billed from: Montreal, Quebec, Canada
- Trained by: Tommy Rose; Rip Rogers; Carl Leduc; Ohio Valley Wrestling
- Debut: 2004

Alexander Freitas (born January 23, 1990) is a Canadian professional wrestler. He is best known for his time in Total Nonstop Action Wrestling (TNA), where he is a former Impact Gut Check Winner under the ring name Alex Silva.

== Professional wrestling career ==
=== Training and early career (2004–2010) ===
After being trained by his father, Freitas debuted in 2004 for Paul LeDuc's FLQ promotion. Initially, Freitas adopted the ring name Sean Simmons, but soon began wrestling under the name Alex Silva. He spent the next few years wrestling mainly in Quebec, but also ventured (at 16 years old) into the United States to wrestle in Hawaii, Atlanta, Wisconsin, and Chicago.

On March 15, 2009, Silva won the CRW Quebec Championship by defeating Twister. He lost the championship to Jeremy Prophet on July 26, 2009.

=== Ring of Honor (2010–2011) ===
Throughout 2010 and 2011, Silva made appearances for Ring of Honor's Ring of Honor Wrestling television show, in losses to Michael Elgin, Roderick Strong, Tommaso Ciampa, and Mike Mondo.

=== Ohio Valley Wrestling (2010–2013) ===
Silva made his Ohio Valley Wrestling (OVW) debut on November 17, 2010. On December 11, Silva won the OVW Television Championship by defeating Mohamad Ali Vaez. His victory made him the youngest Television Champion in the promotion's history. He held the championship for 46 days before losing it back to Vaez on January 26, 2011. A weeks later, Silva left to return to Montreal.

Silva returned to the promotion in July 2011. On November 9, Silva defeated Rocco Bellagio to win the OVW Television Championship for the second time. He held the championship for only seven days, before dropping it to Adam Revolver on November 16. He returned to Montreal once again in early 2012, before returning to OVW on March 10, 2012. On September 12, Silva defeated Ryan Howe to win the OVW Television Championship for the third time. He lost his title against Cliff Compton on October 10.

After losing the Television Title, he began teaming with newcomer Sam Shaw. They began to feud with various tag teams in the coming weeks. On December 1, Silva and Shaw defeated Jessie Godderz and Rudy Switchblade for the OVW Southern Tag Team Championship. They lost the title to Crimson and Jason Wayne on January 16, 2013. But defeated them on February 27, 2013, to regain the titles and have a second reign. However, they lost the titles to The Coalition on April 3, 2013, and it was revealed afterward on his Twitter account that Silva had suffered a Grade 3 Concussion. On June 5, 2013, Alex Silva was released from OVW due to release from TNA.

=== WWE (2011) ===
On August 1, 2011, Silva was defeated by Brodus Clay in a dark match prior to World Wrestling Entertainment's Raw television show. The following night, he used the name Pat Silva in a second loss to Clay, which was taped for that week's episode of WWE Superstars.

=== Total Nonstop Action Wrestling (2011–2013) ===
On November 15, 2011, Silva wrestled a dark match for Total Nonstop Action Wrestling (TNA), losing to the TNA X Division Champion Austin Aries.

On the April 26, 2012, episode of Impact Wrestling, Silva made his televised TNA debut in a losing effort to Robbie E as part of the TNA Gut Check. On the following week's episode, Al Snow, Bruce Prichard and Ric Flair voted to give Silva a TNA contract after he cut a promo and he became part of the official roster. As a winner of TNA Gut Check, Silva was signed to a developmental contract with the promotion and assigned back to OVW. Silva returned to Impact Wrestling on November 22, losing to fellow Gut Check winner Sam Shaw.

On January 12, 2013, Silva took part in the taping of X-Travaganza, competing in a seven-man Xscape match (aired on April 5, 2013), which was won by Christian York. On January 12, 2013, Silva took part in the taping of Joker's Wild (airing on May 3, 2013), teaming with Hernandez in a loss to the Aces & Eights team of Devon & DOC.

On June 5, 2013, Silva's profile was removed from TNA roster page.

=== Return to the independent circuit (2013–2016, 2020–Present) ===
In December 2013, Silva made his debut for TOW Wrestling, an independent promotion based in Montreal, Quebec. He wrestled twice, defeating Volkano and "Surfer" Mitch Thompson. Since May 2014, Silva has made regular appearances for International Wrestling Syndicate. On July 29, 2014, Silva made his debut for Top of the World Wrestling where he defeated Buxx Belmar, followed by an appearance on August 2 at TOW Cage Fest 2 where he was defeated by Alextreme in a cage match. On November 27, 2014, Silva made his debut for Capital City Championship Combat where he was defeated by Sebastian Suave at their C4 Something Wicked This Way Comes event.

== Championships and accomplishments ==
- Attitude Wrestling Entertainment
  - AWE Heavyweight Championship (1 time)
- Combat Revolution Wrestling
  - CRW Quebec Championship (1 time)
- Montreal Wrestling Federation
  - MWF Tag Team Championship (1 time) – with Mike Bailey
- North Shore Pro Wrestling
  - NSPW Maritime Championship (1 time)
- Ohio Valley Wrestling
  - OVW Southern Tag Team Championship (2 times) – with Sam Shaw
  - OVW Television Championship (3 times)
- Pro Wrestling Illustrated
  - Ranked No. 215 of the top 500 singles wrestlers in the PWI 500 in 2013
- Resolute Wrestling
  - Resolute Championship (2 times)
  - Resolute Christy's Pub Grub Championship (1 time)
  - Resolute CPG Hardcore Championship (1 time)
  - Resolute Pound 4 Pound Championship (1 time)
  - Resolute Tag Team Championship (1 time) - with Dallas Troy
- Total Nonstop Action Wrestling
  - TNA Gut Check winner
