= Jack Vaughn =

American professional wrestler (born 1985)

Personal information
- Born: Dustin Thomas; 2 August 1985 (age 41) Franklin, Ohio, U.S.

Professional wrestling career
- Ring name(s): Jack Vaughn; Dustin Thomas; Muldoon
- Billed height: 6 ft 6 in (1.98 m)
- Billed weight: 260 lb (120 kg)
- Debut: 2004

Dustin Thomas (born August 2, 1985), better known as Jack Vaughn is an American professional wrestler. He is one half of tag team The Hardway alongside Dalton McKenzie, and they are the current NWA United States Tag Team Champions, having won the title from The Slimeballz (Sage Chantz and Tommy Rant) at NWA Hard Times 6 on June 6, 2026 (the title match was shown on tape delay in the August 1, 2026 episode of NWA Powerrr).

== Career ==
Thomas began his career in 2004, wrestling on the independent circuit in Ohio. In 2021, he made his debut with Ohio Valley Wrestling. He has also wrestled for the National Wrestling Alliance, as well as independent promotions in Europe.

Vaughn is also known for his comedy wrestling videos.

== Championships and accomplishments ==
- Ohio Valley Wrestling
  - OVW Heavyweight Championship (3 times)
  - OVW Tag Team Championship (3 times) – with Donovan Cecil
  - OVW Media Championship (1 time)
- National Wrestling Alliance
  - NWA United States Tag Team Championship (1 time, current) – with Dalton McKenzie
