= Jamin Olivencia =

American professional wrestler (born 1985)

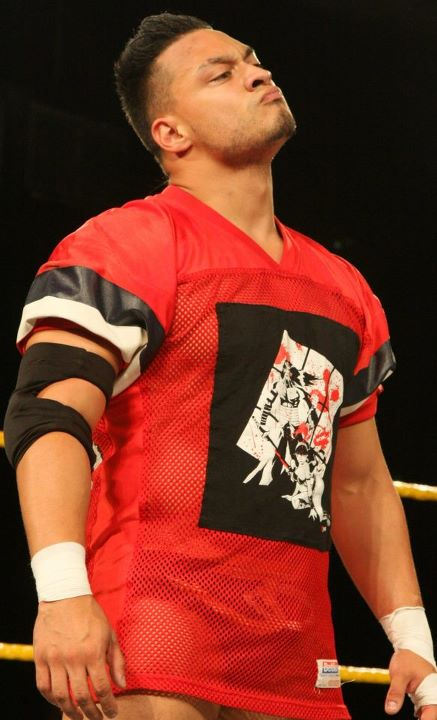

Personal information
- Born: August 7, 1985 (age 41) North Tonawanda, New York
- Children: 1

Professional wrestling career
- Ring name(s): J-Man; Jamin Canseco; Jamin Olivencia; Chito Martinez; Nick Nardone
- Billed height: 5 ft 10 in (1.78 m)
- Billed weight: 216 lb (98 kg)
- Billed from: Buffalo, New York
- Trained by: Rip Rogers; Ohio Valley Wrestling
- Debut: 2003
- Retired: August 21, 2025

Jamin Olivencia (born August 7, 1985) is an American retired professional wrestler, He is best known for his time in Ohio Valley Wrestling (OVW) promotion, where he is a former three-time OVW Heavyweight Champion holding the former record for the longest reign at 241 days. He is also tied, with Mohamad Ali Vaez, for the most OVW Television Championship reigns with eight.

== Professional wrestling career ==
=== Early career (2003–2005) ===
Olivencia made his wrestling debut under the J-Man ring name, at the age of 17, on August 16, 2003, at the Empire State Wrestling show losing to Benjamin Smythe. On September 9, he lost to Cade Cassidy. On December 6, Jamin formed a team with R-Haz as "The New City Thugs" and defeated Damien Alexander and JP Hawke to win the ESW Tag Team Championship, Jamin's first championship. They defeated Alexander and Hawke on January 24, 2004, via disqualification to retain their championship. After defeating Grappler X and Purple Rain on February 15, they lost the championships to them on March 20. On May 20, he challenged Shade for the ESW Interstate Championship, but was unsuccessful in winning the championship. Jamin's first singles victory was on July 7 when he won a battle royal. After a year of teaming, J-Man and R-Haz fought in a street fight with J-Man winning the match. In the end of 2004, J-Man challenged Jonny Puma for the ESW Heavyweight Championship on November 6 and December 4 but was unsuccessful in winning the championship. His last match for the promotion was on September 16, 2005, defeating Cade Cassidy.

=== World Wrestling Entertainment/WWE ===
==== Ohio Valley Wrestling (2005–2006) ====
Olivencia debuted in Ohio Valley Wrestling (OVW) in 2005, when it was a Developmental Territory for World Wrestling Entertainment. On August 1, 2007, he teamed with T.J. Dalton to defeat the James Boys (Cassidy and KC James) to win the OVW Southern Tag Team Championship. The team lost the championship to the James Boys on August 24. After the loss, Olivencia was inactive for several months, returning on November 7, teaming with Ace Steel to lose to Matt Sydal and Seth Skyfire in a tournament for the OVW Southern Tag Team Championship.

==== Jobber and extra appearances (2005–2013) ====
When Ohio Valley Wrestling was unaffiliated, this also was the end between OVW and WWE. Olivencia has appeared on World Wrestling Entertainment television programming on several occasions. His first appearance for the promotion was on November 28, 2005, as Jaymin Olivers, teaming with Brad Bradley against Val Venis and Viscera in a losing effort. On July 13, 2010, he made appearance as Jamin Canseco at WWE Superstars teaming with Matt Cross losing to Curt Hawkins and Vance Archer. He also appeared on the July 30 episode of Raw, used as one of the men in white taking Daniel Bryan to hospital, alongside fellow OVW wrestler Dylan Bostic. Olivencia competed as Nick Nardone at the WWE SmackDown taping for September 20, 2013. He lost a squash match against Ryback.

=== Ohio Valley Wrestling ===
==== Debut (2005–2008) ====
Olivencia debuted in Ohio Valley Wrestling (OVW) in 2005. On August 1, 2007, he teamed with T.J. Dalton to defeat the James Boys (Cassidy and KC James) to win the OVW Southern Tag Team Championship. The team lost the championship to the James Boys on August 24. After the loss, Olivencia was inactive for several months, returning on November 7, teaming with Ace Steel to lose to Matt Sydal and Seth Skyfire in a tournament for the OVW Southern Tag Team Championship. In the beginning of 2008, Olivencia and Steel challenged Paul Burchill and Stu Sanders, but were unsuccessful in winning the OVW Southern Tag Team titles.

==== Pursuit of the Television Champion (2008–2012) ====
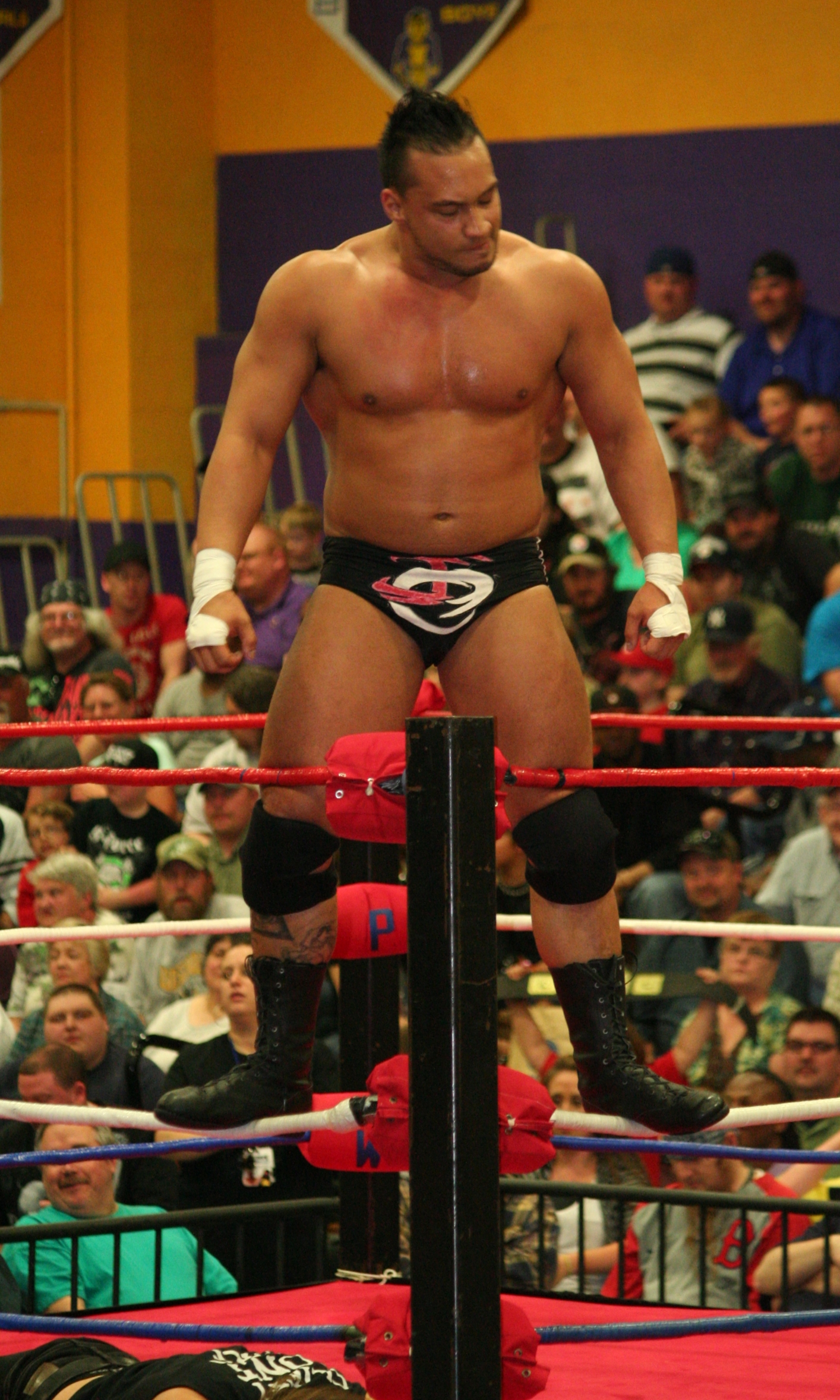
Olivencia at an indy event in 2013

On February 20, 2008, he defeated James Curtis to win the OVW Television Championship, and became the first champion since OVW and World Wrestling Entertainment (WWE) ended their working relationship. Jamin would go on to lose the title on March 12, 2008, and would go on to recapture the OVW Television Title and have a vicious feud with former WWE Tag Team Champion Joey Matthews which lasted the better part of 2008. On October 15, Olivencia defeated Rudy Switchblade by forfeit, but lost it on the same day to Igotta Brewski. On May 6, 2009, Olivencia defeated Mike Mondo to win the OVW Television Championship for the third time. He lost the title on May 13, to El Rojo Uno, and regained it on June 10. Olivencia then started a feud with Brent Wellington, who won his OVW Television Championship on July 22. On May 7, 2010, Olivencia defeated Kamikaze Kid to win the OVW Television Championship for the fifth time. He lost the title to Mohamad Ali Vaez on June 4. On May 14, 2011, at the Saturday Night Special, he defeated Vaez for the championship, but lost it on May 25. On June 2, 2012, Olivencia defeated Mohamad Ali Vaez to win the OVW Television Championship for the record-tying seventh time. After a four-month absence, Jamin returned to the promotion on November 10 at the edition of OVW episode 691, challenging Joe Coleman for the OVW Television Championship but was unsuccessful in capturing the belt after Coleman got himself disqualified. Jamin faced Coleman for the championship also on November 17 at OVW episode 692 and December 1 at OVW episode 693, but Coleman got himself disqualified again. On December 1, at OVW's Saturday Night Special, Jamin Olivencia defeated Coleman in a no disqualifications match to win the OVW Television Championship for the record–setting eighth time.

==== OVW Heavyweight Champion (2013–2014) ====
After pinning Doug Williams twice in a non-title matches at OVW's episode 704 and episode 705, Olivencia was named the new number one contender for the OVW Heavyweight Championship. On March 2, at OVW's Saturday Night Special, Olivencia defeated Williams to win the OVW Heavyweight Championship, But on March 6, the title was returned to Doug after Doug wasn't disqualified during the match. Olivencia defeated Williams April 10, 2013, to win the OVW Heavyweight Championship. On October 19, 2013, Olivencia became the longest reigning OVW Heavyweight Champion, breaking Rip Rogers previous record of 192 days(record has since been broken by Rocco Bellagio). After 241 days as champion, the title was vacated on December 4, 2013. Three days later, Olivencia defeated Johnny Spade to regain the title. On December 25, 2013, Marcus Anthony defeated Olivencia for the title. However, referee reverted the decision because Anthony didn't stop to apply his submission maneuver and Olivencia retained the title. However, on January 4, 2014, Olivencia lost the title to Anthony. On May 10, 2014, Olivencia defeated Anthony in a rematch to win the OVW Heavyweight Championship for a third time. On July 5, 2014, Olivencia lost the title against Anthony in a Last Man Standing match. Due to the stipulation, Jamin would not be able to challenge for it for ninety days. Afterwards, Jamin would align himself with the returning Chris Silvio and the two would go on to capture The OVW Southern Tag Team Championship on the August 2 Saturday Night Special, defeating The Fabulous Free Bodies (The Bodyguy and Big Jon). A month later, Silvi-O-livencia lost the titles to War Machine (Eric Locker & Shiloh Jonze) on September 6.

Shortly afterward, after 9 years working at OVW, Olivencia left the company.

==== Sporadic appearances (2017) ====
On September 23, 2017, Olivencia made a return to OVW for the OVW Matt Cappotelli Benefit Show defeating Shiloh Jonze.

Olivencia made his final OVW appearance on the November 25, 2017, episode of OVW TV challenging Michael Hayes for the OVW Heavyweight Championship and winning via disqualification.

=== Various promotions (2010–2011) ===
On November 16, 2010, Olivencia had a tryout for Total Nonstop Action Wrestling wrestling Stevie Richards in a dark match.

On the November 23, 2011, edition of Ring of Honor Wrestling Olivencia faced Mike Bennett in a losing effort.

On August 21, 2025; Jamin Olivencia, he concluded his career with a final match against Kal Herro for the OVW Heavyweight Championship. Following the match, he delivered an emotional retirement speech at the OVW Davis Arena, marking the end of a career that spanned over two decades.

=== Global Force Wrestling (2015) ===
On May 11, 2015, Olivencia was announced as part of roster of the Global Force Wrestling (GFW) promotion. On June 12, 2015, Olivencia made his GFW debut losing to Sonjay Dutt during a GFW Grand Slam Tour event in Jackson, Tennessee. The following night, Olivencia teamed with Jason Kincaid in a losing effort against Chase Owens and Sonjay Dutt. On July 10, 2015, during a GFW Grand Slam Tour event in Erie, Pennsylvania, Olivencia teamed with Jon Bolen in a losing effort against Sonjay Dutt and Moose. The following night, Olivencia was defeated by Bolen in a singles match.

== Other media ==
Olivencia additionally works as a stunt performer, and performed stunt in the Dukes of Hazzard film. He is also an actor, and appeared in The Elaborate Entrance of Chad Deity at the Actors Theatre of Louisville, portraying three characters and choreographing most of the fighting/wrestling scenes.

== Championships and accomplishments ==
- Empire State Wrestling
  - ESW Tag Team Championship (1 time) – with R-Haz
- Ohio Valley Wrestling
  - OVW Heavyweight Championship (3 times)
  - OVW Television Championship (8 times)
  - OVW Southern Tag Team Championship (2 times) – with TJ Dalton (1) and Chris Silvio (1)
  - Eleventh OVW Triple Crown Champion
- Pro Wrestling Illustrated
  - PWI ranked him #142 of the top 500 singles wrestlers in the PWI 500 in 2013
