= Andreas John Ziegler =

Actor and professional wrestler

Andreas Ziegler
Personal information
- Born: April 14, 1999 (age 27) West Bend, Wisconsin, U.S.

Professional wrestling career
- Ring names: A. J. Z.; A.J. Ziegler; Andreas Ziegler; Andreas John Ziegler; Mr. Elegance
- Billed height: 6 ft 1 in (185 cm)
- Billed weight: 233 lb (106 kg)
- Billed from: Laguna Beach, California, United States
- Trained by: Labron Kozone; Rip Rogers; Trevor Adonis

Andreas John Ziegler (born April4, 1999), better known by his ring name A. J. Z., is an American professional wrestler and actor. He is signed to TNA Wrestling, where he performs under the ring name Mr. Elegance and is a former member of The Elegance Brand.

== Early life ==
Ziegler began working out in his parents' basement at nine years old. In 2010, he became a national freestyle skiing champion. He also won various bodybuilding titles as a teenager. In 2020, he graduated from Coastal Carolina University majoring in marketing.

== Professional wrestling career ==
=== Training ===
In 2019, Ziegler graduated from Firestar Pro Wrestling, under Labron Kozone. He wrestled under the name "The Golden Boy" A. J. Z. In 2019, he began working for Ohio Valley Wrestling. He performed for their live weekly television for two years. During his tenure at OVW, A. J. Z. feuded with many wrestlers including: Tony Gunn, Ryan Howe, Jay Bradley, and The Tate Twins. On October 22, 2019, he won the OVW Television Championship, and to this day is the final person to ever hold that title. His final match at OVW was against Jessie Godderz for the National Heavyweight Championship.

=== Independent circuit ===
A. J. Z. also wrestles for AAW, Northeast Wrestling, and various other promotions. Over the years A. J. Z. has had numerous matches with former WWE Superstar Enzo Amore. He also was in a six-man tag team match against the returning Big Cass for Impact Wrestling Plus.

=== NJPW, Ring of Honor, and return to OVW (2021–2025) ===
In 2021, Ziegler began working for NJPW Strong (TV Series). He debuted against Rocky Romero in a losing attempt. That match was known as his first mainstream appearance. His next appearance was in a match against Clark Connors. His last known appearance was at NJPW Autumn Attack. A. J. Z. signed with Control Your Narrative. A. J. Z. was a part of the first ever match, at the first ever CYN event, that was held in Orlando, Florida.

On June 17, 2023, A. J. Z. debuted for ROH at the United Center in Chicago Illinois. He competed against the ROH six-man tag team champions the Mogul Embassy's Brian Cage, Kaun, and Toa Liona. They were managed by Prince Nana.

On June 17, 2023, A.J.Z. appeared in an episode of Destination Polaris which also featured Braun Strowman. The two showed host Alexa Score how to wrestle. Destination Polaris airs nationally on television.

Ziegler renamed himself "The Hunter" A.J.Z. Using this new persona, he has wrestled all over the United States and into Canada on the independent wrestling scene. In June 2024, AJZ returned to OVW. He has aligned himself with Doug Basham and won the OVW Southern Tag Team Championship. AJZ and Basham won in the main event at one of OVW's biggest-ever shows on Saturday, August 31. OVW Fight Night took place at the Appalachian Wireless Arena in Pikeville, Kentucky.

=== TNA Wrestling (2025–present) ===
In June 2025, AJZ debuted for TNA Wrestling. He wrestled against a debuting Cedric Alexander. He has consistently appeared alongside Mustafa Ali.

On Thursday Night Impact!'s AMC debut on January 15, 2026, AJZ was revealed as Mr. Elegance, the new member of The Elegance Brand. He assisted The Elegance Brand's Heather by Elegance and M by Elegance to win the TNA Knockouts World Tag Team Championship. On the October 29, 2026 episode of Impact, Mr. Elegance left the stable after refusing to help M during her TNA Knockouts Television Championship match against Jada Stone.

== Professional wrestling style and persona ==
Ziegler's character is "The Golden Boy", an arrogant wrestler who thinks he is better than anyone else. In kayfabe, he is also presented as the nephew of WWE wrestler Dolph Ziggler.

== Championships and accomplishments ==
=== Bodybuilding ===
- October 2015 WNBF
  - 1st Teens Class & 1st Men's Middle-Weight
- July 2017 Nationals
  - 5th Teen Light Heavy-Weight Bodybuilding
  - 2nd National Teen Physique
  - 1st National Teen Physique Class B

=== Skiing ===
- USASA
  - 4th in the Nation – Freestyle Skiing

=== Professional wrestling ===
- Ohio Valley Wrestling
  - OVW Television Championship (1 time, final)
  - OVW Southern Tag Team Championship (1 time) – with Dalton McKenzie
