= OVW Tag Team Championship =

Professional wrestling tag team championship

Details
- Promotion: Ohio Valley Wrestling
- Date established: August 1, 1997
- Current champions: Damn OGs (Adam Revolver and Tony Gunn)
- Date won: August 15, 2026

Other names
- NWA OVW Southern Tag Team Championship (1998 - 2001); OVW Southern Tag Team Championship (2001 - 2020); OVW Tag Team Championship (2020–present)
Statistics
- First champions: Nick Dinsmore and Flash Flanagan
- Most reigns: Team: The Lords of the Ring (Rob Conway and Nick Dinsmore) (10 reigns); Individual: Rob Conway, Nick Dinsmore and Adam Revolver (11 reigns)
- Longest reign: The Legacy Of Brutality (Hy Zaya, Ca$h Flo, Big Zo, Hy-Zaya, Jay Bradley, and Steve Michaels) (280 days)
- Shortest reign: Charles Evans and Colt Cabana (<1 day)

The OVW Tag Team Championship (formerly known as the OVW Southern Tag Team Championship) is the tag team titles of Ohio Valley Wrestling. Created in 1997, the first champions were Nick Dinsmore and Flash Flanagan. There have been 204 reigns shared between 126 different teams consisting of 175 distinctive champions and 17 vacancies. The current champions are Damn OGs (Adam Revolver and Tony Gunn), who are in their first reign as a team, but are in their eleventh and fourth reigns individually.

== Title history ==
Key
No.	Overall reign number
Reign	Reign number for the specific team—reign numbers for the individuals are in parentheses, if different
Days	Number of days held
<1	Reign lasted less than a day
+	Current reign is changing daily

No.	Champion	Championship change			Reign statistics		Notes	Ref.
No.	Champion	Date	Event	Location	Reign	Days	Notes	Ref.
1	Nick Dinsmore and Flash Flanagan	August 1, 1997	OVW TV Tapings	Jeffersonville, IN	1	31		
2	David C. and Jason Lee	September 1, 1997	OVW TV Tapings	Jeffersonville, IN	1	76		
—	Vacated	November 16, 1997	OVW TV Tapings	Jeffersonville, IN	—	—	The titles were held up after a match against Cousin Otter and Jebediah Blackhawk.	
3	David C. and Jason Lee	November 23, 1997	OVW TV Tapings	Jeffersonville, IN	2	49	Defeated Jebediah Blackhawk and Cousin Otter in a rematch.	
4	Doug Basham and Flash Flanagan	January 11, 1998	OVW TV Tapings	Jeffersonville, IN	1 (1, 2)	14	Basham and Flanagan defeated David C. and Jason Lee, Jebediah Blackhawk and Cousin Otter and The Lords of the Ring in a fatal four-way tag team match.	
—	Vacated	January 25, 1998	OVW TV Tapings	Louisville, KY	—	—	The titles were declared vacant after a match against Rip Rogers and Trailer Park Trash.	
5	The Lords of the Ring (Nick Dinsmore and Rob Conway)	March 18, 1998	OVW TV Tapings	Jeffersonville, IN	1 (2, 1)	46	Defeated Rip Rogers and Trailer Park Trash in a tournament finals to win the vacant titles.	
6	Dave the Rave and Rip Rogers	May 3, 1998	OVW TV Tapings	Jeffersonville, IN	1	10		
7	The Lords of the Ring (Nick Dinsmore and Rob Conway)	May 13, 1998	OVW TV Tapings	Jeffersonville, IN	2 (3, 2)	4		
8	Dave the Rave and Rip Rogers	May 17, 1998	OVW TV Tapings	Jeffersonville, IN	2	7	The Lords of the Ring (Nick Dinsmore and Rob Conway) were stripped of titles and were returned to Rave and Rogers after Dinsmore had his feet on the ropes to win the titles and referee Robert Brisco knowingly allowed it.	
9	The Lords of the Ring (Nick Dinsmore and Rob Conway)	May 24, 1998	OVW TV Tapings	Jeffersonville, IN	3 (4, 3)	3		
—	Vacated	May 27, 1998	OVW TV Tapings	Jeffersonville, IN	—	—	The titles were held up after a match with Flash Flanagan and Jason Lee ended in a no contest.	
10	The Lords of the Ring (Nick Dinsmore and Rob Conway)	June 14, 1998	OVW TV Tapings	Jeffersonville, IN	4 (5, 4)	14	defeated Flash Flanagan and Jason Lee in a tournament finals to win the vacant titles.	
11	Dave the Rave and Juan Hurtado	June 28, 1998	OVW TV Tapings	Jeffersonville, IN	1 (3, 1)	3		
12	Cousin Otter and Jebediah Blackhawk	July 1, 1998	OVW TV Tapings	Jeffersonville, IN	1	39	Awarded titles by forfeit when Dave the Rave no-showed the defense.	
13	Bryan Cash and Juan Hurtado	August 9, 1998	OVW TV Tapings	Jeffersonville, IN	1 (1, 2)	44		
—	Vacated	September 22, 1998	OVW TV Tapings	Jeffersonville, IN	—	—	Titles declared vacant due Bryan Cash's injury.	
14	The Lords of the Ring (Nick Dinsmore and Rob Conway)	September 27, 1998	OVW TV Tapings	Jeffersonville, IN	5 (6, 5)	28	Defeated Jason Lee and Rod Steel in a tournament finals to win the vacant titles.	
15	The Andretti Express (Guido and Vito Andretti)	October 25, 1998	OVW TV Tapings	Jeffersonville, IN	1	30		
16	The Lords of the Ring (Nick Dinsmore and Rob Conway)	November 24, 1998	OVW TV Tapings	Jeffersonville, IN	6 (7, 6)	14		
—	Vacated	December 8, 1998	OVW TV Tapings	Louisville, KY	—	—	Titles held up after a match against Matt Bloom and Bull Pain.	
17	Damaja and David C.	January 16, 1999	OVW TV Tapings	Jeffersonville, IN	1 (1, 3)	11	Awarded the titles back, after Nick Dinsmore no-showed and Rob Conway was counted out.	
18	The Lords of the Ring (Nick Dinsmore and Rob Conway)	January 27, 1999	OVW TV Tapings	Jeffersonville, IN	7 (8, 7)	6	Won the match under masks as the Borkcin Brothers, and unmasked after the victory.	
19	Damaja and David C.	February 2, 1999	OVW TV Tapings	Louisville, KY	2 (2, 4)	5		
20	Cousin Otter and Jebediah Blackhawk	February 7, 1999	OVW TV Tapings	Jeffersonville, IN	2	51		
21	Flash Flanagan and Trailer Park Trash	March 30, 1999	OVW TV Tapings	Louisville, KY	1 (3, 1)	112		
22	The Suicide Blondes (Jason Lee and Rip Rogers)	July 20, 1999	OVW TV Tapings	Louisville, KY	1 (3, 3)	148		
23	Jebediah Blackhawk and Trailer Park Trash	December 15, 1999	OVW TV Tapings	Jeffersonville, IN	1 (3, 2)	48		
24	Bolin Services (Mr. Black and Bull Buchanan)	February 1, 2000	OVW TV Tapings	Louisville, KY	1 (3, 1)	43	Mr. Black previously known as Cousin Otter.	
25	The Paynethrillers (B.J. Payne and Scotty Sabre)	March 15, 2000	OVW TV Tapings	Louisville, KY	1	14		
26	The Suicide Blondes (Derrick King and Jason Lee)	March 29, 2000	OVW TV Tapings	Jeffersonville, IN	1 (1, 4)	6		
27	The Paynethrillers (B.J. Payne and Scotty Sabre)	April 4, 2000	OVW TV Tapings	Jeffersonville, IN	2	80		
28	The Disciples of Synn (Damian and Slash)	June 23, 2000	OVW TV Tapings	Louisville, KY	1	26		
29	The Paynethrillers (B.J. Payne and Scotty Sabre)	July 19, 2000	OVW TV Tapings	Jeffersonville, IN	3	16		
30	Steve Armstrong and Tracy Smothers	July 21, 2000	OVW TV Tapings	Knoxville, TN	1	14		
31	The Disciples of Synn (Damian and Slash)	August 4, 2000	OVW TV Tapings	Louisville, KY	2	74		
32	B.J. Payne and Flash Flanagan	October 17, 2000	OVW TV Tapings	Louisville, KY	1 (4, 4)	78		
33	The Disciples of Synn (B.J. Payne and Damian)	January 3, 2001	OVW TV Tapings	Jeffersonville, IN	1 (5, 3)	41	B.J. Payne defeated Flanagan in a singles match for the tag titles, then chose Damian as his new partner.	
34	The Minnesota Stretching Crew (Brock Lesnar and Shelton Benjamin)	February 13, 2001	OVW TV Tapings	Jeffersonville, IN	1	67		
35	The Disciples of Synn (B.J. Payne and Damian)	April 22, 2001	OVW TV Tapings	Louisville, KY	2 (6, 4)	24		
36	The Minnesota Stretching Crew (Brock Lesnar and Shelton Benjamin)	May 16, 2001	WWF Sunday Night Heat Dark Match	Louisville, KY	2	59	Defeated The Disciples of Synn at a WWF Sunday Night Heat show in a dark match.	
—	Vacated	July 14, 2001	OVW TV Tapings	Louisville, KY	—	—	Titles were vacated when Shelton Benjamin was injured.	
37	Bolin Services (The Prototype and Rico Constantino)	August 15, 2001	OVW TV Tapings	Jeffersonville, IN	1	75	Defeated The Disciples of Synn in a tournament finals.	
38	The Minnesota Stretching Crew (Brock Lesnar and Shelton Benjamin)	October 29, 2001	WWF Jakked dark match	Louisville, KY	3	9	Defeated Bolin Services at a WWF Jakked/Metal show in a dark match.	
39	The Suicide Blondes (Derrick King and Jason Lee)	November 7, 2001	OVW TV Tapings	Louisville, KY	2 (2, 5)	35		
40	The Lords of the Ring (Nick Dinsmore and Rob Conway)	December 12, 2001	OVW TV Tapings	Jeffersonville, IN	8 (9, 8)	56		
41	The Basham Brothers (Damaja and Doug Basham)	February 6, 2002	OVW TV Tapings	Jeffersonville, IN	1 (3, 2)	100		
42	The Lords of the Ring (Nick Dinsmore and Rob Conway)	May 17, 2002	WWE Raw House Show	Louisville, KY	9 (10, 9)	14	Defeated Doug and Damaja Basham at a WWE Raw house show.	
43	Flash Flanagan and Trailer Park Trash	May 31, 2002	OVW TV Tapings	Louisville, KY	2 (5, 3)	14		
44	The Lords of the Ring (Nick Dinsmore and Rob Conway)	June 14, 2002	OVW TV Tapings	Louisville, KY	10 (11, 10)	14		
45	Flash Flanagan and Trailer Park Trash	June 28, 2002	OVW TV Tapings	Louisville, KY	3 (6, 4)	19		
46	The Dogg Pound (Redd Dogg and Shelton Benjamin)	July 17, 2002	OVW TV Tapings	Jeffersonville, IN	1 (1, 4)	175		
—	Vacated	January 8, 2003	OVW TV Tapings	Louisville, KY	—	—	Titles declared vacant, after Benjamin and Dogg were both called up to WWE.	
47	The Disciples of Synn (Seven and Travis Bane)	March 5, 2003	OVW TV Tapings	Louisville, KY	1	36	Defeated Bolin Services (Lance Cade and René Duprée) in tournament final.	
48	The A.P.A. (Bradshaw and Ron Simmons)	April 10, 2003	Live Event	Lafayette, IN	1	50		
—	Vacated	May 8, 2003	OVW TV Tapings	Louisville, KY	—	—	Titles vacated when Bradshaw and Simmons were called back up by WWE.	
49	Adrenaline (Chris Cage and Tank Toland)	June 27, 2003	OVW TV Tapings	Louisville, KY	1	105	Defeated Bolin Services (Lance Cade and Mark Jindrak) in a tournament finals.	
50	The Jersey Shore Crew (Aaron Stevens and Nova)	October 10, 2003	WWE Raw House Show	Louisville, KY	1	146	Defeated Adrenaline at a WWE Raw house show.	
51	Adrenaline (Chris Cage and Tank Toland)	March 4, 2004	OVW TV Tapings	Louisville, KY	2	27		
52	Brent Albright and Chris Masters	March 31, 2004	OVW TV Tapings	Louisville, KY	1	91		
53	Mac Johnson and Seth Skyfire	June 30, 2004	OVW TV Tapings	Louisville, KY	1	70		
54	Adrenaline (Chris Cage and Tank Toland)	September 8, 2004	OVW TV Tapings	Louisville, KY	3	<1		
—	Vacated	September 8, 2004	OVW TV Tapings	Louisville, KY	—	—	Titles held up after a controversial finish in the September 8 match between Adrenaline and Mac Johnson and Seth Skyfire.	
55	Mac Johnson and Seth Skyfire	September 29, 2004	OVW TV Tapings	Louisville, KY	2	46	Defeated Adrenaline in a rematch.	
56	MNM (Joey Matthews and Johnny Nitro)	November 14, 2004	OVW TV Tapings	Louisville, KY	1	66		
57	The Thrillseekers (Johnny Jeter and Matt Cappotelli)	January 19, 2005	OVW TV Tapings	Louisville, KY	1	83		
58	The Blonde Bombers (Chad and Tank Toland)	April 12, 2005	OVW TV Tapings	Louisville, KY	1 (1, 4)	183		
59	Chet Jablonski and Seth Skyfire	October 12, 2005	OVW TV Tapings	Louisville, KY	1 (1, 3)	119		
60	Bolin Services (Chris Cage and The Miz)	February 8, 2006	OVW TV Tapings	Louisville, KY	1 (4, 1)	39		
61	The Untouchables (Deuce and Domino)	March 19, 2006	OVW TV Tapings	Louisville, KY	1	17	Deuce Shade pinned The Miz in a singles match. Won the titles after Cage was fired by WWE.	
62	Kasey James and Roadkill	April 5, 2006	OVW TV Tapings	Louisville, KY	1	52	Defeated The Untouchables and The Spirit Squad (Kenny and Mikey) in a three-way match. The WWE World Tag Team Championship was also on the line, but only the OVW Tag Team Championship changed hands since Roadkills pinned Shade.	
63	The Gang Stars (The Neighborhoodie and Shad Gaspard)	May 27, 2006	OVW TV Tapings	Louisville, KY	1	62		
64	CM Punk and Seth Skyfire	July 28, 2006	OVW TV Tapings	Louisville, KY	1 (1, 4)	5		
65	The Untouchables (Deuce and Domino)	August 2, 2006	OVW TV Tapings	Louisville, KY	2	77		
66	Cody Runnels and Shawn Spears	October 18, 2006	OVW TV Tapings	Louisville, KY	1	49		
—	Vacated	December 6, 2006	OVW TV Tapings	Louisville, KY	—	—	Held up after a match against The Untouchables ended as a draw.	
67	The Untouchables (Deuce and Domino)	December 6, 2006	OVW TV Tapings	Louisville, KY	3	7	Defeated Cody Runnels and Shawn Spears in a rematch.	
68	Cody Runnels and Shawn Spears	December 13, 2006	OVW TV Tapings	Louisville, KY	2	119		
69	Bolin Services (Charles Evans and Justin LaRouche)	April 11, 2007	OVW TV Tapings	Louisville, KY	1	65		
70	The Major Brothers (Brett Major and Brian Major)	June 15, 2007	OVW TV Tapings	Louisville, KY	1	14	Defeated Evans, LaRouche, and Dr. Tomas in a three-on-two handicap match.	
71	The James Boys (K.C. James and Kassidy James)	June 29, 2007	OVW TV Tapings	Louisville, KY	1 (2, 1)	22	K.C. previously known as Kasey James.	
72	Cryme Tyme (JTG and Shad Gaspard)	July 21, 2007	Live Event	Owensboro, KY	2	1		
73	The James Boys (K.C. James and Kassidy James)	July 22, 2007	Live Event	Louisville, KY	2 (3, 2)	10		
74	Jamin Olivencia and T.J. Dalton	August 1, 2007	OVW TV Tapings	Louisville, KY	1	23		
75	The James Boys (K.C. James and Kassidy James)	August 24, 2007	OVW TV Tapings	Louisville, KY	3 (4, 3)	12	Defeated Jamin Olivencia and Chris Cage substituting for J.T. Dalton.	
76	Terminal Velocity (Chet Jablonski and Steve Lewington)	September 5, 2007	OVW TV Tapings	Louisville, KY	1 (2, 1)	21		
77	The James Boys (K.C. James and Kassidy James)	September 26, 2007	OVW TV Tapings	Louisville, KY	4 (5, 4)	10		
—	Vacated	October 6, 2007	OVW TV Tapings	Louisville, KY	—	—	Titles were stripped after a match, The James Boys attacked Terminal Velocity.	
78	Colt Cabana and Shawn Spears	November 7, 2007	OVW TV Tapings	Louisville, KY	1 (1, 3)	42	Defeated Paul Burchill and Stu Sanders in a tournament finals to win the vacant titles.	
79	Colt Cabana	December 19, 2007	OVW TV Tapings	Louisville, KY.	1	14	Cabana defeated Shawn Spears in a ladder match for control of the titles.	
80	Colt Cabana and Charles Evans	January 2, 2008	OVW TV Tapings	Louisville, KY	1 (2, 2)	<1	Cabana chose Charles Evans as his new partner.	
81	Paul Burchill and Stu Sanders	January 2, 2008	OVW TV Tapings	Louisville, KY	1	56		
82	Los Locos (Ramón and Raúl)	February 27, 2008	OVW TV Tapings	Louisville, KY	1	77	Defeated Paul Burchill and Stu Sanders, The Insurgency (Ali and Omar Akbar) and The Mobile Homers (Ted McNaler and Adam Revolver) in a fatal four-way match. Los Locos became the first OVW Southern Tag Team Champions since OVW and WWE parted ways.	
83	The Insurgency (Ali Akbar and Omar Akbar)	May 14, 2008	OVW TV Tapings	Louisville, KY	1	14		
84	The Men of Iron (Pat Buck and Rob Conway)	May 28, 2008	OVW TV Tapings	Louisville, KY	1 (1, 11)	70		
85	Darriel Kelly and Josh Lowry	August 6, 2008	OVW TV Tapings	Louisville, KY	1	35	This was a fatal four-way match also involving The Insurgency (Ali and Omar Akbar) and Dirty Money and Scott Cardinal.	
86	Apoc and Vaughn Lilas	September 10, 2008	OVW TV Tapings	Louisville, KY	1	49		
87	Dirty Money and Scott Cardinal	October 29, 2008	OVW TV Tapings	Louisville, KY	1	42		
88	Totally Awesome (Kamikaze Kid and Sucio)	December 10, 2008	OVW TV Tapings	Louisville, KY	1	49		
89	Dirty Money and Scott Cardinal	January 28, 2009	OVW TV Tapings	Louisville, KY	2	35		
90	Totally Awesome (Kamikaze Kid and Sucio)	March 4, 2009	OVW TV Tapings	Louisville, KY	2	28		
91	Fang and Igotta Brewski	April 1, 2009	OVW TV Tapings	Louisville, KY	1	21		
92	Top Shelf Talent (JD Maverick and Pat Buck)	April 22, 2009	OVW TV Tapings	Louisville, KY	1 (1, 2)	49		
93	Totally Awesome (Kamikaze Kid and Sucio)	June 10, 2009	OVW TV Tapings	Louisville, KY	3	7		
94	The Network (Andrew the Director and Benny the Producer)	June 17, 2009	OVW TV Tapings	Louisville, KY	1	102		
95	Big Men on Campus (Moose and Tilo)	September 27, 2009	OVW Fall Brawl	Louisville, KY	1	45	Defeated The Network in a four-team gauntlet match that also involved the Kamikaze Kid and DC, and Hog Wild and Kevin Hundley.	
96	Mike Mondo and Turcan Celik	November 11, 2009	OVW TV Tapings	Louisville, KY	1	7		
97	The Network (Andrew the Director and Benny the Producer)	November 18, 2009	OVW TV Tapings	Louisville, KY	2	84	Defeated Turcan Celik and Mike Mondo, Big Men on Campus and the Mobile Homers in a fatal four-way match.	
98	Benjamin Bray	February 10, 2010	OVW TV Tapings	Louisville, KY	1 (3)	7	Benjamin Bray defeated Andrew Lacroix for full control over the titles.	
99	Benjamin Bray and Andrew LaCroix	February 17, 2010	OVW TV Tapings	Louisville, KY	3 (4, 3)	35	Formerly known as The Network. Bray picked LaCroix as his partner over James the Saved.	
100	The Elite (Adam Revolver and Ted McNaler)	March 27, 2010	OVW Riot Act	Louisville, KY	1	157		
101	The Invincibles/Fighting Spirit (Fang and Sucio)	August 28, 2010	OVW Summer Scorcher	Louisville, KY	1 (2, 4)	103	During their reign, they changed their names to Fighting Spirit (Christopher Silvio and Raphael Constantine).	
102	The Elite (Adam Revolver and Ted McNaler)	December 9, 2010	Ring of Honor TV tapings	Louisville, KY	2	30		
103	Christopher Silvio and Ryan Nemeth	January 8, 2011	OVW TV Tapings	Louisville, KY	1 (5, 1)	25		
—	Vacated	February 2, 2011	OVW TV Tapings	Louisville, KY	—	—	Declared vacant after an attack on Ryan Nemeth by Fighting Spirit as the result of a victory by Nemeth over Raphael Constantine to determine who would be Silvio's partner.	
104	Paredyse and Ryan Nemeth	February 5, 2011	OVW Saturday Night Special	Louisville, KY	1 (4, 2)	28	Defeated Fighting Spirit in a Tag Team Elimination match. Paredyse previously known as Kamikaze Kid.	
105	Fighting Spirit (Christopher Silvio and Raphael Constantine)	March 5, 2011	OVW Saturday Night Special	Louisville, KY	2 (6, 3)	28		
106	The Elite (Adam Revolver and Ted McNaler)	April 2, 2011	OVW Saturday Night Special	Louisville, KY	3	74		
107	The Fat and The Furious (Mr. Black and Trailer Park Trash)	June 15, 2011	OVW TV Tapings	Louisville, KY	1 (4, 5)	52		
108	Bolin Services 2.0 (James "Moose" Thomas and Rocco Bellagio)	August 6, 2011	OVW Saturday Night Special	Louisville, KY	1 (2, 1)	18		
109	The Fat and The Furious (Mr. Black and Trailer Park Trash)	August 24, 2011	OVW TV Tapings	Louisville, KY	2 (5, 6)	10	Defeated James Thomas and Raúl LaMotta. Chris Bolin subbed Lamotta for Bellagio.	
110	The Elite (Adam Revolver and Ted McNaler)	September 3, 2011	OVW Saturday Night Special	Louisville, KY	4	91	Defeated The Fat and The Furious and James Thomas and Rocco Bellagio in a three-way match.	
111	OMG (Johnny Spade and Shiloh Jonze)	December 3, 2011	OVW Saturday Night Special	Louisville, KY	1	39	Defeated The Elite and James Onno and Tony Gunn in a three-way match.	
112	The Mascagni Family (Jessie Godderz and Marcus Anthony)	January 11, 2012	OVW TV Tapings	Louisville, KY	1	7		
113	OMG (Johnny Spade and Shiloh Jonze)	January 18, 2012	OVW TV Tapings	Louisville, KY	2	35		
114	The Family (Jessie Godderz, Rob Terry and Rudy Switchblade)	February 22, 2012	OVW TV Tapings	Louisville, KY	1 (2, 1, 1)	45	Godderz, Terry and Rudy Switchblade defeated Jonze and Jason Wayne (subbing for Spade) in a handicap match to win the titles. The three defended the titles under the "Family Rule".	
115	Los Locos (Anarquia and Raul LaMotta)	April 7, 2012	OVW Saturday Night Special	Louisville, KY	2	4	Defeated Jessie Godderz and Rudy Switchblade to win the titles.	
116	The Family/The Best Team Ever (Jessie Godderz and Rudy Switchblade)	April 11, 2012	OVW TV Tapings	Louisville, KY	2 (3, 2)	52	Godderz and Switchblade defeated Raul LaMotta in a handicap match to win the titles.	
117	Loco-MG (Raul LaMotta and Shiloh Jonze)	June 2, 2012	OVW Saturday Night Special	Louisville, KY	1 (3, 3)	4		
118	The Family/The Best Team Ever (Jessie Godderz and Rudy Switchblade)	June 6, 2012	OVW TV Tapings	Louisville, KY	3 (4, 3)	14		
—	Vacated	June 20, 2012	OVW TV Tapings	Louisville, KY	—	—	Stripped of the titles, by OVW Board of Directors member Ken Wayne, after referee Chris Sharpe allowed Godderz and Switchblade to cheat to win the titles.	
119	The Family/The Best Team Ever (Jessie Godderz and Rudy Switchblade)	July 7, 2012	OVW Saturday Night Special	Louisville, KY	4 (5, 4)	147	Defeated Brandon Espinosa and Paredyse in a ladder match to win the vacant title.	
120	The Gutcheckers (Alex Silva and Sam Shaw)	December 1, 2012	OVW Saturday Night Special	Louisville, KY	1	46		
121	The Coalition (Crimson and Jason Wayne)	January 16, 2013	OVW TV Tapings	Louisville, KY	1	42		
122	The Gutcheckers/New School (Alex Silva and Sam Shaw)	February 27, 2013	OVW TV Tapings	Louisville, KY	2	35		
123	The Coalition (Crimson and Jason Wayne)	April 3, 2013	OVW TV Tapings	Louisville, KY	2	84	This was a two-out-of-three falls match.	
124	Michael Hayes and Mohammed Ali Vaez	June 26, 2013	OVW TV Tapings	Louisville, KY	1 (1, 2)	164	Ali was known as Ali Akbar.	
125	The Mobile Homers (Adam Revolver and Ted McNaler)	December 7, 2013	OVW Saturday Night Special	Louisville, KY	5	21	Previously known as The Elite.	
126	Michael Hayes and Mohammed Ali Vaez	December 28, 2013	Live Event	Elizabethtown, KY	2 (2, 3)	63		
127	Dylan Bostic and The Mexicutioner	March 1, 2014	OVW Saturday Night Special	Louisville, KY	1	70	This was a two-on-one handicap tag team match.	
128	The Skywalkers (Aaron Sky and Robbie Walker)	May 10, 2014	OVW Saturday Night Special	Louisville, KY	1	56		
129	The Fabulous Free Bodies (The Bodyguy and Big Jon)	July 5, 2014	OVW Saturday Night Special	Louisville, KY	1	28		
130	Silvi-O-livencia (Chris Silvio and Jamin Olivencia)	August 2, 2014	OVW Saturday Night Special	Louisville, KY	1 (7, 2)	35		
131	War Machine (Eric Locker and Shiloh Jonze)	September 6, 2014	OVW Saturday Night Special	Louisville, KY	1 (1, 4)	56		
132	TerreMex (The Mexicutioner and Randy Terrez)	November 1, 2014	OVW Saturday Night Special	Louisville, KY	1 (2, 1)	42		
133	The Fabulous Free Bodies (The Bodyguy and Big Jon)	December 13, 2014	OVW 800th TV Episode	Louisville, KY	2	32		
134	TerreMex (The Mexicutioner and Randy Terrez)	January 14, 2015	OVW TV Tapings	Louisville, KY	2 (3, 2)	52		
135	Walk on the Wylde side (Adam Wylde and Robbie Walker)	March 7, 2015	OVW Saturday Night Special	Louisville, KY	1 (1, 2)	18		
136	War Machine (Eric Locker and Big Jon)	March 25, 2015	OVW TV Tapings	Louisville, KY	1 (2, 3)	105	This was a singles match between Big Jon and Adam Wylde.	
137	Wylde and Reckless (Adam Wylde and Robbie Walker)	July 8, 2015	OVW TV Tapings	Louisville, KY	2 (2, 3)	87	Formerly known as Walk on the Wylde Side.	
138	The Van Zandt Family Circus (Dapper Dan Van Zandt and The Ringmaster)	October 3, 2015	OVW Saturday Night Special	Louisville, KY	1	63		
139	Band of Brothaz (General Pope and Private Anthony)	December 5, 2015	OVW Saturday Night Special	Louisville, KY	1 (1, 2)	67	Anthony was previously known as Marcus Anthony.	
140	The Tag Buddies (Adam Revolver and Reverend Stuart Miles)	February 10, 2016	OVW TV Tapings	Louisville, KY	1 (6, 1)	94		
141	The Bad Boys Club (Randy Royal and Shane Andrews)	May 14, 2016	OVW Saturday Night Special	Louisville, KY	1	39		
142	The Tag Buddies (Adam Revolver and Reverend Stuart Miles)	June 22, 2016	OVW TV Tapings	Louisville, KY	2 (7, 2)	35		
143	The Van Zandt Family Circus (Dapper Dan Van Zandt and Mad Man Pondo)	July 27, 2016	OVW TV Tapings	Louisville, KY	1 (2, 1)	38		
144	Adam Revolver and The Mexicutioner	September 3, 2016	OVW Saturday Night Special	Louisville, KY	1 (8, 4)	4		
145	The Legacy of Brutality (Big Zo and Hy-Zaya)	September 7, 2016	OVW TV Tapings	Louisville, KY	1	70		
146	Big Jon and Elijah Burke	November 16, 2016	OVW TV Tapings	Louisville, KY	1 (4, 2)	17	Burke previously known as General Pope.	
147	Big Smooth (Big Jon and Justin Smooth)	December 3, 2016	OVW Saturday Night Special	Louisville, KY	1 (5, 1)	53	Smooth replaced Elijah Burke as Big Jon's tag partner.	
148	Team Next Level (Devin Driscoll and Tony Gunn)	January 25, 2017	OVW TV Tapings	Louisville, KY	1	42		
149	Billy O and Kevin Giza	March 8, 2017	OVW TV Tapings	Louisville, KY	1	38		
150	The Bad Boys Club (Randy Royal and Shane Andrews)	April 15, 2017	Live Event	Louisville, KY	2	88		
151	The Legacy of Brutality (Ca$h Flo and Dapper Dan)	July 12, 2017	OVW TV Tapings	Louisville, KY	1^{(2)} (1, 3)	52	Dapper Dan was previously known as Dapper Dan Van Zandt.	
152	The Top Guyz (Adam Slade and Kevin Giza)	September 2, 2017	OVW Saturday Night Special	Louisville, KY	1 (1, 2)	81		
153	The Bad Boys Club (Randy Royal and Shane Andrews)	November 22, 2017	OVW TV Tapings	Louisville, KY	3	73		
154	The Bro Godz (Colton Cage and Dustin Jackson)	February 3, 2018	OVW Saturday Night Special	Louisville, KY	1	28	Jessie Belle replaced Shane Andrews in the match.	
155	The Top Guyz (Adam Slade and Kevin Giza)	March 3, 2018	OVW Saturday Night Special	Louisville, KY	2 (2, 3)	18	Dimes replaced Colton Cage in the match.	
156	David Lee Lorenze III and Scott Cardinal	March 21, 2018	OVW TV Tapings	Louisville, KY	1 (2, 3)	42	This was a three-way tag team match, also involving The Bro Godz (Colton Cage and Dustin Jackson). Lorenze was previously known as The Ringmaster.	
157	The Bro Godz (Colton Cage and Dustin Jackson)	May 2, 2018	OVW TV Tapings	Louisville, KY	2	66		
158	David Lee Lorenze III and Shiloh Jonze	July 7, 2018	OVW Saturday Night Special	Louisville, KY	1 (3, 5)	4	This was a "Bronado" tag team match.	
159	The Bro Godz (Colton Cage and Dustin Jackson)	July 11, 2018	OVW TV Tapings	Louisville, KY	3	24		
160	War Kings (Crimson and Jax Dane)	August 4, 2018	OVW Saturday Night Special	Louisville, KY	1 (3, 1)	42		
161	The Bro Godz (Colton Cage and Dustin Jackson)	September 15, 2018	Live Event	Elizabethtown, KY	4	49		
162	War Kings (Crimson and Jax Dane)	November 3, 2018	OVW Saturday Night Special	Louisville, KY	2 (4, 2)	154		
163	Kings Ransom (Leonis Khan and Maximus Khan)	April 6, 2019	OVW Saturday Night Special	Louisville, KY	1	119		
164	The Legacy of Brutality (Big Zo, Ca$h Flo, Hy-Zaya and Jay Bradley)	August 3, 2019	OVW Saturday Night Special	Louisville, KY	1^{(3)} (2, 2, 2, 1)	101	Big Zo replaced Leonis Khan in the match. Ca$h Flo and Jay Bradley won the match, but Big Zo and Hy-Zaya were also recognized as champions under the Freebird Rule.	
165	Corey Storm and Dimes	November 12, 2019	OVW TV Tapings	Louisville, KY	1	81	Ca$h Flo and Jay Bradley represented The Legacy of Brutality.	
166	The Legacy of Brutality (Big Zo, Ca$h Flo, Hy-Zaya, Jay Bradley, and Steve Michaels)	February 1, 2020	OVW Saturday Night Special	Louisville, KY	2^{(4)} (3, 3, 3, 2, 1)	280	Big Zo and Hy-Zaya won the match, but Ca$h Flo, Jay Bradley, and Steve Michaels were also recognized as champions under the Freebird Rule. In their last defence against The Tate Twins, cagematch.de states that Josh Ashcraft was also allowed to defend, but it is currently unknown if he was recognized as an official champion.	
167	The Tate Twins (Brandon Tate and Brent Tate)	November 7, 2020	OVW Saturday Night Special	Louisville, KY	1	150	Ca$h Flo and Josh Ashcraft defended the titles in the match.	
168	The Pec-TacularGunns (Jessie Godderz and Tony Gunn)	April 6, 2021	OVW TV Tapings	Louisville, KY	1 (6, 2)	46		
169	The Tate Twins (Brandon Tate and Brent Tate)	May 22, 2021	OVW TV Tapings	Louisville, KY	2	98		
170	Darkkloudz (Deget Bundlez and Eric Darkstorm)	August 28, 2021	OVW Saturday Night Special - Reckoning 2021	Louisville, KY	1	87	This was a six-team ladder match also involving The Legacy Of Brutality (Big Zo and Steve Michaels), The Fanny Pack Party (Dustin Jackson and Kal Herro), The Box Office Blonds (Adam Swayze and Rex), and The Recusants (Brandon Espinosa and Tom Coffey).	
171	The Fanny Pack Party (Dustin Jackson and Kal Herro)	November 23, 2021	OVW TV Tapings	Louisville, KY	1 (5, 1)	79	This was also for The Party's Nightmare Cup.	
172	Darkkloudz (Deget Bundlez and Eric Darkstorm)	February 10, 2022	OVW TV Tapings	Louisville, KY	2	84	This was a two-on-one handicap match as only Dustin Jackson defended both titles.	
173	Bankroll (Ca$h Flo and Dimes)	May 5, 2022	OVW TV Tapings	Louisville, KY	1 (4, 2)	14		
174	The Pec-TacularGunns (Jessie Godderz and Tony Gunn)	May 19, 2022	OVW TV Tapings	Louisville, KY	2 (7, 3)	7	This was a four corners match also involving Darkkloudz (Deget Bundlez and Eric Darkstorm) and The Outrunners (Truth Magnum and Turbo Floyd).	
—	Vacated	May 26, 2022	OVW TV Tapings	Louisville, KY	—	—		
175	The Outrunners (Truth Magnum and Turbo Floyd)	June 2, 2022	OVW TV: All Systems Go	Louisville, KY	1 (6, 1)	23	Truth Magnum was previously known as Shiloh Jonze.	
176	Bankroll (Ca$h Flo and Dimes)	June 25, 2022	OVW Saturday Night Special: Independence Rage	Louisville, KY	2 (5, 3)	47		
177	The Fallen (D'Mone Solavino and Ronnie Roberts)	August 11, 2022	OVW TV #1200	Louisville, KY	1	105	This was a three way match also involving Level X (Axton Ray and Blanco Loco).	
178	Luscious Lawrence and Omar Amir	November 24, 2022	OVW TV Tapings	Louisville, KY	1	100		
179	The Outrunners (Truth Magnum and Turbo Floyd)	March 4, 2023	OVW Saturday Night Special: March Mayhem 2023	Louisville, KY	2 (7, 2)	82		
180	Derby City Destroyers (Big Zo and Gnarls Garvin)	May 25, 2023	OVW TV: All Systems Go	Louisville, KY	1 (4, 1)	107		
181	The Overmen (Joe Mack and Luke Kurtis)	September 9, 2023	OVW Saturday Night Special: Hard Reset	Louisville, KY	1	73		
182	Beaches and Cream (Luscious Lawrence and Omar Amir)	November 21, 2023	OVW TV: Thanksgiving Thunder	Louisville, KY	2	25	This was a three way match also involving Golden Lions (Ca$h Flo and Mahabali Shera).	
183	Golden Lions (Ca$h Flo and Mahabali Shera)	December 16, 2023	OVW Christmas Chaos 2023	Louisville, KY	1 (6, 1)	40	This was a three way match also involving The Overmen (Joe Mack and Luke Kurtis).	
184	The Overmen (Adam Revolver and Joe Mack)	January 25, 2024	OVW TV Tapings	Louisville, KY	1 (9, 2)	51		
—	Vacated	March 16, 2024	OVW March Mayhem 2024	Louisville, KY	—	—		
185	The Overmen (Adam Revolver and Beau Amir)	March 16, 2024	OVW March Mayhem 2024	Louisville, KY	1 (10, 1)	47	Defeated Tusk and Chains (Donovan Cecil and TW3) to win the vacant championship.	
186	Tusk and Chains (Donovan Cecil and TW3)	May 2, 2024	OVW Double Crossed	Louisville, KY	1	119	This was a three way match also involving Beaches and Cream (Luscious Lawrence and Omar Amir).	
187	The Revolution (AJZ and Dalton McKenzie)	August 29, 2024	OVW Rise HOMECOMING	Louisville, KY	1	49		
188	Kal Herro and Omar Amir	October 17, 2024	OVW TV Tapings	Louisville, KY	1 (2, 3)	14		
189	The Blockbusters (Jordan Sparkes and Toby St. John)	October 31, 2024	OVW TV: Halloween Hell Night	Louisville, KY	1	14	This was a Revolution Rules match that also involved AJZ and Star Rider.	
190	Beaches and Cream (Luscious Lawrence and Omar Amir)	November 14, 2024	OVW TV Tapings	Louisville, KY	3 (3, 4)	135		
—	Vacated	March 29, 2025	OVW March Mayhem 2025	Louisville, KY	—	—		
191	Loud and Lawless (Jake Lawless and Von Rockit)	March 29, 2025	OVW March Mayhem 2025	Louisville, KY	1	40	Defeated The Revolution (AJZ and Leo Fox) to win the vacant titles.	
192	The Trifecta (Ashton Adonis and Brandon Barretta)	May 8, 2025	OVW TV Tapings	Louisville, KY	1	101		
193	Donovan Cecil and Jack Vaughn	August 11, 2025	OVW Fight Night 2025	Louisville, KY	1 (2, 1)	4		
194	The Trifecta (Ashton Adonis and Brandon Barretta)	August 21, 2025	OVW TV Tapings	Louisville, KY	2	14		
—	Vacated	September 11, 2025	OVW: Rise LIVE	Louisville, KY	—	—	Titles vacated after owner Al Snow confirmed The Trifecta vs Level 3 match was not sanctioned.	
195	Anthony Toatele and Dustin Jackson	September 28, 2025	OVW No Rest for the Wicked 2025	Louisville, KY	1 (1, 6)	25	Won vacant titles against Donovan Cecil and Jack Vaughn upon Nightmare Cup tournament victory.	
196	Los Desafios (Jota Peso and Maximo Suave)	October 23, 2025	OVW TV Tapings	Louisville, KY	1	7		
197	Donovan Cecil and Jack Vaughn	October 30, 2025	OVW Hell Night 2025	Louisville, KY	2 (3, 2)	23	This was a Hateful Eight match that also involved Anthony Toatele and Dustin Jackson and Z Force (Kid Colossus and Super Z).	
198	The Evans Family (Drew Hernandez and Tony Evans)	November 22, 2025	OVW TV: Thanksgiving Thunder	Louisville, KY	1	12	Aired on tape delay on November 27, 2025.	
199	Donovan Cecil and Jack Vaughn	December 4, 2025	OVW TV	Louisville, KY	3 (4, 3)	73		
200	Los Desafios (Jota Peso and Maximo Suave)	February 15, 2026	OVW Tough Love 2026	Louisville, KY	2	28		
201	The Troublemakers (Canaan Kristopher and Glenn Spectre)	March 15, 2026	OVW March Mayhem 2026	Louisville, KY	1	30	This was a ladder match.	
202	Z Force (Kid Colossus and Super Z)	April 14, 2026	OVW Double Crossed 2026	Louisville, KY	1	58		
203	Only Bros (Boy Toy Troy and Star Player Prime)	June 11, 2026	OVW TV	Louisville, KY	1	65	This was a four corners match also involving The Trifecta (Jake Lawless and Jake Painter) and Sin City Outlaws (Luke Hartman and Mad Dog Martin).	
204	Damn OGs (Adam Revolver and Tony Gunn)	August 15, 2026	OVW Race for the Crown 2026	Cincinnati, OH	1 (11, 4)	98+		

== Combined reigns ==
As of November 21, 2026.

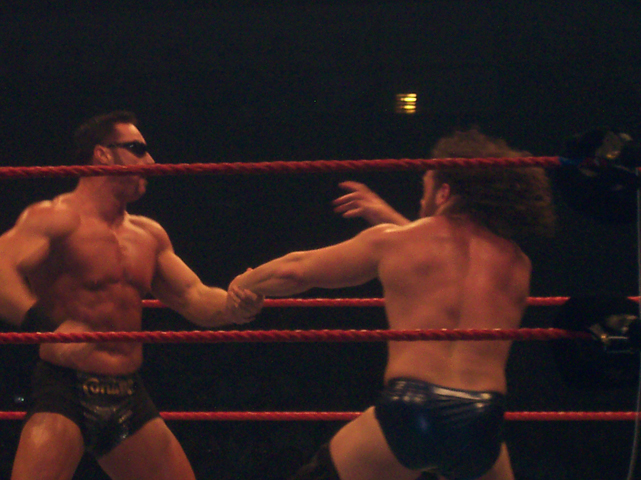
Rob Conway (left) and Nick Dinsmore (right), record ten-time champions

=== By team ===
†	Indicates the current champion

Rank	Team	No. of reigns	Combined days
1	The Legacy Of Brutality (1st reign: Big Zo and Hy-Zaya) (2nd reign: Ca$h Flo and Dapper Dan) (Reigns 3–4: Big Zo, Ca$h Flo, Hy-Zaya and Jay Bradley)	4	503
2	The Elite/The Mobile Homers (Ted McNaler and Adam Revolver)	5	373
3	Beaches and Cream (Luscious Lawrence and Omar Amir)	3	260
4	The Family/The Best Team Ever (1st reign: Jessie Godderz, Rob Terry and Rudy Switchblade) (Reigns 2–4: Jessie Godderz and Rudy Switchblade)	4	258
5	The Tate Twins (Brandon Tate and Brent Tate)	2	248
6	Michael Hayes and Mohammed Ali Vaez	2	227
7	The Network (Andrew LaCroix and Benjamin Bray)	3	224
8	The Bad Boys Club (Randy Royal and Shane Andrews)	3	200
9	The Lords of the Ring (Nick Dinsmore and Rob Conway)	10	199
10	War Kings (Crimson and Jax Dane)	2	196
11	The Blonde Bombers (Chad and Tank Toland)	1	183
12	The Dogg Pound (Redd Dogg and Shelton Benjamin)	1	175
13	The Overmen (1st reign: Joe Mack and Luke Kurtis) (2nd reign: Adam Revolver and Joe Mack) (3rd reign: Adam Revolver and Beau Amir)	3	171
13	Darkkloudz (Deget Bundlez and Eric Darkstorm)	2	171
15	Cody Runnels and Shawn Spears	2	168
16	The Bro Godz (Colton Cage and Dustin Jackson)	4	167
17	War Machine (1st reign: Eric Locker and Shiloh Jonze) (2nd reign: Big Jon and Eric Locker)	2	161
18	The Suicide Blondes (Jason Lee and Rip Rogers)	1	148
19	Aaron Stevens and Nova	1	146
20	Flash Flanagan and Trailer Park Trash	3	145
21	The Minnesota Stretching Crew (Brock Lesnar and Shelton Benjamin)	3	135
22	Adrenaline (Chris Cage and Tank Toland)	3	133
23	Fighting Spirit/The Invincibles (Christopher Silvio and Raphael Constantine)	2	131
24	The Tag Buddies (Adam Revolver and Reverend Stuart Miles)	2	129
25	The Coalition (Crimson and Jason Wayne)	2	126
26	David C. and Jason Lee	2	125
27	Chet Jablonski and Seth Skyfire	1	119
27	Kings Ransom (Leonis Khan and Maximus Khan)	1	119
27	Tusk and Chains (Donovan Cecil and TW3)	1	119
30	Mac Johnson and Seth Skyfire	2	116
31	The Trifecta (Ashton Adonis and Brandon Barretta)	2	115
32	The Paynethrillers (B.J. Payne and Scotty Sabre)	3	110
33	Derby City Destroyers (Big Zo and Gnarls Garvin)	1	107
34	The Outrunners (Truth Magnum and Turbo Floyd)	2	105
34	Walk on the Wylde side/Wylde and Reckless (Adam Wylde and Robbie Walker)	2	105
34	The Fallen (D'Mone Solavino and Ronnie Roberts)	1	105
37	The Untouchables (Deuce and Domino)	3	101
38	Basham Brothers (Damaja and Doug Basham)	1	100
38	The Disciples of Synn (Damian and Slash)	2	100
38	Donovan Cecil and Jack Vaughn	3	100
41	The Top Guyz (Adam Slade and Kevin Giza)	2	99
42	Damn OGs † (Adam Revolver and Tony Gunn)	1	98+
43	TerreMex (The Mexicutioner and Randy Terrez)	2	94
44	Brent Albright and Chris Masters	1	91
45	Jebediah Blackhawk and Cousin Otter	2	90
46	Totally Awesome (Kamikaze Kid and Sucio)	3	84
47	The Thrillseekers (Johnny Jeter and Matt Cappotelli)	1	83
48	The Gutcheckers/New School (Alex Silva and Sam Shaw)	2	81
48	Los Locos (Anarquia and Raul LaMotta)	2	81
48	Corey Storm and Dimes	1	81
51	The Fanny Pak Party (Dustin Jackson and Kal Herro)	1	79
52	B.J. Payne and Flash Flanagan	1	78
53	Dirty Money and Scott Cardinal	2	77
54	Bolin Services (The Prototype and Rico Constantino)	1	75
55	OMG (Johnny Spade and Shiloh Jonze)	2	74
56	Dylan Bostic and The Mexicutioner	1	70
56	The Men of Iron (Pat Buck and Rob Conway)	1	70
58	Band of Brothaz (Private Anthony and General Pope)	1	67
59	MNM (Joey Matthews and Johnny Nitro)	1	66
60	The Disciples of Synn (B.J. Payne and Damian)	2	65
60	Bolin Services (Charles Evans and Justin LaRouche)	1	65
60	Only Bros (Boy Toy Troy and Star Player Prime)	1	65
63	Cryme Tyme (JTG and Shad Gaspard)	2	63
63	The Van Zandt Family Circus (Dapper Dan Van Zandt and The Ringmaster)	1	63
65	The Fat and The Furious (Mr. Black and Trailer Park Trash)	2	62
66	Bankroll (Ca$h Flo and Dimes)	2	61
67	The Fabulous Free Bodies (The Bodyguy and Big Jon)	2	60
68	Z Force (Kid Colossus and Super Z)	1	58
69	Paul Burchill and Stu Sanders	1	56
69	The Skywalkers (Aaron Sky and Robbie Walker)	1	56
71	The James Boys (K.C. and Kassidy James)	4	54
72	The Pec-TacularGunns (Jessie Godderz and Tony Gunn)	2	53
72	Big Smooth (Big Jon and Justin Smooth)	1	53
74	Kasey James and Roadkill	1	52
75	The A.P.A. (Bradshaw and Ron Simmons)	1	50
76	Apoc and Vaughn Lilas	1	49
76	The Revolution (AJZ and Dalton McKenzie)	1	49
76	Top Shelf Talent (JD Maverick and Pat Buck)	1	49
79	Jebediah Blackhawk and Trailer Park Trash	1	48
80	Big Men on Campus (Moose and Tilo)	1	45
81	Bryan Cash and Juan Hurtado	1	44
82	Bolin Services (Mr. Black and Bull Buchanan)	1	43
83	Colt Cabana and Shawn Spears	1	42
83	David Lee Lorenze III and Scott Cardinal	1	42
83	Team Next Level (Devin Driscoll and Tony Gunn)	1	42
86	The Suicide Blondes (Derrick King and Jason Lee)	2	41
87	Golden Lions (Ca$h Flo and Mahabali Shera)	1	40
87	Loud and Lawless (Jake Lawless and Von Rockit)	1	40
89	Bolin Services (Chris Cage and The Miz)	1	39
90	Billy O and Kevin Giza	1	38
90	The Van Zandt Family Circus (Dapper Dan Van Zandt and Mad Man Pondo)	1	38
92	The Disciples of Synn (Seven and Travis Bane)	1	36
93	Los Desafios (Jota Peso and Maximo Suave)	2	35
93	Darriel Kelly and Josh Lowry	1	35
93	Silvi-O-livencia (Chris Silvio and Jamin Olivencia)	1	35
96	Flash Flanagan and Nick Dinsmore	1	31
97	The Andretti Express (Guido and Vito Andretti)	1	30
97	The Troublemakers (Canaan Kristopher and Glenn Spectre)	1	30
99	Paredyse and Ryan Nemeth	1	28
100	Anthony Toatele and Dustin Jackson	1	25
100	Christopher Silvio and Ryan Nemeth	1	25
102	T.J. Dalton and Jamin Olivencia	1	23
103	Fang and Igotta Brewski	1	21
103	Terminal Velocity (Chet Jablonski and Steve Lewington)	1	21
105	Bolin Services 2.0 (James Thomas and Rocco Bellagio)	1	18
106	Dave the Rave and Rip Rogers	2	17
106	Big Jon and Elijah Burke	1	17
108	Damaja and David C.	2	16
109	The Blockbusters (Jordan Sparkes and Toby St. John)	1	14
109	Colt Cabana	1	14
109	Doug Basham and Flash Flanagan	1	14
109	The Insurgency (Ali Akbar and Omar Akbar)	1	14
109	Kal Herro and Omar Amir	1	14
109	The Major Brothers (Brett Major and Brian Major)	1	14
109	Steve Armstrong and Tracy Smothers	1	14
116	The Evans Family (Drew Hernandez and Tony Evans)	1	12
117	Benjamin Bray	1	7
117	Mike Mondo and Turcan Celik	1	7
117	The Mascagni Family (Jessie Godderz and Marcus Anthony)	1	7
120	CM Punk and Seth Skyfire	1	5
121	Adam Revolver and The Mexicutioner	1	4
121	David Lee Lorenze III and Shiloh Jonze	1	4
121	Loco-MG (Raul LaMotta and Shiloh Jonze)	1	4
124	Juan Hurtado and Dave the Rave	1	3
125	Charles Evans and Colt Cabana	1	<1

=== By wrestler ===
Rank	Wrestler	No. of reigns	Combined days
1	Adam Revolver †	11	721+
2	Big Zo	4	558
3	Ca$h Flo	6	534
4	Hy-Zaya	3	451
5	Jay Bradley	2	381
6	Ted McNaler	5	373
7	Crimson	4	322
8	Jessie Godderz	7	318
9	Tank Toland	4	315
10	Jason Lee	5	314
11	Shelton Benjamin	4	310
12	Sucio/Christopher Silvio	7	275
13	Omar Amir	4	274
14	Dustin Jackson	6	271
15	Rob Conway	11	269
16	Flash Flanagan	6	268
17	Luscious Lawrence	3	260
18	Rudy Switchblade	4	258
19	Trailer Park Trash	6	255
20	B.J. Payne	6	253
21	Brandon Tate	2	248
21	Brent Tate	2	248
23	Shiloh Jonze/Truth Magnum	7	243
24	Ali Akbar/Mohamed Ali Vaez	3	241
25	Seth Skyfire	4	240
26	Big Jon	5	235
27	Benny the Producer/Benjamin Bray	4	231
28	Nick Dinsmore	11	230
29	Michael Hayes	2	227
30	Andrew the Director/Andrew LaCroix	3	224
31	Donovan Cecil	4	219
32	Shawn Spears	3	210
33	Tony Gunn †	4	200+
34	Randy Royal	3	200
34	Shane Andrews	3	200
36	Jax Dane	2	196
37	Cousin Otter/Mr. Black	5	195
38	Chad Toland	1	183
39	Redd Dogg	1	175
40	Chris Cage	4	172
41	Deget Bundlez	2	171
41	Erik Darkstorm	2	171
43	Cody Runnels	2	168
43	The Mexicutioner	4	168
45	Colton Cage	4	167
46	Damian	4	165
46	Rip Rogers	3	165
48	Eric Locker	2	161
48	Robbie Walker	3	161
50	Dapper Dan/Dapper Dan Van Zandt	3	153
51	Fang/Raphael Constantine	3	152
52	Aaron Stevens	1	146
52	Nova	1	146
54	Dimes	3	142
55	David C.	4	141
56	Chet Jablonski	2	140
57	Jebediah Blackhawk	3	138
58	Kevin Giza	3	137
59	Brock Lesnar	3	135
60	Reverend Stuart Miles	2	129
61	Jason Wayne	2	126
62	Joe Mack	2	124
63	Leonis Khan	1	119
63	Maximus Khan	1	119
63	Pat Buck	2	119
63	Scott Cardinal	3	119
63	TW3	1	119
68	Damaja	3	116
68	Mac Johnson	2	116
70	Kamikaze Kid/Paredyse	4	115
70	Ashton Adonis	2	115
70	Brandon Barretta	2	115
73	Doug Basham	2	114
74	Scotty Sabre	3	110
75	David Lee Lorenze III/The Ringmaster	3	109
76	Gnarls Garvin	1	107
77	K.C. James	5	106
78	Adam Wylde	2	105
78	Turbo Floyd	2	105
78	D'Mone Solavino	1	105
78	Ronnie Roberts	1	105
82	Deuce	3	101
82	Domino	3	101
84	Jack Vaughn	3	100
84	Slash	2	100
86	Adam Slade	2	99
87	Randy Terrez	2	94
88	Kal Herro	2	93
89	Brent Albright	1	91
89	Chris Masters	1	91
91	Raúl/Raul LaMotta	3	85
92	Elijah Burke/General Pope	2	84
93	Johnny Jeter	1	83
93	Matt Cappotelli	1	83
95	Alex Silva	2	81
95	Anarquia	2	81
95	Corey Storm	1	81
95	Sam Shaw	2	81
99	Dirty Money	2	77
100	Rico Constantino	1	75
100	The Prototype	1	75
102	Johnny Spade	2	74
102	Marcus Anthony	2	74
104	Luke Kurtis	1	73
105	Dylan Bostic	1	70
106	Joey Matthews	1	66
106	Johnny Nitro	1	66
108	Charles Evans	2	65
108	Justin LaRouche	1	65
108	Boy Toy Troy	1	65
108	Star Player Prime	1	65
112	James "Moose" Thomas	2	63
112	JTG	2	63
112	Shad Gaspard	2	63
115	The Bodyguy	2	60
116	Jamin Olivencia	2	58
116	Kid Colossus	1	58
116	Super Z	1	58
119	Aaron Sky	1	56
119	Colt Cabana	2	56
119	Paul Burchill	1	56
119	Stu Sanders	1	56
123	Kassidy James	4	54
124	Justin Smooth	1	53
124	Ryan Nemeth	2	53
126	Roadkill	1	52
127	Bradshaw	1	50
127	Ron Simmons	1	50
129	AJZ	1	49
129	Apoc	1	49
129	Dalton McKenzie	1	49
129	JD Maverick	1	49
129	Vaughn Lilas	1	49
134	Beau Amir	1	47
134	Juan Hurtado	2	47
136	Rob Terry	1	45
136	Tilo	1	45
138	Bryan Cash	1	44
139	Bull Buchanan	1	43
140	Devin Driscoll	1	42
141	Derrick King	2	41
142	Jake Lawless	1	40
142	Von Rockit	1	40
144	Mahabali Shera	1	40
145	The Miz	1	39
146	Billy O	1	38
146	Mad Man Pondo	1	38
148	Seven	1	36
148	Travis Bane	1	36
150	Jota Peso	2	35
150	Maximo Suave	2	35
150	Darriel Kelly	1	35
150	Josh Lowry	1	35
154	Guido Andretti	1	30
154	Vito Andretti	1	30
154	Canaan Kristopher	1	30
154	Glenn Spectre	1	30
158	Anthony Toatele	1	25
159	T.J. Dalton	1	23
160	Igotta Brewski	1	21
160	Steve Lewington	1	21
162	Dave the Rave	3	20
163	Rocco Bellagio	1	18
164	Jordan Sparkes	1	14
164	Toby St. John	1	14
164	Brett Major	1	14
164	Brian Major	1	14
164	Omar Akbar	1	14
164	Steve Armstrong	1	14
164	Tracy Smothers	1	14
171	Drew Hernandez	1	12
171	Tony Evans	1	12
173	Mike Mondo	1	7
173	Turcan Celik	1	7
175	CM Punk	1	5
