= Tennessee House of Representatives 45th district =

State legislative district in Tennessee

Tennessee's 45th State House of Representatives district
- Map of Tennessee House districts with the 45th District shaded in red
Representative
Johnny Garrett; R–Goodlettsville
- Demographics: 80.1% White; 8.1% Black; 5.7% Hispanic; 1.6% Asian; 0.5% Other; 3.9% Multiracial
- Population (2024): 70,448

The Tennessee House of Representatives 45th district is one of 99 legislative districts in the Tennessee House of Representatives. The district represents the south of Sumner County. The district includes the towns of Millersville, Goodlettsville, and Hendersonville.The southern border of the district is formed by Old Hickory Lake. It has been represented by Johnny Garrett since 2019.

== Demographics ==
The Tennessee Comptroller estimates the population as of 2024 at 70,448.

- 80.1% of the district is White
- 8.1% of the district is Black
- 5.7% of the district is Hispanic
- 1.6% of the district is Asian
- 0.5% of the district is some other race
- 3.9% of the district is Two or more races

Detailed demographic information is also available through Census Reporter.

== History ==
From the 88th Tennessee General Assembly, districts were numbered, at that time it was made up of parts of Davidson, Macon, Robertson, Sumner and Trousdale Counties. Since the 93rd GA, it has been southern Sumner county.

== List of representatives ==
Representative	Party	Years of service	General Assembly	Residence
Brian Stewart	Republican	2026–present		
Johnny Garrett	Republican	2019–2026	111th-114th	Goodlettsville
Courtney Rogers	Republican	2013–2018	108th-110th	Goodlettsville
Debra Young Maggart	Republican	2005-2012	104th-107th	Goodlettsville
Diane Black	Republican	1999-2004	101st-103rd	Hendersonville
Randy Stamps	Republican	1989-1998	96th-100th	Hendersonville
Jack A. Long	Democratic	1987-1988	95th	Gallatin
C. Ray Clark	Republican	1981-1986	92nd-94th	Hendersonville
John M. Steinhauer	Democratic	1975-1980	89th-91st	Hendersonville
Lloyd McKelvy	Democratic	1973-1974	88th	Hendersonville
