= Anthony Mayweather =

American professional wrestler (born 1985)

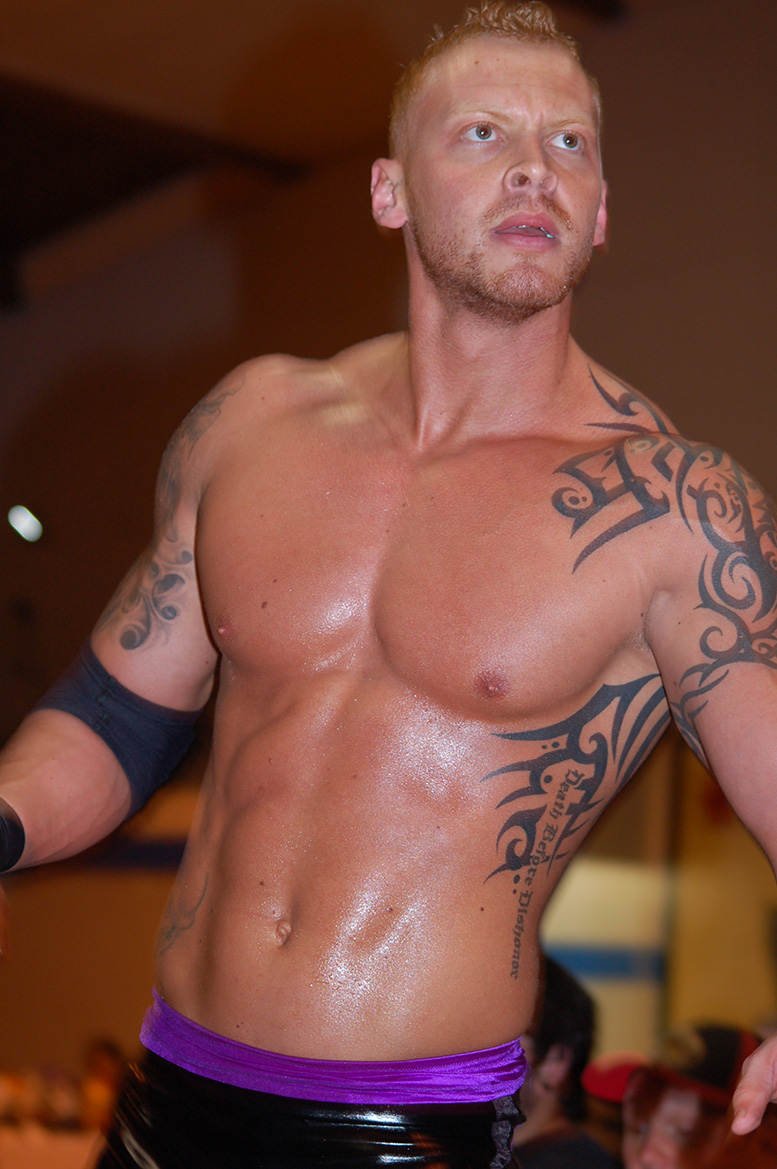
- Crimson in 2010

Personal information
- Born: Anthony Gregory Mayweather; February 21, 1985 (age 41) Cleveland, Ohio, U.S.
- Spouse: Heather Mayweather

Professional wrestling career
- Ring name(s): Crimson; Little Red; Mayweather; Tommy Mercer; Anthony Mayweather
- Billed height: 6 ft 6 in (1.98 m)
- Billed weight: 252 lb (114 kg)
- Billed from: Cleveland, Ohio; The Brownsville section of Brooklyn, New York
- Trained by: Jeff Daniels; Harley Race
- Debut: 2007

Anthony Gregory Mayweather (born February 21, 1985) is an American professional wrestler and promoter, currently signed to the NWA where he competes under his real name. In 2010, he signed with Total Nonstop Action Wrestling (TNA) as Crimson, where he achieved a 470-day undefeated streak, which lasted until June 2012. Afterwards, he spent time in TNA's developmental territory Ohio Valley Wrestling (OVW), where he became a one-time OVW Heavyweight Champion and a two-time OVW Southern Tag Team Champion, before being released from his contract in July 2013. He has since made several returns to TNA, most recently in April 2017, using the ring name Mayweather. Mayweather served five years in the United States Army, which included two tours of Iraq as part of Operation Iraqi Freedom. He made his professional wrestling debut in 2007, working under the ring name Tommy Mercer for various promotions on the independent circuit, including Absolute Intense Wrestling (AIW), NWA Main Event and Showtime All-Star Wrestling (SAW). He runs his own wrestling promotion, Tried-N-True Wrestling, based in Tennessee, which has been loosely affiliated with the National Wrestling Alliance since autumn 2017.

== Early life ==
Mayweather was born and raised by a single mother in Cleveland, Ohio. He attended North Ridgeville High School, where he played football and basketball, but wasn't able to continue to pursue a career in either of them without an athletic scholarship. After graduation Mayweather joined the United States Army in order to fund his college studies. He ended up serving for five years, which included two tours of Iraq in the 101st Airborne Division as part of Operation Iraqi Freedom.

== Professional wrestling career ==
=== Early career (2007–2010) ===
During his second tour of Iraq, Mayweather decided to pursue a career in professional wrestling and upon his return to the United States, entered the NWA Main Event wrestling school in Clarksville, Tennessee, where he was trained by Jeff Daniels. He would make his professional wrestling debut in 2007, working for independent promotions in Nashville, Tennessee under the ring name "Tommy Mercer". He would eventually make his debut also for NWA Main Event, starting a storyline rivalry with his trainer Jeff Daniels. On June 3, 2010, Mercer won his first professional wrestling championship, when he defeated Matt Boyce for the NWA Mid-American Television Championship. On October 10, 2009, Mercer wrestled in a six–way pre-show match at a Ring of Honor (ROH) event in Indianapolis, Indiana.

Mercer worked for Absolute Intense Wrestling (AIW) from December 2009 until December 2010. On February 29, 2010, Mercer took part in a thirty-man Gauntlet for the Gold to determine the new AIW Absolute Champion. The match ended with Mercer, Facade, Johnny Gargano and SJK all tumbling over the top rope at the same time, setting up a four-way decision match for Absolution 5. On April 9, Mercer formed Team No Mercy with Chris Dickinson and Toby Klein to take part in the Jack of All Trios tournament; the team was eliminated in the quarterfinals by The Young Studs (Bobby Beverly, Eric Ryan and TJ Dynamite). On June 27, Mercer was defeated by Johnny Gargano in the four-way decision match for the AIW Absolute Championship. Mercer made his final AIW appearance on December 17, unsuccessfully challenging Gargano for the AIW Absolute Championship.

Mercer also worked for Showtime All-Star Wrestling (SAW), where he received shots at Chase Stevens' SAW International Heavyweight Championship, however, both matches ended in a no contest. After the title was vacated, Mercer entered a tournament to determine the new champion. On June 11, 2011, Mercer was eliminated from the tournament, when his semifinal match against Chase Stevens ended in a double countout. Mercer would finally get the better of Stevens on October 8, when he was victorious in a Last Man Standing match, which would turn out to be his final match for the promotion.

=== Total Nonstop Action Wrestling ===
==== Undefeated streak (2010–2012) ====
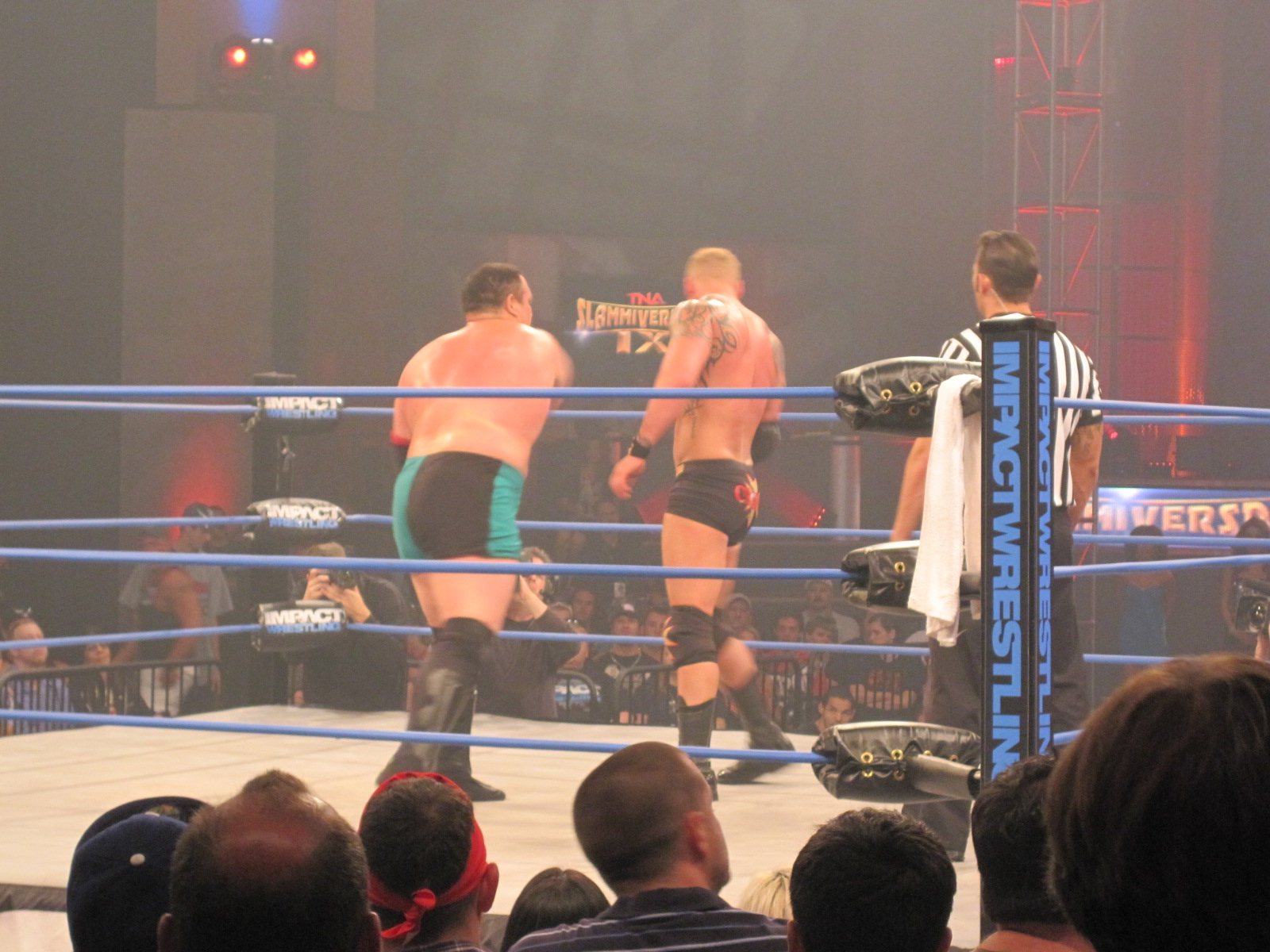
Crimson facing Samoa Joe at Slammiversary IX

In 2010, Mercer wrestled two tryout dark matches for Total Nonstop Action Wrestling (TNA), in a losing effort against Jay Lethal. and Stevie Richards. On December 4, 2010, Mercer took part in the TNA Gut Check Challenge tryout workshop in Orlando, Florida and two days later wrestled his third dark match for the promotion, in which he defeated Neico. On December 10, 2010, it was reported that TNA had signed Mercer to a contract. He would make his televised debut on the December 30 episode of Impact!, portraying Amazing Red's younger brother and being billed as "Little Red". The previous week Jeff Jarrett had defeated Amazing Red in his $100,000 mixed martial arts challenge series and upon hearing that he had a younger brother, challenged him to a match, expecting someone even smaller than the 5 ft 6 in (1.68 m) Red. Mercer dominated his debut match, before Jarrett's security guards, Gunner and Murphy, pulled their boss out of the ring and prevented him from re–entering. On the January 13 episode of Impact! Mercer, now renamed "Crimson", returned, attacking Abyss backstage and promising that "they" would be coming to take out Immortal on February 3. The following week, Crimson repeated his actions from the previous week, this time attacking A.J. Styles. Later that night, he saved Kurt Angle from Immortal by attacking Abyss with Janice, his nail-covered board, and sidelining him with a storyline injury.

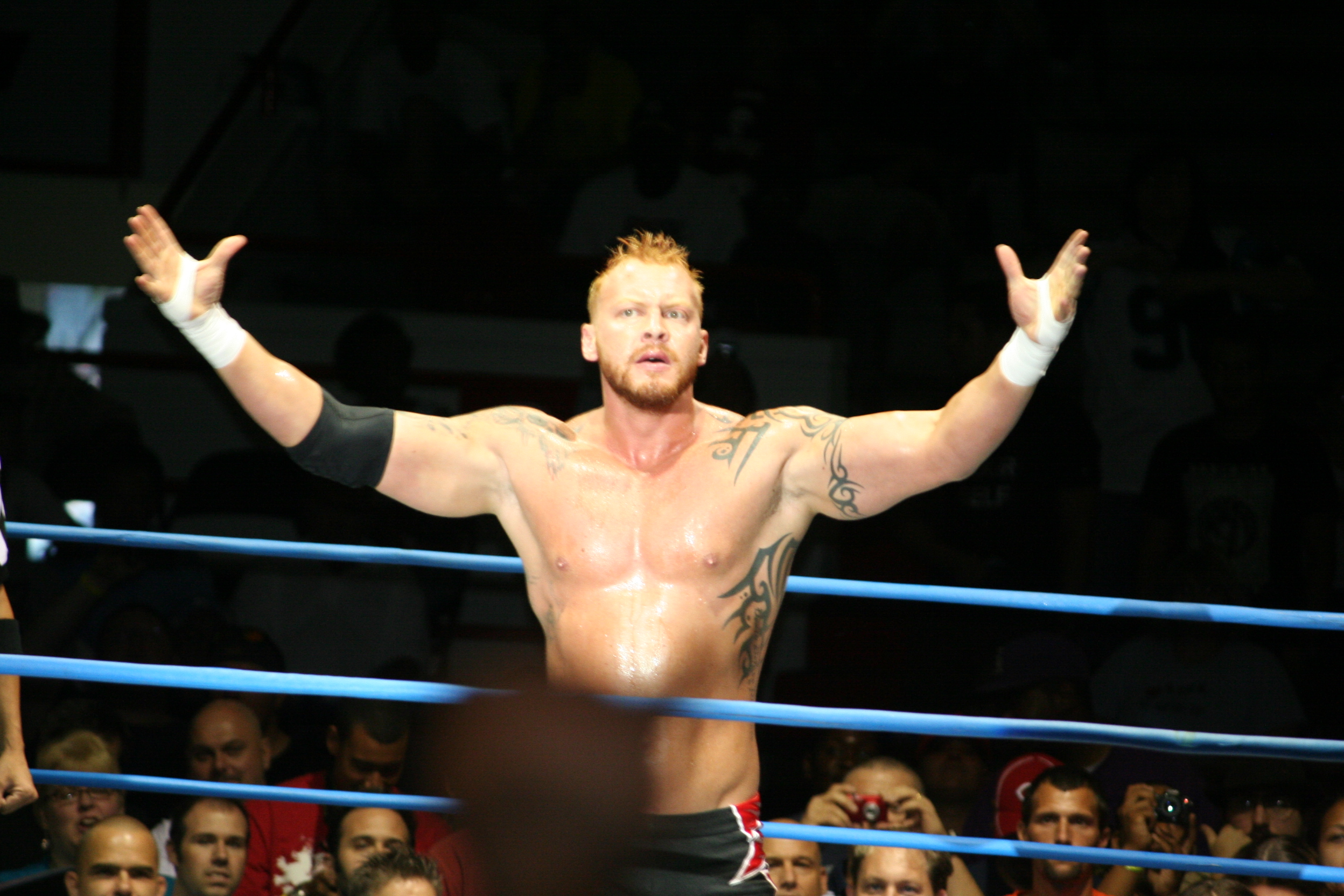
Crimson at a TNA live event in July 2011

On the January 27 episode of Impact!, Crimson explained that he was no longer by Amazing Red's side, because he had been given an offer he couldn't refuse. Later that night Crimson and Angle were placed in a seven–on–two handicap match against Immortal and Fortune members Jeff Jarrett, James Storm, Robert Roode, Kazarian, Rob Terry, Gunner and Murphy. The match ended with Jarrett pinning Angle for the win. Afterwards, Crimson and Angle were saved by the returning Scott Steiner. On the February 3 episode of Impact!, Fortune turned on Immortal, revealing themselves as the "they" Crimson and Angle had been referring to. Crimson made his pay-per-view debut on April 17 at Lockdown, where he and Scott Steiner were unsuccessful in becoming the number one contenders to the TNA World Tag Team Championship in a four tag team steel cage match, which was won by Ink Inc. (Jesse Neal and Shannon Moore). The following month at Sacrifice, Crimson defeated Abyss in a singles match to win the feud and keep his "undefeated streak" intact. Crimson then moved on to feuding with Samoa Joe, stemming from the fact that during the past three weeks, Joe had on two occasions turned his back and walked away from the ring, after Abyss had blindsided Crimson, claiming that he had not needed anyone's help during his own 18 month undefeated streak in 2005 and 2006. On June 12 at Slammiversary IX, Crimson continued his streak by defeating Samoa Joe. The following week Crimson entered the Bound for Glory Series to determine the number one contender to the TNA World Heavyweight Championship and continued his undefeated streak against the likes of D'Angelo Dinero, Bobby Roode and Bully Ray, taking over the number one spot in tournament standings. However, on the August 25 episode of Impact Wrestling, Samoa Joe attacked Crimson, suffering a storyline ankle injury, which forced him out of the Bound for Glory Series.

Crimson returned on the September 28 episode of Impact Wrestling, challenging Joe to a fight. During the fight, Joe slammed Crimson's injured ankle into a guardrail and locked him in a heel hook, before being run off by Matt Morgan. The following week Crimson defeated Joe in his return match. Crimson continued his undefeated streak on October 16 at Bound for Glory, defeating Samoa Joe and Matt Morgan in a three-way match. On November 13 at Turning Point, Crimson wrestled Morgan to a double disqualification, keeping his undefeated streak alive. On the following episode of Impact Wrestling, Crimson and Morgan defeated Mexican America (Anarquia and Hernandez) to win the TNA World Tag Team Championship. During the next month, Crimson and Morgan made successful title defenses against Anarquia and Hernandez in a rematch on the November 24 episode of Impact Wrestling, and against Devon and D'Angelo Dinero on December 11 at Final Resolution. On January 8, 2012, at Genesis, Crimson and Morgan made another successful title defense by defeating the team of Magnus and Samoa Joe. On February 12 at Against All Odds, Crimson and Morgan lost the TNA World Tag Team Championship to Magnus and Joe in a rematch. On the February 23 episode of Impact Wrestling, Crimson and Morgan failed to regain the TNA World Tag Team Championship from Magnus and Joe. Despite the problems between Crimson and Morgan, the two managed to defeat Robbie E and Robbie T on the March 8 episode of Impact Wrestling to once again become the number one contenders to the TNA World Tag Team Championship. During the title match against Magnus and Samoa Joe on March 18 at Victory Road, Crimson turned on Morgan, costing the team the match and turning heel in the process. On April 15 at Lockdown, Crimson defeated Morgan in a steel cage match to keep his undefeated streak alive. On the May 10 episode of Impact Wrestling, Crimson and Morgan were set to face each other in what was billed as their "final confrontation", however, before the match could start, Morgan was attacked by Bully Ray. After Morgan was stretchered away, Crimson was given a countout victory. Three days later at Sacrifice, Crimson defeated Eric Young in a singles match to keep his undefeated streak alive. On June 10 at Slammiversary, Crimson's 470-day undefeated streak ended, when the returning James Storm answered his open challenge and defeated him in a singles match.

==== Ohio Valley Wrestling (2012–2013) ====
Crimson returned on the July 5 episode of Impact Wrestling, unsuccessfully challenging Devon for the TNA Television Championship. After not appearing on Impact Wrestling for over a month, Crimson asked Al Snow to improve in TNA's developmental territory Ohio Valley Wrestling (OVW), making his debut on August 15, 2012. On September 1, Crimson won the Nightmare Rumble to become the number one contender to the OVW Heavyweight Championship. On September 12, Crimson defeated Johnny Spade to become the new OVW Heavyweight Champion. Crimson's first title program was with another TNA employee, Rob Terry, which built to title matches on October 10 and November 4, which both saw Crimson retain the OVW Heavyweight Championship. On December 1, Crimson lost the OVW Heavyweight Championship to Terry. Crimson then formed a stable named the Coalition Forces with Jack Black, Jason Wayne, Joe Coleman, Raul LaMotta and Shiloh Jonze and began being referred to as "General" Crimson. On January 16, 2013, Crimson and "General" Jason Wayne won the OVW Southern Tag Team Championship by defeating Alex Silva and Sam Shaw. Crimson and Wayne lost the title back to Silva and Shaw on February 27, before regaining it from them on April 3. Crimson's and Wayne's second reign ended on June 26, when they lost the title to Michael Hayes and Mohammed Ali Vaez. Crimson returned to Impact Wrestling on June 13, claiming that he had been sent home for a year after his 470-day undefeated streak had ended. He then proceeded to lose to Joseph Park in a Bound for Glory Series qualifying match. On July 3, Mayweather was released from his TNA contract due to budget cuts. Despite his July 3 release from TNA, Crimson wrestled one more match for OVW on July 6, when he and Wayne failed in their attempt to regain the OVW Southern Tag Team Championship from Hayes and Vaez. He was then sidelined with a meniscus tear in his right knee.

=== Return to Impact Wrestling (2015, 2017) ===
On February 12, 2015, Crimson returned to TNA, losing to Samuel Shaw at a TNA Xplosion taping. Over the next days, Crimson also worked several One Night Only pay-per-view tapings. Crimson returned on the June 10, Destination X themed episode of Impact Wrestling, losing to Bram. During 2015, Crimson also took part in the TNA World Title Series, but failed to advance to the round of 16 after losing all of his matches in the "Future 4" group, which also included Eli Drake, Jessie Godderz, and Micah.

On the April 6, 2017, episode of Impact Wrestling, a vignette aired promoting Mayweather's return to the company now in a tag team called the "Veterans of War". On the April 20 Impact Wrestling, Mayweather, introducing himself by his real name, appeared in a vignette, where he talked about his life. The Veterans of War, made up of Mayweather and Wilcox, debuted on the April 27 Impact Wrestling with a win over Fallah Bahh and Mario Bokara. On May 18, Mayweather signed a contract with Impact Wrestling, but left the promotion on November 13, 2017.

=== Independent circuit (2013–present) ===
Mercer returned to SAW, now known as NWA Southern All-Star Wrestling, on September 6, 2013, defeating Hot Rod Biggs to become the new NWA Southern Heavyweight Champion. Crimson vacated the title on October 11 due to an injury. Also returned to AIW on April 25, 2014, when he, B. J. Whitmer and Jimmy Jacobs formed a stable named The Forgotten and attacked the AIW Tag Team Champions, the Jollyville Fuck-Its (Nasty Russ and T-Money).

On May 16, 2014, Crimson and Amazing Red defeated The Young Bucks (Matt and Nick Jackson) to win the House of Glory (HOG) promotion's Tag Team Championship. In December 2014, it was reported that Mayweather was taking part in a one-week tryout camp with WWE.

On the June 23, 2018 episode of OVW TV, Crimson made his return to Ohio Valley Wrestling (OVW) as a member of the War Kings along with Jax Dane defeating OVW Southern Tag Team Champions The Bro Godz (Colton Cage and Dustin Jackson) in a non-title match. On August 4, 2018, at OVW Saturday Night Special, War Kings defeated The Bro Godz (Colton Cage and Dustin Jackson) to become the OVW Southern Tag Team Champions.

On February 12, 2022, at NWA PowerrrTrip, Mayweather defeated Chris Adonis to become the new NWA National Champion.

== Other media ==
In 2011, Mayweather made his acting debut, playing the role of Sherman in the film Chained: Code 207.

== Personal life ==
Outside of his career in professional wrestling, Mayweather has worked as a personal trainer and attended classes in business management at Austin Peay State University. In July 2022, Crimson was reportedly spotted doing security at a Donald Trump rally in Alaska.

=== Legal issues ===
In April 2016, Mayweather was arrested for domestic assault after allegedly head-butting his wife.

In March 2023, Mayweather was arrested for violating an order of protection. Police conducted a welfare check on February 24, and it was found that Mayweather had made several calls to his juvenile son's phone and sent several text messages to his wife, Heather Mayweather, even while police were present.

== Championships and accomplishments ==
- Continental Wrestling Entertainment
  - CWE Heavyweight Championship (1 time)
- Great American Wrestling
  - GAW Championship (1 time)
- House of Glory
  - HOG Tag Team Championship (1 time) – with Amazing Red
- National Wrestling Alliance
  - NWA National Championship (1 time)
- NWA Main Event
  - NWA Mid-American Television Championship (1 time)
- NWA Southern All-Star Wrestling
  - NWA Southern Heavyweight Championship (1 time)
- Ohio Valley Wrestling
  - OVW Heavyweight Championship (1 time)
  - OVW Southern Tag Team Championship (4 times) – with Jason Wayne (2) and Jax Dane (2)
  - Nightmare Rumble (2012)
- Pro Wrestling Illustrated
  - Ranked No. 41 of the top 500 singles wrestlers of the year in the PWI 500 in 2012
- Throwback Championship Wrestling
  - TCW Knoxville Unified Heavyweight Championship (1 time)
- Total Nonstop Action Wrestling
  - TNA World Tag Team Championship (1 time) – with Matt Morgan
- United States Wrestling Organization
  - USWO Southern Championship (1 time)
- Wrestling Observer Newsletter
  - Most Overrated (2011)
