= NWA Television Championship (SAW) =

Details
- Promotion: NWA Southern All-Star Wrestling; National Wrestling Alliance
- Current champion: Jason Fitzpatrick
- Date won: September 10, 2022

Other names
- SAW Television Championship; SAW International Heavyweight Championship
Statistics
- First champion: T.J. Harley
- Most reigns: Kid Kash (3 reigns)
- Longest reign: Kid Kash (462 days)
- Shortest reign: Shawn Schultz (33 days)

The NWA Television Championship is a title controlled by, and defended in NWA Southern All-Star Wrestling.

Southern All-star Wrestling later known as Showtime All-star Wrestling created the SAW Television Championship in 2007 then later changed its name to the SAW International Heavyweight Championship in June 2008. On March 15, 2013, the title was changed once again to the NWA Television Championship after SAW joined the NWA (National Wrestling Alliance) under the all new NWA SAW Branding.

== Title history ==
#	Wrestler	Reign	Date	Days held	Location	Notes
1	T.J. Harley	1	July 29, 2007	63		
2	Shawn Schultz	1	September 30, 2007	33	Millersville TN	Stripped on 11/02/2007
3	Arrick Andrews	1	November 2, 2007	42	Millersville, TN	Defeated Nore Havoc in tournament final
4	Nore Havoc	1	December 14, 2007	70	Millersville, TN	
5	Damian Adams	1	February 22, 2008	105	Millersville, TN	Later recognized as SAW International Heavyweight Title in June 2008
6	Kid Kash	1	June 6, 2008	98	Millersville, TN	
7	Jerry Lynn	1	September 12, 2008	57	Millersville, TN	
8	Kid Kash	2	November 8, 2008	462	Millersville, TN	Title moves to Showtime All-star Wrestling when the promotion splits in 2009
9	Chase Stevens	1	February 13, 2010	251	Nashville, TN	
10	Phil Shatter	1	October 22, 2010	183	Nashville, TN	Vacated on 04/23/11
-	Vacated	—	April 23, 2011	—	Millersville, TN	
12	Kid Kash	3	June 11, 2011	119	Gallatin, TN	Defeated Chris Michaels in tournament final
13	Reno Riggins	1	October 8, 2011	24	Old Hickory, TN	Vacated in November 2011
-	Vacated	—	November 2011	—	Old Hickory, TN	
14	Vordell Walker	1	January 7, 2012	399	Old Hickory, TN	Defeated Chase Stevens in tournament final; promotion merged back to Southern All-star Wrestling in December 12
15	Chris Michaels	1	February 9, 2013	265	Millersville, TN	Stripped of the SAW International Title and awarded NWA Television Title on 03/15/2013
16	Shawn Shultz	2	November 1, 2013	93	Millersville, TN	
17	Jeremiah Plunkett	2	March 14, 2014	252	Millersville, TN	
18	Drew Haskins	1	November 21, 2014	77	Millersville, TN	
19	Ali Shabazz	1	February 6, 2015	155	Millersville, TN	
20	Shawn Shultz	3	July 11, 2015	189	Cookeville, TN	
21	Jeremiah Plunkett	2	Jan 16, 2016	252+	Lebanon, TN	
22	Jason Fitzpatrick	1	September 10, 2022	1,093	Rockwood, TN	

== List of Combined Reigns ==
As of September 7, 2025

=== By Wrestler ===
	Indicates the current champions
+	Indicates the current reign is changing daily
(-)	Indicates that the combined total is less than one day.

Rank	Wrestler	# of reigns	Combined days
1.	Kid Kash	3	679
2.	Vordell Walker	1	399
3.	Chris Michaels	1	265
4.	Jeremiah Plunkett	2	252+
5.	Chase Stevens	1	251
6.	Phil Shatter	1	183
7.	Shawn Schultz	3	167
8.	Damian Adams	1	105
9.	Nore Havoc	1	70
10.	T.J. Harley	1	63
11.	Jerry Lynn	1	57
12.	Arrick Andrews	1	42
