= NWA Southern Heavyweight Championship (SAW) =

Professional wrestling championship

Details
- Promotion: NWA Southern All-Star Wrestling; National Wrestling Alliance
- Current champion(s): The Southern Rebel Denny Ray
- Date won: December 10, 2022

Other name(s)
- SAW Southern Heavyweight Championship

The NWA Southern Heavyweight Championship is a title controlled by, and defended in NWA Southern All-Star Wrestling.

Southern All-star Wrestling created the SAW Southern Heavyweight Championship in 2010 then later changed its name to the NWA Southern Heavyweight Championship in December 2012 after SAW joined the NWA (National Wrestling Alliance) under the all new NWA SAW Branding.

== Title history ==
#	Wrestler	Reign	Date	Days Held	Location	Notes
1	Rick Santel	1	January 1, 2010	49	Millersville TN	Defeated Arrick Andrews and Gary Valiant in 3-way match to become the first champion
2	Arrick Andrews	1	February 19, 2010	77	Millersville TN	
3	Chris Michaels	1	May 7, 2010	7	Millersville, TN	
4	Derek Neal	1	May 14, 2010	7	Millersville, TN	
5	Chris Michaels	2	May 21, 2010	140	Millersville, TN	
6	Hammerjack	1	October 8, 2010	70	Millersville, TN	
7	Lonestar	1	December 17, 2010	43	Millersville, TN	
8	Hammerjack	2	January 29, 2011	174	Nashville, TN	
9	Derek Neal	2	July 22, 2011	41	Millersville, TN	
10	Hammerjack	3	September 1, 2011	342	Millersville, TN	
11	Derek Neal	3	August 8, 2012	9	Millersville, TN	
12	Allen Shepard	1	August 17, 2012	42	Millersville, TN	
13	Dyron Flynn	1	September 28, 2012	56	Millersville, TN	Wins 3-way match against Shepard and Arrick Andrews
14	Wolfie D	1	November 23, 2012	78	Millersville, TN	Reigning SAW Southern Heavyweight Champion, recognized as NWA Southern Heavyweight Champion after SAW becomes an NWA licensee in 12/12
-	Vacated	—	February 22, 2013	—	Millersville, TN	Stripped on February 22, 2013 for missing a scheduled title defense, due to back injury
15	Shane Williams	1	February 22, 2013	14	Millersville, TN	Defeated Gary Valiant
16	Gary Valiant	1	March 8, 2013	7	Millersville, TN	
17	Jocephus Brody	1	March 15, 2013	28	Millersville, TN	
18	Gary Valiant	2	April 12, 2013	77	Millersville, TN	
19	Hot Rod Biggs	1	June 28, 2013	70	Millersville, TN	Defeated Valiant, Hammerjack, and Brody in 4-way match
20	Crimson	1	September 6, 2013	35	Millersville, TN	
-	Vacated	—	October 11, 2013	—	Millersville, TN	Vacated the title due to injury
21	Cliff Compton	1	November 1, 2013	63	Millersville, TN	Defeated Jocephus Brody in the tournament finals
22	Jocephus Brody	2	January 3, 2014	22	Millersville, TN	
23	Chase Owens	1	January 25, 2014	20	Millersville, TN	
24	Jason Kincaid	1	February 14, 2014	63	Millersville, TN	Defeated Chase Owens and Shawn Shultz in a Triple Title Turmoil match
25	Lance Erikson	1	April 18, 2014	7	Millersville, TN	
26	Arrick Andrews	2	April 25, 2014	161	Millersville, TN	
27	Shawn Hoodrich	1	October 3, 2014	35	Millersville, TN	
28	Arrick Andrews	3	November 7, 2014	3,574	Millersville, TN	
29	Greg Anthony	1	June 13, 2015	3,420		
29	Jeremiah Plunkett	1	November 14, 2015	3,420+	Nashville, TN	
30	Ryan Regal	1	May 3, 2017	2,884+	Franklin, TN	
31	Chris Classic	1	September 10, 2022	923+	Rockwood TN	
32	Vacated	1	September 15, 2022+	923+	Due to injury Chris Classic was stripped of championship	
32	Billy Havoc	1	September 17, 2022+	921+	Rockwood TN	Won championship in Battle Royal
33	The Southern Rebel Denny Ray	1	December 10, 2022+	837+	pigeon forge, TN	Beat Billy havoc in one on one match
