= Vordell Walker =

American professional wrestler (born 1982)

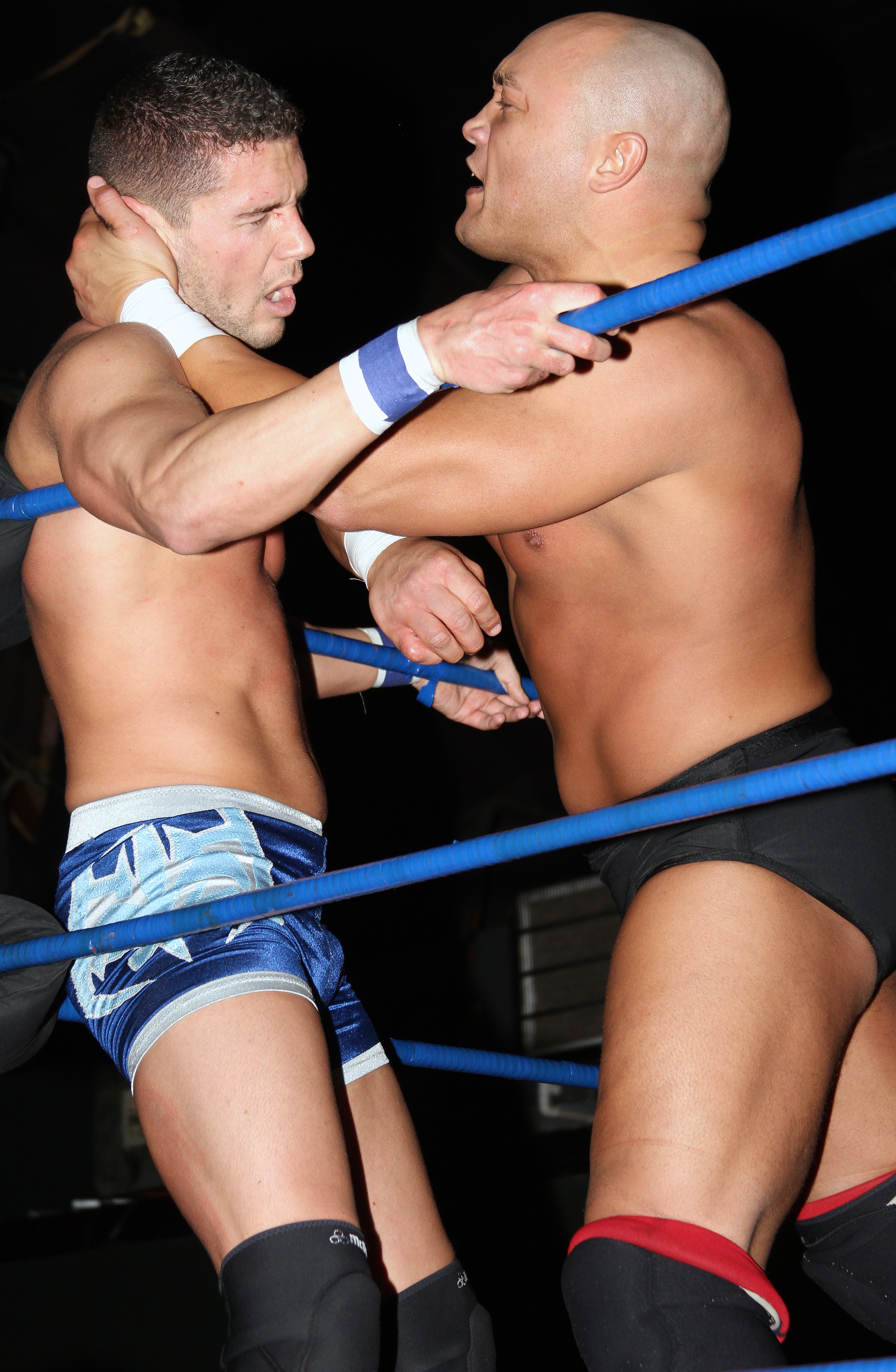
- Walker (right) in January 2012

Personal information
- Born: Edward Vordell Walker; 1982 (age 43–44) Savannah, Georgia

Professional wrestling career
- Ring name: Vordell Walker
- Billed height: 6 ft 0 in (1.83 m)
- Billed weight: 226 lb (103 kg)
- Trained by: Talon; Mastodon
- Debut: January 24, 2001

Edward Vordell Walker (born 1982) is an American professional wrestler, currently wrestling under the ring name Vordell Walker. He is perhaps best known for his work in Ring of Honor, Total Nonstop Action Wrestling and Pro Wrestling Extreme (PWX).

== Professional wrestling career ==
In 2004 Walker wrestled two matches for TNA Xplosion both in losing efforts to 3 Live Kru, and Héctor Garza. Throughout 2004 and 2005 Walker wrestled in NWA Florida and NWA Spinebuster competing against the likes of Tony Mamaluke, Matt Sydal, Billy Fives, Chris Sabin, and Homicide. He also competed in Full Impact Pro feuding with Jared Steel until mid-2005, he also competed in Ring of Honor, Georgia Championship Wrestling and Southern Championship Wrestling in 2005.

In 2005, Walker was involved in an altercation with veteran wrestler Rick Steiner. Steiner, known to be somewhat of a bully in the ring, began legitimately striking the much younger Walker, resulting in a somewhat shoot fight.

He wrestled a few matches in early 2006 until having reconstructive knee surgery in April. Walker defeated Kenny King in his return match at SCW Season's Beatings on December 2, 2006. In early 2007 Walker wrestled for AWA World 1 South, Dropkick Pro Wrestling, Showtime All-Star Wrestling, and Rampage Pro Wrestling. In early 2009 he competed against Ricky Steamboat Jr. for the NWA Charlotte promotion.

Vordell made it to the finals of the 2011 Shane Shamrock Cup.

On November 19, 2010, Walker debuted in the NWA Coastal wrestling federation to take on Bronco International. On December 12, 2010, Walker wrestled NWA World Heavyweight Champion Adam Pearce for NWA Gulf Coast. On December 14, 2010, Walker was 1 of 8 wrestlers trying to become the first NWA Ring Warriors Grand Champion.

Next, Walker wrestled for Pro Wrestling Xtreme at the National Guard Armory in Orlando, Florida. On January 28, 2012, Walker defeated Too Cold Scorpio to become the number 1 contender for the vacant Heavyweight Championship later that night. Walker lost in the Heavyweight championship match to Steve Corino. On April 28, 2012, Walker defeated Jon Davis. On July 28, 2012, Walker competed against his two previous vanquished opponents, Too Cold Scorpio and Jon Davis in a 60 Minute Iron Man Match.

Walker was a part of the 17th annual ECWA Super 8 tournament in Newark, Delaware, on April 13, 2013.

Walker defeated UFC/MMA legend Dan "The Beast" Severn at a Traditional Championship Wrestling event on September 6, 2013.

As of 2018, Walker continues to wrestle for various Louisiana-based independent wrestling promotions, including Pro Wrestling 225, where he recently issued a challenge to champion "Mad Dog" Gil Gracie. He recently had a tryout with WWE NXT but was not offered a contract.

== Personal life ==
Walker graduated from a technical school with a degree in marketing.

He also has a background in amateur wrestling and various forms of martial arts, such as judo, taekwondo and jujutsu.

== Championships and accomplishments ==
- AWA World-1 South
  - AWA World-1 South Tag Team Championship (1 time) - with Dagon Briggs
- Bayou Independent Wrestling
  - BIW Southern Championship (1 time)
- Coastal Championship Wrestling
  - CCW Southern States Championship (1 time)
- Elite Championship Wrestling
  - Elite Heavyweight Championship (1 time)
- Galaxie Pro Wrestling
  - GPW Cruiserweight Championship (1 time)
- G.O.U.G.E. Wrestling
  - G.O.U.G.E. North Carolina Championship (1 time)
- NWA Southern All-Star Wrestling
  - NWA National Heavyweight Championship (1 time)
  - SAW International Heavyweight Championship (1 time)
- Pro Wrestling 225
  - PW225 Heavyweight Championship (1 time)
- Pro Wrestling Fusion
  - PWF Bruiserweight Championship (1 time)
- South Georgia Wrestling Alliance
  - SGWA Tag Team Championship (1 time) - with Zero
- Southern Championship Wrestling (Florida)
  - SCW Florida Championship (1 time)
  - SCW Southern Heavyweight Championship (1 time)
- USA Pro Wrestling
  - USA Pro Heavyweight Championship (1 time)
- USA Xtreme Wrestling
  - UXW United States Championship (2 times)
- VooDoo Wrestling
  - VooDoo Wrestling Championship (1 time)
- Global Wrestling Alliance
  - GWA Television Championship (1 time)

== Seminars & additional training ==
- Les Thatcher
- Terry Taylor
- Tom Prichard
- Ricky Steamboat
- Harley Race
