= Rob Terry =

Welsh professional wrestler (born 1980)

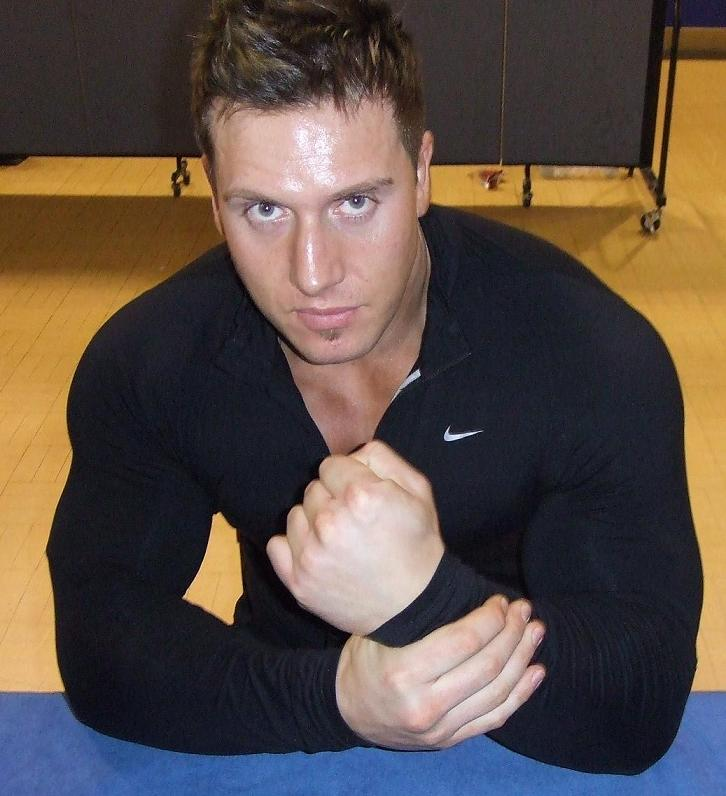
- Terry in 2010

Personal information
- Born: Robert Terry; 30 April 1980 (age 46) Swansea, Wales, United Kingdom
- Education: Neath Port Talbot College
- Spouse: Sarah Treviso (m. 2008)

Professional wrestling career
- Ring name(s): Big Rob; The Freak; Rob Terry; Robbie T
- Billed height: 6 ft 5 in (1.96 m)
- Billed weight: 299 lb (136 kg)
- Billed from: Swansea, Wales
- Trained by: Florida Championship Wrestling; D-Von Dudley; Bubba Ray Dudley
- Debut: 10 November 2007
- Retired: 15 June 2019

Robert Terry (born 30 April 1980) is a Welsh bodybuilder and a former professional wrestler. He is known for his work in Total Nonstop Action Wrestling (TNA) under the ring names Rob Terry, Robbie T and The Freak.

He is also known for his work in TNA's developmental territory Ohio Valley Wrestling (OVW), where he is a former two-time Heavyweight Champion and a one-time Southern Tag Team and Television Champion. He has also competed for the Wrestle-1 promotion as well as WWE's developmental territory, Florida Championship Wrestling.

== Early life ==
Terry was born in Swansea, Wales, United Kingdom. He is a former bouncer and studied sports science at Neath Port Talbot College, South Wales.

== Professional wrestling career ==
=== World Wrestling Entertainment (2007–2008) ===
Terry signed a developmental contract with World Wrestling Entertainment in 2007 and was assigned to Florida Championship Wrestling. On 10 November, Terry, under the ring name Big Rob, debuted as Nick Nemeth's bodyguard and accompanied Nemeth to the ring for his matches. On 1 December, Big Rob made his in-ring debut as he and Nemeth defeated Robert Anthony and Bryan Kelly in a tag team match. In December 2007 and January 2008, Terry appeared at several WWE television program tapings, accompanying Nemeth to the ring for dark matches. On 12 January, Big Rob teamed with Nick Nemeth in a losing effort to Mighty Mikey and Matt O'Neal. Three days later, Rob and Nemeth lost to Mikey and O'Neal in a rematch. In August 2008, Terry was released from his WWE developmental contract. According to Chris Jericho's autobiography, he wanted Terry to be his protege when he started his heel run in 2008. However, Terry was released and the role was given to Lance Cade.

=== Total Nonstop Action Wrestling (2009–2015) ===
==== British Invasion (2009–2010) ====
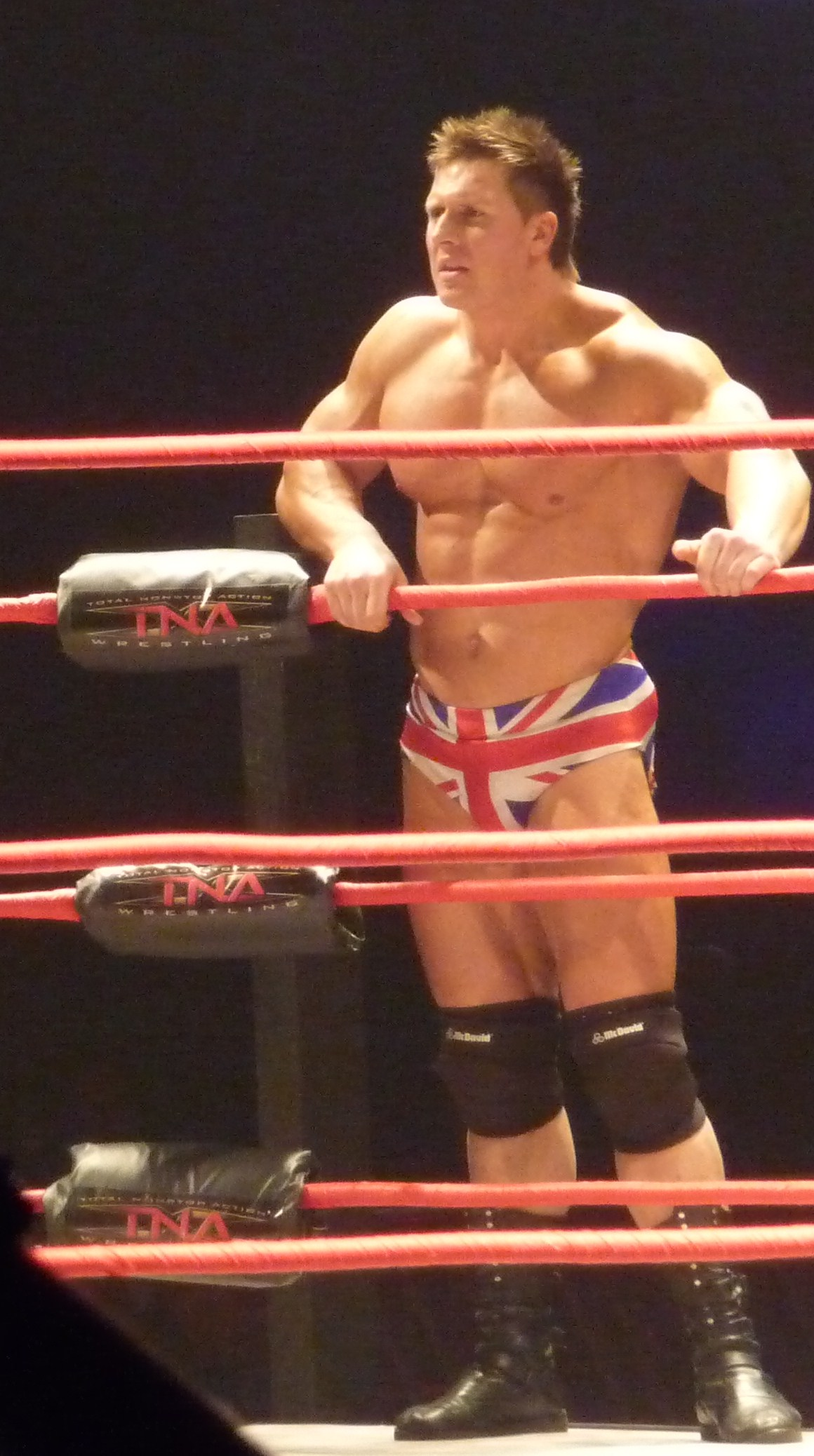
Terry on the apron at a TNA show in 2010

On the edition of 30 April 2009 of TNA Impact!, Terry made his Total Nonstop Action Wrestling debut as a member of the newly formed stable known as The British Invasion alongside Doug Williams and Brutus Magnus. Their first act was to attack Hernandez, thus writing him out of storylines until he recovered from a legitimate injury. They claimed Hernandez' "Feast or Fired" briefcase, awarding it to Terry. This implied that Terry could demand a match for the TNA World Heavyweight Championship at any time within the remainder of the calendar year, but no formal announcement was made. Since then, Terry had played a minor role, usually performing run-ins on behalf of his teammates. They attacked Team 3D (Brother Devon and Brother Ray), instigating a feud that led to several matches, mainly without Terry. In July, Terry, Magnus and Williams joined Eric Young, Sheik Abdul Bashir, Kiyoshi and Homicide to form World Elite. World Elite then formed an alliance with The Main Event Mafia, which led to Terry teaming with such wrestlers as Booker T and Scott Steiner. Together, they feuded with Beer Money, Inc. (James Storm and Robert Roode) and Team 3D.

Terry faced Hernandez at Hard Justice for the "Feast or Fired" briefcase, but lost in nine seconds. This initiated a story in which Terry fell out of favour with his allies. Terry would make a series of mistakes, or would fall victim to a teammate's mistake, and cost the Main Event Mafia or World Elite a match. Initially, World Elite defended their team member and broke their alliance with Main Event Mafia, which dissolved soon thereafter. But the remainder of World Elite would berate Terry for costing them further victories. Eric Young mistakenly hit Terry with a title belt on 5 November 2009 episode of TNA Impact!. One week later, Terry tried to interfere in a match but accidentally caused World Elite to lose. The members of the team were upset with him for causing the loss.

On 18 October 2009, at Bound for Glory Magnus and Williams took part in a four way Full Metal Mayhem match for the TNA World Tag Team Championship and the IWGP Tag Team Championship. While the British Invasion lost the IWGP titles to Team 3D, they won the TNA titles from the Main Event Mafia (represented by Scott Steiner and Booker T), when Terry interfered in the match. As a result of this match, a feud between Beer Money, Inc. and the British Invasion was re-ignited. The entire World Elite stable conspired to prevent Beer Money, Inc. from winning the titles, usually by getting themselves disqualified. Terry objected to the plot, believing that British Invasion could legitimately beat Beer Money, Inc. in a clean match. His confidence irked his teammates further.

For one episode of Impact, Mick Foley offered Kevin Nash full control. Nash subsequently booked the entire show to benefit himself and the World Elite members. Terry, Williams and Magnus faced Chris Sabin in a handicap match, but still lost very quickly, when Sabin pinned Terry. While Magnus and Williams berated Terry, Terry gestured that he was going to fight back, but he quickly dropped his resistance.

At Final Resolution Terry and the rest of World Elite, with the exception of Magnus and Williams, took part in the "Feast or Fired" match. Young claimed that their aim was to prevent Beer Money from earning another match for British Invasion's TNA World Tag Team Championship. During the match, Bashir and Nash acquired a briefcase each. Terry assumed that if World Elite claimed all four briefcases, then it would be impossible for James Storm and Robert Roode to win a title match. But when Terry grabbed a briefcase, Young, Kiyoshi and Homicide reacted as if Terry had betrayed the team. After the match, it was revealed that Terry had the briefcase containing a shot at the X Division Championship.

==== Global Champion and Immortal (2010–2011) ====
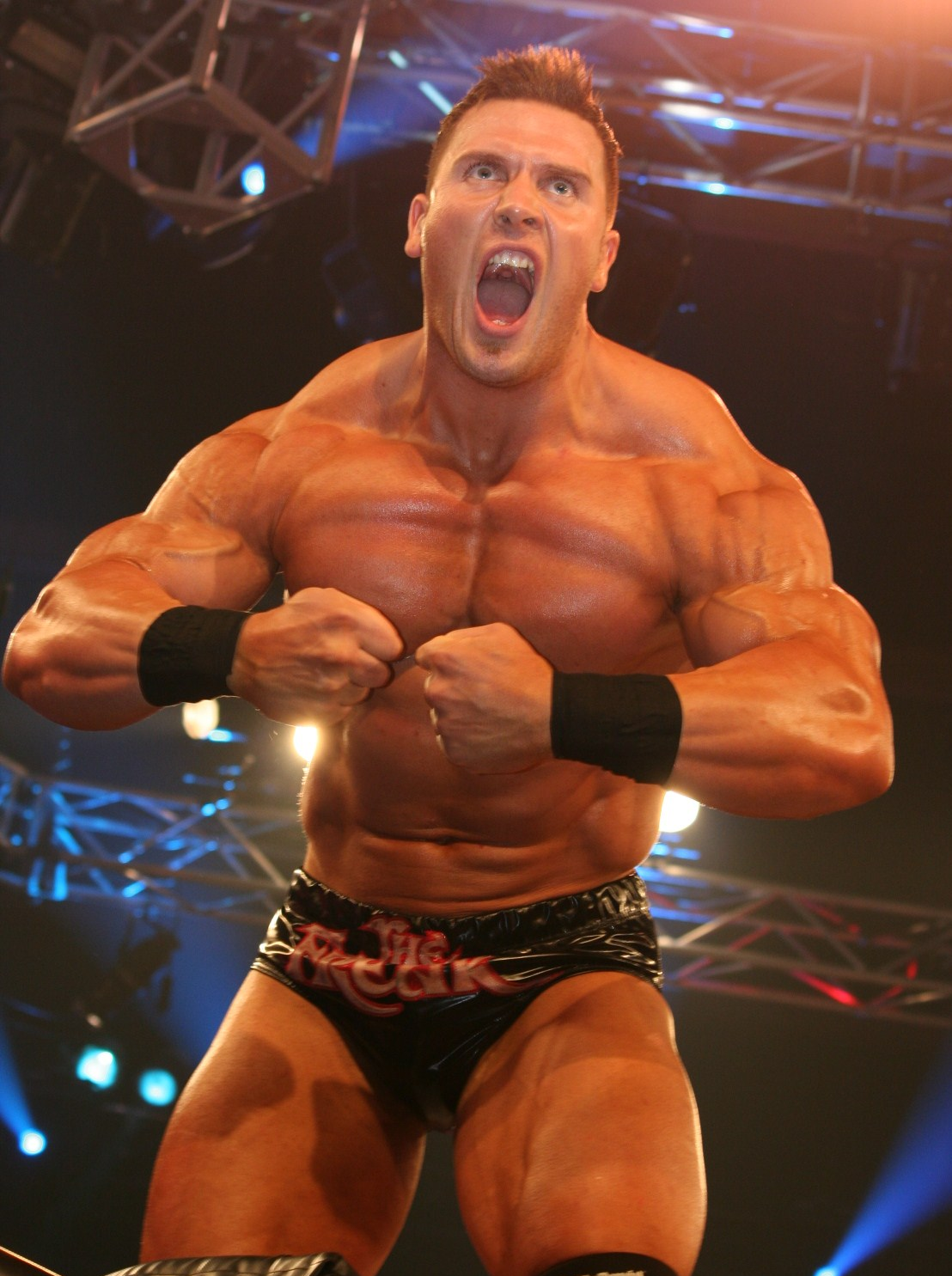
Terry posing in the ring in July 2010

On 27 January 2010, Terry defeated Eric Young at a house show in Cardiff, Wales, to win the TNA Global Championship. Terry's win also made him the first Welshman to hold a championship in a major wrestling organisation. On the following night's edition of Impact! the British Invasion attacked Amazing Red, but as Terry went to cash in his "Feast or Fired" contract he was ordered by Magnus to hand it over to Williams, who then instead faced Red and quickly defeated him for the X Division Championship. On the edition of 18 February of Impact! Terry finally grew tired of Magnus' abuse and attacked him, thus ending his alliance with the British Invasion and turning face. On the edition of 25 February of Impact! Terry made his first Global Championship title defence, when he defeated Mr. Anderson, after interference from Kurt Angle. Since then, Terry went on to defend the Global Championship in quick squash matches against his former British Invasion team-mate Doug Williams, as well as Magnus at Destination X. The very next day on Impact!, Terry again successfully defended the championship, squashing Tomko in a mere 65 seconds. On the edition of 5 April of Impact! Terry adopted the nickname "The Freak". On the edition of 19 April of Impact! Terry joined Team Hogan and teamed with Abyss, Jeff Jarrett and Samoa Joe to defeat Team Flair (Sting, Desmond Wolfe, Robert Roode and James Storm) in an eight-man tag team match. During this time, Terry was being built as an unstoppable monster and was asked and agreed to take an unprotected chair shot to the head during a match with Homicide. Several wrestling news outlets reported on the incident, which caused Terry to legitimately bleed heavily from the top of his head. Dave Meltzer of The Wrestling Observer Online called it "completely disgusting and unnecessary." Later, he started a feud with newcomer Orlando Jordan. After weeks of stalking Terry, Jordan debuted his new interview segment, "The O-Zone" on the edition of 3 May of Impact!, attacking Terry during the segment and beginning a feud. On the next edition of Impact! Jordan attacked Terry with a lead pipe as Terry was preparing to defend his title against Abyss. At Sacrifice Terry defeated Jordan to retain the Global Championship. On 20 June, Terry became the longest reigning Global Champion in history, beating Booker T's reign of 143 days as champion. On 13 July at the tapings of the edition of 22 July of Impact!, Terry lost the Global Championship to A.J. Styles, ending his reign at 167 days. Terry received a rematch for the title, now renamed the TNA Television Championship, on the edition of 5 August of Impact!, but was defeated by Styles after a low blow.

On the edition of 16 December of Impact!, Terry turned heel, costing Mr. Anderson and Matt Morgan their match against Jeff Hardy and Kazarian. The following week, he was recruited by Ric Flair to serve as the bodyguard of Fortune. On 13 February 2011 at Against All Odds, Terry wrestled his first pay-per-view match in seven months when he teamed with his Immortal stablemates Gunner and Murphy and faced James Storm, Robert Roode and Scott Steiner in a losing effort. Terry then began feuding with Steiner, attacking him on the edition of 24 February of Impact! during a posedown between the two. The following week, Steiner defeated Terry in a singles match to end the feud. Two weeks later, Terry was given an opportunity to regain the vacated TNA Television Championship in an all–Immortal three-way match, which also included Murphy and Gunner, who would ultimately go on to win the title. On the edition of 21 April of Impact!, Terry and Murphy unsuccessfully challenged Beer Money, Inc. for the TNA World Tag Team Championship in a steel cage match. On the edition of 5 May of Impact!, Terry was kicked out of Immortal, despite defeating Murphy in a "Loser Leaves Immortal" match.

==== Teaming and feuding with Robbie E (2011–2013) ====
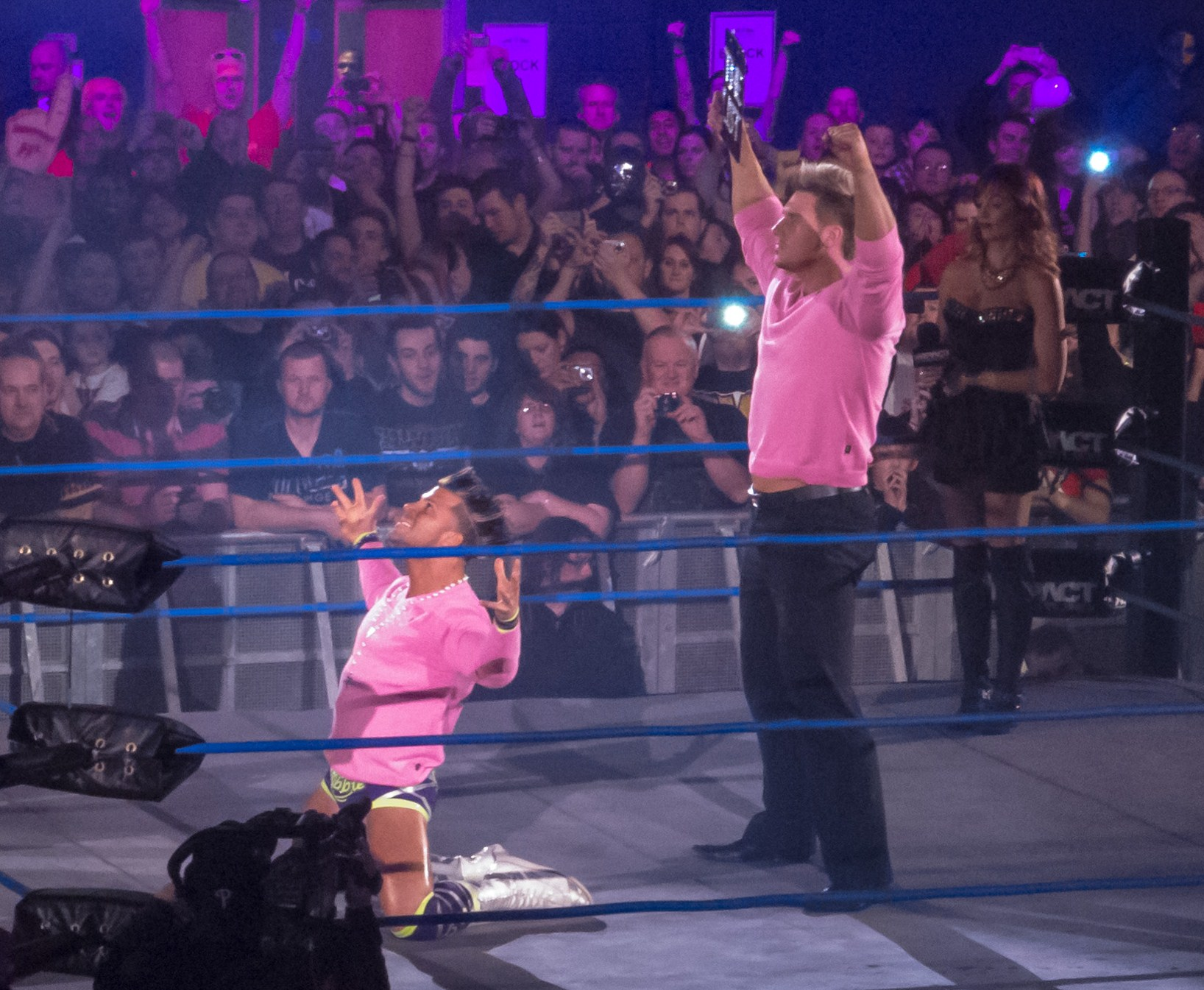
In 2011, Terry changed his name to Robbie T and started an alliance with Robbie E

On the edition of 30 June of Impact Wrestling, Terry returned, as a face, for the first time since being exiled from Immortal to save his former British Invasion partners, Magnus and Douglas Williams, from a beatdown by Mexican America (Hernandez, Anarquia, Rosita, and Sarita). Terry made appearances beside Magnus and Williams for the next two weeks, after which his reunion with the two was abruptly forgotten. On the edition of 25 August of Impact Wrestling, Robbie E proposed Terry an alliance between two with Terry promising to think it over. At the tapings of the edition of 8 September of Impact Wrestling, Terry attacked Eric Young after his match with Robbie E, signifying a new alliance between the two and another heel turn for Terry. Terry's and Robbie's feud with Young eventually led to a tag team match on the edition of 10 November of Impact Wrestling, where Young teamed with Jersey Shore cast member Ronnie to defeat Terry and Robbie. On 16 December 2011, at AAA's Guerra de Titanes, as part of the TNA invasion storyline, Terry faced El Mesías in a match to earn a shot at the AAA World Heavyweight Championship, but was unsuccessful. In May 2012, Terry returned where he, along with Robbie E, began feuding with Devon over the TNA Television Championship, with each of them unsuccessfully him for the title in singles matches on Impact Wrestling and finally in a three-way match on 13 May at Sacrifice. The Robbies would continue their feud with Devon by attacking him during his title matches. On 10 June at Slammiversary, the Robbies were defeated by Devon and Garett Bischoff in a tag team match. While continuing to work for OVW, Terry also remained a regular on TNA's programming and on 25 October episode of Impact Wrestling, unsuccessfully challenged Samoa Joe for the TNA Television Championship. Going into 2013, tension began to be teased between the Robbies, with Terry constantly upstaging and defying Robbie E. On 28 February episode of Impact Wrestling, the alliance between the Robbies ended with Robbie E, who was pretending to reconcile with Terry, hitting him over the head with his VIP sign before being chased off by Terry. The rivalry culminated in a singles match on 10 March at Lockdown, where Terry emerged victorious. On the following episode of Impact Wrestling from Chicago, Illinois, Terry defeated Robbie E in a rematch to end the feud. On the edition of 2 May of Impact Wrestling Terry defeated Robbie E, Jesse and Joey Ryan in a 3 on 1 Handicap match. On 12 January 2013, Terry took part in Joker's Wild (which aired 3 May 2013), teaming with Matt Morgan in a first round victory over Joey Ryan and Al Snow. Later in the night during the main event $100,000-dollar battle royal, Terry entered 11 of 12 but was eliminated by Matt Morgan 8th of 11. On the edition of 13 June of Impact Wrestling, Terry competed in a four-way qualifying match for the Bound for Glory Series, against Matt Morgan, Kenny King and Magnus who ended up getting the victory.

==== Ohio Valley Wrestling (2012–2013) ====
On 6 December 2011, it was reported that Terry had been sent to TNA's new developmental territory, Ohio Valley Wrestling. On 18 January 2012, Terry made his debut in OVW as a member of the heel stable The Mascagni Family by attacking Jason Wayne during his OVW Heavyweight Championship match with Rudy Switchblade, thereby disqualifying Switchblade and letting him retain his title. After the match ended, an irate and spent Jason Wayne reentered the ring and called out Terry for interfering in his match. Terry returned to the ring and defeated Wayne in a bonus match after a quick beatdown. On 22 February, Terry and Jessie Godderz defeated Jason Wayne and Shiloh Jonze for the OVW Southern Tag Team Championship. The team's reign ended on 7 April, when Godderz and Rudy Switchblade, who was also recognised as part of the champions under "The Family Rule", were defeated by Anarquia and Raul LaMotta. After supposedly defeating stablemate Mohamad Ali Vaez on 21 April in Rio de Janeiro, Brazil for the OVW Television Championship, and losing the title back to him four days later, Terry defeated Johnny Spade on 12 May at OVW's Saturday Night Special event to win the OVW Heavyweight Championship. Terry was stripped of the title on 27 June. On 1 December, Terry defeated Crimson to regain the OVW Heavyweight Championship. On 30 January 2013, Terry lost the title to Doug Williams. On 19 June 2013, Terry defeated Jay Bradley in a number one contenders match for the OVW Heavyweight Championship. On 6 July 2013, at the Saturday Night Special Terry was defeated by Jamin Olivencia in a match for the OVW Heavyweight Championship. Terry joined forces with Marcus Anthony winning the 2013 Nightmare Cup Tag Team Tournament and earning a shot for OVW Southern Tag Team Championships.

==== The Menagerie (2014–2015) ====
In April 2014, Terry made his return to TNA as part of Knux's new Menagerie stable, working under a mask and the ring name The Freak. On 3 July, episode of Impact Wrestling, The Menagerie (Knux and The Freak) unsuccessfully challenged The Wolves (Davey Richards and Eddie Edwards) in a three-way tag team match for the TNA World Tag Team Championships The BroMans (Jessie Godderz and DJ Z) were also included in the match. On 1 January 2015, Terry's profile was moved to TNA Alumni section and The Freak was removed from The Menagerie profile, confirming his departure from the company.

=== Wrestle-1 (2013–2014) ===
As part of a working relationship between TNA and Wrestle-1 it was announced on 6 November 2013, that Terry would be working a tour for the Japanese promotion between 16 November and 1 December. In their debut match for the promotion, Terry and fellow TNA worker Jay Bradley defeated Kaz Hayashi and Shuji Kondo in a tag team match. Terry remained undefeated for the entire tour, teaming with Bradley to win tag team matches against the likes of Koji Kanemoto and Seiki Yoshioka, and Kanemoto and Minoru Tanaka, and finally defeating Bradley in three straight singles matches between 29 November and 1 December. Terry remained with Wrestle-1 over the new year and in January 2014, began working alongside the Wrestle-1 Seikigun against the heel stable Desperado. On 2 March, Terry took part in the big Kaisen: Outbreak event, which featured several wrestlers from TNA, teaming with Keiji Mutoh and Taiyō Kea to defeat Samoa Joe and Desperado members Masayuki Kono and René Duprée in a six-man tag team match. Post-match, Mutoh praised Terry, comparing him to a young Hulk Hogan.

=== Independent circuit (2014–2019) ===
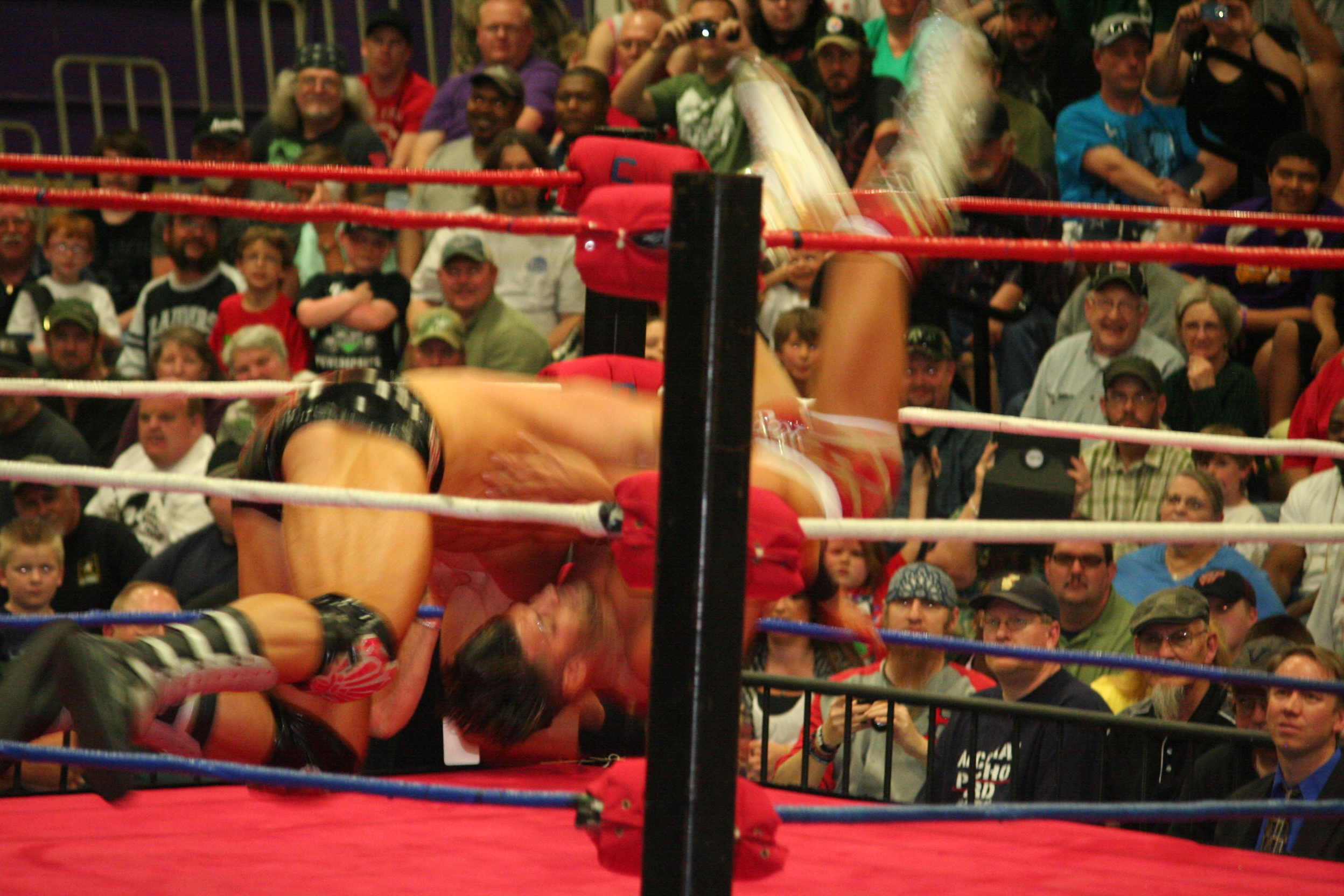
Terry performing a running powerslam

On 9 August 2014, Terry made his debut for Britannia Wrestling Promotions defeating Babyfaced Pitbull to win the PWI:BWP World Catchweight Championship in Prestatyn, Wales, UK. He lost the title later that same day to Marc Morgan. On 12 December 2014 at Rock N Wrestle Promotion, Terry was defeated by TJ Rage in Inverness, Highland, Scotland, UK.

On 5 January 2015, at an event for German Wrestling Promotions, Terry was defeated by Absolute Andy for the GWP World Championship. On 25 September 2016, Terry made his debut for Diamond Stars Wrestling in Tokyo, Japan where he and Masakatsu Funaki unsuccessfully challenged The Iron Empire (Rob Conway and Matt Riviera) for the NWA World Tag Team Championships in a two out of three falls match. On 23 February 2017, Terry and Kazushi Miyamoto defeated The Iron Empire in Tokyo to become the new NWA World Tag Team Champions. on 17 June 2017 they would lose the titles to The Heatseekers. Since 2019, Rob Terry quietly retired from wrestling.

== Other media ==
On 10 November 2012, Terry, along with several other TNA workers, was featured in an episode of MTV's Made.

Terry has also featured in Generation Iron: Natty 4 Life documentary series, being highlighted as a natural bodybuilder.

== Championships and accomplishments ==
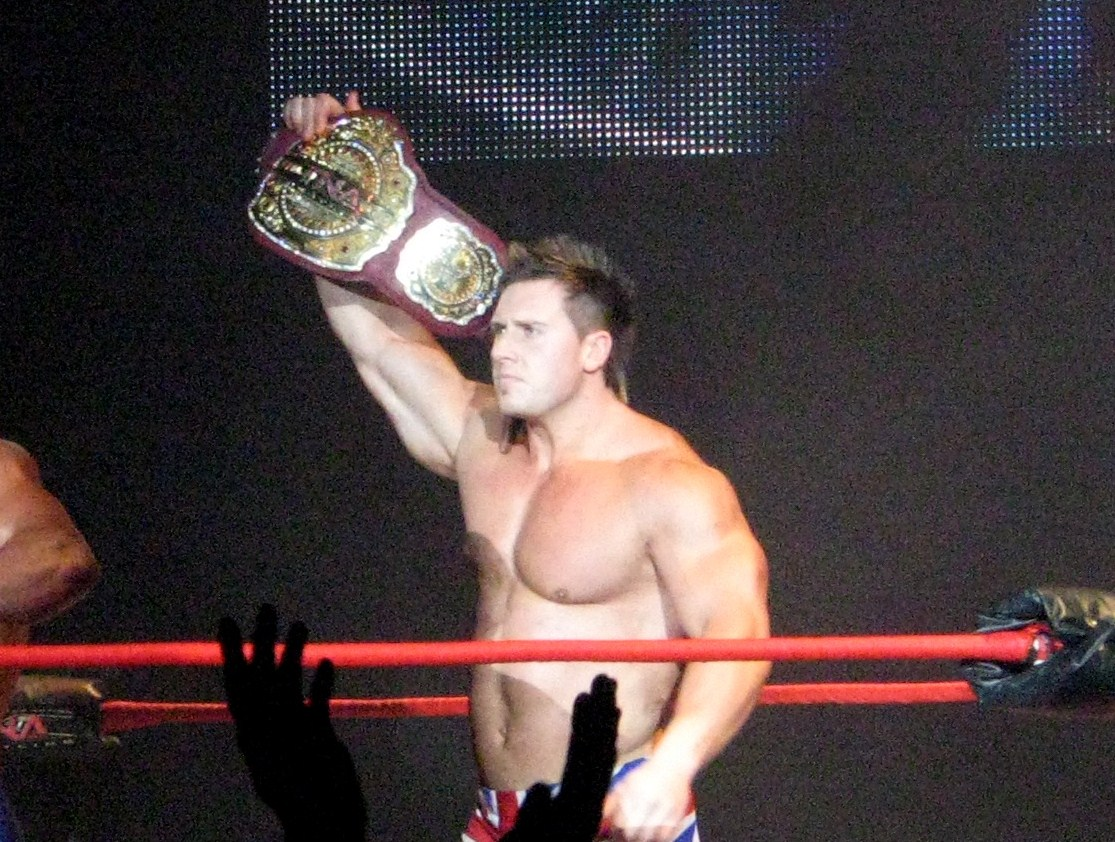
Terry as TNA Global Champion

- Britannia Wrestling Promotions
  - PWI:BWP World Catchweight Championship (1 time)
- Full Throttle Pro Wrestling
  - FTPW Tag Team Championship (1 time) – with Deimos
- Go Wrestle
  - GW Powerweight Championship (2 times)
- National Wrestling Alliance
  - NWA World Tag Team Championship (1 time) – with Kazushi Miyamoto
- Ohio Valley Wrestling
  - OVW Heavyweight Championship (2 times)
  - OVW Television Championship (1 time)
  - OVW Southern Tag Team Championship (1 time)^{1} – with Jessie Godderz and Rudy Switchblade
  - Nightmare Cup Tag Team Tournament (2013) – with Marcus Anthony
  - Eighth OVW Triple Crown Champion
- Pro Wrestling Illustrated
  - PWI ranked him #67 of the top 500 singles wrestlers in the PWI 500 in 2010
- Total Nonstop Action Wrestling
  - TNA Global Championship (1 time)
  - Feast or Fired (2009 – X Division Championship contract)^{2}

^{1}Terry defended the title with either Godderz or Switchblade under The Freebird Rule.
^{2}Terry was forced to give the contract to his teammate Doug Williams.

== Bodybuilding record ==
Year	Body	Competition	Division	Placing
1999	IFBB	British Championships	Junior	6th
2000	IFBB	British Championships	Junior	1st
2001	NABBA	Mr Universe	Junior	3rd
2004		Musclemania	HeavyWeight	3rd
2006		Musclemania Worlds	HeavyWeight	1st
2009		Musclemania Worlds	Professional	8th
