= Jaxson Ryker =

American professional wrestler (born 1982)

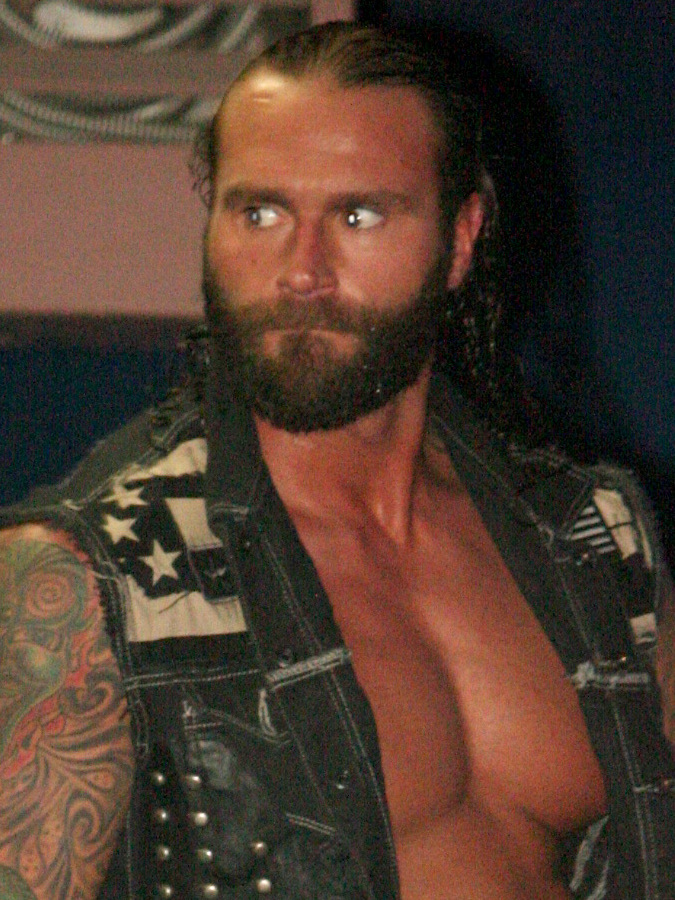
- Ryker in 2015

Personal information
- Born: Chad Lail; June 6, 1982 (age 44) Hickory, North Carolina, U.S.
- Spouses: Jayme Jameson (m. 2012, divorced) Stacy Lail (m. 2015)
- Children: 1

Professional wrestling career
- Ring name(s): Chad Lail; Gunner; Jaxson Ryker; Phil Shatter; Phill Shatter
- Billed height: 6 ft 2 in (188 cm)
- Billed weight: 244 lb (111 kg)
- Billed from: Atlanta, Georgia; Hickory, North Carolina
- Trained by: Abel Adams
- Debut: August 2001
- Retired: August 27, 2023
- Military service
- Allegiance: United States
- Branch: United States Marine Corps
- Service years: 2002–2006
- Rank: Sergeant
- Conflicts: Iraq War

Chad Lail (born June 6, 1982) is an American retired professional wrestler. He is best known for his tenure in Total Nonstop Action Wrestling under the ring name Gunner and in WWE under the ring name Jaxson Ryker.

Lail started his professional wrestling career in 2001, working as Phil Shatter on several independent promotions. He was signed by Total Nonstop Action Wrestling (TNA) in 2010, where he changed his ring name to Gunner and was presented as a member of the villainous group Immortal. During his time in the group, he won the TNA Television Championship once. After leaving the group, he would work as a tag team and singles wrestler, most notably as tag team partner and rival of James Storm, winning the TNA World Tag Team Championship with him.

Lail left TNA in 2015 and two years later in 2017, he signed a contract with WWE. He was assigned to the farm territory NXT, where he changed his ring name to Jaxson Ryker. In 2018, he formed The Forgotten Sons, alongside Wesley Blake and Steve Cutler. From April to June 2020, the stable made appearances on SmackDown. Ryker would continue working with WWE until November 2021, when he was released. Lail retired in August 2023 to become a police officer.

== Early life ==
Chad Lail was born on June 6, 1982, in Hickory, North Carolina. He served in the Iraq War with the United States Marine Corps as a machine gunner, and reached the rank of a sergeant.

== Professional wrestling career ==
=== Independent circuit (2001–2010) ===
Lail signed with NWA Anarchy in 2005, using the ring name of Phil Shatter, and he eventually received a championship match against NWA Anarchy Heavyweight Champion Ace Rocwell, which he won to become the new champion. Shatter later won the NWA National Heavyweight Championship from Crusher Hansen on January 17, 2009, and is the longest reigning champion in the title's history, and he would drop the championship to Chance Prophet on February 19, 2011, after signing a contract with Total Nonstop Action Wrestling (TNA).

In October 2010, Shatter defeated Chase Stevens for the Showtime All-Star Wrestling (SAW) International Heavyweight Championship, but was forced to vacate the title in June 2011 due to being unable to defend it because of his TNA schedule.

Shatter appeared at Ring of Honor's The Big Bang! pay-per-view on April 3, 2010, defeating Zack Salvation in the opening match of the pay-per-view.

=== Total Nonstop Action Wrestling (2010–2015) ===
==== Immortal (2010–2012) ====
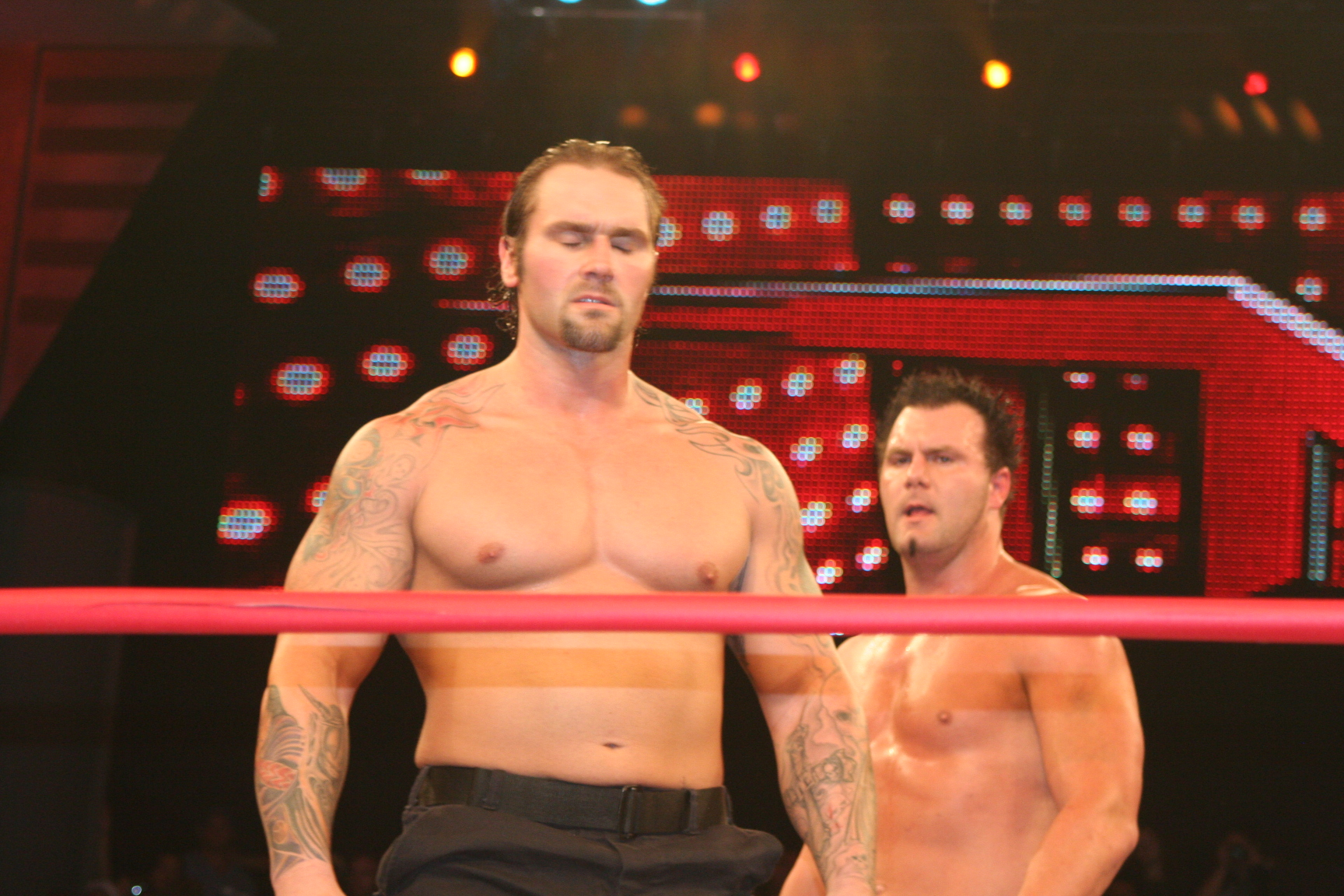
Gunner (front) and Murphy on Impact! in July 2010

At the June 23, 2010, tapings of TNA's Impact! television show, Shatter made his TNA debut, along with Mikael Judas, as TNA's on-air security. On the July 29, 2010 edition of TNA Impact! taping, Shatter, now using the name Gunner and Mikael Judas, using the name Murphy, came out after an altercation involving Jeff Hardy and Mr. Anderson with Matt Morgan, and attacked Hardy and Anderson, thus turning heel. They then teamed with Morgan in a handicap match, where they were defeated by Hardy and Anderson. After appearing with Morgan the following week, Gunner and Murphy's angle with him was discontinued and they went back to being regular security guards.

On the October 21 edition of Impact! Gunner and Murphy aligned themselves with Jeff Jarrett and helped him beat down Samoa Joe. At the Turning Point pay-per-view Gunner and Murphy interfered in a match between Jarrett and Joe, helping Jarrett pick up the win. On the following edition of Impact! Gunner and Murphy made their in–ring return, losing to Samoa Joe in a handicap match. After Jarrett's feud with Samoa Joe ended, Gunner and Murphy became regular members of the Immortal stable and were less involved with Jarrett. At the December 9 tapings of Xplosion Gunner and Murphy picked up their first win in TNA, defeating Ink Inc. (Jesse Neal and Shannon Moore) in a tag team match.

On February 13, 2011, at Against All Odds, Gunner and Murphy wrestled their first TNA PPV match, a six-man tag team match, where they teamed with their Immortal stablemate Rob Terry in a losing effort against James Storm, Robert Roode and Scott Steiner. In February both Gunner and Murphy signed two–year contracts with TNA, which saw them moved from their roles as just security guards into the active roster. On the February 24 edition of Impact!, Gunner and Murphy defeated Eric Young and Orlando Jordan to earn their first shot at the TNA World Tag Team Championship, held by Beer Money, Inc. (James Storm and Robert Roode). They would receive their shot at the title on the following edition of Impact!, but were defeated by Beer Money, Inc.

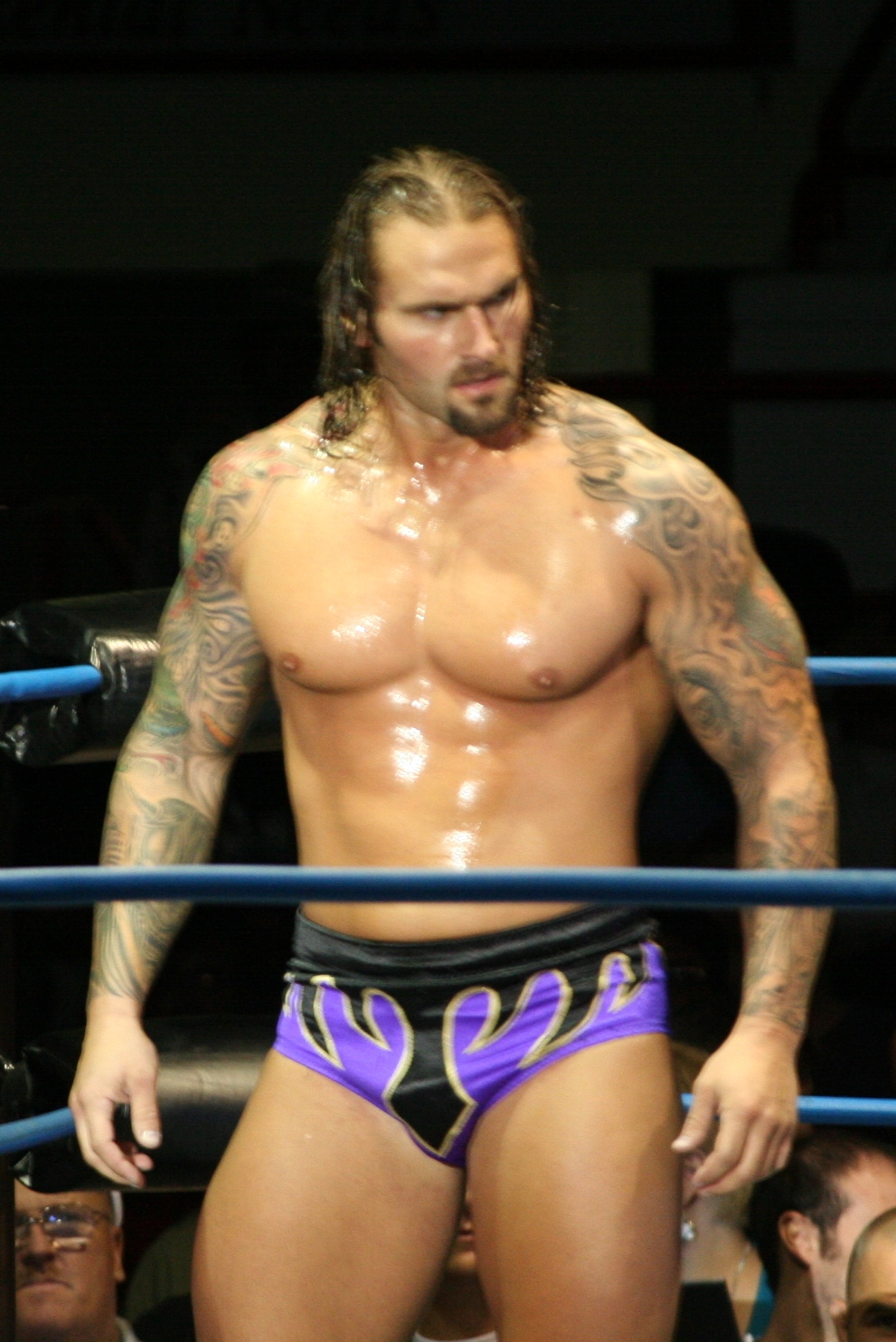
Gunner in July 2011

On March 14 at the tapings of the March 17 edition of Impact!, Gunner defeated Murphy and Rob Terry in a three-way match to win the vacant TNA Television Championship. He would lose the title to Eric Young on May 17 at the tapings of the May 26 edition of Impact Wrestling. On the June 9 edition of Impact Wrestling, Gunner pinned World Heavyweight Champion Sting in a tag team main event, in which he teamed with Mr. Anderson against Sting with Eric Young. The following week, Gunner asked new TNA World Heavyweight Champion Mr. Anderson for a shot at his title and eventually put him through a table, when he declined. In the main event of the show, Gunner defeated Anderson in a non-title match. From June to September, Gunner was one of the twelve participants in the Bound for Glory Series to determine the number one contender to the TNA World Heavyweight Championship. When the group stage of the tournament concluded, Gunner finished in the top four and thus advanced to the finals at No Surrender along with James Storm, Robert Roode and his Immortal stablemate, Bully Ray. On September 11 at No Surrender, Gunner was eliminated from the tournament, when he was defeated by Bobby Roode via submission.

Gunner then began feuding with Immortal's former referee, Garett Bischoff, losing to him via disqualification, following interference from Ric Flair, on the November 10 edition of Impact Wrestling. This was followed by Bischoff picking up two pinfall victories over Gunner on the November 17 and December 8 editions of Impact Wrestling where he would injure Garett by piledriving him into the concrete floor. He would do the same to Jesse Neal and Douglas Williams on the December 15 and 29 editions of Impact Wrestling. On the January 5, 2012, edition of Impact Wrestling, Gunner fought Rob Van Dam to a double countout but failed to injure him after Van Dam retaliated and back body dropped him onto the concrete. Three days later at Genesis, Gunner defeated Van Dam after dropping him onto the concrete floor with a DDT. On February 12 at Against All Odds, Gunner, with Eric Bischoff in his corner, defeated Garett Bischoff, who had Hulk Hogan in his corner, in a singles match. On April 15 at Lockdown, Gunner represented Team Eric Bischoff in the annual Lethal Lockdown match, where the opposing team was led by Garett Bischoff, who ended up winning the match for his team. On the following episode of Impact Wrestling, Gunner unsuccessfully challenged Devon for the TNA Television Championship. After Impact Wrestling, Gunner took hiatus from television. On May 17, Lail announced that he had signed a new three-year contract with TNA.

After a three-month hiatus, Gunner returned to Impact Wrestling on July 26, when he, along with Kid Kash, confronted and eventually attacked the debuting Chavo Guerrero Jr., before he was saved by Hernandez. On August 12 at Hardcore Justice, Gunner and Kash were defeated in a tag team match by Guerrero and Hernandez. Gunner and Kash faced Guerrero and Hernandez, now the TNA World Tag Team Champions, in a rematch on the October 18 episode of Impact Wrestling, but were again defeated. The pay-per-view was aired on May 3.

==== Teaming with James Storm (2013–2014) ====
Gunner returned to Impact Wrestling on May 23, attacking Robbie E and Shark Boy and being chosen as James Storm's partner in his four-way elimination match for the TNA World Tag Team Championship at Slammiversary XI, thus turning face. On June 2 at the pay-per-view, Gunner and Storm won the match over Bad Influence (Christopher Daniels and Kazarian), Austin Aries and Bobby Roode, and defending champions Chavo Guerrero and Hernandez to win the TNA World Tag Team Championship. Gunner and Storm returned on the August 8 episode of Impact Wrestling, teaming up with ODB to defeat the BroMans (Jessie Godderz and Robbie E) and Mickie James in a six-person mixed tag team match. On October 20 at Bound for Glory, Gunner and Storm lost the World Tag Team Championship to BroMans in their first title defense, ending their reign at 140 days. Gunner and Storm received their rematch on the October 31 episode of Impact Wrestling, but were again defeated by the BroMans.

On the December 12 episode of Impact Wrestling, Gunner competed in the Feast or Fired match where he was one of the four participants to retrieve a briefcase, which was revealed to contain a match for the TNA World Heavyweight Championship the following week. Gunner put the briefcase on the line against Storm on the December 26 episode of Impact Wrestling, but the match ended in a double countout, with Gunner retaining the case. Gunner then retained the case again against Storm at Genesis, where the case was suspended from a pole. Gunner and Storm finally reunited at the January 30, 2014 episode of Impact Wrestling, when they were challenged by Bad Influence for Gunner's case, which he would retain. On the February 20 episode of Impact Wrestling, Gunner cashed in his Feast or Fired briefcase for a TNA World Heavyweight Championship match but lost to Magnus, after Storm turned on Gunner and hit him with a Last Call superkick as Gunner went for a diving headbutt. On March 9 at Lockdown, Gunner defeated Storm in a Steel Cage Last Man Standing match. On the March 20 episode of Impact Wrestling, after Storm berated Gunner's father, Gunner attacked Storm, but Storm managed to turn it around, handcuffing him to the middle rope and threatening Gunner's father at ringside. Storm walked away, but returned to smash a beer bottle over his father's head. On April 27, 2014, Gunner defeated Storm at Sacrifice in an "I Quit Match".

==== Championship pursuits (2014–2015) ====
On the May 1, 2014 episode of Impact Wrestling, Gunner took part in a one night tournament to challenge Eric Young for the TNA World Heavyweight Championship. He defeated Mr. Anderson in the first match after an interference by James Storm and in the finals of the tournament he was defeated by Bobby Roode and failed to win a chance for the title. On May 10 at Victory Road, Gunner won a 12-man Gauntlet battle royal match for a future TNA World Heavyweight Championship match.

On the May 22, 2014 episode of Impact Wrestling, Gunner appeared in the hospital where he was with Samuel Shaw. Short steel links displayed video footage where Gunner talked to Shaw about his illness. On the July 3 episode Impact Wrestling Gunner and Shaw came back and talked with Mr. Anderson and Christy Hemme, during which Shaw acted like a face. On the October 15, 2014 episode of Impact Wrestling, TNA started an eight tag team tournament to determine the number one contenders for the TNA World Tag Team Championship, Gunner and Shaw decided to take part in this tournament. In this case in the first match they lost to Samoa Joe and Low Ki. On the October 22 episode on Impact Wrestling, Shaw turned on Gunner when he hit Gunner with a steel chair and kissed Brittany, starting a feud between the two. Two weeks later, on Impact Wrestling, Gunner defeated Shaw in a no-disqualification match. On the January 23, 2015 episode on Impact Wrestling, Gunner competed in the Feast or Fired match but failed to retrieve a case in the match. He was a member of the Angle team at Lockdown, defeating The Beat Down Clan in a Lethal Lockdown match. On the February 20 episode on Impact Wrestling, Gunner competed in a 20-man #1 contender's gauntlet match but failed to win the match. On April 3, 2015, Gunner defeated Jessie Godderz for a match on Xplosion; this turned out to be Gunner's last TNA match.

On June 19, 2015, Gunner officially announced his departure from TNA. Afterwards, he would often work weekend shows on the independent circuit, while also maintaining a job as a cable technician to provide for his family.

=== WWE (2017–2021) ===
On May 29, 2017, it was reported that Lail had signed with WWE and would be working in the company's developmental territory NXT. On June 29, 2017, Lail made his debut at a NXT live event in a losing effort against No Way Jose. In February 2018, he began teaming with Wesley Blake and Steve Cutler as The Forgotten Sons. In July of that year, Lail's ring name was changed to Jaxson Ryker.

The trio made their first televised appearance on the August 29 episode of NXT in a backstage segment with general manager William Regal. On the September 19 episode of NXT, Ryker made his television in-ring debut by defeating Humberto Carrillo. Blake and Cutler represented the group in the 2019 Dusty Rhodes Tag Team Classic. They defeated Danny Burch and Oney Lorcan in the first-round and Moustache Mountain in the second-round before losing to Aleister Black and Ricochet in the finals. Blake and Cutler competed in a fatal four-way ladder match for the vacant NXT Tag Team Championship at NXT TakeOver: XXV. Despite interference from Ryker, the two were unsuccessful in winning. The group entered the 2020 Dusty Rhodes Tag Team Classic, but were eliminated in the first round by Imperium.

On the April 10, 2020 episode of SmackDown, The Forgotten Sons made their main roster debut, defeating Lucha House Party (Gran Metalik and Lince Dorado). On the May 1 episode of SmackDown, they defeated SmackDown Tag Team Champions The New Day (Big E and Kofi Kingston). This led to a fatal four-way tag team match also involving Lucha House Party, and John Morrison and the Miz for the title at Money in the Bank, where The New Day retained.

They began portraying themselves as American patriots, with Ryker and Cutler highlighting their services in the marines. However, the gimmick was dropped due to a controversial tweet by Ryker supporting President Donald Trump at the height of the Black Lives Matter movement which led to backlash from backstage, social media and within the fan base. The Forgotten Sons were then taken off television as a result.

On December 4, Ryker's partnership with Blake and Cutler was quietly discontinued, as they were paired with King Corbin on SmackDown, while Ryker was paired with Elias on Raw. Ryker's alliance with Elias lasted until May 31, 2021, when Elias abandoned him during a tag team match, subsequently turning Ryker face. Ryker defeated Elias in a Strap Match on the June 28 episode of Raw and in a "Symphony of Destruction" match on the July 19 episode of Raw. After ending his feud with Elias, Ryker would become a mainstay on Main Event until he was released from his WWE contract on November 18.

== Other media ==
=== Film ===
Year	Title	Role	Notes
2015	Navy Seals vs. Zombies	Petty Officer 1st Class Carl	
2018	Game Night	Bulgarian Goon	

=== Games ===
Lail, as Jaxson Ryker, made his video game debut as a playable character in WWE 2K20.

== Personal life ==
Lail is a Christian. Lail was married to fellow professional wrestler Jayme Jameson from 2012, but they divorced at an unknown date. He married a woman named Stacy in 2015, and they have a daughter together.

Lail retired from wrestling following his last match at an AML Wrestling on August 27. He announced soon after that he had become a deputy sheriff working for the Iredell County Sheriff's Office in North Carolina. He was sworn in on September 14, 2023.

Lail supported Donald Trump's 2020 presidential campaign. That year, he tweeted his support for Trump during the George Floyd protests and was criticized by fellow wrestlers Mustafa Ali, Batista, Joey Janela, Kevin Owens, Adam Page, Ricochet, and Sami Zayn. Lail has also been critical of Black Lives Matter, calling it a "terrorist group".

== Championships and accomplishments ==
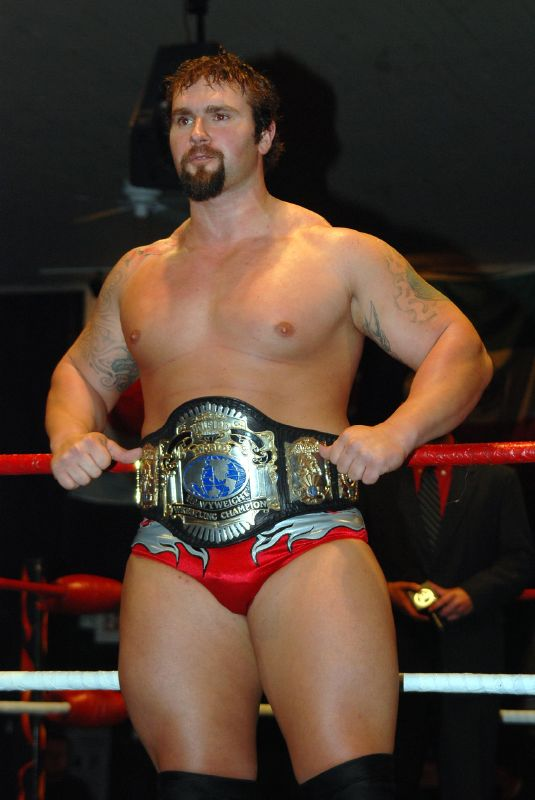
Ryker as the NWA Anarchy Heavyweight Champion in 2007

- Action Packed Wrestling
  - APW Chester Heavyweight Championship (2 times)
- East Coast Championship Wrestling
  - ECCW Light Heavyweight Championship (1 time)
- Ground Xero Wrestling
  - GXW Heavyweight Championship (1 time)
- National Wrestling Alliance
  - NWA National Heavyweight Championship (1 time)
  - Future Legends Cup (2010)
- NWA Anarchy
  - NWA Anarchy Heavyweight Championship (1 time)
  - NWA Anarchy Tag Team Championship (1 time) – with Kimo and Abomination (Note: Shatter defended the title with either Kimo or Abomination under the Freebird Rule.)
- NWA Charlotte
  - NWA Mid-Atlantic Heritage Championship (1 time)
- Pro Wrestling Illustrated
  - Ranked No. 40 of the top 500 singles wrestlers in the PWI 500 in 2014
- Premiere Wrestling Xperience
  - PWX Innovative Television Championship (1 time)
- Showtime All-Star Wrestling
  - SAW International Heavyweight Championship (1 time)
- Southern Wrestling Association
  - Rhymer Cup (2016) – with John Skyler
- Total Nonstop Action Wrestling
  - TNA Television Championship (1 time)
  - TNA World Tag Team Championship (1 time) – with James Storm
  - Feast or Fired (2013 – World Heavyweight Championship contract), (2013 – World Tag Team Championship contract) (Note: Won this contract from Ethan Carter III in a tag team ladder match for both briefcases with James Storm teaming with Gunner, and Magnus teaming with Carter. Later gave the contract to Storm.)
  - TNA World Cup (2014) – with Bully Ray, Eddie Edwards, Eric Young, and ODB
  - TNA World Cup (2015) – with Crazzy Steve, Davey Richards, Jeff Hardy, Rockstar Spud, and Gail Kim
  - TNA Classic (2015)
- WrestleForce
  - WrestleForce Championship (1 time)
- Triple Threat Wrestling
  - 3TW Heavyweight Championship (1 time)
