= Johnny Garrett (politician) =

American politician (born 1978)

Member-elect of the U.S. House of Representatives from Tennessee's 6th district
- Assuming office January 3, 2027
- Succeeding: John Rose

Member of the Tennessee House of Representatives from the 45th district
- In office January 8, 2019 – November 3, 2026
- Preceded by: Courtney Rogers
- Succeeded by: Brian Stewart

Personal details
- Born: August 8, 1978 (age 48) Goodlettsville, Tennessee, U.S.
- Party: Republican
- Children: 3
- Education: University of Tennessee (BS); Nashville School of Law (JD)
- Website: State House website Campaign website

Johnny Claude Garrett (born August 8, 1978) is an American attorney and politician from Tennessee. A member of the Republican Party, he was elected to the United States House of Representatives for Tennessee's 6th congressional district in 2026. Garrett previously represented the 45th district of the Tennessee House of Representatives, based in the northern suburbs of Nashville, from 2019 to 2026.

== Early life and education ==
Johnny C. Garrett was born on August 8, 1978, to John Claude Garrett and his wife Susan Garrett. His father served as president of the Bank of Goodlettsville as well as co-owner of Cole and Garrett Funeral Home and Cremation Services. Garrett earned a Bachelor of Science degree from the University of Tennessee and a Juris Doctor from Nashville School of Law.

== Career ==
Garrett began practicing law in Sumner County in 2006, representing businesses and entrepreneurs.

In 2018, Courtney Rogers, incumbent for the 45th district of the Tennessee House of Representatives, announced her retirement. Garrett overwhelmingly won the Republican primary to replace her, and defeated Democrat Hana Ali in the general election with nearly 70% of the vote. He was sworn into office in January 2019.

Garrett was elected as majority whip by his House colleagues for the 2020 legislative session.

In 2023, Garrett co-sponsored a resolution to expel Democratic lawmakers from the legislature for violating decorum rules. The expulsion was widely characterized as unprecedented. Following the public outrage of the expulsion, robocalls went out to Tennesseans with false claims that Antifa members from all over the country came to the Capitol, that Tennessee Highway Patrol confiscated brass knuckles and pipe bombs, and urged Tennesseans to thank Johnny Garrett for "standing up to the radical liberals and their two-tiered justice system."

In leaked audio of a Tennessee House GOP meeting, Garrett claimed that "no legislation in the history of the world has ever been passed under protest."

Garrett is running as the Republican candidate for Tennessee's 6th congressional district in 2026.

== Personal life ==
Garrett was born and raised in Goodlettsville, where he continues to live with his wife and three children.

U.S. House of Representatives
Preceded by John Rose	Member of the U.S. House of Representatives from Tennessee's 6th congressional district Taking office 2027	Elect
