= List of TNA Television Champions =

Listing of professional wrestling champions for the TNA Television Championship

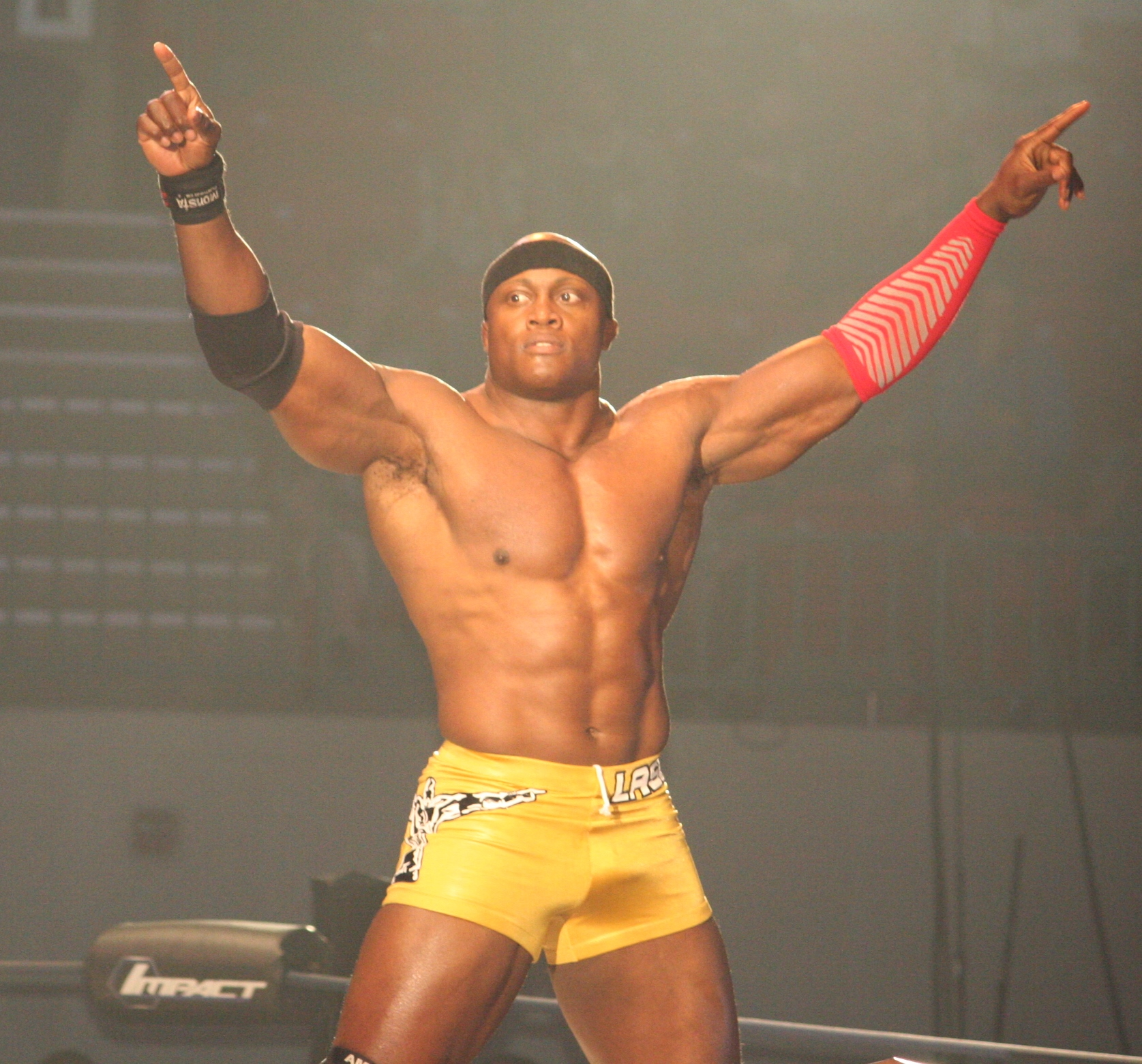
Final champion Lashley

The TNA Television Championship was a professional wrestling championship owned by the professional wrestling promotion Total Nonstop Action Wrestling (TNA, now Impact Wrestling). Being a professional wrestling championship, it is won via a scripted ending to a match or awarded to a wrestler because of a storyline. All title changes occurred at TNA-promoted events. Title changes that occurred on TNA's television program Impact Wrestling (also known as TNA Impact! until May 3, 2011) usually aired on tape delay and as such are listed with the day the tapings occurred, rather than the air date.

The title was introduced by Booker T as the "TNA Legends Championship" on the October 23, 2008 episode of Impact!. Since its introduction, the title has gone under several different names. It continued as the Legends Championship until Eric Young renamed it the "TNA Global Championship" during his first reign on the October 29, 2009 episode of Impact!. During A.J. Styles' second reign, it was named the "TNA Television Championship" on the July 29, 2010 episode of Impact!. It remained under this name until July 3, 2014, when TNA Executive Director Kurt Angle deactivated the title. It was reactivated a year later when TNA renamed it the TNA King of the Mountain Championship and held a King of the Mountain match at their Slammiversary pay-per-view (PPV) event on June 28 between Jeff Jarrett, Matt Hardy, Young, Drew Galloway, and Bobby Roode. Jarrett won the match and the championship, and as a result of Jarrett being GFW founder, the title was also featured in GFW along with TNA.

The inaugural champion was Booker T. Eric Young holds the record for most reigns, with three, and is the only wrestler to hold the title under all four of its incarnations. The longest reign in the title history is Abyss' second reign at 396 days. P. J. Black and Lashley's only reigns hold the record for shortest reign in the title's history at one day. Abyss holds the record for combined days as champion, with 460. Overall, there have been 25 reigns shared among 19 wrestlers, with three vacancies and two deactivations.

== Reigns ==
Names
Names	Dates	Ref(s).
TNA Legends Championship	October 23, 2008 – October 29, 2009	
TNA Global Championship	October 29, 2009 – July 22, 2010	
TNA Television Championship	July 29, 2010 – July 3, 2014	
TNA King of the Mountain Championship	June 28, 2015 – August 12, 2016	

=== Reigns ===
Key
No.	Overall reign number
Reign	Reign number for the specific champion
Days	Number of days held

No.	Champion	Championship change			Reign statistics		Notes	Ref.
No.	Champion	Date	Event	Location	Reign	Days	Notes	Ref.
Total Nonstop Action Wrestling (TNA)
1	Booker T	October 23, 2008	TNA Impact	Las Vegas, NV	1	143	Booker T declared himself the first champion after he unveiled the title belt. The title was then known as the TNA Legends Championship and was unsanctioned by TNA in the storyline.	
2	A.J. Styles	March 15, 2009	Destination X	Orlando, FL	1	126	On the March 19, 2009 episode of Impact!, A.J. Styles was credited as becoming the first-ever TNA Grand Slam Champion thanks to winning the TNA Legends Championship. The title became officially sanctioned by the promotion after this title change.	
3	Kevin Nash	July 19, 2009	Victory Road	Orlando, FL	1	3		
4	Mick Foley	July 22, 2009	TNA Impact	Orlando, FL	1	25	Foley teamed with Bobby Lashley against TNA Legends Champion Kevin Nash and TNA World Heavyweight Champion Kurt Angle in a Tag Team match, in which if a champion was pinned he lost his title. Foley pinned Nash to become the new champion. This episode aired on tape delay on July 30, 2009.	
5	Kevin Nash	August 16, 2009	Hard Justice	Orlando, FL	2	63		
6	Eric Young	October 18, 2009	Bound for Glory	Irvine, California	1	101	Young renamed the title the "TNA Global Championship" on the October 29, 2009 episode of TNA Impact!.	
7	Rob Terry	January 27, 2010	Live event	Cardiff, Wales	1	167		
8	A.J. Styles	July 13, 2010	TNA Impact	Orlando, FL	2	145	This episode aired on tape delay on July 22, 2010. A.J. Styles renamed the title the "TNA Television Championship" on the July 29, 2010 episode of TNA Impact!.	
9	Douglas Williams	December 5, 2010	Final Resolution	Orlando, FL	1	35		
10	Abyss	January 9, 2011	Genesis	Orlando, FL	1	64		
—	Vacated	March 14, 2011	TNA Impact	Orlando, FL	—	—	The title was vacated due to Abyss being unable to defend it after suffering a storyline injury. This episode aired on tape delay on March 17, 2011.	
11	Gunner	March 14, 2011	TNA Impact	Orlando, FL	1	64	Gunner defeated Murphy and Rob Terry in a Three-way match to win the vacant title. This episode aired on tape delay on March 17, 2011. Impact was re-branded Impact Wrestling on May 3, 2011 at the scheduled episode tapings.	
Impact Wrestling (TNA)
12	Eric Young	May 17, 2011	Impact Wrestling	Orlando, FL	2	180	This episode aired on tape delay on May 26, 2011.	
13	Robbie E	November 13, 2011	Turning Point	Orlando, FL	1	126		
14	Devon	March 18, 2012	Victory Road	Orlando, FL	1	192		
—	Vacated	September 26, 2012	—	—	—	—	The title was vacated due to contract negotiations between TNA and Devon breaking off.	
15	Samoa Joe	September 27, 2012	Impact Wrestling	Orlando, FL	1	70	Joe defeated Mr. Anderson to win the vacant championship.	
16	Devon	December 6, 2012	Impact Wrestling	Orlando, FL	2	178		
17	Abyss	June 2, 2013	Slammiversary XI	Boston, MA	2	396		
—	Deactivated	July 3, 2014	—	—	—	—	TNA Executive Director Kurt Angle declared the title inactive. The championship had not been defended, seen, or even mentioned throughout the entirety of Abyss's reign.	
18	Jeff Jarrett	June 28, 2015	Slammiversary	Orlando, FL	1	29	The title was reactivated by TNA on June 25, 2015 and renamed the "TNA King of the Mountain Championship." Jarrett defeated Bobby Roode, Drew Galloway, Eric Young and Matt Hardy in a King of the Mountain match to win the reactivated championship.	
—	Vacated	July 27, 2015	Impact Wrestling	Orlando, FL	—	—	The title was vacated after Jeff Jarrett became TNA General Manager. This episode aired on tape delay on August 12, 2015.	
19	PJ Black	July 27, 2015	Impact Wrestling	Orlando, FL	1	1	Black defeated Lashley, Chris Mordetzky, Eric Young and Robbie E in a King of the Mountain match to win the vacant title. This episode aired on tape delay on August 12, 2015.	
20	Bobby Roode	July 28, 2015	Impact Wrestling	Orlando, FL	1	162	This episode aired on tape delay on September 2, 2015.	
21	Eric Young	January 6, 2016	Impact Wrestling	Bethlehem, PA	3	73	This episode aired on tape delay on January 12, 2016. With this victory, Young becomes the only wrestler to win this championship under all four of its incarnations.	
22	Bram	March 19, 2016	Impact Wrestling: Sacrifice	Orlando, FL	1	35	This was contested in Falls Count Anywhere match. This episode aired on tape delay on April 26, 2016.	
23	Eli Drake	April 23, 2016	Impact Wrestling	Orlando, FL	1	82	Drake invoked his Feast or Fired contract after Bram had been attacked by Lashley. This episode aired on tape delay on May 31, 2016.	
24	James Storm	July 14, 2016	Impact Wrestling	Orlando, FL	1	28	This episode aired on tape delay on August 4, 2016.	
25	Lashley	August 11, 2016	Impact Wrestling	Orlando, FL	1	1	This was a Winner Takes All match, also for Lashley's TNA World Heavyweight Championship and TNA X Division Championship.	
—	Deactivated	August 12, 2016	Impact Wrestling	Orlando, FL	—	—	Lashley unified the championship with his TNA World Heavyweight Championship, however at the August 13, 2016 tapings of Impact Wrestling, TNA President Billy Corgan announced that the title would be deactivated and retired. This episode aired on tape delay on August 18, 2016.	

== Combined reigns ==
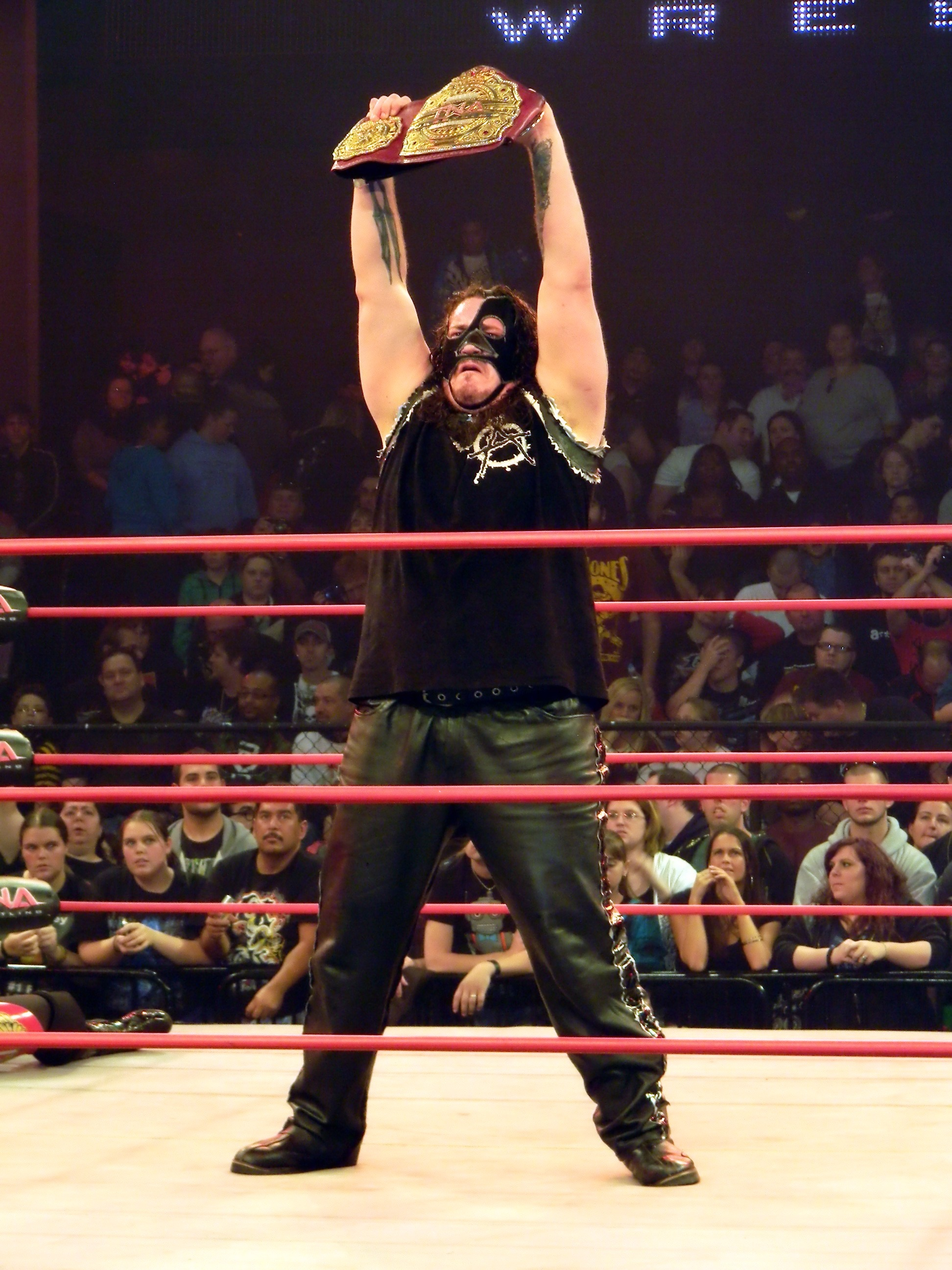
The longest-reigning and two-time champion Abyss

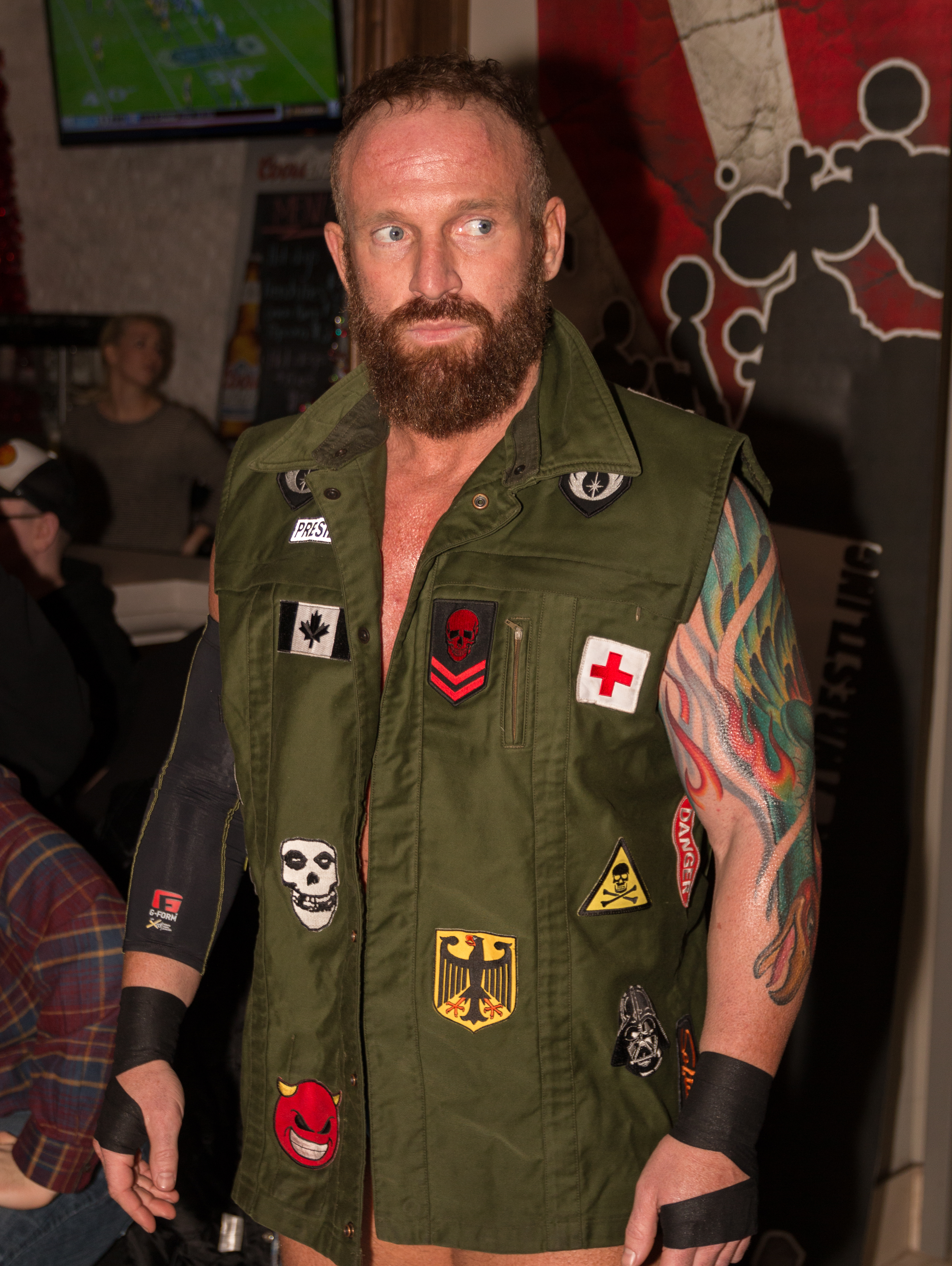
Record three-time champion Eric Young. Young is the only wrestler to have held the title under all four of its incarnations.

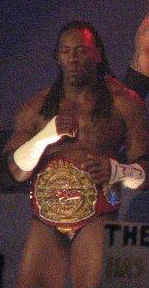
Inaugural TNA Legends Champion Booker T

Rank^{[A]}	Wrestler	No. of reigns	Combined days
1	Abyss	2	460
2	Devon	2	370
3	Eric Young	3	354
4	A.J. Styles	2	271
5	Rob Terry	1	167
6	Bobby Roode	1	162
7	Booker T	1	143
8	Robbie E	1	126
9	Eli Drake	1	82
10	Samoa Joe	1	70
11	Kevin Nash	2	66
12	Gunner	1	64
13	Bram	1	35
13	Douglas Williams	1	35
15	Jeff Jarrett	1	29
16	James Storm	1	28
17	Mick Foley	1	25
18	Lashley	1	1
18	PJ Black	1	1

== Footnotes ==
A. Each wrestler's total number of days as champion is ranked highest to lowest; wrestlers with the same number are tied for that certain rank.
