= Debra Maggart =

American politician (born 1960)

Member of the Tennessee House of Representatives from the 45th district
- In office 2004–2012
- Preceded by: Diane Black
- Succeeded by: Courtney Rogers

Personal details
- Born: October 11, 1960 (age 66)
- Party: Republican

Debra Young Maggart (born October 11, 1960) is an American politician and the former Republican Caucus Chairman of the Tennessee House of Representatives. She was elected to represent the 45th district, which is part of Sumner County. She served in the state legislature from 2004 to 2012.

== Early life and career ==
Maggart earned a Bachelor of Arts in advertising degree from Western Kentucky University in 1982. She graduated with a Master of Arts degree from the Institute of Conflict Management at Lipscomb University in 2019.

== Political career ==
A Republican, Maggart was a delegate to the 2004 Republican National Convention and 2012 Republican National Convention. She was elected to the Tennessee House of Representatives from the 45th district in 2004, serving from 2004 to 2012. Maggart was elected House Republican Whip and House Republican Caucus Chair, and served on the House committees on Education, Government Operations, Judiciary, Calendar and Rules, Finance, Health, Transportation, and Family and Children Affairs.

She has also served as a Rule 31 Listed Mediator in the field of General Civil Mediation under Rule 31 of the Rules of the Tennessee Supreme Court.

== Business career ==
Maggart is senior vice president of CivicPoint LLC, a subsidiary of Frost Brown Todd. CivicPoint is a full-service government relations, lobbying, and public relations firm. Maggart serves on the board of directors the Tennessee Lobbyist Association, and was a board member of the Western Kentucky University Alumni Association from 2012 to 2015. She has been a member of the chambers of commerce of Hendersonville, Goodlettsville and Gallatin.

== Personal life ==
Maggart is a member of Phi Mu. She was awarded the March of Dimes Legislator Recognition in 2011.

Political offices
Preceded by Diane Black	Tennessee State Representative, 45th District; 2004–2012	Succeeded by Courtney Rogers
