= Courtney Rogers =

American politician (born 1958)

Tennessee Commissioner of Veterans Services
- In office January 19, 2019 – December 7, 2020
- Preceded by: Many-Bears Grinder
- Succeeded by: Tommy H. Baker

Member of the Tennessee House of Representatives from the 45th district
- In office January 8, 2013 – January 8, 2019
- Preceded by: Debra Maggart
- Succeeded by: Johnny Garrett

Personal details
- Born: December 26, 1958 (age 67) Honolulu, Hawaii
- Party: Republican
- Education: University of Southern California; Central Michigan University

Military service
- Branch/service: United States Air Force
- Rank: Lieutenant colonel

Courtney Rogers (born December 26, 1958, in Honolulu, Hawaii) is an American politician and a former Republican member of the Tennessee House of Representatives, representing District 45 from 2013 until 2019.

On December 27, 2018, Governor-elect Bill Lee announced his intention to name Rogers to his cabinet, as his Commissioner of the Department of Veterans Services. In December 2020, Rogers resigned the position as Commissioner of the Department of Veterans Services.

== Education ==
Rogers earned her BS in international relations from University of Southern California and her MPA from Central Michigan University.

== Elections ==
- 2012 Rogers challenged District 45 incumbent Representative Debra Maggart in the August 2, 2012, Republican Primary, winning with 4,646 votes (57.4%) and won the November 6, 2012, General election with 19,972 votes (73.4%) against Democratic nominee Jeanette Jackson.

== Community involvement ==
Rogers is a colonel in the Tennessee State Guard.
