= NWA Southern All-Star Wrestling =

Southern All-Star Wrestling (SAW)
- Acronym: SAW
- Founded: 2007
- Style: Professional wrestling
- Headquarters: Grandview, Tennessee
- Founder(s): Reno Riggins, Paul Adams, TJ Weatherby
- Owner(s): Reno Riggins and TJ Weatherby (2007-2009); Reno Riggins (2009-2013); National Wrestling Alliance (2013-2014) John Jason Womack (2014-Present)
- Formerly: Southern All-Star Wrestling (2007-2009, 2019-present); Showtime All-Star Wrestling (2009-2012); NWA Southern All-Star Wrestling (2012-2019)
- Website: nwasaw.tv

Showtime All-Star Wrestling and NWA Southern All-Star Wrestling is an American professional wrestling promotion based in Rockwood, Tennessee.

== History ==
SAW began in April 2007, started then business partners Reno Riggins and TJ Weatherby at Weatherby's "SAW Mill," in Millersville, Tennessee. In 2009, Riggins left. He then began to run shows in Nashville, at the Tennessee State Fairgrounds.

SAW then ran shows at the Former Freddie Morton's Auction House (redubbed the new "SAW Mill") which became an Antique Shop in Columbia, Tennessee, and at the Old Armory Building in Pulaski, Tennessee.

Until 2012, SAW toured as well. On November 11, 2012 SAW teamed with the NWA (National Wrestling Alliance) to form the New NWA SAW, in addition, SAW returned to Millersville, Tennessee and changed their format, going under the all new NWA SAW Branding. As of March 2013, NWA SAW moved out of the SAWMill in Millersville, and organized events in venues across Middle Tennessee. The company went under new ownership in 2014. Sold by NWA President Bruce Tharpe to John Jason Womack, this purchase gave him permission to use the NWA logos on all SAW belts. SAW do shows weekly in Rockwood, Spring City, and Dayton.

== Television ==
SAW began broadcasting exclusively on Comcast Cable channel 49 on Saturday nights at midnight. In 2009, SAW moved to Nashville's WNAB, broadcasting on Saturday nights at 8:00 P.M, and became syndicated. In the fall of 2013, SAW left WNAB for the internet until 2014 when SAW returned to Comcast Cable channel 49 on Saturday nights at midnight. In 2016 It then moved to CW20WBXX out of Knoxville The air times for NWA Explosion is Saturday Nights and Thursday nights from 7pm to 11pm on the CW20 @2024

== Roster ==
=== Male wrestlers ===
Ring name	Notes
Night Wolf	
Gravestone	
Justin Brake	
Popa Billys Boys	
Wolfie D	
Big Red	
Chris Harris	
Mask Destroyer	
Chris Classic	
Jed Anderson	
Drew Haskins	NWA World Tag-Team Champion
Blue Demon	
Shark Boy	
Shane Morton	
Southern Kaos	
Christian Rage	
Dragon Master	
Jason Fitzpatrick	NWA World Champion and NWA TV Champion
The Masked Assassin	
Billy HAVOC	
Silver King	
Chris Stevens	NWA World Tag-Team Champion
Tony Dalton	
Southern Rebel Denny Ray	NWA Southern Heavyweight Champion
Robert Mullican	
Nick Iggy	
Nore Havoc	
Shane Williams	
Shawn Hoodrich	
Matt Cardona	
Marc Sharp	
JP Magnum	
Corey Crews	

=== Female wrestlers ===
Ring name	Notes
Eve	
Hallie Shadows	
Heidi Lovelace	
Miss Rachel	
Taeler Hendrix	

=== Stables ===
Team name	Members	Notes
The Bullet Club	Jason Fitzpatrick Drew Haskins Chris Stevens	NWA World and tv and Tag-Team Champions
Divided Nation	Tony Dalton and Dragon Master	
The Funky White Boys	Chris Classic And Jed Anderson	
Havoc Brothers	Nore and Billy Havoc	

=== On-air talent ===
- Jason Womack - SAW Operation Manager
- Jason Womack - SAW Promoter
- Mark Madden– Play-by-play Commentator
- Kevin Kelly - Play-by-play Commentator
- David Penser- Ring Announcer
- Mr Keith- Manager
- JT Hott - Manager
- Tom Gunn - Manager
- Jimmy Street - Manager
- Lekisha Oliver - Media Relations
- Krull - Media Production
- Jason Womack – SAW Management
- Mike Sircy - NWA Management
- Nick Patrick – Referee
- Gene Johnson - Referee

== Championships ==
Championship	Champion(s)	Previous	Date Won	Location
NWA Television Championship	Jason Fitzpatrick	Beat HammerJack in Tournament Finals	September 10, 2022	Rockwood, TN
NWA Southern Heavyweight Championship	The Southern Rebel Denny Ray	Beat Billy Havoc in a one on one match	December 10, 2022	Pigeon Forge, TN
NWA Southern Tag Team Championship	THE Bullet Club	They beat the Havoc brothers in a Tag-Team match	December 3, 2022	Pigeon Forge, TN
NWA Worlds Heavyweight Championship	Blue Demon Jr	Beat Jason Fitzpatrick with a Chair to win	December 17, 2022	Pigeon Forge, TN

== See also ==
- List of National Wrestling Alliance territories
- List of independent wrestling promotions in the United States
