= Millersville, Tennessee =

- City
- Location of Millersville in Robertson County, Tennessee
- Coordinates: 36°22′16″N 86°42′36″W
- Country: United States
- State: Tennessee
- Counties: Sumner, Robertson

Government
  - Mayor: Jesse Powell
  - City Manager: Michael Housewright

Area
  - Total: 13.80 sq mi (35.75 km^{2})
  - Land: 13.80 sq mi (35.75 km^{2})
  - Water: 0 sq mi (0.00 km^{2})
- Elevation: 502 ft (153 m)

Population (2020)
  - Total: 6,299
  - Density: 456.3/sq mi (176.19/km^{2})
- Time zone: UTC-6 (Central (CST))
  - Summer (DST): UTC-5 (CDT)
- FIPS code: 47-48980
- GNIS feature ID: 1293977
- Website: www.cityofmillersville.com

Millersville is a city in Robertson and Sumner counties, Tennessee. The population was 6,229 at the 2020 United States census.

== Geography ==
According to the United States Census Bureau, the city has a total area of 13.5 square miles (35 km^{2}), all land.

== Demographics ==
Historical population
Census	Pop.	Note	%±
1990	2,575		—
2000	5,308		106.1%
2010	6,440		21.3%
2020	6,299		−2.2%

=== 2020 Census ===
Racial composition as of the 2020 census
Race	Number	Percentage
White	4,868	77.3%
Black or African American	544	8.6%
American Indian and Alaska Native	23	0.4%
Asian	55	0.9%
Native Hawaiian and Other Pacific Islander	9	0.1%
Some other race	337	5.4%
Two or more races	463	7.4%
Hispanic or Latino (of any race)	755	12.0%

As of the 2020 census, there was a population of 6,299, with 2,451 households and 1,663 families residing in the city.

The median age was 36.9 years. 23.6% of residents were under the age of 18 and 12.2% of residents were 65 years of age or older. For every 100 females there were 98.6 males, and for every 100 females age 18 and over there were 97.5 males age 18 and over.

72.2% of residents lived in urban areas, while 27.8% lived in rural areas.

There were 2,451 households in Millersville, of which 36.3% had children under the age of 18 living in them. Of all households, 48.7% were married-couple households, 20.5% were households with a male householder and no spouse or partner present, and 23.0% were households with a female householder and no spouse or partner present. About 24.5% of all households were made up of individuals and 8.7% had someone living alone who was 65 years of age or older.

There were 2,580 housing units, of which 5.0% were vacant. The homeowner vacancy rate was 0.6% and the rental vacancy rate was 6.4%.

=== 2000 Census ===
As of the census of 2000, there was a population of 5,308, with 1,990 households and 1,484 families residing in the city. The population density was 393.2 inhabitants per square mile (151.8/km^{2}). There were 2,098 housing units at an average density of 155.4 units per square mile (60.0 units/km^{2}). The racial makeup of the city was 93.99% White, 3.52% African American, 0.47% Native American, 0.64% Asian, 0.02% Pacific Islander, 0.55% from other races, and 0.81% from two or more races. Hispanic or Latino of any race were 1.51% of the population.

There were 1,990 households, out of which 38.5% had children under the age of 18 living with them, 58.0% were married couples living together, 11.1% had a female householder with no husband present, and 25.4% were non-families. 19.1% of all households were made up of individuals, and 3.6% had someone living alone who was 65 years of age or older. The average household size was 2.66 and the average family size was 3.02.

In the city, the population was spread out, with 27.9% under the age of 18, 9.1% from 18 to 24, 36.4% from 25 to 44, 20.2% from 45 to 64, and 6.4% who were 65 years of age or older. The median age was 32 years. For every 100 females, there were 103.3 males. For every 100 females age 18 and over, there were 98.9 males.

The median income for a household in the city was $40,840, and the median income for a family was $47,868. Males had a median income of $31,013 versus $24,057 for females. The per capita income for the city was $17,764. About 9.9% of families and 11.8% of the population were below the poverty line, including 15.3% of those under age 18 and 16.0% of those age 65 or over.
