= Independence Rage (2026) =

2026 Ohio Valley Wrestling event

- Promotional poster
- Promotion: Ohio Valley Wrestling
- Date: July 19, 2026
- City: Louisville, Kentucky
- Venue: Hotpoint Davis Arena

Ohio Valley Wrestling event chronology
← Previous; Collision Course	Next → NCG/OVW Head Games

Independence Rage was a professional wrestling livestreaming event produced by Ohio Valley Wrestling (OVW). It took place on July 19, 2026, at the Hotpoint Davis Arena in Louisville, Kentucky and was streamed live on YouTube and TNA+.

== Production ==
=== Background ===
On November 7, 2011, OVW and Total Nonstop Action Wrestling (TNA) had reached an agreement for the former to become an official training and developmental territory. This agreement would end on November 2, 2013, due to a financial dispute.

On March 2, 2019, OVW and Impact taped the Clash in the Bluegrass pay-per-view as part of Impact's One Night Only pay-per-view series at the Davis Arena which aired on March 9, 2019, on the Global Wrestling Network. In late March 2019, TNA, then known as Impact Wrestling, signed another agreement with OVW in which the promotion would serve as its developmental territory once again. On February 22, 2020, Impact Wrestling and OVW teamed up again to present the Sacrifice special from the Davis Arena which was aired live on Impact Plus.

On December 18, 2021, Impact held the Throwback Throwdown II special at the Davis Arena which streamed live on Impact Plus. The event featured wrestlers from Impact and OVW portraying 1980s wrestlers in the fictional Impact Provincial Wrestling Federation (IPWF).

On June 18, 2026, it was reported by PW Insider that TNA and OVW were in talks to sign a working agreement in which OVW would become a developmental partner for TNA for the third time. On July 16, 2026, TNA announced on their social media pages that they would stream OVW's Independence Rage event on TNA+ for free. On July 17, 2026, OVW announced that WWE Hall of Famer Road Dogg would make an appearance during the event.

=== Storylines ===
Independence Rage featured professional wrestling matches that involves different wrestlers from pre-existing scripted feuds and storylines. Wrestlers portrayed villains, heroes, or less distinguishable characters in scripted events that built tension and culminated in a wrestling match or series of matches. Storylines were produced on Ohio Valley Wrestling's various events and on their weekly shows, OVW Rise and OVW Overdrive.

== Matches ==
No.	Results	Stipulations	Times
1^{P}	Leela Hall defeated Janie Hartman by pinfall	Singles match	—
2^{P}	Ashton Adonis defeated Austin Ryker	Singles match	—
3	Brendan Balling defeated JJ Lawson (c)	Singles match for the OVW Rush Division Championship	13:36
4	Adam Revolver and Tony Gunn defeated LVL 3 (Jay Three & Kirko Ky)	Tag team match	—
5	Colby Carter defeated Meto by pinfall	Singles match	—
6	Stephen Steel defeated Drew Hernandez (c) (with Tommy Boy) by pinfall	Singles match for the OVW Media Championship	—
7	TW3 defeated Icon Lee by pinfall	Strap match	—
8	Only Bros (Boy Toy Troy and Star Player Prime) (c) defeated Anthony Toatele and Erik Surge, The Trifecta (Jake Lawless and Jake Painter), and The Troublemakers (Canaan Kristopher and Glenn Spectre) by pinfall	Tag team Texas tornado match	—
9	Kal Herro defeated Seven by pinfall	Respect match	—
10	Dustin Jackson defeated Jay DeNiro (c) by pinfall	Singles match for the OVW Heavyweight Championship	—
11	J-Rod defeated Lovely Miss Larkan (c) by pinfall	Singles match for the OVW Women's Championship	—
12	Kid Colossus (with Percival Goodington XIII, and Super Z) defeated Tony Evans (c) (with Drew Hernandez, Lovely Miss Larkan, and Tommy Boy) by pinfall	Singles match for the OVW United States Championship	—
(c) / – the champion(s) heading into the match; P / – the match was broadcast on the pre-show
