= Mahabali Shera =

Indian professional wrestler (born 1990)

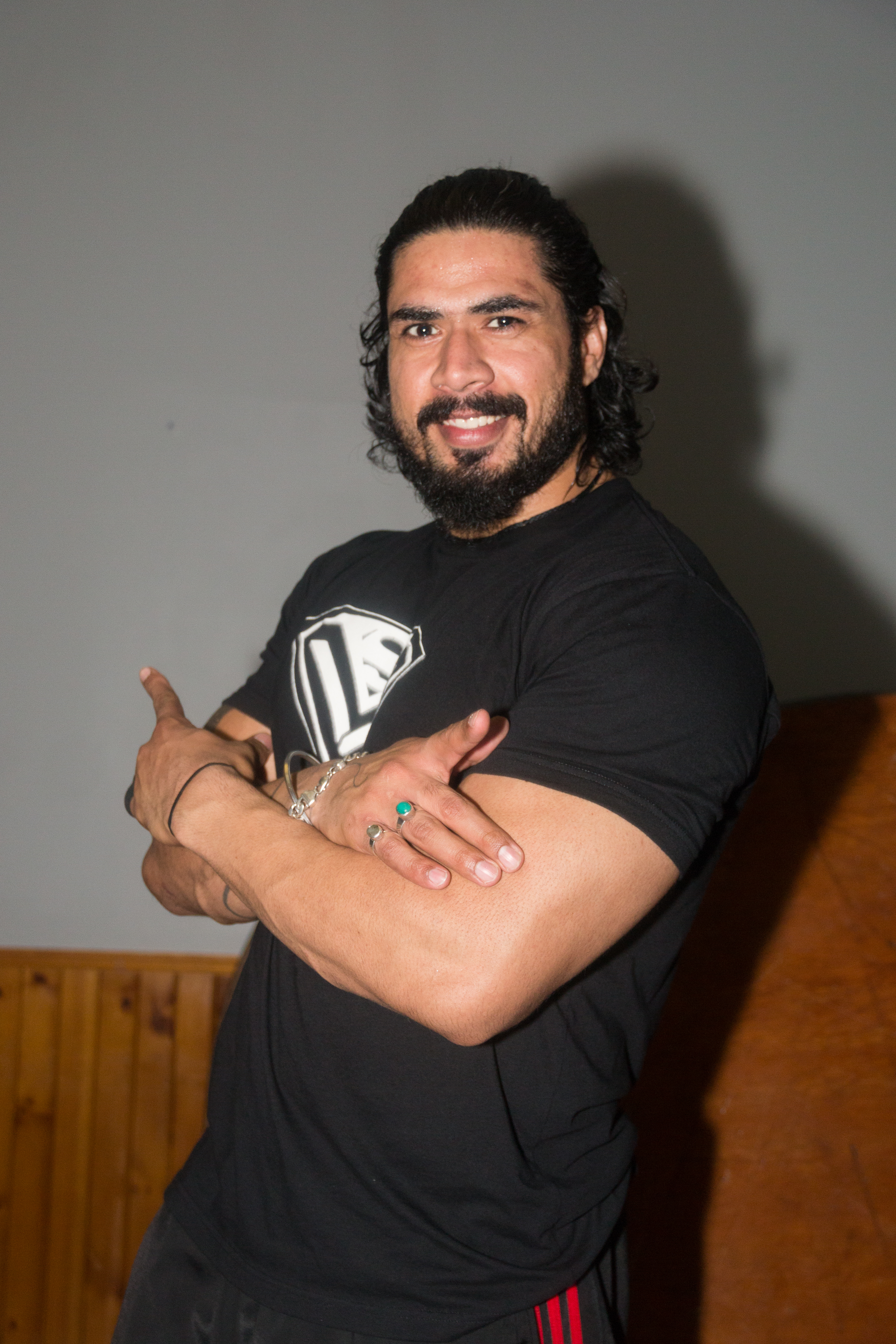
- Shera in September 2017

Personal information
- Born: Amanpreet Singh Randhawa; 17 October 1990 (age 36) Firozpur, Punjab, India

Professional wrestling career
- Ring name(s): Amanpreet Singh; Khoya; Mahabali Shera; Mahabali Veera; Shera
- Billed height: 6 ft 4 in (193 cm)
- Billed weight: 242 lb (110 kg)
- Billed from: Punjab, India
- Trained by: Al Snow; Hoody; Riga; Savio Vega
- Debut: 2011

Amanpreet Singh Randhawa (born 2 May 1990) is an Indian professional wrestler, He is best known for his time in Ohio Valley Wrestling (OVW) and in Total Nonstop Action Wrestling (TNA), where he performed under the ring name Mahabali Shera or simply Shera. He also had a brief stint under contract with WWE in 2018.

== Professional wrestling career ==
=== Total Nonstop Action Wrestling / Impact Wrestling (2011-2017) ===
==== Ring Ka King (2011–2012) ====
In December 2011, under the ring name Mahabali Veera, he took part in the India project Ring Ka King, backed by Total Nonstop Action Wrestling (TNA). He competed in the RKK World Heavyweight Championship tournament to crown the inaugural champion, and he defeated Dr. Nicholas Dinsmore in the quarterfinals of the tournament before being defeated by Scott Steiner in the semifinals. During the final week of tapings, on 21 April 2012, Veera defeated Sir Brutus Magnus to become the final RKK World Heavyweight Champion.

==== The Revolution (2014–2015) ====
On 22 September 2014, it was announced that he would debut in the following weeks. On 12 November episode of Impact Wrestling, Manik attempted to introduce him to the leader of The Revolution stable, James Storm, before Storm demanded Manik to send Shera away. On 7 January 2015, his ring name changed to Khoya, officially joining The Revolution. On 23 January episode of Impact Wrestling, Khoya made his in-ring debut, defeating Tigre Uno. On 10 April, Khoya defeated Manik and Abyss in a 3-Way match to join James Storm in a qualifier match to participate in the 4-Way Tag Team Ultimate X Match for the vacant TNA World Tag Team Championship in a losing effort.

On 26 June episode of Impact Wrestling, Khoya turned face after being beaten and repeatedly insulted by James Storm, and subsequently entered into a feud with Storm. On 5 August episode of Impact Wrestling, he stood up to Storm, hit him with a sitout spinebuster, and officially changed his name to Mahabali Shera. On the 30 September episode of Impact Wrestling, Shera defeated Storm in a no disqualification match, ending their feud.

==== Various feuds (2015–2017) ====
On 4 October, at Bound For Glory, Shera competed in a 12-man Bound for Gold gauntlet match but was eliminated by Tyrus who went on to win the match. He then entered in the TNA World Title Series as a member in the Group Wild Card along with Crazzy Steve, Kenny King, and Aiden O'Shea for the vacated TNA World Heavyweight Championship. He ended first of his block when he became victorious in receiving nine points, thus advancing to the round of 16 where he defeated Eli Drake in the first round match. On the 9 December episode of Impact Wrestling, Shera lost to Lashley in the quarterfinals, failing to advance the round of four and being eliminated.

On 16 February 2016 episode of Impact Wrestling, Shera formed a new tag team Grado. On 29 March episode of Impact Wrestling, he was taken out by Al Snow who attacked Grado and broke his arm. On 12 April episode of Impact Wrestling, Shera and Snow had a harsh conversation in which Snow apologized to Shera and shook his hand. However, after Shera was getting out of the ring, Snow assaulted Shera from behind, leaving him lying near the steel steps. A week later, Shera lost to Snow after receiving a knuckle to the head. In his rematch against Snow on 10 May episode of Impact Wrestling, Grado came back and distracted Snow, allowing Shera to win.

In May 2017, Shera became involved in a storyline between Braxton Sutter and Kongo Kong. He saved Sutter and Allie from Kong, KM, Sienna, and Laurel Van Ness on the 18 May episode of Impact Wrestling. On 15 June episode of Impact Wrestling, Shera won a gauntlet match for the inaugural Sony SIX Invitational Trophy, last eliminating KM. At Slammiversary on 2 July, Shera teamed with Sutter and Allie to defeat KM, Kong and Van Ness in a six-person tag team match. His last match was on 11 November episode of Xplosion, where he defeated Caleb Konley. On 13 November 2017, his profile was officially removed from Impact Wrestling's website, confirming his departure from the company.

=== WWE (2018) ===
On 14 February 2018, Randhawa signed a contract with WWE, and subsequently reported to the WWE Performance Center. At a NXT live event on 1 March in Ocala, Florida, he made his debut with a win over Dan Matha. In September 2018, he was released from his WWE contract.

=== Return to Impact Wrestling/Total Nonstop Action Wrestling (2019–2024) ===
On 21 April 2019, it was announced that Randhawa had re-signed with Impact Wrestling following his release from WWE. Shera would make his return during the Impact tapings in Mexico at the end of a match between Desi Hit Squad members Rohit Raju and Raj Singh and Big Mami and Nino Hamburguesa, destroying the Deaners and affirming his loyalty to Gama Singh and the Desi Hit Squad, turning heel. Desi Hit Squad quietly disbanded after their 8 February loss to The Rascalz.

After a lengthy hiatus, Shera returned to Impact television when he aided former Desi Hit Squad stablemate Rohit Raju in a beatdown on Raju's rival and Impact X Division Champion TJP. On 17 July 2021, Shera teamed with Madman Fulton at Slammiversary in a losing effort against FinJuice.

On 23 September 2021, it was reported that Mahabali Shera was going to be out of action after reportedly dealing with an unknown injury.

On March 24, 2022, Shera returned to TNA on Before The Impact where he defeated Crazzy Steve. On the April 21 episode of Impact, Shera defeated Gabriel Rodriguez. on the Under Siege preshow, Shera and Raj Singh lost to Heath and Rhino. On the May 12 episode of Impact, Shera competed in the Gauntlet match which was won by Eric Young. On the May 26 episode of Impact, Shera and Raj Singh lost to Bhupinder Gujjar and W. Morrissey. On July 5 Impact Digital Media Match, Shera and Raj Singh lost to Johnny Swinger and Zicky Dice. On the July 28 episode of Impact, Shera lost to Josh Alexander. On the November 17 episode of Impact, Shera and Raj Singh lost a fatal four way tag team match to Bullet Club (Ace Austin and Chris Bey). On November 22 for an Impact Digital Media Match, Shera lost to Joe Hendry. On the November 24 Before The Impact, Shera and Raj Singh defeated Delirious and Yuya Uemura. on the December 15 Before The Impact, Shera defeated Jack Price.

On the January 12, 2023 Before The Impact, Shera and Raj Singh defeated Johnny Swinger and Zicky Dice. On January 24, Impact Digital Media Match, Shera and Raj Singh defeated Aiden Prince and Andrew Everett. On the February 9 episode of Impact, Shera lost to PCO. afterwards Shera and Champagne Singh lost back to back tag team matches against the teams of Heath and Rhino and the team of Frankie Kazarian and Rich Swann. On the Rebellion preshow, Shera and Champagne Singh defeated Heath and Rhino. On the May 4 episode of Impact, Shera, Champagne Singh and Steve Maclin lost to Heath, PCO and Rhino. On the June 8 episode of Impact, Shera lost to Heath. On June 15 Before The Impact, Shera and Champagne Singh defeated Jack Price and Laredo Kid. On the July 6 episode of Impact, Shera and Champagne Singh lost to Rich Swann and Sami Callihan. On the September 7 episode of Impact, Shera and Champagne Singh lost to Joe Hendry and Yuya Uemura.

On the January 26, 2024 episode of Xplosion, Shera lost to Rhino. on the February 9 episode of Xplosion, Shera lost to Jake Something. on the February 16 episode of Xplosion, Shera lost to Trent Seven. On the Emergence preshow, Shera lost to PCO in a TNA Digital Media Championship match failing to win the title.

=== Ohio Valley Wrestling (2019–2024) ===
On 22 October 2019, Shera made his Ohio Valley Wrestling debut, where he was defeated by Drew Hernandez in a dark match. On 10 December 2019, at OVW Christmas Choas Shera teamed with Jax Dane, Dimes and Corey Storm in an eight-man steel cage tag team match against The Legacy Of Brutality (Big Zo, Cash Flo, Hy-Zaya and Jay Bradley) in a losing effort. On 6 January 2020, on the first episode of OVW Overdrive, Shera faced Jay Bradley in a losing effort.

On 9 January 2021, Shera returned competing in the 2021 Nightmare Rumble for the OVW Heavyweight Championship which was won by Omar Amir.

On 15 January 2022, Shera made his return from injury to compete in the Nightmare Rumble for a chance to earn an OVW Heavyweight Championship match. On 5 March, Shera defeated Jessie Godderz at OVW March Mayhem to become the new OVW National Heavyweight Champion. On 7 July, Shera lost the championship to James Storm. On 24 November, Shera defeated Ca$h Flo to become the OVW Heavyweight Championship. On 13 December, Shera regained the National Heavyweight Championship against Ca$h Flo. On 22 June episode of OVW, Shera lost the OVW Heavyweight Championship to Ca$h Flo, ending his reign at 210 days.

== Slap fighting career ==
On 10 July 2026, Singh made his Power Slap debut at Power Slap 21, beating Jake Hager by third-round knockout.

== Filmography ==
=== Television ===
| Year | Title | Role | Notes |
|---|---|---|---|
| 2014 | CID | Himself | Episode 1160 |
| 2023 | Wrestlers | Himself | Episode 1 & 4 |

== Slap fighting record ==
Professional record breakdown
| 1 match | 1 win | 0 losses |
| By knockout | 1 | 0 |

| Res. | Record | Opponent | Method | Event | Date | Round | Time | Location | Notes |
|---|---|---|---|---|---|---|---|---|---|
| Win | 1–0 | Jake Hager | KO | Power Slap 21 | July 10, 2026 | 3 | N/A | Las Vegas, Nevada, United States | Slap fighting debut. |

== Personal life ==
Randhawa is a big fan of Bollywood and Amitabh Bachchan is his favorite actor from the industry. He belongs to the Jat Sikh community.

== Championships and accomplishments ==
- Ohio Valley Wrestling
  - OVW Heavyweight Championship (1 time)
  - OVW National Heavyweight Championship (2 times)
  - OVW Tag Team Championship (1 time) - with Cash Flo
  - Nightmare Cup (2023) - with Cash Flo
- Pro Wrestling All-Stars of Detroit
  - PWASD Heavyweight Championship (1 time)
- Pro Wrestling Illustrated
  - PWI ranked him #138 of the top 500 singles wrestlers in the PWI 500 in 2012
- Ring Ka King
  - RKK World Heavyweight Championship (1 time, final)
- Slam Wrestling
  - Slam Wrestling Heavyweight Championship (1 time)
- Total Nonstop Action Wrestling / Impact Wrestling
  - Global Impact Tournament (2015) – with Team International (Sonjay Dutt, Bram, Drew Galloway, The Great Muta, The Great Sanada, Magnus, Rockstar Spud, Tigre Uno, and Angelina Love)
  - Sony SIX Invitational Trophy (2017)
