= OVW National Heavyweight Championship =

Professional wrestling heavyweight championship

- Official design of the title (2020–2025)

Details
- Promotion: Ohio Valley Wrestling
- Date established: August 20, 2020
- Date retired: May 8, 2025
Statistics
- First champion: Jessie Godderz
- Final champion: Erik Surge
- Most reigns: Mahabali Shera; Jessie Godderz (2 reigns)
- Longest reign: Jessie Godderz (522 days)
- Shortest reign: Mahabali Shera (25 days)
- Oldest champion: Doug Basham (53 years, 30 days)
- Youngest champion: Mahabali Shera (31 years, 139 days)
- Heaviest champion: Ca$h Flo (339 lbs)
- Lightest champion: Jessie Godderz (220 lbs)

The OVW National Heavyweight Championship was a professional wrestling heavyweight championship created and promoted by the Ohio Valley Wrestling (OVW) promotion. There have been a total of seven reigns shared between five different champions. The final title holder was Erik Surge, who was in his first reign.

== Title history ==
As of October 4, 2026.

=== Reigns ===
Key
| No. | Overall reign number |
| Reign | Reign number for the specific champion |
| Days | Number of days held |
| <1 | Reign lasted less than a day |
| + | Current reign is changing daily |

| No. | Champion | Championship change | | | Reign statistics | | Notes | Ref. |
| No. | Champion | Date | Event | Location | Reign | Days | Notes | Ref. |
|---|---|---|---|---|---|---|---|---|
| 1 | Jessie Godderz | September 29, 2020 | OVW TV #1103 | Louisville, KY | 1 | 522 | This was a 21-man rumble match in which Godderz last eliminated Brian Pillman Jr. to become the inaugural champion. | |
| 2 | Mahabali Shera | March 5, 2022 | OVW Saturday Night Special: March Mayhem 2022 | Louisville, KY | 1 | 124 | | |
| 3 | James Storm | July 7, 2022 | OVW TV #1195 | Louisville, KY | 1 | 98 | | |
| 4 | Ca$h Flo | October 13, 2022 | OVW TV #1209 | Louisville, KY | 1 | 61 | This match was also for Storm's OVW Heavyweight Championship. | |
| 5 | Mahabali Shera | December 13, 2022 | OVW Christmas Chaos | Louisville, KY | 2 | 25 | | |
| 6 | Jessie Godderz | January 7, 2023 | OVW Nightmare Rumble | Louisville, KY | 2 | 318 | Won the Nightmare Rumble match to win the championship. | |
| 7 | EC3 | November 21, 2023 | Thanksgiving Thunder | Louisville, KY | 1 | 1,048 | | |
| 8 | Doug Basham | January 4, 2025 | OVW Nightmare Rumble 2025 | Louisville, KY | 1 | 110 | Cashed in his Key of Opportunity from winning the Nightmare Rumble 2025 to defeat EC3 and Ca$h Flo in a triple threat. | |
| 9 | Erik Surge | April 25, 2025 | OVW TV #1341 | Louisville, KY | 1 | 14 | | |
| — | Deactivated | May 8, 2025 | OVW TV #1343 | Louisville, KY | — | — | OVW executive Al Snow awards Surge with a new OVW United States Heavyweight championship, retiring the National Heavyweight title. | |

== Combined reigns ==
As of October 4, 2026.

| Rank | Wrestler | No. of reigns | Combined days |
|---|---|---|---|
| 1 | Jessie Godderz | 2 | 840 |
| 2 | EC3 | 1 | 418 |
| 3 | Mahabali Shera | 2 | 149 |
| 4 | Doug Basham | 1 | 110 |
| 5 | James Storm | 1 | 98 |
| 6 | Ca$h Flo | 1 | 61 |
| 7 | Erik Surge | 1 | 14 |
