= Jessie Godderz =

American professional wrestler, actor

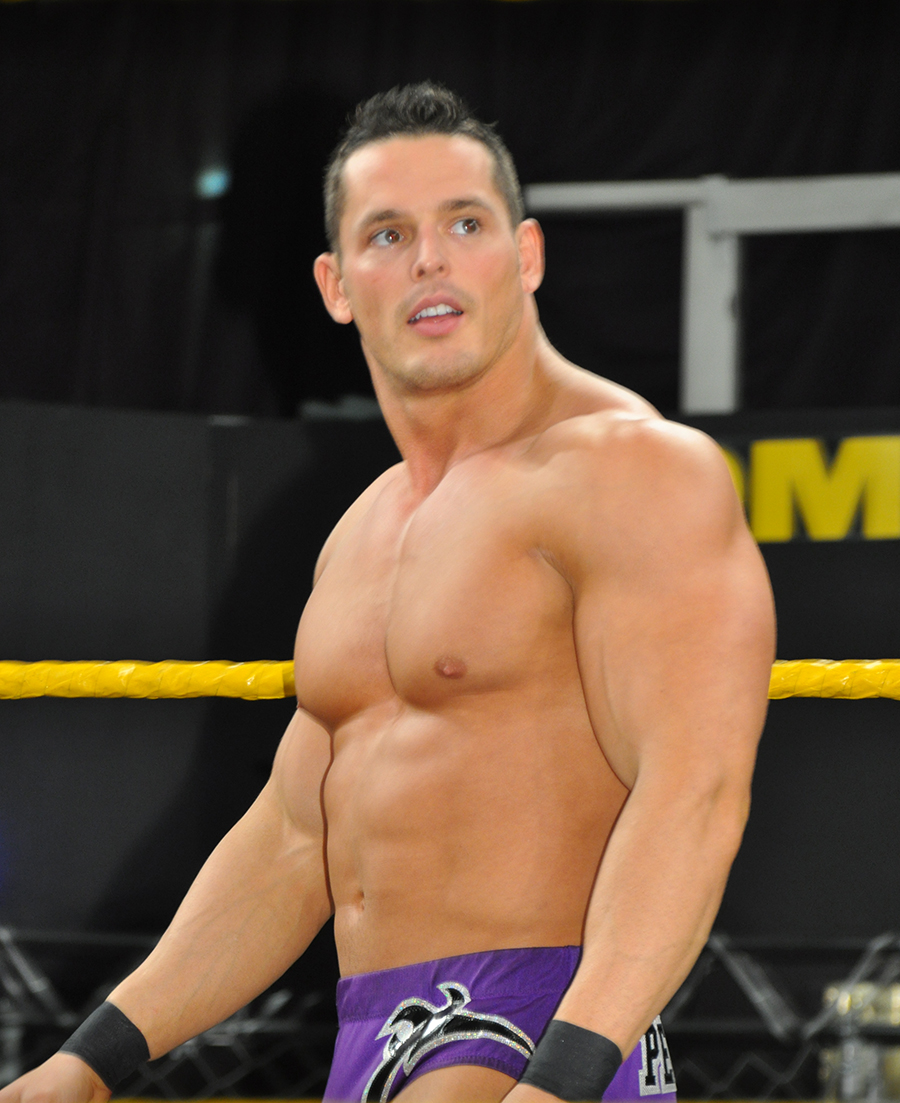
- Godderz in 2012

Personal information
- Born: April 23, 1986 (age 40) Mason City, Iowa, U.S.
- Children: 7
- Website: MrPec-tacular.com

Professional wrestling career
- Ring name(s): Jessie Godderz; Jesse; Mr. Pectacular
- Billed height: 5 ft 10 in (178 cm)
- Billed weight: 220 lb (100 kg)
- Billed from: Hollywood, California
- Trained by: Bubba Ray Dudley; D-Von Dudley; Ohio Valley Wrestling
- Debut: March 26, 2010

Jessie Godderz (born April 23, 1986), also known as Mr. PEC-Tacular, is an American professional wrestler and actor.

He is best known for his time in Total Nonstop Action Wrestling (TNA), where he is a former two-time TNA World Tag Team Champion with Robbie E as The BroMans.

He also previously competed for Ohio Valley Wrestling (OVW), where he is a former two-time OVW National Heavyweight Champion, one-time OVW Television Champion and a seven-time OVW Southern Tag Team Champion.

Prior to professional wrestling, he appeared as a contestant on two seasons of the CBS reality competition program Big Brother, where he now makes recurring annual appearances.

== Early life ==
Godderz was born in Mason City, Iowa, and raised on a farm in Rudd, Iowa. When he was 19 years old, he worked as a conductor for the Union Pacific Railroad. He became a professional bodybuilder with the World Natural Body Building Federation, and also became a Pro Wrestler, usually serving as "enhancement talent" with a higher loss-to-win ratio in order to highlight more successful wrestlers.

== Big Brother ==
=== Season 10 ===
In the summer of 2008, Godderz appeared as a contestant in the 10th season of Big Brother. During week 1, Head of Household Jerry nominated Godderz and fellow contestant Renny for elimination. He, however, won the Power of Veto and was able to remove himself from the chopping block. In week 2, Godderz won the Head of Household competition and nominated Steven and Dan for elimination. He was again nominated for elimination in week 3 but survived the eviction. Godderz was eliminated in week 4 by a 4–3 vote after being nominated for elimination by April with fellow contestant Memphis. He returned to the house for one day only on Day 60 as part of a luxury competition.

=== Season 11 ===
The following summer, Godderz returned to Big Brother for the 11th season. The twist for the season was that the HouseGuests would be split into four cliques. During the first Head of Household competition on the premiere episode, Godderz entered the house after his clique, the athletes, won the competition. Godderz was therefore named the first Head of Household of the season. On Day 19, Godderz once again became Head of Household. On Day 40, Jeff exercised the power of Coup d'État and named Godderz and fellow contestant Natalie as the nominees up for eviction. He was evicted on Day 40 by a vote of 3–2, becoming the first member of the Jury—a group of former HouseGuests that decide the competition winner.

=== Other appearances ===
Since appearing on both Big Brother 10 and Big Brother 11, Godderz has returned to the series for surprise visits.

Godderz then returned as a part of the Pandora's Box twist. During Big Brother 12, he offered Head of Household Britney fitness advice after she opened the box.

During Big Brother 13, Pandora's Box offered the HouseGuests a shopping spree with Tori Spelling. However, Rachel, the Head of Household, was locked inside Pandora's Box with Godderz for a shopping spree of "Mr. Pec-tacular" merchandise while the rest of the house earned the shopping spree with Spelling.

He made another appearance on Big Brother 14 when Head of Household Ian opened Pandora's Box. As a result, Godderz came into the house as Secret Santa and replaced all of the HouseGuests' junk food with healthier food.

He made another appearance on Big Brother 16 on a special Media Day episode of the series that aired exclusively on CBS.com.

He made another appearance on Big Brother 17 to host the Veto Competition "Bowlerina."

He made another appearance on Big Brother 18 to host the Luxury Competition "Dunk a Hunk."

He made another appearance on Big Brother 19 as a member of the BB Revengers in the BB Movie Trailer.

He made another appearance on Celebrity Big Brother during the dance number of the premiere episode as former houseguest Paul sang his introduction.

He made another appearance on Big Brother 20 to host the Veto Competition named after him, "Space PECS."

He made another appearance on Big Brother 21 with a Movie Poster cameo during the BB Comics Veto Competition.

He made another appearance on Big Brother 27 as the Big Brother Shirtless Sherlock.

He made another appearance also on Big Brother 27 as the masked Big Brother Mastermind who exacted revenge on all of the houseguests throughout the season for being unfairly targeted for eviction in Season 11.

He appeared once again to host the week 3 HOH competition on Big Brother 28.

== House of Villains ==
Godderz was a contestant on season 2 of House of Villains. He made it to the finale, and his vote decided who won the prize of $200,000. On the show, Goddarz was best known for his initial alliance with Wes Bergmann that devolved into a feud. Part of this feud was rooted in the fact that Bergmann pushed Godderz to eliminate Kandy Muse, a move Goddarz came to deeply regret. The season came to a dramatic end when Godderz ordered Bergmann to get on his knees and beg for the money. Bergmann half-heartedly complied, but Godderz nevertheless chose Safaree Samuels as the winner.

== Professional wrestling career ==
=== Early career ===
Godderz has said that after his time on Big Brother he met Ric Flair at a gym in Venice, California, and asked him how to get into the wrestling business. "This was at the peak of The Miz feuding with John Cena during that WrestleMania, and I saw that and knew, if he could do it, why not me?"

In 2010, Godderz was first seen wrestling at the promotion WFX Wrestling, based in Canada. Godderz appeared on their weekly TV program "WFX Overload". Godderz was first introduced by Johnny Fairplay on an episode of "WFX Overload".

=== Total Nonstop Action Wrestling ===
==== Ohio Valley Wrestling (2011–2012) ====
In 2011, Godderz signed a contract with professional wrestling promotion Total Nonstop Action Wrestling (TNA) and was sent down to their developmental territory, Ohio Valley Wrestling (OVW), for further training. On January 11, 2012, Godderz and Marcus Anthony defeated Johnny Spade and Shiloh Jonze to win the OVW Southern Tag Team Championship, but lost to them seven days later in a rematch with Spade and Jonze. On February 22, 2012, Godderz, Rob Terry and Rudy Switchblade defeated Jason Wayne and Shiloh Jonze in a handicap match to win the Southern Tag Team Championship. The team's reign ended on April 7, when Godderz and Rudy Switchblade, who was also recognized as champion under "The Family Rule," were defeated by Anarquia and Raul LaMotta. On April 11, 2012, Godderz and Switchblade defeated Anarquia and Raul LaMotta twice in two rematches for the Southern Tag Team Championship. On June 20, 2012, OVW Board of Directors member Ken Wayne stripped the titles away from Godderz and Switchblade after referee Chris Sharpe allowed them to cheat to win the titles, causing the titles to be vacated. On July 7, 2012, Godderz and Rudy Switchblade defeated Paredyse and Brandon Espinosa in a ladder match to win the vacant Southern Tag Team Championship for the fifth time. On December 1, 2012, Godderz and Switchblade were defeated by Alex Silva and Sam Shaw for the Southern Tag Team Championship.

==== Relationship with Tara (2012–2013) ====
On October 14, 2012, at Bound for Glory, Godderz made his Impact debut on the main roster as Tara's "Hollywood boyfriend". Godderz, billed simply as "Jesse," made his in-ring debut on the November 1 episode of Impact Wrestling, defeating ODB in an intergender match, following interference from Tara. On the November 8 episode of Impact, Jesse teamed up with Tara in a losing effort to ODB in an intergender handicap match. After the match they attacked ODB. Jesse made his pay-per-view debut three days later at Turning Point, teaming with Tara in a losing effort to ODB and Eric Young. On the following episode of Impact Wrestling, Jesse defeated Young in a singles match. The following week, Jesse was pinned by Young in a three-way match, which also included Robbie E, and forced to wear a turkey suit as part of the Thanksgiving theme.

Jesse, now billed as Jessie Godderz, main evented Impact Wrestling for the first time on December 13, losing to Bully Ray despite outside interference from Tara. During the next two months, Godderz interfered in Tara's matches, especially ones relating to her title. After interfering in Tara's title match with Velvet Sky, Sky gained vengeance on the couple by teaming with James Storm on the January 31, 2013, episode of Impact Wrestling to defeat them in a mix tag team match. The following week, Godderz was defeated by Storm in a singles match.

==== The BroMans (2013–2015) ====
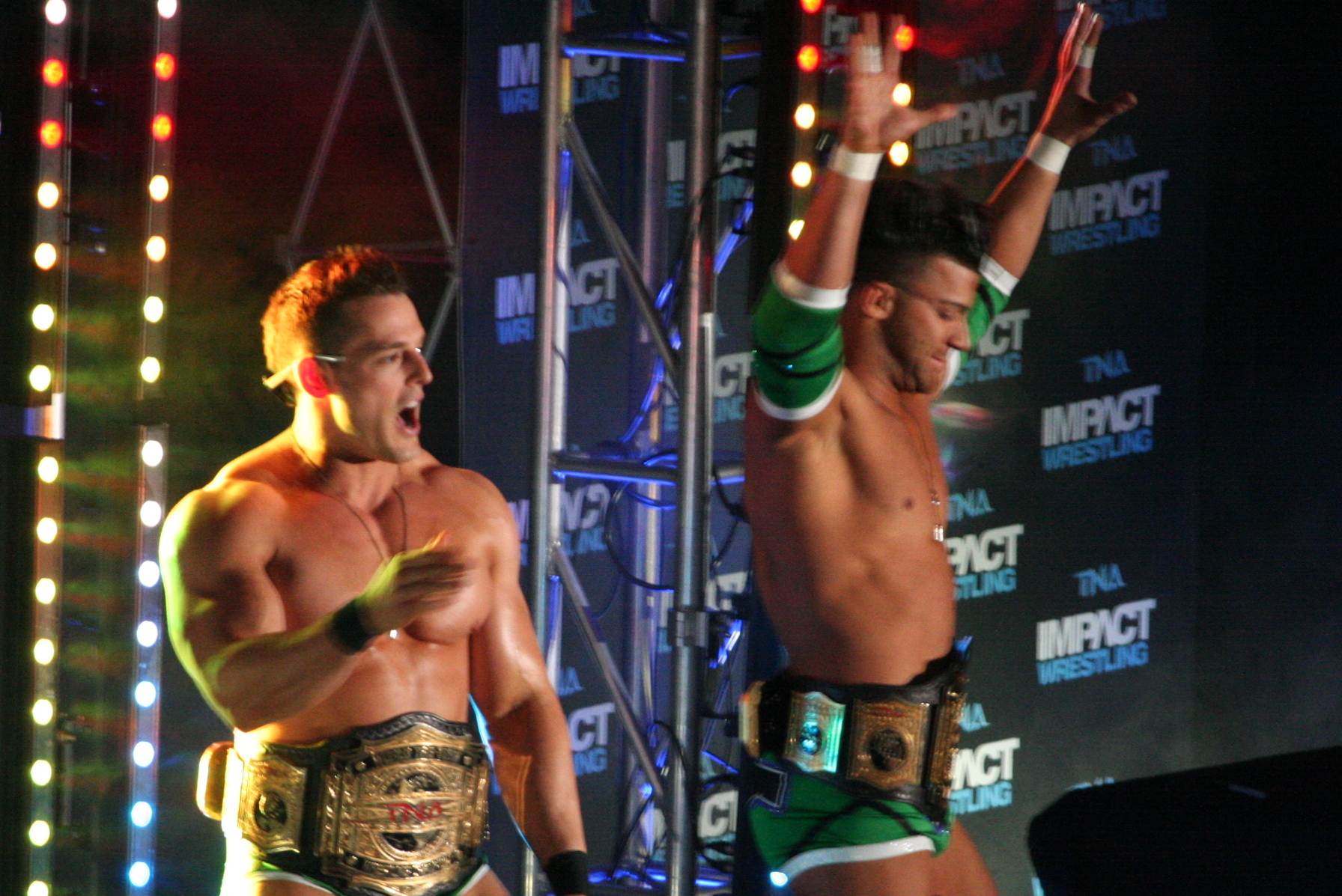
Godderz with Robbie E (right) as the TNA World Tag Team Champions in April 2014

Godderz started allying himself with Robbie E on the May 2 episode of Impact Wrestling, and the duo teamed with Joey Ryan in a handicap match against Rob Terry, which the team lost after Godderz and Robbie walked out on Ryan and left him to be pinned. On the June 27 episode of Impact Wrestling, Godderz and Robbie, accompanied by Tara, confronted Impact World Tag Team Champions Gunner and James Storm and presented themselves as The BroMans. The following week, The BroMans were defeated by Gunner and Storm in a non-title match. Godderz's relationship with Tara ended on July 16, when she was released from her impact contract.

On October 27, during the Bound for Glory pre-show, accompanied by "Mr. Olympia" Phil Heath, the BroMans won a four-way tag team gauntlet to become the number one contenders for the Impact World Tag Team Championship later in the night, and they defeated Gunner and James Storm for the titles. The BroMans made their first televised title defense on the October 31 episode of Impact Wrestling, defeating Gunner and Storm in a rematch. The BroMans lost the titles against The Wolves during a house show on February 23, 2014. They regained the titles by defeating The Wolves and Team 246 (Kaz Hayashi and Shuji Kondo) at the Wrestle-1 Kaisen: Outbreak show in Tokyo, Japan on March 2. On April 26, at Sacrifice, The Bromans lost their titles to The Wolves in a 3 vs 2 handicap match with Zema Ion as their third partner.

On April 17, 2015, after losing a tag match to the Dirty Heels, Godderz and Robbie E got into a brawl, and Godderz left The Bromans.

==== Various feuds (2015–2016) ====
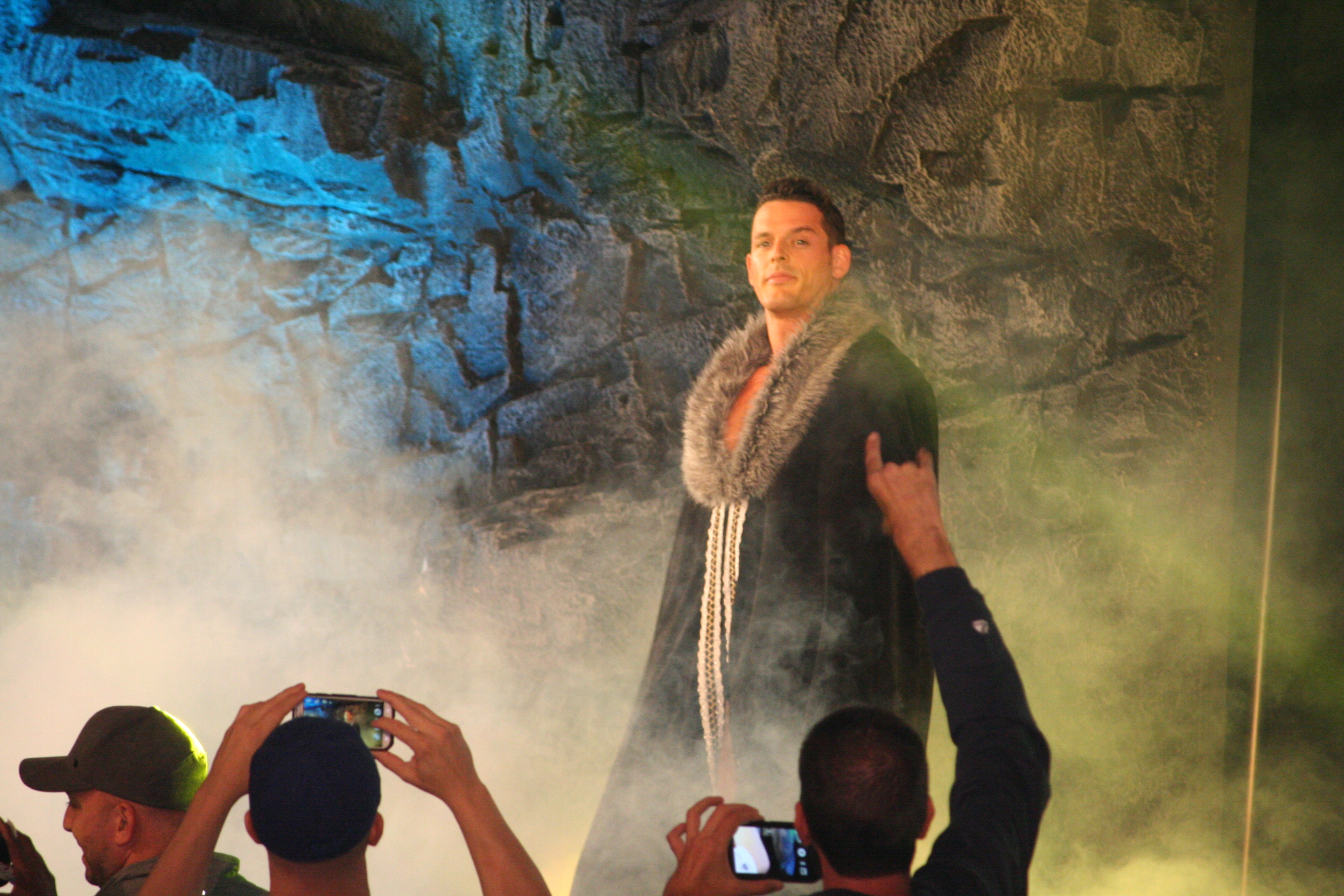
Godderz as The "Modern Day Adonis" Making his entrance at Impact Wrestling, in 2015

In June, Godderz began a new gimmick, where he acted full of himself and referred to himself as a Man's Man. He also attacked DJ Z before Robbie E saved him. On June 28, 2015, at Slammiversary, Godderz was defeated by his former BroMans partner Robbie E. Godderz would go on to face Robbie again in a street fight the following edition of Impact Wrestling which he won. On October 4, 2015, at Bound For Glory, Godderz competed in a twelve-man Bound For Gold Gauntlet match which was won by Tyrus. In October 2015 Godderz participated in the impact World Title Series as a member of group Future 4. Godderz ended Second of his block by defeating Micah and the returning Crimson (the only exception for Eli Drake) to advance the round of 16 where he defeated fellow Impact Knockout Awesome Kong to advance in the quarterfinals where he would be defeated in the round of 8 by Matt Hardy. At One Night Only Live. Godderz formed a dysfunctional tag team with Eli Drake and unsuccessfully challenged The Wolves for the Impact World Tag Team Championship also involving Drew Galloway and Kurt Angle. Godderz competed for the 2016 Feast or Fired match which he failed an attempt to win the briefcases. On the February 16, 2016, episode of Impact Wrestling, Godderz and Eli Drake are involved in the feud with Grado who wrestle under in disguise as Odarg The Great and the returning Mahabali Shera to build up to singles feud between Drake and Odarg, which he was defeated. On the February 23, 2016, at Impact Lockdown special episode of Impact Wrestling, which he was again defeated in the rematch by Odarg the Great when Drake took off his mask and fell into the arena floor.

==== The BroMans reunion (2016–2017) ====
On the March 22, 2016, episode of Impact Wrestling, Godderz reunited with Robbie E to face Beer Money, Inc. for the impact World Tag Team Championships, but were unsuccessful in winning the titles. On March 29, 2016, episode of Impact Wrestling, Godderz and Robbie E defeated Eric Young and Bram.

On June 9, 2017, Godderz confirmed his departure from Impact Wrestling.

=== Independent circuit (2017) ===
On November 9, 2017, Godderz teamed with fellow Big Brother contestant Austin Matelson under the team name Team Big Brother. They defeated HATE (Peter Avalon and Ray Rosas) in a match for Bar Wrestling.

=== Lucha Underground (2018) ===
Godderz made his Lucha Underground debut with a special guest appearance as Mr. PEC-Tacular, taking part in the Aztec Warfare match on the Season 4 premiere of Lucha Underground.

=== Return to Ohio Valley Wrestling (2019–present) ===
On April 24, 2019, Godderz won the OVW Television Championship. Two days later he lost the championship at OVW's Run the Ropes on April 26, 2019, to Drew Hernandez. On September 29, 2020, Godderz won a 21-man rumble match, where he last eliminated Brian Pillman Jr. to become the inaugural OVW National Heavyweight Champion.

On April 6, 2021, Godderz teamed with Tony Gunn, collectively known as The Pec-TacularGunns, defeating The Tate Twins to win the OVW Tag Team Championships. However, The Tate Twins regained the championships over one month later.

On March 5, 2022, Godderz lost the OVW National Heavyweight Champion to Mahabali Shera, ending his reign at 522 days.

The Pec-TacularGunns regained the OVW Tag Team Championships on May 19, 2022, when they defeated the teams of Bankroll (Ca$h Flo and Dimes), Darkkloudz (Deget Bundlez and Eric Darkstorm), and The Outrunners (Truth Magnum and Turbo Floyd) in a four corners match. However, they vacated the titles one week later.

On January 7, 2023, Godderz won the Nightmare Rumble and became the OVW National Heavyweight Championship for the second time. On November 21, 2023, Godderz lost the title to EC3 on OVW Thanksgiving Thunder.

In 2023 he appeared in the seven-part Netflix documentary series Wrestlers, which profiles the OVW. He is seen zipping around on his Segway.

== Personal life ==
Godderz grew up on a farm in Iowa and credits the daily chores for his work ethic. He has seven children.

== Filmography ==
Film
Year	Title	Role	Notes
2015	Kid Barbarian	Conan The Barbarian	

Television
Year	Title	Role	Notes
2005	Next	Himself	
2007	Exposed	Himself	
2008	Big Brother 10	Himself	Contestant
2008	The Late Late Show	Himself	
2009	Big Brother 11	Himself	Contestant
2009	The Early Show	Himself	
2010	Big Brother 12	Himself	Special CBS Big Brother Guest Star
2011	Big Brother 13	Himself	
2012	Big Brother 14	Himself	
2014	CAWL To Arms	Himself	Host
2014–20	Tainted Dreams	Dylan Buckwald	
2015	Big Brother 17	Himself	
2015–19	The Talk	Himself / Summertime Santa	5 episodes
2016	The Price Is Right	Himself	Special CBS Big Brother Guest Star
2016	Big Brother 18	Himself	
2016	Big Brother: After Dark	Himself	
2017	Snowfall	Lightning Rod	
2017	The Young and the Restless	Bouncer	
2017	AOL Build Series	Himself	Interview
2017	Big Brother 19	Himself	
2017	Entertainment Tonight	Himself	Interview
2018	Celebrity Big Brother	Himself	
2018–19	New Dogs, Old Tricks	Evan McLaine	
2018	TKO: Total Knock Out	Himself	Special CBS Big Brother Guest Star
2018	Big Brother 20	Himself	
2023	Wrestlers	Himself	
2024	House of Villains	Himself	Contestant (season 2)
2025	Big Brother 27	Big Brother Mastermind and Shirtless Sherlock	
2026	American Gladiators	Steel	
2026	Big Brother 28	Himself	
Year	Title Song	Role	Notes
2018–19	The Girl Is With Me	Performer	With Jeff Timmons

== Championships and accomplishments ==
- Ohio Valley Wrestling
  - OVW National Heavyweight Championship (2 times)
  - OVW Television Championship (1 time)
  - OVW Southern Tag Team Championship (7 times) (Note: During his second reign as Champion Godderz defended the title with either Terry or Switchblade under The Family Rule.) (Note: During Godderz 6th & 7th reigns the Championship was known as the OVW Tag Team Championship.) – with Rudy Switchblade (3), Rudy Switchblade and Rob Terry (1), Marcus Anthony (1) and Tony Gunn (2)
  - Nightmare Rumble (2023)
- Pro Wrestling Illustrated
  - Ranked No. 105 of the 500 top wrestlers of the year in the PWI 500 in 2014
- Total Nonstop Action Wrestling
  - TNA World Tag Team Championship (2 times) – with Robbie E
  - TNA Turkey Bowl (2013) – with Robbie E
  - TNA World Cup (2016) – with Jeff Hardy, Eddie Edwards, Robbie E and Jade
