= TNA World Title Series =

- Venue: Impact Zone
- Location: Orlando, Florida
- Start date: July 22, 2015 (Taped); October 7, 2015 (Aired)
- End date: January 5, 2016
- Competitors: See below

Champion
- Ethan Carter III

The TNA World Title Series was a professional wrestling round-robin tournament produced by Total Nonstop Action Wrestling (TNA). It was taped between July 22 and July 25, 2015 (except the semifinals and finals, which ran live on January 5, 2016), and aired from October 7, 2015 to January 5, 2016, on Impact Wrestling to determine the new TNA World Heavyweight Champion. The tournament was won by Ethan Carter III (EC3)

== Background ==
On October 7, 2015, it was announced that a tournament would take place, after TNA World Heavyweight Champion Matt Hardy vacated the title a day prior due to a legal injunction filed by former champion Ethan Carter III after Hardy defeated EC3 and Drew Galloway in a three-way match at Bound for Glory. The World Title Series placed 32 wrestlers into 8 groups of 4, with the first round being under a round-robin format which was called Group Play. Also, for the first time ever, the Knockouts would have a chance to compete for the World Heavyweight Championship. The tournament was taped in July. On November 12, 2015, TNA announced plans to hold the eliminations rounds of the tournament in Mumbai, India during TNA One Night Only, but the event had to be postponed due to logistical issues, causing them to air the original tournament that was taped back in late July instead. The company announced on the December 9 broadcast of Impact Wrestling that the semifinals and finals of the World Title Series would be held live on January 5, 2016, during the debut of Impact Wrestling on the Pop channel.

Each winner in the round-robin matches was awarded 3 points, and a draw was worth 1 point for each participant. Each match had a 15-minute time limit. The two members of each group with the most points (out of a maximum 9 points) advanced to the final 16, where at that point the tournament switched to a single elimination format. There were only three draws: the Aries/Carter and Edwards/Richards matches which each ended in a time limit draw & the Micah/Drake match which ended in a double count out.

The winner of the tournament became the new TNA World Heavyweight Champion. The winner of the tournament was Ethan Carter III by defeating Matt Hardy in the finals by pinfall.

=== Group Play ===
The first half of the TNA World Title Series took the form of 8 smaller round-robin tournaments. Each Group featured 4 participants who met a certain criteria. All of the participants were chosen by an internal committee. While some specific reasons for nominations were revealed on air (e.g. all current title holders, apart from Bobby Roode, had automatically qualified), most reasons were not explained.

- Group Champions - Men who had previously held the TNA World Heavyweight Championship at least once.
- Group UK - Men who are from England or Scotland in the UK.
- Group Knockouts - Women who are members of the TNA Knockouts' Division.
- Group TNA Originals - Men who had been on the active roster for at least 10 years or since the company was founded in 2002.
- Group Tag Team Specialists - Men who are better known for their tag team careers rather than their singles careers.
- Group X-Division - Members of the TNA X-Division.
- Group Future 4 - An emphasis on younger talent.
- Group Wildcard - An open category.

These wrestlers qualified for the Round of 16 to become the TNA World Heavyweight Champion.
These wrestlers were mathematically eliminated from the tournament during Group Play.
The winner of the TNA World Title Series.

- Group Champions

Place	Wrestler	Points	Matches
1	Ethan Carter III	7	3
2	Lashley	6	3
3	Austin Aries	4	3
4	Mr. Anderson	0	3

- Group UK

Place	Wrestler	Points	Matches
1	Drew Galloway	9	3
2	Bram	6	3
3	Rockstar Spud	3	3
4	Grado	0	3

- Group Knockouts

Place	Wrestler	Points	Matches
1	Awesome Kong	6	3
1	Gail Kim	6	3
3	Brooke	3	3
3	Madison Rayne	3	3

- Group Wildcard

Place	Wrestler	Points	Matches
1	Mahabali Shera	9	3
2	Kenny King	6	3
3	Aiden O'Shea	3	3
4	Crazzy Steve	0	3

- Group TNA Originals

Place	Wrestler	Points	Matches
1	Bobby Roode	6	3
1	Eric Young	6	3
3	Abyss	3	3
3	James Storm	3	3

- Group Tag Team Specialists

Place	Wrestler	Points	Matches
1	Matt Hardy	9	3
2	Davey Richards	4	3
3	Robbie E	3	3
4	Eddie Edwards	1	3

- Group X Division

Place	Wrestler	Points	Matches^{1}
1	DJ Z	6	4
1	Tigre Uno	6	4
3	Manik	6	4
4	Mandrews	3	3

- Group Future 4

Place	Wrestler	Points	Matches
1	Eli Drake	7	3
2	Jessie Godderz	6	3
3	Micah	4	3
4	Crimson	0	3

^1 Group X-Division went to a three-way tie between Manik, DJ Z and Tigre Uno. A triple threat match was scheduled to determine which two would advance to the Round of 16. In this match whoever gained the first pinfall or submission would advance to the Round of 16 and would exit the match. The remaining two participants would then go one-on-one for the right to advance. DJ Z would get the first Qualifying Slot by pinning Manik and Tigre Uno would then also pin Manik to earn the other spot in the Round, thus eliminating Manik.

=== TNA World Heavyweight Championship tournament ===
The second half the TNA World Title Series took on the format of a single-elimination tournament. The first round matches were intentionally set up so that two members of the same original bracket would not face-off unless both of them managed to advance to the Semifinals Round, which happened for Group Champions' Lashley and Ethan Carter III. The first 14 matches took place on episodes of Impact. The final episode of this tournament, including the Semi-Finals and finals, took place on January 5, 2016 on the first episode of Impact Wrestling on Pop TV channel. The Round of 16 was divided into 4 groups (Group A, Group B, Group C, and Group D, etc.), although this only affected the order in which matches were held in each round.

Round of 16 (Impact Wrestling 12/2/15)
CH	Ethan Carter III	Pin
XD	DJ Z	6:13
UK	Bram	6:56
TT	Davey Richards	Pin
CH	Lashley	Pin
UK	Drew Galloway	10:39
WC	Mahabali Shera	Pin
F4	Eli Drake	3:20
XD	Tigre Uno	Pin
KO	Gail Kim	5:33
OR	Eric Young	Pin
WC	Kenny King	6:19
F4	Jessie Godderz	Pin
KO	Awesome Kong	3:12
OR	Bobby Roode	6:31
TT	Matt Hardy	Pin

Round of 8 (Impact Wrestling 12/9/15)
CH	Ethan Carter III	Pin
TT	Davey Richards	16:39
CH	Lashley	Pin
WC	Mahabali Shera	10:37
XD	Tigre Uno	12:25
OR	Eric Young	Pin
F4	Jessie Godderz	16:12
TT	Matt Hardy	Pin

Semifinals (Impact Wrestling 1/5/16)
CH	Ethan Carter III	Pin
CH	Lashley	9:09
OR	Eric Young	8:03
TT	Matt Hardy	Pin

Finals (Impact Wrestling 1/5/16)
CH	Ethan Carter III	Pin
TT	Matt Hardy	10:20

Pin-Pinfall; Sub-Submission; CO-Count out; DQ-Disqualification; DDQ-Double disqualification; DCO-Double Count out; TD-Time Limit Draw; NC-No Contest; CH-Group Champions; F4-Group Future 4; KO-Group Knockouts; OR-Group TNA Originals; TT-Group Tag Team Specialists; UK-Group UK; WC-Group Wildcard; XD-Group X Division

== Aftermath ==
The semifinals and finals were held on the January 5, 2016, live episode of Impact Wrestling, during its debut on Pop, in which Ethan Carter III defeated Lashley in the semifinals round and Matt Hardy defeated Eric Young to advance to the finals round. However, in the main event, Hardy was unable to win the TNA World Title Series tournament and therefore unable to win the vacant TNA World Heavyweight Championship as the match was ultimately won by Ethan Carter III, who became the new TNA World Heavyweight Champion for a second time. However, three days later at the Impact Wrestling tapings, Carter lost the title against Hardy in a Last Man Standing match on the January 19, 2016 episode of Impact Wrestling, ending his reign at 14 days. During the match, a double turn took place with Carter turning face for the first time in his TNA career after his bodyguard Tyrus betrayed him before Hardy turning heel.
