= Tate Twins =

The Tate Twins
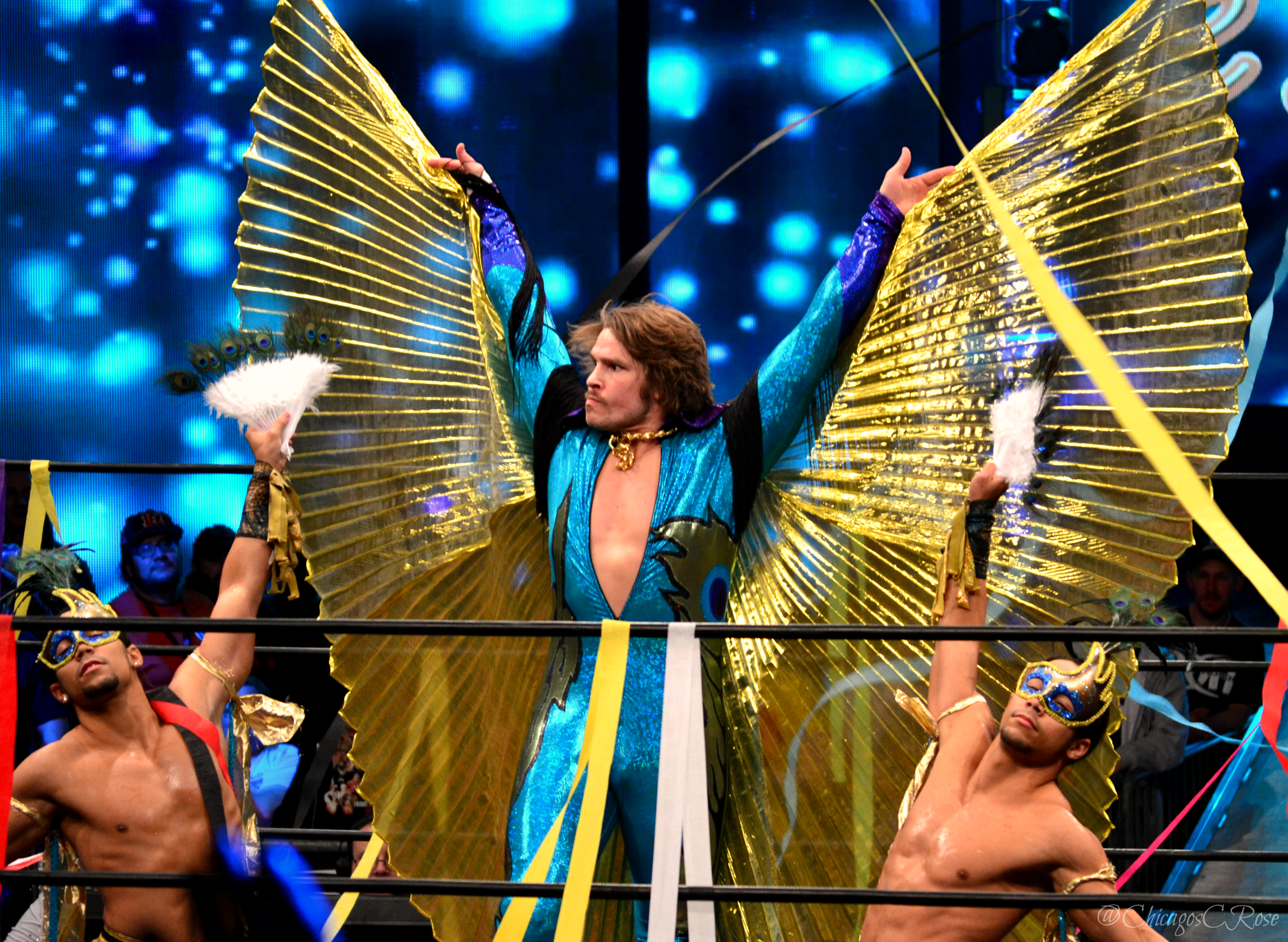
- One twin on the left, the other twin on the right

Tag team
- Members: Brent Tate/Brent Baronis/Boy #1; Brandon Tate/Brandon Baronis/Boy #2
- Name(s): Brandon and Brent Tate; Boy #1 & Boy #2; The Tate Twins; The Bad News Boyz; The Baronis Brothers; The Boys
- Billed heights: Brandon: 5 ft 6 in (1.68 m); Brent: 5 ft 6 in (1.68 m)
- Billed from: Knoxville, Tennessee
- Debut: 2010
- Disbanded: 2024
- Years active: 2010–2024

The Tate Twins were a professional wrestling tag team made up of brothers Brandon and Brent Tate. They are best known for their time at Ring of Honor (ROH) and All Elite Wrestling (AEW), where they performed as The Boys with Dalton Castle.

== History ==
=== Ohio Valley Wrestling (OVW) (2012) ===
On March 24, 2012, The Baronis Brothers made their Ohio Valley Wrestling debut in a dark match losing to the team of Raphael Constantine and Sean Casey. They continued to work various dark matches and televised matches until their final match with the promotion on June 7, 2012, in a dark match loss to the team of Jayce King and LMC.

=== Ring of Honor (ROH) (2014–2019) ===
On July 19, 2014, edition of Ring of Honor Wrestling The Tate Twins made their ROH debut taking on War Machine in a losing effort.

In 2015, The Tate Twins began going by the name The Boys joining Dalton Castle as a stable. On September 18, 2015, at All Star Extravaganza VII with the stipulations that if Castle lost, Silas Young would get services of The Boys, while if Young lost, he would become one of Castle's Boys. Castle subsequently lost the match, with Silas Young getting The Boys. Castle faced Young in another losing effort at Final Battle, but despite The Boys seemingly siding with Young in the weeks prior to the event, they rejoined Castle following the match.

On March 10, 2017, at ROH 15th Anniversary Show, The Boys and Castle unsuccessfully challenged The Kingdom for the ROH World Six-Man Tag Team Championships.

On June 23, 2017, The Boys and Dalton Castle defeated Bully Ray and The Briscoes (Jay Briscoe and Mark Briscoe) to become the ROH World Six-Man Tag Team Champions at Best in the World. On August 20, 2017, at War of the Worlds UK, The Boys and Castle lost the titles to Bullet Club's Adam Page and The Young Bucks (Matt Jackson and Nick Jackson) in Edinburgh, Scotland.

In April 2019, The Boys ended their relationship with Castle and left ROH.

=== Global Force Wrestling (2015) ===
On June 12, 2015, during the GFW Grand Slam Tour in Jackson, Tennessee, The Tate Twins made their Global Force Wrestling (GFW) debut defeating Best Friends (Chuck Taylor and Trent). The following night, they picked up another victory over the Best Friends in Knoxville, Tennessee.

=== Return to OVW (2020–2021) ===
On February 4, 2020, The Tate Twins made their return to OVW defeating the team of AJZ and Tony Bizo.

On November 7, 2020, The Tate Twins entered the 2020 Nightmare Cup Tag Team Tournament defeating three teams to win the tournament and moving onto the finals defeating The Legacy of Brutality (Ca$h Flo and Josh Ashcraft) to win the OVW Tag Team Championships.

On April 6, 2021, The Tate Twins unsuccessfully defended the OVW Tag Team Championships against the team of Jessie Godderz and Tony Gunn. They would go on to defeat Godderz and Gunn in a rematch at OVW Defiance on May 22 to regain the OVW Tag Team Championships.

On August 28, 2021, The Tate Twins lost the OVW Tag Team Championships in a six team ladder match to Darkkloudz (Deget Bundlez and Eric Darkstorm) at OVW Reckoning.

=== All Elite Wrestling / Return to ROH (2021–2024) ===
On the May 31, 2021 episode of Dark: Elevation, Brandon and Brent Tate made their All Elite Wrestling (AEW) debuts in a losing effort against The Acclaimed (Anthony Bowens and Max Caster). Brandon and Brent returned to AEW on the December 6 episode of Dark: Elevation losing to the Jurassic Express (Luchasaurus and Jungle Boy). On July 23, 2022, at Death Before Dishonor, The Boys and Dalton Castle reunited and claimed the ROH World Six-Man Tag Team Championships for the second time by defeating The Righteous (Vincent, Bateman, and Dutch) in a six man tag team match. They lost the titles at Final Battle to The Embassy, ending their reign at 140 days.

On the February 29, 2024 episode of Ring of Honor Wrestling, Johnny TV defeated Castle in a custody match for The Boys. In the following three weeks, Castle would hound Johnny TV and his wife, Taya Valkyrie, to return The Boys until Johnny TV revealed that he had (kayfabe) lost them in a bear attack on a mountain. On April 1, The Tate Twins were released from AEW and ROH.

AEW and ROH President Tony Khan revealed in a media scrum that the reason behind the release was due to the twins not showing up for work on multiple occasions. The Tate Twins disputed Khan's claims that they had not shown up for work and also claimed there had been little to no communication from the company regarding their travel arrangements. On September 5, it was reported that The Tate Twins (and Kevin Kelly) had filed a lawsuit against AEW and Khan to void the arbitration clause of their AEW talent contracts and to certify a class-action lawsuit that AEW misclassifying wrestlers as independent contractors instead of employees. On June 11, 2025, the arbitration was upheld by a federal judge in the court of law. In October 2025, the lawsuit was dismissed.

== Championships and accomplishments ==
- Next Generation Wrestling
  - NGW Tag Team Championship (1 time)
- New South Wrestling
  - New South Tag Team Championship (1 time)
- Ohio Valley Wrestling
  - OVW Tag Team Championship (2 times)
  - Nightmare Cup Tag Team Tournament (2020)
- Ring of Honor
  - ROH World Six-Man Tag Team Championship (2 times) – with Dalton Castle
