= Impact One Night Only (2019) =

Impact Wrestling's One Night Only events during 2019

One Night Only is a series of professional wrestling events held by Impact Wrestling in 2019 and streaming on their Global Wrestling Network service. It was also the final year of the One Night Only series as it would be retired and succeeded by the Impact Plus Monthly Specials, seen on GWN's own successor, Impact Plus.

== New beginnings ==
New Beginnings
- Promotion(s): Impact Wrestling; Pennsylvania Premiere Wrestling
- Date: January 26, 2019 (aired February 9, 2019)
- City: Hazleton, Pennsylvania
- Venue: Holy Family Academy

One Night Only chronology
← Previous; Back to Cali	Next → Clash in the Bluegrass

One Night Only: New Beginnings was a professional wrestling event produced by Impact Wrestling in conjunction with Pennsylvania Premiere Wrestling to be released exclusively on Global Wrestling Network.

No.	Results	Stipulations	Times
1	Fallah Bahh defeated Evander James	Singles match	7:58
2	Scarlett Bordeaux (with Jimmy Jacobs) defeated Christina Marie	Singles match	8:23
3	Desean Pratt defeated KM	Singles match	8:39
4	Sean Carr (c) defeated Cody Vance, KC Navarro, Mike Orlando (w/Allie Recks and Mr. Martinez), Sam Adams, and Tony Storm	6-Way Ladder Match for the PPW Heavyweight Championship	14:19
5	Rich Swann (c) defeated Sami Callihan	Singles match for the Impact X Division Championship	14:41
6	The Arrogance of Excellence (Clutch Adams & Johnny Moran) (w/Miranda Vionette and Ryan Race) defeated South Philly's Finest (Jimmy Konway & Luca Brazzi) (c)	Tag team match for the PPW Tag Team Championships	9:09
7	Eddie Edwards defeated Moose	Street Fight	12:36
8	Johnny Impact (c) defeated Eli Drake	Singles match for the Impact World Championship	18:26
(c) / – the champion(s) heading into the match

== Clash in the Bluegrass ==
Clash in the Bluegrass
- Promotion(s): Impact Wrestling; Ohio Valley Wrestling
- Date: March 2, 2019 (aired March 9, 2019)
- City: Louisville, Kentucky
- Venue: Davis Arena

One Night Only chronology
← Previous; New Beginnings	Next → Last

One Night Only: Clash in the Bluegrass was a professional wrestling event produced by Impact Wrestling in conjunction with Ohio Valley Wrestling to be released exclusively on Global Wrestling Network.

No.	Results	Stipulations	Times
1	Dimes defeated Sinn Bodhi	Singles match	5:21
2	Colton Cage (with Dani) defeated Brandon Espinosa	Singles match	5:26
3	Zo defeated Cash Flo, Jay Bradley, and Moose	Fatal 4-Way match	11:28
4	Madison Rayne defeated Cali Young	Singles match	7:34
5	Ohio Versus Everything (Dave Crist and Jake Crist), Madman Fulton, and Rohit Raju vs. Team OVW (Dustin Jackson, Melvin Maximus, Sam Thompson, and Shiloh Jonze) ended in a No Contest	8-man tag team match	15:56
6	Brian Cage defeated Justin Smooth	Singles match	7:33
7	Johnny Impact (c) defeated Adam Revolver (w/Shannon the Dude) and Eddie Edwards	Triple Threat match for the Impact World Championship	14:03
8	The War Kings (Crimson and Jax Dane) (c) defeated King's Ransom (Leonis Khan and Maximus Khan) and The Void (Chace Destiny and Nigel Winters)	Triple Threat match for the OVW Southern Tag Team Championship	18:33
9	Tony Gunn (with Dustin Jackson, Melvin Maximus, Sam Thompson, and Shiloh Jonze) (c) defeated Sami Callihan (with Dave Crist, Jake Crist, Madman Fulton, and Rohit Raju)	Singles match for the OVW Heavyweight Championship	28:00
(c) / – the champion(s) heading into the match
