= OVW Rush Division Championship =

Wrestling event in the Ohio Valley

Details
- Promotion: Ohio Valley Wrestling
- Date established: November 20, 2019
- Current champion: Brendan Balling
- Date won: September 3, 2026

Other names
- OVW Rush Championship; OVW Rush Division Championship (2019-present)
Statistics
- First champion: AJ Daniels
- Most reigns: Kal Herro (4 reigns)
- Longest reign: Dimes (273 days)
- Shortest reign: Brendan Balling (2nd reign, 4 days)
- Oldest champion: Hy-Zaya (39 years)
- Youngest champion: Corey Storm (18 years)
- Heaviest champion: AJ Daniels (205 lbs)

The OVW Rush Division Championship is a mid card title created and owned by the Ohio Valley Wrestling (OVW) promotion. It was announced on November 20, 2019, on OVW TV Tapings, replacing the Television title which was discarded by Tony Gunn. The RUSH Championship is sponsored by COLLARxELBOW and a brand new division was created for it. The title is currently held by Brendan Balling, in his third reign.

== Title history ==
As of September 6, 2026, there have been thirty-seven reigns between twentysecond champions with three vacancies. AJ Daniels was the inaugural champion. Kal Herro has the most reigns at four. Dimes' reign is the longest at 273 days, while Brendan Balling's second reign is the shortest at 4 days.

Key
| No. | Overall reign number |
| Reign | Reign number for the specific champion |
| Days | Number of days held |
| <1 | Reign lasted less than a day |
| + | Current reign is changing daily |

| No. | Champion | Championship change | | | Reign statistics | | Notes | Ref. |
| No. | Champion | Date | Event | Location | Reign | Days | Notes | Ref. |
|---|---|---|---|---|---|---|---|---|
| 1 | AJ Daniels | December 10, 2019 | OVW TV: Christmas Chaos | Louisville, KY | 1 | 32 | Daniels defeated D'mone Solavino, KTD, Nigel, Sam Thompson and William Lutz in a steel cage six-way ladder match to become the inaugural champion. | |
| 2 | Corey Storm | January 11, 2020 | OVW Saturday Night Special: Nightmare Rumble | Louisville, KY | 1 | 56 | This was a three-way match, also involving Hy-Zaya. | |
| 3 | Dimes | March 7, 2020 | OVW Saturday Night Special | Louisville, KY | 1 | 273 | Made Corey Storm hand over the title due to Dimes winning the 3 Wishes ladder match. | |
| 4 | William Lutz | December 5, 2020 | Christmas Chaos | Louisville, KY | 1 | 35 | This was a three-way match, also involving D'mone Solavino. | |
| 5 | Hy-Zaya | January 9, 2021 | OVW Saturday Night Special: Nightmare Rumble | Louisville, KY | 1 | 10 | Defeats previous champion William Lutz, Ace Austin, AJ Daniels, JC Addams, Rohit Raju and Star Rider in a seven-way scramble match. | |
| 6 | William Lutz | January 19, 2021 | OVW TV | Louisville, KY | 2 | 49 | | |
| 7 | Hy-Zaya | March 9, 2021 | OVW TV: Dark Match | Louisville, KY | 2 | 46 | This was a five-way match, also involving Gustavo, Koda Jacobs and Star Rider. | |
| 8 | Star Rider | April 24, 2021 | OVW Saturday Night Special: Retribution | Louisville, KY | 1 | 110 | This was a four-way match, also involving Atiba and Gustavo. | |
| 9 | Gustavo | August 12, 2021 | OVW TV | Louisville, KY | 1 | 126 | This was a three-way match, also involving Blanco Loco. | |
| 10 | Star Rider | December 16, 2021 | OVW TV: Christmas Chaos | Louisville, KY | 2 | 79 | | |
| 11 | Gustavo | March 5, 2022 | Saturday Night Special - March Mayhem | Louisville, KY | 2 | 19 | This was a Scaffold match. | |
| 12 | Hy-Zaya | March 24, 2022 | OVW TV | Louisville, KY | 3 | 93 | | |
| 13 | Luke Kurtis | June 25, 2022 | Saturday Night Special - Independence Rage | Louisville, KY | 1 | 524 | | |
| 14 | Kal Herro | December 1, 2022 | OVW TV | Louisville, KY | 1 | 93 | | |
| 15 | Blanco Loco | March 4, 2023 | OVW SNS 03/04/2023 | Louisville, KY | 1 | 103 | | |
| 16 | El Venganza | June 15, 2023 | OVW TV #1243 | Louisville, KY | 1 | 7 | Defeated Blanco Loco and Kal Herro in a three-way match. Unmasked after the match to reveal Luke Kurtis. | |
| — | Vacated | June 22, 2023 | OVW TV #1244 | Louisville, Kentucky | — | — | Al Snow announced the title was held up since technically El Venzanga was Rush Division champion, not Luke Kurtis. | |
| 17 | Kal Herro | July 6, 2023 | OVW TV #1246 | Louisville, KY | 2 | 107 | Defeated Luke Kurtis in a ladder match. | |
| 18 | Adam Revolver | October 21, 2023 | OVW No Rest for the Wicked | Louisville, KY | 1 | 13 | | |
| 19 | Kal Herro | November 3, 2023 | OVW at Manchester Music Hall | Lexington, KY | 3 | 99 | | |
| 20 | Jota Peso | February 10, 2024 | OVW Tough Love | Louisville, KY | 1 | 82 | Defeated Kal Herro, Ragnar the Ruthless, Maximo Suave, ZDP, Will Austin, and Orion in a ladder match. | |
| — | Vacated | May 2, 2024 | OVW Double Crossed | Louisville, KY | — | — | | |
| 21 | Will Austin | May 2, 2024 | OVW Double Crossed | Louisville, KY | 1 | 35 | Defeated Star Rider for the vacant title. | |
| 22 | Buzz Backlund | June 6, 2024 | OVW TV #1295 | Louisville, KY | 1 | 23 | | |
| 23 | Will Austin | June 29, 2024 | OVW Independence Rage | Louisville, KY | 2 | 63 | | |
| 24 | Jamin Olivencia | June 29, 2024 | OVW Fight Night | Pikeville, KY | 1 | 19 | This was a ladder match. | |
| 25 | Kal Herro | September 19, 2024 | OVW TV #1310 | Louisville, KY | 4 | 14 | This was a street fight. | |
| 26 | Star Rider | October 3, 2024 | OVW TV #1312 | Louisville, KY | 3 | 93 | Tony Gunn was the guest referee. | |
| 27 | Super Z | January 4, 2025 | OVW Nightmare Rumble 2025 | Louisville, KY | 1 | 131 | | |
| 28 | Obsidian Angel | May 15, 2025 | OVW TV #1344 | Louisville, KY | 1 | 7 | | |
| — | Vacated | May 22, 2025 | OVW TV #1345 | Louisville, KY | — | — | Obsidian Angel attempted to award the title to Star Rider after defeating Super Z. Due to this, OVW executives declared the title vacant. | |
| 29 | Stephen Steel | June 14, 2025 | OVW Hard Reset 2025 | Louisville, KY | 1 | 138 | | |
| 30 | Brandon Davis | October 30, 2025 | OVW TV - Hell Night 2025 | Louisville, KY | 1 | 52 | This was a Casket match. Linda Kay was the special referee. | |
| 31 | Jota Peso | December 21, 2025 | OVW Christmas Chaos 2025 | Louisville, KY | 2 | 21 | Defeated Brandon Davis, Brendan Balling, Elijah Eros, Icon Lee, JJ Lawson, Kirko Ky and Showtime Shanklin in a Gauntlet match | |
| 32 | Brendan Balling | January 11, 2026 | OVW Nightmare Rumble 2026 | Louisville, KY | 1 | 126 | Defeated Jota Peso, JJ Lawson, Elijah Eros, Jake Painter and Maximo Suave in a Scramble match | |
| 33 | JJ Lawson | May 17, 2026 | OVW Collision Course 2026 | Louisville, KY | 1 | 63 | | |
| 34 | Brendan Balling | July 19, 2026 | OVW Independence Rage 2026 | Louisville, KY | 2 | 4 | This was a TLC match. | |
| 35 | Feisty Boy Lawson | July 23, 2026 | OVW TV #1406 | Louisville, KY | 2 | 28 | | |
| 36 | Icon Lee | August 20, 2026 | OVW TV #1410 | Louisville, KY | 1 | 14 | | |
| 37 | Brendan Balling | September 3, 2026 | OVW TV #1412 | Louisville, KY | 3 | 3+ | | |

== Combined reigns ==
As of September 6, 2026.

| † | Indicates the current champion |

| Rank | Wrestler | No. of reigns | Combined days |
|---|---|---|---|
| 1 | Kal Herro | 4 | 313 |
| 2 | Star Rider | 3 | 282 |
| 3 | Dimes | 1 | 273 |
| 4 | Luke Kurtis | 1 | 252 |
| 5 | Hy-Zaya | 3 | 149 |
| 6 | Gustavo | 2 | 145 |
| 7 | Stephen Steel | 1 | 138 |
| 8 | Brendan Balling † | 3 | 133+ |
| 9 | Super Z | 1 | 131 |
| 10 | Jota Peso | 2 | 103 |
| 11 | Blanco Loco | 1 | 103 |
| 12 | Will Austin | 2 | 98 |
| 13 | JJ Lawson/Feisty Boy Lawson | 2 | 91 |
| 14 | William Lutz | 2 | 84 |
| 15 | Brandon Davis | 1 | 52 |
| 16 | AJ Daniels | 1 | 32 |
| 17 | Buzz Backlund | 1 | 23 |
| 18 | Jamin Olivencia | 1 | 19 |
| 19 | Icon Lee | 1 | 14 |
| 20 | Adam Revolver | 1 | 13 |
| 21 | El Venganza | 1 | 7 |
| 22 | Obsidian Angel | 1 | 7 |
