= List of Ohio Valley Wrestling tournaments =

Ohio Valley Wrestling has held a variety of professional wrestling tournaments competed for by wrestlers that are a part of their roster.

== Queen of OVW / Miss OVW Contest ==
The Queen of OVW / Miss OVW contest is a contest where a couple of female wrestlers in OVW (Ohio Valley Wrestling) are chosen and compete in several competitions. In the finals of the contest, the fans vote for the winner. The inaugural winner was ODB who is also the first ever OVW Women's Champion. The latest winner is Lovely Lylah who defeated Jessie Belle, Ray Lynn and Taeler Hendrix in the finals of the 2013 contest.

| Queen of OVW / Miss OVW | Date |
|---|---|
| ODB | 2007 |
| Melody | 2008 |
| Epiphany | 2009 |
| Lady JoJo | 2010 |
| C.J. Lane | 2011 |
| Taeler Hendrix | 2012 |
| Lovely Lylah | 2013 |

== Nightmare Rumble ==
=== Men's ===
| Accomplishment | Winner(s) | Date won | Event |
|---|---|---|---|
| Nightmare Rumble (2012) | Crimson | September 1, 2012 | OVW TV Taping |
| Nightmare Rumble (2014) | Johnny Spade | January 29, 2014 | OVW TV Taping |
| Nightmare Rumble (2016) | Devin Driscoll | March 5, 2016 | Saturday Night Special |
| Nightmare Rumble (2017) | Big Jon | March 4, 2017 | Saturday Night Special |
| Nightmare Rumble (2018) | Bud Dwight | January 6, 2018 | Saturday Night Special |
| Nightmare Rumble (2019) | Tony Gunn | January 5, 2019 | OVW Nightmare Rumble 2019 |
| Nightmare Rumble (2020) | Ca$h Flo | January 11, 2020 | Saturday Night Special |
| Nightmare Rumble (2021) | Omar Amir | January 9, 2021 | OVW Nightmare Rumble 2021 |
| Nightmare Rumble (2022) | Omar Amir | January 15, 2022 | OVW Nightmare Rumble 2022 |
| Nightmare Rumble (2023) | Jessie Godderz | January 7, 2023 | OVW Nightmare Rumble 2023 |
| Nightmare Rumble (2024) | Luke Kurtis | January 6, 2024 | OVW Nightmare Rumble 2024 |
| Nightmare Rumble (2025) | Doug Basham | January 4, 2025 | OVW Nightmare Rumble 2025 |
| Nightmare Rumble (2026) | Tony Evans | January 11, 2026 | OVW Nightmare Rumble 2026 |

=== Women's ===
| Accomplishment | Winner(s) | Date won | Event |
|---|---|---|---|
| Nightmare Rumble (2022) | Angelina Love | January 15, 2022 | OVW Nightmare Rumble 2022 |
| Nightmare Rumble (2023) | Haley J | January 7, 2023 | OVW Nightmare Rumble 2023 |
| Nightmare Rumble (2024) | Leila Grey | January 6, 2024 | OVW Nightmare Rumble 2024 |
| Nightmare Rumble (2025) | Haley J | January 4, 2025 | OVW Nightmare Rumble 2025 |
| Nightmare Rumble (2026) | Lovely Miss Larkan | January 11, 2026 | OVW Nightmare Rumble 2026 |

== Nightmare Cup Tag Team Tournament ==
| Accomplishment | Winner(s) | Date won | Event |
|---|---|---|---|
| Nightmare Cup Tag Team Tournament (2012) | James Thomas and Michael Hayes | August 4, 2012 | OVW Saturday Night Special |
| Nightmare Cup Tag Team Tournament (2013) | Rob Terry and Marcus Anthony | September 7, 2013 | OVW Saturday Night Special |
| Nightmare Cup Tag Team Tournament (2015) | Adam Wylde and Robbie Walker | February 7, 2015 | OVW Saturday Night Special |
| Nightmare Cup Tag Team Tournament (2019) | Corey Storm and Dimes | October 29, 2019 | OVW |
| Nightmare Cup Tag Team Tournament (2020) | The Tate Twins (Brandon Tate and Brent Tate) | November 11, 2020 | OVW Saturday Night Special |
| Nightmare Cup Tag Team Tournament (2021) | The Fanny Pack Party (Dustin Jackson and Kal Herro) | October 30, 2021 | OVW Saturday Night Special - Apocalypse |
| Nightmare Cup Tag Team Tournament (2022) | The Outrunners (Truth Magnum and Turbo Floyd) | October 29, 2022 | OVW No Rest for The Wicked |
| Nightmare Cup Tag Team Tournament (2023) | The Golden Lions (Mahabali Shera and Ca$h Flo) | October 21, 2023 | OVW No Rest for The Wicked |
| Nightmare Cup Tag Team Tournament (2025) | Anthony Toatele and Dustin Jackson | September 28, 2025 | OVW No Rest for The Wicked |

=== Nightmare Cup Tag Team Tournament (2012) ===
OVW announced a tournament to determine the number one contenders to the OVW Southern Tag Team Championship.

Teams:

- James "Moose" Thomas and Michael Hayes
- The Best Team Ever (Jessie Godderz and Rudy Switchblade)
- Bolin Services 2.0 (Jayson Wayne and Rocco Bellagio)
- Bolin Services 2.0.0 (Jack Black and Joe Coleman)
- The Mobile Homers (Adam Revolver and Ted McNaler)
- Los Ben Dejos (Ben Dejos and Marty Con Dejos)
- The Mascara Mafia (Espy and Paredyse)
- Raul LaMotta and Shiloh Jonze

Quarterfinals
Thomas/Hayes | Pin
Los Ben Dejos
Best Team Ever
Mascara Mafia * | Pin
Bolin Services 2.0.0
Bolin Services 2.0 | Pin
LaMotta/Jonze
The Mobile Homers | Pin

Semifinals
Thomas/Hayes | Pin
Best Team Ever **
Bolin Services 2.0
The Mobile Homers | Pin

Final
Thomas/Hayes | Pin
The Mobile Homers

- (*) The Mascara Mafia had to withdraw from the tournament due to injury
- (**) Replaced The Mascara Mafia

=== Nightmare Cup Tag Team Tournament (2013) ===
OVW announced a tournament to determine the number one contenders to the OVW Southern Tag Team Championship.

Teams:

- Rob Terry and Marcus Anthony
- The Best Team Ever (Jessie Godderz and Rudy Switchblade)
- The Marauders (Joe Coleman and Shiloh Jonze)
- The Mobile Homers (Adam Revolver and Ted McNaler)
- The Rockstars (Rockstar Spud and Ryan Howe)
- Michael Hayes and Mohammed Ali Vaez
- The VIP Club (Joe Rosa and Robert De Luna)
- Eddie Diamond and Timmy Danger

Quarterfinals
Terry/Anthony | Pin
Diamond/Danger
The VIP Club
Hayes/Ali Vaez | Pin
The Mobile Homers
The Marauders | Pin
The Rockstars
Best Team Ever | Pin

Semifinals
Terry/Anthony | Pin
Hayes/Ali Vaez
The Marauders
Best Team Ever | Pin

Final
Terry/Anthony | Pin
Best Team Ever

=== Nightmare Cup Tag Team Tournament (2015) ===
Danny Davis announced the tournament at an OVW TV taping.

Teams:

- Danny Davis and Trailer Park Trash
- The No Class Connection (Deonta Davis and Leon Shelly)
- Walk on the Wylde Side (Adam Wylde and Robbie Walker)
- TerreMex (Randy Terrez and The Mexicutioner)
- War Machine (Shiloh Jonze and Eric Locker)
- The Fabulous Free Bodies (The Bodybuy and Big Jon)
- The Congregation (Jade Dawson and Jake Glasure)

Quarterfinals
Davis/Trash | Pin
No Class
War Machine | Pin
The Congregation
Walker/Wylde | Pin
TerreMex
Free Bodies
Bye

Semifinals
Davis/Trash
War Machine | Pin
Walker/Wylde | Pin
Free Bodies

Final
War Machine
Walker/Wylde | Pin

=== Nightmare Cup Tag Team Tournament (2019) ===
Teams:

- Corey Storm and Dimes
- Chace Destiny and Nigel
- Dustin Jackson and Randall Floyd
- Big D and Shiloh Jonze
- The Legacy of Brutality (Ca$h Flo and Hy-Zaya)
- The Mobile Homers (Adam Revolver and Ted McNaler)
- King's Ransom (Leonis Khan and Maximus Khan)

| No. | Results | Stipulations |
|---|---|---|
| 1 | Corey Storm and Dimes defeated Chance Destiny and Nigel | Nightmare Cup Tag Team Tournament match |
| 2 | Dustin Jackson and Randall Floyd defeated Big D and Shiloh Jonze | Nightmare Cup Tag Team Tournament match |
| 3 | The Legacy of Brutality (Ca$h Flo and Hy-Zaya) defeated The Mobile Homers (Adam Revolver and Ted McNaler) | Nightmare Cup Tag Team Tournament match |
| 4 | Corey Storm and Dimes defeated The Legacy of Brutality (Ca$h Flo and Hy-Zaya), King's Ransom (Leonis Khan and Maximus Khan) and Dustin Jackson and Randall Floyd | Nightmare Cup Tag Team Tournament Final Four Way Match |

=== Nightmare Cup Tag Team Tournament (2020) ===
Teams:

- The Tate Twins (Brandon and Brent Tate)
- Atiba and Kal Herro
- Dimes and Jay Bradley
- Brother Austin and D'Mone Solavino
- Amon and Sinn Bodhi
- KTD and Omar Amir
- Dustin Jackson and Ryan Howe
- Manny Lemons and Tom Coffey

Quarterfinals
Tate Twins
Atiba/Herro
Dimes/Bradley
Austin/Solavino
Amon/Bodhi
KTD/Amir
Jackson
Lemons/Coffey

Semifinals
Tate Twins
Dimes/Bradley
Amon/Bodhi
Jackson/Howe

Final
Tate Twins
Jackson/Howe

=== Nightmare Cup Tag Team Tournament (2021) ===
Teams:

1. The Recusants/Dysfunction (Brandon Espinosa and Tom Coffey)
2. Level X (Axton Ray and Blanco Loco)
3. Southern Discomfort (Jebediah Blackhawk and Snake Williams Jr.)
4. Gustavo and Star Rider
5. Cash Flo and Dimes
6. The Box Office Blonds (Adam Swayze and Rex)
7. The Fanny Pack Party (Dustin Jackson and Kal Herro)
8. The Outrunners (Truth Magnum and Turbo Floyd)

Quarterfinals
The Recusants | Pin
Level X
Gustavo and Star Rider
Southern Discomfort | Pin
Cash Flo and Dimes | Pin
The Box Office Blonds
The Outrunners
The Fanny Pack Party | Pin

Semifinals
Dysfunction | Pin
Southern Discomfort
Cash Flo and Dimes
The Fanny Pack Party | Pin

Final
Dysfunction
The Fanny Pack Party | Pin

=== Nightmare Cup Tag Team Tournament (2022) ===
Teams:

- Adam Revolver and Omar Amir
- Anthony Catena and Tony Bizo
- Big Zo and Gnarls Garvin
- Deget Bundlez and Jared Kripke
- Dimes and Kal Herro
- Eric Darkstorm and Tony Bizo
- TW3 and Wayne Moxxi
- The Outrunners (Truth Magnum and Turbo Floyd)

Quarterfinals
The Outunners | Pin
Deget Bundlez and Jared Kripke
Dimes and Kal Herro | Pin
Eric Darkstorm and Tony Bizo
Anthony Catena and Tony Bizo | Pin
Adam Revolver and Omar Amir
TW3 and Wayne Moxxi | Pin
Big Zo and Gnarls Garvin

Semifinals
The Outunners | Pin
Dimes and Kal Herro
Anthony Catena and Tony Bizo | Pin
TW3 and Wayne Moxxi

Final
The Outunners | Pin
Anthony Catena and Tony Bizo

=== Nightmare Cup Tag Team Tournament (2023) ===
Teams:

- Manny Domingo and Star Rider
- Beaches and Cream (Lucious Lawrence and Omar Amir)
- Derby City Destroyers (Big Zo and Gnarls Garvin)
- Dysfunction (Brandon Espinosa and Kyle Roberts)
- The Fallen (D'Mone Solavino and Ronnie Roberts)
- The Golden Lions (Mahabali Shera and Ca$h Flo)
- Level X (Axton Ray and Blanco Loco)
- The Outrunners (Truth Magnum and Turbo Floyd)

Quarterfinals
Derby City Destroyers | Pin
The Fallen Manny Domingo and Star Rider | –
Beaches and Cream
Bye
Level X | Pin
The Outrunners
The Golden Lions | Pin
Dysfunction

Semifinals
Derby City Destroyers | 11:16
Beaches and Cream | Pin
Level X | 7:41
The Golden Lions | Pin

Final
Beaches and Cream | 11:45
The Golden Lions | Pin

=== Nightmare Cup Tag Team Tournament (2025) ===
This tournament was contested for the vacant OVW Tag Team Championship Teams:

- Anthony Toatele and Dustin Jackson
- Donovan Cecil and Jack Vaughn
- The Doom Syndicate (Evil Z and Icon Lee)
- Level 3 (Jay Three and Kirko Ky)
- Los Desafios (Jota Peso and Maximo Suave)
- The Trifecta (Ashton Adonis and Brandon Barretta)

First Round
Level 3 | Pin
The Doom Syndicate Donovan Cecil and Jack Vaughn | 14:32

Semifinals
Los Desafios | Pin
Level 3 | 6:09
Anthony Toatele and Dustin Jackson | Pin
The Trifecta | 17:04

Finals
Los Desafios | 13:15
Anthony Toatele and Dustin Jackson | Pin

== OVW Kentucky Heavyweight Championship Tournament (2021) ==
1st Round
1 | Luscious Lawrence | Pin
32 | William Lutz
17 | Brandon Espinoza
16 | Star Rider | Pin
9 | Jordan Kage
24 | Ca$h Flo | Pin
25 | Ben Bishop
8 | Dimes | Pin
5 | Big Rex | Pin
28 | Shannon The Dude
21 | Mahabali Shera | Pin
12 | Brent Tate
13 | Tony Gunn | Pin
20 | Shane Mercer
29 | Jake Omen
4 | Kal Herro | Pin
3 | Revereno Ronnie Roberts | Pin
30 | Tom Coffey
19 | Ryan Howe | Pin
14 | Gustavo
11 | Atiba
22 | Hy Zaya | Pin
27 | Facade
6 | Dustin Jackson | Pin
7 | Koda Jacobs
26 | Superior Tony Evans | Pin
23 | Chris Michaels
10 | Tony Bizo | Pin
15 | Drew Hernandez | Pin
18 | D'Mone Solavino
31 | Brandon Tate | Pin
2 | Heath Hatton

2nd Round
Luscious Lawrence | Pin
Star Rider
Ca$h Flo | Pin
Dimes
Shannon The Dude
Mahabali Shera | Pin
Tony Gunn | Pin
Kal Herro
Revereno Ronnie Roberts | Pin
Ryan Howe
Hy Zaya | Pin
Dustin Jackson
Superior Tony Evans
Tony Bizo | Pin
Drew Hernandez | Pin
Brandon Tate

Quarterfinals
Luscious Lawrence
Ca$h Flo | Pin
Mahabali Shera | Pin
Tony Gunn
Revereno Ronnie Roberts | Pin
Hy Zaya
Tony Bizo | Pin
Drew Hernandez

Semifinals
Ca$h Flo
Luscious Lawrence | Pin
Revereno Ronnie Roberts
Tony Bizo | Pin

Finals
Luscious Lawrence | Pin
Tony Bizo

== See also ==
- Professional wrestling tournament
