= Ohio Valley Wrestling =

American professional wrestling promotion

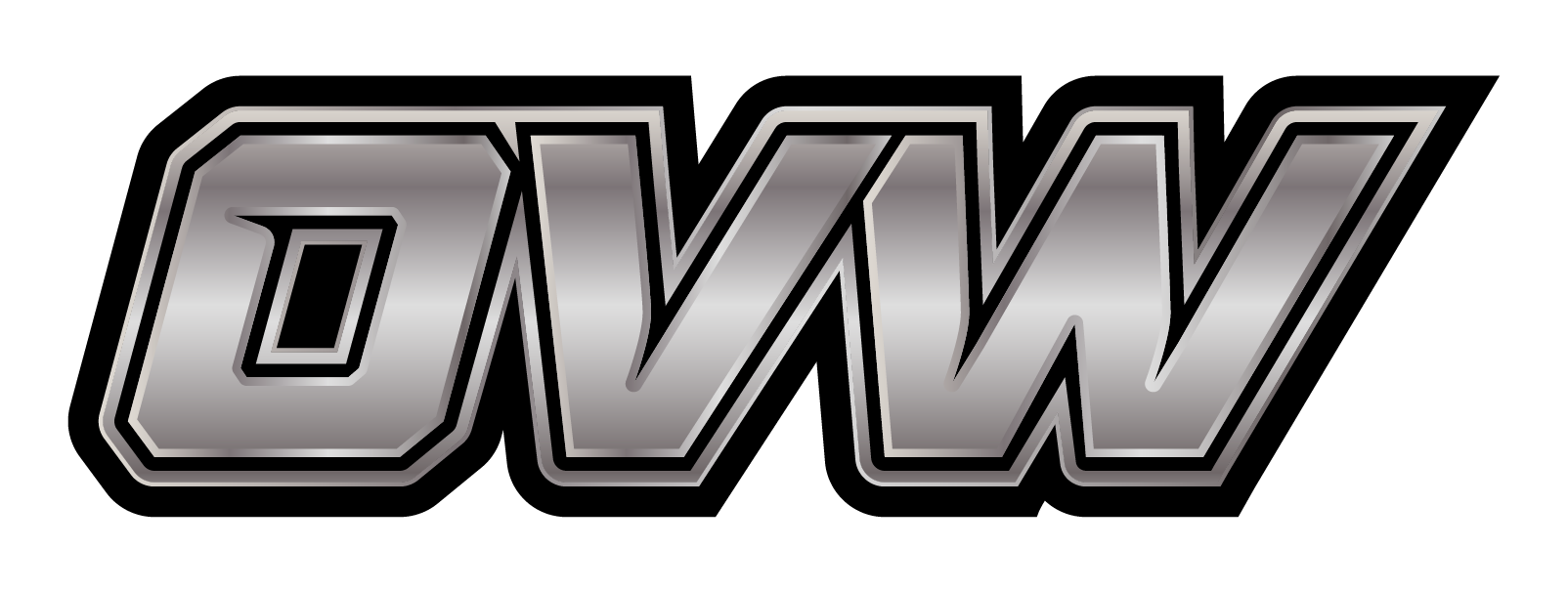
- Industry: Professional wrestling
- Founded: 1993; 33 years ago
- Founder: Nightmare Danny Davis
- Headquarters: 4400 Shepherdsville Rd, Louisville, Kentucky, United States
- Owners: Morley Sports Management; Rob Edwards; Craig Greenberg; Matt Jones
- Website: ovwrestling.com

Ohio Valley Wrestling
- Created by: "Nightmare" Danny Davis
- Original language: English
- No. of seasons: 25
- No. of episodes: 1,396

Production
- Camera setup: Multicamera setup
- Running time: 105 minutes

Original release
- Network: WBNA-21; Triller TV; YTA; YouTube; Action Sports
- Release: January 17, 1998 – present

Ohio Valley Wrestling (OVW) is an American professional wrestling promotion and former developmental territory based in Louisville, Kentucky. The company is currently owned and operated by Morley Sports Management, a United Kingdom-based sports consulting firm.

OVW was initially a member promotion of the National Wrestling Alliance (NWA) from its inception in 1993 until 2000, when it became the primary developmental territory for the World Wrestling Federation, now known as WWE. It remained in this role from 2000 until February 7, 2008, when the promotion became unaffiliated. In November 2011, OVW became the developmental territory for Total Nonstop Action Wrestling. This relationship initially ended on November 2, 2013, but on March 19, 2019, the two promotions re-established their developmental agreement.

OVW's television programming originates from the Hotpoint Davis Arena in the Buechel neighborhood of Louisville. Their weekly series (branded on-air as OVW Rise since January 2024, and known informally as OVW TV) currently airs live on local station WBNA-21, streaming service Triller TV, and the promotion's YouTube channel. As of 2020, through various syndication and distribution deals, OVW's weekly series is available to view in over 100 million households in the U.S., and to over 700 million worldwide.

== History ==
=== Founding and NWA membership (1993–2001) ===
OVW was founded by Nightmare Danny Davis in 1993 as a National Wrestling Alliance (NWA) member promotion under the name NWA Ohio Valley Championship Wrestling. The company primarily ran shows in the Kentucky and Indiana territories that were formerly run by the United States Wrestling Association, with weekly shows run out of the original Davis Arena in Jeffersonville, Indiana, with larger shows run out of the Louisville Gardens in Louisville, Kentucky.

In 1997, OVW ended its relationship with the NWA and renamed itself Ohio Valley Wrestling. Later that year, Trailer Park Trash became the first OVW Heavyweight Champion by defeating Vic the Bruiser.

On January 16, 1998, OVW taped the first episode of its weekly television series, emanating from the original Davis Arena in Jeffersonville, Indiana. Louisville Gardens ring announcer Dean Hill served as play by play commentator alongside Faye Davis as the Ring Announcer. The show featured an introduction to the company by owner Danny Davis, with a main event of Nick Dinsmore and Rob Conway vs Juan Hurtado and The Assassin #2.

=== WWF/WWE developmental territory (1999–2008) ===
In 1999, WWF creative team member Jim Cornette bought a stake in OVW, with OVW becoming a WWF developmental territory. Cornette, taking on the role of booker and show writer while appearing in an on-camera commentator role, made his first televised appearance on July 10, 1999, and spoke of the changes that were to take place. The first group of developmental talent included future stars such as John Cena, Randy Orton, Brock Lesnar, Batista, and Shelton Benjamin.

OVW held its final show at the original Davis Arena on August 21, 2002, headlined by a match between Damaja and René Duprée. On September 4, 2002, the company would debut its show at the current Davis Arena at 4400 Shepherdsville Rd in Louisville, Kentucky. On July 10, 2005, Jim Cornette parted ways with WWE and was relieved of his duties overseeing OVW. This resulted from an incident where Cornette reportedly slapped an OVW beginners class student Anthony Carelli (better known as Santino Marella) for having an inappropriate reaction to being confronted by a horror-themed wrestler called The Boogeyman during a match at an OVW television taping. The two have not been on positive terms since, even having a confrontation during an event both were performing at as recently as October 2017. Cornette was replaced by WWE Trainer Al Snow on the announce team, and Snow was replaced as creative director/producer by Paul Heyman. This arrangement would be short-lived, however, as WWE would eventually put Heyman in charge of the revival of ECW as a WWE brand. Eventually the booking duties would go to Al Snow, who would have the longest tenure outside of Cornette. Jim Cornette sold his stake in OVW to Davis in 2007.

In 2007, WWE launched Florida Championship Wrestling (FCW) in Tampa, Florida to serve as a new developmental territory. OVW and FCW simultaneously trained WWE prospects for a brief period, but on February 7, 2008, WWE announced that it had ended its relationship with OVW, moving all contracted talent to FCW. WWE-contracted talent also made occasional appearances on OVW shows, including a match between John Cena and Lance Cade as the main event for the final Kentucky Kingdom show. However, FCW was dissolved in 2012 and was relaunched as NXT, formerly a reality/scripted television program that existed in its format from 2010 to 2012, replacing the ECW brand.

=== Post-WWE years (2008–2018) ===
In 2009, OVW alumnus John "Bradshaw" Layfield would leave WWE to sponsor OVW. On September 8, 2010, in what was dubbed the company's "season premiere", Danny Davis, who himself was making his return for the first time in over a year, announced that Jim Cornette was returning to his role as match maker of the company. Cornette, who was also executive producer of Ring of Honor's HDNet show, Ring of Honor Wrestling, announced that ROH talent were going to work in OVW, along with other new and returning OVW members of the roster.

Logo used in the 2010s

On November 7, 2011, it was announced that OVW and TNA Wrestling had reached an agreement for the former to become an official training and developmental territory. This agreement would end on November 2, 2013, due to a financial dispute.

=== Gladiator Sports and Al Snow era (2018–2021) ===
On April 6, 2018, it was announced that professional wrestler Al Snow was purchasing the promotion from Danny Davis, who was planning to retire but didn't want to shut the company down. On September 12, 2018, it was announced that Ohio Valley Wrestling would be merging with Top Notch Boxing, a major boxing promotion in Louisville, to form the Gladiator Sports Network. OVW's first event under the Gladiator Sports banner was the 1000th episode special of its television series on October 10, 2018, from Louisville's Fourth Street Live!. This was OVW's first ever live televised event and it was streamed on FITE TV. The event featured a tournament for the vacant OVW championship featuring both current and past stars as well as a tribute to the company's founders.

On October 29, 2018, the brand announced an international expansion of its wrestling school and television product to the European Market labeled OVW-EU. Most of the schools now affiliated with the OVW Brand outside the United States were formally with the "Al Snow Wrestling Academy" brand which was merged with OVW upon the purchase by Gladiator Sports. This expands Ohio Valley Wrestling to a total of 17 wrestling schools worldwide. An on-demand service, which will air past and current editions of the original American brand plus the possibility of a future OVW UK Brand, was also announced. The service would officially launch on the third week of March 2019 at a cost of $4.99 a month.

In February 2019, OVW would announce a partnership with Impact Wrestling to produce an exclusive event for Impact's Global Wrestling Network (GWN). The event, titled Clash in the Bluegrass, would be an Impact One Night Only special held on March 2, 2019, in Davis Arena. The full-length event would stream on GWN on March 9, 2019. Clash in the Bluegrass would mark the first collaboration between OVW and Impact since 2013, and would be the first time the new Davis Arena has ever sold out an event via pre-sale tickets. On March 19, 2019, Impact announced that the company had entered a new partnership with OVW as its developmental territory.

In April 2019, local media in Louisville reported that OVW was developing a formal vocational educational program in professional wrestling through the Al Snow Wrestling Academy, and had applied for accreditation with the Kentucky Department of Education. The school would be approved by the state of Kentucky on September 15, making it the first officially accredited professional wrestling trade school.

During the August 8, 2019, TV tapings, it was announced that OVW TV would move to Tuesday nights on WBNA starting October 1, and that the show would air live.

In October 2020, OVW announced a partnership with Qatar Pro Wrestling. That same month, Game+, a Canadian channel owned by Impact's parent company, Anthem Sports & Entertainment, began syndicating OVW's television program in Canada and the United States.

=== 2021–present ===
On January 5, 2021, OVW announced that Matt Jones of Kentucky Sports Radio and Craig Greenberg of 21c Museum Hotels were lead investors in a group that purchased a majority interest in the company. Snow continues to run the promotion's day-to-day operations. Later that year, Louisville TV station WDRB reported that OVW was preparing to move into a building in the city's St. Joseph neighborhood that had served as a University of Louisville employee fitness center before being closed in 2019. If zoning approval is obtained, both OVW and the Al Snow Wrestling Academy will operate out of that facility.

It was announced on August 21, 2023, that OVW would be featured in a new docuseries to air on Netflix titled, Wrestlers. The show follows the company throughout their journey and climb back to prominence. The series comes from director Greg Whiteley (Last Chance U, Cheer) and BBC Studios Los Angeles and covers Al Snow's attempt to keep the promotion economically viable. The success of the show led to OVW to enter a strategic partnership with Genvec Ventures that would ensure them a financial stability. In addition, Ed Payer was named the new CEO of the company.

On January 11, 2024, OVW announced that Mickie James has joined OVW as Creative Director, Head of Female Talent and Executive Producer of their wrestling shows.

On April 7, 2025, Matt Jones announced that Morley Sports Management, a United Kingdom-based sports consulting firm and owners of Haverfordwest County, had acquired a majority shareholding stake of Ohio Valley Wrestling. The acquisition took effect on May 1, 2025, with Rob Edwards, founder of Morley Sports Management, becoming CEO of OVW. Jones, Louisville mayor Craig Greenberg, Andrew Jefferson, Jeffrey Tuvlin, and Al Snow remained with the company as advisors and minority owners.

== Championships ==
=== Current champions ===
As of November 4, 2026.

Championship	Current champion(s)	Reign	Date won	Days held	Location	Notes	Ref.
OVW Heavyweight Championship	Dustin Jackson	2	July 19, 2026	108+	Louisville, Kentucky	Defeated Jay DeNiro at Independence Rage.	
OVW United States Championship	Dustin Jackson	2	October 29, 2026	6+	Louisville, Kentucky	Defeated Brendan Balling in a Ladder Match at OVW TV.	
OVW Media Championship	Dustin Jackson	3	October 18, 2026	17+	Louisville, Kentucky	Defeated Meto at OVW Hell Night 2026.	
OVW Rush Division Championship	Tommy Boy	1	October 18, 2026	17+	Louisville, Kentucky	Defeated Jay Three for the Vacant Rush Division Championship at OVW Hell Night 2026.	
OVW Tag Team Championship	Damn OGs (Adam Revolver and Tony Gunn)	1 (11, 4)	August 15, 2026	81+	Cincinnati, OH	Defeated then-champions Only Bros (Boy Toy Troy and Star Player Prime) at Race for the Crown.	
OVW Women's Championship	J-Rod	3	October 18, 2026	17+	Louisville, Kentucky	Defeated Dayami at OVW Hell Night 2026.	

=== Defunct championships ===
Championship	Years active	First champion(s)	Final champion(s)	Notes
OVW National Heavyweight Championship	2020–2025	Jessie Godderz	Erik Surge	On May 8, 2025, at OVW TV #1343, OVW executive Al Snow presented Surge with the OVW United States Heavyweight title, replacing the National Heavyweight title.
OVW Light Heavyweight Championship	1999–2001	Jason Lee	Chris Michaels	
OVW Hardcore Championship	2000–2001	Trailer Park Trash	Randy Orton	
OVW Television Championship	2005–2019	Brent Albright	AJZ	On October 30, Tony Gunn threw the Television Championship into the Ohio River. OVW Commissioner Dean Hill announced on OVW TV that because of this, the Television Championship was deactivated.
OVW Kentucky Heavyweight Championship	2020–2024	Luscious Lawrence	Kal Herro	At the February 15, 2024 OVW Rise event, Mick Foley presented Herro with the Ohio Valley Wrestling Media title, replacing the Kentucky Heavyweight title.

== Roster ==
=== Men's division ===
Ring name	Real name	Notes
Anthony Toatele	Anthony Toatele	
Ashton Adonis	Unknown	
Big Zo	Cowann Owens	OVW United States Champion
Boy Toy Troy	Unknown	
Brandon Barretta	Brandon Smith	
Brandon Davis		OVW Rush Division Champion
Brandon Espinosa	Brandon Espinosa	
Ca$h Flo	Mike Walden	
Chris Exodus	Unknown	
Crixus	Luke Scoular	
Donovan Cecil	Unknown	OVW Tag Team Champion
Drew Hernandez	Drew Hernandez	
Dustin Jackson	Dustin Jackson	
Elijah Drago	Unknown	
Elijah Eros	Unknown	
Erik Surge	Vernon Willis Jr.	
Evil Z	Unknown	
Icon Lee	Unknown	
Jack Vaughn	Unknown	OVW Tag Team Champion
Jake Lawless	Unknown	OVW Media Champion
Jake Painter	Jake Painter	
JJ Lawson	Unknown	
Jotá Peso	Luis Garcia	
Justice Davis	Unknown	
Kal Herro	Unknown	OVW Heavyweight Champion
Kash Daniel	Kash Daniel	
Kid Colossus	Unknown	
Leo Fox	Unknown	
Luscious Lawrence	Lawrence Key Jr.	
Mad Dog Martin	Jacob Martin	
Maximo Suave	Unknown	
The Obsidian Angel	Unknown	
Star Player Prime Jackson	Unknown	
Showtime Shanklin	Unknown	
Star Rider	Unknown	
Stephen Steele	Stephen Dumeyer Jr.	
Thomas Heim	Thomas Heim	
Tony Evans	Tony Frank	
Tony Gunn	Anthony Gunn	Producer
TW3	Thomas Sinkfield	

=== Women's division ===
Ring name	Real name	Notes
Dayami	Unknown	
Freya the Slaya	Sarah States	
Hollyhood Haley J	Haley James	
J-Rod	Jessica Roden	
Janie Hartman	Unknown	
Karter Cauffman	Karter Cauffman	
Leela Feist	Unknown	OVW Women's Champion
Leila Grey	Catherine Guzman	
Lovely Miss Larkan	Larkan Danielle	
Madi the American Badi	Madison Owens	
Noelle	Unknown	
Rachel Ley	Rachel Ley	
Sophia Rose	Sophia Gedgaudas	
Teagan Thorne	Unknown	

=== Broadcast team ===
Ring name	Real name	Role
AJ McKay	AJ McKay	Play-by-Play Commentator for OVW Rise; Producer
Carmen Michael	Carmen Childers	Play-by-Play Commentator for OVW Overdrive
Eric Cornish	Eric Cornish	Ring Announcer for OVW Rise; Color Commentator for OVW Overdrive
Josh Ashcraft	Josh Ashcraft	Color Commentator for OVW Rise
Linda Kay	Linda Kay	Color Commentator for OVW Rise; Ring Announcer for OVW Overdrive

=== Referees ===
Ring name	Real name	Role
Charlene McKenzie	Charlene McKenzie	Referee
Dallas Edwards	Dallas Edwards	Referee
Daniel Spencer	Daniel Spencer	Senior Referee
Jake Cloyd	Jake Cloyd	Referee
Shane Chess	Shane Chess	Referee
Steven Eveslage	Steven Eveslage	Referee

=== Producers ===
Ring name	Real name	Role
Jesse Morris	Jesse Morris	Producer
Maria James	Maria James	Producer
Jebediah Blackhawk		Producer/Agent
Doug Basham		Producer/Agent

=== OVW Academy ===
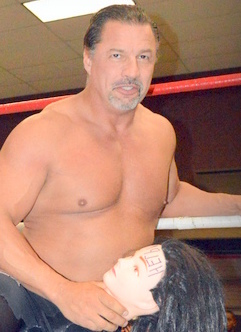
Al Snow

Ring name	Real name	Role
Adam Revolver	Jared Pridgin	Television Show Writing and Formatting; Producer; Occasional Wrestler
Al Snow	Allen Sarven	Minority Owner; Head Trainer
Becky Cady	Becky Cady	Executive Administrator
Bryan Roof	Bryan Roof	Admissions Director; Production and Digital Media
Doug Basham	Lyle Basham Jr.	Trainer; Occasional Wrestler
Jay DeNiro	Shane Hedrick	Trainer; Occasional Wrestler
Josh Patterson	Josh Patterson	Basic English for Professional Wrestling
KarDaniel Dunn	KarDaniel Dunn	Sports Performance and Nutrition
Kharn Alexander	Kharn Alexander	On-Camera Presentation
Mike Bucci	Mike Bucci	Financial Management

=== Management ===
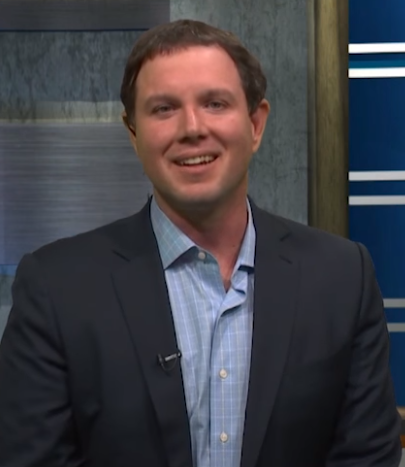
Matt Jones

Ring name	Real name	Role
Andrew Jefferson	Andrew Jefferson	Minority Owner
Craig Greenberg	Craig Greenberg	Minority Owner
Jeffrey Tuvlin	Jeffrey Tuvlin	Minority Owner
Matt Jones	Matt Jones	Minority Owner
"Nightmare" Danny Davis	Daniel Briley	Founder
Rob Edwards	Rob Edwards	Chief Executive Officer; Majority Owner
Tracy Rosensteel	Tracy Rosensteel	Chief Strategy Officer

== Notable alumni ==
- Aaron Aguilera/Jesús
- Abyss
- Alicia Fox
- Antonio Thomas
- Ariel
- Armando Estrada
- Aron Stevens
- Bam Neely
- Batista
- Beth Phoenix
- Big Show
- Bobby Lashley
- The Boogeyman
- Bradshaw
- Brent Albright/Gunner Scott
- Brian Pillman Jr.
- Brock Lesnar
- Bull Buchanan
- Carlito
- Chad Toland
- Charlie Haas
- Chris Cage
- Chris Kanyon
- Chris Masters
- Christopher Nowinski
- CM Punk
- Cody Rhodes
- Colt Cabana
- Crash Holly
- Crazzy Steve
- Crimson
- Cryme Tyme
- Curt Hawkins/Brian Myers
- Daffney
- Damaja/Danny Basham
- Daniel Puder
- Daniel Rodimer/Dan Rodman
- Davey Boy Smith Jr.
- Deuce 'n' Domino
- Dexter Lumis
- DJ Gabriel
- Doug Basham
- Drake Maverick
- Elijah Burke/D'Angelo Dinero
- EC3
- Eve Torres
- Faarooq
- Flash Flanagan
- Frankie Kazarian
- Gail Kim
- Gene Snitsky
- The Highlanders
- Jackie Gayda/Miss Jackie
- Jake Hager
- Jamie Noble
- Jamin Olivencia
- Jay Bradley/Ryan Braddock
- Jazz
- Jillian Hall
- Joey Mercury
- John Cena
- Johnny Nitro/John Morrison
- Johnny Jeter
- Johnny Swinger
- Jon Heidenreich
- K.C. James
- Katie Lea
- Kelly Kelly
- Ken Doane/Kenny
- Kenzo Suzuki
- Kevin Thorn/Seven
- Kid Kash
- Kizarny
- Kofi Kingston
- Lance Cade
- Lei'D Tapa
- Linda Miles
- Luke Gallows/Festus
- Luther Reigns
- Madison Rayne
- Marc Copani/Muhammad Hassan
- Mark Henry
- Mark Jindrak
- Maryse Ouellet
- Matt Cappotelli
- Matt Morgan
- Matt Sydal
- Megan Bayne
- Melina Perez
- Melissa Coates
- Mike Mondo/Mikey
- The Miz
- Mr. Kennedy/Mr. Anderson
- Natalya
- Nathan Jones
- Nick Dinsmore/Eugene
- Nick Mitchell/Mitch
- Nick Nemeth/Nicky/Dolph Ziggler
- Nidia
- ODB
- Orlando Jordan
- Pat Buck
- Paul Burchill
- Randy Orton
- Ray Gordy/Jesse
- Rebel
- René Duprée
- Rhyno
- Ricky Ortiz
- Rico Constantino
- Roadkill
- Rob Conway
- Rob Terry
- Rodney Mack
- Romeo Roselli
- Ron "H2O" Waterman
- Rosa Mendes
- Ruby Riott/Ruby Soho
- Ryback
- Santino Marella
- Sean O'Haire
- Sean Patrick O'Brien
- Serena Deeb
- The Shane Twins/The Gymnini
- Sharmell
- Shawn Daivari
- Shawn Spears
- Shelton Benjamin
- Simon Dean/Nova
- Sojourner Bolt
- Solo Darling
- Steve Bradley
- Sylvain Grenier
- Sylvester Terkay
- Taeler Hendrix
- Tank Toland
- Taryn Terrell
- The Tate Twins
- Tommaso Ciampa
- Tommy Dreamer
- Trevor Murdoch
- Tyson Tomko
- Victoria
- Vito
- Vladimir Kozlov
- Wade Barrett
- Zack Ryder/Matt Cardona

== See also ==
- List of Ohio Valley Wrestling tournaments
- Sports in Louisville, Kentucky
- List of National Wrestling Alliance territories
- List of independent wrestling promotions in the United States
