= Wrestlers (TV series) =

Documentary television series

- Directed by: Greg Whiteley
- Music by: Zach Robinson
- Country of origin: United States
- Original language: English
- No. of seasons: 1
- No. of episodes: 7

Production
- Executive producers: Ryan O'Dowd; Greg Whiteley
- Production companies: One Potato Productions; BBC Studios

Original release
- Network: Netflix
- Release: September 13, 2023

Wrestlers is a television documentary series broadcast by Netflix that follows Al Snow and the Ohio Valley Wrestling (OVW) promotion. The series debuted on September 13, 2023 and has received positive reviews.

== Episodes ==
Overview of Wrestlers, season 1 episodes
No.	Title	Original release date
1	"Ohio Valley Wrestling"	September 13, 2023
Al Snow has run the struggling Ohio Valley Wrestling promotion for years and after coming close to financial collapse, two outside investors came in to save it.
2	"Cheap Heat"	September 13, 2023
Al and investor Matt Jones have different visions of how to make money with OVW: Matt wants to emphasize a live tour in the summer and Al prefers the weekly television program leading to live pay-per-view (PPV) events. The tour starts and a new PPV event fails to bring in anywhere near enough money. Al talks about his career as a wrestler.
3	"Faces & Heels"	September 13, 2023
The tour continues in the Ohio Valley region and one of the wrestlers gets arrested for drug use. Matt's management style causes conflict with the talent and while he discusses it with some of the other higher-ups in OVW, he has a seizure.
4	"Get Over"	September 13, 2023
Matt establishes a relationship between OVW and the much larger promotion All Elite Wrestling and Al pursues bringing in James Storm for a match to defeat champion Mahabali Shera, even though he is expensive. Second-generation wrestler Hollyhood Haley J has charisma and is given an opportunity to fight on a nationally televised Women of Wrestling event with her mother The Amazing Maria, but that interferes with Al's OVW storylines.
5	"Mother"	September 13, 2023
Haley works through the intense trauma of her childhood by having a deathmatch with her mother and she also experiences tension with her boyfriend Eric Darkstorm who is several years Haley's senior and has been wrestling for decades, but has yet to experience the fame that Haley has in her short career.
6	"About Face"	September 13, 2023
The summer tour wraps up successfully and in the lead-up to a pivotal PPV event, Haley gets another WOW job and will be gone for multiple shows. Shera has dislocated his shoulder and will also miss many matches. Matt encourages Al to wrestle, against his better judgement, due to being retired from being in the ring and in pain. Before she heads out, Haley has a blow-up with Eric and the two break up.
7	"The Big One"	September 13, 2023
In the lead up to The Big One PPV, Al agrees to wrestle and Haley has gone off to the WOW event in Los Angeles, where she anticipates missing OVW's event. Haley manages to make the event and the crowd is enthusiastic. Al's match goes well and the OVW roster go out to celebrate, where Eric and Haley reconcile.

== Critical reception ==
Review aggregator Rotten Tomatoes scores season one 100%, based on six reviews. Sean T. Collins of Decider recommended that readers stream the series for giving "a largely unvarnished glimpse into a place both wonderful and strange". Alfred Konuwa of Forbes.com stated that the series perfectly captures the wrestling world by showing the personal lives of the superstars and the difficult finances behind running the business. Allison Herman of Variety called the first season a "(body) slam dunk" for causing the audience to become emotionally invested, writing that "we take Al at his word when he says what’s best for his employees is what’s best for OVW, even when they leave the roster for other promotions, and why we worry just a bit about what a mass audience may mean for the group". In The Wall Street Journal, John Anderson called this series a "low-rent, high-art drama" and summed up that the series was possibly too lengthy, but the show "requires enough narrative content to make a journey from enmity to empathy".

The series was nominated for Best New Non-Scripted Or Documentary Series at the 2024 Film Independent Spirit Awards, losing to Dear Mama.

== See also ==
- 2023 in professional wrestling
- Cheer
- Last Chance U
