= Hotpoint Davis Arena =

Professional wrestling arena in Louisville, Kentucky

- Interactive map of Hotpoint Davis Arena
- Former names: Davis Arena
- Location: 4400 Shepherdsville Rd, Louisville, Kentucky 48375; United States
- Coordinates: 38.184780°N 85.661170°W
- Owner: Ohio Valley Wrestling
- Capacity: 350-400

Construction
- Opened: September 4, 2002
- Renovated: 2024

Tenant
- Ohio Valley Wrestling (2002-present)

Website
- https://ovwrestling.com/

Hotpoint Davis Arena, formerly known as Davis Arena, is an arena located in Louisville, Kentucky and is primarily used for professional wrestling. The arena is home to Ohio Valley Wrestling's television programming and acts as a school and training center to develop future wrestlers.

The arena opened on September 4, 2002, after Ohio Valley Wrestling moved their operations from the original Davis Arena a month prior.

From 2010 to 2011, Ring of Honor held tapings for its weekly television show at the arena.

In 2020, the Louisville-based band Drunk & Sailor would perform an empty arena concert to help raise funds for donations to help support both the band and the Ohio Valley Wrestling promotion.

In July 2024, the arena was closed for upgrades and renovations which also included the addition of air conditioning to the facility. The arena would later reopen on August 29, 2024, with Hotpoint, a California-based appliance manufacturer, getting the naming rights for the venue.
