= LNHS =

LNHS may refer to:

- Labogon National High School, Mandaue City, Cebu, Philippines
- Lake Norman High School, Mooresville, North Carolina, United States
- Lakeville North High School, Lakeville, Minnesota, United States
- Lawrence North High School, Indianapolis, Indiana, United States
- Liberty North High School, Liberty, Missouri, United States
- Liloy National High School, Liloy, Zamboanga del Norte, Philippines
- Loy Norrix High School, Kalamazoo, Michigan, United States
