= Lucky Cannon =

American professional wrestler

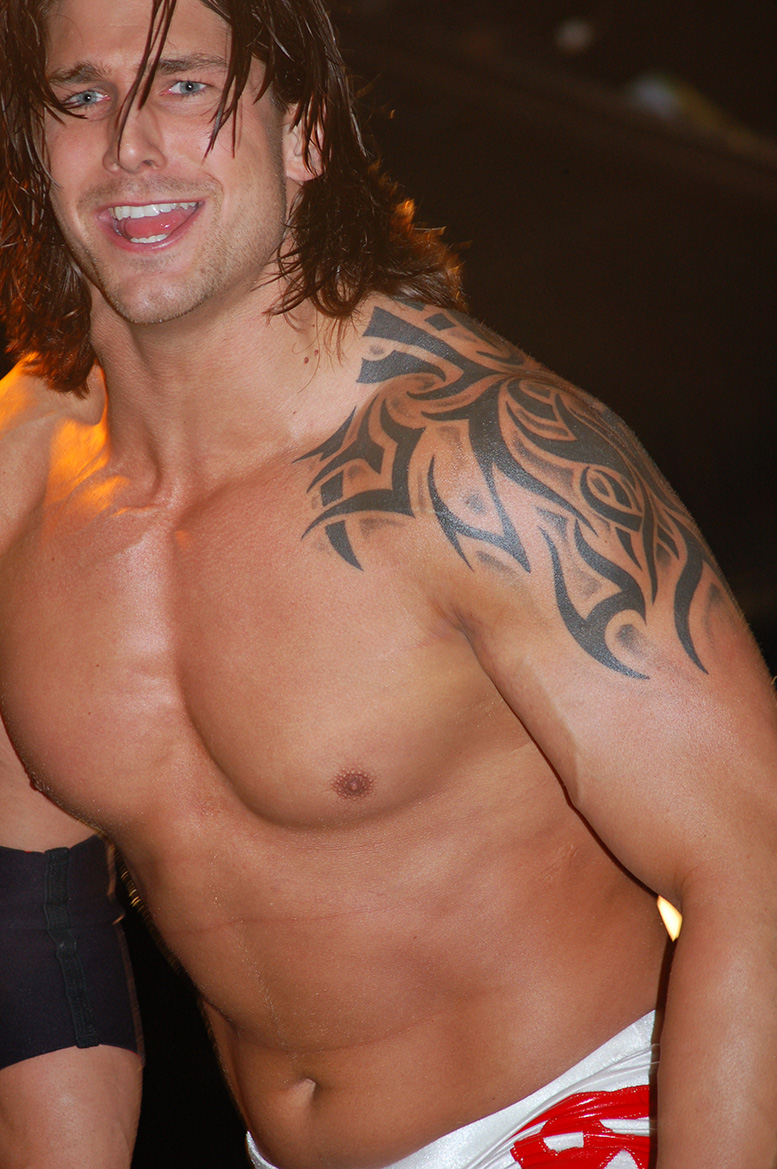
- Cannon at an FCW event in 2010

Personal information
- Born: Jonathon David Emminger; November 8, 1983 (age 42) New Iberia, Louisiana, U.S.
- Spouse: Christine Emminger
- Children: 2

Professional wrestling career
- Ring name(s): Jason Cannon; Johnny Prime; Jon Emminger; Lucky Cannon; Johnny Emminger
- Billed height: 6 ft 5 in (1.96 m)
- Billed weight: 257 lb (117 kg)
- Billed from: New Port Richey, Florida
- Trained by: Florida Championship Wrestling
- Debut: 2008
- Retired: November 2011

Jonathon David Emminger (born November 8, 1983) is an American retired professional wrestler, better known by his ring names Johnny Prime and Lucky Cannon. He is best known for his appearances for WWE, where he performed on the second and fifth seasons of NXT, while also working in the promotion's developmental territory Florida Championship Wrestling (FCW), where he held the FCW Florida Heavyweight Championship.

== Early life ==
Emminger played football as a quarterback in high school for Ridgewood High School in New Port Richey, Florida.

Some pro wrestling sources claim that Emminger played in the Arena Football League and the St. Louis Rams, but no online football databases or newspaper articles prove that Emminger played football at any level outside of high school.

During Season 2 of NXT, Cannon claimed in 2004, that he was struck in back of the head with a pipe and was in a coma for 3 weeks.

In early 2011, Cannon was arrested for impersonating a police officer and was released on bail. According to Cannon, the charges were later dropped.

== Professional wrestling career ==
=== World Wrestling Entertainment/WWE ===
==== Florida Championship Wrestling (2008–2011) ====
In 2008, Emminger signed a contract with World Wrestling Entertainment (WWE), and was assigned to Florida Championship Wrestling (FCW), the company's developmental territory. On July 12, 2008, Emminger began wrestling as Johnny Prime, and teamed with Lupe Martinez in a loss to Sinn Bowdee and Jack Gabriel. He wrestled mainly in tag team matches, and met with some success the following month, when he teamed with Kafu to defeat Jack Gabriel and Ian Richardson, and with Imani Lee to defeat Tyrone Jones and Vic Adams. He also competed in mixed tag team matches, teaming up with Tiffany to gain a victory at the expense of Stu Bennett and Alicia Fox in September. He then forayed into singles match, competing against Caleb O'Neil, TJ Wilson, Gavin Spears, and Mike Kruel. In late 2008, he entered a feud with Byron Saxton and his stable, the Saxton Conglomerate, and faced the members of the Conglomerate in several matches. During the course of this feud Kaleb O'Neal began teaming with Prime in order to help him out, however, O'Neal later turned on Prime and joined the Conglomerate.

In early 2009, Prime entered into several one-off tag teams. He teamed with Scotty Goldman to defeat Kaleb O'Neal and Lawrence Knight, and with Joe Hennig to defeat The Dudebusters (Trent Barreta and Caylen Croft). In March, April, and May, he feuded with Alex Riley, losing to him in a singles match at the March 13 television tapings. He gained a measure of revenge on March 26, when he teamed with Johnny Curtis and Tyler Reks to defeat Riley, Mr. Tarver and Ian Richardson in a six-man tag team match. The following month, in an eight-man tag team match, Prime, Ricky Ortiz, Eric Escobar and Sheamus O'Shaunessy defeated Riley, Justin Angel, Drew McIntyre and D.H. Smith. The feud also expanded to include Riley's valet, Beverly, with Prime teaming up with Angela to defeat Riley and Beverly. To end the feud, Prime teamed with Tyler Reks and Sheamus O'Shaunessy to beat Riley, McIntyre, and Lance Hoyt. For the remainder of the year, Prime competed sporadically, wrestling against Drew McIntyre, Vance Archer, Curt Hawkins, and Gabriel. He also lost a triple threat match, also involving Joe Hennig and Johnny Curtis, when Curtis pinned him.

At the beginning of 2010, Prime was still only competing sporadically, but defeated Joe Doering at the February 25 television tapings. At the next television taping in March however, he lost to Doering, who had been renamed Drake Brewer. On February 3, 2011, in a match made by General Manager and Cannon's new associate Maxine and with help from special guest referee Brett DiBiase, Cannon defeated Bo Rotundo to win the FCW Florida Heavyweight Championship, just moments after Rotundo had defeated Mason Ryan for the championship. Cannon's and Maxine's group was later joined by Aksana and Damien Sandow. Cannon lost the FCW Florida Heavyweight Championship back to Rotundo on May 19.

==== NXT (2010–2011) ====
On June 1, 2010, it was announced that Emminger would be participating in the second season of NXT, under the name “Lucky” Cannon, with Mark Henry as his mentor. He made his in-ring debut on the June 15 episode, teaming with Henry in a loss to Michael McGillicutty and Kofi Kingston. Following the match, another WWE Pro Cody Rhodes insulted Cannon, leading to the former accepting a challenge match against the latter for the following week. On the June 22 episode of NXT, Cannon lost a five-minute challenge match to Rhodes, being pinned after approximately four minutes. The following week, Cannon won the keg carry challenge, earning immunity from elimination. Later that night, Cannon teamed with McGillicutty and Kaval against Alex Riley, Eli Cottonwood and Titus O'Neil, which his team won when Kaval pinned Riley, giving Cannon his first win on NXT, and he was ranked fifth on the NXT poll. He retained his fifth-place ranking in the next poll on July 27. On August 9 the rookies appeared in a six-man tag team match on Raw, in which Cannon teamed with Kaval and Percy Watson in a loss to McGillicutty, Husky Harris and Alex Riley. The next night on NXT, Cannon's team won a rematch. Later that night, Cannon was eliminated from the competition when his ranking slipped to sixth. Cannon returned for the season finale of NXT on August 31, where he and the other eliminated rookies attacked the winner Kaval.

In March 2011, Cannon was selected as one of the six former NXT contestants to return to the show in its fifth season, and he received Tyson Kidd as his new Pro. During this season of NXT, Cannon had changed his character to that of a flamboyant and arrogant villain; instead of participating in the challenges to earn points, Cannon turned his attentions to wooing Maryse, NXT's co-host, causing a feud between himself and Yoshi Tatsu, who was also vying for Maryse's affections. Cannon managed to get Maryse's acceptance after he bought her a purse. On the June 14 episode of NXT, Cannon was eliminated from the competition, and Maryse heaped further misery by dumping Cannon after she realised that the purse he bought for her was a fake.

On August 8, 2011, Emminger was released from his WWE contract.

=== Independent circuit (2011) ===
On October 14, 2011, Emminger made his first wrestling appearance following his release from WWE, as he wrestled under the ring name Johnny Emminger and faced Florida Underground Wrestling (FUW) Heavyweight Champion Bruce Santee in a title match. However, Emminger was unsuccessful in winning the title due to being disqualified. Emminger has not wrestled since.

== Championships and accomplishments ==
- Florida Championship Wrestling
  - FCW Florida Heavyweight Championship (1 time)
- Pro Wrestling Illustrated
  - Ranked No. 260 of the top 500 wrestlers in the PWI 500 in 2011
