= Richie Steamboat =

American professional wrestler

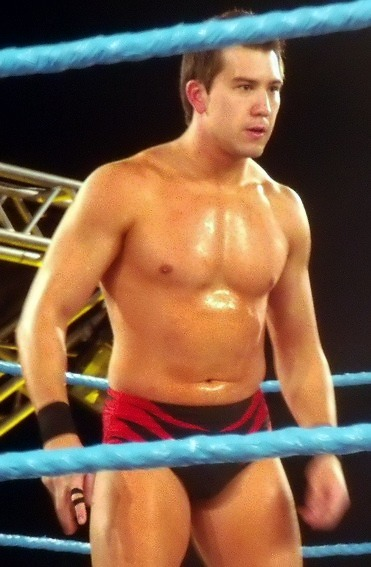
- Steamboat in April 2010

Personal information
- Born: Richard Henry Blood Jr. July 7, 1987 (age 39) Charlotte, North Carolina, U.S.
- Family: Ricky Steamboat (father); Vic Steamboat (uncle)

Professional wrestling career
- Ring name(s): Richie Steamboat; Ricky Steamboat Jr.
- Billed height: 6 ft 2 in (1.88 m)
- Billed weight: 213 lb (97 kg)
- Billed from: Charlotte, North Carolina
- Trained by: George South; Harley Race; Pro Wrestling Noah; Ricky Steamboat
- Debut: July 25, 2008
- Retired: December 2013

Richard Henry Blood Jr. (born July 7, 1987) is an American retired professional wrestler, better known by his ring name Richie Steamboat. He is known for wrestling in WWE's developmental territories Florida Championship Wrestling and NXT, and was the second FCW Grand Slam Champion having won the Florida Heavyweight Championship, Florida Tag Team Championship, and Jack Brisco 15 Championship.

== Early life ==
Blood's father, Richard Blood Sr., was a professional wrestler, known as Ricky Steamboat. His uncle, Vic Steamboat, was also a professional wrestler. Before he started in professional wrestling, he competed in amateur wrestling growing up, where he would sometimes wrestle against Reid Flair, the son of Ric Flair. He attended Lake Norman High School in Mooresville, North Carolina, where he was a member of the football team.

== Professional wrestling career ==
=== Training and early career (2008–2009) ===
As a child, under the gimmick name The Little Dragon, Blood appeared at WrestleMania IV, and later in World Championship Wrestling, accompanying his father Ricky Steamboat to the ring. When he was older, he trained with George South in Charlotte, North Carolina for several months. He later trained with Harley Race for approximately four months.

Blood made his professional wrestling debut on July 25, 2008, using the ring name 'Ricky Steamboat Jr.', when he defeated George South Jr. at a Premiere Wrestling Showcase event. The following month, Steamboat debuted for the Exodus Wrestling Alliance, when he defeated Mr. Florida to win the EWA Florida Heavyweight Championship on August 9. Just under a month later, on September 4, Steamboat vacated the championship. That same month, he debuted for Harley Race's World League Wrestling (WLW) promotion, teaming with Naomichi Marufuji to defeat Bao Nguyen and Takeshi Morishima on September 19. He went on a winning streak in WLW, defeating Darin Waid and Tommaso Ciampa, before defeating Terry Murdoch to win the EWA Missouri Heavyweight Championship at a WLW show on October 31. On November 15, Steamboat appeared at an Independent Wrestling Association Mid-South show, where he lost to Prince Mustafa Ali. Steamboat defeated Bobby Eaton to retain the EWA Missouri Heavyweight Championship on November 25, and defeated Eaton in a rematch later that night to win Eaton's EWA Georgia Heavyweight Championship, making him a double champion. On December 5, Steamboat defeated South with a roll-up in Greensboro, North Carolina. The following night, he defeated Jake Manning at Vance High School in Charlotte, North Carolina. In January 2009, Steamboat vacated both the EWA Missouri Heavyweight and the EWA Georgia Heavyweight Championships in order to wrestle in Japan.

In April 2009, Steamboat began wrestling for NWA Charlotte. After suffering an injury the previous night that required fourteen stitches, he was unable to wrestle at Final Destination in April, but was challenged by Vordell Walker. He lost the match to Walker on May 23 and teamed with Zack Salvation in a loss to The American Gangsters (Frank and Nicky) the following week. On July 9, 2009, Steamboat was part of the WLW show held in conjunction with the Lou Thesz Professional Wrestling Hall of Fame induction ceremony. The following day, Steamboat wrestled in a three-way match for the WLW Heavyweight Championship, but the match was won by Superstar Steve. On July 11, Steamboat wrestled on an NWA Mid Atlantic card, unsuccessfully challenging Ricky Nelson for the NWA Mid-Atlantic Junior Heavyweight Championship. His made his final independent circuit appearance on November 13, defeating Jake Manning at a Northeast Wrestling show.

=== Overseas (2009) ===
Blood lived and trained at the Pro Wrestling Noah Dojo in Japan for three months, beginning in January 2009. He made his Pro Wrestling Noah debut under the name 'Ricky Steamboat Jr.' on January 23, 2009, in a loss to Makoto Hashi. On February 15, Steamboat teamed with Buchanan in a loss to Akira Taue and Taiji Ishimori. Three days later, Steamboat, Buchanan, and Roderick Strong were defeated by Kotaro Suzuki, Muhammad Yone, and Takeshi Rikio. On February 21, Naomichi Marufuji and Atsushi Aoki defeated Steamboat and Doug Williams, and the following night, Steamboat and Ippei Ota lost to Yoshinobu Kanemaru and Kotaro Suzuki. His final appearance for Pro Wrestling Noah was on March 1, when he teamed with Tamon Honda and Jun Izumida in a loss to Takuma Sano, Kentaro Shiga, and Kishin Kawabata at Budokan Hall. On March 8, Steamboat wrestled at a Kensuke Office show, where he teamed with Ippei Ota in a loss to Katsuhiko Nakajima and Takashi Okita.

In mid-2009, Steamboat wrestled for the World Wrestling Council (WWC) in Puerto Rico. He made his WWC debut on July 24, by defeating Ricky Reyes. He went on to defeat Tommy Diablo, before losing to Orlando Colón on July 31. He then began to feud with Hiram Tua. The pair exchanged victories in singles matches, before Steamboat teamed with his father Ricky Steamboat to defeat Tua and Colón on August 15.

He also trained in Europe for a few months, and toured England with All Star Wrestling (ASW) in October 2009. He debuted in ASW on October 2, defeating Mark Haskins. Victories over Karl Kramer and Mikey Whiplash followed, and on October 18, Steamboat teamed with Gladiator Goliath to defeat the team of Jamie Gardner and Steve Allison. Two wins over Jimmy Jacobs were followed by further victories over Mikey Whiplash, and tag team victories over Doug Williams and Nick Aldis, and Gardner and Allison.

=== WWE (2009–2013) ===
Blood signed a contract with World Wrestling Entertainment (WWE) in December 2009, and was assigned to Florida Championship Wrestling (FCW), WWE's developmental territory.

Blood debuted in FCW on February 18, 2010, under the ring name Richie Steamboat and lost to Heath Slater in his first match for the promotion. His first victory in FCW came at the television taping on February 25, when he defeated Donny Marlow. He went on to wrestle against Derrick Bateman, Wade Barrett, Curt Hawkins, Alex Riley, and Johnny Curtis, before suffering a torn Posterior cruciate ligament in March, which sidelined him for several months. Following his return, he teamed with his father to defeat The Dudebusters of Trent Barreta and Caylen Croft on June 20. In August, he unsuccessfully challenged Mason Ryan for the FCW Florida Heavyweight Championship. Throughout late 2010, he competed against wrestlers including Jinder Mahal, Roman Leakee, Curtis Axel, Lucky Cannon, and Byron Saxton.

In December 2010, Steamboat formed a tag team with Seth Rollins, with the pair defeating Jacob Novak and Mahal in their first match as a team. On January 6, 2011, Steamboat and Rollins challenged Titus O'Neill and Damien Sandow for the FCW Florida Tag Team Championship, but were unsuccessful. At the Miami-Dade County Fair on March 25, Steamboat and Rollins defeated O'Neill and Sandow to win the FCW Florida Tag Team Championship. They held the championship until May 12, when they dropped it to the team of Calvin Raines and Big E. Langston.

In late 2011, Steamboat interfered in a fatal four-way match for the FCW Florida Heavyweight Championship, and accidentally superkicked Husky Harris. On the following episode of FCW television, Steamboat began a heel turn when he attacked Harris again, after finding him standing over Aksana, and believing Harris had attacked her. As a result, Steamboat and Harris began feuding, with their first match ending in a no contest. Leo Kruger later defeated the pair in a triple threat match to retain the FCW Florida Heavyweight Championship, and the following week, Steamboat lost to Harris in a No Hold Barred match. After the pair continued to attack each other backstage and during matches, both men were suspended for 30 days. Upon their return, Steamboat lost to Harris in a Bullrope match to end their feud. On January 13, 2012, at the FCW television taping, Steamboat defeated Damien Sandow by two falls to one to win the FCW Jack Brisco 15 Championship. On July 20, 2012, at a live event, Steamboat defeated Rick Victor to win the FCW Florida Heavyweight Championship. He was the final FCW champion.

In mid-2012, WWE rebranded FCW into NXT. In June, Steamboat debuted for NXT at the inaugural taping from Full Sail University, defeating both Rick Victor and Leo Kruger in separate matches. The latter match was a quarter-final in the Gold Rush tournament to determine the inaugural NXT Champion. On the August 15 episode of NXT, Steamboat was eliminated by Jinder Mahal in the semi-finals. Steamboat then started a feud with Kassius Ohno; Steamboat defeated Ohno twice, but Ohno conducted successful post-match assaults on Steamboat. Ohno then injured and pinned Steamboat during a six-man tag match while teaming with the Ascension against Steamboat and the Usos on the October 17 episode of NXT. Steamboat returned from injury and decisively pinned Ohno on the November 21, 2012 episode of NXT to end the feud.

This was his final televised match after suffering a back injury for which he required surgery. More than a year later in December 2013, it was reported Blood had been released from his WWE contract. This was contradicted by later reports, which stated he remained under contract. However, in April 2015, his father stated that due to the injury and subsequent surgery, he would be unable to wrestle again.

== Personal life ==
Blood also raced Legend Cars and Bandoleros under his ring name for several years at Charlotte Motor Speedway in the annual Summer Shootout Series. In March 2023, Ricky revealed that Richie is married to his wife, Anna, a lawyer, and together, they have four children.

== Championships and accomplishments ==
- Exodus Wrestling Alliance
  - EWA Florida Heavyweight Championship (1 time)
  - EWA Georgia Heavyweight Championship (1 time)
  - EWA Missouri Heavyweight Championship (1 time)
- Florida Championship Wrestling
  - FCW Florida Heavyweight Championship (1 time)
  - FCW Jack Brisco 15 Championship (1 time)
  - FCW Florida Tag Team Championship (1 time) – with Seth Rollins
  - Second FCW Grand Slam Champion
- Pro Wrestling Illustrated
  - PWI ranked him 99 of the top 500 singles wrestlers in the PWI 500 in 2012
