= Celtic warrior =

Celtic warrior may refer to:

- the aristocracy of the Celts
- Sheamus (b. 1978), an Irish professional wrestler
- Steve Collins (b. 1964), a former professional boxer
- Mason Ryan, Welsh stunt performer, actor, and former professional wrestler
- Celtic Warriors, a 2003-04 rugby team
