= Alex Riley =

American professional wrestler (born 1981)

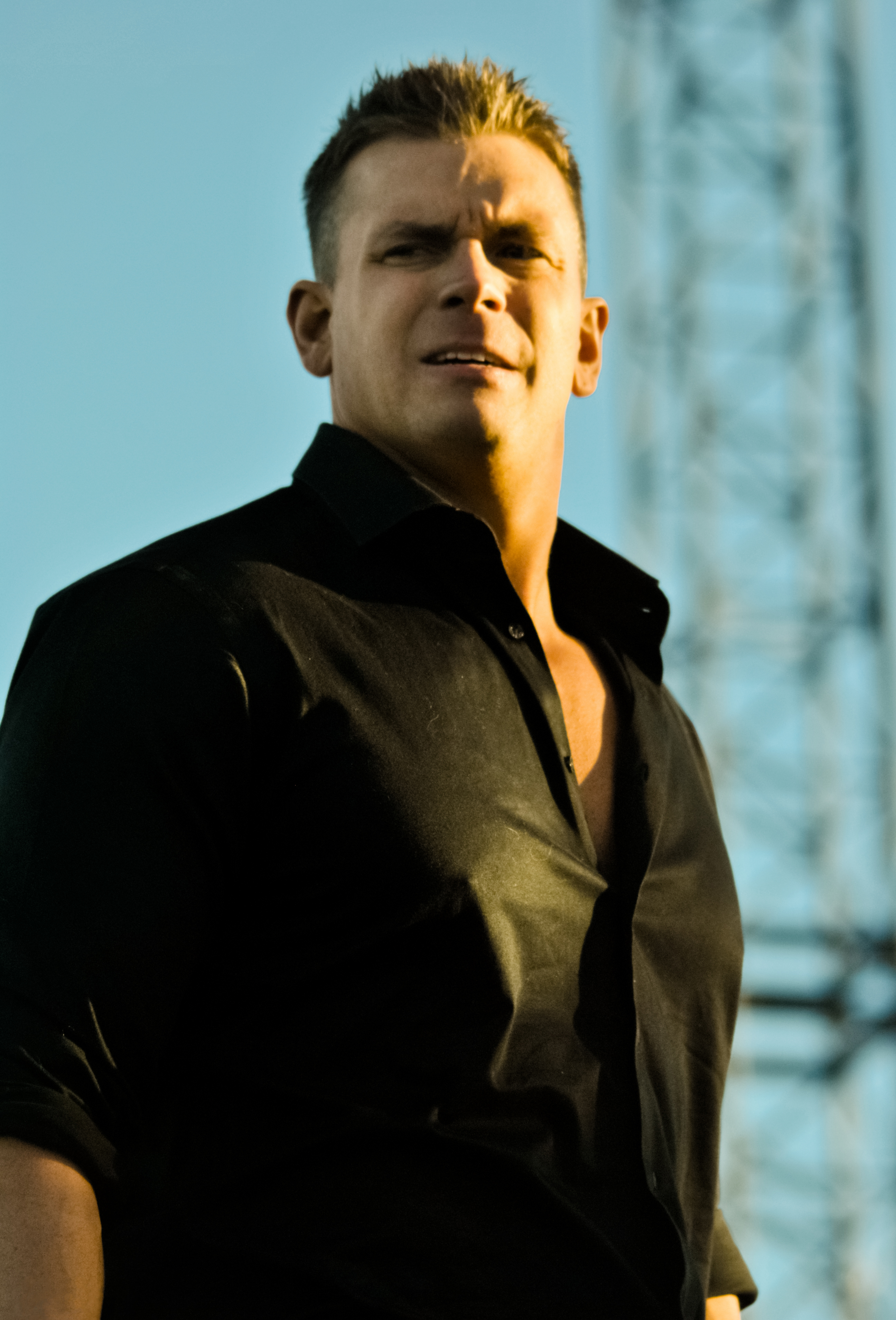
- Riley in 2010

Personal information
- Born: Kevin Robert Kiley Jr. April 28, 1981 (age 45) Fairfax Station, Virginia, U.S.
- Education: Boston College
- Family: Kevin Kiley (father)

Professional wrestling career
- Ring name(s): Alex Riley; Carson Oakley; Kevin Kiley Jr.
- Billed height: 6 ft 3 in (191 cm)
- Billed weight: 236 lb (107 kg)
- Billed from: Washington, D.C.
- Trained by: Florida Championship Wrestling
- Debut: October 30, 2007
- Retired: 2023

Kevin Robert Kiley Jr. (born April 28, 1981) is an American retired professional wrestler and commentator. He is best known for his tenure in WWE, under the ring name Alex Riley, where he was a participant in the second season of NXT.

== Professional wrestling career ==
=== World Wrestling Entertainment ===
==== Florida Championship Wrestling (2007–2010) ====
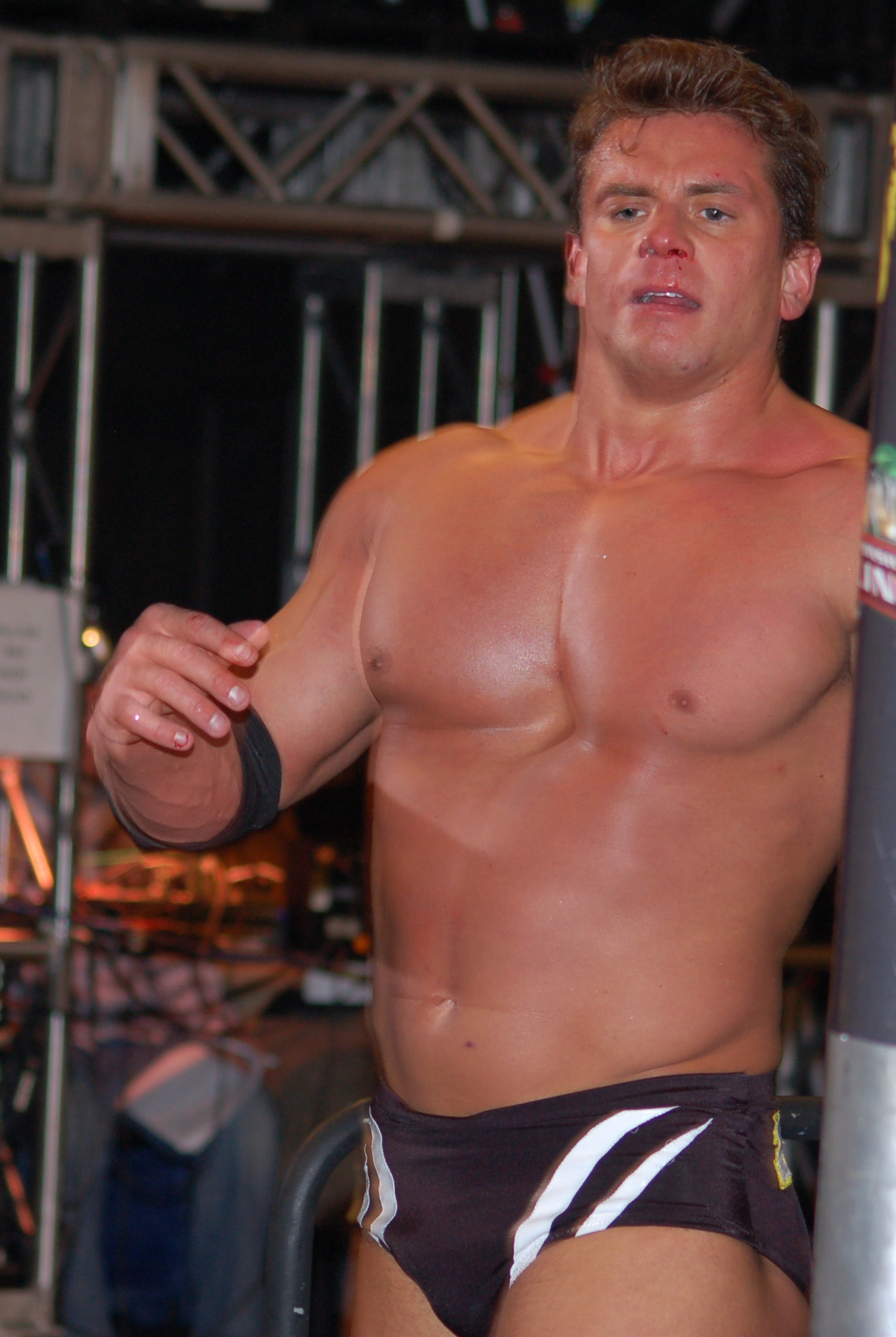
Riley following a match in January 2010

In 2007, Kiley signed a developmental contract with World Wrestling Entertainment (WWE) and was assigned to their developmental territory, Florida Championship Wrestling (FCW). On October 30, 2007, he debuted in a losing effort to Shawn Osbourne under his real name Kevin Kiley, and later faced off with wrestlers like Sebastian Slater and Jack Gabriel.

In September 2008, he changed his ring name to Carson Oakley. As Oakley, he began teaming with Scotty Goldman, and the pairing unsuccessfully challenged TJ Wilson and DH Smith for the Florida Tag Team Championship in November. In early December, he underwent another name change, calling himself Alex Riley and developing the gimmick of a university jock, complete with a letterman's jacket as a part of his attire. He gained Beverly Mullins as a manager, and to fit with his jock gimmick, Mullins adopted the gimmick of a prom queen.

In 2009, he joined FCW General Manager Abraham Washington's cabinet, being called Washington's "top draft pick", and as a result, was named the number one contender to Tyler Reks' FCW Florida Heavyweight Championship in July. In August, he lost in a triple threat match including Reks and Johnny Curtis. In mid-2009, he competed in several dark matches prior to Raw and SmackDown, wrestling against Jamie Noble, Montel Vontavious Porter and Jimmy Wang Yang, and also appeared at house shows. On the August 30 episode of FCW, Riley dropped Mullins as his manager, calling her "dead weight".

On March 18, 2010, Riley defeated Justin Gabriel and Wade Barrett in a triple threat match to win the FCW Florida Heavyweight Championship. After his title win he called out Barrett and paid him for his services as a hired help. At the July 22 FCW tapings, Riley lost the title to Mason Ryan in a triple threat match, also involving Johnny Curtis. At the television tapings on September 22, Riley faced Ryan in a rematch, but lost by submission.

==== NXT and alliance with the Miz (2010–2011) ====
On June 1, 2010, The Miz announced that he would mentor Riley for the second season of NXT. He made his NXT debut on the June 8 episode, but did not compete in a match. He made his in-ring debut on the following edition of NXT, defeating Kaval. Kaval returned the favor two weeks later, by pinning Riley in a six-man tag team match. Later that night, Riley was ranked fourth in the first poll. In the second poll on the July 27 episode of NXT, Riley moved up to third place, behind Michael McGillicutty and Kaval. On August 9 the rookies appeared in a six-man tag team match on Raw, in which Riley teamed with Husky Harris and Michael McGillicutty to defeat Lucky Cannon, Kaval and Percy Watson. The following night however, Riley's team lost a rematch, and he slipped to fifth place in the poll, narrowly avoiding elimination. Riley was eliminated from NXT in the season finale on August 31, ending up in third place overall. After Kaval was announced as the winner, Riley and the other eliminated rookies attacked him.

He appeared on the September 6 episode of Raw, when he tried to help his mentor The Miz, who had been placed in the LeBell Lock submission hold by Daniel Bryan, but ended up being placed in the hold himself. He appeared again the following week, replacing The Miz in a submission match against Bryan, but lost. On the September 20 episode of Raw The Miz announced that he had signed Riley to a "personal services contract", allowing Riley to accompany The Miz to ringside and continue to appear on Raw. As The Miz's protégé, Riley interfered in his matches, including at the Bragging Rights pay-per-view, where Riley unsuccessfully attempted to help The Miz's team win. The Miz also used Riley as a replacement for himself in matches, which led to Riley facing and losing to John Cena on November 15 and Ezekiel Jackson in a King of the Ring qualifying match on November 22 as a result. The following week, Riley interfered in the Tables, Ladders, and Chairs match for the WWE Championship between Jerry Lawler and The Miz, who had won the championship the week prior. Riley stopped Lawler from winning twice, before Lawler put him through a table. He helped The Miz to retain the championship again at TLC: Tables, Ladders & Chairs in a Tables match, during which he was put through a table by Randy Orton.

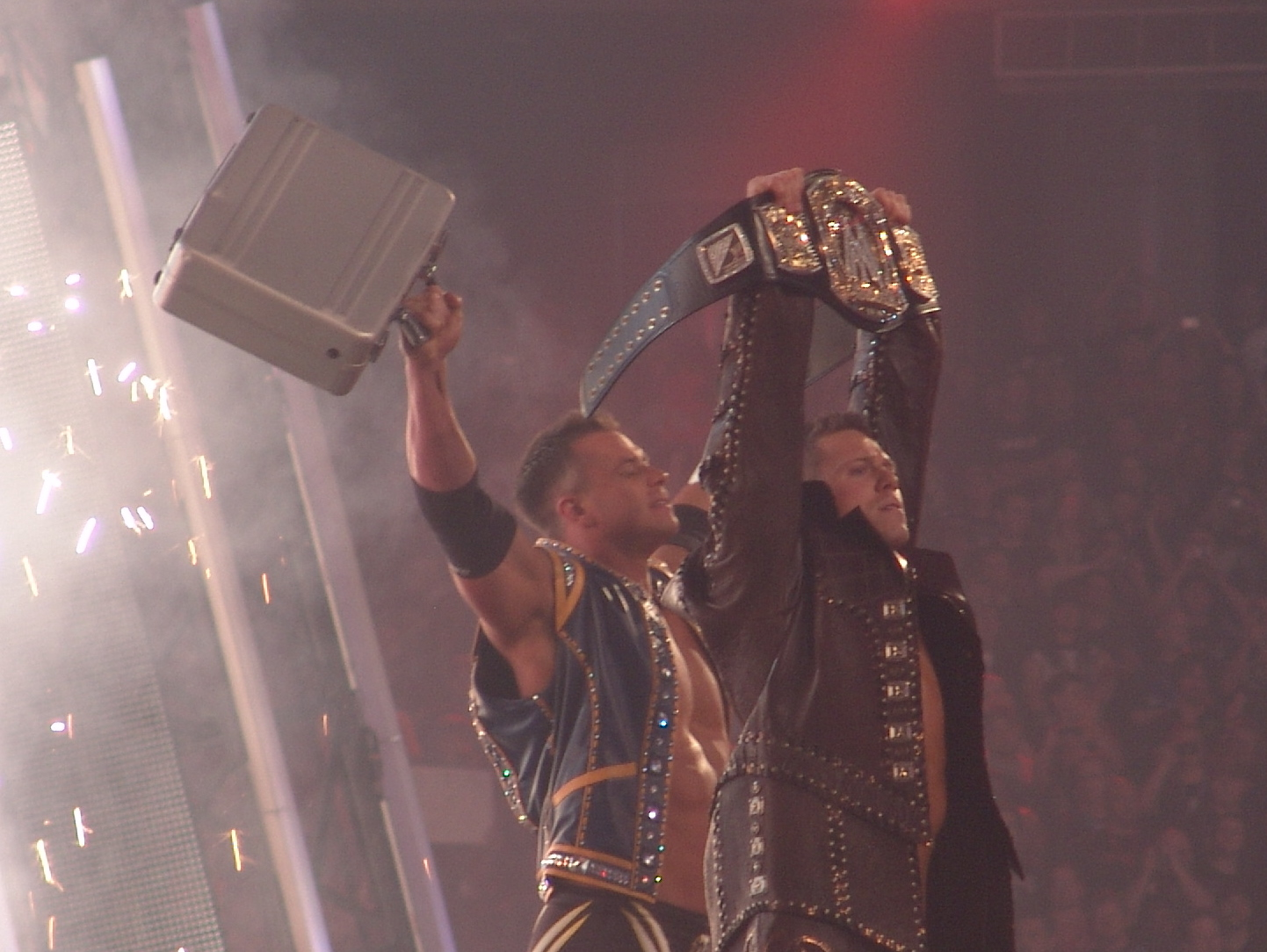
Riley (left) with The Miz at WrestleMania XXVII

On the February 28 episode of Raw, John Cena challenged Riley to a match which, if Cena won, Riley would no longer be The Miz's apprentice. The Miz accepted the match on Riley's behalf, and later that night, Cena and Riley faced off in a steel cage match. Riley lost the match despite interference from The Miz. The angle was used to write Riley off television as he was scheduled to be sent back to Florida Championship Wrestling to be repackaged. Despite this, Riley appeared on the March 14 episode of Raw, interfering in The Miz's match against The Great Khali. The following week, Riley announced that The Miz had re-hired him, this time as The Miz's VP of Corporate Communications. He accompanied The Miz to his match at WrestleMania XXVII against Cena where he interfered several times, throwing Cena into an exposed turnbuckle, attacking him with his briefcase, and distracting the referee.

==== Singles competition (2011–2013) ====
As part of the 2011 Supplemental Draft on April 26, Riley was moved to the SmackDown brand, separating him from The Miz. Riley debuted on the April 29 episode of SmackDown by interrupting Randy Orton, but had an RKO performed on him before he could speak. Despite being drafted, Riley continued to appear on Raw alongside The Miz. On the May 2 episode of Raw, The Miz chastised Riley not being at ringside at Extreme Rules the previous night when The Miz had lost the WWE Championship to Cena. Riley appeared alongside The Miz at the Over the Limit pay-per-view and attempted to help The Miz win his "I Quit" match against Cena, but The Miz was unsuccessful and failed to regain the WWE Championship. The following night on the May 23 episode of Raw, The Miz's request for another WWE Championship match was immediately denied and The Miz blamed him. Riley proceeded to attack The Miz, and turning face in the process. The following week, Michael Cole announced that Riley had been rehired by the Anonymous Raw General Manager and he returned to Raw, as in storyline he had not been eligible to be drafted as he was under contract to The Miz, not WWE. Following an argument Riley attacked Cole, before chasing away The Miz who had tried to attack him from behind.

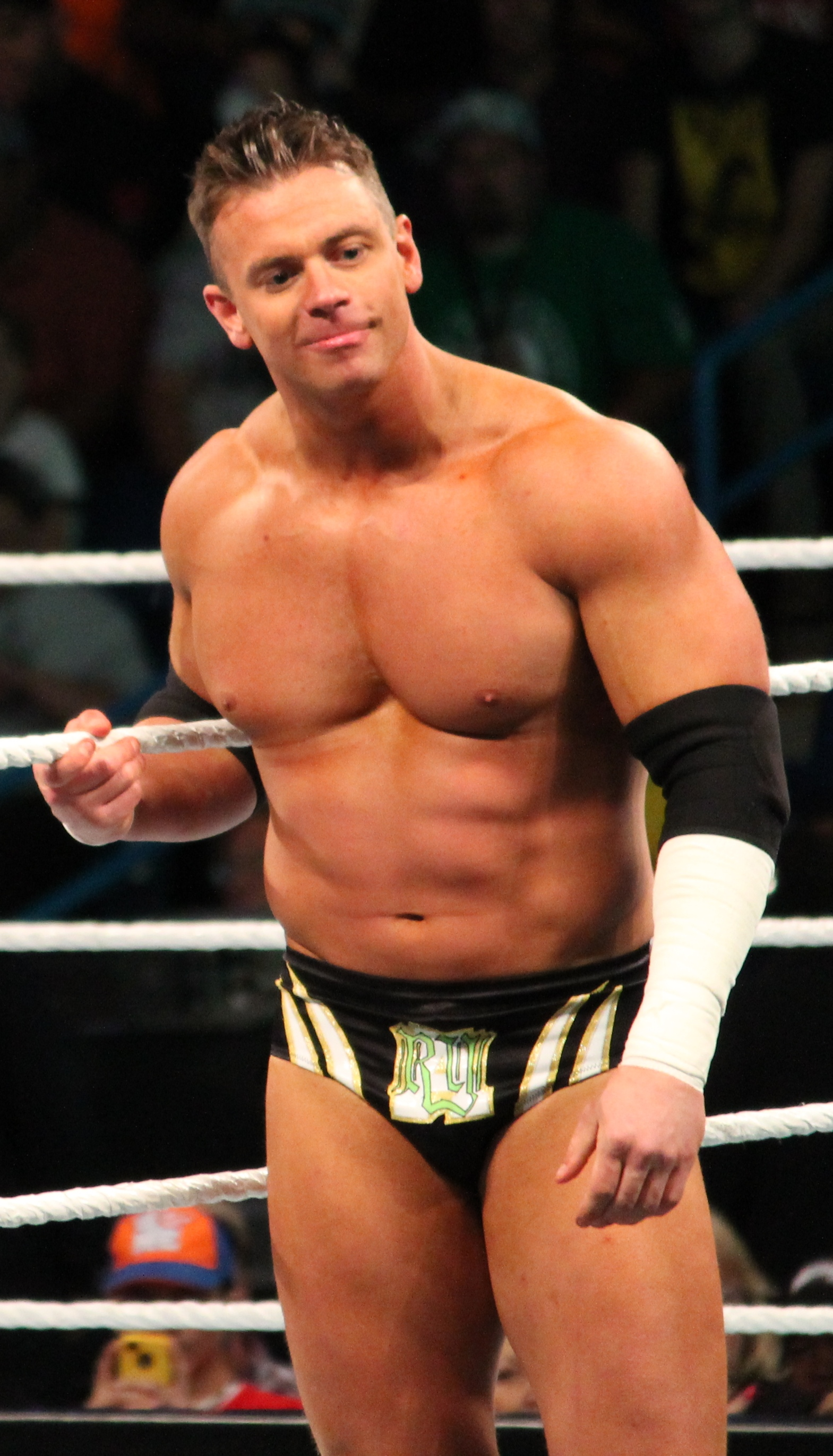
Riley in 2012

On the June 6 episode of Raw, Riley teamed with John Cena to face R-Truth and The Miz, with Steve Austin as the special guest referee but were defeated as Cena couldn't trust him. On the same show, it was confirmed that Riley would face The Miz at Capitol Punishment. At Capitol Punishment, Riley defeated The Miz. The following night on Raw, Riley teamed with John Cena and Randy Orton to take on The Miz, R-Truth and Christian in a six-man tag team elimination match. Riley was the first person eliminated, but his team went on to win the match. At Money in the Bank, Riley competed in a Money in the Bank ladder match which was won by Alberto Del Rio. The following night on Raw, Riley was one of the eight men placed in the WWE Championship tournament but lost to The Miz in the first round, ending their feud.

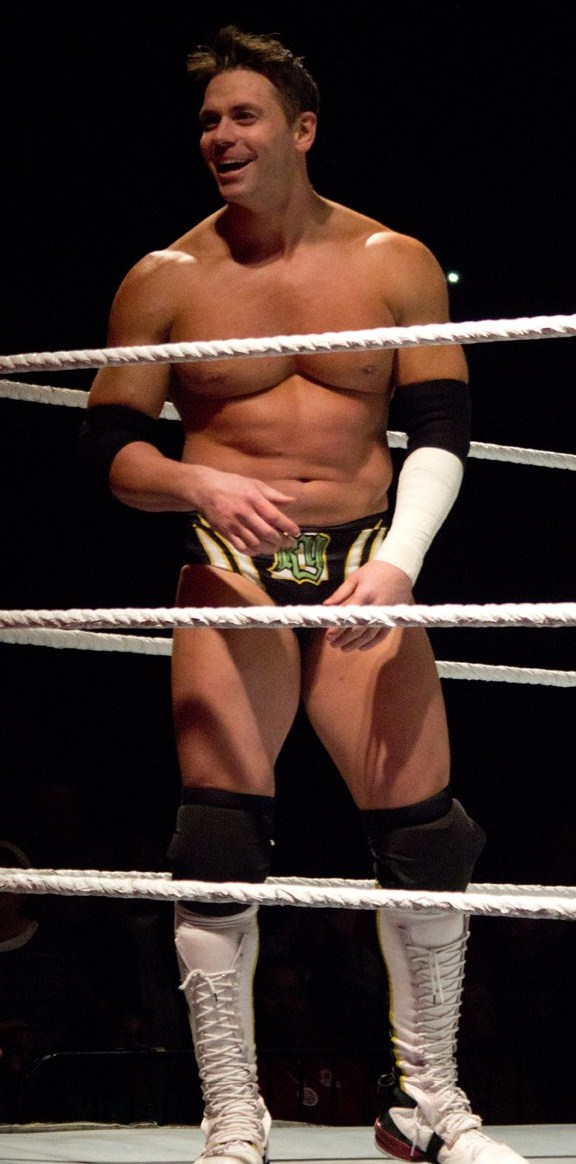
Riley in 2013

On the August 1 episode of Raw, Riley began a feud with the United States Champion Dolph Ziggler, beginning with a verbal confrontation. Riley and Ziggler faced off the following week, with Riley winning by disqualification after Vickie Guerrero, Ziggler's manager, slapped him. On the August 15 episode of Raw, Riley lost to Jack Swagger due to interference by Guerrero, who also managed Swagger. Riley defeated Swagger in a rematch the following week after Swagger was distracted by Guerrero and Ziggler arguing at ringside. At Night of Champions, Riley competed in a fatal four-way match for the United States Championship which also involved Ziggler, Swagger and John Morrison, in which Ziggler retained his title. In October, Riley suffered a legitimate hip injury that left him inactive for several weeks. For the remainder of 2011 after his return, Riley was largely relegated to appearing on Superstars, defeating the likes of Drew McIntyre and JTG.

In 2012, Riley had a 14-match losing streak, losing to the likes of Brodus Clay, Lord Tensai and Heath Slater. Riley entered the 2012 Royal Rumble as the second entrant, and was eliminated first by The Miz. Riley claimed a rare victory on the May 2 episode of NXT when he teamed with Tyson Kidd to beat JTG and Johnny Curtis. After several months absence from television, he made his return on the July 3 episode of SmackDown in a World Heavyweight Championship Money in the Bank qualifying match against Dolph Ziggler, in a losing effort. Riley ended his singles losing streak on August 6 episode of Raw by defeating Ziggler with a roll-up after a distraction from Chris Jericho on commentary. On September 21, Riley announced that he was undergoing elbow and knee surgery. In January 2013, Riley teamed up with Derrick Bateman to take part in the NXT Tag Team Championship Tournament, and the two were defeated by Kassius Ohno and Leo Kruger in the first round. On the January 21, 2013 episode of Raw (the final episode before the Royal Rumble), Riley made his first televised appearance in 5 months as part of a show-closing brawl. Riley next appeared on the April 17 episode of Main Event, competing in an 11-man battle royal to determine the number 1 contender for the Intercontinental Championship and surviving until the final four when he was eliminated by Primo.

==== Color commentary (2013–2015) ====
Following his lack of in-ring success, Riley transitioned to a color commentary role. At the June 24 Raw taping, Riley debuted as the new color commentator of Superstars. Riley became a regular commentator for NXT starting at the July 11 tapings. He also frequently served as color commentator on Main Event.

Following the launch of the WWE Network, Riley became known as "The Analyst" Alex Riley and adopted a persona similar to a sports commentator or agent. Riley was a regular member of the expert panel on both the Raw and SmackDown pre-shows on the WWE Network, and also made several appearances on pay-per-view in this role.

In 2013 and 2014, Riley made occasional in-ring appearances at WWE live events, picking up untelevised wins over the likes of Tyson Kidd, Curt Hawkins and Heath Slater.

==== Return to in-ring competition and departure (2015–2016) ====
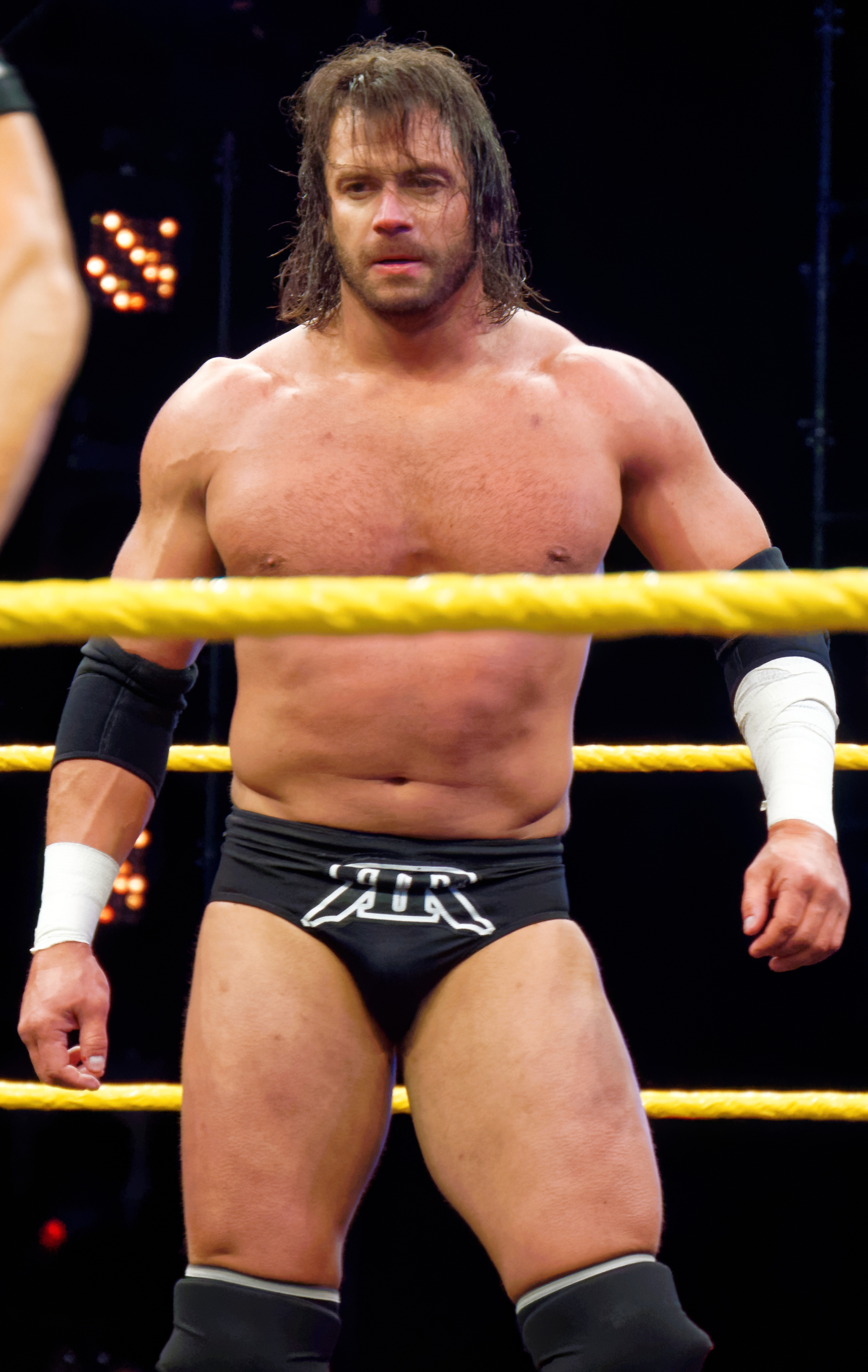
Riley in 2016

Throughout late 2014 and early 2015, Riley started a Twitter campaign with the hashtag #FreeRiley, apparently in an attempt to get management to notice him and book him as an in-ring competitor, given that his last televised match was in 2013. After a storyline which involved him being harassed on commentary by NXT Champion Kevin Owens, Riley returned to televised competition on the March 11 edition of NXT, defeating CJ Parker. After the match, Owens called Riley "the dumbest man in NXT" for returning to the ring and threatened to destroy his career. On March 29 at WrestleMania 31, Riley competed in the André The Giant Memorial Battle Royal but was eliminated by Damien Mizdow. Kevin Owens attacked Riley during an NXT taping on April 22, in which Owens kayfabe injured his knee. On May 1, it was announced that Riley would undergo surgery, to fix the legitimate degenerative arthritis in his knee.

Riley made his return from injury on the January 27, 2016 episode of NXT after eight months of inactivity, sporting longer hair and beard, in a winning effort against Bull Dempsey, turning heel for the first time since 2011. In the next 3 weeks, he was defeated by Tye Dillinger in back-to-back matches. On March 31 episode of NXT, he was defeated by Apollo Crews. On May 11 episode of NXT taping, Riley worked his last WWE match where he was defeated by Shinsuke Nakamura.

Riley was released from his WWE contract along with several other wrestlers on May 6, 2016.

=== Independent circuit (2022–2023) ===
After a six-year hiatus, Kiley, under his Alex Riley ring name, returned to wrestling at a Create A Pro Wrestling event on December 8, 2022, teaming with Tyrus. As "The Rare Breed" Kevin Kiley, he appeared for the National Wrestling Alliance (NWA) at their Nuff Said event on February 11, 2023, in a losing effort to EC3.

== Other media ==
Riley is a playable character in WWE '12 as well as appearing in WWE SuperCard.

== Personal life ==
Riley's father, Kevin Kiley Sr., is a sports reporter and commentator. His mother, Lauren (née Riley), is a former Miss Virginia.

Riley attended Robinson Secondary School in Fairfax, VA, where he played both football and basketball. He then went to Boston College, where he majored in communications. He played for the Boston College Eagles football team, initially as a quarterback, before becoming a linebacker during the 2001 season. He also tried out for the Canadian Football League's Montreal Alouettes.

Riley once had a job selling medical equipment. He is Catholic and has a tattoo of a Celtic cross on his back. He was arrested for DUI in Florida in November 2010, yet the charges were dismissed in July 2011 after Hillsborough County Circuit Judge Dick Greco Jr. ruled that law enforcement did not have probable cause to stop Riley's vehicle and thus violated his fourth amendment rights against unreasonable searches and seizures.

In 2025, Riley revealed on his Instagram that he has suffered from functional neurological symptom disorder since he was a teenager.

== Filmography ==
List of film performances
Year	Title	Role	Notes
2017	Glass Jaw	Mike Mathews	
2019	Bennett's War	Dixon	

List of television performances
Year	Title	Role	Notes
2017	GLOW	Steel Horse	1 Episode

== Championships and accomplishments ==
- Florida Championship Wrestling
  - FCW Florida Heavyweight Championship (1 time)
- Pro Wrestling Illustrated
  - Ranked No. 106 of the top 500 wrestlers in the PWI 500 in 2011
