= Mason Ryan =

Welsh actor and former professional wrestler (born 1982)

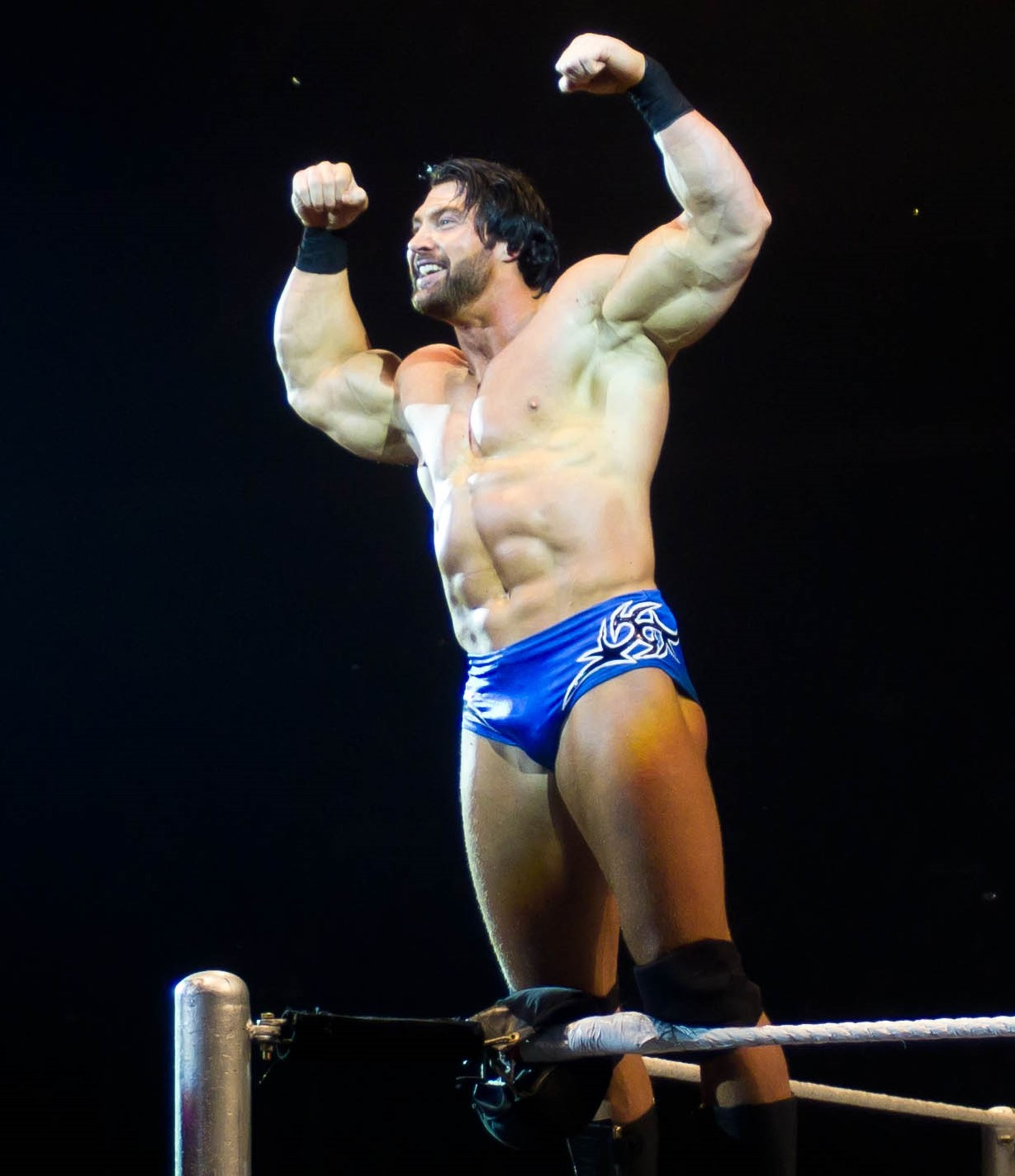
- Griffiths in 2011

Personal information
- Born: Barri Griffiths; 13 January 1982 (age 44) Tremadog, Wales
- Spouse: Julie Rolfe (m. 2015)

Professional wrestling career
- Ring names: Barri Griffiths; Mason Ryan; Mason Williams; Smackdown Warrior
- Billed height: 6 ft 5 in (1.96 m)
- Billed weight: 297 lb (135 kg)
- Billed from: Cardiff, Wales
- Trained by: Orig Williams; Florida Championship Wrestling
- Debut: 2007
- Retired: 2015

Barri Griffiths (born 13 January 1982) is a Welsh stunt performer, actor, and retired professional wrestler. He is best known for his time with WWE, where he performed under the ring name Mason Ryan from 2009 to 2014. He joined Cirque du Soleil in 2016.

Griffiths played as a centre back for Porthmadog FC, but a knee injury curtailed his career. He appeared as Goliath on Gladiators in 2009. He began training to be a professional wrestler in 2006, and competed around Europe for the next three years. In 2009, he signed a contract with WWE, debuting in Florida Championship Wrestling (FCW) and becoming a one-time FCW Florida Heavyweight Champion. He made his main roster debut in 2011 and joined The New Nexus. In 2013, he started working on WWE's NXT brand until his release the following year.

== Early life ==
Griffiths was born in Tremadog, the son of Carys and Malcolm Griffiths. He has a sister named Catrin. He attended Ysgol y Gorlan primary school in Tremadog and Ysgol Eifionydd secondary school in Porthmadog, before studying construction management at Cardiff University for 18 months. He worked as a trainee carpenter and in his family's funeral home prior to becoming a wrestler. Griffiths played football as a centre back for Porthmadog FC, but had to curtail his career due to a knee injury.

== Professional wrestling career ==
=== Training and early career (2006–2009) ===
Griffiths began training to be a professional wrestler in 2006 after attending a wrestling show with a friend where the promoter and referee Orig Williams recommended he start wrestling. He trained at a professional wrestling school in Birkenhead.

Prior to appearing on Gladiators, Griffiths had wrestled under the names "Celtic Warrior" and "Smackdown Warrior" since 2007, and had competed in almost 100 matches. He represented the UK in a 'Battle of the Nations' tag team match between the UK and Austria, teaming with Drew McDonald and Sheamus O'Shaunessy in a losing effort to Chris Raaber, Michael Kovac, and Robert Ray Kreuzer at the European Wrestling Association's Night of Gladiators show in June 2007. After signing with World Wrestling Entertainment (WWE), Griffiths had his final show in Wales in October 2008 in Porthmadog, when he won a singles match and battle royal.

=== World Wrestling Entertainment / WWE (2009–2014) ===
==== Florida Championship Wrestling (2009–2011) ====
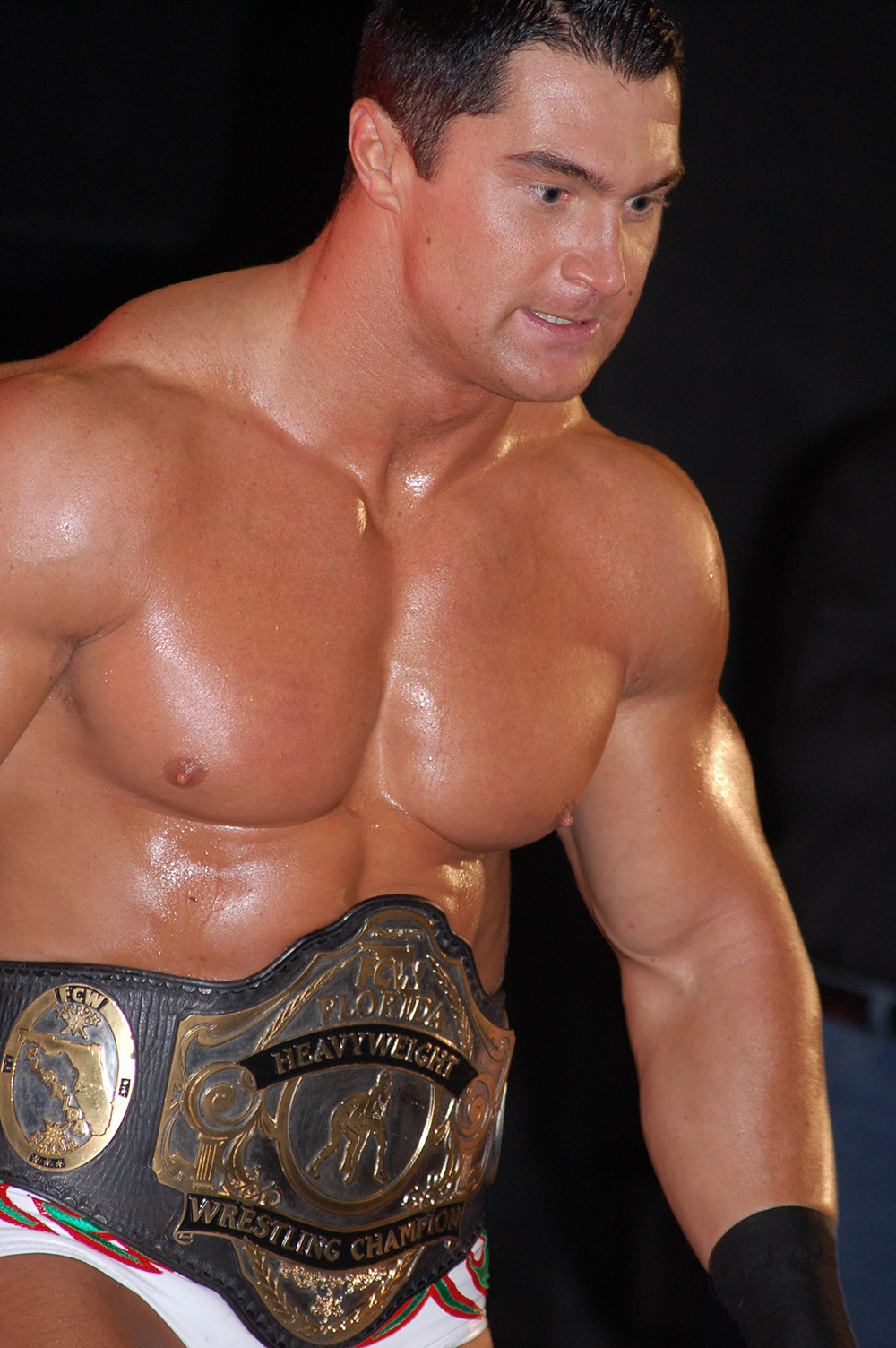
Ryan as the FCW Florida Heavyweight Champion in 2010

In 2009, Griffiths signed a five-year contract with World Wrestling Entertainment (WWE). When he received his work visa, he debuted in their developmental territory, Florida Championship Wrestling (FCW) in January 2010. Under the name Mason Ryan, he competed against wrestlers including Johnny Curtis, Tyler Reks, Johnny Prime, and Hunico in his first matches.

On 22 July, Ryan won a triple threat match against defending champion Alex Riley and Johnny Curtis by pinning Riley to win the FCW Florida Heavyweight Championship for the first time.

Over the next few months, Ryan successfully defended the championship against wrestlers including Bo Rotundo, Richie Steamboat, and Eli Cottonwood. At the tapings of FCW television on 2 September, Ryan successfully defended the championship against Johnny Curtis when FCW commentator Byron Saxton interfered and aided him. The following week, Saxton became aligned with Ryan, accompanying him to the ring and acting as his manager.

In November 2010, Ryan toured Europe with the SmackDown brand, defeating Chavo Guerrero in Belfast on 4 November and again in Liverpool on 6 November. On 3 February 2011, Ryan lost the Florida Heavyweight Championship to Bo Rotundo, ending a six-and-a-half month reign.

==== Raw (2011–2012) ====
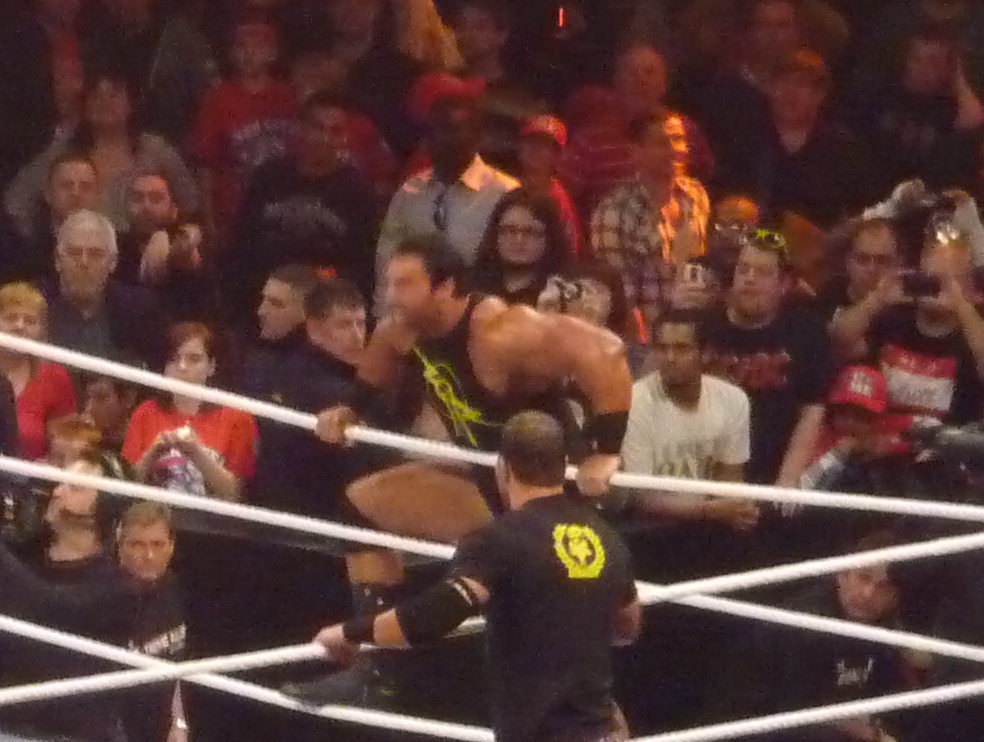
Ryan with The New Nexus in 2011

Griffiths, as Mason Ryan, made his WWE television debut on 17 January 2011 episode of Raw by interfering in a match between CM Punk and John Cena. Following his interference, Punk presented him with a 'Nexus' armband, inducting him into the group. Ryan then participated in the 2011 Royal Rumble match. On 7 February 2011, he had his debut match on Raw, losing to R-Truth via disqualification. In late February, it was announced that Punk would face Randy Orton at WrestleMania XXVII, with each member of The Nexus facing Orton to win the right to accompany Punk to the ring in the weeks leading up to WrestleMania. Ryan was the final member to face Orton, but lost on 14 March episode of Raw. Following the match, Orton punted Ryan in the head. He was absent from television for nearly a month, making his return on 11 April on Raw with the other New Nexus members, attacking Orton and preventing him from earning a WWE Championship match. On 2 May, Ryan lost to Kane by disqualification following interference from Punk, and went on to attack both Kane and Big Show. At the Over the Limit pay-per-view on 22 May, Ryan and Punk challenged Big Show and Kane for the WWE Tag Team Championship, but were unsuccessful. The following month, Ryan suffered an injury and was absent from television to recuperate.

Ryan returned from injury at a house show in Jackson, Mississippi in late August. He made his television return on 8 September episode of WWE Superstars, defeating JTG. On 26 September, on Raw, Ryan was chosen by Vickie Guerrero as the partner for Jack Swagger and Dolph Ziggler in a six-man tag team match against Zack Ryder and Air Boom (Evan Bourne and Kofi Kingston), but Ryan turned on Swagger and Ziggler turning Ryan face, allowing Ryder to pick up the victory for his team.

The following week on Raw, Ryan teamed with Air Boom, Sheamus, CM Punk, and John Cena in a 12-man tag team match to defeat the team of Alberto Del Rio, Christian, Cody Rhodes, David Otunga, Ziggler, and Swagger. Ryan began feuding with Ziggler, with the pair trading wins via disqualification. Ryan was part of Team Orton at the Survivor Series pay-per-view in November, where he was eliminated by Cody Rhodes.

==== NXT (2012–2014) ====
He appeared only sporadically on television throughout 2012, and he then rejoined the rebranded developmental system NXT. He returned to the ring in November for house shows and debuted on the rebooted WWE NXT show and began his singles winning streak on 30 January 2013, by defeating Sakamoto.

Ryan then entered into a feud against Enzo Amore and Colin Cassady; although he easily defeated them in singles matches, he lost to them in a handicap match. Mason was then rarely used on WWE television until he had his final televised match on 24 April 2014 episode of NXT, in a losing effort to number one contender for the NXT Championship. On 30 April 2014, it was reported that Ryan had been released by WWE.

=== Independent circuit (2014–2015) ===
After his release from WWE, Griffiths began wrestling on the independent circuit, still using his WWE name. His first appearance was for the American Pro Wrestling Alliance promotion, where he became the new APWA Tri State Champion on 31 May. Mason made his debut for the WrestleSport promotion on 16 August where he defeated Adam Pearce to become the first WrestleSport Heavyweight Champion. On 5 September, at Full Impact Pro's Fallout, Ryan along with Michael Tarver and Shaun Ricker participated in a trios tournament, but were defeated by the Full Impact Puerto Ricans (Lince Dorado, Jay Cruz, and Jay Rios). On 5 June 2015, Ryan was defeated by then-Full Impact Pro Heavyweight Champion, Rich Swann.

On 11 October 2014, Ryan won the UPWA Heavyweight Championship in Shallotte, North Carolina. His last wrestling appearance to date, was in the United Kingdom for Pro Wrestling Pride on 1 November 2015, he was on the losing team in an 8-man tag team match.

=== TNA appearance (2015) ===
On 16 February 2015, Ryan took part in a dark match before the TNA One Night Only's Gut check event defeating Shaun Ricker.

=== Inoki Genome Federation (2015) ===
On 20 February 2015, Griffiths, working under the ring name Mason Williams, made his debut for the Japanese Inoki Genome Federation (IGF) promotion, losing to Shogun Okamoto.

== Cirque du Soleil career ==
In January 2016, Ryan announced on his Twitter account that he is now working at Cirque du Soleil, as the chief archer of Kà.

== Other media ==
Griffiths appeared in the second series of the revived Gladiators television show in 2009, and competed under the name "Goliath". When he was working on a television show in Wales about being a wrestler, he was told that producers were looking for new gladiators, and he applied with the encouragement of his trainer, Orig Williams. He began filming the first show approximately a month later and had to grow a beard especially for the role.

Griffiths has appeared on The Paul O'Grady Show. Barri Griffiths: Y Reslar, a Welsh language documentary about Griffiths' life in the months before he moved to the United States, aired in September 2010 on S4C.

In December 2011, Griffiths appeared on the TV documentary Orig, where he was interviewed by Tara Bethan, the daughter of his first trainer Orig Williams.

== Personal life ==
Griffiths married American football player Julie Rolfe in 2015. They reside in Tampa, Florida.

Griffiths speaks Welsh fluently. He is an avid weightlifter and once set a world record for holding 20 kg (approx. 44 lbs) of weight with his arms straight for just over one minute.

== Championships and accomplishments ==
- American Pro Wrestling Alliance
  - APWA Tri State Championship (1 time)
- Florida Championship Wrestling
  - FCW Florida Heavyweight Championship (1 time)
- Pro Wrestling Illustrated
  - Ranked No. 119 of the top 500 singles wrestlers in the PWI 500 in 2011
- United Pro Wrestling Association
  - UPWA World Heavyweight Championship (1 time)
- WrestleSport
  - WrestleSport Heavyweight Championship (1 time)
