= FCW Florida Heavyweight Championship =

Professional wrestling championship

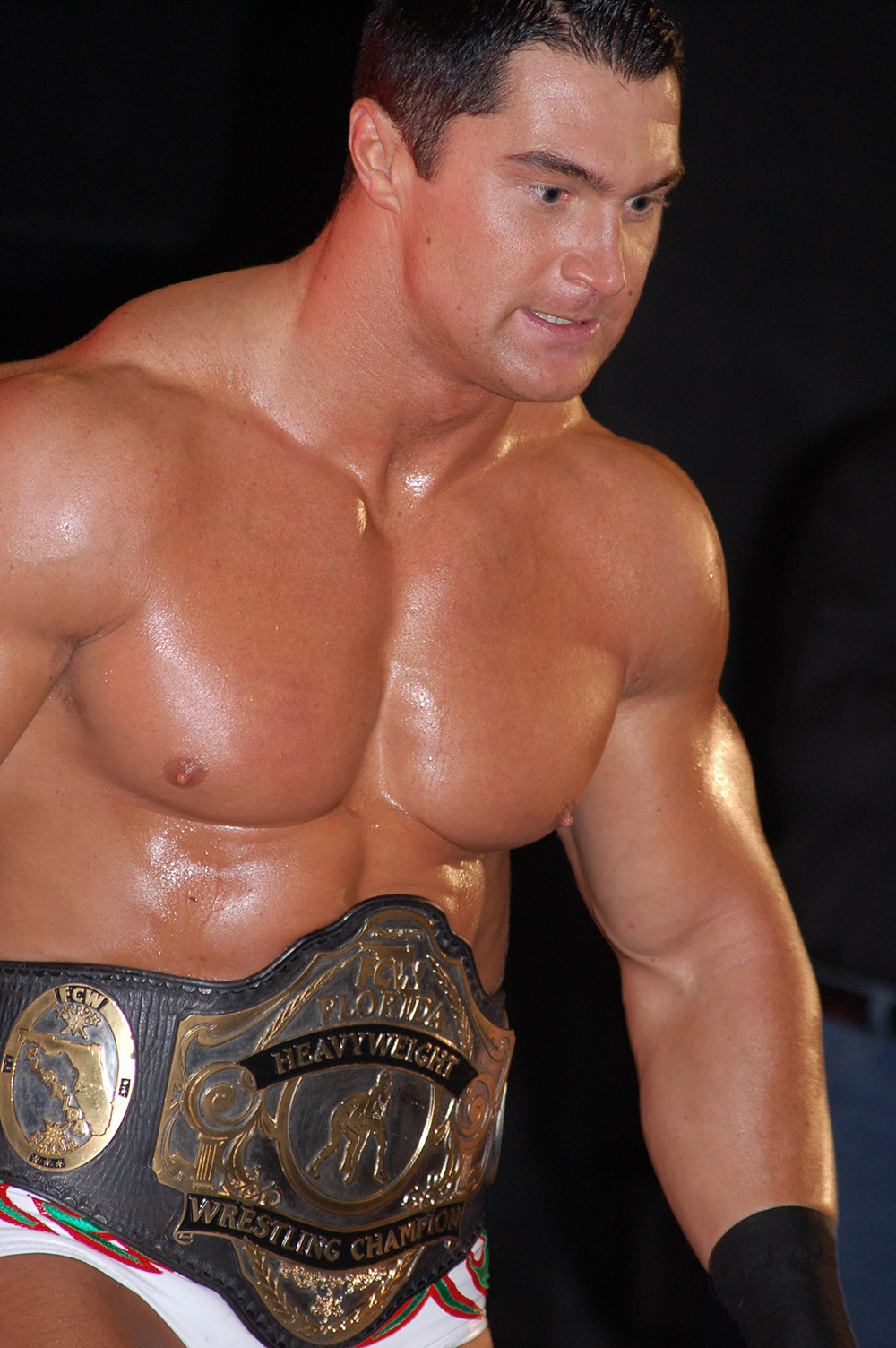
- Mason Ryan as champion in 2010

Details
- Promotion: Florida Championship Wrestling
- Date established: February 15, 2008
- Date retired: August 14, 2012
Statistics
- First champion: Jake Hager
- Final champion: Richie Steamboat
- Most reigns: Bo Rotundo/Dallas (3 times)
- Longest reign: Jake Hager (216 days)
- Shortest reign: Bo Rotundo, Rick Victor and Leo Kruger (<1 day)
- Oldest champion: Sheamus O'Shaunessy (30 years, 318 days)
- Youngest champion: Bo Rotundo (20 years, 254 days)
- Heaviest champion: Sheamus O'Shaunessy (290 lb (130 kg))
- Lightest champion: Mike Dalton (195 lb (88 kg))

The FCW Florida Heavyweight Championship was a professional wrestling heavyweight championship owned and promoted by Florida Championship Wrestling (FCW), a former developmental territory of WWE. It was contested for in their heavyweight division. The championship was created and debuted on February 15, 2008, at a FCW house show.

The first champion was Jake Hager who won a 23-man battle royal by defeating Ted DiBiase Jr. to become the first champion. On March 22, 2008, Hager defeated FCW Southern Heavyweight Champion Heath Miller to unify the two championships and retire the FCW Southern Heavyweight Championship. Bo Rotundo/Dallas holds the record for the most reigns with three reigns. Leo Kruger, Rick Victor and Bo Rotundo all hold the record for shortest reign, because all three have individually won and lost the title on the same day. Jake Hager holds the record for the longest reign (as an individual) with 216 days. In August 2012, the championship was retired when FCW was closed down and WWE created NXT as the new farm territory and replaced with the NXT Championship. The final champion was Richie Steamboat, who defeated Rick Victor to win the title.

== Reigns ==
Over the championship's four-year history, there have been 21 reigns between 17 champions. Jake Hager was the inaugural champion. Bo Dallas, formerly known as Bo Rotundo, holds the record for most reigns at three times. Hager's reign is the longest at 216 days, while Rick Victor's and Rotundo's first reigns and Leo Kruger's second reign lasted less than a day. Sheamus O'Shaunessy is the oldest champion at 30 years old, while Rotundo is the youngest at 20 years old.

Richie Steamboat was the final champion in his first reign. He won the title by defeating Victor on July 20, 2012, and held it for 25 days until FCW closed on August 14.

Key
No.	Overall reign number
Reign	Reign number for the specific champion
Days	Number of days held

No.	Champion	Championship change			Reign statistics		Notes	Ref.
No.	Champion	Date	Event	Location	Reign	Days	Notes	Ref.
1	Jake Hager	February 15, 2008	Live event	Tampa, FL	1	216	Hager defeated Ted DiBiase Jr. after both were the two remaining superstars in a 23-man battle royal. On March 22, 2008, Hager defeated FCW Southern Heavyweight Champion Heath Miller to unify the two championships and retire the FCW Southern Heavyweight Championship.	
2	Sheamus O'Shaunessy	September 18, 2008	Live event	Tampa, FL	1	84		
3	Eric Escobar	December 11, 2008	FCW	Tampa, FL	1	77	This was a Fatal Four-Way Match also including Drew McIntyre and Joe Hennig.	
4	Joe Hennig	February 26, 2009	FCW	Tampa, FL	1	21		
—	Vacated	March 19, 2009	—	—	—	—	Joe Hennig was forced to turn in his championship due to injury.	
5	Drew McIntyre	March 19, 2009	FCW	Tampa, FL	1	84	Defeated Eric Escobar to win the vacant championship.	
6	Tyler Reks	June 11, 2009	FCW	Tampa, FL	1	63		
7	Heath Miller	August 13, 2009	FCW	Tampa, FL	1	42		
8	Justin Angel	September 24, 2009	FCW	Tampa, FL	1	175	This was a two out of three falls match.	
9	Alex Riley	March 18, 2010	FCW	Tampa, FL	1	126	This was a three–way match, also involving Wade Barrett.	
10	Mason Ryan	July 22, 2010	FCW	Tampa, FL	1	196	This was a three–way match, also involving Johnny Curtis.	
11	Bo Rotundo	February 3, 2011	March of Champions	Tampa, FL	1	<1	Norman Smiley was the special guest referee.	
12	Lucky Cannon	February 3, 2011	March of Champions	Tampa, FL	1	105	Brett DiBiase was the special guest referee.	
13	Bo Rotundo	May 19, 2011	FCW	Tampa, FL	2	105	Brett DiBiase was the special guest referee.	
—	Vacated	September 1, 2011	FCW	Tampa, FL	—	—	The championship was vacated after Bo Rotundo was sidelined with an injury.	
14	Leo Kruger	September 1, 2011	FCW	Tampa, FL	1	154	This was a fatal–four-way match, also involving Damien Sandow, Dean Ambrose and Husky Harris.	
15	Mike Dalton	February 2, 2012	FCW	Tampa, FL	1	21		
16	Leo Kruger	February 23, 2012	FCW	Tampa, FL	2	<1		
17	Seth Rollins	February 23, 2012	FCW	Tampa, FL	1	98		
18	Rick Victor	May 31, 2012	Live event	Crystal River, FL	1	<1		
19	Bo Dallas	May 31, 2012	Live event	Crystal River, FL	3	43		
20	Rick Victor	July 13, 2012	Live event	Punta Gorda, FL	2	7		
21	Richie Steamboat	July 20, 2012	Live event	St. Augustine, FL	1	25		
—	Deactivated	August 14, 2012	—	Tampa, FL	—	—	Title retired when FCW closed down.	

== Combined reigns ==
Rank	Champion	No. of reigns	Combined days
1	Jake Hager	1	216
2	Mason Ryan	1	196
3	Justin Angel	1	175
4	Leo Kruger	2	154
5	Bo Dallas/Bo Rotundo	3	149
6	Alex Riley	1	126
7	Lucky Cannon	1	105
8	Seth Rollins	1	98
9	Sheamus O'Shaunessy	1	84
9	Drew McIntyre	1	84
11	Eric Escobar	1	77
12	Tyler Reks	1	63
13	Heath Miller	1	42
14	Richie Steamboat	1	25
15	Joe Hennig	1	21
15	Mike Dalton	1	21
17	Rick Victor	2	8
