= Eric Pérez =

Puerto Rican professional wrestler

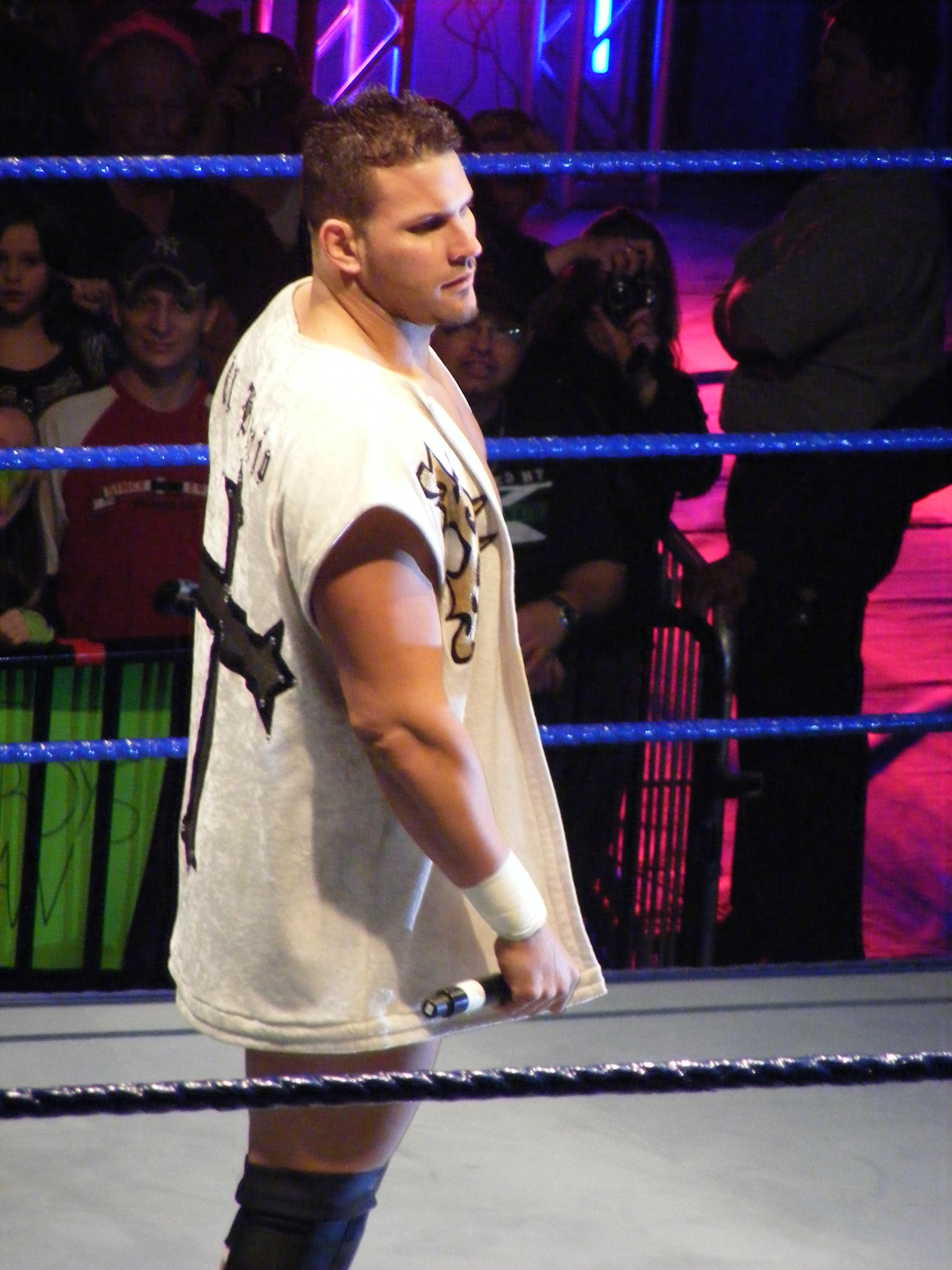
- Pérez in 2009

Personal information
- Born: Eric Alexander Pérez; December 18, 1979 (age 46) Carolina, Puerto Rico
- Spouse: Jeannette Concepción (m. 1997)
- Children: 3

Professional wrestling career
- Ring name(s): Eric Alexander; Eric El Gladiador; Eric Escobar; Mr. Escobar; Eric Pérez; Escobar; Mr. E
- Billed height: 6 ft 3 in (1.91 m)
- Billed weight: 250 lb (110 kg)
- Billed from: San Juan, Puerto Rico
- Trained by: Super Crazy
- Debut: 2000

Eric Alexander Pérez (born December 18, 1979) is a Puerto Rican professional wrestler who currently performs under the ring name Escobar. In 2005, Pérez signed a developmental contract with World Wrestling Entertainment (WWE), where he worked for developmental territories Deep South Wrestling and Florida Championship Wrestling, winning the tag team championship in both and the FCW Florida Heavyweight Championship. In the fall of 2009, he was promoted to WWE's main roster as Eric Escobar, appearing on the SmackDown brand. On January 17, 2010, he was released from his WWE contract. Pérez subsequently returned to Puerto Rico, performing in the IWA and Puerto Rico Wrestling Association, winning the heavyweight titles of both promotions.

== Professional wrestling career ==
=== International Wrestling Association and World Wrestling Council (2000–2005) ===
Pérez began his career in the International Wrestling Association in Puerto Rico, after receiving training with personnel from the company. Prior to debuting in professional wrestling Pérez had always had an interest in wrestling fueled by World Wrestling Entertainment and Gorgeous Ladies of Wrestling. Pérez also stated that during his career he was inspired by the microphone skills of Chicky Starr and The Rock and by the in-ring ability of Kurt Angle. While visiting an event presented by the IWA in Carolina, Puerto Rico, Pérez was approached by Víctor Quiñones then president of the company, who asked to him if he was interested in receiving training to become a professional wrestler. His first angle with the company was as the leader of a group of young wrestlers titled Lucha Libre 101, originally composed of Bryan Madness (Roberto Rubio), Chicano (Carlos Cotto) and Abbad (Enrique Sinigaglia). Several of the members of Lucha Libre 101 were either injured or abandoned the company while it was in progress which led to it being cancelled. After the company terminated this angle he acted as host of a talk show segment, but he was not interested in the section and asked the company to give the role to Daniel Garcia Soto while he traveled to Mexico.

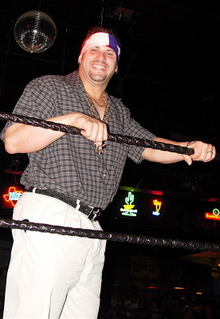
Eric Pérez at an FCW show in Ft. Myers, Florida

While working in the IWA, Pérez acquired a job to work with the Federal Government of the United States, this limited the number of days he could perform with the company, after seven months in this office he notified that he was not going to be able to continue working a four-day schedule, and attempted to dialogue the situation with the company's personnel. He was not able to contact staff of the company which led to him asking for a release, several months later a fellow wrestler called him and asked if he was available to work with the World Wrestling Council which led to a reunion between him and the company's vice president Carlos Colón, Sr. He noted in interviews that his experience with the company was good, although it was a long and tedious one based on the company's quality standards. While in IWA, Pérez wrestled in the United States with !Bang! a promotion owned by Dory Funk Jr., against wrestlers including Brent Dail and several of !Bang!'s champions. He subsequently worked with the World Wrestling Council, winning various titles there.

=== World Wrestling Entertainment (2005–2010) ===
==== Deep South Wrestling (2005–2007) ====
During September 2005, Pérez was contacted by World Wrestling Entertainment (WWE) for a development contract. He was assigned to their developmental territory, Deep South Wrestling and began working under the pseudonym "The Puerto Rican Nightmare" Eric Pérez. During his time there, he wrestled in singles matches, in addition to teaming with Montel Vontavious Porter and later, Sonny Siaki with whom he formed the tag team, Urban Assault. The team won the Deep South Tag Team Championship once before the company finished its business relationship with WWE. On May 1, 2006, Pérez competed in a tag team match at his first WWE house show. He would then appear at ECW house shows in late July and again on September 30. Alongside Siaki, he started wrestling on Raw house shows in February 2007.

==== Florida Championship Wrestling (2007–2009) ====
After Deep South Wrestling ended their working relationship with WWE, he was transferred to Florida Championship Wrestling, where he continued performing as a developmental talent. Pérez was subjected to surgery in October 2007, after sustaining an injury on his back, prompting several months of inactivity while in recovery. Pérez returned to action in January 2008, and continued his participation in the promotion. On January 26, 2008, he participated in a battle royal to determine the number one contender for the FCW Southern Heavyweight Championship. Pérez won the tournament after eliminating the final contender with the help of Eddie Colón.

On February 23, 2008, Pérez and Colón, collectively known as The Puerto Rican Nightmares, defeated Steven Lewington and Heath Miller in a tournament final to become the first-ever FCW Florida Tag Team Champions. The team lost the titles to Brad Allen and Nick Nemeth on March 23, 2008, before winning them back via disqualification on April 15, 2008. They lost the titles to Drew McIntyre and Stu Sanders on May 6, 2008. On July 17, Pérez and Colón reclaimed their titles by defeating McIntyre and Sanders. They later lost the titles to Nic Nemeth and Gavin Spears on August 16, 2008, when Colón was promoted to the main brands. Less than a month later, on September 15, Pérez performed in a dark match prior to Raw, defeating Gene Snitsky by pinfall. The following week, on September 22, he performed against Tommy Dreamer prior to the WWE SmackDown tapings.

On December 11, Pérez won the FCW Florida Heavyweight Championship, defeating Sheamus O'Shaunessy, Joe Hennig and Drew McIntyre in a fatal four-way match. The following month, FCW's creative team changed his ring name to "Eric Escobar". During the following months, while still holding the title, Pérez performed on several dark matches prior to the tapings of WWE's main brands, working under his developmental ring name. On February 17, 2009, he wrestled against Jimmy Wang Yang before SmackDown. A couple of weeks later, Pérez performed a sketch in Spanish, deeming himself the future talent of WWE, subsequently defeating Kizarny. On February 26, 2009, he was booked to lose the championship against Hennig. He continued working with Yang on subsequent dates, performing jobs on March 17, 2009, prior to SmackDown's 500th episode, the August 3 edition of WWE Superstars and the August 4 edition of SmackDown. Pérez then entered a feud with Santino Marella during one of WWE's Latin American tours, trading victories.

==== SmackDown (2009–2010) ====
As his promotion to the main roster approached, a character based on Jonathan Goldsmith’s The Most Interesting Man in the World was pitched for Pérez by writer Jenn Bloodsworth, vignettes for it were recorded but the concept was ultimately abandoned. On September 28, 2009, he performed in his last dark match against Primo, losing by pinfall. The following night, Pérez made his debut on the main roster under the ring name Eric Escobar. He was placed in an angle with Vickie Guerrero and performing as a villainous character, during the tapings of SmackDown's tenth anniversary show. In his in-ring debut, he defeated Matt Hardy by pinfall, receiving a spot in the brand's team for the first edition of WWE Bragging Rights. In his debut for WWE Superstars, he was teamed with Drew McIntyre being placed over the tag team of Hardy and R-Truth. On October 23, 2009, Escobar was one of five wrestlers removed from Team SmackDown of Bragging Rights. Escobar was included in his first and only championship match in WWE on November 27, 2009, losing to John Morrison for the WWE Intercontinental Championship. The angle with Guerrero was ended in a skit that featured a spot where she yelled at him and slapped him in the face, prompting a physical confrontation between both characters, which ultimately ended with Escobar turning into a face character.

During his face run, Escobar was punished by Guerrero, who put Escobar in handicap matches against the Hart Dynasty (David Hart Smith and Tyson Kidd) and Jeri-Show (Chris Jericho and Big Show). On December 18, Escobar wrestled in his final WWE match, losing to Kane in what was another punishment for Escobar by Guerrero. On January 17, 2010, Pérez was released from his WWE contract.

=== Independent circuit (2010–2012) ===
Consequently, Pérez returned to the World Wrestling Council on January 30, 2010, working under the ringname "Mr. Escobar". This character was based on his previous WWE gimmick. He was immediately booked in a feud with Ray González and Black Pain, forming a tag team with Orlando Colón. After Orlando left the promotion to work in FCW, he was inactive in WWC. During this timeframe, Pérez worked dates in Florida including his debut in American Combat Wrestling defeating ACW Kombat Champion Kennedy Kendrick. He would later go on to work for Combat Championship Wrestling in Florida. He returned to the World Wrestling Council in their annual event, "Camino a la Gloria", where he was included in a feud with BJ (Benjamín Jiménez). On April 24, 2010, he participated in an inconclusive Three Way Dance to determine the number one contender for the Universal Championship. On May 29, 2010, Pérez was involved in an incident, responding to physical provocation by slapping a member of the audience. Following this event, he remained inactive within the promotion.

On December 5, 2010 at Xmas in PR along with Roberto Rubio, Peréz made his return to IWA to attack the IWA World Heavyweight Champion Dennis Rivera to which apply an Sky High. On January 6, 2011 at Histeria Boricua Perez challenged Rivera for the Undisputed World Heavyweight Championship which Pérez won the championship for first time. Throughout the first three months of 2011, he entered a feud with Tua. The angle came to an end at Juicio Final, where he dropped the championship. Pérez remained off screen for several months following this show, occasionally posting updates in the IWA's Facebook fan page. In August 2011 he made his final appearance in this run on the promotion, cutting a heel promo criticizing the public. After leaving the IWA due to unspecified monetary differences in the fall of 2011, he joined the Puerto Rico Wrestling Alliance, a regional independent promotion. As Escobar he went on to win the PRWA World Heavyweight Championship on December 17, 2011, defeating Richard Young. In March 2012, Pérez retained over Michael Tarver. On May 26, 2012, he dropped the championship in a four-way match that also involved Matt Hardy.

=== World Wrestling League (2013–2015) ===
In January 2013, Pérez was reintroduced by Hugo Savinovich as "Mr. E", reforming his team with Rubio and performing as one of the main talents in the World Wrestling League, a promotion based in Puerto Rico. Rebranded with a Latin lover gimmick and now known as "Los Mamitos", they were given a first feud against Los Mega 10, a team formed by Wrestling Alliance Revolution (Ecuador) and Revolution X-Treme Wrestling (Panama) champions, Panama Jack Daniels 10 and El Mega Star. Their first encounter took place at Idols of Wrestling, concluding in a double disqualification when both team exited the arena and continued brawling. The company's management was responsible for employing the WWL's association with Lucha Libre AAA Worldwide to book the team in a four-way match for the AAA World Tag Team Championship at Triplemanía XXI, where they eliminated Jack Evans and Angélico before being eliminated themselves. After the event, Los Mamitos were involved in the first stage of a feud against Los Perros del Mal.

Los Mamitos making their entrance in WWL's debut show

Next was another four-way elimination contest to crown the first WWL World Tag Team Champions, where they defeated the teams of Eita and Tomahawk, El Hijo de Kato Kung Lee and Vengador Radioactivo, and Heddi Karaoui & Zumbi in a four-way match. Former AAA World Heavyweight Champion Dr. Wagner, Jr. and his son, Hijo de Dr. Wagner, were originally scheduled to be in the match, but failed to attend the event without offering an explanation. On September 6, 2013, Los Mamitos defended their titles by defeating the AAA World Tag Team Champions, The Mexican Powers (Crazy Boy and Joe Líder). Two days later, the team lost to Germán Figueroa and Joe "Hercules" Gómez in a three-way that also included The Mexican Powers. However, since Pérez had his boot in the ropes while the referee counted, WWL General Manager Rico Casanova ruled that the World Tag Team Championship could not change hands. On March 7, 2014, Los Mamitos retained the titles against La Dinastía Máscaras (Sicodelico, Jr. and Hijo de Dos Caras), when Rubio unmasked Sicodelico, Jr. and employed the distraction to score the pin. The teams met in a rematch two days later, wrestling to a double count-out. On October 18, 2014, at Insurrection, Los Mamitos lost the titles against Thunder and Lightning. While the two promotions were involved in a working agreement, Pérez made appearances in WWC, where he performed under a mask as a character known as "The Alien" and was assigned José Huertas González as manager.

Rubio suffered an injury and while he recovered, Pérez reverted to his former ringname of Escobar and was involved in an angle where he was portrayed as mentally unstable. On January 6, 2015, Pérez participated in the creation of heel faction The Gentlemen's Club. Despite being joined by a returning Rubio, the Los Mamitos gimmick was dropped and both reverted to their previous ringnames. The group then entered into a feud with a group known as La Rabia led by Dennis Rivera and won a trios match the following month at Rebelión En El Sur. On March 21, 2015, Perez participated in the International Cup tournament and defeated Shane Sewell in the final to win the eponymous trophy. Prior to this, he had advanced by defeating a cruiserweight wrestler in the opening round and Roger Díaz in the semifinal.

On August 16, 2015, Pérez participated in Sin Piedad but did not wrestle, instead attacking IWRG Rey del Ring Ricky Cruz and taking that title with him. Later on the same event, he counseled "Wonderful" Xander (Alexander Ortiz) and joined the rest of the Gentlemen's Club in a turn against Negrín. At Wrestlefest, Cruz won the first encounter between both by convincing the referee that a foreign object had been used, but Pérez retained possession of the title. In this event he formed an alliance with Hijo de Dos Caras and recruited Xander for unspecified reasons.

== Personal life ==
On August 7, 2012, Pérez and his wife Jeannette Concepción became the parents of triplets. Dylan Alexander Pérez Concepción, Derek Alexander Pérez Concepción and Christopher Alexander Pérez Concepción were born in San Juan, Puerto Rico.

== Championships and accomplishments ==
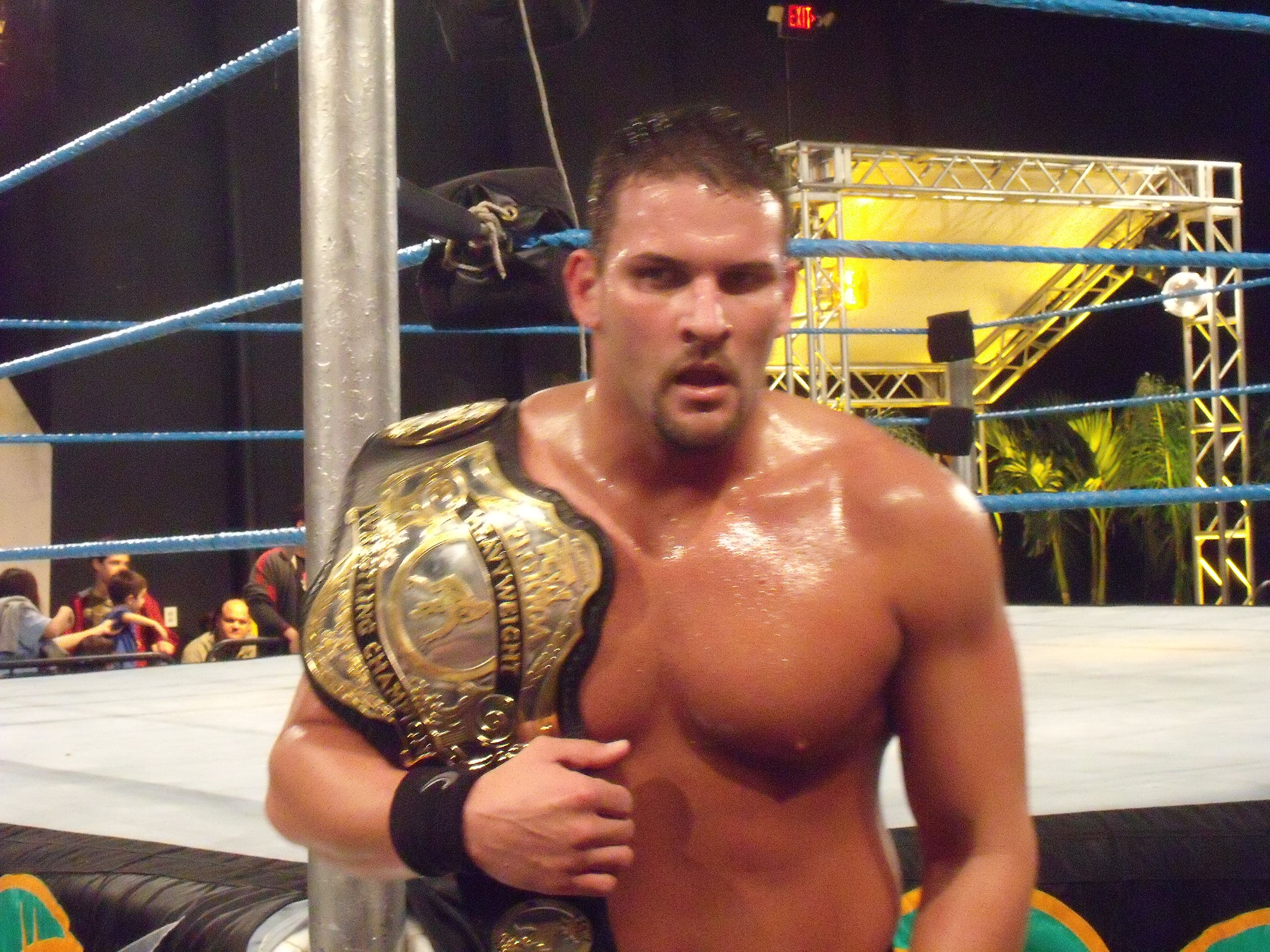
Pérez as FCW Florida Heavyweight Champion.

- Deep South Wrestling
  - Deep South Tag Team Championship (1 time) – with Sonny Siaki
- Florida Championship Wrestling
  - FCW Florida Heavyweight Championship (1 time)
  - Florida Tag Team Championship (3 times, inaugural) – with Eddie Colón
- International Wrestling Association
  - IWA Undisputed World Heavyweight Championship (1 time)
  - IWA Intercontinental Championship (1 time)
  - IWA World Tag Team Championship (3 times) – with Andy Anderson (1) and Craven (2)
  - IWA Hardcore Championship (4 times)
- Puerto Rico Wrestling Alliance
  - PRWA World Heavyweight Championship (1 time)
- World Wrestling Council
  - WWC Puerto Rico Heavyweight Championship (1 time)
  - WWC World Tag Team Championship (1 time) – with Rico Suave
- World Wrestling League
  - WWL World Tag Team Championship (4 times) – with Sexy B (2) and Wonderful Xander (2)
  - WWL International Cup (2015)
- Pro Wrestling Illustrated
  - PWI ranked him #216 of the top 500 singles wrestlers in the PWI 500 in 2011

== See also ==
- Professional wrestling in Puerto Rico
