= Lake Norman High School =

American public school in North Carolina

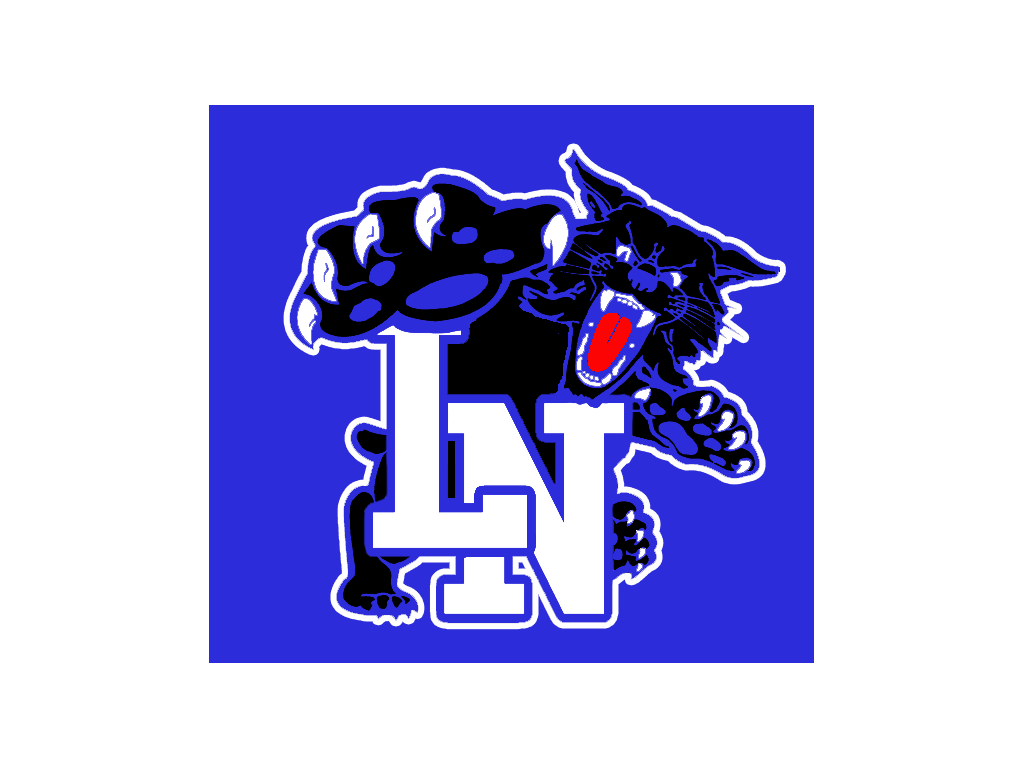

Location
- 186 Doolie Road; Mooresville, North Carolina 28117; United States; 35°35′49″N 80°54′06″W

Information
- Type: Public
- Motto: Excellence is our tradition
- Established: 2002 (24 years ago)
- CEEB code: 342691
- Principal: Nicholas Allen
- Teaching staff: 83.87 (FTE)
- Enrollment: 1,905 (2024–2025)
- Student to teacher ratio: 22.71
- Colors: Midnight blue, black, and white
- Athletics: Baseball, cheerleading, cross country, diving, football, golf, lacrosse, soccer, softball, swimming, tennis, track, volleyball, wrestling
- Athletics conference: North Piedmont 6A/7A
- Team name: Wildcats
- Website: lakenormanhigh.issnc.org

Lake Norman High School is located in Mooresville, North Carolina. The school is a part of the Iredell-Statesville school system. The name of the school comes from nearby Lake Norman. In 2009, Lake Norman High School had the highest graduation rate of North Carolina public non-charter schools, with 95% of the senior class receiving a diploma. In June 2012, Lake Norman High School was recognized as a National Blue Ribbon Schools Program School of Excellence.

== Enrollment ==
As of August 2024, Lake Norman High has over 1,981 students. In 2006, a new wing was added on to the school as the Freshmen Academy.

== Athletics ==
Lake Norman High has sports teams that compete in soccer, tennis, golf, basketball, swimming, cross-country, track and field, lacrosse, football, wrestling, baseball, volleyball, softball, and cheerleading.

The school has won state championships in cheerleading (2002, 2003, 2004, 2005, 2006, 2017, 2019, 2020, 2021, 2022, 2023, 2024), women's lacrosse (2015), men's lacrosse (2012, 2018), men's soccer (2006, 2007), men's tennis (2009), baseball (2009), women's basketball (2025), men's basketball (2010), and men's swimming (2009). Individual state championships have been won in wrestling, women's tennis, and men's and women's swimming.

The school competes in the North Piedmont 6A/7A Conference which includes: Lake Norman (7A); Mooresville (7A); South Iredell (7A); Davie County (7A); Statesville (6A); North Iredell (6A)

== Arts ==
Lake Norman High School has multiple art shows a year, chorus concerts, band proformances, and drama plays. All the different arts at the school have competitions where their art can be auditioned and moved on or perform in certain groups such as District Competitions and All State. The school supports the multi-discipline Spring Musical. LNHS has a competitive show choir, "Showformance".

== Notable alumni ==
- Tyler Ankrum, stock car racing driver
- Richard Blood Jr., professional wrestler
- Nick Drake, stock car racing driver
- Brandon Jones, stock car racing driver
- J.B. Mauney, bull rider, 2x Professional Bull Riders (PBR) World Champion, member of the PBR Ring of Honor
