= Liloy National High School =

Public high school in Zamboanga del Norte, Philippines

Location
- National Highway; Liloy, Zamboanga del Norte; Philippines; 8°7′21″N 122°40′20″E

Information
- Type: Public High School
- Established: July 1, 1974
- Oversight: Zamboanga del Norte Division
- Principal: Naida S. Mercado, Principal II
- Enrollment: Approximately 4,009 Students (S.Y. 2020-2021)
- Campus: Urban
- Newspaper: The Dazzle (Ang Silaw)

The Liloy National High School is a Public High School located in National Highway, Liloy, Zamboanga del Norte, Philippines. It was founded on July 1, 1974, and nationalized in July 1987. It's also the biggest school in the province of Zamboanga del Norte in terms of students and teachers population with greater distinctions.

== History ==
Liloy National High School was established on July 1, 1974, at the D.E. defunct, Baybay, Liloy, Zamboanga del Norte. During the first year of operation, the total population was 135 first year and 54 second year students with a total of 189 students, and four teachers. During the second year of operation, the school offered a complete high school curriculum, this time with 840 students with 12 teachers under the supervision of the school principal of Baybay Central School. In September 1979, it was converted to Liloy Municipal High School.

In July 1987, the school was converted and nationalized, later called Liloy National High School, and at the same time transferred to the uptown area of the town which is nearer to the Municipal Hall. These were all through the efforts of the local officials who also bought the school site, with an area of 40,000 square meters for ₱40,000, registered under the name of the Department of Education. Presently, the total population of the school has rose to 2,580 students with more than 80 regular permanent teachers, 1 senior book-keeper and 1 school clerk with permanent status as reflected in the PSIPOP, managed and supervised by the principal.

Another piece of land with an area of 1,071.77 square meters adjacent to the school site was bought for ₱38,000. Liloy National High School has a total of 12 buildings with a 2-story ESF building which additionally serves as the administration building.

== Campus ==
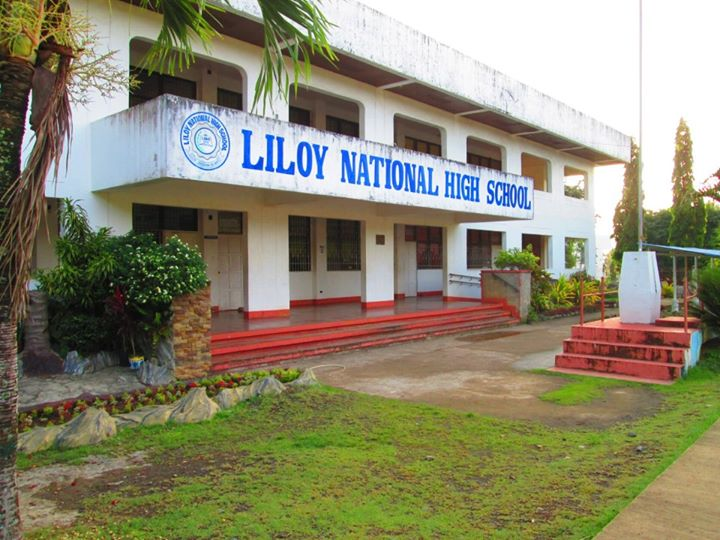
The Liloy National High School 2-story ESF Building.

Liloy National High School previously had three campuses, the main campus, another campus in Compra which is in the southern part of the town and is now a separate high school with the official name of Compra National High School, and in Patawag.

The main campus has a total land area of four hectares. A mini-forest with a naturally grown trees is found at the back of the school. There are a total of eight parks around the whole campus. The school houses a computer lab, science lab and library.

The classroom sections of the campus were officially changed, effective in June 2012, relating to color (grade 7), flowers (grade 8), elements (grade 9), and precious stones (grade 10), Examples may vary: Red, Blue, Camillia (or Camilia), Hyacinth, Oxygen, Hydrogen, Pearl, Jade, and Sapphire. The four ESEP sections are: 7-Armstrong (Grade 7), 8-Mendel (Grade 8), 9-Einstein (Grade 9), 10-Newton (Grade 10).

The Administration Building, or ESF building has two stories.

First story

- The Guidance Counselor's Section
- T.L.E Lab Section
- Science Laboratory
- Grade 8 - Mendel Classroom (ESEP)
- Grade 7 - Armstrong Classroom (ESEP)
- Band Equipment Section

Second story

- Principal's Office
- Library
- Computer Laboratory
- Finance and Management Section
- Grade 9 - Einstein Classroom (ESEP)
- Grade 10 - Newton Classroom (ESEP)

The school's canteen is also located near the school's entrance gate.

The Communication of Arts Festival was once held on the campus.

== School Paper ==
The school has two publications, The Dazzle and Ang Silaw, in English and in Filipino respectively.
