= Labogon National High School =

Public high school in Mandaue, Philippines

- Preparing students for the brighter future.

Location
- Mandaue City, Cebu; Philippines
- Coordinates: 10°21′03″N 123°57′31″E

Information
- Type: Public, College Preparatory School
- Established: 1999
- Principal: Mr. Fernando V. Ylaya
- Grades: JHS: 7 to 10; SHS: 11 to 12
- Campus: Sto. Niño, Labogon, Mandaue City
- Colors: Blue and White
- Affiliation: Department of Education
- School Paper Publication: Ang Bukana
- School ID: 303200
- Website: www.labogonnhs.com

Labogon National High School is an academic institution under the public school system of the Republic of the Philippines. The school started its operation in 1999 with one freshmen and one sophomore section. The enrollment rate grows to as much as 5% per year. As of 2012, the school serves more than a thousand students with the aid of its 28 full-time faculty members.

== History ==
The surging number of the younger population of barangay Labogon resonated to the needs of establishing a secondary school that is able to address the local community’s demands for education. Answering the problem, the City Council of Mandaue through its thrust made a resolution for the creation of Labogon National High School.

Construction for the new school started in 1998 with a floor plan of 12 Classrooms. A year later the school started its operation even though construction is still ongoing and only three classrooms are functional. The history of Labogon National High School then started to unfold in the year 1999.

During its first year of operation, Labogon National High School accepted students for first year and second year classes and consequently, for the next two years, third year and fourth year classes were offered. In 2002, the school produced its first set of graduates and on the same year the school boasts more than four hundred students. The student population grows to as much as 5% per year.

Being one of the newly founded schools in Mandaue, it is building its name in the fields of academics, sports, and other co-curricular activities.
