= Steven Lewington =

English professional wrestler (born 1983)

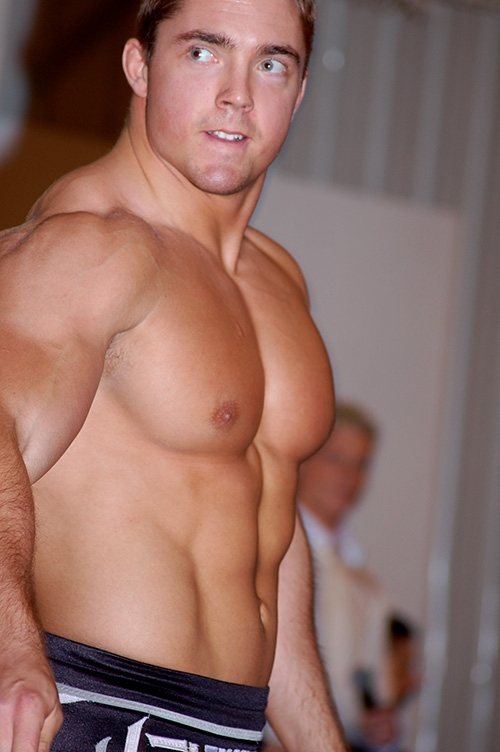
- Lewington in Hodgenville, Kentucky in February 2007

Personal information
- Born: Steven Paul Lewingston; 25 February 1983 (age 43) Wokingham, Berkshire, England

Professional wrestling career
- Ring name(s): Bronson; DJ Gabriel; Gabriel; Jack Gabriel; Mr. FCW; Steve Lewington; Steve Sonic
- Billed height: 5 ft 8 in (1.73 m)
- Billed weight: 174 lb (79 kg; 12.4 st)
- Billed from: Wokingham, Berkshire, England; Preston, England
- Debut: 2004
- Retired: 2010

Steven Paul Lewington (born 25 February 1983) is an English retired professional wrestler. He is best known for his time in World Wrestling Entertainment, where he performed under the ring name DJ Gabriel on the ECW brand. Lewington then wrestled independently as "The Swole-verine" Bronson.

== Professional wrestling career ==
=== All Star Wrestling and Ohio Valley Wrestling (2003–2005) ===
After graduating from Senior School Sixth Form at the Forest School Winnersh, Lewington attended Farnborough College of Technology where he earned a Higher National Diploma in Aeronautical Engineering.

After developing an interest in professional wrestling, however, Lewington applied and was accepted to attend an Ohio Valley Wrestling (OVW) tryout in America between 23 and 28 February 2003. Lewington's official training began 8 months later in the beginners' class at the Old Davis arena.

Lewington would return to England in late 2004 where he would work with All Star Wrestling. Throughout early 2005, Lewington would train and appear with ASW as well as becoming the subject of an episode of UKTV People's Secret Life of the Gym.

=== World Wrestling Entertainment (2005–2010) ===
While WWE was touring England in 2005, Lewington would make three appearances on its main programming, once as a jobber on Carlito's Cabana interview segment, again as a jobber to Kurt Angle after Angle disrespected England and once as part of the WWE security squad that helped keep the warring Raw and SmackDown! wrestlers apart. Other British wrestlers including Robbie Brookside and Thunder were a part of the security team.

After his appearances in WWE programming in 2005, Lewington stayed in the United Kingdom to compete for the All Star Wrestling (ASW) promotion, under the ring name Steve Sonic. On 17 January 2006 in Croydon, Sonic faced Drew McDonald in a ladder match for the ASW British Heavyweight Championship, and won. Sonic would remain champion for several months before relinquishing the title to return to WWE's developmental promotion in July 2006.

==== Developmental territories (2006–2008) ====
During April 2006, WWE would once again tour England allowing Lewington to make another appearance on Raw on 24 April, losing to Umaga. His performance in this match would earn Lewington a developmental deal. After receiving his contract, Lewington was sent to OVW and formed a tag team called "Terminal Velocity" with Chet the Jett. After Florida Championship Wrestling (FCW) opened, however, Terminal Velocity was moved down to the new territory. After a brief run in FCW, Terminal Velocity was called back up to OVW and won the OVW Southern Tag Team Championship for the first time, giving Lewington the first tag team championship of his career. On 26 September 2007, Lewington and Chet lost the championship to The James Boys (KC James and Kassidy James). After their title loss, both members of Terminal Velocity were moved back down to FCW. After their return to FCW, however, Terminal Velocity split up when Chet renamed himself Mariouz Jablonski and developed an in-ring persona based on his Polish ancestry.

Lewington later began teaming with Heath Miller and both advanced to the finals of a tournament to crown the inaugural FCW Florida Tag Team Champions, but they were defeated by The Puerto Rican Nightmares (Eddie Colón and Eric Pérez). Lewington and Miller defeated Brandon Groom and Greg Jackson and The Thoroughbreds (Johnny Curtis and Kevin Kiley) en route to the finals. On 4 March 2008 he changed his name to "Jack Gabriel".

==== ECW (2008–2009) ====
On 18 November 2008, Lewington made his debut as a face in ECW, under the ring name "DJ Gabriel", with a dancing persona, and was managed by Alicia Fox. He defeated local wrestler Sal Rinauro in his debut match for the brand. Over the next weeks, he defeated several jobbers, before defeating Paul Burchill on the last episode of ECW in 2008. On 13 January 2009 episode of ECW, Gabriel and Fox defeated The Burchills, Paul and Katie Lea, in a mixed tag team match. On 24 February, Lewington suffered his ECW first loss since coming to the brand against Mark Henry. Several weeks later Gabriel lost to Tyson Kidd in a singles match, which was his last televised match on the brand. On 15 April 2009, Fox returned to the SmackDown brand as a part of the 2009 Supplemental Draft, leaving Gabriel on his own.

==== Departure (2009–2010) ====
After Fox returned to SmackDown, Lewington was sent back to FCW and developed a new character of a "true British man", while his ring name was tweaked to simply Gabriel. After losing a match and, in storyline, being suspended from FCW, Lewington then began wrestling under a mask as Mr. FCW. Lewington would eventually "win" back his place on the FCW roster, and would alternate between his Gabriel and Mr. FCW characters before being released from his contract in January 2010.

=== Independent circuit (2010) ===
After leaving WWE, Lewington continued the DJ Gabriel gimmick working for American Combat Wrestling in Florida from March to April 2010. He retired afterwards.

== Championships and accomplishments ==
- All Star Wrestling
  - ASW British Heavyweight Championship (1 time)
- Ohio Valley Wrestling
  - OVW Southern Tag Team Championship (1 time) – with Chet the Jet
- Pro Wrestling Illustrated
  - PWI ranked him #358 of the top 500 singles wrestlers in the PWI 500 in 2008
