= FCW Southern Heavyweight Championship =

Professional wrestling championship

Details
- Promotion: Florida Championship Wrestling
- Date established: June 26, 2007
- Date retired: March 22, 2008
Statistics
- First champion(s): Harry Smith
- Most reigns: all titleholders (1 reign)
- Longest reign: Harry Smith (112 days)
- Shortest reign: Jake Hager (unification, >1 day)
- Oldest champion: TJ Wilson (27 years, 143 days)
- Youngest champion: Harry Smith (21 years, 328 days)
- Heaviest champion: Afa, Jr. (290 lb (130 kg))
- Lightest champion: TJ Wilson (199 lb (90 kg))

The FCW Southern Heavyweight Championship was a professional wrestling heavyweight championship owned and promoted by Florida Championship Wrestling (FCW, now known as NXT Wrestling), the developmental territory of WWE. It was contested for in their heavyweight division. The championship was created and debuted on June 26, 2007 at a FCW house show.

Harry Smith became the inaugural champion by winning a 21-man battle royal. The title was retired on March 22, 2008, after being unified with the FCW Florida Heavyweight Championship.

== Reigns ==
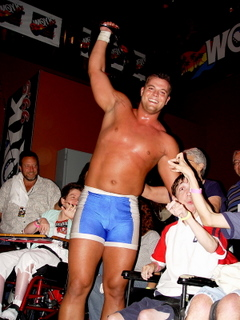
The inaugural champion Harry Smith

Over the championship's eight-month history, there have been six reigns between six champions. Harry Smith was the inaugural champion. Smith's reign is the longest at 112 days, while Jake Hager's reign was the shortest, which lasted less than a day. TJ Wilson is the oldest champion at 27 years old, while Smith is the youngest at 21 years old.

Hager was the final champion in his first reign. He won the title by defeating Heath Miller on March 22, 2008, and on the same day, it was retired upon it being unified with the Florida Heavyweight Championship.

Key
No.	Overall reign number
Reign	Reign number for the specific champion
Days	Number of days held
<1	Reign lasted less than a day

No.	Champion	Championship change			Reign statistics		Notes	Ref.
No.	Champion	Date	Event	Location	Reign	Days	Notes	Ref.
1	Harry Smith	June 26, 2007	Live event	Tampa, FL	1	112	Won a 21-man battle royal to become the inaugural champion.	
2	Afa Jr.	October 16, 2007	Live event	New Port Richey, FL	1	46	Declared winner when Harry Smith could not make referee's ten count.	
3	TJ Wilson	December 1, 2007	Live event	New Port Richey, FL	1	17	This was a ladder match.	
4	Ted DiBiase Jr.	December 18, 2007	Live event	New Port Richey, FL	1	32		
5	Heath Miller	January 19, 2008	Live event	New Port Richey, FL	1	63	Awarded the championship when partner Ted DiBiase Jr. was unable to defend it due to injury.	
6	Jake Hager	March 22, 2008	Live event	New Port Richey, FL	1	<1	Florida Heavyweight Champion Hager defeated Heath Miller in a unification match to unify the two championships.	
—	Deactivated	March 22, 2008	Live event	New Port Richey, FL	—	—	Retired immediately after being unified with Florida Heavyweight Championship.	
