= Gabbi Tuft =

American professional wrestler

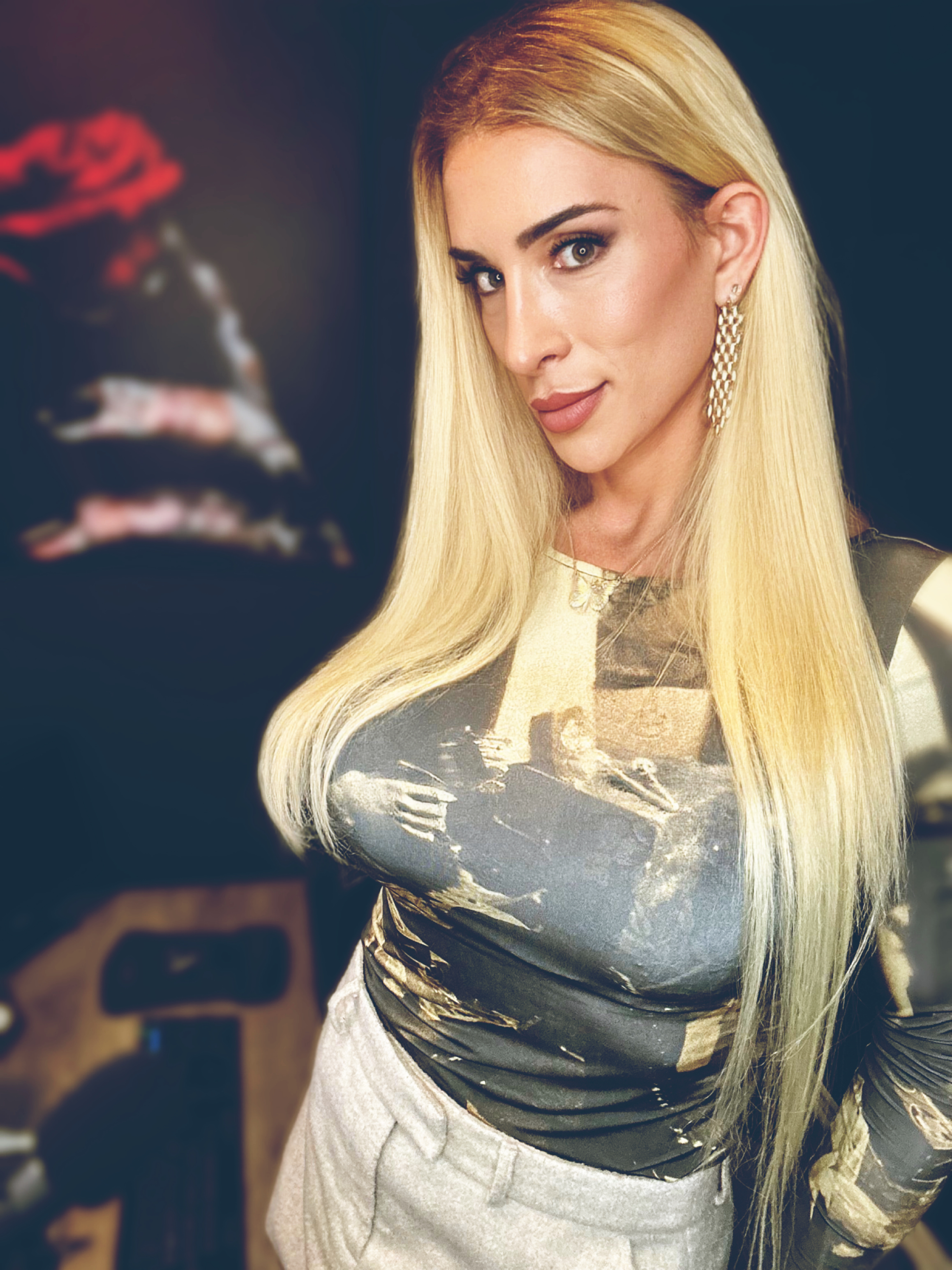
- Tuft in 2023

Personal information
- Born: November 1, 1978 (age 47) San Francisco, California, U.S.
- Spouse: Priscilla Tuft (m. 2002; sep. 2021)
- Children: 1

Professional wrestling career
- Ring name(s): Gabe Tuft; Taj Milano; Tyler Reks; Mother
- Billed height: 6 ft 2 in (188 cm)
- Billed weight: 246 lb (112 kg)
- Billed from: Parts Unknown; Laguna Beach, California
- Trained by: Ultimate Pro Wrestling; Florida Championship Wrestling
- Debut: February 2007
- Retired: 2014

Gabbi Alon Tuft (born November 1, 1978) is an American former professional wrestler. Tuft is best known for her time with WWE under the ring name Tyler Reks. Tuft also competed in WWE's developmental territory Florida Championship Wrestling (FCW), where she won the FCW Florida Heavyweight Championship once and the FCW Florida Tag Team Championship twice, once with Joe Hennig and once with Johnny Curtis.

Since retiring from professional wrestling in 2014, Tuft has been working in marketing. She also launched a fitness website with several other wrestlers. Tuft publicly came out as a trans woman in February 2021.

== Professional wrestling career ==
=== Independent circuit (2007–2008) ===
Tuft made her professional debut in February 2007 for Ultimate Pro Wrestling.

=== World Wrestling Entertainment/WWE ===
==== Florida Championship Wrestling (2008–2009) ====
Tuft was signed to a developmental contract with World Wrestling Entertainment in January 2008 and was assigned to the Florida Championship Wrestling development territory. She made her FCW debut on February 5, 2008, with Johnny Curtis in a losing effort against The Puerto Rican Nightmares (Eddie Colon and Eric Pérez). A few days later on February 12, she made her singles FCW debut, losing to "The South City Thriller" Hade Vansen. She participated in a FCW Florida Heavyweight Title Battle Royal, which was won by Jake Hager. She also took part in the FCW Florida Tag Team Title Tournament with Rycklon. During this tournament, she had her first victory at FCW defeating Ted DiBiase Jr. and Afa Jr. in the first round, however the pair subsequently lost to The Puerto Rican Nightmares in the quarter finals. Tuft then had two chances at the FCW Florida Heavyweight Championship against then-champion Jake Hager; first in a one on one match and then in a triple threat match along with Curtis. On August 28, she participated in an FCW Florida Heavyweight Championship No. 1 Contendership Fatal Four Way along with Curtis, Tyrone Evans, and Sheamus O'Shaunessy, who went on to win the match. Tuft then went on to have another two FCW Florida Heavyweight Championship shots against O'Shaunessy and lost both times.

By November 2008, her ring name was changed to Tyler Reks. On December 11, Reks and Curtis defeated The New Hart Foundation (DH Smith and TJ Wilson) to win the FCW Florida Tag Team Championship in Tampa, Florida. After numerous defenses and 139 days of holding the titles, they lost them in a Two On One Handicap match to The Dude Busters (Caylen Croft and Trent Barreta). Reks won a FCW Florida Heavyweight Title No. 1 Contendership match and on June 11, 2009, she captured the Florida Heavyweight Championship by defeating Drew McIntyre. She later lost the title to Heath Slater at the FCW television tapings on August 13. She later lost to Slater again during her rematch for the title. She lost to Joe Hennig in a FCW Florida Heavyweight Championship No. 1 Contendership match and lost a FCW Florida Heavyweight Championship No. 1 Contendership battle royal. She and Leo Kruger unsuccessfully challenged Los Aviadores (Epico and Hunico) for the FCW Florida Tag Team Championship.

==== Singles competition (2009–2011) ====
Reks made her main roster debut on the June 30, 2009 episode of ECW on Sci Fi, with a surfer in-ring persona, in a backstage promo with Zack Ryder. Reks had suffered a knee injury just prior to her debut, but was able to work through it and made her in-ring debut on the July 2, 2009, episode of WWE Superstars, losing to Ryder. On the July 21 episode of ECW, Reks gained her first win after defeating Paul Burchill, and then beat him again the following week. Reks participated in a 10-man battle royal on the September 15 episode of ECW for an ECW Championship opportunity against Christian, but the match would go on to be won by Ryder. Reks would begin a brief hiatus from television starting in November 2009 and began mainly working dark matches and house shows for both SmackDown and Raw and FCW matches. Reks was one of the participants in the 26-man pre-show battle royal at WrestleMania XXVI.

In April 2010, Reks joined the SmackDown roster following ECW's cancellation. After months of only working dark matches, Reks appeared as a heel on the October 15 episode of SmackDown, while sporting a beard, chest hair, and new attire in addition to never referencing to her time on ECW. After a promo, she challenged and defeated Kaval in a match for the latter's spot in the SmackDown Bragging Rights team. On the Raw before Bragging Rights, she participated in a SmackDown vs. Raw 30 Man Tag Team Battle Royal, in which SmackDown was victorious. At Bragging Rights, Reks was able to eliminate Santino Marella, before being eliminated by Sheamus. However, Team SmackDown was successful in winning the Bragging Rights Cup for the second consecutive time, which would end up being Reks' most significant accomplishment in her WWE career. After this, Reks was placed on Alberto Del Rio's Survivor Series team. On the SmackDown before the Survivor Series, she competed in a Ten Man Tag Team Battle Royal but her team lost. At Survivor Series, she was eliminated by Kofi Kingston, as Team Del Rio went on to lose the match to Team Mysterio. Reks was then moved into a feud with Chris Masters, defeating him once on SmackDown and twice on Superstars.

On January 30, 2011, Reks made her Royal Rumble debut at the namesake event, entering the Royal Rumble match as the sixteenth entrant, but was eliminated from the match in only 34 seconds by CM Punk and the New Nexus. Reks was involved in another dark battle royal at WrestleMania XXVII. Reks participated in a battle royal to determine the #1 contender for the World Heavyweight Championship. Her last in-ring television performance for five months would be beating JTG on Superstars.

==== Teaming with Curt Hawkins (2011–2012) ====
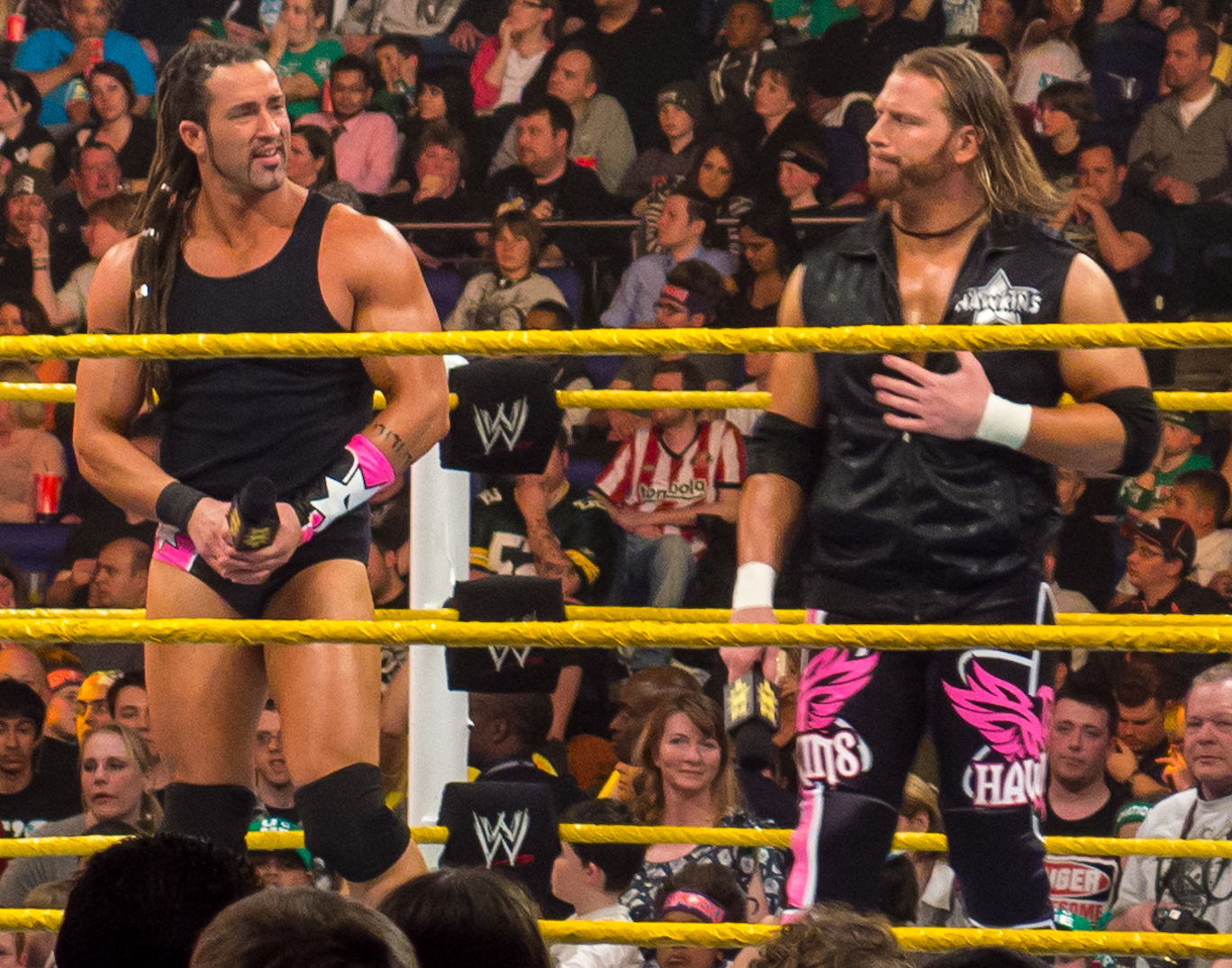
Reks (left) with wrestling partner Curt Hawkins

On April 26, Reks was drafted to the Raw brand as part of the 2011 Supplemental Draft. After wrestling dark matches for a few months, Reks made her Raw debut on September 5 in a backstage segment with Curt Hawkins, Wade Barrett, and Alberto Del Rio. On the September 8 episode of Superstars, Reks made her in-ring return as she teamed with Hawkins to defeat Titus O'Neil and Percy Watson. Hawkins and Reks then began appearing on the fifth season of NXT, by attacking the Usos from behind on the September 27 episode of NXT. Over the next two weeks on NXT, Hawkins and Reks faced the Usos in tag team matches, with Hawkins and Reks winning the first match and the Usos winning the second match. Reks made her singles return on October 16 losing to Yoshi Tatsu. Reks participated in a World Heavyweight Championship number 1 contender 41 man battle royal and the "All I Want For Christmas Battle Royal" and was eliminated in both. Hawkins and Reks would lose to the Usos once again on December 6. Reks and Hawkins would then lose a non-title match to the tag team champions Air Boom (Evan Bourne and Kofi Kingston) on the December 22 episode of Superstars. Hawkins and Reks engaged in a feud with the duo of Trent Barreta and Yoshi Tatsu beginning in December 2011. Both teams would play pranks on each other, with Tatsu being locked in a closet and Reks' hands being superglued onto an Xbox controller. The feud ended when Hawkins and Reks defeated Barreta and Tatsu on the January 18, 2012 episode of NXT.

Hawkins and Reks would then settle into the role of NXT's troublemakers, tormenting NXT host Matt Striker on his lackluster career and how they should be main-eventing NXT, even once going to the extent of assaulting him after a match. They forced Striker to appoint William Regal as NXT's prime authority figure on the February 29 episode of NXT. Regal would employ harsh measures to keep Hawkins and Reks in line, including threatening suspensions for bad behaviour and condemning them to janitorial duty, this caused them much frustration. On the March 21 episode of NXT Redemption, Striker was knocked out with chloroform by Johnny Curtis and Maxine, and then Striker was kidnapped (kayfabe) by unknown persons, later revealed to be Hawkins and Reks, who intended to blackmail Maxine into using her charms to get Regal to leave them alone. Unfortunately for Hawkins and Reks, Striker was rescued by Derrick Bateman and Kaitlyn. On the April 18 episode of NXT, the freed Striker confronted Hawkins and Reks about the kidnapping, and Hawkins admitted the crime. As punishment, Regal put Hawkins and Reks in a match against each other with Striker as referee and the loser of the match would be fired. Even though Reks won to supposedly save her job at the expense of Hawkins', Regal decided to fire Reks as well, sending the two troublemakers away from NXT.

However, Regal could not keep the duo away from NXT for long, as they managed to convince villainous higher authority figure John Laurinaitis to rehire them as NXT's security team on the May 9 episode of NXT. Hawkins and Reks would then continue to play the role of Laurinaitis' lackeys, confiscating anti-Laurinaitis signs at Over the Limit and attacking John Cena on the May 21 episode of Raw. Hawkins and Reks' association with Laurinaitis ended after Laurinaitis lost his job at No Way Out. On the final episode of the fifth season of NXT on June 13, Hawkins and Reks defeated Bateman and Percy Watson.

Hawkins and Reks would then engage in a one-sided feud with Ryback in July 2012. After both Hawkins and Reks lost singles matches to Ryback on SmackDown, Ryback defeated both of them in a handicap match at Money in the Bank. At Raw 1000, Hawkins and Reks, along with Jinder Mahal, Drew McIntyre, Hunico, and Camacho, attempted to ambush Kane to make a statement, but a returning The Undertaker interrupted the attack and the Brothers of Destruction disposed of Hawkins and Reks. The duo would once again lose to Ryback on the August 6 episode of Raw.

After being told by SmackDown general manager Booker T to "step it up", Hawkins and Reks debuted a stripper gimmick on the August 17 episode of SmackDown while squashing a jobber tag team. A week later, Reks asked for her release as she intended to retire from wrestling to spend more time with her family; she and WWE parted ways on August 21, thus ending the team.

=== Return to the independent circuit (2014) ===
Reuniting with Curt Hawkins, the pair tagged together as part of Pro Wrestling Syndicate picking up a win in September against Kevin Matthews and Lance Hoyt.

== In other media ==
During her time in WWE, Reks, together with Curt Hawkins, created an animated YouTube series called MidCard Mafia in 2011, which was quickly cancelled and pulled from the internet after complaints from WWE management. Since her transition, she has been featured on several television shows and media outlets including: The Tamron Hall Show, Breakfast Television, The New York Times, E! Online, Insider.com, Newsweek and Woman's World.

== Personal life ==
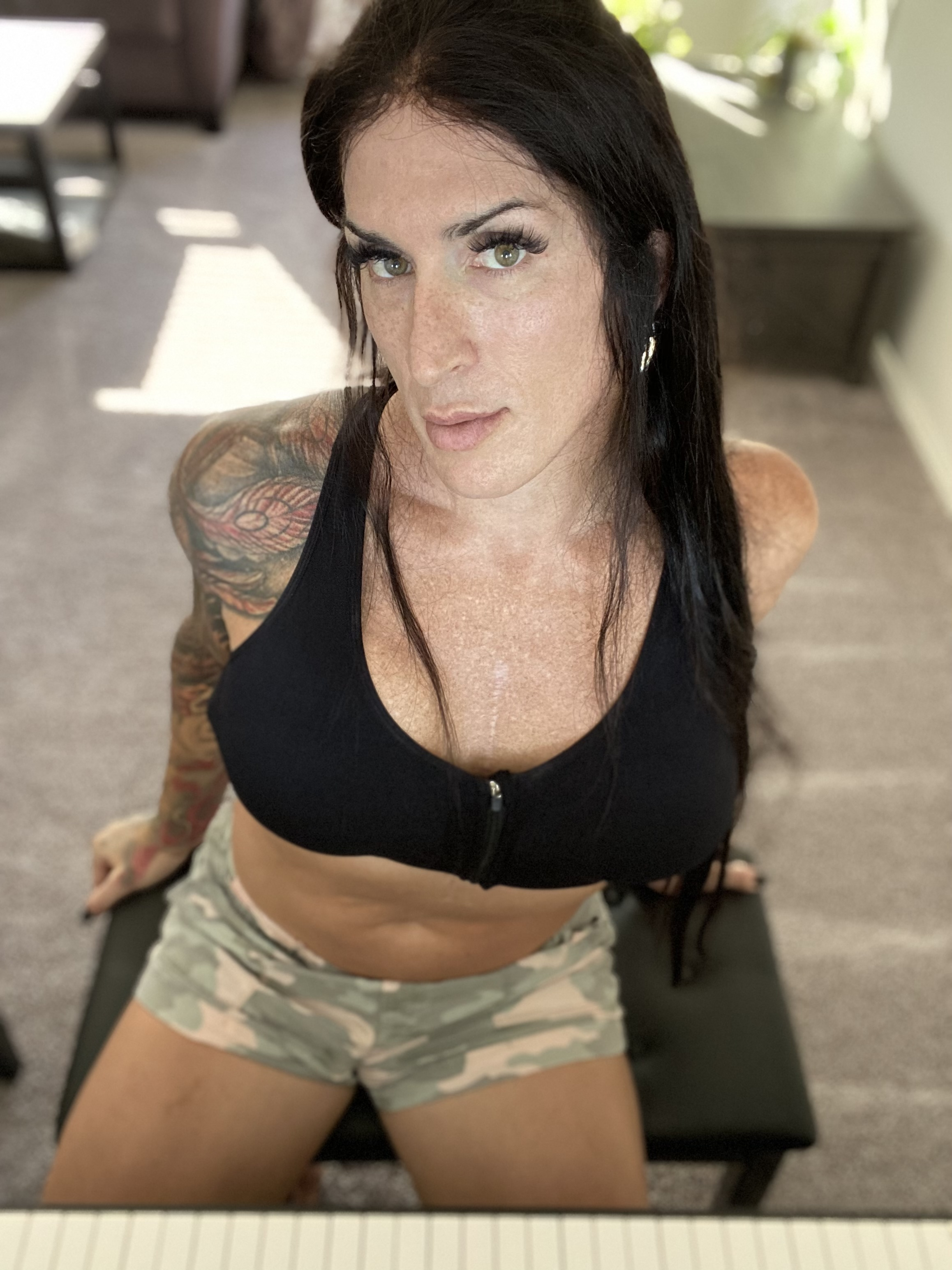
Tuft after transitioning

Tuft married Priscilla Tuft in 2002. Their daughter was born in 2011. Tuft came out as a trans woman to her wife in September 2020 and publicly on February 4, 2021. In an October 2023 essay for Business Insider, Tuft wrote that her transition had contributed to her separation from Priscilla in October 2021 and that they were in the process of divorcing, but stated that they remain "the best of friends".

In 2019, Tuft was diagnosed with an ascending aortic aneurysm and underwent open-heart surgery.

== Championships and accomplishments ==
- Florida Championship Wrestling
  - FCW Florida Heavyweight Championship (1 time)
  - FCW Florida Tag Team Championship (2 times) – Johnny Curtis (1) and Joe Hennig (1)
- Pro Wrestling Illustrated
  - Ranked No. 156 of the top 500 wrestlers in the PWI 500 in 2009
- World Wrestling Entertainment
  - Bragging Rights Trophy (2010) – with Team SmackDown (Big Show, Rey Mysterio, Jack Swagger, Alberto Del Rio, Edge and Kofi Kingston)
  - Slammy Award for Most Menacing Haircut (2010)
