= Viktor (wrestler) =

Canadian professional wrestler (born 1980)

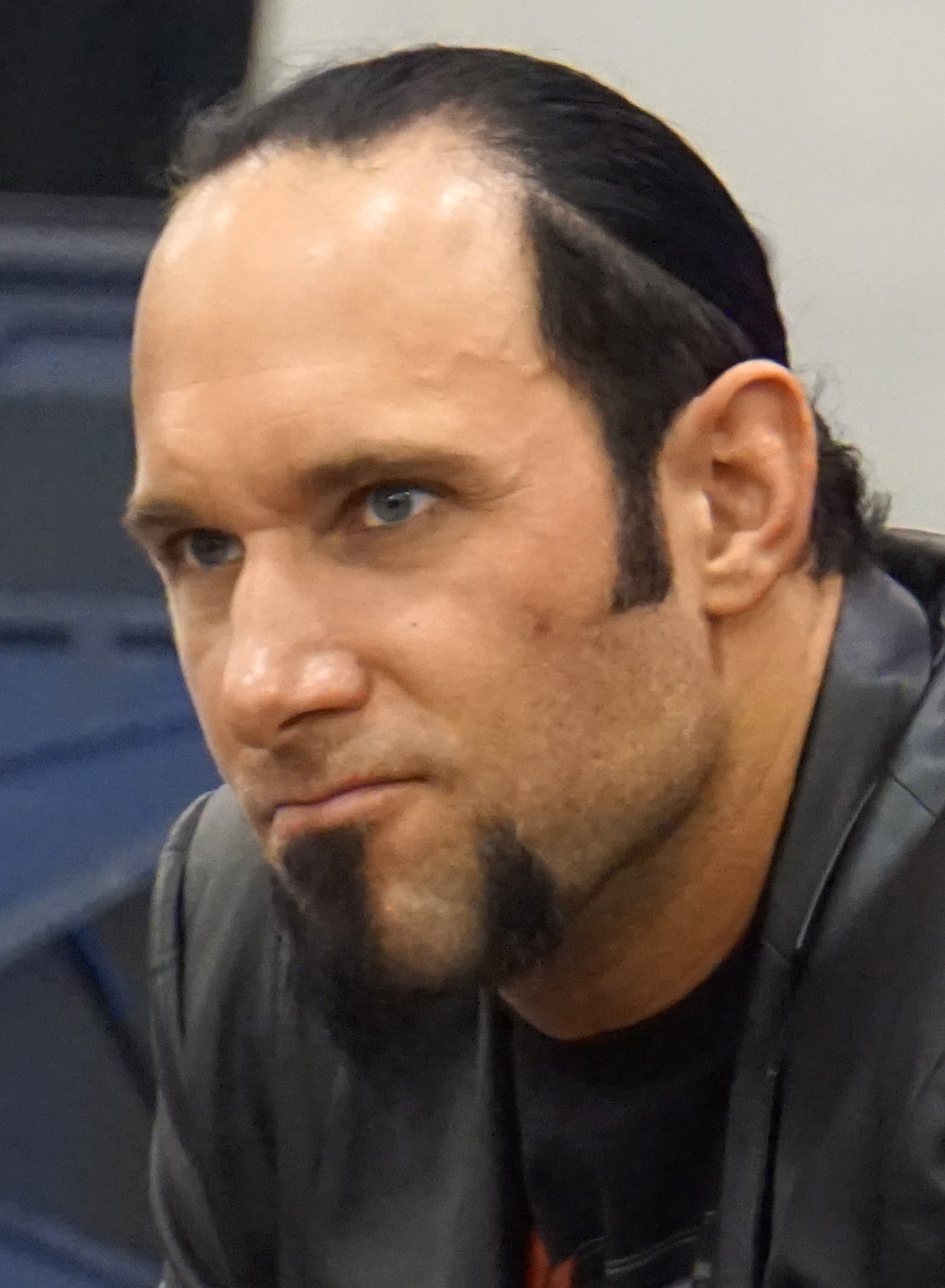
- Viktor in 2015

Personal information
- Born: Eric Thompson; December 4, 1980 (age 45) Calgary, Alberta, Canada

Professional wrestling career
- Ring name(s): Apoc; Apocalypse; Bishop; Dr. Vik; Erik Doom; Rick Victor; The Shadow; Viktor; Vik; Zyon
- Billed height: 6 ft 2 in (188 cm)
- Billed weight: 219 lb (99 kg)
- Billed from: Calgary, Alberta, Canada; The Wasteland
- Trained by: Bruce Hart; Ross Hart; Mr. Hito; Tokyo Joe
- Debut: 1999

Eric Thompson (born December 4, 1980) is a Canadian professional wrestler making appearances for the National Wrestling Alliance (NWA), under the ring name Zyon. He is best known for his time with WWE under the ring name Viktor.

While in WWE's developmental territory NXT, he was the longest reigning NXT Tag Team Champions of all time (alongside his The Ascension partner Konnor), and he is also a former Florida Tag Team Champion with Brad Maddox. He previously worked as Apoc for Ohio Valley Wrestling, where he was a two-time OVW Heavyweight Champion.

== Professional wrestling career ==
=== Hart Dungeon and Stampede Wrestling (1999–2008) ===
Thompson began his career in the Hart Dungeon, under the teachings of Bruce and Ross Hart. He also received training under Tokyo Joe. He started working for Stampede Wrestling in 2001 as Bishop, later to be renamed "Apocalypse" which he continued to work as until 2008. In Stampede Wrestling, he won the North American Heavyweight Championship. He also held the International Tag Team Championship twice. Once with partner Harry Smith, then with Dave Swift.

=== Independent circuit (2003–2011) ===
Viktor did a tour with New Japan Pro-Wrestling as "The Shadow" in November–December 2003. In his first match, he teamed with Scott Norton against Josh Barnett and Hiroyoshi Tenzan. He also had matches with Manabu Nakanishi and Tenzan. In addition, he teamed with Norton frequently on the tour. Apoc would debut under the name Apocalypse for Derby City Wrestling in a thirty-man battle royal, which was eventually would be won by Electrico. Apocalypse would team up with Al Barone to take part in the DCW Tag Team Title Tournament but were defeated by Damian Adams and Jamin Olivencia in the first round. Apocalypse got to the final of the DCW Championship Tournament but would lose to Big Cat. For the rest of 2008, Apocalypse would form multiple tag teams with Kharn Alexander, Vaughn Lilas and Fang.

On January 16, 2008, Apoc would debut under his new name Erik Doom and lost to Justin LaRouche. He would continue to lose most of his matches which is customary in nearly all wrestling promotions. Doom and Kharn Alexander lost to Los Locos (Ramon and Raul) in a match for the OVW Southern Tag Team Championship. He went back to his old name, Apocalypse before being renamed Apoc in late spring. On May 21, Apoc took on Nick Dinsmore for the OVW Heavyweight Championship but lost. Apoc teamed with Vaughn Lilas for several months before winning the OVW Southern Tag Team Championship from Darriel Kelly and Josh Lowry. The team would lose the titles to Dirty Money and Scott Cardinal in a championship vs $1000 match. After the loss the team would split and the two began feuding for the OVW Heavyweight Championship which Vaughn was currently holding. In February, Apoc beat Vaughn for the championship and would hold it for two months before losing it to Vaughn once again and regaining the championship in May. He would go on to lose the championship to Low Rider. While wrestling in Canada in 2010, Apoc primarily wrestled for WFX Wrestling and Prairie Wrestling Alliance. He took on Jack Sloan for the PWA Canadian Heavyweight Championship twice but failed both times. He formed a stable with Kevin Thorn and Gangrel and took part in WFX Tag Team Championship Tournament but went out in the first round. He would go on to feud with the PWA Mayhem Champion Randy Myers, after losing a few times, Apoc defeated Myers in a two out of three falls match for the championship.

=== WWE (2011–2019) ===
==== Developmental territories (2011–2013) ====
In February 2011, Thompson signed a developmental contract with WWE and was assigned to their developmental territory Florida Championship Wrestling under the ring name Rick Victor. Victor made his televised in-ring debut for on the May 29, 2011 episode of FCW TV, teaming with Leo Kruger in a loss to Hunico and Epico. On the July 31 episode of FCW TV, Victor challenged Seth Rollins for his FCW 15 Championship, but was defeated. From April to May 2012, Victor formed an association with the Anti-Divas (Sofia Cortez and Paige). At a FCW live event on June 16, 2012, Victor defeated Seth Rollins to win the FCW Florida Heavyweight Championship for the first time. Immediately afterwards, he lost the title to Bo Dallas in another match. He regained the title from Dallas at another FCW live event on July 13, 2012, making him a two-time champion. He lost the title to Richie Steamboat a week later. On July 28, Victor won the Florida Tag Team Championship with Brad Maddox.

When WWE rebranded its developmental territory FCW into NXT, Victor's NXT television debut took place on the June 20 episode of the rebooted NXT taped at Full Sail University, where he lost to Bo Dallas. On the September 12 episode of NXT, Victor confronted and slapped the NXT Champion, Seth Rollins, leading to Rollins facing and defeating Victor in a non-title match on the September 19, 2012 NXT.

==== NXT Tag Team Champion (2013–2015) ====
Victor resurfaced nearly a year later in NXT when he became Conor O'Brian's partner in The Ascension. On September 12, The Ascension defeated Adrian Neville and Corey Graves to win the NXT Tag Team Championship. On November 10, O'Brian and Victor's ring names were changed to simply "Konnor" and "Viktor", respectively. On February 27, 2014, at NXT Arrival, he and Konnor successfully defended their championships against Too Cool, repeating the feat on May 29 at NXT TakeOver, against El Local and Kalisto. At the NXT TakeOver: Fatal 4-Way, The Ascension lost the titles to The Lucha Dragons (Kalisto and Sin Cara), ending their reign a day short of a full year. That same night, they were in an altercation with NXT General Manager William Regal and the debuting Hideo Itami. After feuding with and assaulting Itami for several weeks, a second international wrestler, Finn Bálor, joined Itami in his fight against both Konnor and Viktor. This led to a match on December 11 at NXT TakeOver: R Evolution, where The Ascension were defeated by Bálor and Itami.

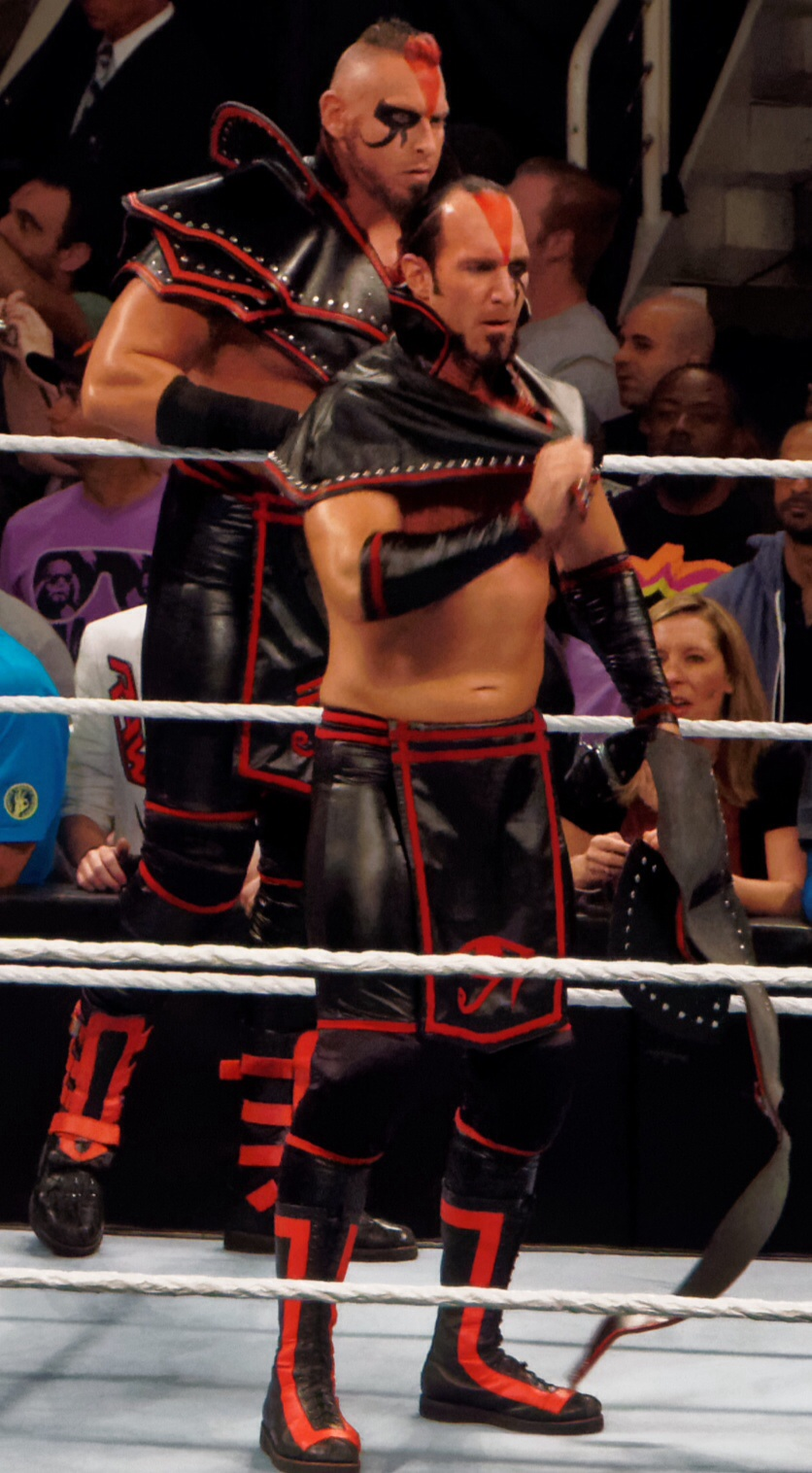
Viktor and Konnor, as the Ascension, in March 2015

Viktor, alongside Konnor made his main roster debut on the September 9, 2014 episode of Main Event, with the duo defeating Los Matadores (Diego and Fernando) in a tag-team match to promote their NXT tag title defense against The Lucha Dragons (Kalisto and Sin Cara) at the NXT TakeOver: Fatal 4-Way event. On the December 12 episode of SmackDown, vignettes began to air promoting The Ascension's call-up to the main roster. The Ascension made their debut on the December 29 episode of Raw, quickly defeating The Miz and Damien Mizdow. The Ascension would continue to squash local athletes three weeks in a row on Main Event while indirectly criticizing of The Road Warriors. Their first major victory as part of the main roster was a win over The New Age Outlaws at the Royal Rumble. The Ascension suffered their first pinfall loss on the main roster on February 23 episode of Raw, losing to The Prime Time Players (Darren Young and Titus O'Neil). At WrestleMania 31, The Ascension competed in the André the Giant Memorial Battle Royal where both failed to win the match. On the May 11 episode of Raw, during a match between Curtis Axel and Macho Mandow, in the guise of Randy Savage, The Ascension attacked Axel and Mandow. It was then announced that the Ascension would face Axel and Mandow on the Payback pre-show, where they won the match. It was announced the Ascension would partake in a six-team elimination chamber match for the WWE Tag Team Championship. At Elimination Chamber on May 31, he and Konnor eliminated Los Matadores and The Lucha Dragons until they were eliminated by The Prime Time Players, ultimately losing the match.

==== Various alliances (2015–2018) ====
On the September 3 episode of SmackDown, The Ascension aligned themselves with Stardust by attacking Neville before their match, and thus forming a group known as "The Cosmic Wasteland". At Night of Champions, The Cosmic Wasteland defeated Neville and the Lucha Dragons on the pre-show. On the Survivor Series kickoff, The Cosmic Wasteland, The Miz, and Bo Dallas were defeated by The Dudley Boyz (Bubba Ray Dudley and D-Von Dudley), Neville, Goldust and Titus O'Neil, in a traditional Survivor Series elimination tag team match. On the Royal Rumble kickoff, The Ascension lost a Fatal 4-Way tag team match to qualify for the Royal Rumble match. At WrestleMania 32, Viktor competed in the André the Giant Memorial Battle Royal but failed to win the match. On April 16, 2016, WWE suspended Konnor for 60 days for a second violation of the Talent Wellness policy. Following the suspension, Viktor began competing in singles competition, mainly on Superstars and Main Event. On the May 3 episode of Raw, Viktor competed in a United States Championship No. 1 Contender's Battle Royal which was won by Rusev. On the June 24 episode of Superstars, Konnor made his return from suspension, where The Ascension faced the Golden Truth (Goldust and R-Truth) in a losing effort.

On July 19 at the 2016 WWE draft, The Ascension were drafted to SmackDown, making their debut on the July 26 episode in a WWE World Championship No. 1 Contender's Six-Pack Qualifying Battle Royal, which was won by Apollo Crews. At the SummerSlam kickoff, The Ascension competed in a 12-man tag team match where their team lost. They then entered the SmackDown Tag Team Championship tournament, where they were eliminated in the first round by The Usos. On the September 27 episode of SmackDown Live, The Ascension picked up their first win on the brand, when The Ascension and The Usos defeated Heath Slater, Rhyno and American Alpha (Chad Gable and Jason Jordan) in an eight-man tag team match. At 2017 Elimination Chamber, The Ascension competed in a tag team turmoil match for the SmackDown Tag Team Championship where they were the final team eliminated. Viktor, alongside Konnor, would later enter the André the Giant Memorial Battle Royal at WrestleMania 33, but both men were eliminated from the match. At Money in the Bank (2017), The Ascension lost to Breezango after they claimed responsibility for a vandal attack in their office. On the June 27 episode of SmackDown Live, The Ascension was interrogated by Breezango on "Fashion Vice", admitting that they didn't commit the crime and only took responsibility, because they wanted a match at the PPV. In September, the duo turned face when they started trying to befriend Breezango during the latter's 'Fashion Files' segments. On the January 9 episode of SmackDown Live, The Ascension suffered a loss to The Bludgeon Brothers (Harper and Rowan), for a while the duo would only appear as supporting characters in Breezango's Fashion Files skits. At WrestleMania 34, Viktor competed in the André the Giant Memorial Battle Royal but failed to win the match.

==== Final appearances and departure (2018–2019) ====
During the 2018 Superstar Shake-up, The Ascension was traded to Raw. On the April 23 episode of Raw, The Ascension, once again as heels, facing against the team of Matt Hardy and Bray Wyatt in a losing effort. At the Greatest Royal Rumble event, Viktor entered at number 8 but was eliminated by Daniel Bryan. At Survivor Series, The Ascension was a part of Team Raw in a 10-on-10 Survivor Series tag team elimination match where their team lost. At WrestleMania 35, Viktor competed in the André the Giant Memorial Battle Royal but failed to win the match. On the April 12, 2019 episode of Main Event, The Ascension lost to Heavy Machinery (Otis and Tucker), in what would be their final match in WWE.

On December 8, 2019, Viktor and his Ascension teammate Konnor were released from the WWE.

=== Return to independent circuit (2020) ===
Following their departure from WWE, Konnor and Viktor were announced for Wrestling Revolver's Pancakes and Piledrivers event during WrestleMania 36 weekend. On February 20, 2020, The Ascension competed in their first match since leaving WWE at Outlaw Wrestling defeating Bull James and Bill Carr.

=== National Wrestling Alliance (2024–present) ===
At Back to the Territories, Zyon fought Juventud Guerrera for NWA Kross Fire Championship which ended in no contest. At 76th Anniversary Show, Zyon and "Magic" Jake Dumas defeated Baron Von Storm and Jax Dane. At Samhain 2, Zyon and "Magic" Jake Dumas lost to Baron Von Storm and Jax Dane. At Shockwave, Zyon lost to Burchill in a Dane Memorial Heavyweight Tournament first round match. At Hard Times V, Zyon lost to Mike Mondo. At Crockett Cup, The Nightmare Syndicate (Zyon and Frank) lost to Daisy Kill and Talos in a Crockett Cup first round match. At 77th Anniversary Show, The Nightmare Syndicate (Zyon and Frank) competed in a Four-way tag team elimination match to determine the #1 contenders to the NWA World Tag Team Championship which was won by The Colóns (Eddie Colón and Orlando Colón).

== Other media ==
Viktor made his video game debut as a part of the NXT Arrival DLC pack in WWE 2K15, then reappeared as part of WWE 2K16, WWE 2K17, WWE 2K18 and WWE 2K19 and the WWE film Countdown.

== Championships and accomplishments ==
- Atomic Revolutionary Wrestling
  - ARW Tag Team Championship (1 time) – with Big Kon
- Florida Championship Wrestling
  - FCW Florida Heavyweight Championship (2 times)
  - FCW Florida Tag Team Championship (1 time) – with Brad Maddox
- Ohio Valley Wrestling
  - OVW Heavyweight Championship (2 times)
  - OVW Southern Tag Team Championship (1 time) – with Vaughn Lilas
- Prairie Wrestling Alliance
  - PWA Mayhem Championship (1 time)
- Pro Wrestling Illustrated
  - PWI ranked him No. 128 of the top 500 singles wrestlers in the PWI 500 in 2014
- Universal Championship Wrestling
  - UCW Unified Atlantic Tag Team Championship (1 time) – with Big Kon
- Stampede Wrestling
  - Stampede North American Heavyweight Championship (2 time)
  - Stampede Wrestling International Tag Team Championship (2 times) – with Harry Smith (1) and Dave Swift (1)
- WWE
  - NXT Tag Team Championship (1 time) – with Konnor
