= Brad Maddox =

American professional wrestler (born 1984)

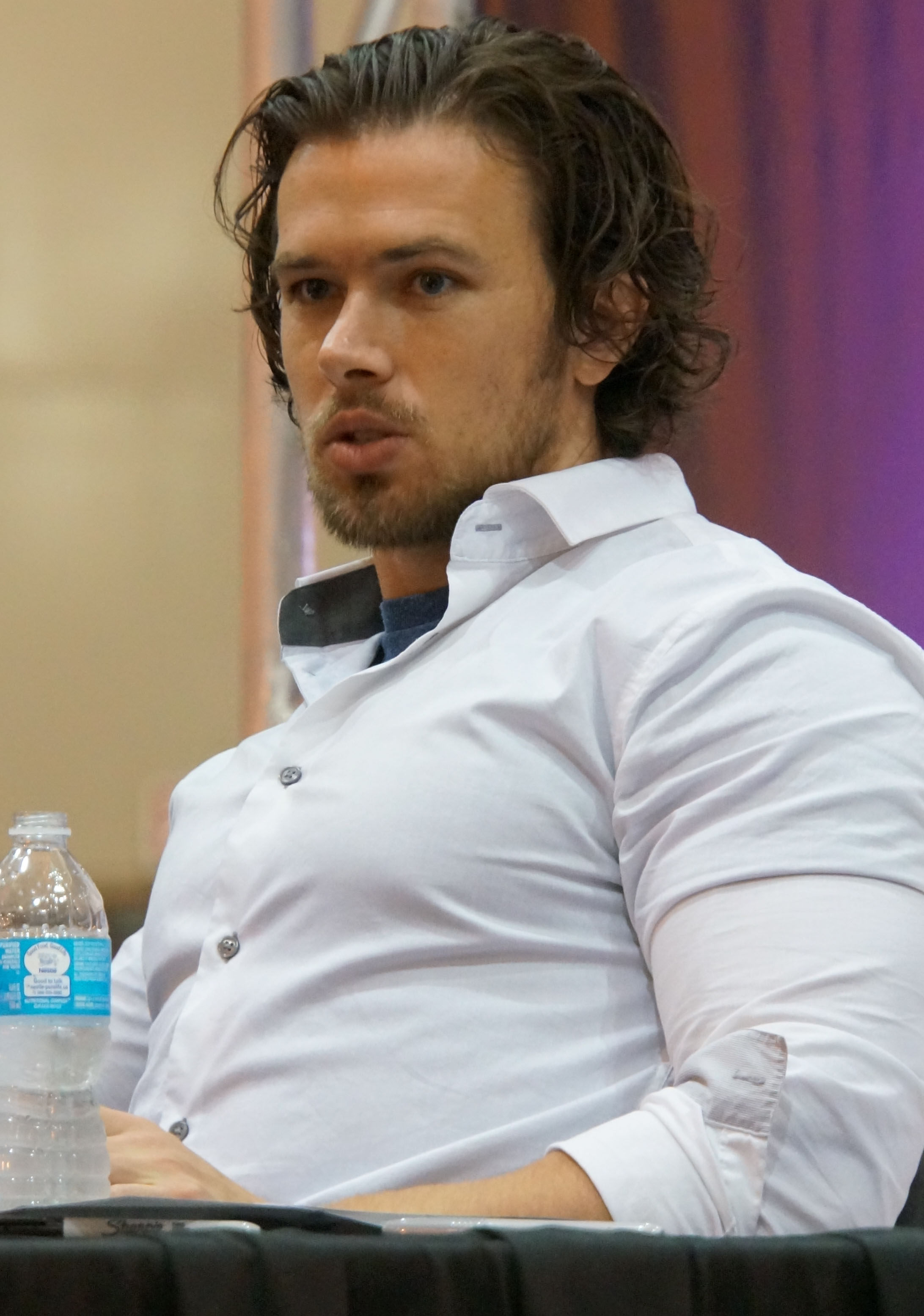
- Maddox in 2014

Personal information
- Born: Joshua Tyler Kluttz; May 4, 1984 (age 42) Tega Cay, South Carolina, U.S.

Professional wrestling career
- Ring name(s): Brad Maddox; The Goof; Joshua Kingsley; Lord Ruffles; Mad Braddox; Brent Wellington
- Billed height: 5 ft 11 in (180 cm)
- Billed weight: 207 lb (94 kg)
- Billed from: Charlotte, North Carolina
- Trained by: Joey Mercury; Rip Rogers; Nightmare Danny Davis; Tom Prichard; Florida Championship Wrestling
- Debut: April 2, 2008
- Retired: 2021

Joshua Tyler Kluttz (born May 4, 1984) is an American retired professional wrestler and senior referee, best known for his tenure in WWE, where he performed under the ring name Brad Maddox.

From 2008 to 2012, Kluttz was assigned to WWE's developmental territories Ohio Valley Wrestling (OVW) and Florida Championship Wrestling (FCW), where he held the OVW Heavyweight Championship and OVW Television Championship once each and the FCW Florida Tag Team Championship twice with different partners. He served as the General Manager of Raw in storyline from July 2013 to May 2014, before being released in November 2015.

== Professional wrestling career ==
=== World Wrestling Entertainment/WWE (2008–2015) ===
==== Debut and Ohio Valley Wrestling (2008–2010) ====
Kluttz debuted on March 14, 2008, for Derby City Wrestling (DCW), under the name Brent Wellington, losing to Big Cat. He won his first match on May 8, 2008, teaming with James "Moose" Thomas, defeating The War Party (Indian Outlaw and Lennox Lightfoot). During this time, Kluttz would also wrestle for OVW, often teaming with Gavin Garrison and James "Moose" Thomas as the group Theta Lambda Psi, amongst others. Kluttz would have a title match for the OVW Heavyweight Championship on December 24, 2008, losing to Aaron "The Idol" Stevens.

After he was defeated, he adopted the nickname "Beef". He had his first match under his new name at OVW Tapings January 14, 2009, winning with his Theta Lambda Psi team against Ted McNaler and Adam Revolver. Theta Lambda Psi split in April 2009, after Kluttz defeated James "Moose" Thomas, before losing their rematch after being hit with a paddle. On July 26, 2009, he competed for the OVW Television Championship against Jamin Olivencia, winning the match to claim his first championship. His reign lasted 45 days when he was defeated by his former Theta Lambda Psi partner James "Moose" Thomas during OVW tapings on September 9, 2009. On 27 February 2010 Kluttz won the vacant OVW Heavyweight Championship by winning a Battle Royal. His reign lasted 90 days before losing the title on May 29, 2010, to Mike Mondo. In mid-2010 it was reported that Kluttz had signed a development contract with WWE.

==== Florida Championship Wrestling (2010–2012) ====
Kluttz was renamed Brad Maddox and debuted for Florida Championship Wrestling at a live show on August 5, 2010, losing to Tyler Reks. His TV debut was on November 4, 2010, losing to Tito Colon. He won his first match on the July 1, 2011 episode of FCW against Percy Watson and Richie Steamboat. On the 22 September edition of FCW Maddox defeated Briley Pierce. On the 13 October edition of FCW they formed a Tag Team and competed for the FCW Florida Tag Team Championship against CJ Parker and Donny Marlow, which they lost. On the November 3 tapings he won the Tag Team titles with Briley Pierce. On February 2, 2011, they lost their titles due to Pierce sustaining an injury. Maddox would attempt to regain the vacant title with Eli Cottonwood, losing to Bo Rotundo and Husky Harris. On the March 4, Maddox would be the first to sign for Summer Rae´s "organization", and she was at ringside when he was defeated by Seth Rollins.

On June 21, 2012, he won the FCW Jack Brisco 15 Championship from Richie Steamboat. While holding the FCW 15 Championship, he won the Florida Tag Team Championship with Rick Victor on July 28, 2012. He became the final holder for both titles, as all of FCW's championships were retired when the territory was rebranded as NXT .

==== Main roster referee (2012–2013) ====
Maddox was promoted to the main roster as a referee in August 2012, debuting on the August 20 episode of Raw when he refereed a Divas Battle Royal. On October 28 at the Hell in a Cell pay-per-view, Maddox refereed the main event, a Hell in a Cell match between CM Punk and Ryback for the WWE Championship. As Ryback was about to win the match, Maddox gave Ryback a low blow and proceeded to fast-count a pin for Punk, resulting in Punk retaining his title, turning Maddox heel in the process. Maddox explained his actions on the November 5 episode of Raw. He claimed that he was not working for Punk but his actions were self-motivated. Maddox revealed his lifelong dream of becoming a WWE wrestler, but WWE continually rejected him, so he took up the chance to be a referee and attacked Ryback to make a name for himself to earn a contract to become a WWE wrestler. WWE Chairman Vince McMahon then granted Maddox's request at a match against Ryback, while offering a million dollar contract if Maddox won. The next week, Maddox lost to Ryback, who threw him into an ambulance.

Maddox returned in December 2012, now accompanied by his personal cameraman, Carson, and claiming to be a "YouTube sensation". Raw Managing Supervisor Vickie Guerrero offered Maddox a contract if he could defeat Randy Orton, but Orton prevailed. Orton was attacked by the Shield after the match. Similar to Maddox, the Shield had earlier aided Punk by attacking Ryback during the duo's WWE Championship match at Survivor Series to ensure Punk's retention of his title and also denied an alliance with Punk. Maddox then took his pleas to SmackDown General Manager Booker T, who thrice granted him opportunities to earn a contract if he could defeat Brodus Clay, The Great Khali, and Sheamus, but Maddox lost all three matches. On the January 28 episode of Raw, via camera footage taken by Maddox's cameraman, it was revealed that Maddox, as well as the Shield, had been working for Punk's manager Paul Heyman all along, although Punk did not appear in the footage and claimed that Heyman had acted without his knowledge. Heyman had also instructed the Shield to attack Maddox. The next week on Raw, Maddox revealed he turned in Carson's footage to Vince McMahon and proceeded to call out the Shield, telling them that "justice awaits you". The Shield would come out to attack him until John Cena, Sheamus, and Ryback interfered.

==== Raw General Manager (2013–2015) ====
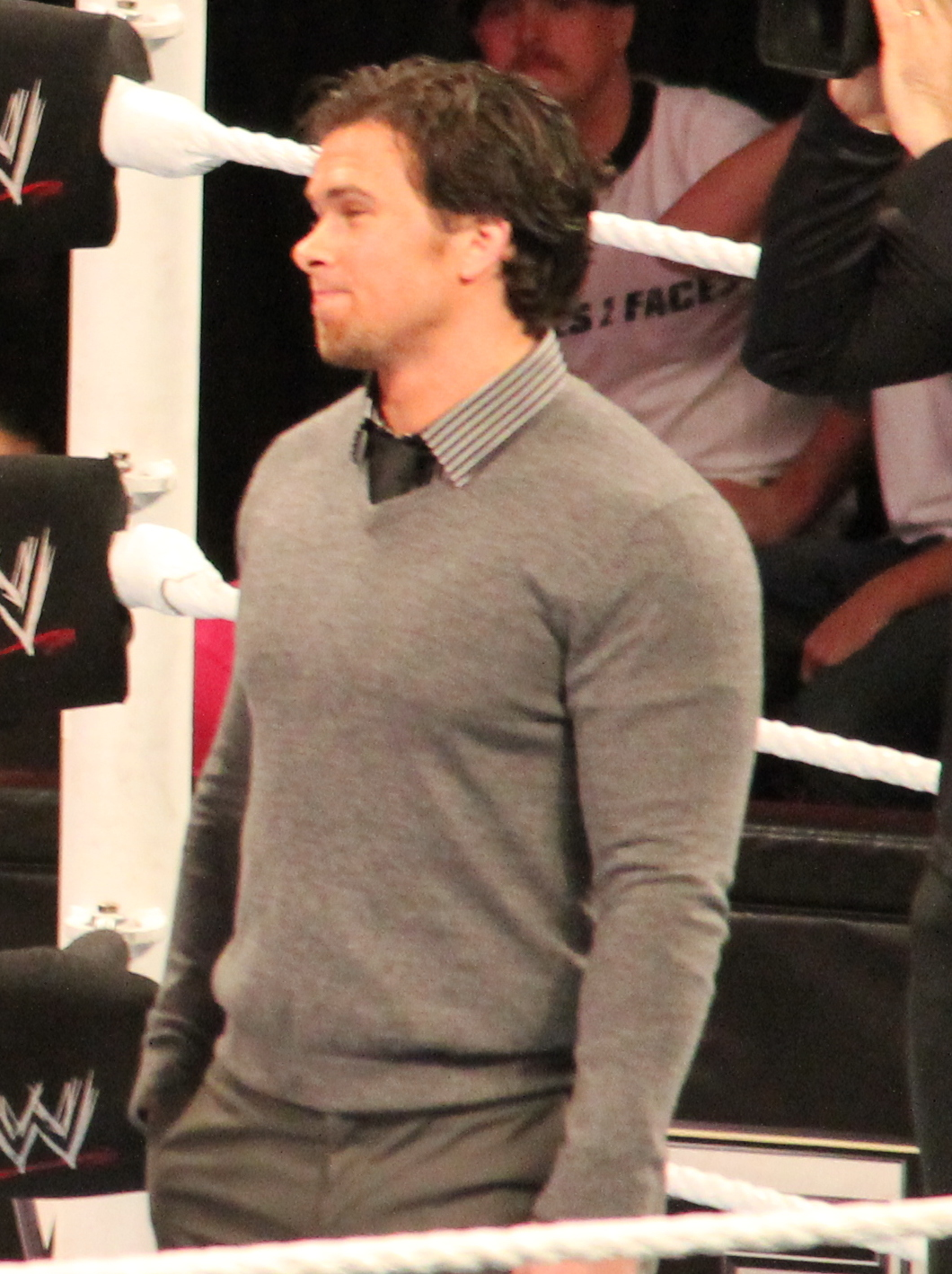
Maddox in February 2013

On the February 18 episode of Raw, Maddox was rewarded the position of Assistant Raw Managing Supervisor by Vickie Guerrero after revealing that Paul Heyman and CM Punk were working with The Shield. On the April 24 episode of NXT, Maddox challenged Big E Langston for the NXT Championship but was quickly defeated. On the July 8 episode of Raw, after Guerrero was fired as Raw Managing Supervisor following a fan vote, Maddox was appointed as the new general manager of Raw.

After allowing John Cena to choose Daniel Bryan as his opponent at SummerSlam, Maddox was entwined between Mr. McMahon and Triple H. On the August 12 episode of Raw, Maddox was the special guest referee in the match between Bryan and Wade Barrett, where he gave Barrett the victory after a fast count. Following this, Maddox announced himself as the guest referee in Bryan's match at SummerSlam, only for Triple H to come out and announce he would referee the match instead before giving Maddox a Pedigree.

Maddox then formed an alliance with Randy Orton, where he placed Orton's rivals, Dolph Ziggler and Big Show, in handicap matches against The Shield. Maddox continued to have tension with Big Show, who, after refusing to listen to Maddox's orders at Battleground, resulted in Big Show's firing by Stephanie McMahon on the following night's Raw. Later that week on SmackDown, Maddox was knocked out by Big Show after interrupting him, suffering a concussion in the storyline.

Maddox returned on the November 11 episode of Raw, where he asserted his authority to Randy Orton, only to be interrupted by the director of operations Kane and Vickie Guerrero. The next week on Raw, Maddox was placed in a No Disqualification match against Orton by Triple H; Orton won the match via referee stoppage after Maddox lost consciousness in the storyline and was carried out on a stretcher after getting punched with a microphone 17 times. Following this, Maddox began to compete with Kane to gain favor of The Authority over who ran Raw better before forming an alliance with Kane, aiding him in his feud with CM Punk.

At WrestleMania XXX on April 6, 2014, Maddox participated in the Andre the Giant Memorial Battle Royal and was quickly eliminated by Cody Rhodes and The Great Khali. On the April 25 episode of SmackDown, Maddox took over as general manager for the night, where he was attacked by The Shield. On the May 19 episode of Raw, Maddox defied the orders of Triple H of not allowing any member of The Shield at ringside, by making Dean Ambrose and Roman Reigns guest commentators. The following week on Raw, Maddox was relieved of his duties as Raw General Manager by The Authority, before being attacked by Kane. Maddox was absent from WWE television for the remainder of 2014, mainly working house shows.

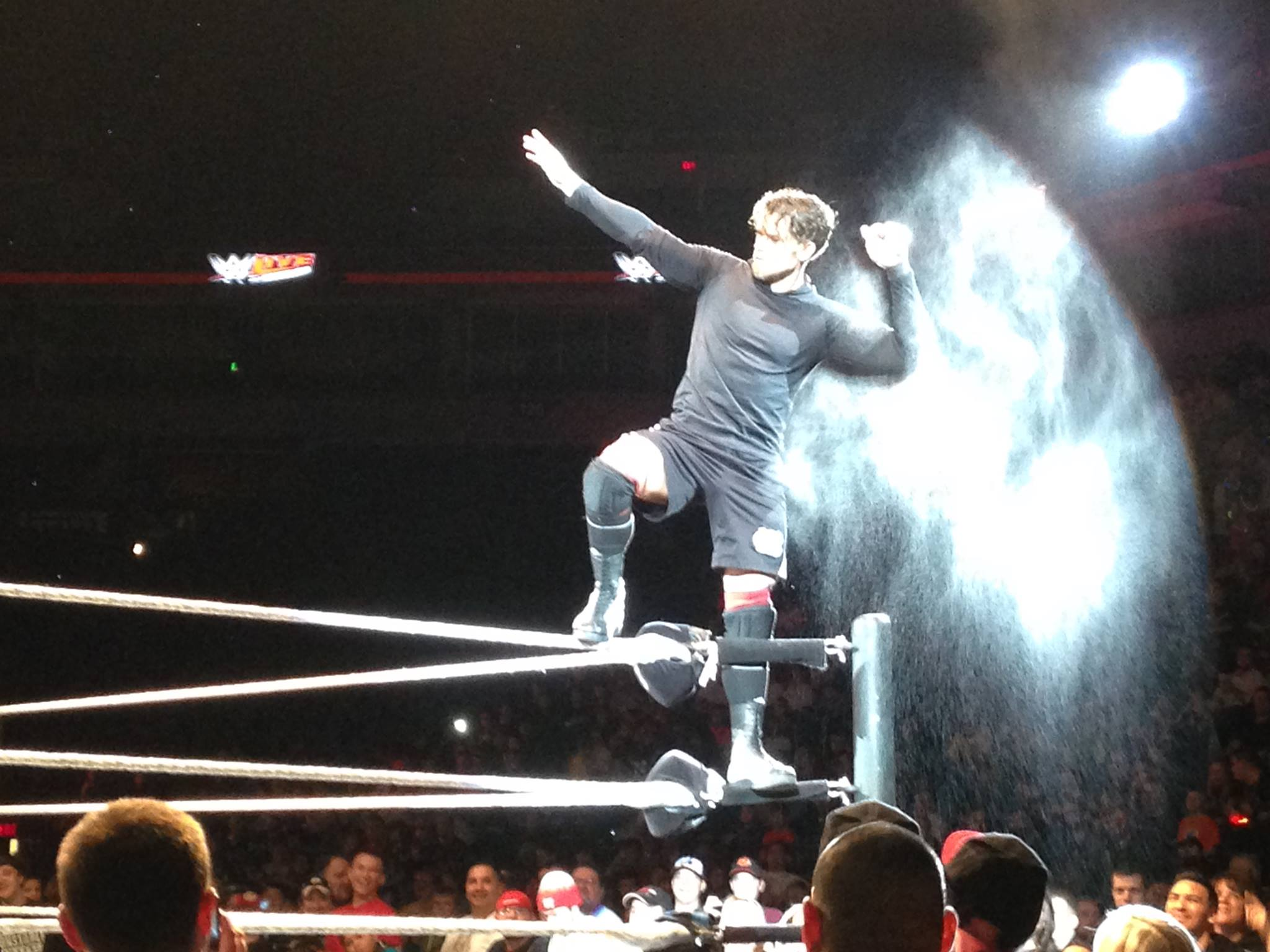
Maddox posing at the ring during a WWE house show in March 2015

Maddox returned on the April 6, 2015, episode of Raw in a backstage segment with Kane, before being interrupted by Seth Rollins. In August, Maddox began teaming with Adam Rose during live events, calling themselves "Beef Mode", where they lost to Damien Sandow and Curtis Axel. Later that month, Maddox performed under two different names during dark matches, as Joshua Kingsley on August 11 and Lord Ruffles on August 23, losing both matches against Zack Ryder. On the November 17 episode of Main Event, Maddox made his televised return, teaming up with Adam Rose in a losing effort against The Usos.

On November 25, Maddox was officially released by WWE after referring to the audience as "pricks" during a dark match.

=== Independent circuit (2015–2021) ===
Following his release, Kluttz made a handful of appearances under the ring-names Mad Braddox and Tyler K Warner until he retired from wrestling in 2021 to pursue a career in acting.

== Personal life ==
Kluttz is married to Ryan DiPretoro. Together they have two children.

== Other media ==
In 2014, he uploaded a series of found-footage style videos to his YouTube channel titled "The Brad Maddox Vacation Experience". As of June 2026, the videos had accumulated more than 8.3 million combined views.

On November 11, 2015, Maddox appeared on The Tonight Show Starring Jimmy Fallon. He appeared in a turkey costume in a segment with The Undertaker, in which Undertaker gave Maddox a Tombstone Piledriver.

He appeared in video games such as WWE 2K15 as an NPC and WWE 2K16, where he can be made a playable wrestler through the Superstar Faces creation mode on the PlayStation 3 and Xbox 360 ports of the game.

== Championships and accomplishments ==
- Florida Championship Wrestling
  - FCW Jack Brisco 15 Championship (1 time, final)
  - FCW Florida Tag Team Championship (2 times) – with Briley Pierce (1) and Rick Victor (1)
- Ohio Valley Wrestling
  - OVW Heavyweight Championship (1 time)
  - OVW Television Championship (1 time)
