= Hell in a Cell (2012) =

WWE pay-per-view event

- Promotional poster featuring CM Punk inside the Hell in a Cell structure
- Promotion: WWE
- Date: October 28, 2012
- City: Atlanta, Georgia
- Venue: Philips Arena
- Attendance: 10,000
- Buy rate: 199,000

Pay-per-view chronology
| ← Previous; Night of Champions | Next → Survivor Series |

Hell in a Cell chronology
| ← Previous; 2011 | Next → 2013 |

The 2012 Hell in a Cell was a professional wrestling pay-per-view (PPV) event produced by WWE. It was the fourth annual Hell in a Cell and took place on October 28, 2012, at Philips Arena in Atlanta, Georgia. The event centered on the men's Hell in a Cell match, a 20-foot-high roofed steel cage that surrounds the ring and ringside area with no countouts or disqualifications and the only way to win is by pinfall or submission in the ring.

Eight matches were contested at the event. Only one Hell in a Cell match was held, which was the main event where CM Punk defeated Ryback to retain the WWE Championship, ending Ryback's undefeated streak. In other prominent matches, Big Show defeated Sheamus to win the World Heavyweight Championship and Eve Torres defeated Layla and Kaitlyn in a triple threat match to retain the WWE Divas Championship.

The event drew a total of 199,000 pay-per-view buys, an improvement over last year's event, which drew 182,000 buys.

== Production ==
=== Background ===
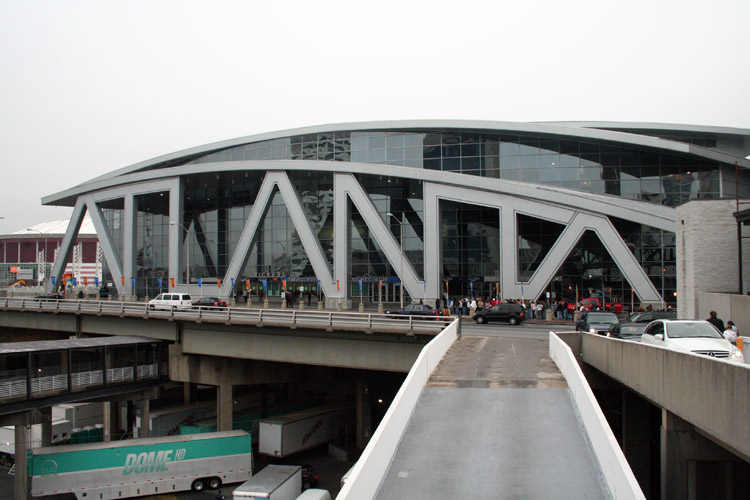
The fourth annual Hell in a Cell event was held at the Philips Arena in Atlanta, Georgia.

Hell in a Cell was an annual professional wrestling pay-per-view (PPV) event produced every October by WWE since 2009. The concept of the event came from WWE's established Hell in a Cell match, in which competitors fought inside a 20-foot-high roofed cell structure surrounding the ring and ringside area. The main event match of the card was contested under the Hell in a Cell stipulation. The fourth Hell in a Cell event was held on October 28, 2012, at Philips Arena in Atlanta, Georgia.

=== Storylines ===
The professional wrestling matches at Hell in a Cell featured professional wrestlers performing as characters in scripted events pre-determined by the hosting wrestling promotion WWE. Storylines were produced on WWE's weekly television shows Monday Night Raw and Friday Night SmackDown.

The main program involved CM Punk defending his WWE Championship against Ryback, contested inside Hell in a Cell. At Night of Champions on September 16, CM Punk and John Cena fought each other to a draw when Cena left his shoulders down while pinning Punk, making it a double pin. Following this, he continuously challenged Punk to a rematch, even while recovering from an arm surgery earlier in the month; Punk refused to accept. After Punk slapped WWE Chairman Vince McMahon, this resulted in a Street Fight match between the two that ended in a no contest.

Meanwhile, Ryback, who was undefeated since re-entering WWE in April (not including his time as the character Skip Sheffield) with a 38-match win streak, attempted to confront Punk, who usually escaped. This culminated on the October 10 with an episode of Raw where McMahon arrived and forced Punk to choose whether he wanted to face Cena or Ryback. When Punk took too long to decide, having been given a week to provide his choice, McMahon made the decision for it to be Ryback with Cena's endorsement. It was announced that it would be a Hell in a Cell match.

On the September 28 episode of SmackDown, Big Show defeated Randy Orton in the main event to become the No. 1 contender to the World Heavyweight Championship, held by Sheamus. Shortly before the match, Alberto Del Rio attacked Orton from behind, feeling he had stolen his spot to regain the No. 1 contender status. Following the match, Del Rio again attacked Orton. Also on September 28, an elimination tournament was announced to determine the No. 1 contenders to the WWE Tag Team Championship. Eight teams faced off: Team Rhodes Scholars (Cody Rhodes and Damien Sandow), Santino Marella and Zack Ryder, The Prime Time Players (Darren Young and Titus O'Neil), Rey Mysterio and Sin Cara, The Usos (Jey Uso and Jimmy Uso), Justin Gabriel and Tyson Kidd, Primo and Epico, and Kofi Kingston and R-Truth. On the October 22 episode of Raw, Team Rhodes Scholars won the finals by defeating Mysterio and Cara.

At Night of Champions, Layla was originally set to defend the WWE Divas Championship against Kaitlyn, who was attacked by a villainess in a masked disguise. Eve Torres replaced Kaitlyn and defeated Layla to capture the Divas Championship, and after successful defenses against Kaitlyn and Layla on back-to-back episodes of Raw, Aksana was revealed as Kaitlyn's attacker on the October 26 episode of SmackDown, committing the attack under Torres' orders. It was later announced that Torres would defend the Divas Championship at Hell in a Cell in a triple threat match against Layla and Kaitlyn.

== Event ==
Other on-screen personnel
| Role | Name |
|---|---|
| English commentators | Michael Cole |
| English commentators | Jim Ross |
| English commentators | John Bradshaw Layfield |
| Spanish commentators | Marcelo Rodríguez |
| Spanish commentators | Carlos Cabrera |
| Interviewers | Josh Mathews |
| Interviewers | Matt Striker |
| Ring announcers | Tony Chimel |
| Ring announcers | Justin Roberts |
| Ring announcers | Ricardo Rodriguez (Del Rio only) |
| Referees | Mike Chioda |
| Referees | John Cone |
| Referees | Jack Doan |
| Referees | Scott Armstrong |
| Referees | Brad Maddox |

Lilian Garcia was involved in a car accident before the event in Los Angeles, California; she was in a stable condition and expected to make a full recovery, and Tony Chimel substituted for her. When Jerry "The King" Lawler had been recovering from a heart attack, Michael Cole was joined in commentary by Jim Ross and John "Bradshaw" Layfield. During the broadcasting. Cole wished for Garcia to get well soon.

=== Preliminary matches ===
The event opened with Randy Orton facing Alberto Del Rio. Orton won the match after Del Rio missed an enziguiri and performed an RKO on Del Rio for the pin. Next, Team Hell No (Kane and Daniel Bryan) defended the WWE Tag Team Championship against Team Rhodes Scholars (Cody Rhodes and Damien Sandow). Kane was disqualified after he attacked Sandow and Rhodes, meaning Team Hell No retained the titles. After that, Kofi Kingston defended the WWE Intercontinental Championship against The Miz. Kingston executed Trouble in Paradise to retain the title.

In the fourth match, Antonio Cesaro defended the WWE United States Championship against Justin Gabriel. After countering a suicide dive with a European uppercut, Cesaro executed the Neutralizer on Gabriel to retain the title. Next, Rey Mysterio and Sin Cara faced The Prime Time Players (Darren Young and Titus O'Neil). Mysterio and Cara won after Mysterio performed a 619 and a diving splash on Young.

After that, Sheamus defended the World Heavyweight Championship against Big Show. Big Show dominated Sheamus throughout the match. Big Show executed a chokeslam on Sheamus for a near-fall. Sheamus executed White Noise on Big Show for a near-fall. Big Show executed a WMD on Sheamus for a near-fall. Sheamus executed a Brogue Kick on Big Show for a near-fall. Sheamus attempted a second Brogue Kick but Big Show avoided and executed a second WMD on Sheamus to win the title. In the seventh match, Eve Torres defended the WWE Divas Championship against Layla and Kaitlyn in a triple threat match. In the end, Torres executed a senton bomb on both Kaitlyn and Layla, pinning Layla to retain the title.

=== Main event ===
In the main event, CM Punk defended the WWE Championship against Ryback inside Hell in a Cell. Ryback gained the early advantage but Paul Heyman (Punk's manager) distracted Ryback, allowing Punk to spray Ryback with a fire extinguisher. Punk attempted to attack him with a steel chair but Ryback countered with a big boot, causing the chair to hit Punk, and threw Punk into the cell wall. Punk attacked Ryback with a kendo stick but Ryback was unaffected and performed a Meat Hook clothesline on Punk. Ryback attempted Shellshocked but Brad Maddox (the match's referee) inexplicably stopped Ryback and attacked him with a low blow. Punk pinned Ryback with a roll-up as Maddox made a fast count, thus Punk retaining the title. After the match, Maddox attempted to escape from the cell but was attacked by Ryback. After chasing Heyman, Punk attempted to escape by climbing the cell but Ryback followed him and executed Shellshocked atop the cell.

== Aftermath ==
A banged-up CM Punk opened Raw to boast of his over Ryback and said that he had nothing to do with Brad Maddox. Maddox explained on Raw that he had intentionally cost Ryback the match as a way of making a name for himself and "becoming famous" after he had been told that he would never achieve his initial dream of becoming a WWE Superstar. Maddox then demanded a WWE contract and a match with Ryback; Vince McMahon sarcastically replied that Maddox would be given a "million dollar contract" if he was able to beat Ryback. The match took place the following week, with Maddox being defeated in a squash match and leaving the arena in an ambulance. Ryback then continued his feud with Punk, and went on to unsuccessfully challenge for the title once again at Survivor Series in November 2012 in a triple threat match also involving John Cena, and in a TLC match on Raw in January 2013 after The Shield (Dean Ambrose, Seth Rollins, and Roman Reigns) attacked him in both occasions. It was later revealed on an episode of Raw that Paul Heyman had paid Maddox to make an interference in the match and help Punk retain the title.

== Results ==
| No. | Results | Stipulations | Times |
|---|---|---|---|
| 1 | Randy Orton defeated Alberto Del Rio (with Ricardo Rodriguez) by pinfall | Singles match | 12:38 |
| 2 | Team Rhodes Scholars (Cody Rhodes and Damien Sandow) defeated Team Hell No (Daniel Bryan and Kane) (c) by disqualification | Tag team match for the WWE Tag Team Championship | 13:08 |
| 3 | Kofi Kingston (c) defeated The Miz by pinfall | Singles match for the WWE Intercontinental Championship | 10:20 |
| 4 | Antonio Cesaro (c) defeated Justin Gabriel by pinfall | Singles match for the WWE United States Championship | 7:20 |
| 5 | Rey Mysterio and Sin Cara defeated The Prime Time Players (Darren Young and Titus O'Neil) by pinfall | Tag team match | 12:28 |
| 6 | Big Show defeated Sheamus (c) by pinfall | Singles match for the World Heavyweight Championship | 20:15 |
| 7 | Eve Torres (c) defeated Kaitlyn and Layla by pinfall | Triple threat match for the WWE Divas Championship | 6:30 |
| 8 | CM Punk (c) (with Paul Heyman) defeated Ryback by pinfall | Hell in a Cell match for the WWE Championship | 11:21 |
(c) / – the champion(s) heading into the match

=== WWE Tag Team Championship No. 1 Contender's Tournament ===
First round SmackDown; September 25 – October 2, 2012 (Aired: September 28 – October 5); Raw; October 1, 2012; Main Event; October 2, 2012 (Aired: October 3)
Team Rhodes Scholars (Cody Rhodes and Damien Sandow) | Pinfall
The Usos (Jey Uso and Jimmy Uso) | 1:56
Justin Gabriel and Tyson Kidd | 4:04
Team CoBro (Santino Marella and Zack Ryder) | Pinfall
Kofi Kingston and R-Truth | 4:17
The Prime Time Players (Darren Young and Titus O'Neil) | Pinfall
Rey Mysterio and Sin Cara | Pinfall
Primo and Epico | 9:22

Semifinals; Raw; October 8, 2012
Team Rhodes Scholars | Pinfall
Team CoBro | 3:07
The Prime Time Players | 7:14
Rey Mysterio and Sin Cara | Pinfall

Final (Note: The final was originally scheduled for October 15 but was postponed due to Mysterio's illness.); Raw; October 22, 2012
Team Rhodes Scholars | Pinfall
Rey Mysterio and Sin Cara | 13:02
