= FCW Jack Brisco 15 Championship =

Professional wrestling championship

FCW 15 Championship

Details
- Promotion: Florida Championship Wrestling
- Date established: January 13, 2011
- Date retired: August 14, 2012
Statistics
- First champion: Seth Rollins
- Final champion: Brad Maddox
- Most reigns: all titleholders (1 reign)
- Longest reign: Seth Rollins (252 days)
- Shortest reign: Brad Maddox (54 days)
- Oldest champion: Damien Sandow (29 years, 50 days)
- Youngest champion: Seth Rollins (24 years, 229 days)
- Heaviest champion: Damien Sandow (252 lb (114 kg))
- Lightest champion: Seth Rollins (205 lb (93 kg))

The FCW Jack Brisco 15 Championship was a professional wrestling championship contested in 15-minute Iron Man matches by Florida Championship Wrestling. A medal was held by the title holder, rather than a championship belt that is primarily used in professional wrestling.

== History ==
Seth Rollins and Hunico previously fought in the first 'FCW 15' match, an iron man match which lasted 15 minutes. Following the match, FCW's General Manager Maxine declared the FCW 15 Jack Brisco Classic Tournament, which included Rollins and Hunico in addition to Richie Steamboat and Jinder Mahal. In the tournament final, Rollins defeated Hunico to become the inaugural champion. The final match was later released on a best of Seth Rollins DVD put out by WWE in 2017.

== Reigns ==
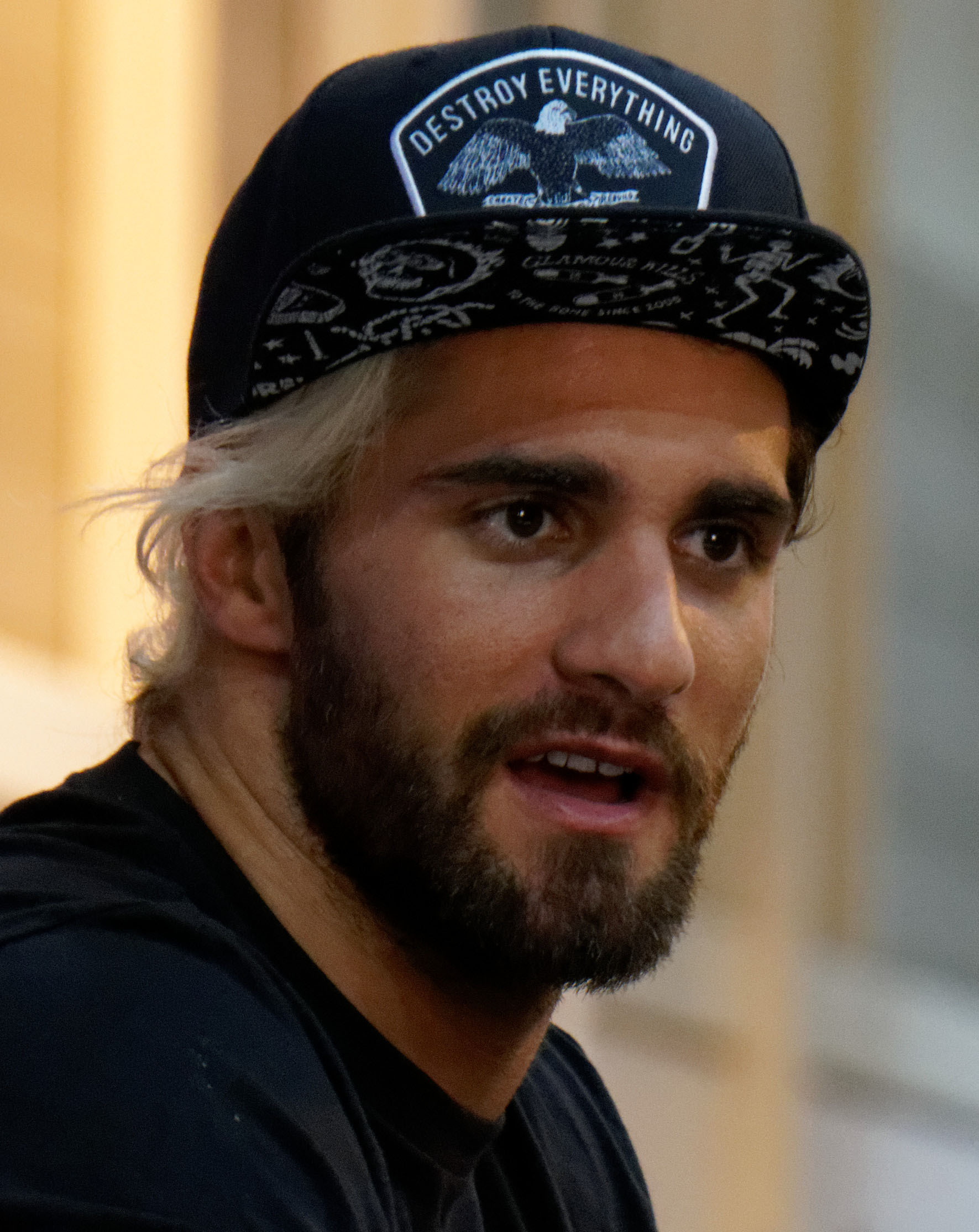
The inaugural champion Seth Rollins

Over the championship's one-year history, there have four reigns between four champions. Seth Rollins was the inaugural champion, and also holds the record for the longest reign at 252 days, with Brad Maddox's reign being the shortest at 54 days. Damien Sandow is the oldest champion at 29 years old, while Rollins is the youngest at 24 years old.

Maddox was the final champion in his first reign. He won the title by defeating Richie Steamboat on June 21, 2012, and held it until August 14, when FCW closed.

Key
No.	Overall reign number
Reign	Reign number for the specific champion
Days	Number of days held

No.	Champion	Championship change			Reign statistics		Notes	Ref.
No.	Champion	Date	Event	Location	Reign	Days	Notes	Ref.
1	Seth Rollins	January 13, 2011	FCW	Tampa, FL	1	252	Defeated Hunico in the finals of the 'FCW 15' Jack Brisco Classic Tournament to become the inaugural champion. Aired on tape delay on February 6, 2011.	
2	Damien Sandow	September 22, 2011	FCW	Tampa, FL	1	113	Aired on tape delay on October 30, 2011.	
3	Richie Steamboat	January 13, 2012	FCW	Tampa, FL	1	160	Steamboat defeated Damien Sandow, winning the bout two falls to one. Aired on tape delay on January 29, 2012.	
4	Brad Maddox	June 21, 2012	Live event	Tampa, FL	1	54		
—	Deactivated	August 14, 2012	—	—	—	—	Title retired immediately when Florida Championship Wrestling was disbanded.	
