= Florida Championship Wrestling =

American professional wrestling promotion

- Type: Private
- Industry: Professional wrestling
- Founded: June 26, 2007
- Founder: Steve Keirn
- Defunct: August 14, 2012
- Successor: NXT brand
- Headquarters: Tampa, Florida, U.S.,
- Owner: WWE

Florida Championship Wrestling (FCW) was a professional wrestling promotion founded on June 26, 2007 and based on the former National Wrestling Alliance member promotion, Championship Wrestling from Florida, which operated from 1961 until 1987. From October 2007 to August 2012, the promotion served as the official developmental territory for WWE. In August 2012, WWE folded FCW into their NXT brand, which began serving as their new developmental territory, with FCW storylines and championships being discontinued.

In March 2020 a documentary was released on WWE Network titled A Future WWE: The FCW Story, about the professional wrestlers that came up through the FCW system.

== History ==
The promotion was started by Steve Keirn in 2007 and became WWE's second developmental territory when they ended their relationship with the Georgia-based Deep South Wrestling in April 2007. It became their sole developmental territory in early 2008 when they ceased affiliation with Ohio Valley Wrestling.

FCW's first logo (2007–2008)

FCW's debut show was on June 26, 2007 at Tampa, Florida's Dallas Bull. A 21-man Battle Royal was held during the show, to crown the first ever FCW Southern Heavyweight Champion. The next year, the Florida Heavyweight Championship was introduced, with Jake Hager becoming the first champion at a February 15 show after surviving a Battle Royal and defeating Ted DiBiase, Jr. The Florida Tag Team Championship was also introduced in February, with the Puerto Rican Nightmares (Eddie Colón and Eric Pérez) beating Steven Lewington and Heath Miller to win it in the finals of a one night tournament. The singles titles were later unified, keeping the "Florida Heavyweight" name and championship.

On July 7, 2008, WWE confirmed that FCW was based on the original independent Championship Wrestling from Florida promotion, which operated from 1961 until 1987. The program's ending consisted of various clips from the ending of CWF's programs, featuring Gordon Solie's classic sign-off line "So long from the Sunshine State", accompanied by Solie winking one of his eyes and waving two fingers upward.

On July 17, 2008, the FCW Arena was officially opened, and included a taping of the debut episode of FCW TV.

On March 20, 2012, it was reported that WWE would cease operation at Florida Championship Wrestling; this claim was initially refuted by both Steve Keirn and WWE executive Paul "Triple H" Levesque, though Levesque noted WWE's developmental system would be "revamped".

Five months later, WWE dropped the FCW name, deactivated the titles, and began running all of its developmental events and operations under the "NXT" banner. WWE had been using the NXT name for a television program featuring rookies from FCW competing to become WWE main roster wrestlers, though the reality television aspects of the show had been dropped earlier in 2012. A revamped WWE NXT thereafter served as the primary television program for the new developmental brand.

== Championships and accomplishments ==
FCW
Championship	Notes
FCW Florida Heavyweight Championship	Contested for in their heavyweight division
FCW Southern Heavyweight Championship	Retired after being unified with the FCW Florida Heavyweight Championship
FCW Jack Brisco 15 Championship	Contested in 15-minute Iron Man matches
FCW Florida Tag Team Championship	Contested for in the tag team division
FCW Divas Championship	Contested for in the women's division
Queen of FCW	A crown was held by the title holder, rather than a championship belt that is primarily used in professional wrestling.

== Notable alumni ==
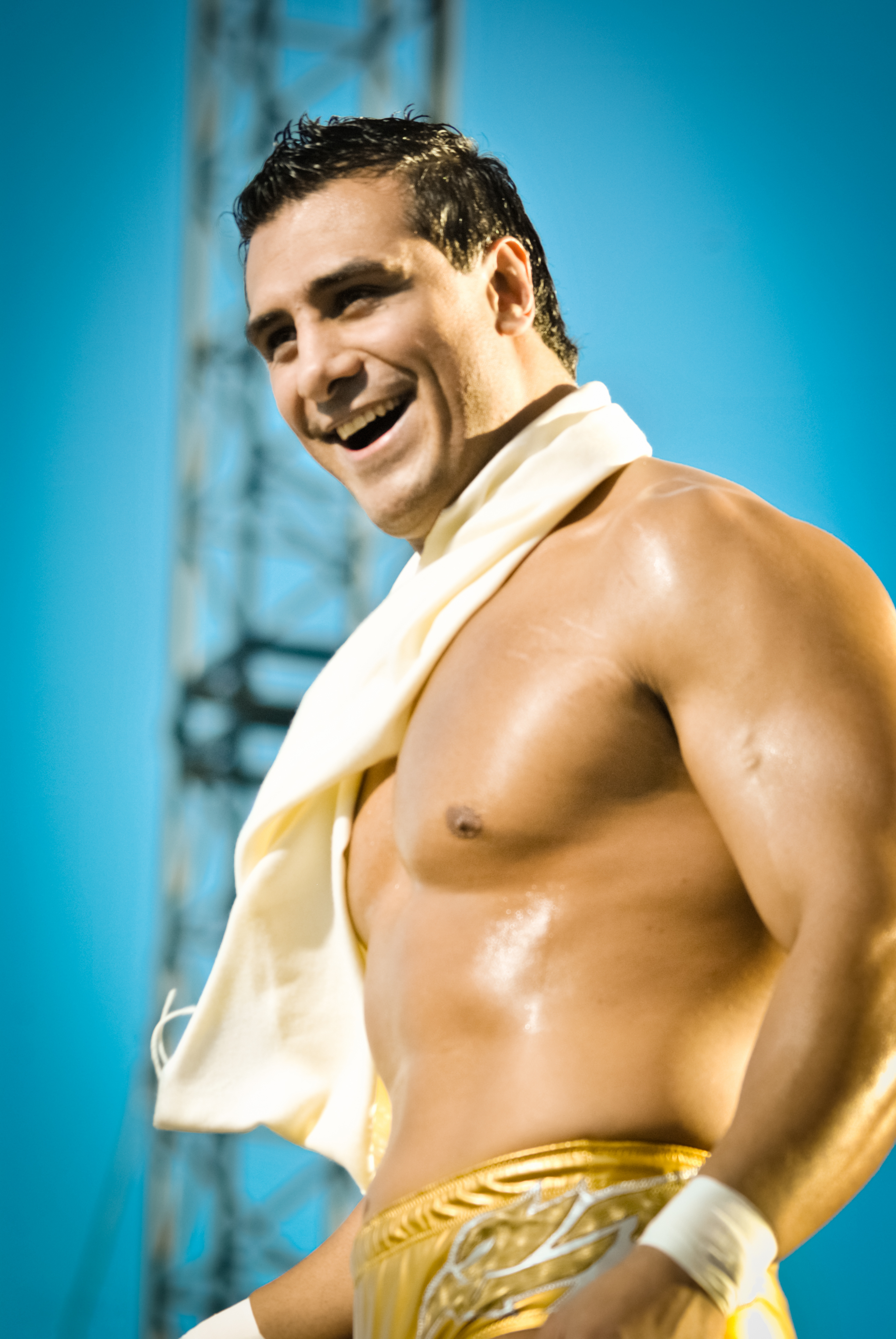
Alberto Del Rio

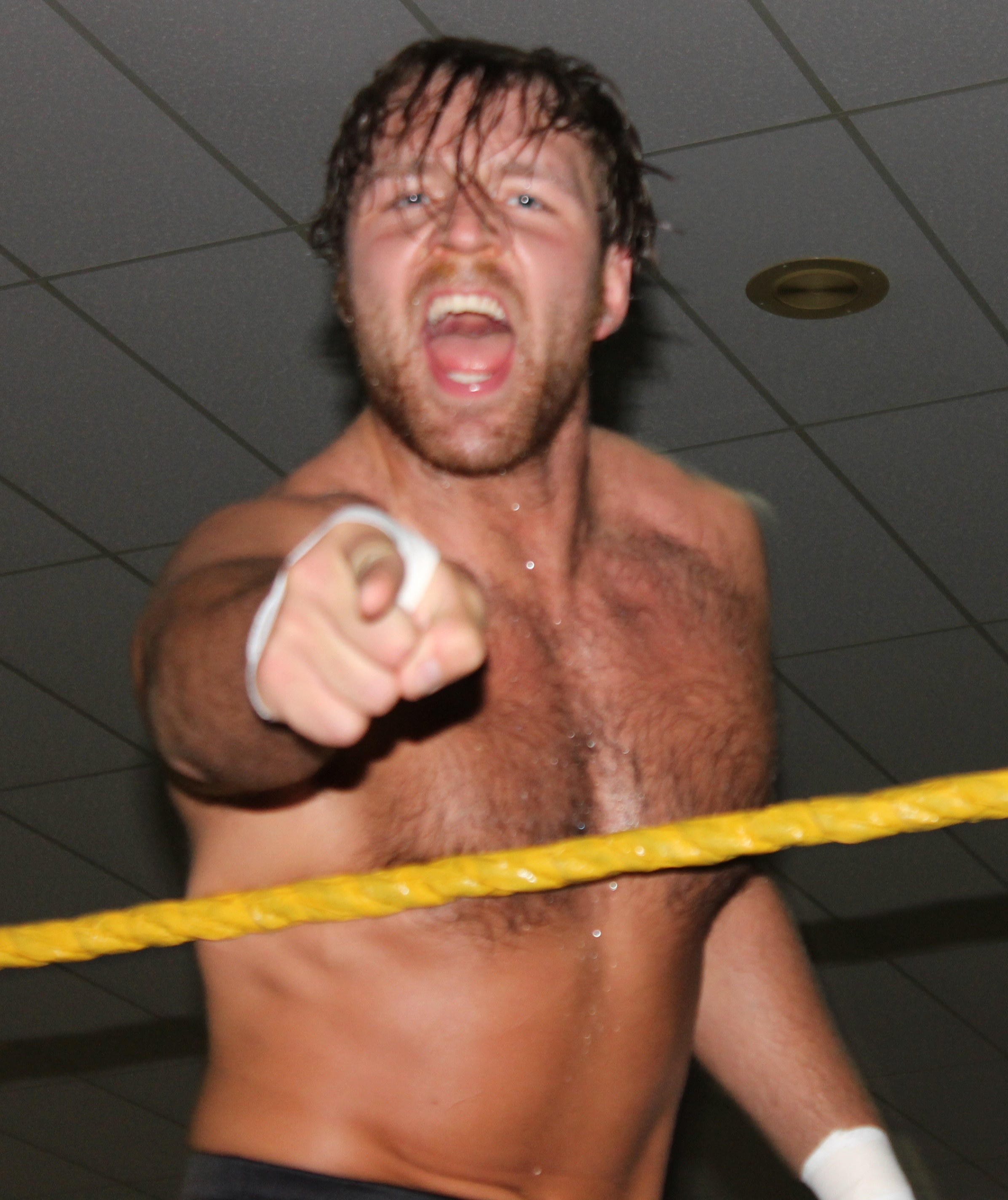
Dean Ambrose

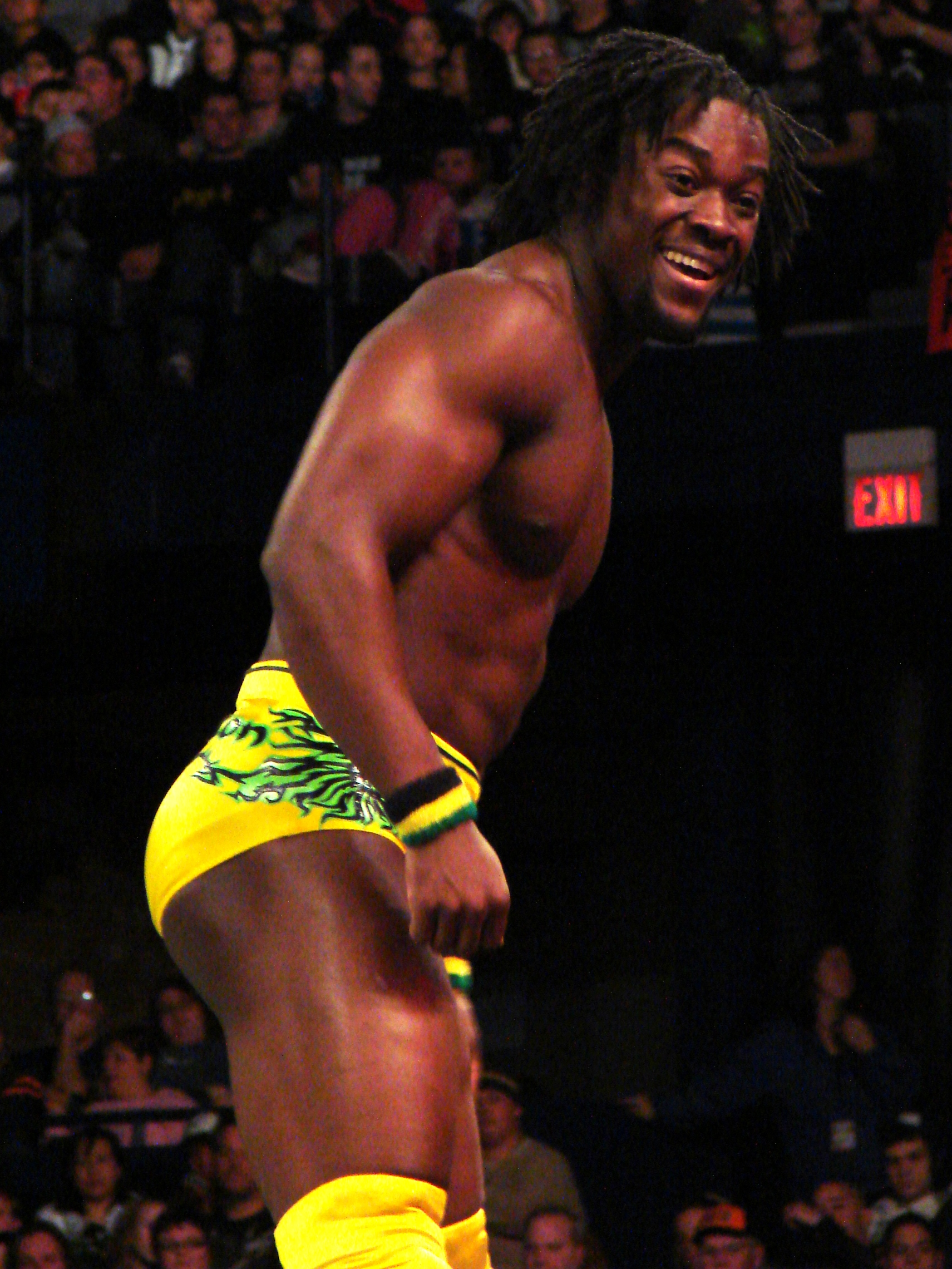
Kofi Kingston

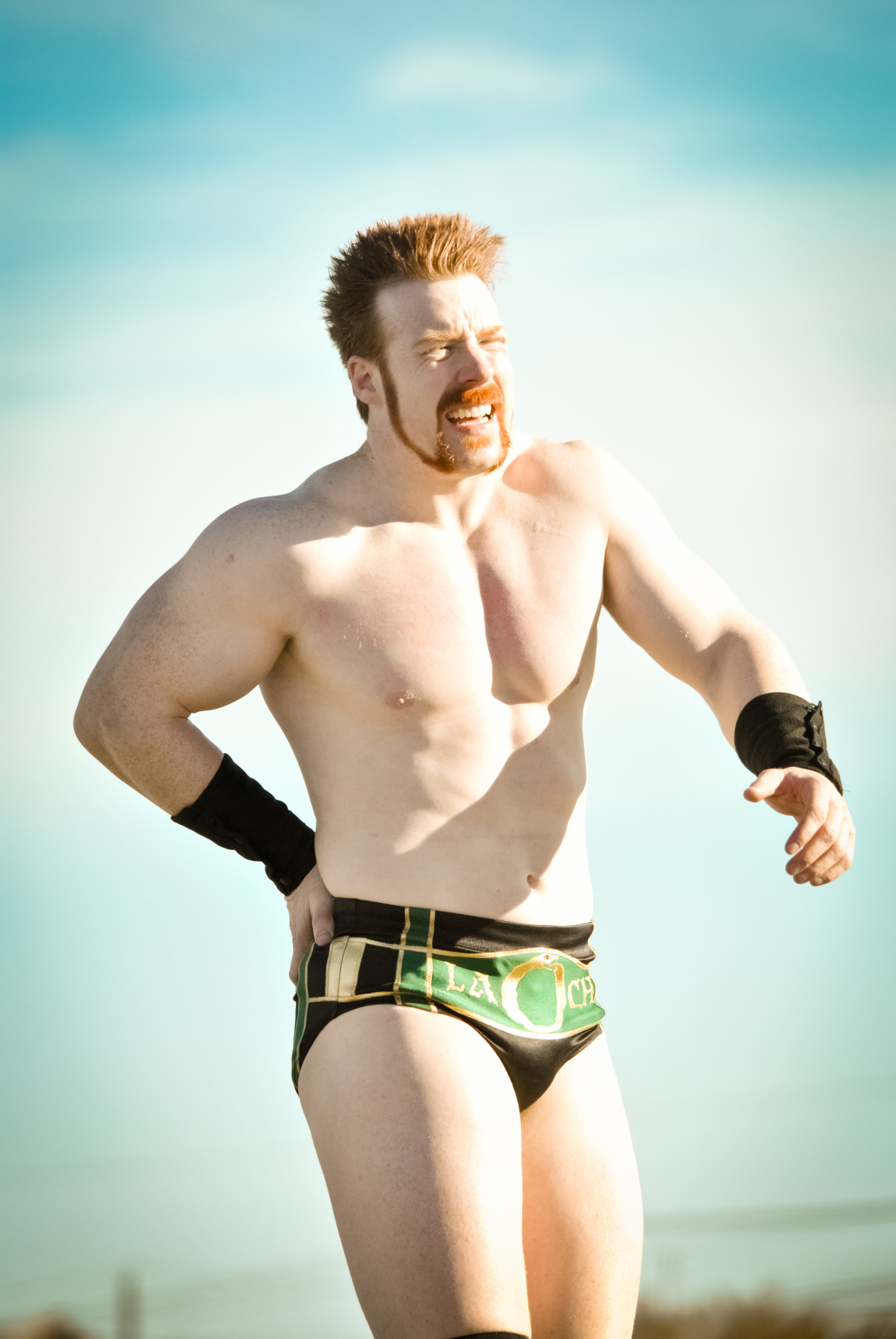
Sheamus

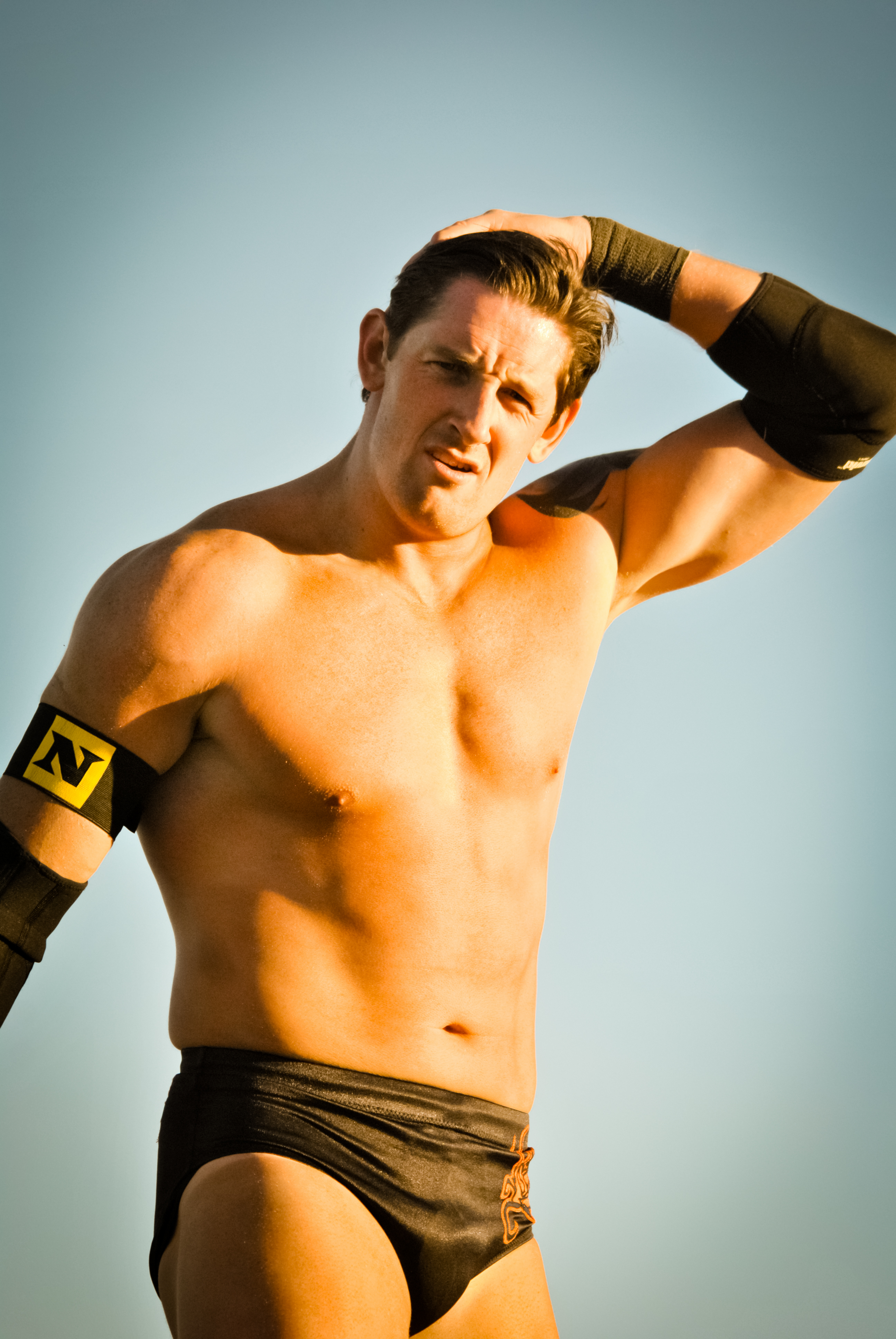
Wade Barrett

The following is a list of notable FCW alumni that were called to the main roster of WWE.

Ring name	Real name
AJ Lee	April Mendez
Aksana	Živilė Raudonienė
Alberto Del Rio	José Rodríguez
Alex Riley	Kevin Kiley Jr.
Alicia Fox	Victoria Crawford
Brad Maddox	Tyler Kluttz
Bray Wyatt	Windham Rotunda
Brie Bella	Brianna Danielson
Brodus Clay	George Murdoch
Big E	Ettore Ewen
Cameron	Ariane Andrew
Cesaro	Claudio Castagnoli
Curt Hawkins	Brian Myers
Curtis Axel	Joseph Hennig
Damien Sandow	Aron Haddad
Daniel Bryan	Bryan Danielson
Darren Young	Frederick Rosser III
David Otunga	David Otunga Sr.
Dean Ambrose	Jonathan Good
Dolph Ziggler	Nicholas Nemeth
Drew McIntyre	Andrew Galloway
Epico	Orlando Colón
Evan Bourne	Matthew Korklan
Ezekiel Jackson	Rycklon Stephens
Fandango	Curtis Hussey
Heath Slater	Heath Miller
Jack Swagger	Donald Hager Jr.
Jason Jordan	Nathan Everhart
Jey Uso	Joshua Fatu
Jimmy Uso	Jonathan Fatu
Jinder Mahal	Yuvraj Dhesi
Justin Gabriel	Paul Lloyd Jr.
Kaitlyn	Celeste Bonin
Kofi Kingston	Kofi Sarkodie-Mensah
Maryse	Maryse Ouellet
Michael Tarver	Tyrone Evans
Naomi	Trinity Fatu
Natalya	Natalie Neidhart
Nikki Bella	Stephanie Garcia-Colace
Paige	Saraya-Jade Bevis
Primo Colón	Edwin Colón
Ricardo Rodriguez	Jesús Rodríguez
Richie Steamboat	Richard Blood Jr.
Roman Reigns	Leati Anoaʻi
Rosa Mendes	Milena Roucka
Rusev	Miroslav Barnyashev
Ryback	Ryback Reeves
Serena Deeb	Serena Deeb
Seth Rollins	Colby Lopez
Sin Cara	Jorge Arias
Sheamus	Stephen Farrelly
Summer Rae	Danielle Moinet
Tamina Snuka	Sarona Snuka-Polamalu
Ted DiBiase Jr.	Theodore DiBiase Jr.
Titus O'Neil	Thaddeus Bullard Sr.
Tiffany	Taryn Terrell
Tonga Loa	Tevita Fifita
Tyler Reks	Gabbi Tuft
Tyler Breeze	Mattias Clement
Tyson Kidd	Theodore Wilson
Wade Barrett	Stuart Bennett
Yoshi Tatsu	Naofumi Yamamoto
