= Aron Stevens =

American professional wrestler (born 1982)

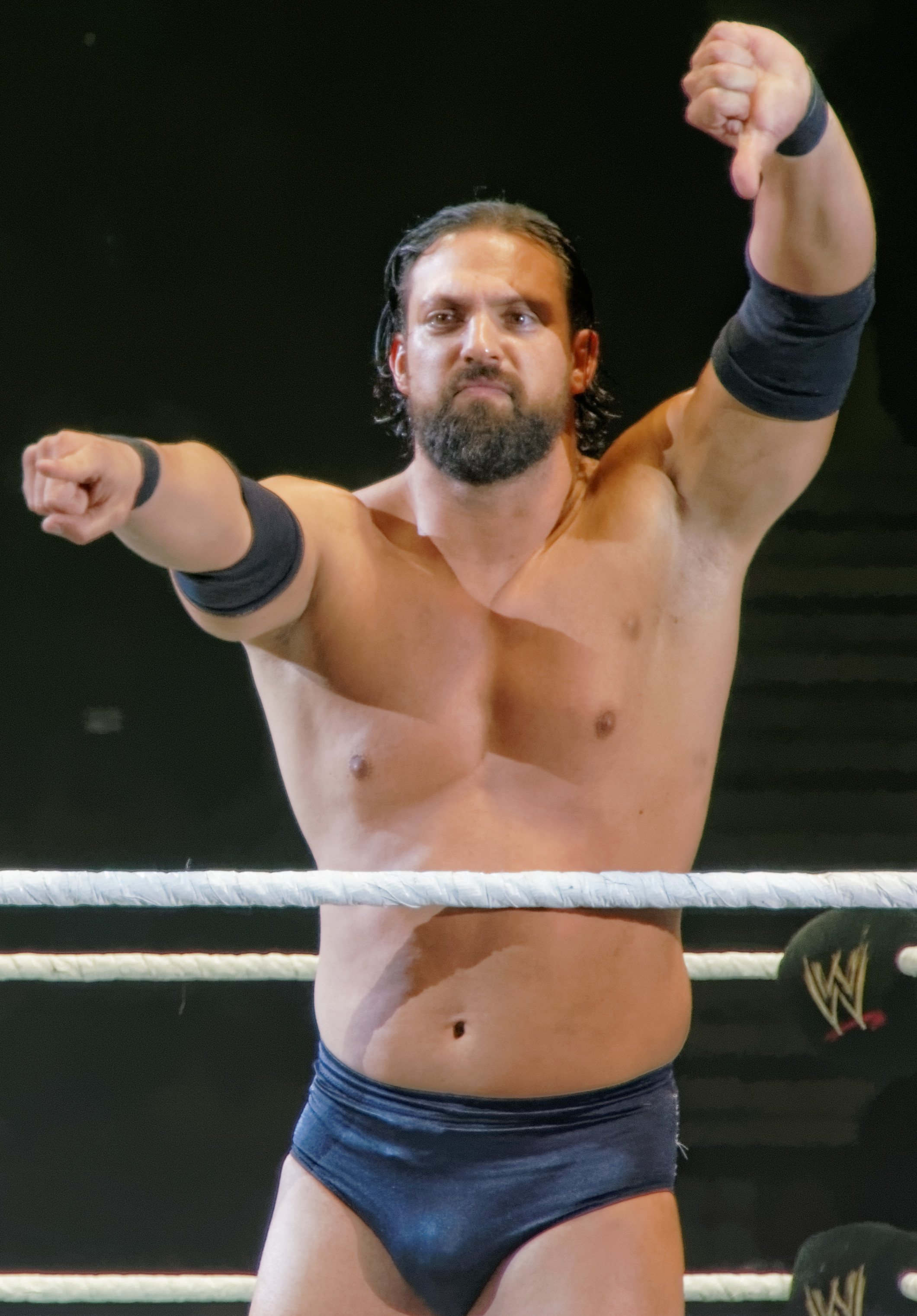
- Aron Stevens, known in the ring as Damien Sandow, in 2013

Personal information
- Born: Aron Steven Haddad; April 3, 1982 (age 44) Worcester, Massachusetts, U.S.

Professional wrestling career
- Ring name(s): Aaron Stevens; Aron Stevens; Aron Rex; Damien Mizdow; Damien Sandow; Easter Bunny; Idol Stevens; Macho Mandow
- Billed height: 6 ft 4 in (1.93 m)
- Billed weight: 247 lb (112 kg)
- Billed from: Palo Alto, California; Louisville, Kentucky; Malibu, California; North Oxford, Massachusetts
- Trained by: Chaotic Wrestling; Killer Kowalski
- Debut: June 23, 2001

Aron Steven Haddad (born April 3, 1982) is an American professional wrestler working as a manager in the National Wrestling Alliance under the name Aron Stevens.

He is best known for wrestling with WWE under the ring name Damien Sandow. He is also known for his time in Total Nonstop Action Wrestling and the independent circuit under the ring name Aron Rex, where he was the first-ever Impact Grand Champion in 2016.

Haddad started wrestling in 2001, and began appearing for WWE in 2002 as Aaron Stevens on Heat. From 2003 to 2006, Haddad wrestled in WWE's developmental territory, Ohio Valley Wrestling (OVW). In 2006, Haddad reappeared on the WWE main roster as Idol Stevens, teaming with KC James and allying with Michelle McCool. In 2007, Haddad was released from WWE, first embarking on a return to OVW, no longer WWE's official developmental territory, in 2008 and then from 2009 to 2010, wrestling in Puerto Rico for World Wrestling Council (WWC).

Signing again with WWE in 2010, he was assigned to a developmental territory, Florida Championship Wrestling, where he adopted the Damien Sandow moniker. In April 2012, Sandow returned to WWE's main roster as an arrogant intellectual. In July 2013, Sandow won the Money in the Bank match for a World Heavyweight Championship opportunity, and became the first to lose the cashed-in title match. In 2014, Sandow became a comedic impersonator, leading up to an alliance with The Miz, serving as his stunt double Damien Mizdow. The duo won the WWE Tag Team Championship before the team split in 2015. He briefly teamed with Curtis Axel, shortly before returning to singles action, and was released in May 2016. He acted in the 2023 independent film The Oath.

== Professional wrestling career ==
=== Early Career (2001–2003) ===
Haddad started training under Killer Kowalski at the age of 16. Three years later, Haddad made his debut as Aaron Stevens on June 23, 2001, with a loss to Chris Harvard in Chaotic Wrestling. In October 2001, Stevens and Edward G. Xtasy (as part of One Night Stand) defeated Little Guido Maritato and Luis Ortiz for the Chaotic Wrestling Tag Team Championship, losing the title two months later to John Walters and Vince Vicallo.

From November 2002 to May 2003, Stevens also wrestled for World Wrestling Alliance (WWA), where he beat Danny Davis for the WWA Heavyweight Championship but lost it a day later to Jonah Adelman. During this period, he also received two singles title shots for the Chaotic Wrestling Heavyweight Championship and one for the Chaotic Wrestling New England Championship, but lost them all.

=== World Wrestling Entertainment (2003-2007) ===
==== Early career (2003) ====
Stevens signed a contract with World Wrestling Entertainment (WWE) after receiving numerous try-out matches on Heat against opponents such as Steven Richards and Maven. Sandow had his WWE's pay-per-view debut match in 2003 at Vengeance as the Easter Bunny in a match with the APA. He also participated in an angle where he had his fingers "broken" by Raven on Heat.

==== Ohio Valley Wrestling (2003–2006) ====
Stevens, now with the tweaked name Aaron "The Idol" Stevens, was assigned to WWE's developmental territory Ohio Valley Wrestling (OVW). At a house show in 2004, Stevens and Nova beat Chris Cage and Tank Toland to win the OVW Southern Tag Team Championship.

On January 4, 2006, Stevens won the OVW Television Championship after replacing Ken Doane in a three-way match with Brent Albright and then-champion CM Punk. Doane was injured halfway through the match and Stevens came out to replace him. At the March 8 television taping, Paul Burchill cost Stevens the Television Championship against Seth Skyfire.

==== Idol Stevens (2006–2007) ====
On August 4, 2006, Stevens made his SmackDown! debut as Idol Stevens when he was introduced (along with KC James) by Michelle McCool as one of her favorite "teacher's pets". The two went on to defeat Funaki and Scotty 2 Hotty with the help of McCool. The following week, Stevens and James defeated WWE Tag Team Champions Paul London and Brian Kendrick in a non-title match. On the August 18 show, Stevens and James ambushed the Tag Team Champions.

The two teams began feuding, with London and Kendrick bringing in Ashley Massaro to counteract McCool. The feud briefly encompassed the team of Jamie Noble and Kid Kash, who also wanted a Tag Team title shot. Stevens and James got their WWE Tag Team Championship shot at No Mercy on October 8, but failed to win the titles. Soon after, both Stevens and James were taken off television and sent back to Ohio Valley Wrestling.

After being removed from the SmackDown! roster when Michelle McCool was hospitalized, Stevens returned to OVW. He lost to Charles Evans upon his return and no mention of his tag team venture with KC James was made. On March 14, 2007, he defeated Paul Burchill to win the OVW Heavyweight Championship. On May 9, after title defences against Cody Runnels and Mike Mondo, Burchill defeated Stevens to regain the OVW Championship. The championship was vacated and Stevens lost to Jay Bradley in a three-way match including Burchill. On June 8, Stevens defeated Burchill in a Number One OVW Heavyweight Contendership match.

He got his title match in a three-way match, again including champion Jay Bradley and Paul Burchill. The match was not only for Bradley's title, but also Stevens's car and Burchill's house. Bradley defeated both men and won all the stakes. His last match for OVW before his release was a two-ring steel cage flag match, which, along with Al Snow, Atlas DaBone, Chet The Jett and Colt Cabana, he defeated Michael W. Kruel, Ramon, Raul, The Belgium Brawler and Vladimir Kozlov.

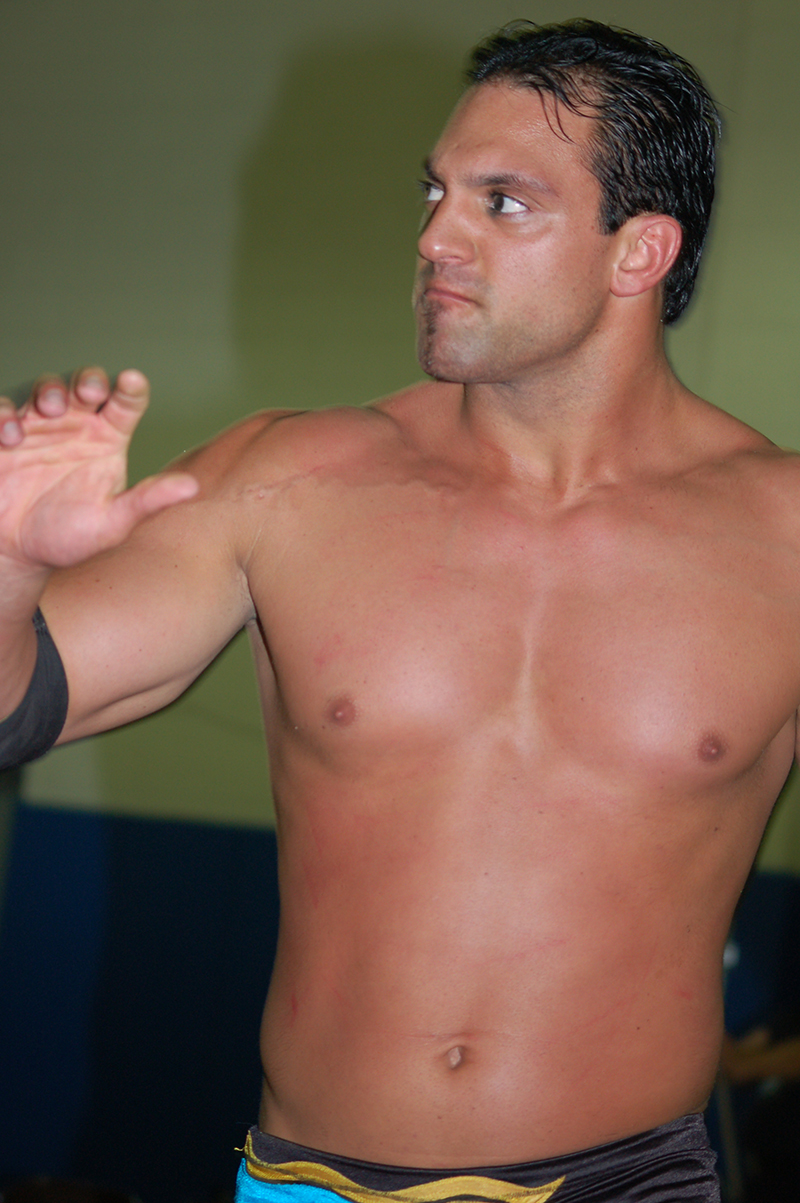
Idol Stevens in 2008

Stevens was officially released by WWE on August 6, 2007.

=== National Wrestling Alliance (2008) ===
Stevens made his return to the independent circuit at NWA 60th Anniversary Show losing to Mike DiBiase II in a match for the NWA North American Heavyweight Championship. He appeared for XCW Wrestling Mid-West and Derby City Wrestling for the next few months before re-signing with OVW. On November 7, 2008, he lost to Steve Boz at A Tribute Fit For The King, a tribute show for Jerry Lawler.

=== Return to OVW (2008–2009) ===
In February 2008, OVW ceased to be WWE's developmental territory. Stevens returned to OVW on November 12, 2008, losing to OVW Heavyweight Champion Anthony Bravado in a non-title bout. The following week, the two were featured in a triple threat match with Jacob Duncan that went off the air before the match could finish. Stevens and Bravado faced off again in a match for the title on November 26, which Stevens won, becoming a two-time champion. On December 3, 2008, he teamed up with U-Gene to take part in OVW Southern Tag Team Championship number one contendership tournament, in round one they defeated Theta Lampda Psi. A week later, they lost to Anthony Bravado and The Buck. Stevens lost the title to Vaughn Lilas at the January 14, 2009 television taping. In February 2009, he lost to Mike Mondo in an OVW Television Championship match which also included Johnny Punch. His last match for OVW was on February 11, a rematch for the championship which Mondo again won.

=== World Wrestling Council (2009–2010) ===
Idol returned to Puerto Rico, but in a different promotion, the World Wrestling Council, where he was the "protegido" of Jose Chaparro and a member of the "American Family". He debuted on February 28, 2009, defeating Angel. He defeated BJ for the WWC Puerto Rico Heavyweight Championship, before losing it to Shane Sewell. On August 15, 2009, Stevens and Shawn Spears defeated Thunder and Lightning to become the new WWC World Tag Team Champions. Stevens later feuded with Shawn Spears, which ended at Euphoria 2010. Stevens won the WWC Tag Team Champion with King Tonga Jr. by defeating Thunder and Lightning.

On October 31, Stevens and Spears lost the Tag Team Championship back to Thunder and Lightning. On February 20, 2010, Chicano named Stevens his new Tag Team Championship partner to replace Bryan. On March 13, Thunder and Lightning defeated Stevens and Chicano to win the titles. After Stevens regained the titles with King Tonga Jr., the duo lost them to Los Aerios (Carlitos and Hiram Tua) on April 24. Stevens regained the Tag Team Championship from Los Aerios on June 11, this time teaming with Abbad, and lost it to Thunder and Lightning in a three-way match involving BJ and Chicano on July 11. His last match for WWC before signing with WWE came on July 31, losing to Joe Don Smith.

=== Return to WWE (2010-2016) ===
==== Florida Championship Wrestling (2010–2012) ====
On July 14, 2010, it was reported that Stevens had signed a new developmental deal with WWE, and was assigned to their developmental territory Florida Championship Wrestling (FCW). He changed his ring name to Damien Sandow (sharing the surname of the Gold Dust Trio's Billy Sandow and the "father of modern bodybuilding" Eugen Sandow), while adopting a new militant gimmick. On December 3, Sandow won the FCW Florida Tag Team Championship with Titus O'Neill by defeating Xavier Woods and Mason Ryan in a match for the vacant championship. They lost the championship to Richie Steamboat and Seth Rollins on March 25, 2011. After losing the title, Sandow turned on O'Neill and joined the group formed by Lucky Cannon, Aksana, and Maxine. Following the dissolution of the group, Sandow adopted the gimmick of a verbose intellectual. Then, he beat Rollins on September 22 to win the FCW Jack Brisco 15 Championship. On January 13, 2012, Sandow lost the FCW 15 Championship to Steamboat.

==== Main roster debut and Rhodes Scholars (2012–2013) ====
Haddads main roster character upon his return, Damien Sandow, was described as a "braggart, condescending intellectual heel". After his second WWE run ended, Haddad said that his initial purpose in building the 'Intellectual Savior of the Unwashed Masses' character was "to do anything I could to stand out". Given "freedom to execute the character", Haddad stopped shaving, began wearing a bathrobe (proposed by Dusty Rhodes for a robe like Lou Thesz's) to "present" his pink trunks when the robe was taken off, and using the "Hallelujah Chorus" as his entrance music. Haddad also credited Mike Rotunda, Triple H and Brian James for their help in guiding him.

On the April 6, 2012 episode of SmackDown, Sandow appeared in a pre-taped interview denouncing popular culture and extolling his virtues. After weeks of vignettes, Sandow made his WWE in-ring return under the new gimmick on the May 4 episode of SmackDown, but refused to compete against Derrick Bateman, claiming that the audience would neither learn nor benefit from him facing an inferior opponent. On the May 18 episode of SmackDown, Sandow refused to wrestle against Yoshi Tatsu, but Tatsu accused Sandow of being a coward and Sandow assaulted him. On the May 25 episode of SmackDown, Sandow defeated Tatsu in his debut match. The following week, he refused to face Ezekiel Jackson, and despite Jackson forcing the match to begin, Sandow won. On the June 8 episode of SmackDown, Sandow went to attack Hornswoggle but was intercepted by Tyson Kidd before he could do so. The following week on SmackDown, Sandow defeated Kidd.

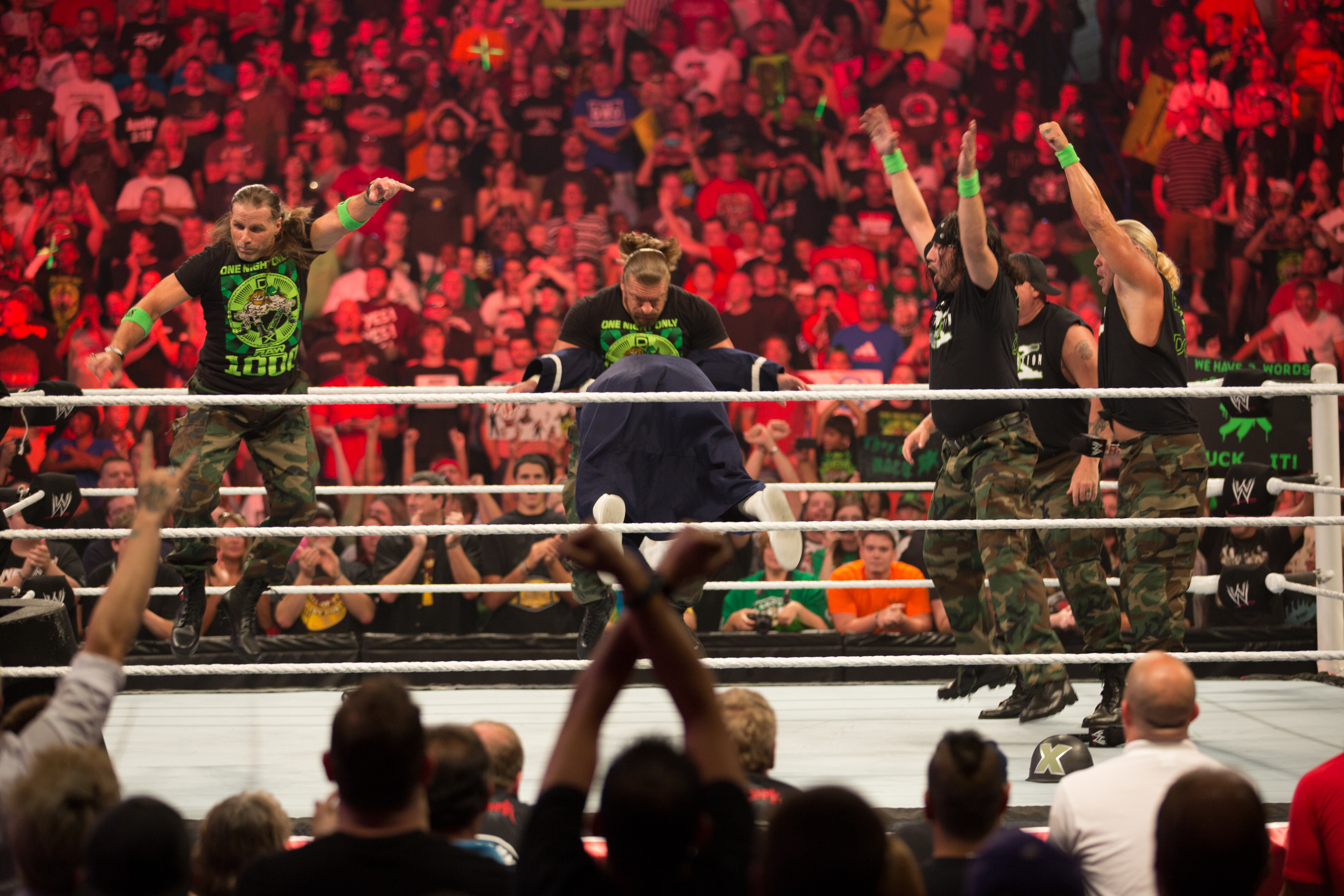
Sandow being "martyred" by D-Generation X at Raw 1000

On the June 29 episode of SmackDown, Sandow defeated Zack Ryder to qualify for the World Heavyweight Championship Money in the Bank ladder match at Money in the Bank. However, the match was won by Dolph Ziggler. On July 23 at Raw 1000, Sandow interrupted D-Generation X (DX) and claimed that their sophomoric and disgusting behaviour had brainwashed society; he also declared that he would be a martyr if DX disposed of him, and DX assaulted him regardless. Sandow then began a feud with Brodus Clay on the July 30 episode of Raw, attacking Clay when he laughed at a video of Sandow's beatdown at the hands of DX. Sandow and Clay finally faced off on the August 20 episode of Raw, where Sandow won after a roll-up, but was attacked by Clay after the match. On the August 31 SmackDown, Sandow had his first singles loss after being intentionally counted out against World Heavyweight Champion Sheamus, who would later hand Sandow his first pinfall loss in October.

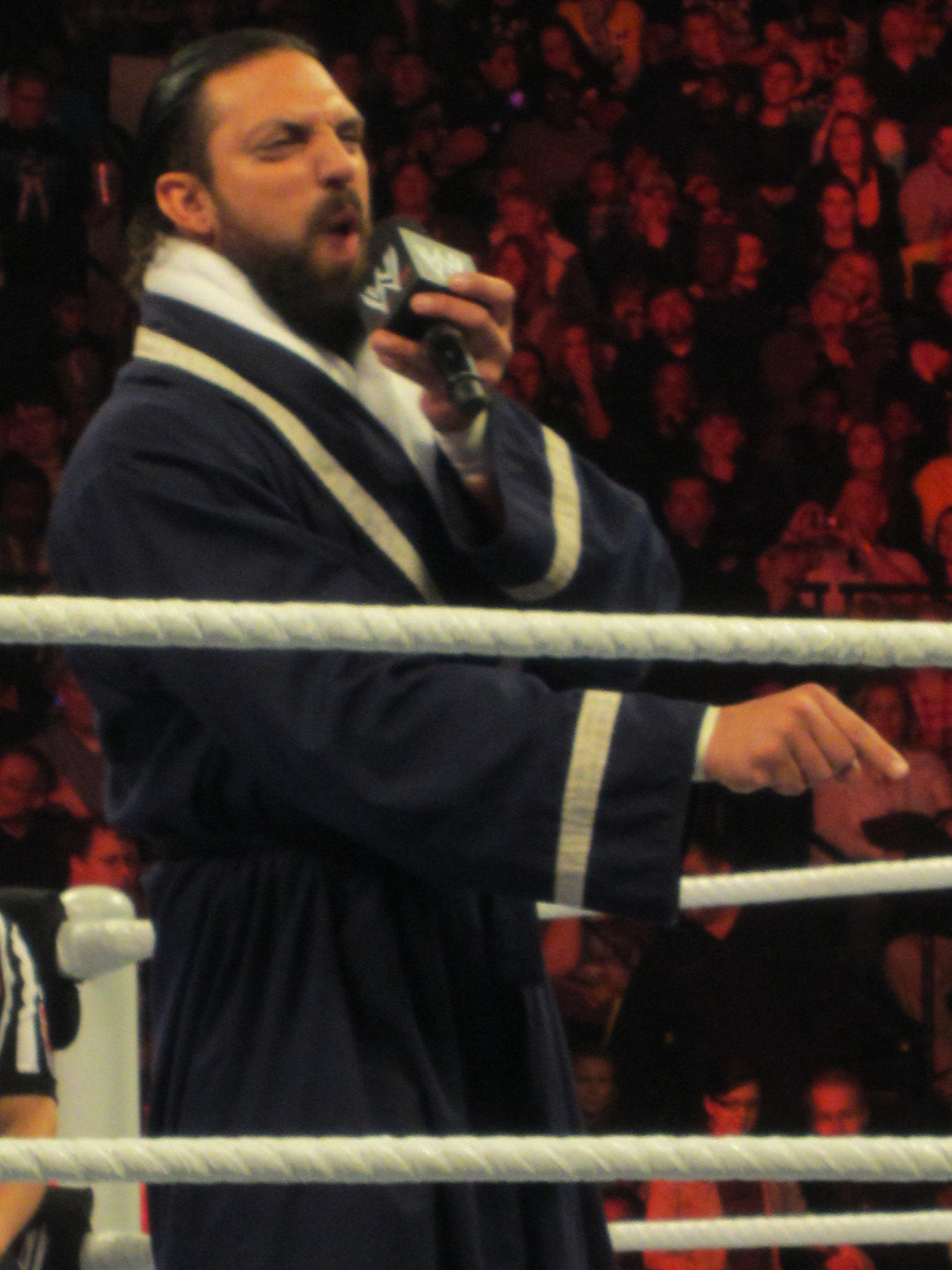
Damien Sandow addressing the crowd in his robe

On the September 21 SmackDown, Sandow aligned himself with Cody Rhodes, and they started a feud with WWE Tag Team Champions Team Hell No (Daniel Bryan and Kane). The duo, which adopted the team name of Team Rhodes Scholars (a play on the Rhodes Scholarship), entered a tournament a week later on SmackDown, and defeated the Usos to advance. Team Rhodes Scholars defeated Santino Marella and Zack Ryder in the semi-finals, and then Rey Mysterio and Sin Cara in the finals to earn a shot at the tag titles. Team Rhodes Scholars got their title opportunity against Team Hell No on October 28 at Hell in a Cell, where they won by disqualification, thus Team Hell No retained the titles. This led to a title rematch on the November 14 episode of Main Event, which Team Hell No won. During the match, Rhodes suffered several legitimate injuries, placing their partnership on hold.

On the November 23 episode of SmackDown, Sandow unsuccessfully challenged Kofi Kingston for the Intercontinental Championship, his first singles title opportunity in WWE. From December 2012, Sandow began a regular segment in which he unsuccessfully searched for an 'apprentice' by quizzing members of the audience. Sandow and Rhodes reunited on the December 10 episode of Raw and won a fatal four-way tag team elimination match, earning them the right to face Rey Mysterio and Sin Cara in a number one contender Tables match at TLC: Tables, Ladders & Chairs six days later, which Team Rhodes Scholars won. Team Rhodes Scholars received their title shot on the following episode of Main Event, but were again defeated by Team Hell No. On the January 7, 2013, episode of Raw, Team Rhodes Scholars defeated Team Hell No in a non-title match to earn another shot at the WWE Tag Team Championship. The title rematch took place on January 27 at the Royal Rumble, where Team Rhodes Scholars once again failed to capture the tag team titles.

On the February 1 episode of SmackDown, Sandow and Rhodes briefly dissolved Team Rhodes Scholars while remaining "best friends", only to reunite on February 17 at the pre-show of Elimination Chamber in a loss to the team of Brodus Clay and Tensai. Sandow and Rhodes then aligned themselves with The Bella Twins in a feud against Tons of Funk (Clay and Tensai) and the Funkadactyls (Cameron and Naomi). The two teams were originally booked to face each other in an eight-person mixed tag team match on April 7 at WrestleMania 29, but their match was cut due to time constraints. The match instead took place the following night on Raw, where Tons of Funk and the Funkadactyls emerged victorious.

==== Sir Money in the Bank and demotion to lower-tier status (2013–2014) ====
On the May 15 episode of NXT, Sandow unsuccessfully challenged Big E Langston for the NXT Championship. While Sandow hosted a series of mental challenges on SmackDown, Sheamus repeatedly interrupted Sandow and tried to solve the challenges. However, when Sheamus failed to solve the puzzles, he instead resorted to physical violence by attacking Sandow. On June 16, during the Payback pre-show, Sandow was defeated by Sheamus. The following night on Raw, Team Rhodes Scholars defeated Sheamus in a handicap match after Sandow pinned him with a roll-up. The rivalry culminated in a Dublin Street Fight on the June 28 SmackDown, where Sheamus defeated Sandow.

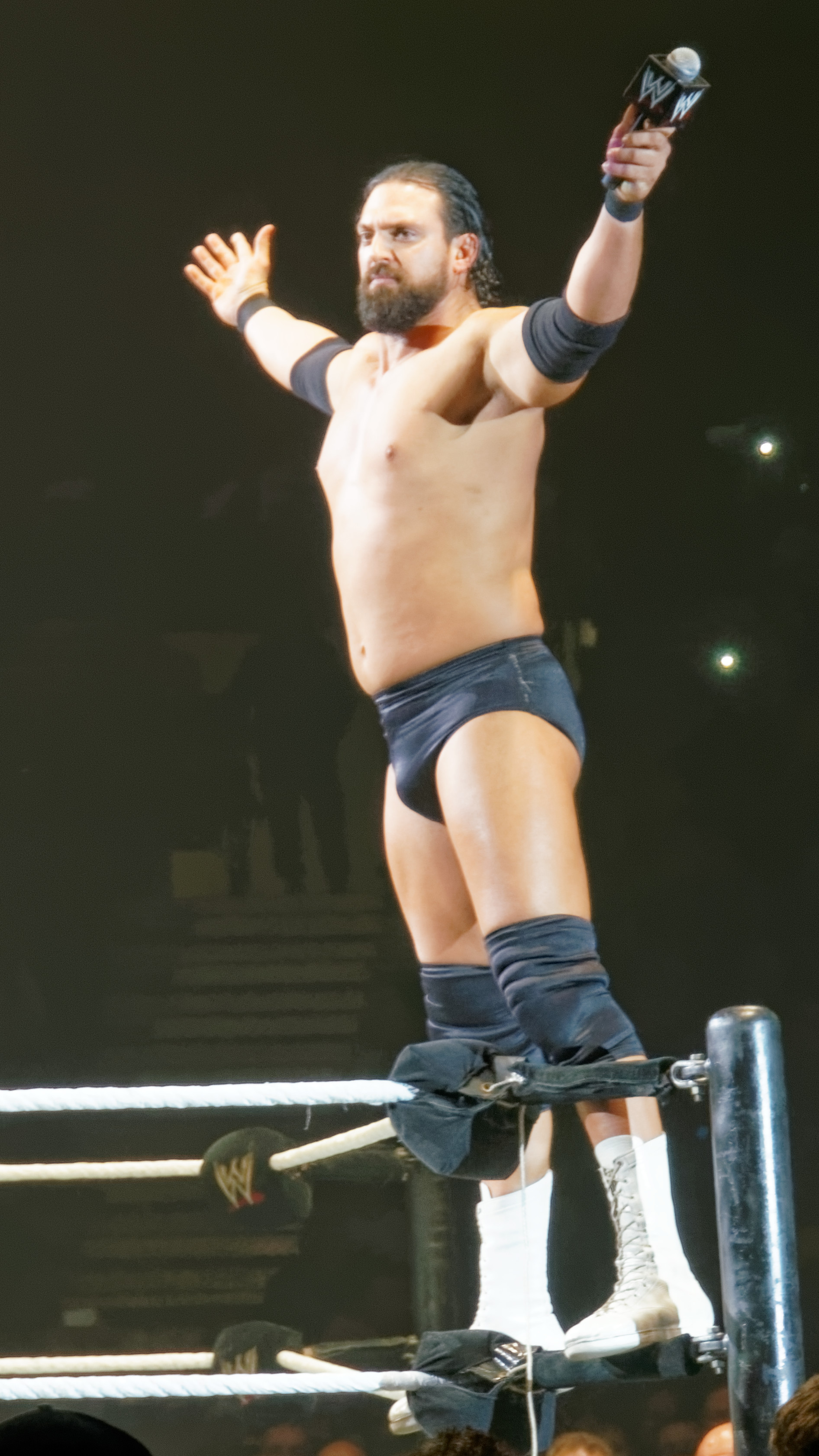
Sandow in November 2013

The July 14 Money in the Bank pay-per-view marked the beginning of the end for Team Rhodes Scholars. Both Rhodes and Sandow entered the World Heavyweight Championship Money in the Bank ladder match; just as Rhodes was about to win the match, Sandow threw Rhodes off the ladder and retrieved the briefcase himself to earn the opportunity to challenge for the World Heavyweight Championship at any time of his choosing within the next year. Despite winning the briefcase, Sandow went on to lose many matches before his cash-in, with a total of 1 win and 12 losses on Raw and SmackDown. The split of Team Rhodes Scholars was confirmed the next night on Raw when Rhodes attacked Sandow. Rhodes dominated the feud between him and Sandow; throwing Sandow's briefcase into the Gulf of Mexico, which forced Sandow to introduce a new custom-made briefcase; thwarting Sandow's attempt to cash-in on a vulnerable Alberto Del Rio; and defeating Sandow twice in singles matches, one of which was at SummerSlam.

After moving on from his feud with Rhodes, Sandow went on to lose to the likes of R-Truth, Santino Marella and Dolph Ziggler. On the October 28 Raw, Sandow confronted World Heavyweight Champion John Cena; stating his belief that Cena's arm was still injured following Cena's match against Alberto Del Rio at Hell in a Cell, Sandow assaulted Cena's arm and then cashed in his Money in the Bank contract, but Cena won the match by pinfall. This made Sandow the second wrestler to fail to win a title upon cash-in (after Cena himself), and the first to lose a cash-in outright. Forbes wrote in 2016 that Sandow's 2012 intellectual character "quickly won over the fans and showed his potential as one of the top heels on the main roster", but his "career never recovered" from losing the Money in the Bank cash-in. Haddad later said, "I absolutely did think I was going to take that [next] big step" after his character won Money in the Bank, but "circumstances dictated otherwise". Despite being scripted to lose to Cena, Haddad was "very proud" that he delivered "a performance of a lifetime" that night.

After Sandow's cash-in, he was noted to have become more generic as he stopped doing cartwheels and started wearing plain black ring attire. Sandow's misfortune continued when he challenged Intercontinental Champion Big E Langston to a title match at TLC and lost. In January 2014, Sandow entered the 2014 Royal Rumble and was the first eliminated, courtesy of CM Punk. He then started a losing streak that lasted until May, which included him losing to the likes of Darren Young, being pinned in an eight-man tag match, and losing to Sin Cara in one minute.

==== Impersonations and popularity rise (2014–2015) ====
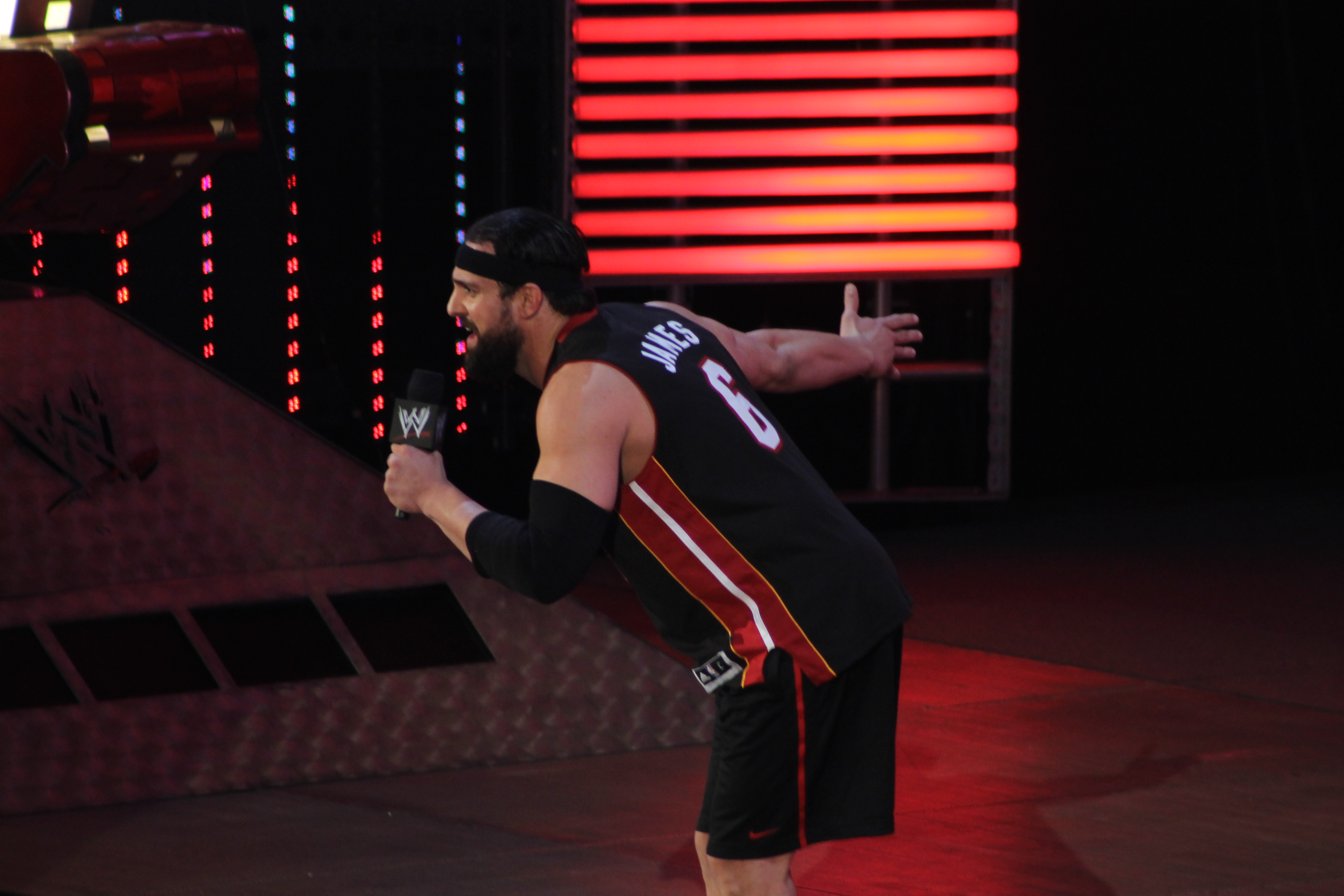
Sandow impersonating LeBron James in mid-2014

On the April 28 Raw, Sandow dressed as Magneto to confront guest star Hugh Jackman (who plays Wolverine in the X-Men film series) and Dolph Ziggler, which resulted in Sandow being attacked by both Jackman and Ziggler. On the May 12 Raw and its pre-show, Sandow started delivering worked shoot comments displaying his apparent dissatisfaction at his position in WWE, resulting in his microphone being turned off. Sandow later made comments with allusions to being handcuffed.

Sandow then transitioned into a comedic impersonator, and from May 20 he started to dress as a different character every week, sometimes wrestling as them. These characters included Sherlock Holmes, Bruce Springsteen, Abraham Lincoln, Paul Revere, a rapper called D-Sizzle and an interpretive dancer. He also mimicked other wrestlers, such as Shawn Michaels, Bret Hart, and Vince McMahon. Haddad reflected after his release that when he was "dressing up as someone new every week", "other guys said I should be doing something else", but back then he was willing to "go with it" to capture "attention", though he said, "I didn't know where or how it was going to end up".

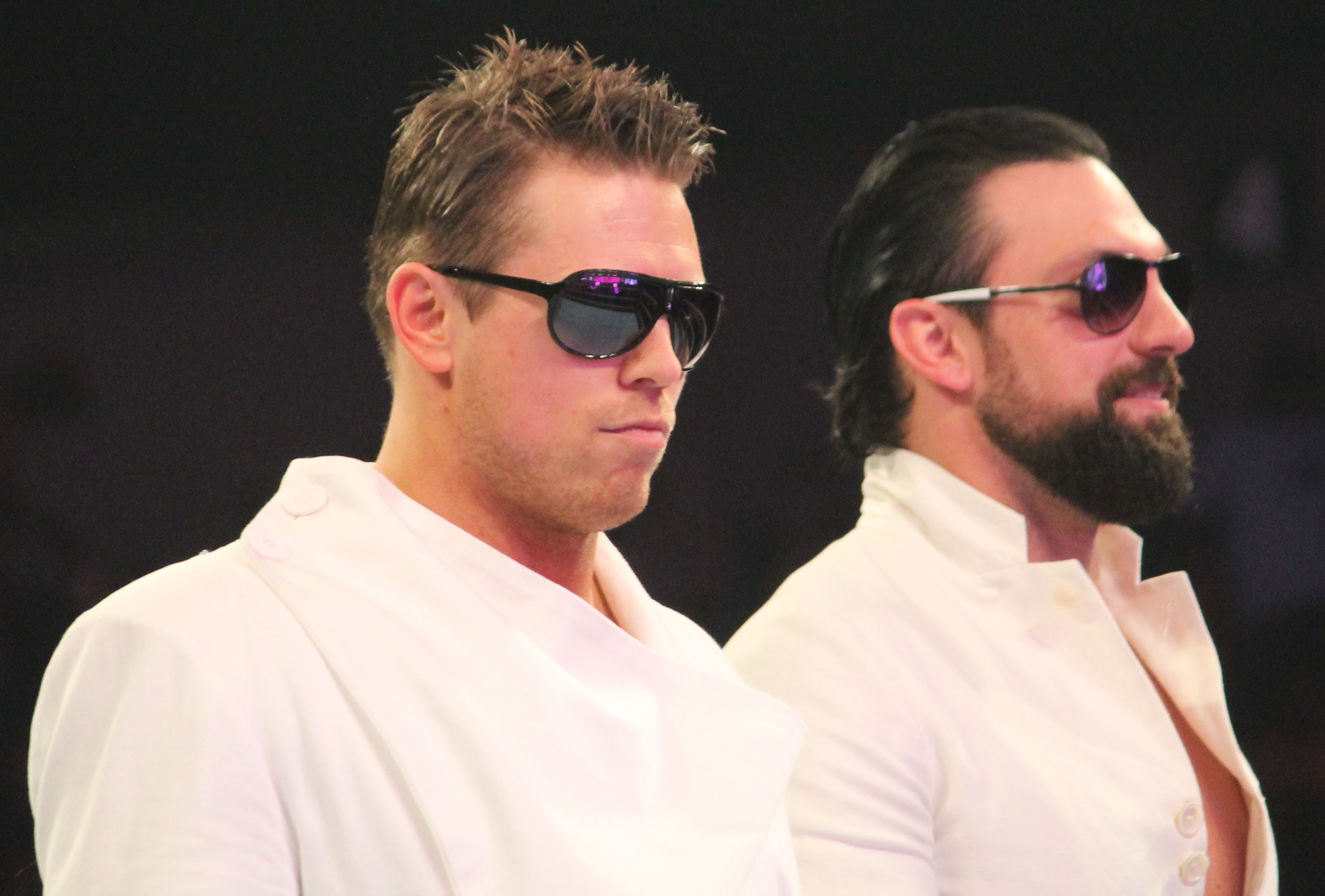
The renamed Damien Mizdow (right) as the stunt double for The Miz

From August, Sandow formed an alliance with The Miz, whose persona was that of an arrogant movie star. Sandow was 'hired' by Miz to be his "stunt double", which initially entailed him taking bumps for Miz and later expanded to him mimicking every move Miz made during his matches, as well as Miz's mannerisms when not wrestling. During this period, Sandow's ring name was tweaked to Damien Mizdow to reflect his new role. Haddad later detailed how he was initially not aware whether being the stunt double was a "one-time thing" like his previous impersonations or a long-term storyline, and that WWE only decided to make it a long-term storyline "about two or three weeks" into the Mizdow act. Haddad also said that mimicking Miz's actions in the ring was a "completely on the whim" improvisation, with him and the Miz never rehearsing any of their actions.

At Night of Champions in September, Mizdow's interference helped Miz win the Intercontinental Championship from Dolph Ziggler. Miz lost his title back to Ziggler the following night in a rematch on Raw. Mizdow's antics soon endeared him to WWE fans and he became popular with live audiences, who would often boo Miz during matches and chant "We want Mizdow!".

"[...] reminding me of Damien Mizdow... an unlikely hero getting over by sheer force of entertainment".

— Pro Wrestling Dot Net analyst Darren Gutteridge in 2015

At Survivor Series, Mizdow and Miz won the WWE Tag Team Championship after defeating defending champions Gold and Stardust, The Usos and Los Matadores in Fatal 4-Way tag team match. This was Mizdow's first championship in WWE. By this time, Mizdow had become one of the most popular wrestlers in WWE.

On the December 29 episode of Raw, they lost the titles to The Usos. On the same night, they were defeated by the debuting Ascension. Miz and Mizdow then began to show dissension, with Miz becoming angry at Mizdow's positive crowd reactions and accusing Mizdow of trying to 'upstage' him. On the February 2 episode of Raw, The Miz relegated Mizdow from being a stunt double to a personal assistant.

Mizdow turned face when he finally split away from The Miz at WrestleMania 31 in the Andre the Giant Memorial Battle Royal, but the "red hot babyface in waiting" (as described by Forbes) was the last wrestler eliminated, courtesy of Big Show. Haddad described WrestleMania 31 being one of his "favorite memories in the WWE", due to "feeling the surge of 83,000 people chanting" for him when he split from Miz, a "genuine, 100-percent real emotional response on a grand stage" that would eclipse any "award" or "accolade". Post-WrestleMania, Mizdow (now accompanied by The Miz's The Marine 4: Moving Target co-star Summer Rae) then feuded with The Miz over the next several weeks, trading victories on Raw before challenging Miz to a match for the rights to the Miz brand on the April 20 episode. The Miz won the match after Summer Rae betrayed Mizdow by raking him in the eyes, allowing Miz to hit the Skull-Crushing Finale and pick up the win. As a result of the loss, Mizdow returned to his former name, Damien Sandow. The manner of the breakup between Miz and Sandow was extremely criticized by critics for poor storyline writing which made Sandow look like a fool post-WrestleMania and also diminishing the feud to an "afterthought".

"I think it's just a case of someone in the company seeing [Sandow] as a comedy guy and nothing more. The audience tried to tell them that they wanted to see him in a better role but were ignored".

— Pro Wrestling Insider analyst Mike Johnson's opinion of WWE's booking of Sandow, in June 2015

Returning to the Damien Sandow ring name on the April 27 episode of Raw, Sandow was thanking fans for their support when he was interrupted by Curtis Axel. Sandow began to parrot after Axel, who had been mimicking Hulk Hogan. Sandow won the ensuing scuffle with a Hogan leg drop. On the April 30 episode of SmackDown, Sandow parroted ring announcer JoJo before facing and defeating Axel. In May 2015, Sandow began impersonating Randy Savage as Macho Mandow, while he and Axel suffered attacks by The Ascension to start a feud. Mandow and Axel's alliance was known as The Meta Powers, a parody of The Mega Powers. At Payback, the Meta Powers were defeated by the Ascension. Various critics expressed disappointment that Sandow was still restricted to doing comedic impersonations. The Meta Powers stopped their respective impersonations from July 24, after WWE severed ties with Hulk Hogan.

==== Final storylines and departure (2015–2016) ====
The end of The Meta Powers marked a further decline in Sandow's fortunes. The Wrestling Observer wrote that "Sandow had been used sparingly since then, usually in an enhancement role or in battle royals"; while PWInsider described that "Sandow never recovered nor had a regular storyline beyond that point", yet "his appearance would get a big reaction from fans at live events". From July to October 2015, Sandow never wrestled a televised match, being restricted to wrestling dark matches or at live events.

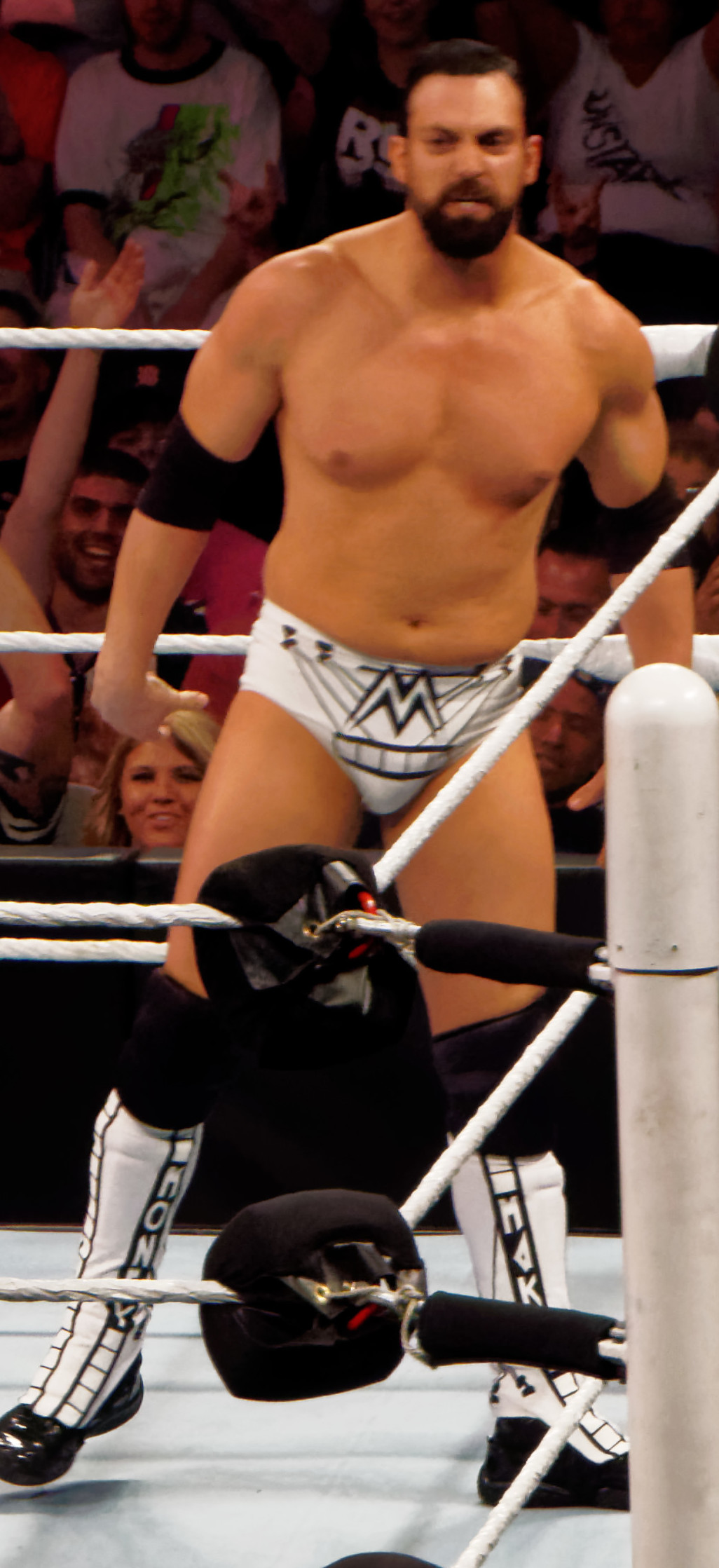
Mizdow in March 2015

Sandow returned to television on the November 11, 2015 episode of Main Event as his original "Intellectual Savior" character, defeating Heath Slater. Following that, Sandow never won another televised match for WWE. At the 2016 Royal Rumble kickoff, Sandow and Darren Young failed to qualify for the Royal Rumble match when they lost a four-way tag team match. In February, after Sandow posted a tribute to his grandmother on Twitter, possibly indicating her recent death, WWE allowed Sandow to take time off to spend time with family. At WrestleMania 32, Sandow was quickly eliminated from the Andre the Giant Memorial Battle Royal by Shaquille O'Neal. Sandow returned to Raw on April 25, but his match against Baron Corbin never started due to Dolph Ziggler attacking Corbin; with Pro Wrestling Torch describing that Sandow's appearance "got one of the best reactions of the night". Corbin defeated Sandow in under two minutes on that week's SmackDown. On the May 2 episode of Raw, Sandow competed in a battle royal for a shot at the WWE United States Championship, but was eliminated early in the match; the Wrestling Observer wrote that "his elimination was one of the louder reactions in the match". Then, Sandow's final two televised matches for WWE saw him lose to Titus O'Neil on Main Event and Darren Young on Superstars; Sandow wrestled the latter match as a heel.

"... these releases bum us out a little, especially Sandow's. The guy will forever be remembered as wasted WWE talent."

— The Birmingham News writer Ben Flanagan in May 2016

On May 6, 2016, Sandow was released from WWE. His release caused him to become a top 5 Twitter trend in the United States. Mike Johnson of PWInsider described Sandow's release as "mind-boggling" and "shocking" due to "the level of popularity that Sandow has with fans". Johnson listed more of Sandow's positives: "Sandow had size, could talk", and "no matter what role he was in, he received a big reaction": "fans recognized was vastly underutilized by the company and pushed for him to have a bigger role". Meanwhile, the Wrestling Observer described Sandow as "a popular undercard wrestler who always got bigger crowd reactions than his push", while Pro Wrestling Dot Net reported that Sandow, a "popular undercard wrestler", "has been in career tailspin mode for some time" up to his release. Forbes lamented in reference to the releases of Sandow and Wade Barrett: "... it's a hard pill to swallow when you realize that two stars who could have been World champion never got the chance to".

Rolling Stone interviewed Haddad within a week of his release. Haddad was "grateful" for a "great" second run in WWE where he "traveled the world" and "had a bunch of fun". Given that his main aim as a performer was "to get the audience to feel something, to evoke some kind of emotion", Haddad had no regrets leaving since he felt he "took the audience through the whole spectrum of emotions in four years": first "there was an extreme feeling of dislike towards" the Sandow character upon its debut, and years later, the Mizdow character was cheered to a point that "there are guys that are in the main event that don't get cheers like that". As for his release, Haddad was "not really" surprised as he thought he "had gone through the gamut" with the impersonator character. Describing himself as an empathetic individual, Haddad had "no problem" with WWE giving other wrestlers television time at his expense so that they could "show their craft" and become popular, while he was already popular whatever "spot" WWE put him. Although there were several alternate options of using Haddad, including "repackaging" his character, "doing a parody of current events", or becoming a commentator, ultimately, Haddad did not "fit" into WWE's plans.

=== Return to the independent circuit (2016, 2019–present) ===
After being released from WWE, Haddad announced on his official Twitter account that he would once again be taking independent bookings, returning to his Aron Stevens ring name. He said he "took select dates" for wrestling, wanting to "say thank you to the fans", "to meet them, and have a chance to talk to them". His first independent appearance was on June 11 at a co-promoted show organized by Global Force Wrestling (GFW) and WrestlePro, where he defeated Colt Cabana. Haddad also made appearances at Warriors of Wrestling and Tier 1 Wrestling events. On June 14, 2016, Haddad signed for What Culture Pro Wrestling (WCPW) and was scheduled to debut the weekend of July 27–28, 2016. He was victorious in his debut match, where he defeated Doug Williams to become the #1 contender for the WCPW Championship.

After a two-year hiatus, he made his return to the ring in July 2019 under a new gimmick, the Millennial Slayer. On July 18, Sandow wrestled his first match back, at a Battle Arts Academy show under the name Aron Stevens.

=== Total Nonstop Action Wrestling/Impact Wrestling (2016–2017) ===
On August 10, 2016, Total Nonstop Action Wrestling (TNA) released a promo teasing the acquisition of Stevens. On the August 11, 2016 episode of Impact Wrestling, Stevens made his debut under the ring name Aron Rex, cutting a promo in the ring and confronting the Impact World Heavyweight, X Division and King of the Mountain Champion Lashley at the end of the show. A week later, he announced that he would be the special guest referee in the No. 1 contender's match between Ethan Carter III and Drew Galloway. At the end of that match, he was attacked by Galloway over his frustrations due to losing the match. The next week, after Galloway explained his actions, Rex interrupted him and brawled with him before being separated by officials. Rex then entered himself in the inaugural Impact Grand Championship tournament and had his debut match on the September 15 episode of Impact Wrestling, defeating Trevor Lee. The next week, he defeated Eli Drake in the semi-finals and faced rival Drew Galloway in the finals of the tournament at Bound for Glory. Galloway was replaced by Eddie Edwards due to an injury. Rex won the tournament and the championship by split decision. On December 1 episode of Impact Wrestling, during an Open Challenge for the championship, Moose defeated Rex. Moose successfully retained his title against Rex in a rematch the following week.

After a hiatus, Rex returned on the January 12, 2017 episode of Impact Wrestling debuting a Liberace-inspired character, with a new clean shaven look and sporting plucked eyebrows, lip gloss, a fur coat, naked trunks and oversized rings on all fingers, along with Rockstar Spud as his new manager. On January 19 episode of Impact, Rex and Spud defeated the team of Robbie E and Swoggle in his last professional wrestling match to date. On April 4, 2017, Stevens announced that he was no longer with the now renamed Impact Wrestling and that he would be taking a break from wrestling to focus on acting.

=== National Wrestling Alliance (2019–present) ===
On the October 15, 2019 episode of National Wrestling Alliance's NWA Powerrr, Sandow announced he was returning to the ring and would be wrestling again under the Aron Stevens name. On December 14, at Into the Fire, Stevens defeated previous champion Colt Cabana and Ricky Starks in a triple threat match to win the NWA National Championship. On September 29, 2020, Stevens lost the title to Trevor Murdoch.

In September 2020, Haddad was made the booker for NWA member promotion Championship Wrestling from Hollywood. On November 11, Stevens and J. R. Kratos defeated Eli Drake and James Storm to win the NWA World Tag Team Championship. On March 21, 2021, at Back For The Attack, Stevens lost to Nick Aldis in an NWA Worlds Heavyweight Championship match. On June 6, at When Our Shadows Fall, Stevens and Kratos successfully defended their titles in a three-way tag team match against The War Kings (Jax Dane and Crimson) and Strictly Business (Thom Latimer and Chris Adonis). On August 29, at the NWA 73rd Anniversary Show, they lost the titles to La Rebelión (Bestia 666 and Mecha Wolf 450). On December 4, at Hard Times 2, Stevens and Kratos failed to beat The OGK (Matt Taven and Mike Bennett) for the ROH World Tag Team Championship.

On March 19, 2022, during night one of the Crockett Cup, Stevens teamed with The Blue Meanie to compete in the namesake tournament, losing to The Dirty Sexy Boys (Dirty Dango and JTG) in the first round. On the April 26 episode of NWA Powerrr, Stevens fought Trevor Murdoch in an attempt to beat some respect out of him, but was defeated. The following week, he formally announced his retirement from professional wrestling. On June 11, at Alwayz Ready, Stevens lost to Murdoch in what was dubbed "Aron Stevens' Swan Song". After the match, he grabbed the mic and told the fans, "You're welcome!" Since his in-ring retirement, Stevens has remained with the NWA as the on-screen manager of the tag team Blunt Force Trauma, composed of Rodney Mack and Marshe Rockett, as well as an agent.

== Other media ==
Haddad has appeared on Xavier Woods' gaming YouTube channel UpUpDownDown. As of 2019, Haddad co-hosts a wrestling podcast titled On the Mat. In 2020, Haddad made a cameo in the NBC sitcom A.P. Bio. In May 2023, Haddad was revealed to have a cameo in the third season of the Netflix sketch comedy series I Think You Should Leave with Tim Robinson. In December 2024 and June 2025, Haddad appeared on the Fox News late-night show Gutfeld! as a panellist, with both appearances featuring fellow pro-wrestler Tyrus (Brodus Clay in WWE) as the stand-in host.

Haddad also appears in the following video games:

Year	Title	Notes
2012	WWE '13	As downloadable content
2013	WWE 2K14	
2014	WWE SuperCard	Mobile game
2014	WWE 2K15	
2015	WWE 2K16	

== Personal life ==
Haddad is Catholic and has attended mass at the EWTN chapel. He is also a Freemason.

Haddad practiced Wah Lum Kung Fu from the ages of 5 to 16, when he abandoned it in favor of wrestling.

Haddad has been taking acting classes, including Shakespearean acting. He is considering acting in films, but has not ruled out television or stage acting.

== Championships and accomplishments ==
- Chaotic Wrestling
  - Chaotic Wrestling Heavyweight Championship (1 time)
  - Chaotic Wrestling Tag Team Championship (1 time) – with Edward G. Xtasy
- Destiny World Wrestling
  - DWW Championship (1 time)
- Florida Championship Wrestling
  - FCW Jack Brisco 15 Championship (1 time)
  - FCW Florida Tag Team Championship (1 time) – with Titus O'Neil
- International Wrestling Association
  - IWA Hardcore Championship (1 time)
- National Wrestling Alliance
  - NWA National Championship (1 time)
  - NWA World Tag Team Championship (1 time) – with J. R. Kratos
- Ohio Valley Wrestling
  - OVW Heavyweight Championship (2 times)
  - OVW Southern Tag Team Championship (1 time) – with Nova
  - OVW Television Championship (1 time)
  - Third OVW Triple Crown Champion
- Pro Wrestling Illustrated
  - Ranked No. 50 of the top 500 singles wrestlers in the PWI 500 in 2013
- Total Nonstop Action Wrestling
  - Impact Grand Championship (1 time)
  - Impact Grand Championship Tournament (2016)
- World Wrestling Council
  - WWC Puerto Rico Heavyweight Championship (1 time)
  - WWC World Tag Team Championship (4 times) – with Shawn Spears (1), Chicano (1), King Tonga Jr. (1) and Abbad (1)
- WWE
  - WWE Tag Team Championship (1 time) – with The Miz
  - Money in the Bank (2013 – World Heavyweight Championship contract)
  - WWE Tag Team Championship #1 Contender Tournament (2012) – with Cody Rhodes
  - Slammy Award (2 times)
    - LOL Moment of the Year (2014) – Being The Miz's stunt double
    - Double-Cross of the Year (2015) – Eliminates The Miz from the Andre the Giant Memorial battle royal at WrestleMania 31
