= Primo Colón =

Puerto Rican wrestler (born 1982)

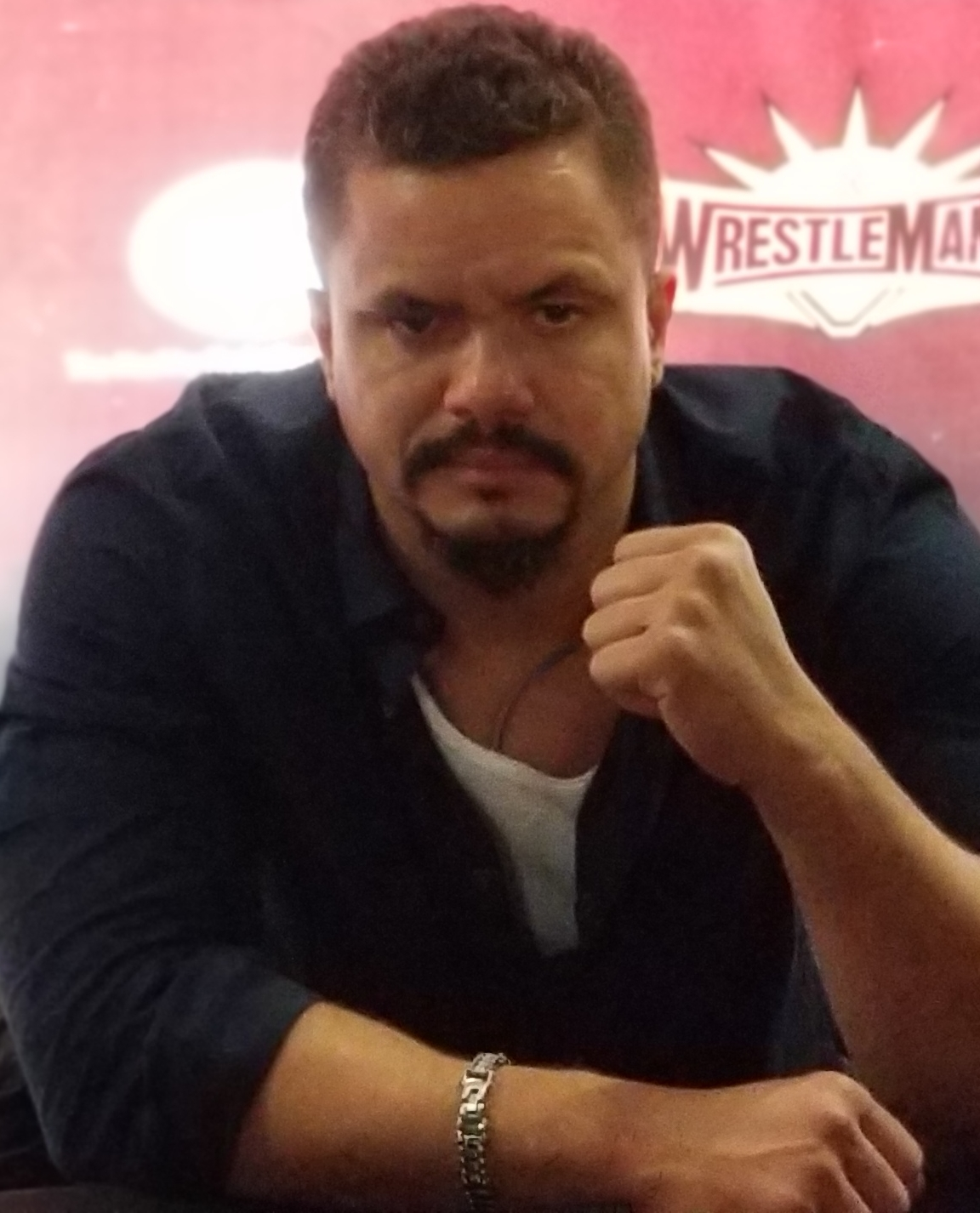
- Colón in 2019

Personal information
- Born: Edwin Carlos Colón Coates; December 21, 1982 (age 43) San Juan, Puerto Rico
- Parent: Carlos Colón (father)
- Relatives: Carlito (brother); Epico Colón (cousin)

Professional wrestling career
- Ring name(s): Diego; Eddie Colón; Primo; Primo Colón
- Billed height: 5 ft 10 in (1.78 m)
- Billed weight: 210 lb (95 kg)
- Billed from: San Juan, Puerto Rico; Plaza de toros
- Trained by: Carlos Colón Sr.
- Debut: 1999

Edwin Carlos Colón Coates (born December 21, 1982) is a Puerto Rican professional wrestler. He is signed to World Wrestling Council (WWC), where he performs as Eddie Colón. He is best known for his tenure in WWE, where he performed under the ring name Primo Colón.

He is the son of Carlos Colón and the younger brother of Carlos (Carly) Colón Jr. (who performs in WWE under the ring name Carlito) and Stacy Colón. He began wrestling in the World Wrestling Council (WWC), where he won the WWC Universal Heavyweight Championship five times, as well as numerous secondary and tertiary titles. In 2007, Colón signed a developmental contract with WWE, being assigned to Florida Championship Wrestling (FCW). He was teamed with Eric Pérez, forming a tag team known as The Puerto Rican Nightmares, and they became the first wrestlers to hold the FCW Florida Tag Team Championship. Upon being promoted to the main roster in 2008, he was teamed with Carlito. Subsequently, The Colóns became the first team to hold the WWE Tag Team Championship and World Tag Team Championship at the same time, making them the first Unified WWE Tag Team Champions. After Carlito left the promotion, he began teaming with his cousin Orlando Colón (best known in WWE as Epico), with whom he held the WWE Tag Team Championship once. After two years of inactivity, Colón left WWE in 2020.

== Professional wrestling career ==
=== World Wrestling Council (1999–2016) ===
Colón debuted in 1999, wrestling in the cruiserweight division. He won the first title on February 10, 2001, when he defeated Damian Steele for the WWC World Junior Heavyweight Championship. His feud with Steele continued for a month, during which he dropped and recovered the title on March 10, 2001. He feuded over the title for six months, losing and winning it once. By autumn, Colón was involved in a storyline involving Justin McCully, continuing a similar pattern. In early 2002, Colón was involved in a storyline with Rey Mysterio Jr, who defeated Colón for the title on January 6, 2002. Mysterio held the title for two months before dropping it back on April 6, 2002, which marked Colón's final Junior Championship reign. Following a long feud with Rico Casanova and then Kid Kash, the belt was held up and Colón ascended to the Heavyweight division.

Shortly after Carly Colón signed with WWE, a tournament was organized to determine the new champion. Colón was considered an early favorite and reached the final, but lost. Colón then entered a feud with El Diamante over the WWC Puerto Rico Heavyweight Championship. In late 2004, Colón was involved in a battle royal for the first contender's position. One week later on November 6, 2004, Colón defeated El Bronco and won the Universal Heavyweight Championship for the first time in his career. He then entered a feud with El Diamante, eventually dropping the title to him. On July 31, 2005, he formed a tag team with his father as part of the Funking Conservatory‘s television show, !Bang!, competing against Dory Funk, Jr. and Johnny Magnum. The team was victorious, winning the promotion’s Television Tag Team Championship. On March 5, 2006, he participated in WCW Saturday Night tribute show World Wrestling Legends: 6:05 - The Reunion, he was defeated by Vampiro. On July 13, 2007 at World Wrestling Council’s anniversary event, ‘’Aniversario 2007’', Colón wrestled Christian Cage in a match that resulted in a double-countout.

After signing with WWE, Primo would make occasional appearances with WWC while working for WWE until 2016.

=== World Wrestling Entertainment/WWE (2007–2020) ===
==== Florida Championship Wrestling (2007–2008) ====
On May 7, 2007, Colón had a closed door workout match before the ‘’Raw‘’ television tapings where he was evaluated by the personnel responsible for talent management. The following day, Colón participated in a dark match before that night’s ‘’SmackDown‘’ television tapings, where he defeated Shannon Moore.

On January 26, 2008, Colón made his Florida Championship Wrestling debut, defeating Shawn Osbourne. On February 23, Colón and Eric Pérez, collectively known as The Puerto Rican Nightmares, defeated Heath Miller and Steve Lewington in a tournament final to become the inaugural FCW Florida Tag Team Champions. The team lost the title to Brad Allen and Nic Nemeth on March 23, 2008, before winning them back via disqualification on April 15, 2008. They lost the title to Drew McIntyre and Stu Sanders on May 6, 2008. On July 17, Colón and Pérez reclaimed the title by defeating McIntyre and Sanders. On August 16, Colón and Perez lost the title to Nic Nemeth and Gavin Spears.

==== Teaming with Carlito (2008–2010) ====
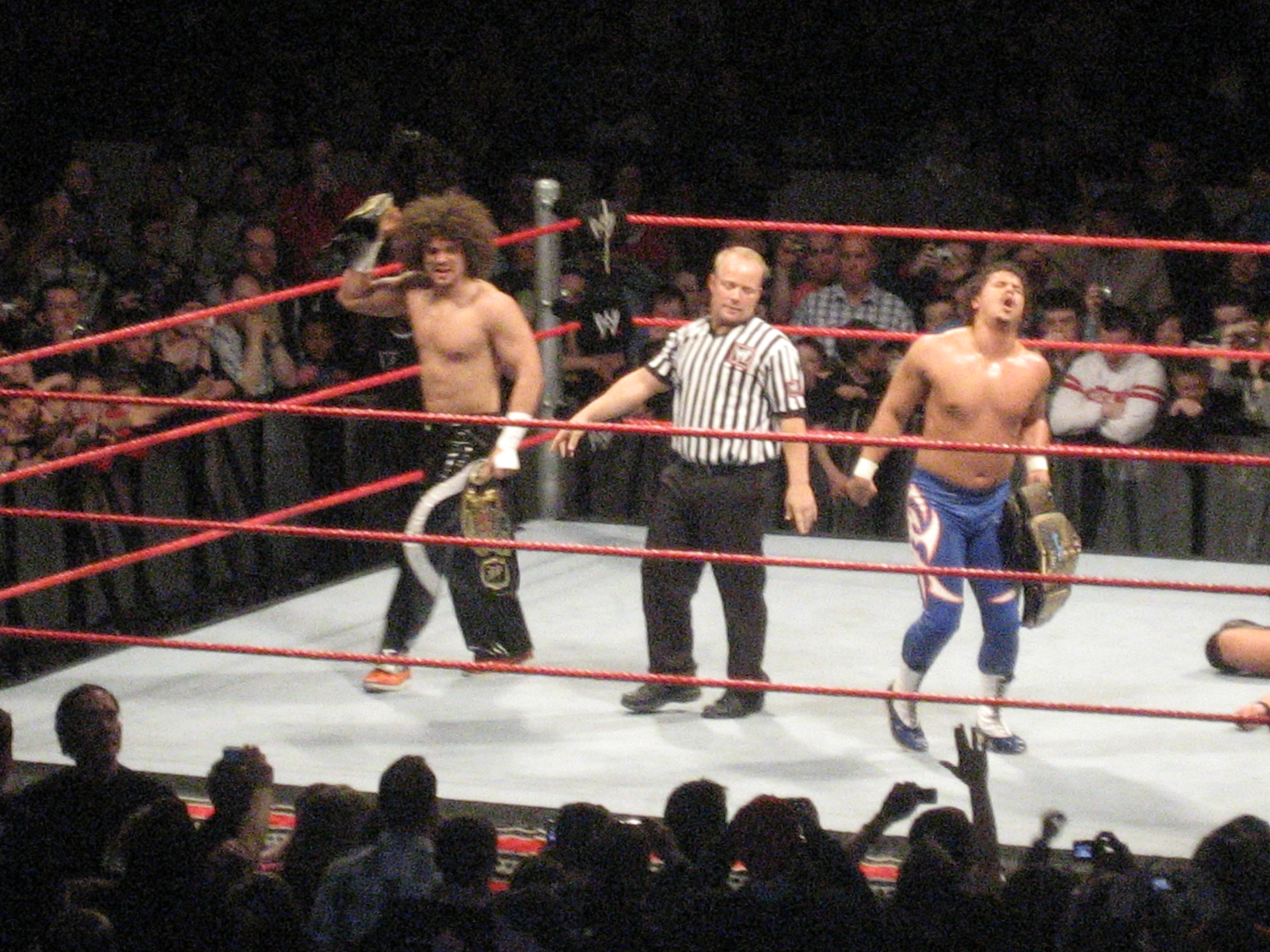
The Colóns as Unified WWE Tag Team Champions

On the August 18, 2008 episode of Raw, Colón made his main roster debut under the ring name Primo Colón and was involved in a backstage segment with Raw General Manager, Mike Adamle, talking about his dislike for his brother Carlito's attitude and how he was nothing like him. His in-ring wrestling debut on the Raw brand took place on August 25, when he defeated Charlie Haas, dressed as Carlito and named Charlito, in singles competition.

After only one match on Raw, Primo Colón, now billed as simply Primo, was moved to the SmackDown brand where his animosity for his brother was dropped and they formed a tag team. On the September 12 episode of SmackDown, he teamed with his brother Carlito to defeat WWE Tag Team Champions Curt Hawkins and Zack Ryder in a non-title match. Two weeks later, both teams competed in a title rematch, with The Colóns winning to become WWE Tag Team Champions. In January 2009, The Colóns entered a feud with World Tag Team Champions John Morrison and The Miz. On the WrestleMania 25 pre-show, The Colóns defeated John Morrison and The Miz in a tag team unification match, becoming the first team to hold the newly dubbed "Unified WWE Tag Team Championship". On the April 6 episode of Raw, they successfully defended their titles for the first time in a rematch.

On April 15, both Primo and Carlito were drafted back to the Raw brand as part of the 2009 Supplemental draft. At The Bash, they lost the Unified WWE Tag Team Championship to the team of Edge and Chris Jericho, who were added to a standard tag team match between The Colóns and The Legacy (Cody Rhodes and Ted DiBiase) moments before the match started. The Colóns invoked their rematch clause the next night on ‘’Raw’', but were unsuccessful. On the July 6 episode of Raw, they lost again to Edge and Jericho, and afterwards Carlito attacked Primo, leading to a feud between the two which ended after Carlito defeated Primo on the August 3 episode of Raw. At Night of Champions, Primo competed in a Six-pack challenge for the United States Championship, which Kofi Kingston won to retain his title. On the May 6, 2010 episode of Superstars, Carlito stopped their match against each other and asked him to work as a team again, thus turning Primo into a heel in the process. On the May 10 episode of Raw, Primo and Carlito brutally attacked R-Truth for Ted DiBiase, who paid them straight after the attack. The team was split up again after Carlito was released from his contract on May 21.

In September, Primo was one of the WWE Pros for the third season of NXT, with AJ as his NXT rookie. On the November 23 episode of NXT, A.J. was eliminated from the competition. Primo then mainly featured on Superstars.

==== Teaming with Epico (2011–2020) ====
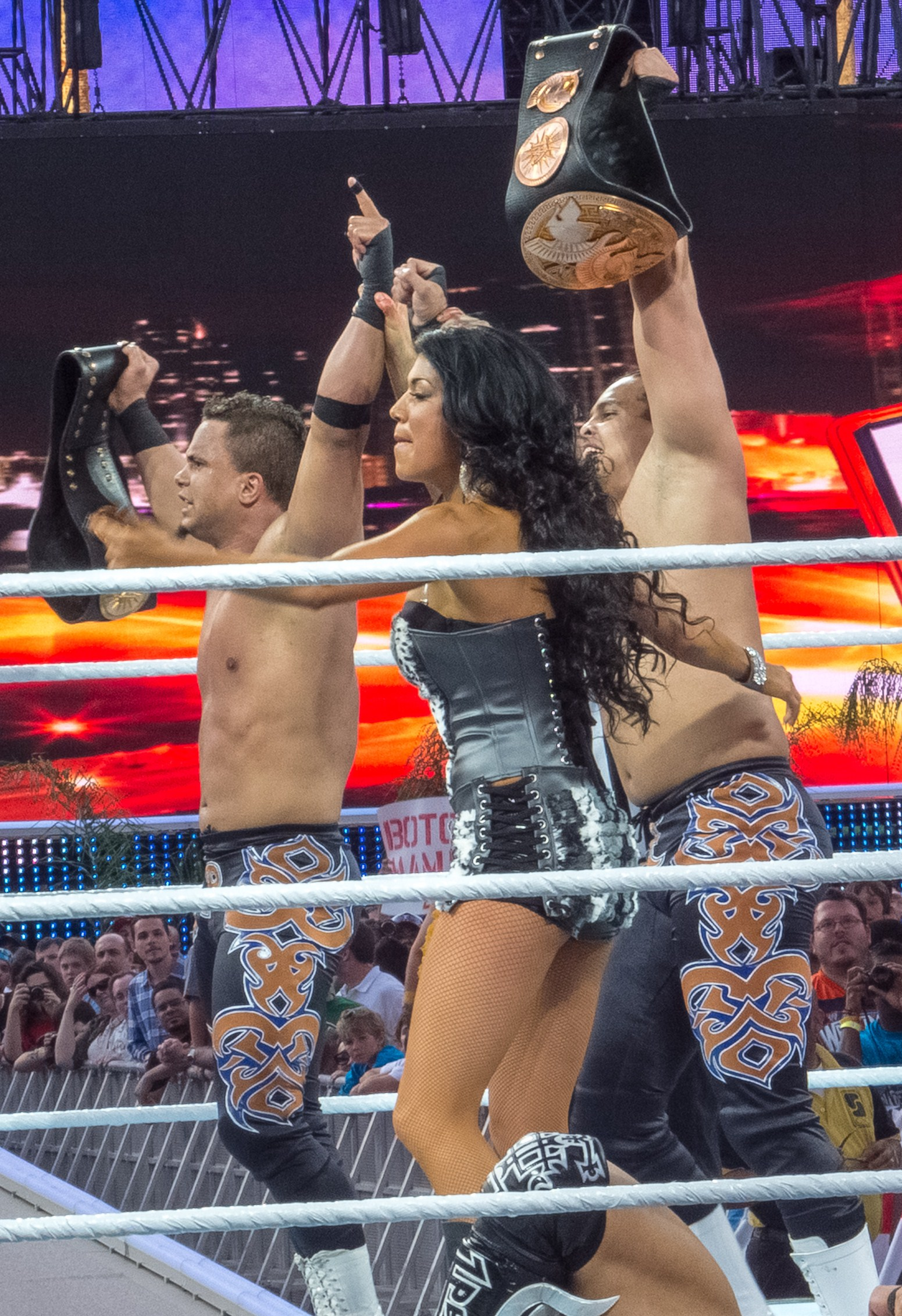
Primo (left) and Epico with Rosa Mendes at WrestleMania XXVIII

On the November 11, 2011 episode of SmackDown, Primo accompanied Hunico and his real-life cousin Epico to the ring for their tag team match against The Usos (Jimmy and Jey Uso). Primo then began teaming with Epico, with Rosa Mendes as their manager, where they defeated The Usos on the November 17 episode of Superstars. They began a feud with WWE Tag Team Champions Air Boom (Evan Bourne and Kofi Kingston), trading victories. At TLC: Tables, Ladders & Chairs, Primo and Epico failed to capture the WWE Tag Team Championships from Air Boom. The feud continued in singles and non-title matches, with both teams trading wins. At a live event on January 15, 2012, Primo and Epico defeated Air Boom to win the WWE Tag Team Championship. The following night on Raw SuperShow, Primo and Epico successfully defended their titles against Air Boom in a rematch. On the February 27 episode of Raw SuperShow, Primo and Epico successfully defended their titles in a Triple Threat tag team match against the teams of Kofi Kingston and R-Truth, and Dolph Ziggler and Jack Swagger. In the pre-show of WrestleMania XXVIII, Primo and Epico successfully defended the title against The Usos, and Justin Gabriel and Tyson Kidd in a triple threat tag team match. On the April 30 episode of Raw SuperShow, Primo and Epico lost the tag team titles to Kofi Kingston and R-Truth.

In May, Primo and Epico joined A.W.'s talent agency. At No Way Out, A.W. turned on them during their number one contender Fatal Four-Way tag team match, aligned with The Prime Time Players (Darren Young and Titus O'Neil). The following night on Raw SuperShow, Primo and Epico defeated The Prime Time Players by count-out after Young and O'Neil walked out of the match. The feud continued on Superstars, where Epico lost to Young and Primo beat O'Neil in singles matches. At Money in the Bank, Primo and Epico defeated Young and O'Neil. The feud ended in August when A.W. was released from WWE. At Survivor Series, Primo took part in a 10–man elimination tag team match, but was eliminated by Rey Mysterio. Primo and Epico could not find any wins after August 2012, and by the first ‘’SmackDown’' of 2013, Primo was on a 20 match losing streak, and Epico was at 17. On the January 9, 2013 episode of NXT, Primo and Epico broke their losing streaks with a win over Bo Dallas and Michael McGillicutty. However, Dallas and McGillicutty gained revenge by defeating Primo and Epico in the first round of the NXT Tag Team Championship tournament.

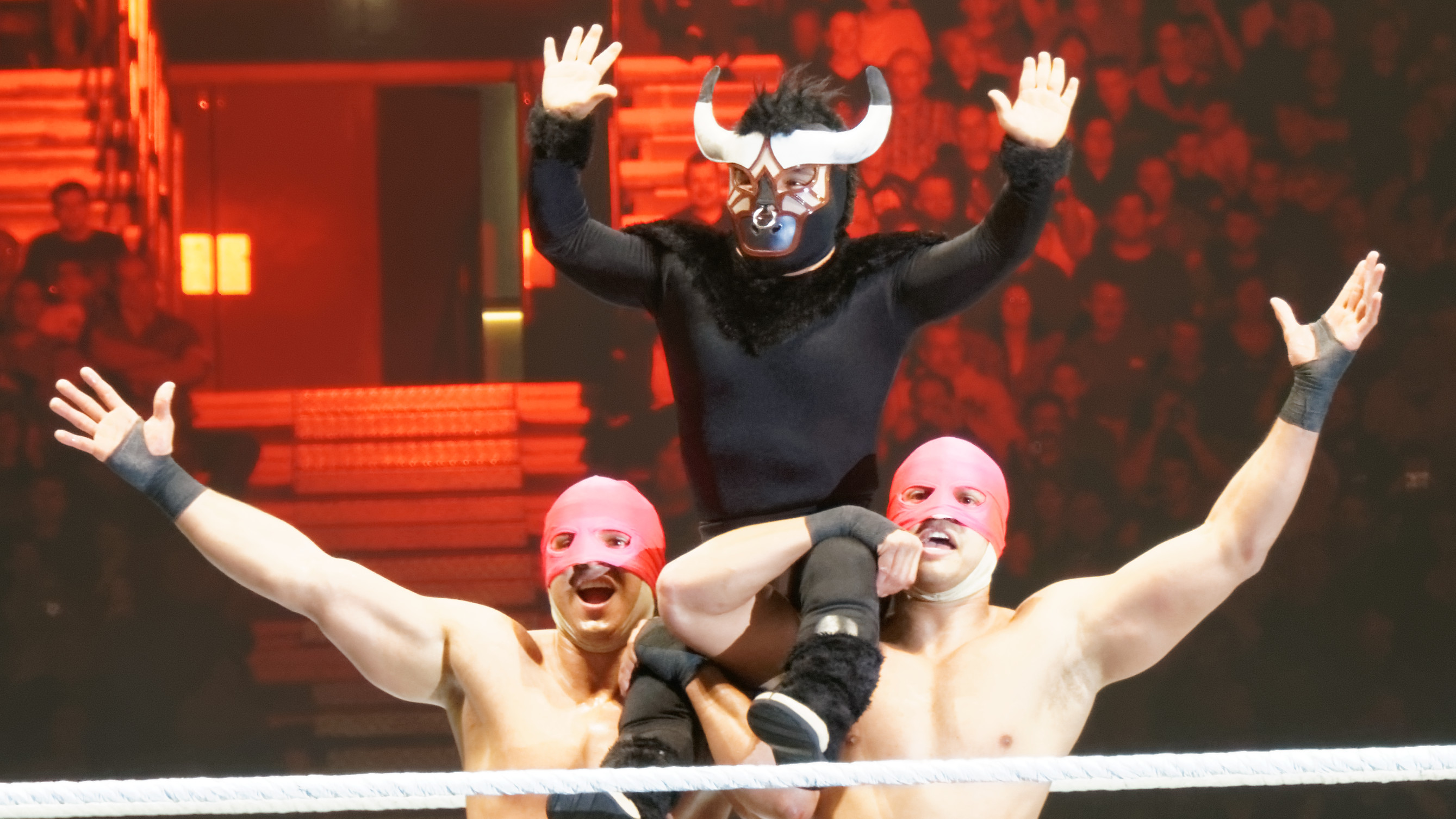
In mid–2013, Primo and Epico changed their gimmick to Los Matadores

On the August 19, 2013 episode of Raw, a vignette was aired introducing the debut of Los Matadores, and on the September 30 episode of Raw, Primo and Epico debuted new characters, as Diego and Fernando of Los Matadores, a face team of two masked Spanish bullfighters with El Torito as mascot as they defeated 3MB (Heath Slater, Drew McIntyre and Jinder Mahal. It was the start of a winning streak that featured nine wins over 3MB, (with El Torito wrestling in some matches), and also over The Real Americans (Antonio Cesaro and Jack Swagger) at Hell in a Cell. Los Matadores' winning streak was snapped on the January 24, 2014 episode of SmackDown, courtesy of RybAxel (Ryback and Curtis Axel). On the WrestleMania XXX pre-show, Los Matadores received a WWE Tag Team Championship shot against The Usos, RybAxel and The Real Americans, in a Fatal Four-Way tag team elimination match, but lost after eliminated by The Real Americans. At Battleground, Diego competed in a battle royal for the vacant Intercontinental Championship, but was eliminated by Ryback. On March 29, 2015, at the WrestleMania 31 pre-show, Los Matadores were in a Fatal 4-way match for the WWE Tag Team Championship, but failed to win the titles. Diego participated in the André the Giant Memorial Battle Royal but was eliminated by Kane. After months of chasing the WWE Tag Team Championship, Los Matadores fell out and seemingly broke up, as they no longer appeared on TV.

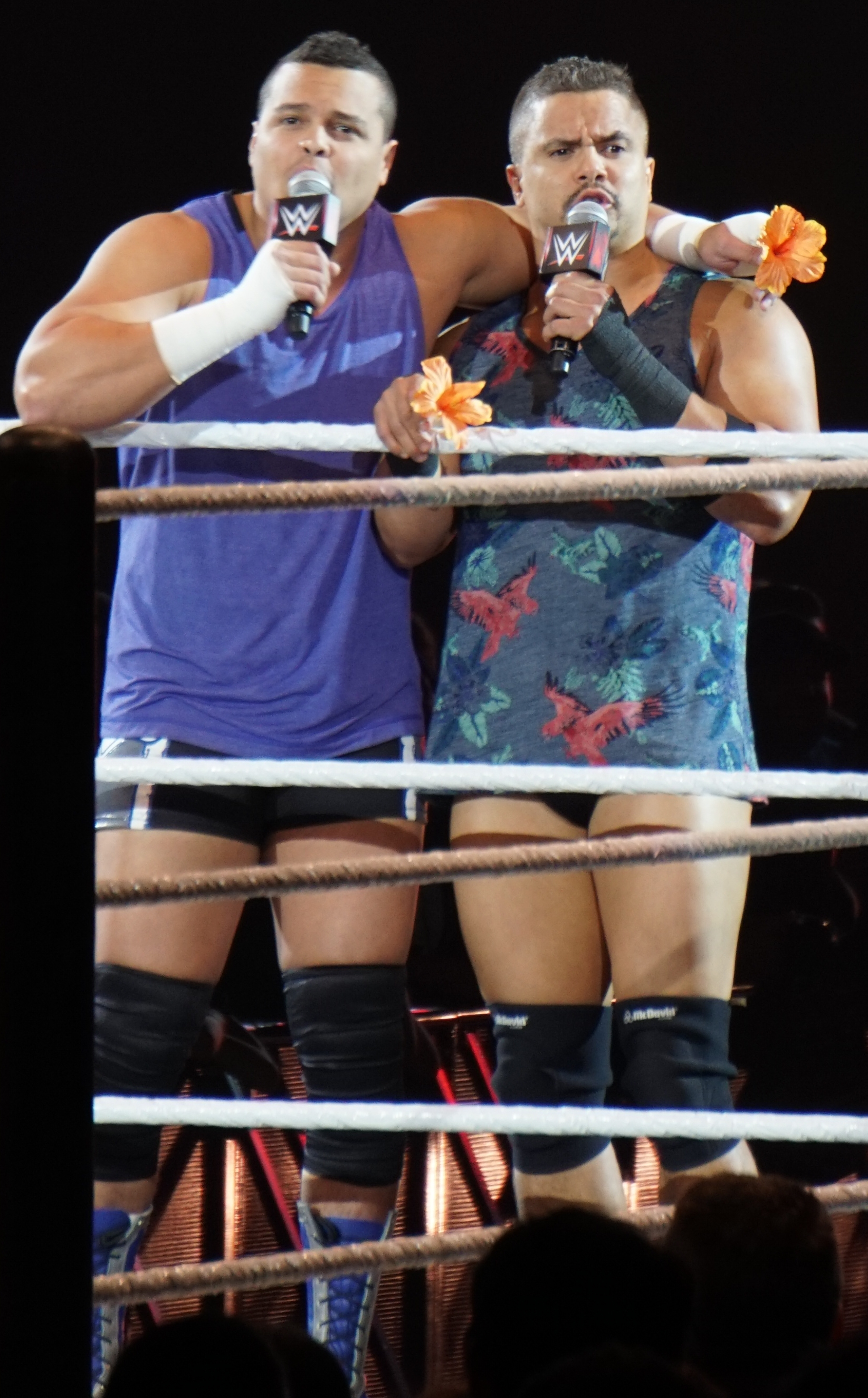
Primo (right) and Epico in September 2016

From April 4 to May 9, 2016, several videos aired on Raw promoted the return of Primo and Epico, who revived their Puerto Rican gimmick under the new name The Shining Stars. On the May 16 episode of Raw, The Shining Stars debuted by defeating a local tag team Scott Jackson and Brian Kennedy in a squash match. They then began showing tendencies of con men, trying to persuade various superstars to purchase timeshares to their Puerto Rican resort. This led to a feud with The Golden Truth (Goldust and R-Truth) On the November 7 episode of Raw, after R-Truth sold his team's Survivor Series spot for a stay at a timeshare to The Shining Stars, both teams competed to qualify for the 10–on–10 Survivor Series Tag Team Elimination match, which Primo and Epico won. At Survivor Series, Team Raw defeated Team SmackDown. At WrestleMania 33, Primo participated in the André the Giant Memorial Battle Royal but was eliminated by Braun Strowman.

On April 11, 2017, they were traded to the SmackDown brand as part of the 2017 Superstar Shake-up when they attacked American Alpha (Chad Gable and Jason Jordan). The following week on SmackDown Live, the team were officially renamed The Colóns, after defeating American Alpha. In June, Colón suffered a knee injury. After a long hiatus, Colón returned on the April 3, 2018 episode of SmackDown Live, teaming with Baron Corbin, Dolph Ziggler and Mojo Rawley in a winning effort against Breezango (Tyler Breeze and Fandango), Tye Dillinger and Zack Ryder. At WrestleMania 34, Colón participated in the André the Giant Memorial Battle Royal, which he failed to win. Following this, the team rarely appeared on TV or at live events, virtually disappearing. On December 10, 2019, Colón was suspended for 30 days, for violating of WWE's Wellness Policy. Primo claimed that he didn't fail the test and was suspended due to missing the test, as he was in Puerto Rico at the time and stated that he plans to appeal the decision. On April 15, 2020, Primo was released from his WWE contract due to the budget cuts stemming from the COVID-19 pandemic, ending his 13-year tenure with the company.

=== Return to WWC (2019–2025) ===
While still part of WWE's roster (yet inactive), The Colóns returned to WWC, working in both administrative roles and as in-ring talent in 2019. By the summer, Epico was harassed by a wrestler sporting his former mantle of La Pesadilla, but this did not prevent him from earning his first reign as Universal Heavyweight Champion. Afterwards, a storyline began where both Primo and Carlito began pursuing the title. In the first intrafamiliar match, Colón failed to capture the title at Septiembre Negro. At Noche de Campeones, all three cousins wrestled each other for the first time in their careers. Epico retained, but Colón turned on the family and rebranded himself Eddie "La Maravilla" Colón, forming a faction known as The Dynasty along Gilbert and Peter John Ramos. The three then began a campaign to dethrone the champion. In the process, Colón was faced with the new allies of his cousin, losing to a returning Apollo (part of the "Dream Team", along Ricky Banderas) when the rest of The Dynasty intervened.

=== Total Nonstop Action Wrestling (2025) ===
In early 2025, Colón debuted in Total Nonstop Action Wrestling (TNA) as Eddie Colón, teaming with his cousin Orlando Colón as The Colóns. They aligned with The System (Eddie Edwards, Brian Myers, and JDC) in February, competing in tag team matches against teams like The Hardys and Joe Hendry & Elijah. At Sacrifice in March 2025, The Colóns participated in the main event, losing to a team led by Joe Hendry. Their TNA run was brief, with Colón departing by mid-2025 to focus on WWC commitments.)

=== Second return to WWC (2025-present) ===
After his stint in TNA, Eddie returned to WWC to resume duties as Director of Operations.

== Other media ==
Colón made his video game debut in WWE SmackDown vs. Raw 2010 and has appeared in WWE SmackDown vs. Raw 2011, WWE '13, WWE 2K18 and WWE 2K19 as Primo and in WWE 2K16 (as DLC) and WWE 2K17 as Diego.

== Movies ==
Colón acted as a role for Diego in a Scooby-Doo animated movie, with his cousin Fernando and El Torito.

== Personal life ==
Colón is the son of retired wrestler Carlos Colón and the third youngest of three siblings, including Carlos Jr. and Stacy Colón, both of whom have performed in the World Wrestling Council. A second sister, Melissa did not enter the wrestling business. Other members of Colón’s family have also been involved in the World Wrestling Council, including his uncle José Colón and cousin Orlando Colón, who have been involved in several angles within the company.

== Championships and accomplishments ==
- Coastal Championship Wrestling
  - CCW Tag Team Championship (1 time) - with Orlando Colón
- Florida Championship Wrestling
  - Florida Tag Team Championship (3 times) – with Eric Pérez
- Funking Conservatory
  - FC Tag Team Championship (1 time) – with Carlos Colón
- Pro Wrestling Illustrated
  - Ranked No. 72 of the best 500 singles wrestlers in the PWI 500 in 2012
  - Ranked No. 147 of the top 500 singles wrestlers in the ‘’PWI 500‘’ in 2019
- World Wrestling Council
  - WWC Universal Heavyweight Championship (5 times)
  - WWC Puerto Rico Heavyweight Championship (5 times)
  - WWC World Junior Heavyweight Championship (6 times)
  - WWC World Tag Team Championship (1 time) – with Carly Colón
- World Wrestling Entertainment / WWE
  - World Tag Team Championship (1 time) – with Carlito
  - WWE Tag Team Championship (2 times) – with Carlito (1) and Epico (1)

== Luchas de Apuestas record ==
Winner (wager)	Loser (wager)	Location	Event	Date	Notes
Eddie Colón (Stacy Colón's hair)	Dominican Boy (mask)	Carolina, Puerto Rico	WWC Aniversario 2003	July 19, 2003	
