= FCW Florida Tag Team Championship =

Professional wrestling tag team championship

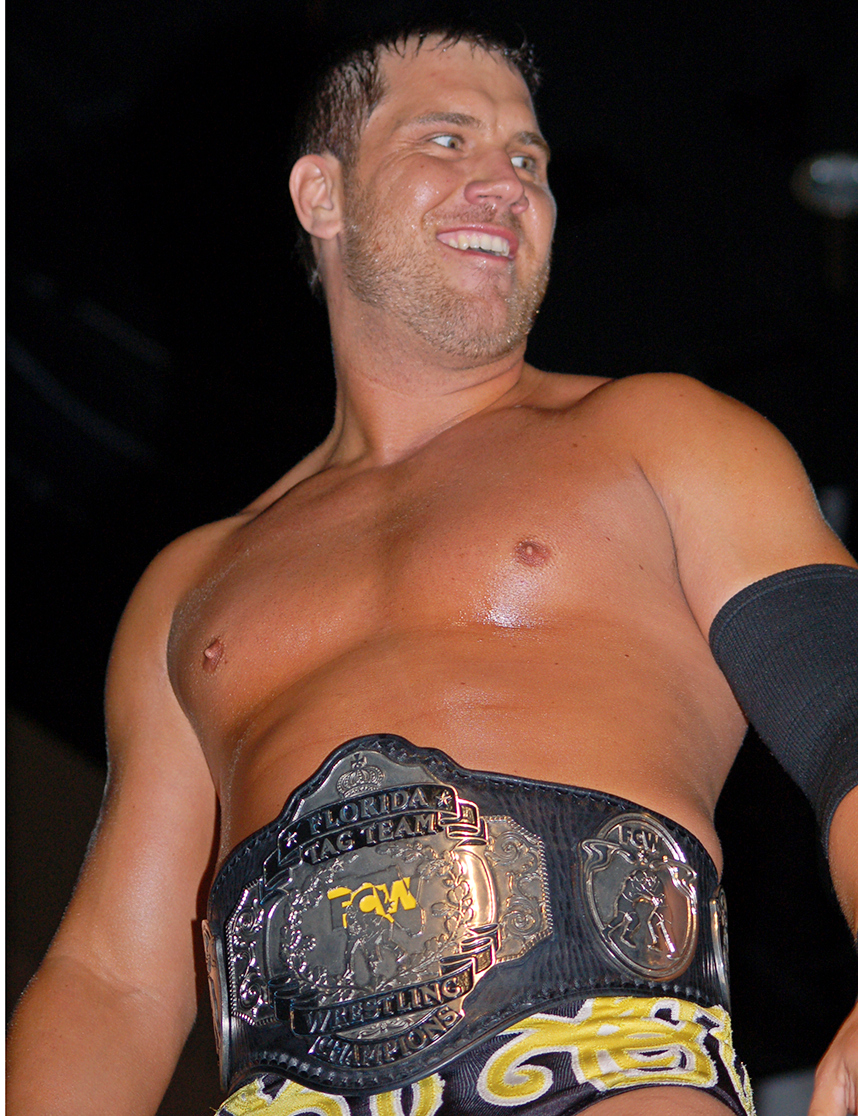
- Joe Hennig as champion in 2010

Details
- Promotion: Florida Championship Wrestling
- Date established: February 23, 2008
- Date retired: August 14, 2012
Statistics
- First champions: The Puerto Rican Nightmares (Eddie Colón and Eric Pérez)
- Final champions: Rick Victor and Brad Maddox
- Most reigns: (as a team); The Puerto Rican Nightmares (Eddie Colón and Eric Pérez) (3 reigns) (as an individual); Joe Hennig/Michael McGillicutty (4 reigns)
- Longest reign: Johnny Curtis and Tyler Reks (140 days)
- Shortest reign: Justin Gabriel and Kris Logan (<1 day)

The FCW Florida Tag Team Championship was a professional wrestling tag team championship owned and promoted by Florida Championship Wrestling, (FCW), a former developmental territory of WWE. It was contested for in their tag team division. The championship was created and debuted on February 23, 2008 at a FCW house show.

The first champions were The Puerto Rican Nightmares (Eddie Colón and Eric Pérez) who won a one night tag team tournament by defeating Steve Lewington and Heath Miller in the finals to become the inaugural champions. In August 2012, the championship was retired when FCW was closed and the NXT brand was created, being replaced by in favor with NXT Tag Team Championship in early 2013 with Rick Victor and Brad Maddox becoming the final champions after defeating CJ Parker and Jason Jordan on July 28, 2012 in Melbourne, Florida, to win the titles.

Overall, there were 26 different championship teams, and 45 individual champions with the tag team of The Puerto Rican Nightmares (Eddie Colón and Eric Pérez) holding the most reigns at three. Joe Hennig/Michael McGillicutty, hold most reigns by a single competitor, with four. Johnny Curtis and Tyler Reks hold the longest reign at 140 days, in addition, Curtis holds the longest combined reign individually at 224 days. Justin Gabriel and Kris Logan have the shortest reign as a team at less than one day, due to them winning and losing the titles during the same FCW television taping event.

== Reigns ==
Key
No.	Overall reign number
Reign	Reign number for the specific champion
Days	Number of days held

No.	Champion	Championship change			Reign statistics		Notes	Ref.
No.	Champion	Date	Event	Location	Reign	Days	Notes	Ref.
1	The Puerto Rican Nightmares (Eddie Colón and Eric Pérez)	February 23, 2008	Live event	Port Richey, FL	1	29	Defeated Steven Lewington and Heath Miller in the finals of a one-night tournament to become the first champions.	
2	Brad Allen and Nic Nemeth	March 23, 2008	Live event	Port Richey, FL	1	23		
3	The Puerto Rican Nightmares (Eddie Colón and Eric Pérez)	April 15, 2008	Live event	Port Richey, FL	2	22	Won the titles by disqualification in a match where the title could change hands in case of a disqualification.	
4	The Empire (Drew McIntyre and Stu Sanders)	May 6, 2008	Live event	Port Richey, FL	1	66		
5	Gabe Tuft and Joe Hennig	July 12, 2008	Live event	Port Richey, FL	1	3		
6	The Empire (Drew McIntyre and Stu Sanders)	July 15, 2008	Live event	Port Richey, FL	2	2		
7	The Puerto Rican Nightmares (Eddie Colón and Eric Pérez)	July 17, 2008	Live event	Tampa, FL	3	30		
8	Gavin Spears and Nic Nemeth	August 16, 2008	Live event	New Port Richey, FL	1 (1, 2)	26	This was a three–way match, also involving Scotty Goldman and Kafu.	
9	Heath Miller/Sebastian Slater (Note: Heath Miller's ring name was changed to Sebastian Slater during this title reign.) and Joe Hennig	September 11, 2008	Live event	Tampa, FL	1 (1, 2)	49		
10	Next Generation Hart Foundation (DH Smith and TJ Wilson)	October 30, 2008	Live event	Tampa, FL	1	42		
11	Johnny Curtis and Tyler Reks	December 11, 2008	FCW	Tampa, FL	1 (1, 2)	140		
12	The Dude Busters (Caylen Croft and Trent Barreta)	April 30, 2009	FCW	Tampa, FL	1	84		
13	Justin Gabriel and Kris Logan	July 23, 2009	FCW	Tampa, FL	1	<1		
14	The Rotundos (Bo Rotundo and Duke Rotundo)	July 23, 2009	FCW	Tampa, FL	1	119		
15	The Dude Busters (Caylen Croft, Trent Barreta and Curt Hawkins)	November 19, 2009	FCW	Tampa, FL	1 (2, 2, 1)	56	Hawkins and Croft won the titles. Defended by any two members under the Freebird Rule.	
16	The Fortunate Sons (Joe Hennig and Brett DiBiase)	January 14, 2010	FCW	Tampa, FL	1 (3, 1)	58	Defeated Caylen Croft and Trent Barreta.	
17	The Usos (Jimmy Uso and Jules/Jey Uso) (Note: Jules Uso's ring name was changed to Jey Uso during this title reign.)	March 13, 2010	Live event	Crystal River, FL	1	82		
18	Los Aviadores (Epico and Hunico)	June 3, 2010	Live event	Tampa, FL	1	42		
19	Kaval and Michael McGillicutty	July 15, 2010	Live event	Tampa, FL	1 (1, 4)	1	This was a legitimate unplanned finish, as in reality, Los Aviadores were supposed to retain the title.	
20	Los Aviadores (Epico and Hunico)	July 16, 2010	Live event	Sebring, FL	2	28		
21	Derrick Bateman and Johnny Curtis	August 12, 2010	FCW	Tampa, FL	1 (1, 2)	84	This was a three–way match, also involving Brodus Clay and Donny Marlow.	
22	Wes Brisco and Xavier Woods	November 4, 2010	FCW	Tampa, FL	1	27		
—	Vacated	December 1, 2010	Live event	Tampa, FL	—	—	Wes Brisco and Xavier Woods were stripped of the titles after Brisco was sidelined with an injury.	
23	Damien Sandow and Titus O'Neil	December 3, 2010	Live event	Plant City, FL	1	112	Defeated Mason Ryan and Xavier Woods to win the vacant titles.	
24	Richie Steamboat and Seth Rollins	March 25, 2011	Live event	Miami, FL	1	48		
25	Big E Langston and Calvin Raines	May 12, 2011	FCW	Tampa, FL	1	70		
26	CJ Parker and Donnie Marlow	July 21, 2011	FCW	Tampa, FL	1	105		
27	Brad Maddox and Briley Pierce	November 3, 2011	FCW	Tampa, FL	1	91		
—	Vacated	February 2, 2012	FCW	Tampa, FL	—	—	Titles vacated due to Pierce's leg injury.	
28	The Rotundos (Bo Rotundo and Husky Harris)	February 2, 2012	FCW	Tampa, FL	2	42	Defeated Brad Maddox and Eli Cottonwood to win the vacant titles.	
29	Corey Graves and Jake Carter	March 15, 2012	FCW	Tampa, FL	1	93		
30	Leakee and Mike Dalton	June 15, 2012	Live event	Palatka, FL	1	28		
31	CJ Parker and Jason Jordan	July 13, 2012	Live event	Punta Gorda, FL	1 (2, 1)	15		
32	Brad Maddox and Rick Victor	July 28, 2012	Live event	Melbourne, FL	1 (2, 1)	17		
—	Deactivated	August 14, 2012	—	Tampa, FL	—	—	Titles retired when FCW closed down.	

== Combined reigns ==
By team

Rank	Team	No. of reigns	Combined days
1	The Rotundos (Bo Rotundo and Duke Rotundo/Husky Harris)	2	161
2	Johnny Curtis and Tyler Reks	1	140
3	Damien Sandow and Titus O'Neil	1	112
4	CJ Parker and Donnie Marlow	1	105
5	Corey Graves and Jake Carter	1	93
6	Brad Maddox and Briley Pierce	1	91
7	The Dude Busters (Caylen Croft and Trent Barreta)	1	84
7	Derrick Bateman and Johnny Curtis	1	84
9	The Usos (Jimmy Uso and Jules/Jey Uso)	1	82
10	The Puerto Rican Nightmares (Eddie Colón and Eric Pérez)	3	80
11	The Empire (Drew McIntyre and Stu Sanders)	2	74
12	Los Aviadores (Epico and Hunico)	2	70
12	Big E Langston and Calvin Raines	1	70
14	The Fortunate Sons (Joe Hennig and Brett DiBiase)	1	58
15	The Dude Busters (Caylen Croft, Trent Barreta and Curt Hawkins)	1	56
16	Heath Miller/Sebastian Slater and Joe Hennig	1	49
17	Richie Steamboat and Seth Rollins	1	48
18	Next Generation Hart Foundation (DH Smith and TJ Wilson)	1	42
19	Leakee and Mike Dalton	1	28
20	Wes Brisco and Xavier Woods	1	27
21	Gavin Spears and Nic Nemeth	1	26
22	Brad Allen and Nic Nemeth	1	23
23	Brad Maddox and Rick Victor	1	17
24	CJ Parker and Jason Jordan	1	15
25	Gabe Tuft and Joe Hennig	1	3
26	Kaval and Michael McGillicutty	1	1
27	Justin Gabriel and Kris Logan	1	<1

By wrestler

Rank	Wrestler	No. of reigns	Combined days
1	Johnny Curtis	2	224
2	Bo Rotundo	2	161
2	Duke Rotundo/Husky Harris	2	161
3	Gabe Tuft/Tyler Reks	2	143
4	Caylen Croft	2	140
4	Trent Barreta	2	140
6	CJ Parker	2	120
7	Damien Sandow	1	112
7	Titus O'Neil	1	112
9	Joe Hennig/Michael McGillicutty	4	111
10	Brad Maddox	2	108
11	Donnie Marlow	1	105
12	Corey Graves	1	93
12	Jake Carter	1	93
13	Briley Pierce	1	91
14	Derrick Bateman	1	84
15	Jimmy Uso	1	82
15	Jules/Jey Uso	1	82
17	Eddie Colón	3	80
17	Eric Pérez	3	80
19	Drew McIntyre	2	74
19	Stu Sanders	2	74
21	Epico	2	70
21	Hunico	2	70
21	Big E Langston	1	70
21	Calvin Raines	1	70
25	Brett DiBiase	1	58
26	Curt Hawkins	1	56
27	Heath Miller/Sebastian Slater	1	49
27	Nic Nemeth	2	49
29	Richie Steamboat	1	48
29	Seth Rollins	1	48
31	DH Smith	1	42
31	TJ Wilson	1	42
33	Leakee	1	28
33	Mike Dalton	1	28
35	Wes Brisco	1	27
35	Xavier Woods	1	27
37	Gavin Spears	1	26
38	Brad Allen	1	23
39	Rick Victor	1	17
40	Jason Jordan	1	15
41	Kaval	1	1
42	Justin Gabriel	1	<1
42	Kris Logan	1	<1
