= Sarah Bäckman =

Swedish wrestler and arm wrestler

- Born: Sarah Bäckman; 8 December 1991 (age 34); Stockholm, Sweden
- Other name: Spirit
- Occupations: Real estate broker; Arm wrestler; professional wrestler; Gladiator
- Spouses: Bo Dallas (m. 2014; div. 2019) Mikey Oliva (m. 2020; div. 2024)
- Professional wrestling career
- Ring name: Shara
- Billed height: 5 ft 8 in (173 cm)
- Billed weight: 165 lb (75 kg)
- Trained by: NXT

Sarah Bäckman (born 8 December 1991) is a bodybuilder and Swedish real estate broker and former professional wrestler and arm wrestler. She is a former eight-time World Arm Wrestling Champion. Bäckman also competed as "Spirit" on the Swedish version of MGM Television's Gladiators franchise. From 2013 to 2014, Bäckman was signed to WWE, working in their developmental territory NXT.

== Arm wrestling career ==
Bäckman began arm wrestling at age 14. She is one of the most decorated women's arm wrestlers in the world. An eight-time World Arm Wrestling Champion, eight-time European Arm Wrestling Champion and 11-time Swedish Arm Wrestling Champion. She retired from arm wrestling to pursue a wrestling career in May 2013 when she decided to sign with WWE.

Sarah has resumed professional arm wrestling after the release of her contract from WWE in 2014. She has won several championships and titles since and is still current and better than ever.

== Gladiatorerna ==
Bäckman portrayed Gladiator "Spirit" on the Swedish version of Gladiators (or Gladiatorerna as the show, which airs on TV4, is referred to in Sweden). Bäckman replaced “Stinger”, who was portrayed by Cajsa Nilsson. In an article for a Swedish newspaper (Aftonbladet), Bäckman referred to being a Gladiator as "a childhood dream" of hers.

== Professional wrestling career ==
In March 2013, it was reported that Bäckman signed a developmental contract with WWE and would report to their developmental territory NXT. Bäckman's ring name was revealed as Shara on 10 February 2014.

Bäckman requested and was granted her release from her contract on 30 April 2014.

== Personal life ==
Bäckman was born in Stockholm on 8 December 1991.

Bäckman was married to American professional wrestler Taylor Rotunda, better known as Bo Dallas, from 2014 until their divorce in 2019. She married fitness instructor Mikey Oliva in 2019.

As of 2015, Bäckman works as a real estate broker. She is a Christian.
