= Bo Dallas =

American professional wrestler (born 1990)

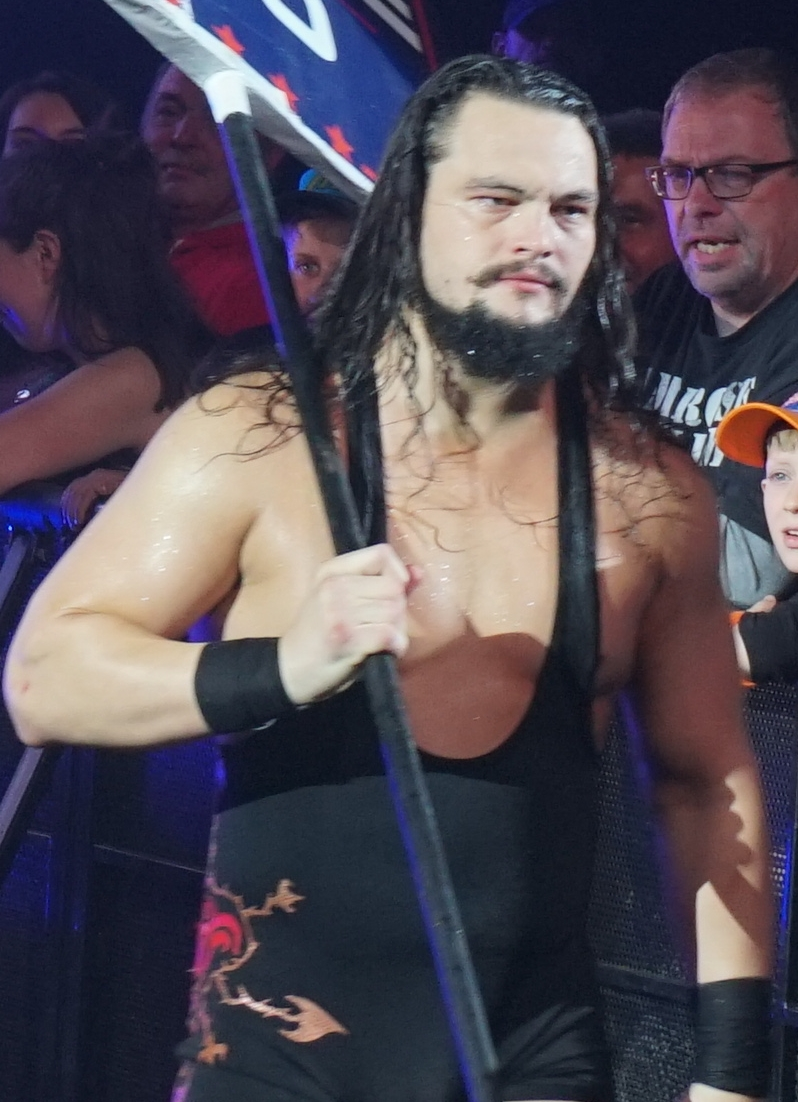
- Dallas in 2017

Personal information
- Born: Taylor Michael Rotunda; May 25, 1990 (age 36) Brooksville, Florida, U.S.
- Spouse: Sarah Bäckman (m. 2014; div. 2019)
- Parent: Mike Rotunda (father)
- Relatives: Bray Wyatt (brother); Blackjack Mulligan (grandfather); Barry Windham (uncle); Kendall Windham (uncle)

Professional wrestling career
- Ring name(s): Bo Dallas; Bo Rotunda; Bo Rotundo; Mr. Florida; Mr. NXT; Tank Mulligan; Tank Rotunda; Tank Rotundo; Taylor Rotunda; Uncle Howdy
- Billed height: 6 ft 1 in (1.85 m)
- Billed weight: 244 lb (111 kg)
- Billed from: Brooksville, Florida
- Trained by: Florida Championship Wrestling
- Debut: November 15, 2008

Taylor Michael Rotunda (born May 25, 1990) is an American professional wrestler. He is best known for his tenures in WWE from 2008 to 2021 and again from 2022 to 2026, where he performed under the ring names Bo Dallas and his alter ego Uncle Howdy and was the leader of The Wyatt Sicks faction.

Rotunda is a third-generation professional wrestler; his grandfather Blackjack Mulligan, his father Mike Rotunda, his uncles Barry and Kendall Windham, and his brother Bray Wyatt were all professional wrestlers.

While in WWE's then-developmental territory Florida Championship Wrestling (FCW), he became a three-time FCW Florida Heavyweight Champion as well as a two-time FCW Florida Tag Team Champion with his brother. FCW was rebranded as NXT in 2012 where Rotunda, repackaged as Bo Dallas, became a one-time and youngest NXT Champion. He was promoted to WWE's main roster in 2014, where he was mostly used as a jobber, and won the WWE Raw Tag Team Championship (with Curtis Axel as part of The B-Team) and the WWE 24/7 Championship once each. He was released from WWE in 2021 but returned in 2022, portraying a character named Uncle Howdy, an accomplice of his brother's. After his brother became ill in 2023, both men were removed from television. His brother Windham died unexpectedly that August, leaving Rotunda off television before he returned with his new faction in June 2024, portraying both Bo Dallas and Uncle Howdy.

== Early life ==
Rotunda attended Hernando High School, and graduated in 2008. During his final two years of high school, he qualified for the state wrestling championships. He also played football as a defensive tackle. Originally, he was offered a football scholarship at Webber International University in Babson Park, Florida, but when the offer fell through, he decided to become a wrestler instead. Rotunda always had a naturally large build and bulky physique, he was already 5'11 and 220 lbs at the age of 15 which is why he chose to compete in sports like football and wrestling which include a lot of physical strength and power.

== Professional wrestling career ==
=== World Wrestling Entertainment / WWE (2008–2021, 2022–2026) ===
==== Florida Championship Wrestling (2008–2012) ====
In 2008, Rotunda signed a developmental contract with World Wrestling Entertainment (WWE) and was assigned to Florida Championship Wrestling (FCW), where he debuted on November 15, 2008, by defeating Kaleb O'Neal. On December 16, Rotunda, wrestling under his real name, teamed with Kris Logan to defeat Ryback and Jon Cutler in a tag team match. Throughout early 2009, Rotunda continued wrestling in tag team matches, and changed his name to Tank Rotunda in February. In June, he began wrestling as Bo Rotunda and later Bo Rotundo, and the following month he began teaming with his brother, Duke Rotundo. At the FCW television tapings on June 23, The Rotundo Brothers defeated The Dude Busters (Caylen Croft and Trent Barreta) to become the number one contenders to the FCW Florida Tag Team Championship. That same night, they defeated Justin Angel and Kris Logan for the FCW Florida Tag Team Championship. They went on to successfully defend the championship against Dylan Klein and Vance Archer and the team of Curt Hawkins and Heath Slater. At the FCW television tapings on November 19, the Rotundos lost the championship to The Dude Busters (Hawkins and Croft). In early 2010, the Rotundos began feuding with The Usos (Jimmy and Jey), and their manager, Sarona Snuka. In April, they moved into a feud with Jackson Andrews and Curt Hawkins, which began when Rotunda faced Andrews in a singles match and won by disqualification when Hawkins interfered.

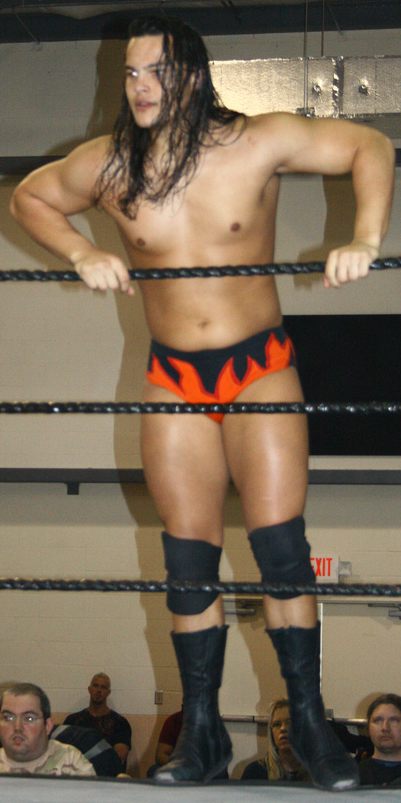
Rotundo during a match in March 2010 at an FCW show

Rotunda was then absent from FCW due to injury, making his return in June 2010. He moved into singles competition, defeating wrestlers including Derrick Bateman, Hawkins, Tyler Reks, and Brodus Clay. In August, FCW Florida Heavyweight Champion Mason Ryan issued an open challenge, which Rotundo accepted. He lost the subsequent championship match by submission. On February 3, 2011, Rotundo defeated Ryan to win the FCW Florida Heavyweight Championship for the first time, but lost the championship to Lucky Cannon immediately afterward. He regained the championship from Cannon three months later, on May 19. In July and August, Rotundo appeared in multiple untelevised matches before Raw and SmackDown. On September 1, Rotundo vacated the FCW Florida Heavyweight Championship due to injury. Later that month, it was reported that Rotundo had suffered a lacerated kidney, and was expected to be absent for several months to recuperate.

Rotundo returned at the tapings of the January 29, 2012, episode of FCW television, declaring his intentions to reclaim the FCW Florida Heavyweight Championship. On February 2, Rotundo and his brother, renamed Husky Harris, defeated Brad Maddox and Eli Cottonwood to win the FCW Florida Tag Team Championship for the second time. The brothers held the championship until March 15, when they lost it to Corey Graves and Jake Carter. In May 2012, Rotundo made several appearances at WWE house shows, defeating Drew McIntyre. At an FCW live event on June 16 Rotundo defeated Rick Victor to win the FCW Florida Heavyweight Championship for the third time, right after Victor had just defeated Seth Rollins for the title. He re lost the title to Victor at another FCW live event on July 13, 2012.

==== NXT (2012–2014) ====
In 2012, WWE rebranded FCW as NXT, Rotunda made his NXT television debut in the June 20 episode of NXT, portraying a happy-go-lucky and resilient character under the ring name Bo Dallas, where he defeated Rick Victor. In August, Dallas competed in a tournament for the newly established NXT Championship; he was eliminated by Jinder Mahal in the quarter-finals. On the November 7 episode of NXT, Dallas competed in a number one contenders fatal four-way elimination match against Mahal, Drew McIntyre, and Justin Gabriel; despite eliminating McIntyre and Gabriel, Dallas succumbed to Mahal.

On January 26, 2013, at WWE's Royal Rumble Fanfest, Dallas participated in an eight-man NXT tournament for a place in the Royal Rumble match; he defeated Luke Harper, Conor O'Brian, and Leo Kruger to win the tournament. The next day, Dallas entered the Rumble match at number 16, where he lasted over 20 minutes and eliminated the WWE Intercontinental Champion, Wade Barrett, who returned to the ring and eliminated Dallas. This provoked a brief feud, with Barrett challenging Dallas to a non-title match the next night on Raw, in which Dallas earned an upset victory. On the February 11 episode of Raw, Dallas appeared, attacking Barrett before Barrett's match against Kofi Kingston. Dallas later challenged Barrett for the Intercontinental Championship in a losing effort.

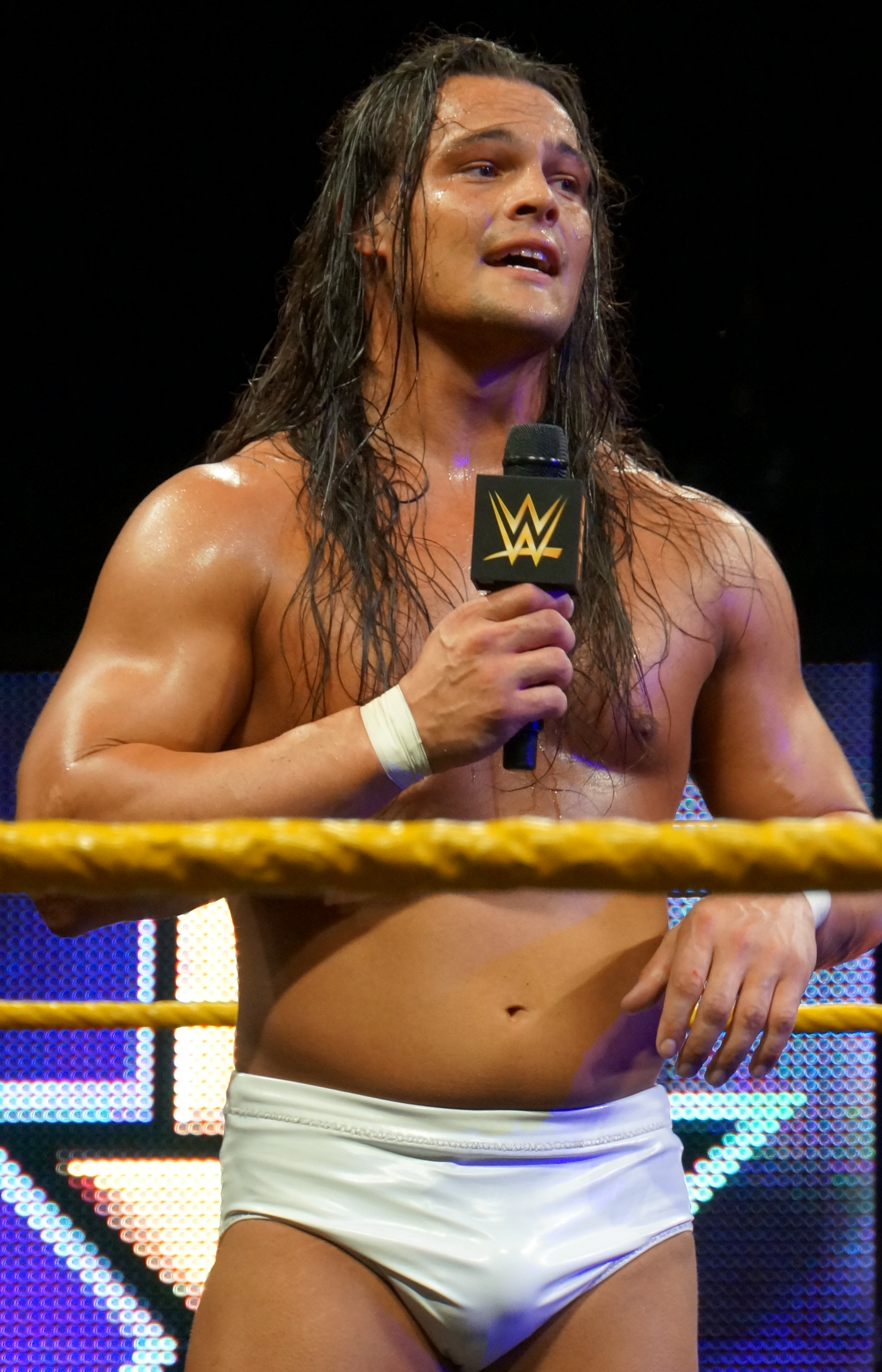
Dallas in April 2014

Simultaneously with his feud with Barrett, Dallas entered the NXT Tag Team Championship tournament alongside Michael McGillicutty. The pair defeated Primo & Epico to advance to the semi-finals, but lost to the Wyatt Family (Luke Harper and Erick Rowan) due to Bray Wyatt's interference. In an NXT Championship number one contender's three-way match against Conor O'Brian and Corey Graves, Dallas was prevented from winning by Wyatt, due to Dallas's earlier refusal to join The Wyatt Family. This resulted in a match between Dallas and Wyatt, which Dallas won. Starting in late April 2013, the NXT audience began to turn against Dallas (despite Dallas not changing his character) and started booing him. NXT Tag Team Champion Adrian Neville chose Dallas to replace his injured partner, Oliver Grey, but on May 8, they lost the title to The Wyatt Family. Soon after, Dallas's character began showing subtle villainous traits of being disingenuous.

On the May 29 episode of NXT, Dallas won a battle royal to become the number one contender to the NXT Championship. On the June 12 NXT (taped on May 23), Dallas defeated Big E Langston to win the title. He successfully defended the championship against Antonio Cesaro and Leo Kruger during mid-2013. By then, the NXT audience's dislike of Dallas had grown to the point of the crowd literally turning their backs on him while cheering all his opponents, regardless of who he faced, thus turning him heel in the process. In September, Dallas held an open challenge to determine his next title contender but banned Sami Zayn from competing, so Zayn masqueraded as the masked El Local and defeated Dallas to earn his title shot. The match occurred on the October 16 episode of NXT, and Dallas retained his title by sending Zayn into an exposed turnbuckle. Dallas then faced Adrian Neville in December and lost by countout to retain his title.

In a rematch at NXT Arrival in February 2014, Dallas lost the title to Neville, and failed to regain it in a rematch on NXT on March 27. The following month, Dallas attempted to "Occupy NXT", but the crowd turned their backs on him, and he was forced into a match against Justin Gabriel, which he won. Beginning to throw tantrums after failing to get his own way, he was put in a match against Big E on May 22. Dallas subsequently lost the match and was forced to leave NXT as a result. In June, he attempted to return to NXT by appearing as the masked character "Mr. NXT" but was exposed by Zayn and forced to leave.

==== "Bolieve" (2014–2016) ====
Dallas in July 2014

On the April 7, 2014 episode of Raw, WWE started airing motivational-style introductory vignettes for Dallas. On the May 23 episode of SmackDown, Dallas made his official main roster debut by defeating Sin Cara. This was the start of a winning streak, which reached a third victory with the defeat of Xavier Woods on the May 30 episode of SmackDown. Dallas made his first pay-per-view appearance at Payback, where he was scheduled to face Kofi Kingston. The match never happened due to interference from Kane. Dallas would defeat Kingston the following night on Raw for his fourth victory. Dallas continued his streak with wins over Santino Marella, Xavier Woods, R-Truth, Fandango and Titus O'Neil. Dallas attacked El Torito after his eleventh victory over Diego on the July 4 episode of SmackDown. He would go on to defeat El Torito for his twelfth victory and then defeated both Diego and Torito in a handicap match as his thirteenth and fourteenth victories. WWE released a video of Bo highlighting the "14-Bo" streak he acknowledged. He continued his streak against The Great Khali, Damien Sandow, and Dolph Ziggler. At Battleground, Dallas participated in the 19-man battle royal for the vacant Intercontinental Championship; he managed to eliminate Sin Cara and Titus O'Neil before being the 16th person eliminated by Dolph Ziggler. Dallas's undefeated streak was ended by R-Truth on the July 28 episode of Raw, prompting a short feud between the two.

In August 2014, Dallas began tormenting Jack Swagger about his loss to Rusev at SummerSlam after Swagger's matches. Dallas began feuding with Mark Henry after defeating him on the September 29 episode of Raw, tormenting him like he did Swagger following Henry's losses to Rusev at Night of Champions. On the October 7 episode of Main Event, Dallas unsuccessfully challenged Dolph Ziggler for the Intercontinental Championship. Dallas then scored three wins over Henry in both singles and tag team matches, before being quickly defeated by Henry in a match on the Hell in a Cell pre-show, ending their feud.

After a four-month absence due to a foot injury, Dallas made his televised return on the WrestleMania 31 pre-show in March 2015, competing in the André the Giant Memorial Battle Royal, where he was eliminated by Hideo Itami. The next night on Raw, Dallas came out and interrupted Sting, telling him to Bo-lieve before receiving a Scorpion Death drop. On the May 18 episode of Raw, Dallas reignited his rivalry with Neville, attacking him before and after his match with King Barrett. At Elimination Chamber, Dallas faced Neville in a losing effort. On the August 24 episode of Raw, Dallas interrupted Brock Lesnar and brought up Lesnar's loss to The Undertaker at SummerSlam, before Lesnar attacked him. On the Survivor Series pre-show, Dallas competed in a five-on-five traditional Survivor Series elimination tag team match where Dallas, The Cosmic Wasteland (Stardust, Konnor and Viktor) and The Miz lost to Goldust, The Dudley Boyz (Bubba Ray Dudley and D-Von Dudley), Neville and Titus O'Neil. At Tribute to the Troops, Bo Dallas, dressed as Uncle Sam, lost to Mark Henry.

==== The Social Outcasts (2016–2017) ====
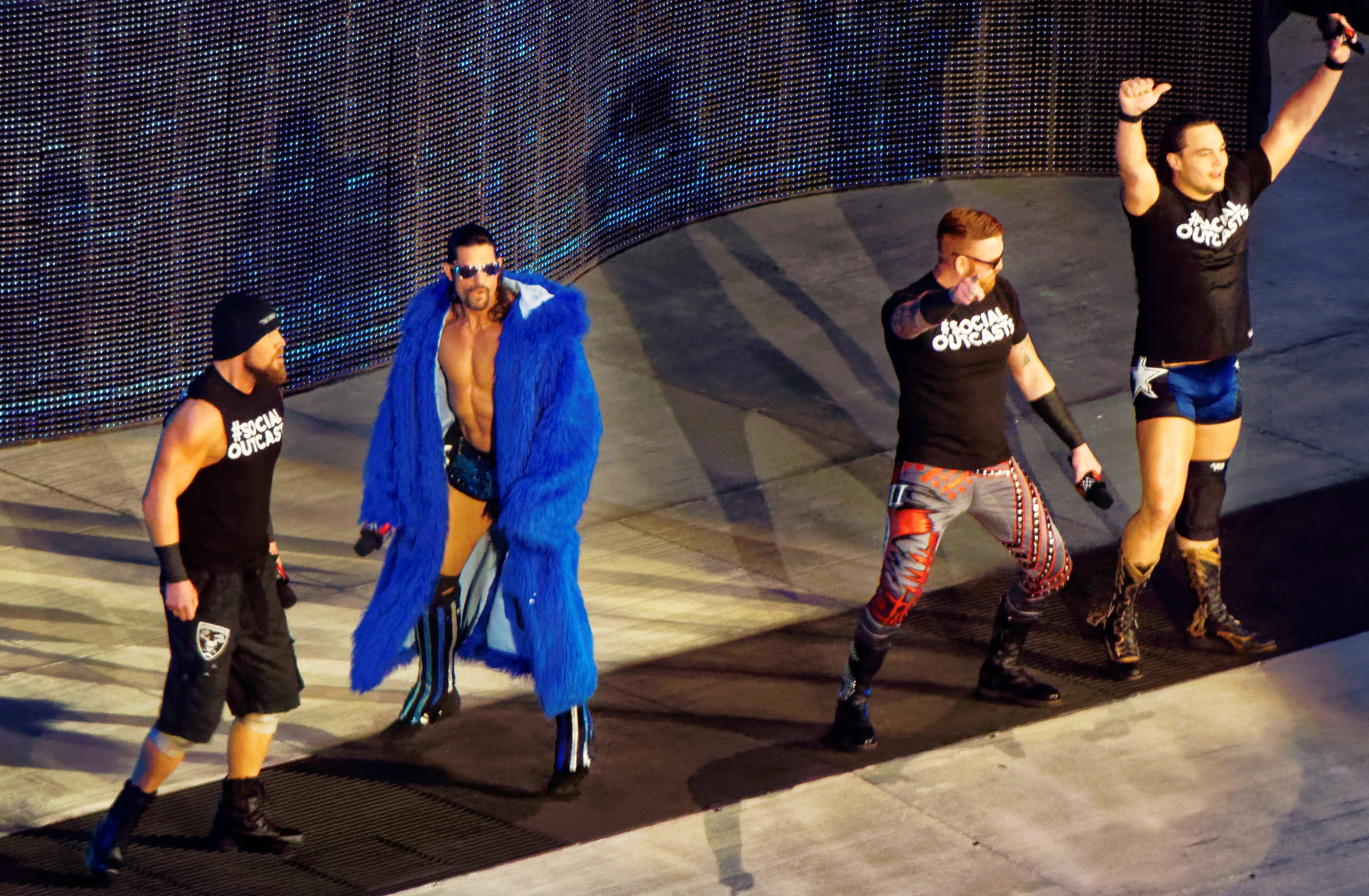
The Social Outcasts in April 2016

On the January 4, 2016 episode of Raw, Dallas, along with Heath Slater, Curtis Axel and Adam Rose, debuted as a new stable and went on to assist Slater in defeating Dolph Ziggler, calling themselves "Social Outcasts". They would remain as a stable for seven months, including all of them competing in the André the Giant Memorial Battle Royal at WrestleMania 32, which was won by Baron Corbin. In May, The Social Outcasts began filming The Marine 5: Battleground, taking them out of action.

On July 19 at the 2016 WWE draft, Dallas was drafted to Raw in the 10th round (50th overall). Dallas then returned on the September 5 episode of Raw, carrying a sign saying "Bo-lieve in Bo", speaking in rhymes and displaying a more vicious style as he defeated a local competitor. Dallas would continue defeating local competitors the following weeks. On the October 10 episode of Raw, Bo Dallas teamed with Curtis Axel in a losing effort to Sami Zayn and Neville. The following week on Raw, Dallas defeated Neville with Axel in his corner, and after the match, attacked Axel. The following week, Dallas defeated Axel by pinning him while grabbing Axel's tights. On April 2, 2017, at WrestleMania 33, Dallas was part of the André the Giant Memorial Battle Royal, from which he was eliminated by the eventual winner Mojo Rawley.

==== The Miztourage and The B-Team (2017–2021) ====
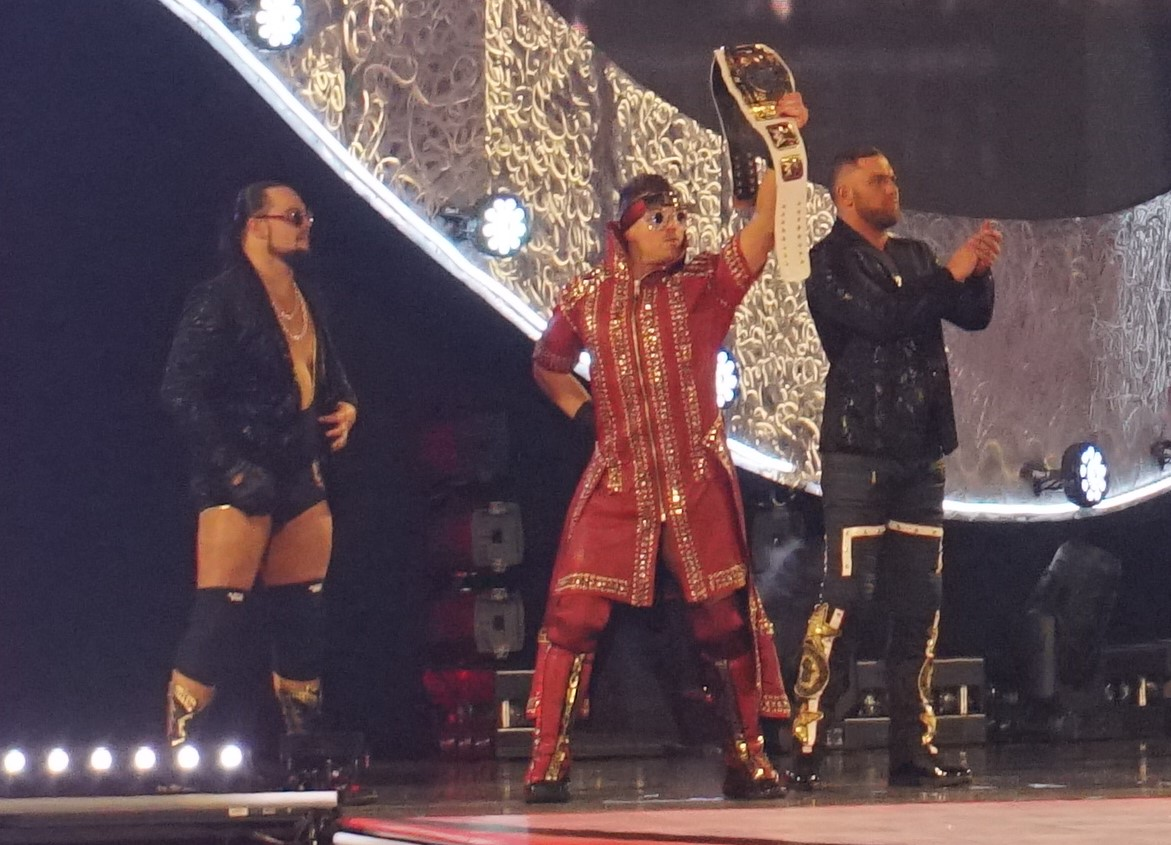
Dallas (left) with The Miz and Curtis Axel at WrestleMania 34

On the June 19, 2017, episode of Raw, Intercontinental Champion The Miz approached Dallas and Curtis Axel, offering to make them "the stars they deserve to be" if they become his entourage, and later that night, Dallas and Axel appeared in bear costumes during an in ring segment between Miz and his wife Maryse, attacking Dean Ambrose. Dallas and Axel, now dubbed The Miztourage, began helping Miz in his matches and occasionally teamed him with him, including winning efforts against Dean Ambrose, Heath Slater and Rhyno on June 26 episode of Raw and Jason Jordan and The Hardy Boyz (Jeff Hardy and Matt Hardy) at SummerSlam. At No Mercy, they also helped Miz to defeat Jason Jordan to retain his title. At WrestleMania 34 on April 8, 2018, Dallas participated in the André the Giant Memorial Battle Royal, but he failed to win. As part of the Superstar Shake-Up, Miz was moved to the SmackDown brand, while Dallas and Axel remained on Raw. On the April 16 episode of Raw, during a tag team match, Dallas and Axel turned on Miz, ending their alliance.

On the May 14 episode of Raw, the duo adopted the new team name "The B-Team" and defeated Breezango (Tyler Breeze and Fandango), their first win as a team since August 2017. On the June 4 episode of Raw, The B-Team won a tag team battle royal to determine the number one contenders for the Raw Tag Team Championships. At Extreme Rules, The B-Team defeated Bray Wyatt and Matt Hardy to win the Raw Tag Team Championship. On the July 23 episode of Raw, they successfully retained their title against Wyatt and Hardy. In the following weeks, The B-Team transitioned into faces and adopted a new entrance theme and mannerisms, this would be Dallas' first time as a face since 2013. At SummerSlam on August 19, The B-Team successfully retained their title against The Revival (Dash Wilder and Scott Dawson). On the September 3 episode of Raw, The B-Team lost the championships to Dolph Ziggler and Drew McIntyre, ending their reign at 50 days. The following week on Raw, they received a rematch for the titles, but they were unsuccessful.

At Survivor Series, The B-Team made up part of Team Raw as they took on Team SmackDown in a 10-on-10 Survivor Series tag team elimination match, and Team Raw would go on to lose the match. At WrestleMania 35 on April 7, 2019, Dallas competed in the André the Giant Memorial Battle Royal but failed to win the match. As part of the Superstar Shake-up, both Dallas and Axel were moved to the SmackDown brand. On the April 30 episode of SmackDown Live, The B-Team formed a brief alliance with Shane McMahon, thus turning heel once again. On the September 3 episode of SmackDown, Dallas became the WWE 24/7 Champion by pinning Drake Maverick on the backstage area thanks to the help of Axel, only to lose it to Maverick again some minutes later. Dallas' final televised match was at Crown Jewel in October, where he and Axel failed to win the tag team turmoil match. On the November 15, 2019 episode of SmackDown, Dallas and Axel were attacked by Braun Strowman, in what would be Dallas's final appearance in WWE under his original tenure.

In December 2019, Dallas asked WWE for time off, which was granted. He also suffered a neck injury which prevented him from working in the ring. On April 30, 2020, his tag team partner Curtis Axel was released by WWE, effectively disbanding The B-Team. On April 15, 2021, it was reported that Dallas had been released by WWE after over a year of absence, ending his 13-year stint with the company.

==== Uncle Howdy and The Wyatt Sicks (2022–2026) ====
At Extreme Rules, on October 8, 2022, Rotunda's brother Windham, known by his ring name Bray Wyatt, made his return to WWE. Soon after, a new character named Uncle Howdy began haunting Wyatt. Rotunda would then make his return to WWE and portray Howdy, first appearing as Howdy in December and allied with Wyatt in his feuds against LA Knight and Bobby Lashley. However, as Wyatt was then taken off television due to an illness, Howdy was also taken off as a result. Wyatt unexpectedly died from a heart attack in August 2023, leaving Rotunda's future as Howdy and in WWE in general unknown at the time. In April 2024, amid his in-ring hiatus, Rotunda appeared in the Peacock documentary, Bray Wyatt: Becoming Immortal, a biopic about his brother. Days later on April 5, Rotunda, along with his sister Mika, appeared at the 2024 WWE Hall of Fame ceremony to induct the tag team of their father and uncle, The U.S. Express (Mike Rotunda and Barry Windham), into the WWE Hall of Fame.

Starting on the Raw after WrestleMania XL, WWE began to tease the return of Rotunda as the Uncle Howdy character by playing ominous music during episodes of Raw and SmackDown during commercial breaks, as well as showing QR codes on screen for viewers at home, similar to the buildup to Wyatt's return in 2022. He made his official return as Uncle Howdy on the June 17 episode of Raw, appearing alongside real-life versions of Wyatt's "Firefly Fun House" puppet characters Rambling Rabbit, Mercy the Buzzard, Huskus the Pig Boy, and Abby the Witch. The group was dubbed The Wyatt Sicks. The following week, he was seen unmasked in a vignette, where he was interviewed by his alter ego Howdy, with lamenting his brother's death. Howdy made his in-ring debut on the August 26 episode of Raw, defeating Chad Gable. It was also his first match in five years. The stable's next feud was against The Miz and The Final Testament, facing each other on the December 9 episode of Raw, where The Wyatt Sicks suffered their first loss as a stable in an eight-man tag team match. The stable was drafted to the SmackDown brand, but they didn't appear on television due to Bo Dallas suffering a shoulder injury. The stable returned to television on the May 23 episode of SmackDown.

The Wyatt Sicks began a feud with the MFT. He then returned on the go-home Survivor Series WarGames November 28 episode of SmackDown (taped November 21) taking out Solo Sikoa after eliminating Sami Zayn in a traditional Survivor Series match. On April 24, Rotunda and the other members of the Wyatt Sicks were released by WWE by parent company TKO Group Holdings, that officially ended his second run and concluded his overall 17-year tenure with the company.

== Other media ==
Rotunda, as Bo Dallas, made his video game debut as a playable character in WWE 2K15, and has since appeared in WWE 2K16, WWE 2K17, WWE 2K18, WWE 2K19, WWE 2K20, and WWE 2K Battlegrounds. Rotunda, as Uncle Howdy, returned as a playable character in WWE 2K23 as DLC, WWE 2K24 and WWE 2K25. He also appears in the mobile games WWE Tap Mania, WWE Universe, and WWE SuperCard as Dallas.

== Legal issues ==
On February 19, 2012, Rotunda was arrested for driving under the influence in Tampa, Florida, with blood-alcohol levels of 0.166 and 0.178 according to two breathalyser tests, above the legal limit of 0.08. He was released later that day on a $500 bond.

In August 2016, Rotunda was arrested for public intoxication in Dallas, Texas after being ejected from a flight from Dallas/Fort Worth International Airport to Mexico City.

== Personal life ==
Rotunda was married to Swedish arm wrestling champion Sarah Bäckman from 2014 until their divorce in 2019.

Rotunda's older brother, Windham, was also a professional wrestler and was best known for performing under the ring name Bray Wyatt until his death in August 2023 at the age of 36 due to a heart attack.

== Filmography ==
Year	Title	Role	Notes
2017	The Marine 5: Battleground	Alonzo	
2024	Bray Wyatt: Becoming Immortal	Himself	Documentary of his late brother, Bray Wyatt.

== Championships and accomplishments ==
- Florida Championship Wrestling
  - FCW Florida Heavyweight Championship (3 times)
  - FCW Florida Tag Team Championship (2 times) – with Duke Rotundo/Husky Harris
- Pro Wrestling Illustrated
  - Ranked No. 73 of the top 500 singles wrestlers in the PWI 500 in 2014
- WWE
  - WWE Raw Tag Team Championship (1 time) – with Curtis Axel
  - WWE 24/7 Championship (1 time)
  - NXT Championship (1 time)
  - Slammy Award (1 time)
    - WTF Moment of the Year (2025) Wyatt Sicks debut on RAW with Erick Rowan, Dexter Lumis, Joe Gacy and Nikki Cross
