= Jake Carter (wrestler) =

American wrestler and football player

Personal information
- Born: Jesse Allen White; April 19, 1986 (age 40) Denver, Colorado, U.S.
- Education: University of Oklahoma
- Family: Big Van Vader (father)

Professional wrestling career
- Ring name(s): Jake Carter; Jesse White
- Billed height: 6 ft 2 in (1.88 m)
- Billed weight: 250 lb (110 kg)
- Billed from: Scottsdale, Arizona
- Trained by: Big Van Vader; Harley Race; Florida Championship Wrestling
- Debut: 2009
- Retired: 2013

Jesse Allen White (born April 19, 1986) is an American retired professional wrestler and former football player. During his time in WWE's developmental territories, he wrestled as Jake Carter. He is a second generation professional wrestler; his father, Leon White, competed in professional wrestling as Big Van Vader. He is also a former college football player, having played college football for the University of Oklahoma before retiring due to injuries.

== Professional wrestling career ==
White, like his father (known in professional wrestling as Big Van Vader), first embarked on a football career before trying out at professional wrestling. He joined the University of Oklahoma's football team in 2005. Hip and back injuries ended his career almost as soon as it began, but White stayed involved as a student coach for the team.

White then moved on to training to become a professional wrestler under the tutelage of his father. He wrestled matches in Japan while teaming with his father in 2010 and 2011.

It was reported on April 30, 2011, that White had signed a developmental contract with WWE. White made his televised debut for WWE's developmental territory, Florida Championship Wrestling, on the March 18, 2012, episode of FCW TV, where he was paired with Corey Graves. On the April 1 FCW TV originally taped on March 15, Carter won the Florida Tag Team Championship with Graves by defeating Bo Dallas and Husky Harris. On the April 22 FCW TV, Carter and Graves retained their title against Mike Dalton and CJ Parker. On the final FCW TV on July 15, Carter and Graves defeated Dalton and Parker again to retain their title.

When WWE rebranded its FCW into NXT, Carter's NXT television debut took place on the July 4 episode of the rebooted NXT taped at Full Sail University, where he and Graves defeated CJ Parker and Nick Rogers. After a quiet dissociation from Graves, Carter would find himself winless in televised NXT matches, which even saw Graves himself defeating Carter on the January 23, 2013, episode of NXT. Carter returned to NXT on May 30, 2013, where Carter and Brandon Traven faced Garrett Dylan and Scott Dawson in a losing effort. on the June 19 episode of NXT, Carter faced Xavier Woods in a losing effort. on September 12 episode of NXT, Carter faced Tensai in a losing effort, which turned out to be his final match with WWE.

== Championships and accomplishments ==
- Florida Championship Wrestling
  - FCW Florida Tag Team Championship (1 time) – with Corey Graves
