= Tyler Breeze =

Canadian professional wrestler (born 1988)

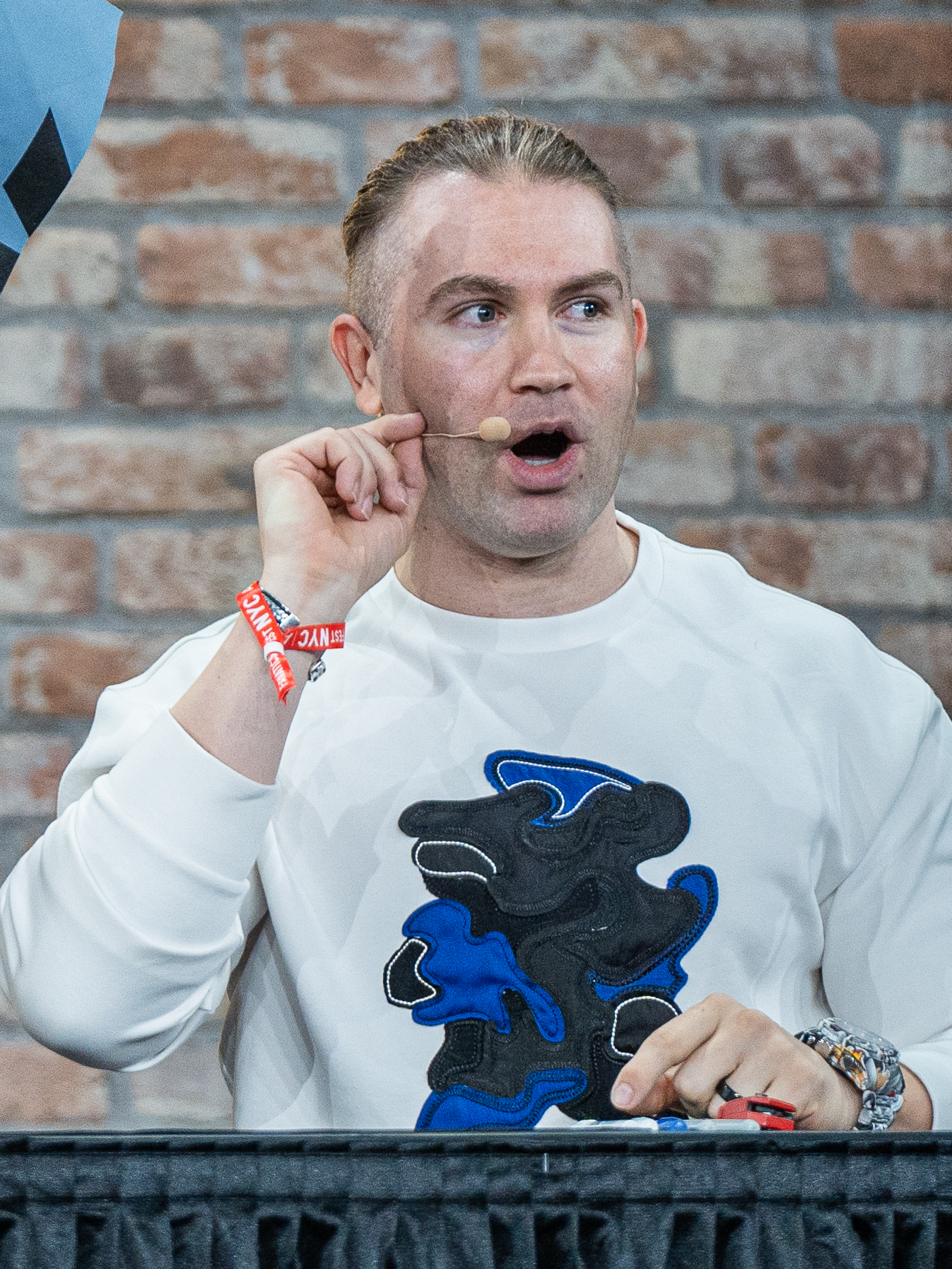
- Breeze in 2024

Personal information
- Born: Mattias Clement; January 19, 1988 (age 38) Penticton, British Columbia, Canada
- Spouses: Audrey Marie (m. 2016; div. 2019) Allison Donato (m. 2023)

Professional wrestling career
- Ring names: Matt Clement; Mattias Wild; Mike Dalton; Mike McGrath; Tyler Breeze; Breeze
- Billed height: 6 ft 0 in (183 cm)
- Billed weight: 206 lb (93 kg)
- Billed from: Daytona Beach, Florida; Penticton, British Columbia; Seasonal residences
- Trained by: Lance Storm
- Debut: 2007

Mattias Clement (born January 19, 1988) is a Canadian professional wrestler. He is best known for his tenures with WWE, where he performed under the ring name Tyler Breeze.

From 2010 to 2012, he performed under the name Mike Dalton in WWE's developmental territory Florida Championship Wrestling (FCW). While in FCW, he won the FCW Florida Heavyweight Championship and the FCW Florida Tag Team Championship (with Leakee). In 2013, he transitioned to NXT and came up with the Tyler Breeze character, a narcissistic "pretty boy" obsessed with taking selfies of himself, even during matches. In 2015, Clement was promoted to WWE's main roster, where he later teamed with Fandango to form a team known as "Breezango" and later on as "The Fashion Police" after the two began appearing in a number of comedic skits known as "The Fashion Files". In 2019, Breezango returned to NXT, with the duo winning the NXT Tag Team Championship in August 2020, before being released in 2021.

He is also a recurring member on Xavier Woods' YouTube channel UpUpDownDown, which is currently on hiatus following Woods' departure from WWE in May 2026.

In 2019, Clement opened a wrestling school called Flatbacks Wrestling in Apopka, Florida, with Shawn Spears.

== Early life ==
Mattias Clement was born on January 19, 1988 in Penticton, British Columbia. He trained under fellow professional wrestler Lance Storm at Storm's academy in Calgary.

== Professional wrestling career ==
=== Early career (2007–2010) ===
Clement made his debut for Power Zone Wrestling in 2007 under the ring name Mattias Wild. His first match was a victory over Rage O'Riley on April 25, 2007. In 2008, Clement began wrestling for NWA Extreme Canadian Championship Wrestling (ECCW). While wrestling for ECCW, Clement was trained by Lance Storm in Calgary, Alberta. On May 2, Clement won a match against Alex Plexis to qualify for the first round of the 2009 Pacific Cup; he then lost in the first round to Billy Suede on June 6, 2009. On September 5, 2009, he lost a tag team match with Dan Myers against the team of "The Icons" Jamie Diaz and Nick Price in a first round match for the ECCW Tag Team Championship. The teams then began a feud, with Price and Diaz coming out on top on most occasions. Clement then worked for Prairie Wrestling Alliance in 2010, returning to ECCW for a last match on September 11, 2010, which he lost to Billy Suede.

=== World Wrestling Entertainment/WWE ===
==== Florida Championship Wrestling (2010–2012) ====
After signing with World Wrestling Entertainment (WWE), Clement made his debut for WWE's developmental territory Florida Championship Wrestling (FCW) on December 2, 2010, at a live event as Matt Clement, where he defeated Big E Langston, Darren Young, Leakee and 2 others. The following month he was called Mike McGrath, which lasted 3 months, only to be changed again to Mike Dalton in April 2011. Dalton made his television debut on the July 17, 2011, episode of FCW TV in a loss to Alexander Rusev. He earned another win in FCW on November 17, 2011, against Peter Orlov. On December 15, Dalton won a battle royal to be named the number-one contender to the FCW Florida Heavyweight Championship. He challenged Leo Kruger, but lost the match. Dalton won the FCW Heavyweight Championship on February 2, 2012, when he defeated Kruger. His reign lasted 21 days and he lost the rematch and the title to Kruger.

==== NXT (2012–2015) ====
When WWE rebranded FCW into NXT Wrestling, Dalton debuted as an enhancement talent on the June 20, 2012, episode of rebooted NXT show, where he teamed with CJ Parker and lost to The Ascension (Kenneth Cameron and Conor O'Brian). Dalton got his first victory when he teamed with Jason Jordan and defeated the team of Hunico and Camacho on August 1 but lost in a rematch against the two a few weeks later.

In the beginning of 2013, seeing that Dalton's character hadn't received much of the fans' attention, WWE officials informed him that in order to remain with WWE he should get a new character. On the July 24 episode of NXT, Clement re–debuted with his new heel gimmick, as Tyler Breeze, a narcissistic "pretty boy" obsessed with taking selfies, even during matches; and later was revealed that Clement himself came up with the character, with Triple H giving him the suggestion of using an iPhone to take pictures as a way to make the character more modern. Soon after, Breeze started a feud with CJ Parker, after repeatedly being "photobombed" by Parker. After the two were put in a tag team match against Enzo Amore and Colin Cassady, which they lost after Parker refused to tag in Breeze, a match between the two took place on the October 16 episode of NXT, which Breeze won. Two weeks later, Parker defeated Breeze in a rematch, and ended their feud.

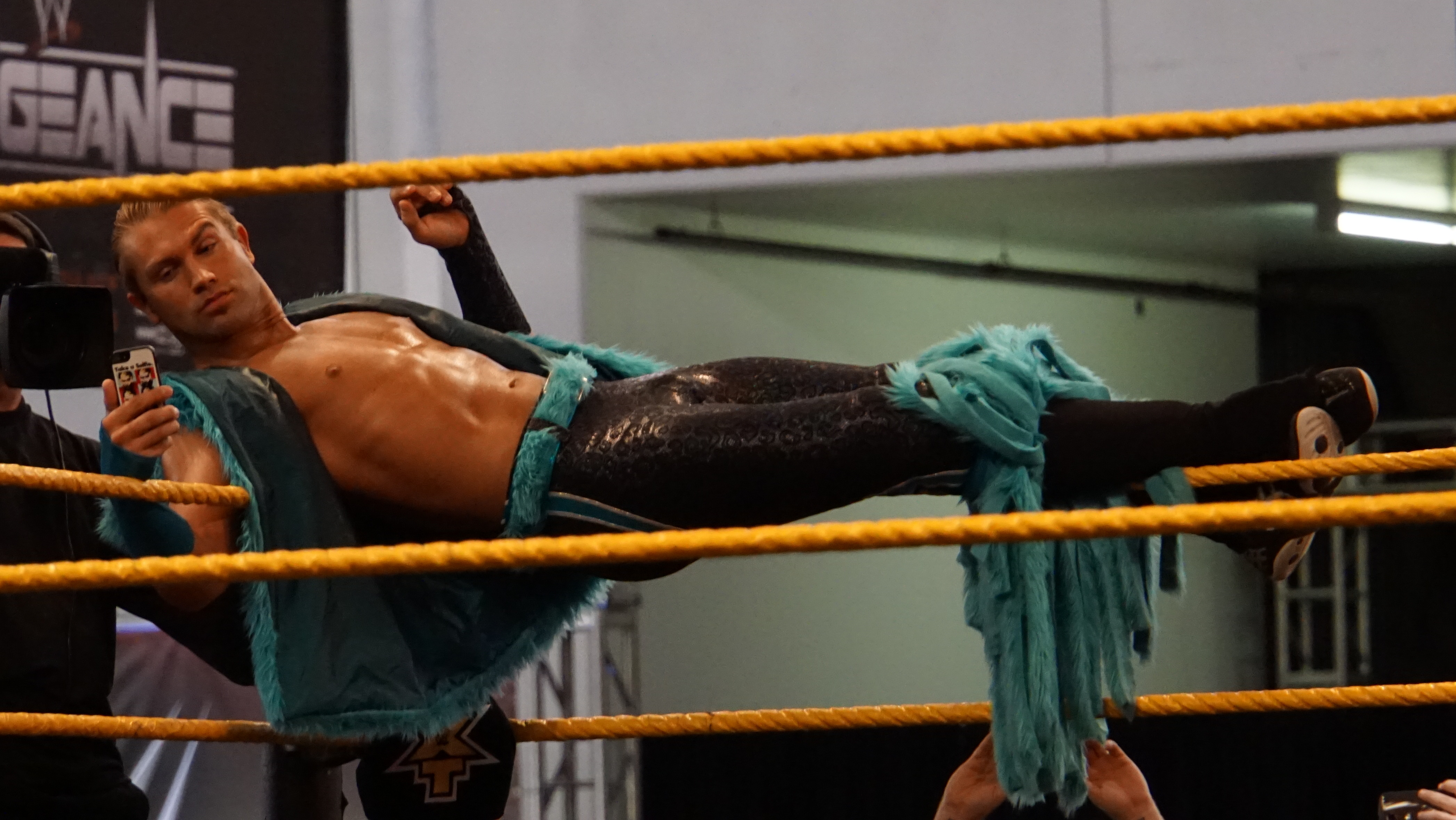
Breeze performing his signature pose

In December, Breeze helped Bo Dallas retain the NXT Championship during a lumberjack match against Adrian Neville, which resulted a match between the two on the January 15, 2014, episode of NXT, where Neville was victorious. Breeze retorted later that Neville was not good-looking, mocking his nickname. The next month, in a rematch, Neville once again defeated Breeze. On February 27, at NXT Arrival, Breeze was scheduled to face Xavier Woods, but both men were attacked by Alexander Rusev, rendering the match a no contest. Throughout March, Breeze continued his feud with Woods, by attacking him before a match with Rusev, before the two faced each other in a match, which Breeze won. On the May 8 episode of NXT, Breeze participated in a 20-man battle royal, for a shot at the NXT Championship, and was involved in a three-way tie. As a result, Breeze faced the other two winners, Sami Zayn and Tyson Kidd in a triple–threat match on the following week, which Kidd won. On May 29, at NXT TakeOver, Breeze defeated Sami Zayn in another number one contender's match but in mid–June he suffered a broken finger, which kept him out of action for a month. Breeze returned on the July 24 episode of NXT, defeating Mojo Rawley and received his title match against champion Adrian Neville on the August 14 episode of NXT, but was unsuccessful after Kidd interfered and caused a disqualification. This led to a match between Breeze and Kidd on the following week, which Kidd won, when Breeze counted himself out. On September 11, Breeze, along with Zayn and Kidd, once again challenged unsuccessfully for the title at NXT TakeOver: Fatal 4-Way. Prior to this, Breeze made his main roster debut on the September 8 episode of Raw, teaming with Kidd in a match against Neville and Zayn, to hype their title match. Throughout the next months, Breeze competed in various matches, but was not involved in any feud.

On the December 18 episode of NXT, a cell phone vignette from Breeze aired, claiming that he was taking a short break from NXT to model overseas. He returned on the January 8, 2015, episode of NXT, defeating the debuting Chad Gable. On the January 21 episode of NXT, Breeze was defeated by Hideo Itami in a first round match of a tournament to determine the new number one contender for the NXT Championship. In a rematch at NXT TakeOver: Rival, on February 11, Itami again defeated Breeze. Breeze's rivalry with Itami continued and the two along with Finn Bálor were scheduled for a triple–threat number one contender's match at NXT TakeOver: Unstoppable, on May 20, however, Itami was attacked in the parking lot, and the match was turned into a one on one between Breeze and Bálor, which Bálor won. During the tapings of NXT, on July 16, William Regal scheduled Breeze to wrestle Jushin Thunder Liger at NXT TakeOver: Brooklyn, on August 22. Breeze called himself the "Face of the Rising Sun" until Liger won. Breeze then entered the Dusty Rhodes Tag Team Classic tournament, where he was paired with Bull Dempsey. The two were eliminated from the tournament by Tommaso Ciampa and Johnny Gargano on the September 9 episode of NXT when Dempsey got pinned. This led to a match between the two on the September 23 episode of NXT, which Breeze won. On October 7, at NXT TakeOver: Respect, Breeze competed in a match against Apollo Crews, which he lost. It was his final match at NXT, as Breeze was called up to the main roster after the event by Triple H.

==== Singles main roster run (2015–2016) ====
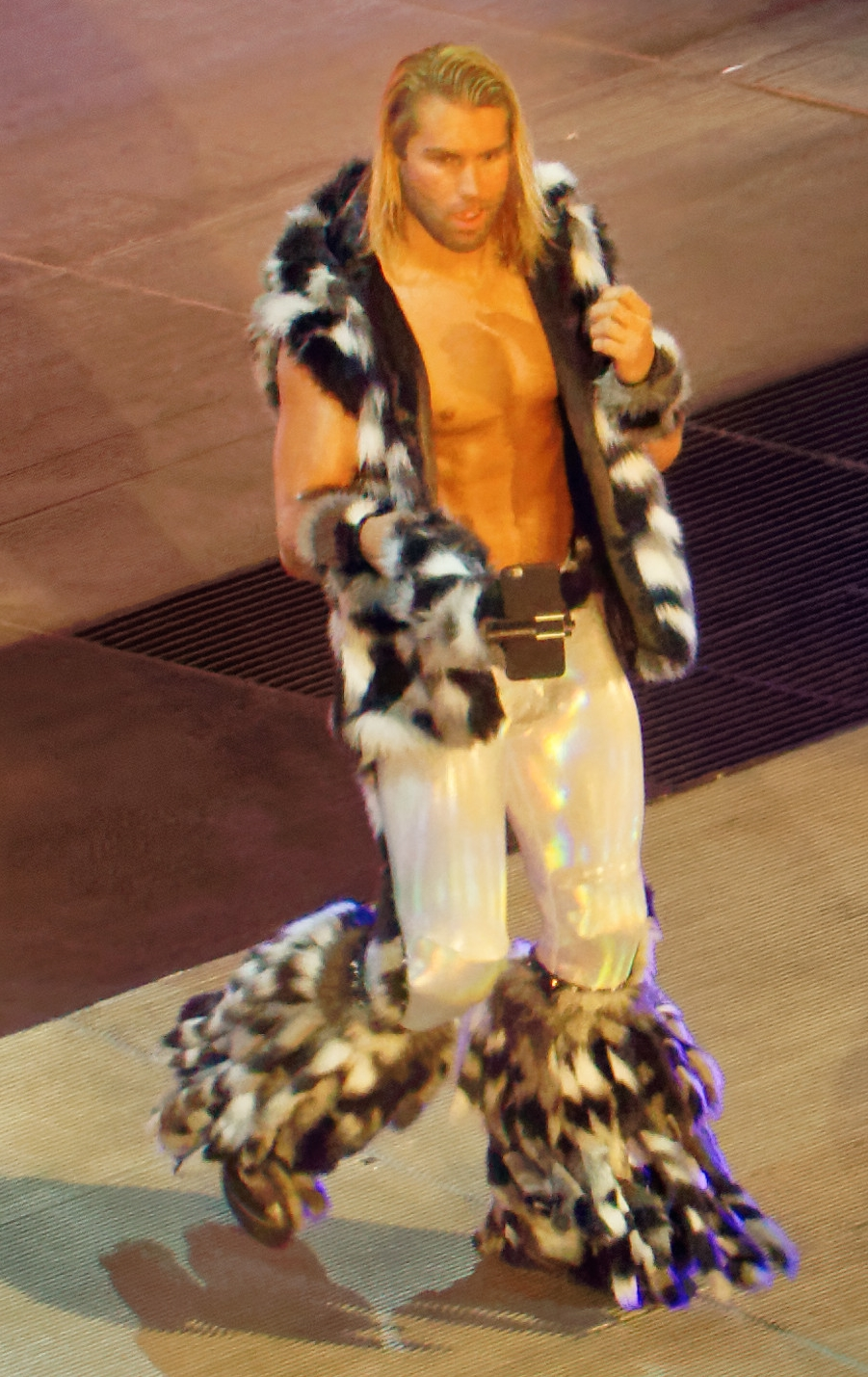
Breeze in April 2016

On the October 22, 2015, episode of SmackDown, Breeze was promoted to WWE's main roster, appearing during a Miz TV segment, after being introduced by Summer Rae, and attacked Dolph Ziggler. On the November 9 episode of Raw, Breeze made his in–ring debut, losing to Dean Ambrose in a first round match from the WWE World Heavyweight Championship tournament. Throughout November, Breeze continued his feud with Ziggler, resulting in a match at Survivor Series, which Breeze won. However, Ziggler defeated Breeze on Raw and SmackDown, in two rematches, to officially end their feud. After competing in various matches, Breeze and Summer Rae amicably went their separate ways on the December 31 episode of SmackDown.

"Zack Ryder def. Tyler Breeze by pinfall - Yes, you read that correctly. Breeze's descent into jobber hell continues; boy, does that season finale of Breaking Ground look ill-judged now".

— Wrestling Observer Newsletter writer Alan O'Brien commenting on an episode of Main Event in March 2016

Starting on the January 11, 2016, episode of Raw, Breeze went on a winless streak for over 20 televised matches, including losing to the likes of Zack Ryder and Jack Swagger on Main Event or Superstars. At Royal Rumble, Breeze was eliminated within two minutes in his first Royal Rumble match by Roman Reigns and AJ Styles. On the February 15 episode of Raw, Breeze competed in a five way match against Dean Ambrose, Kevin Owens, Stardust and Dolph Ziggler for Ambrose's WWE Intercontinental Championship, where Breeze was pinned by Owens. At WrestleMania 32, Breeze competed in the André the Giant Memorial Trophy, where he was eliminated by Mark Henry.

==== Breezango (2016–2021) ====
On the April 28 episode of SmackDown, Breeze formed an alliance with R-Truth. On the May 2 episode of Raw, Breeze defeated Goldust after interference by Truth. On the May 12 episode of SmackDown, a tag team match pitting Breeze and Truth against Goldust and Fandango ended with a quirky result when Breeze and Fandango turned on their partners, who had refused to fight each other. Breeze aligned with Fandango, adopting the name "Breezango". The new team defeated The Golden Truth (Goldust and R-Truth) a week later on Raw but lost a rematch at the Money in the Bank, ending the feud. After being drafted to SmackDown brand as a result of the WWE draft, Breezango defeated The Usos on July 24 at Battleground. Breezango then entered a tournament to determine the inaugural SmackDown Tag Team Champions; they were eliminated in the first round by American Alpha. On the November 8 episode of SmackDown Live, Breezango defeated The Vaudevillains to qualify for Team SmackDown for the 10-on-10 Survivor Series Tag Team Elimination match at Survivor Series; they were the first team eliminated from the match, which was ultimately won by Team Raw. During this time, Breezango began to refer themselves as "Fashion Police". At WrestleMania 33, Breeze took part in the André the Giant Memorial Battle Royal, which he failed to win.

On the April 25, 2017, episode of SmackDown Live, Breezango defeated The Ascension in a Beat the Clock challenge match, becoming number one contenders for the SmackDown Tag Team Championship.. At Backlash, Breezango unsuccessfully challenged The Usos for the SmackDown Tag Team Championship. Breezango lost to Kevin Owens and Sami Zayn at Survivor Series and to The Bludgeon Brothers at Clash of Champions. On March 11, 2018, at Fastlane, Breezango teamed with Tye Dillinger to defeat Mojo Rawley, Chad Gable and Shelton Benjamin in a six-man tag team match. At WrestleMania 34, Breeze competed in the André the Giant Battle Royal, but was unsuccessful. On April 16, Breezango were moved to Raw brand as part of Superstar Shake-up. On that night, they defeated Cesaro and Sheamus. On July 6, it was reported that Fandango had suffered a left labrum tear in his shoulder that would put him out of action for six months, which was why Breeze had been inactive.

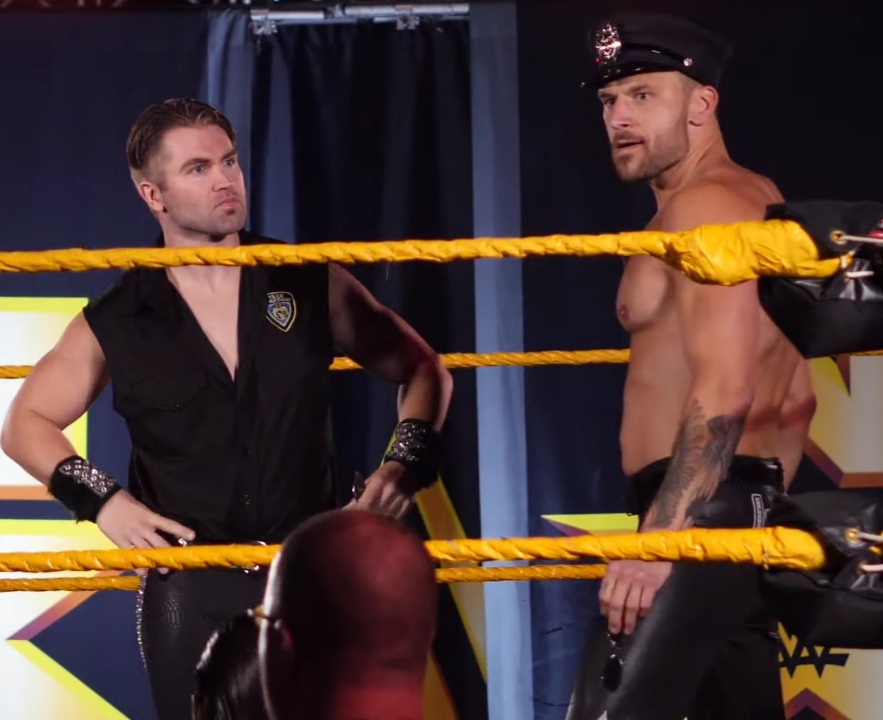
Breezango at NXT

At the end of the year, Breeze and Fandango were sent to NXT. According to Dave Meltzer, WWE assigned them to the brand to work as experienced veterans to work with the younger talent and to help NXT's rating during the Wednesday Night War against the All Elite Wrestling's Dynamite. Breeze made his return on the December 12 episode of NXT, as the surprise opponent for Ricochet's NXT North American Championship match in a losing effort. On the December 17 episode of Raw, Breeze answered Dean Ambrose's open challenge for the Intercontinental Championship, which he lost. At WrestleMania 35, Breeze competed in the André the Giant Memorial Battle Royal, which was won by Braun Strowman. On April 25, 2019, Breeze started appearing at NXT live events. On the May 22 episode of NXT, Breeze returned to NXT as a full-time performer, where he interrupted NXT North American Champion Velveteen Dream and took a selfie with him, but then attacked him. It was announced that Breeze would face Velveteen Dream for the NXT North American Championship at NXT TakeOver: XXV, where he lost.

Fandango returned from injury on the July 31, 2019, episode of NXT, saving Breeze from a post-match attack by The Forgotten Sons (Jaxson Ryker, Steve Cutler and Wesley Blake). Breezango began a feud with The Forgotten Sons, defeating them in tag team action as well as in a six-man tag action with Isaiah "Swerve" Scott as their partner. However, in December, Fandango was sidelined with another injury as he announced he had undergone ulnar collateral ligament reconstruction (Tommy John surgery) with an expected recovery of six to twelve months. On the June 3 episode of NXT, Breeze once again reunited with Fandango after his return from injury as they defeated Oney Lorcan and Danny Burch, and The Undisputed Era in a number one contender's match for the NXT Tag Team Championship. On the June 17 episode of NXT, Breezango failed to win the titles from Imperium (Fabian Aichner and Marcel Barthel), after interference from both Lorcan and Burch and Indus Sher (Rinku and Saurav).

At NXT TakeOver XXX, Breezango defeated Oney Lorcan and Danny Burch, and Legado del Fantasma (Joaquin Wilde and Raul Mendoza) in a triple threat tag team match to become the number one contenders for the NXT Tag Team Championship. On the August 26, 2020, episode of NXT, Breezango defeated Imperium to win the titles. on the October 21 episode of NXT, Breezango lost the titles to Danny Burch and Oney Lorcan ending their reign at 56 days. On the November 11 episode of NXT, they failed to regain the titles from Lorcan and Burch in a rematch.

In early 2021, Breezango participated in Dusty Rhodes Tag Team Classic, but were defeated by The Undisputed Era (Adam Cole and Roderick Strong) in the first round. On the June 15 episode of NXT, they defeated Imperium in what would be their final match in WWE. On June 25, 2021, Breeze, along with Fandango, was released from his WWE contracts.

==== Backstage roles (2022–2026) ====
In October 2022, Breeze revealed that he worked as a guest coach at the WWE Performance Center. He also re-joined Xavier Woods' UpUpDownDown YouTube channel in which he was made the co-host, a role that allowed him to stay under contract with WWE and did not prevent him from taking outside indie bookings. In early 2025, Breeze began working as a writer for NXT. On the September 9 episode of NXT, Breeze made his surprise television appearance on NXT and challenged NXT North American Champion Ethan Page for the title at NXT Homecoming. On September 1, 2026, Clement announced on X that he was no longer under contract with WWE.

=== Independent circuit (2023–present) ===
Breeze wrestled his first match in over two years for Next Generation Wrestling defeating Matt Cross to win the NGW TN Title.

== Other media ==
Clement made a cameo appearance in an updated video for The Chainsmokers song "Selfie" in 2014.

In February 2016, Clement started his own YouTube series called Shootin' the Breeze, where Clement portrays his Breeze character answering fan questions. The first five episodes were released on Clement's own YouTube channel, before being moved to WWE's channel in March.

Breeze is a recurring guest on Xavier Woods' YouTube channel UpUpDownDown, where he goes by the nickname 'Prince Pretty'. In November 2019, Breeze defeated Alexa Bliss in a game of Saturday Night Slam Masters to win the UpUpDownDown Championship, immediately after Bliss had won the championship in the finals of a Brawlhalla tournament. It was around this time that longtime friends Breeze and Woods started season 2 of their “Battle of the Brands” series, and Woods challenged Breeze to a match for the first pick. However, due to Woods being injured, he chose Cesaro as his replacement. During the match Cesaro turned on Woods and joined Breeze, forming “LeftRightLeftRight” along with Adam Cole.

As Tyler Breeze, he made his video game debut as a playable character in WWE 2K16, and has since appeared in WWE 2K17, WWE 2K18, WWE 2K19, WWE 2K20, WWE 2K22, WWE 2K23, WWE 2K24, WWE 2K25, and WWE 2K26.

With his WWE release in 2021, 'Prince Pretty' left the show as a character and co-host temporarily, but returned in 2022 to take on Austin Creed once again in the 'Battle of the Brands' via WWE 2K22.

== Personal life ==
In September 2016, Clement married Ashley Miller, better known as Audrey Marie. They divorced in 2019. In 2020, Clement began dating former Tampa Bay Lightning Girl Allison Donato. The couple were married on June 22, 2023, and announced that they were pregnant with their first child, a boy. On December 7, 2023, on the UpUpDownDown YouTube channel he announced that their son was born in November.

In May 2019, Clement and Ronnie Arneill (best known as Shawn Spears) opened a wrestling school in Apopka, Florida, called Flatbacks Wrestling.

== Championships and accomplishments ==
- Florida Championship Wrestling
  - FCW Florida Heavyweight Championship (1 time)
  - FCW Florida Tag Team Championship (1 time) – with Leakee
- Next Generation Wrestling
  - NGW Championship (2 times, current)
- Prairie Wrestling Alliance
  - PWA Canadian Tag Team Championship (1 time) – with Dan Myers
- Pro Wrestling Illustrated
  - Ranked No. 61 of the top 500 wrestlers in the PWI 500 in 2015
- WWE
  - NXT Tag Team Championship (1 time) – with Fandango
  - Bumpy Award (1 time)
    - UpUpDownDown Gamer of the Half-Year (2021)
