= Jason Jordan =

American professional wrestler (born 1988)

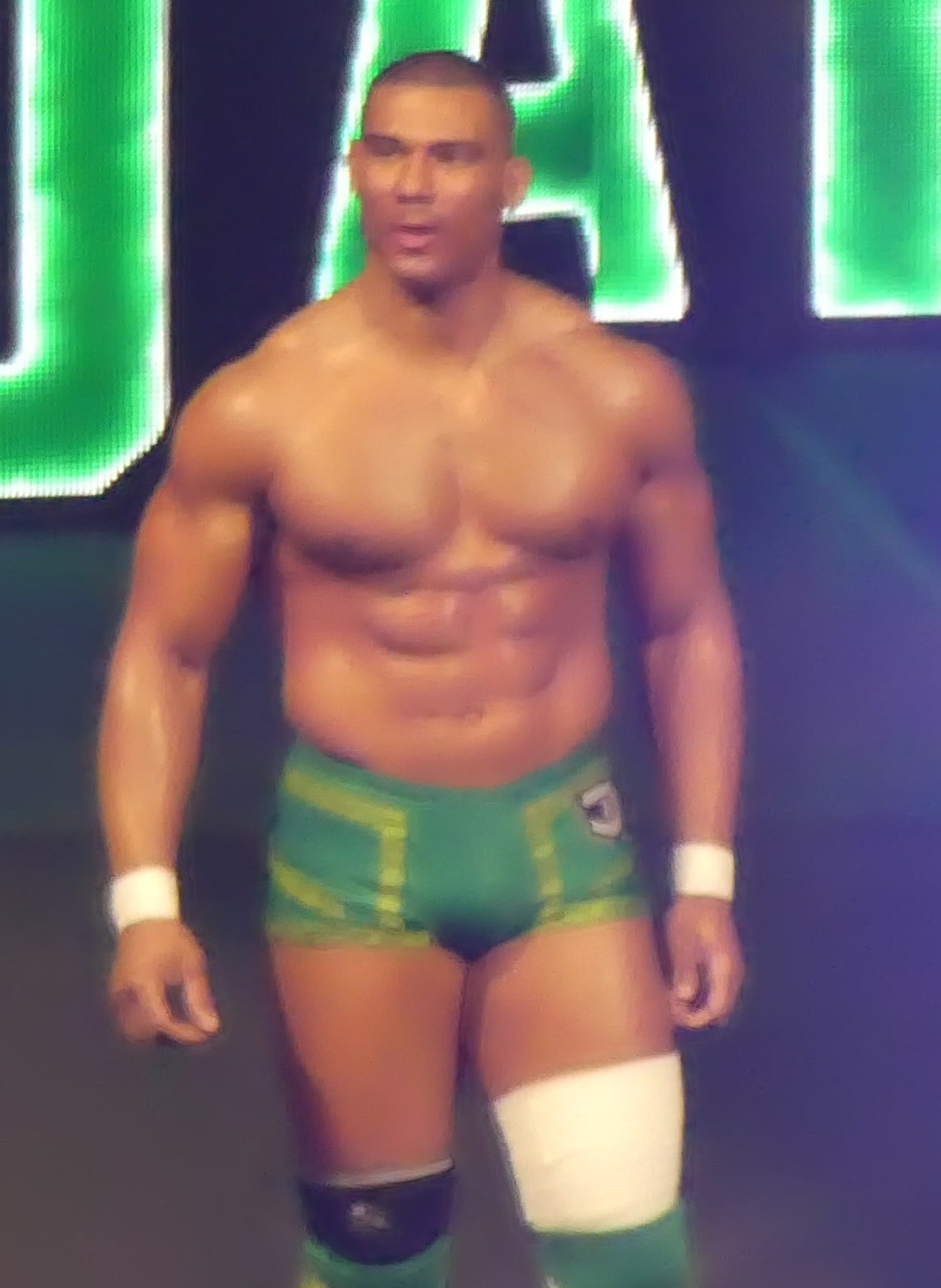
- Jordan in 2017

Personal information
- Born: Nathan Everhart; September 28, 1988 (age 38) Tinley Park, Illinois, U.S.
- Education: Indiana University
- Spouse: April Elizabeth (m. 2017)
- Children: 1

Professional wrestling career
- Ring name: Jason Jordan
- Billed height: 6 ft 3 in (191 cm)
- Billed weight: 245 lb (111 kg)
- Billed from: Chicago, Illinois
- Trained by: Florida Championship Wrestling; WWE Performance Center
- Debut: September 30, 2011
- Retired: January 28, 2018

Nathan Everhart (born September 28, 1988) is an American retired professional wrestler. He is signed to WWE, where he works as the lead producer for Raw and SmackDown. He is best known for performing with WWE under the ring name Jason Jordan from 2011 to 2018.

Jordan signed a contract with WWE in 2011 and was sent to its developmental territory Florida Championship Wrestling (FCW), before debuting in NXT the following year. In 2015, he formed the tag team American Alpha with Chad Gable, with the duo capturing the NXT Tag Team Championship before being drafted to SmackDown brand and winning the SmackDown Tag Team Championship. In 2017, American Alpha disbanded when Jordan debuted on the Raw brand as the son of Kurt Angle and subsequently formed a short-lived tag team with Seth Rollins, with whom he won the Raw Tag Team Championship in December 2017. He is the first of eight men to win the Raw, SmackDown, and NXT Tag Team Championships. He also held the FCW Tag Team Championship once with CJ Parker. He retired in 2018 due to a neck injury and has been working as a producer since then.

== Early life ==
Nathan Everhart was born in Tinley Park, Illinois, on September 28, 1988. He has three brothers, two of whom would later be imprisoned for undisclosed crimes—one of them for life. He has said that he began amateur wrestling at the age of seven because he mistakenly believed it to be the same as professional wrestling. While at Victor J. Andrew High School, he competed in wrestling, football, and baseball. He attended Indiana University, taking part in wrestling, competed in the Big Ten Conference and became a three-time national qualifier for NCAA at the Division I level.

While wrestling at Indiana University, Everhart was ranked in the top 15 in the nation for three years in a row. In his senior year, he was undefeated in the regular season, going 35-0 and at one point was ranked as high as 2nd in the nation. During his fourth year of wrestling, he worked as a student coach at his university and helped two All-Americans at 197 lbs and a heavyweight. Everhart graduated with a bachelor's degree in biology with minors in chemistry, social science, and medicine. He put attending dental school on hold to pursue his dream of being a professional wrestler. Due to his accolades at Indiana University, he had his face painted onto the wall of the campus gym in 2010.

== Professional wrestling career ==
=== WWE (2011-present) ===
==== Early career (2011–2015) ====
Everhart was scouted from college by WWE's road agent, Gerald Brisco. He was recruited to participate in a WWE tryout in 2010 and was subsequently offered a WWE contract, but he held off from signing it until finishing his college degree. In July 2011, he signed a developmental contract with WWE and was sent to the developmental territory Florida Championship Wrestling (FCW), where he took the ring name, Jason Jordan. His first professional wrestling match was at an FCW live event on September 30, where he teamed with Abraham Washington in a losing effort against Big E Langston and Calvin Raines. He made his televised debut on the November 13 episode of FCW TV, teaming with Colin Cassady and Mike Dalton in a losing effort against The Ascension. Jordan continued to make sporadic appearances in FCW until the brand was replaced by NXT in 2012. Prior to this, he won the FCW Florida Tag Team Championship with CJ Parker at a live event on July 13, making him one half of the penultimate title-holders before the championship was deactivated.

On the June 27, 2012, episode of NXT, Jordan made his NXT debut, losing to Jinder Mahal. He continued to make further occasional appearances throughout 2012 and 2013. In April 2014, Jordan formed a tag team with Tye Dillinger, but the two found little success and split up in February 2015.

==== American Alpha (2015–2017) ====
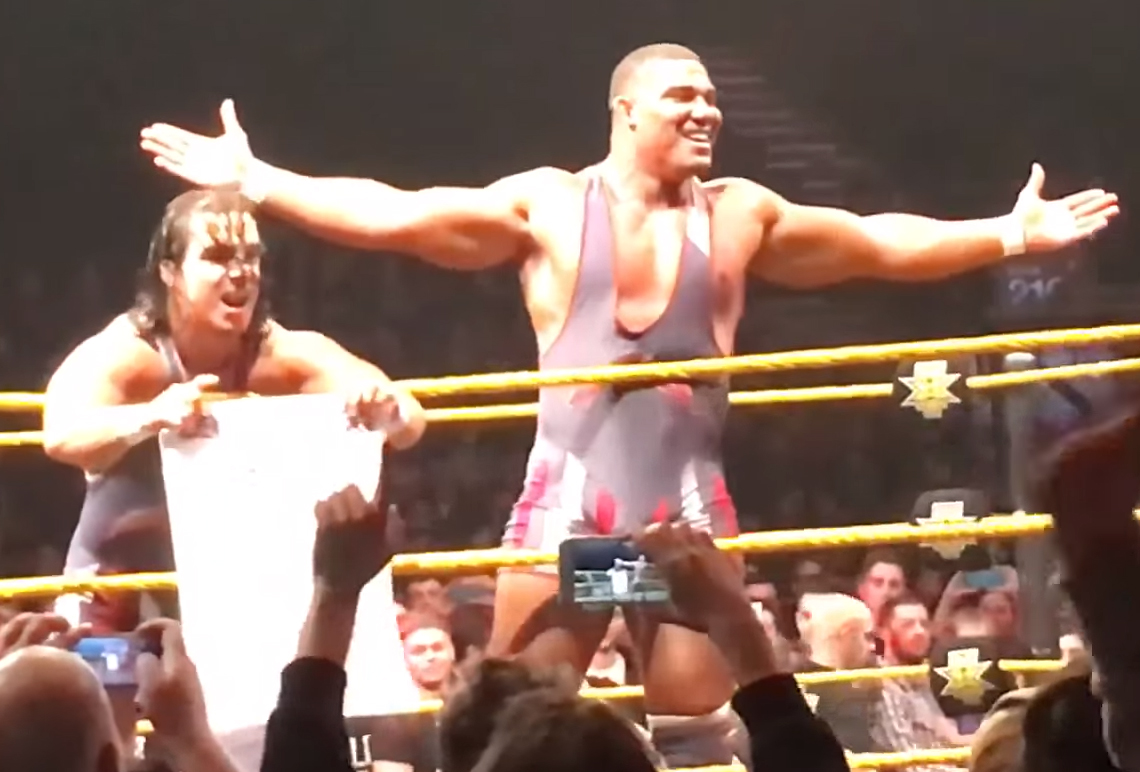
Jordan (right) with Chad Gable in 2015

In May 2015, Jordan began a storyline with Chad Gable in which Gable attempted to convince Jordan to form a new partnership, but Jordan would turn down his offer on two different occasions, while at the same time he competed in tag team action in losing efforts, such as losing to the Vaudevillains alongside Marcus Louis and losing to Enzo and Cass alongside Sylvester Lefort. On the July 15 episode of NXT, after nearly three months of coaxing, Jordan finally agreed to a match with Gable as his tag team partner, where they defeated Elias Samson and Steve Cutler. On the September 2 episode of NXT, Jordan and Gable competed in the first round of the Dusty Rhodes Tag Team Classic tournament, defeating Neville and Solomon Crowe. On September 26 at a live event, they defeated The Hype Bros in the second round before falling to Baron Corbin and Rhyno in the semi-finals at NXT TakeOver: Respect. Originally villains, Jordan and Gable turned into fan favorites during this match by showing fighting spirit and resiliency against Corbin and Rhyno. In the following weeks on NXT, Jordan and Gable defeated former NXT Tag Team Champions, The Ascension on the November 18 episode of NXT, and The Vaudevillains on the December 2 episode of NXT.

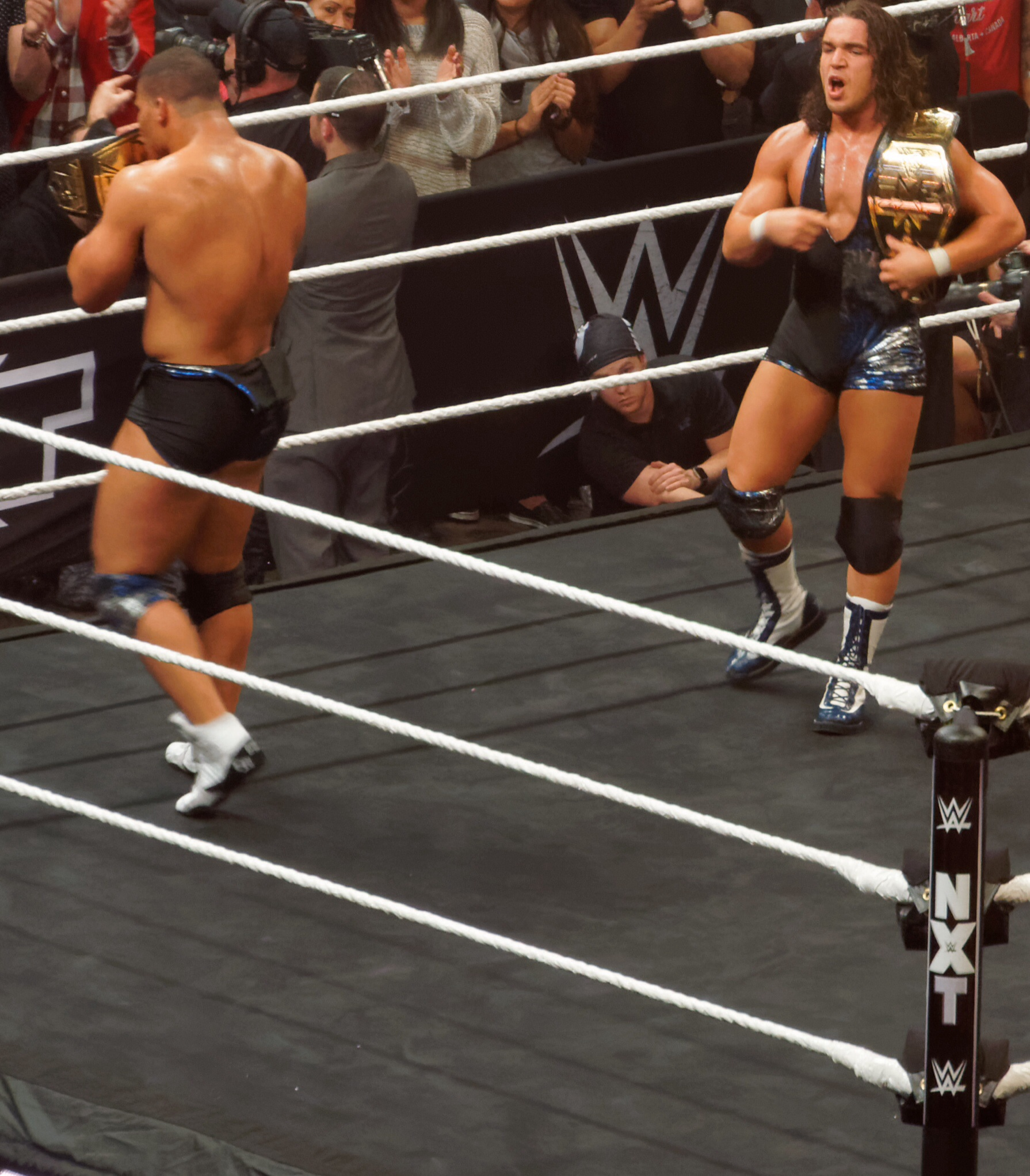
American Alpha after winning the NXT Tag Team Championship at the NXT TakeOver: Dallas event in April 2016

On the January 27, 2016, episode of NXT, Jordan and Gable began using the name American Alpha and defeated Blake and Murphy. On the March 16 episode of NXT, American Alpha defeated The Vaudevillains to become the number one contenders for the NXT Tag Team Championship. At NXT TakeOver: Dallas, American Alpha defeated The Revival to win the NXT Tag Team Championship. At the NXT TakeOver: The End on June 8, they lost the tag team titles back to The Revival, ending their reign at 68 days. After the match, they were attacked by the debuting Authors of Pain. On the July 20 episode of NXT, American Alpha made their final NXT appearance, losing to The Authors of Pain.

On July 19, Jordan and Gable were drafted to SmackDown brand as part of 2016 WWE draft. On the August 2 episode of SmackDown Live, American Alpha made their debut, defeating The Vaudevillains. At the SummerSlam pre-show, American Alpha teamed with The Hype Bros and The Usos to defeat Breezango, The Ascension, and The Vaudevillains in a 12-man tag team match. Starting on the August 23 episode of SmackDown Live, American Alpha would compete in a tag team tournament for the SmackDown Tag Team Championship, defeating Breezango in the first round to advance to the semi-finals where they faced The Usos. On the September 6 episode of SmackDown Live, despite defeating The Usos, Gable's knee was kayfabe injured during a post-match assault when The Usos attacked them, rendering American Alpha unable to compete at the final. On the November 1 episode of SmackDown Live, American Alpha defeated Spirit Squad to become part of Team SmackDown in the 10–on–10 traditional Survivor Series tag team elimination match. At Survivor Series, American Alpha would be eliminated in the match by Luke Gallows and Karl Anderson, where Team SmackDown would be defeated by Team Raw.

On the December 27 episode of SmackDown Live, American Alpha defeated The Wyatt Family to capture the SmackDown Tag Team Championship in a four-corner elimination match, also featuring The Usos, and Heath Slater and Rhyno. At Elimination Chamber on February 12, 2017, American Alpha would successfully defend their titles in a tag team turmoil match. On the March 21 episode of SmackDown Live, American Alpha lost the SmackDown Tag Team Championship to The Usos, ending their reign at 84 days. Jordan made his WrestleMania debut at WrestleMania 33, participated in the André the Giant Memorial Battle Royal, which was won by Mojo Rawley. American Alpha then seemed to quietly split up, as Gable began wrestling by himself, including getting a championship match with Kevin Owens on the June 20 episode of SmackDown Live.

==== Storyline with Kurt Angle (2017–2018) ====
On the July 17 episode of Raw, Jordan was revealed to be the kayfabe son of Raw General Manager Kurt Angle, following Angle coming clean after a series of mystery text messages were sent to his work phone and to Corey Graves from the announce team. After that, Jordan was moved to Raw, thus disbanding American Alpha. The following week on Raw, in his first match for the brand, Jordan would defeat Curt Hawkins. In August, Jordan started a feud with Intercontinental Champion The Miz, after he insulted Jordan on his talk-show segment Miz TV. On the August 14 episode of Raw, Jordan faced Miz for the Intercontinental Championship, but won by disqualification when The Miztourage (Bo Dallas and Curtis Axel) interfered on Miz's behalf, which meant that Miz retained the title as it can not change hands by disqualification. Jordan would be saved from an attack from the trio after the Hardy Boyz arrived and assisted Jordan. This would lead to a six-man tag team match at SummerSlam, where Jordan and The Hardy Boyz were defeated by The Miz and The Miztourage. On the September 18 episode of Raw, Jordan would win a Six-Pack Challenge match to become number one contender for the Intercontinental Championship against The Miz. At No Mercy on September 24, Jordan was unsuccessful in capturing the title following outside interference from The Miztourage.

Jordan was then placed in a feud with Elias, after Jordan would interrupt Elias during his songs by throwing vegetables at him. This would lead to a match between the two at TLC: Tables, Ladders & Chairs, where Jordan defeated Elias. On the November 6 episode of Raw, Jordan defeated Elias in a Guitar-on-a-Pole match, thus ending their feud. Jordan was named the fifth member of team Raw at Survivor Series. On the November 13 episode of Raw, Jordan injured his leg at the hands of Bray Wyatt. Due to his leg injury, he was out of the Survivor Series match and was replaced by the returning Triple H, who gave Jordan a pedigree. In December, Jordan would start to wrestle along with Seth Rollins, replacing Rollins' injured tag team partner Dean Ambrose. On the December 25 episode of Raw, Jordan and Rollins defeated Cesaro and Sheamus to capture the Raw Tag Team Championship. With the win, Jordan became the first person in WWE to hold the Raw, SmackDown and NXT Tag Team Championships. However, at Royal Rumble on January 28, 2018, they lost the titles back to Cesaro and Sheamus, ending their reign at 34 days. This turned out to be his final WWE televised match. Jordan's inability to participate much in the action cost both the titles, continuing (kayfabe) friction between the two that was thought to ultimately spark a heel turn for Jordan. In reality, Jordan had not been involved in physicality building to the event due to nursing a back injury.

==== Career-ending injury and producer role (2018–present) ====
On the February 5 episode of Raw, Jordan told Rollins that he wouldn't compete in a tag team match that night, before Rollins' long-time teammate Roman Reigns teamed up with Rollins instead. Later that night, Jordan cost Rollins and Reigns a match for the Raw Tag Team Championship, before Kurt Angle sent him home. This was done to write Jordan off television. On the next day, WWE reported that Jordan underwent successful surgery to repair a neck injury. After that surgery, it was reported that he would be out of action for over a year. According to Jon Robinson, author of the book Creating The Mania: An Inside Look at how WrestleMania Comes to Life, the storyline with Kurt Angle would conclude at WrestleMania 34 in a match between them, and during an interview with Kurt Angle the following year, Angle revealed that his WrestleMania 35 opponent Baron Corbin got Jordan's spot due to Jordan's serious injury.

After his in-ring injury, Jordan began working as a producer. Jordan made his first television appearance in over two years on the May 29, 2020, episode of SmackDown, walking alongside police officers who were arresting Jeff Hardy. In April 2021, Jordan was reportedly promoted to a new role of lead producer overseeing all other producers at TV tapings. On the December 9, 2022, episode of SmackDown, Jordan made an appearance during the birthday celebration of his storyline father Kurt Angle.

== Other media ==
Jordan appears as a playable character in the video games WWE 2K17, WWE 2K18, and WWE 2K19. His entrance motion and finisher the “Back Suplex Neckbreaker” is still in the WWE 2K games.

== Personal life ==
Everhart married April Elizabeth on March 17, 2017. They reside in Land O’ Lakes, Florida, and have a daughter born on June 21, 2020.

He is good friends with his former tag team partner Chad Gable, who he says is "like a brother" to him.

== Championships and accomplishments ==
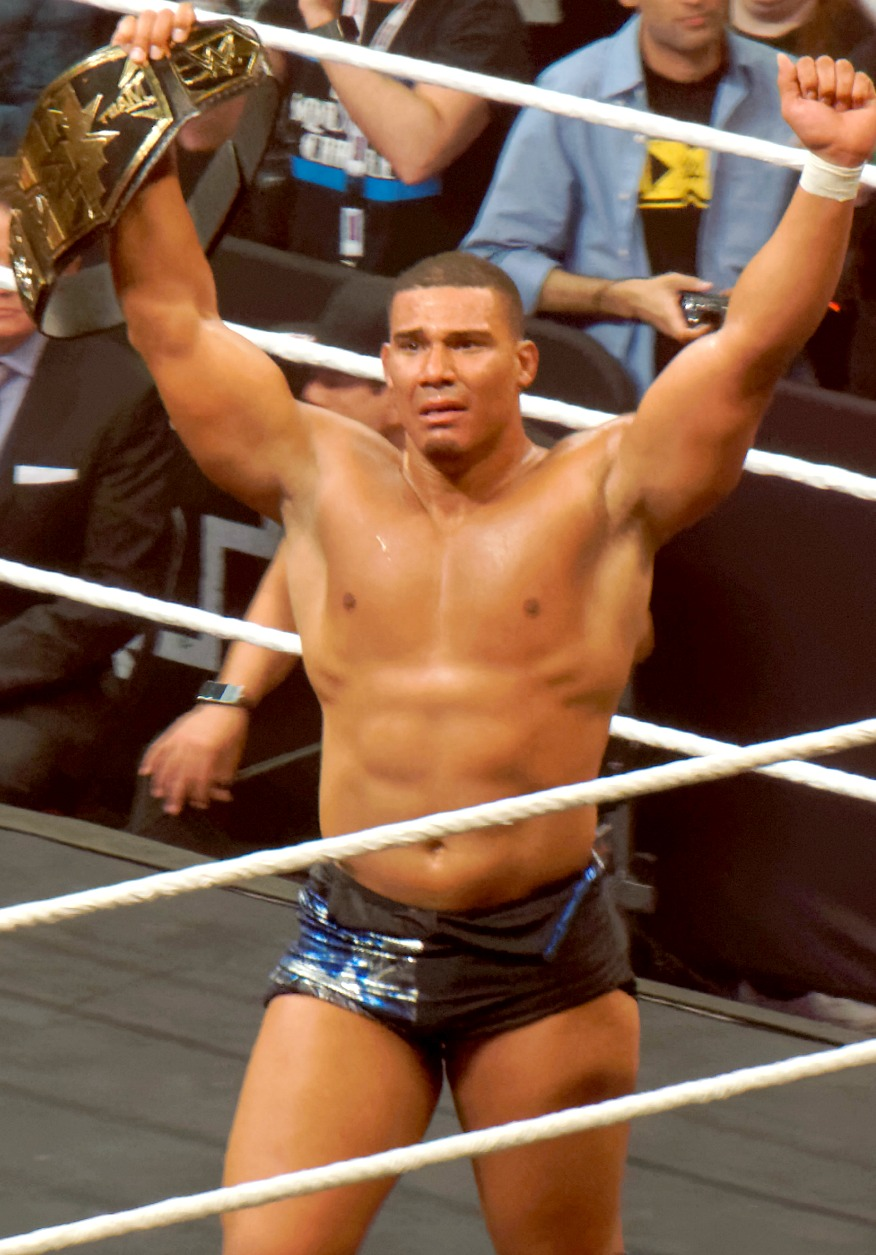
Jordan is a one–time NXT Tag Team Champion

- Florida Championship Wrestling
  - FCW Florida Tag Team Championship (1 time) – with CJ Parker
- Pro Wrestling Illustrated
  - Ranked No. 87 of the top 500 singles wrestlers in the PWI 500 in 2018
- WWE
  - NXT Tag Team Championship (1 time) – with Chad Gable
  - WWE Raw Tag Team Championship (1 time) – with Seth Rollins
  - WWE SmackDown Tag Team Championship (1 time) – with Chad Gable
