= Exodus Pro Wrestling =

American independent professional wrestling promotion

- Acronym: Exodus Pro
- Founded: July 17, 2023; 3 years ago
- Style: American professional wrestling
- Headquarters: Cleveland, Ohio, United States
- Founder: EC3
- Owner: EC3
- Formerly: NWA Exodus Pro Midwest
- Website: exoprowrestling.com

Exodus Pro Wrestling, formerly known as NWA Exodus Pro Midwest, is an American independent professional wrestling promotion, founded on July 17, 2023, by EC3. It served as the Midwestern territory of the National Wrestling Alliance (NWA) from 2023 to 2026.

== History ==
The logo used for Exodus Pro Wrestling as an NWA territory from 2023 to 2026

Following the conclusion of EC3's previous venture, Control Your Narrative (CYN), he announced the launch of Exodus Pro Wrestling (Exodus Pro), on July 17, 2023. On August 12, Exodus Pro held their first event Journey Home, which aired on the Premier Streaming Network. On October 9, following the announcement of the re-establishment of the National Wrestling Alliance (NWA) territorial system, Exodus Pro was revealed to be the NWA's first territory, being renamed NWA Exodus Pro Midwest in the process. The territory would still operate under the direction of EC3, who at the time was the NWA World's Heavyweight Champion.

On May 12, 2024, Exodus Pro crowned the inaugural NWA Exodus Pro Midwest Champion, when Pretty Boy Smooth defeated Brandon Day, Cristiano Argento, and Kal Herro in a fatal four-way elimination match. On August 24 at Midwest Journey II, Exodus Pro crowned their inaugural NWA Exodus Pro Midwest Tag Team Champions, when Major League (J-Rocc and Rex Brody) defeated TME (Duke Davis and Ganon Jones Jr.); at the same event, Tiffany Nieves defeated Kelsey Heather, Kylie Paige, and Maya World to become the territory's first Women's Champion.

== Championships ==
Championship	Current champion(s)	Reign	Date won	Days held	Location	Notes
Exodus Midwest Championship	Richard Holliday	1	December 6, 2025	36+	Cleveland, Ohio	Defeated Dante Casanova at NWA Exodus Pro Midwest Journ3y
Exodus Tag Team Championship	TME (Duke Davis & Ganon Jones Jr.)	1	November 16, 2024	680+	Cleveland, Ohio	Defeated Major League (J-Rocc & Rex Brody) at NWA Exodus Pro Midwest Usual Suspects
Exodus Women's Championship	Marti Belle	1	August 9, 2025	414+	Cleveland, Ohio	Defeated Tiffany Nieves at NWA Exodus Pro Midwest Journey II
