= Control Your Narrative =

Defunct American independent professional wrestling promotion

- Acronym: CYN
- Founded: 2021
- Defunct: 2022
- Style: Professional wrestling
- Headquarters: Orange County, Florida, United States
- Founder: Michael Hutter
- Owner: Michael Hutter
- Formerly: Free The Narrative

Control Your Narrative (CYN), formerly Free The Narrative, was an independent professional wrestling promotion based in Orange County, Florida. The promotion was founded in 2021 by Michael Hutter, better known by his ring name EC3.

== History ==
=== Early years (2021) ===
Following his departure from WWE in 2020, Michael Hutter reinvented his EC3 gimmick as a much darker and enigmatic crusader. Known as "The Essential Character", Hutter began to release a series of videos in which he expressed his desire to control the narrative. This led to a cinematic matche during Impact Wrestling's Bound for Glory pay-per-view on October 24, 2020 in which he lost to Moose. On April 15, 2021, Zack Ryder, who would later wrestle as Matt Cardona, was released from his WWE contract as part of a series of budget cuts from the promotion stemming from the COVID-19 pandemic. One day later, it was announced that EC3 would face Cardona during the Free The Narrative pay-per-view which would take place on May 27, 2021 in an undisclosed location. The event aired on a tape delay on FITE TV on July 3, 2021 with EC3 defeating Cardona. The event also featured talent from the independent circuit including Jake Logan, William Carr, and Parrow, All Elite Wrestling wrestler The Vision, and Impact Wrestling wrestler Moose. On September 1, 2021, Free The Narrative II was announced with Adam Scherr, formerly known as Braun Strowman, announcing that he will be having his first match since his release from WWE during the event. On September 24, 2021, EC3 announced that Free The Narrative II would air on FITE TV on October 2, 2021. The event was taped at an undisclosed location with the main event ending with Scherr defeating EC3.

=== Launch of Control Your Narrative (February–May 2022) ===
On February 7, 2022, EC3 and Adam Scherr announced the launch of the Control Your Narrative promotion with its first two live events being March 5, 2022 at the Tin Roof at Icon Park in Orlando, Florida and March 31, 2022 during WrestleMania 38 weekend at Gilley's Dallas in Dallas, Texas with the Dallas event airing as a television special titled The Awakening. On March 2, 2022, CYN announced that they had signed a TV deal with Pro Wrestling TV which would debut the following month. On March 7, 2022, ImagineAR, an augmented reality platform, announced that they had signed a multi-year deal to bring the promotion to the metaverse. On March 9, 2022, Adam Scherr had claimed that Major League Wrestling had attempted to convince Gilley's Dallas to cancel CYN's event at the venue due to the two promotions running the venue during the same weekend. On March 15, 2022, CYN announced the first four matches for the Awakening event in Dallas with the first four matches being Adam Scherr and EC3 vs. Redbeard and Damo, Austin Aries vs. Westin Blake, Flip Gordon vs. Dango, and Killer Kross vs. Vincent. Also announced on the card were Marina Shafir and Bateman. On March 22, 2022, CYN announced additional events on May 13, 2022 in Cleveland, Ohio at the Odeon Concert Club and May 14, 2022 in Detroit, Michigan at the Harpos Concert Theatre. On May 15, 2022, CYN teamed up with Great Lakes Championship Wrestling (GLCW) to present a cross-promotional event at Circle B in Cedarburg, Wisconsin which featured Adam Scherr, EC3, Dontae Smiley, and Flip Gordon taking on Backwoods Brown, Drew Hernandez, Ragnar The Ruthless, and TW3 in an eight-man tag team match as the main event.

=== Arise North America tour and hiatus (July 2022) ===
On July 11 2022, CYN announced that they would be going on a 24-date tour with shows in major markets such as New York City, Chicago, Illinois, Orlando, Florida, Philadelphia, Pennsylvania, Tampa, Florida, Atlanta, Georgia, and New Orleans, Louisiana which was set to begin on October 13, 2022 in San Antonio, Texas. However, on October 5, 2022, Adam Scherr was confirmed to have re-signed with WWE and made his return on the that night's episode of Monday Night Raw. On September 15, 2022, CYN announced that their tour had been cancelled. On February 11, 2023 during the Nuff Said pre-show it was announced that EC3 has officially signed to NWA and that he was bringing CYN with him. However, the promotion had been on hiatus after their final show on July 31, 2022 in Goldsboro, North Carolina. On July 17, 2023, EC3 announced the launch of CYN's successor promotion Exodus Pro Wrestling.
