= Braun Strowman =

American professional wrestler and strongman (born 1983)

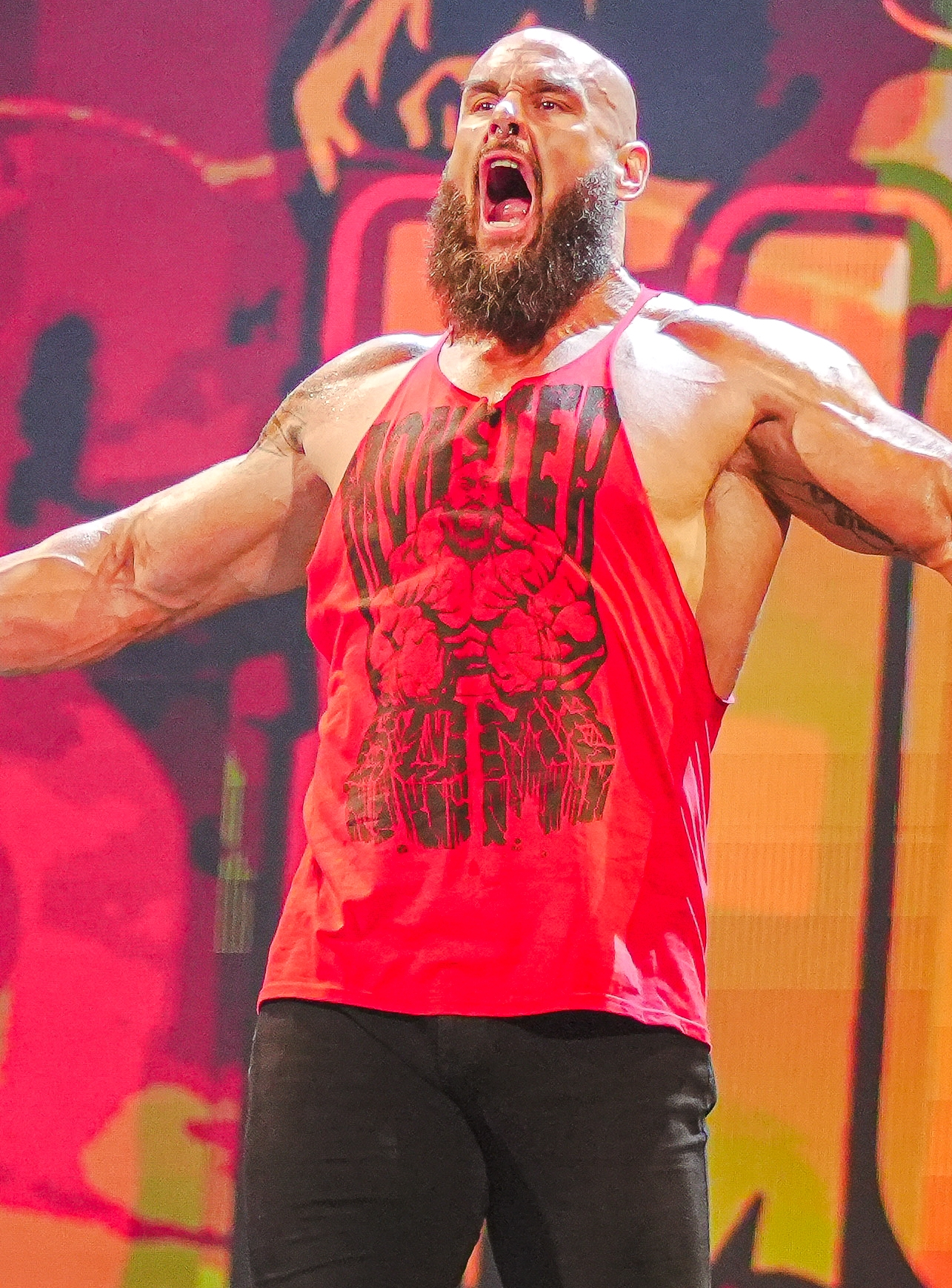
- Strowman in 2023

Personal information
- Born: Adam Joseph Scherr; September 6, 1983 (age 43) Sherrills Ford, North Carolina, U.S.

Professional wrestling career
- Ring name(s): Adam Scherr; Braun Strowman
- Billed height: 6 ft 8 in (203 cm)
- Billed weight: 335 lb (152 kg)
- Billed from: Sherills Ford, North Carolina
- Trained by: WWE Performance Center
- Debut: August 24, 2014

Adam Joseph Scherr (born September 6, 1983) is an American professional wrestler, strongman and actor. As a wrestler, he is best known for his tenures in WWE, where he performs under the ring name Braun Strowman.

Before professional wrestling, Scherr began his strongman career in 2010 when he won the NAS Amateur National Championships in 2011, and the Arnold Amateur Strongman Championships in 2012. After his retirement from strongman athletics, Scherr transitioned into professional wrestling and signed a contract with WWE in 2013; he wrestled on its NXT developmental brand under the name Braun Strowman. Upon debuting on the main roster in 2015, Strowman became part of The Wyatt Family.

Scherr has held the WWE Universal Championship and the WWE Intercontinental Championship once, and has headlined many pay-per-view events for WWE. He is tied with Shayna Baszler for the most eliminations in a single Elimination Chamber match with five, tied with Brock Lesnar for the most eliminations in a single Royal Rumble match with 13, holds the record for most eliminations in a single André the Giant Memorial Battle Royal with 14, and he is tied for the most eliminations in a single Survivor Series elimination match with four.

== Early life ==
Adam Scherr was born on September 6, 1983, in Sherrills Ford, North Carolina, near Charlotte, to Sara and Rick "Crusher" Scherr. His father is widely regarded as one of the greatest slow-pitch softball players of all time, and is a USSSA Hall of Fame member who still holds the All Time World Series records in home runs (101), hits (166), and RBI (202). Scherr has a younger sister named Hannah. Growing up, he spent time in Arkansas and Tennessee. He attended Bandys High School, where he was on the football, track and field, and wrestling teams. He went through a significant growth spurt in high school; he was 5 ft 8 in (1.73 m) during his freshman year and grew to 6 ft 5 in (1.96 m) by the time he graduated. After graduating in 2001, he "goofed off" until 2003, when he enrolled in a community college. He spent the next four years playing football semi-professionally for the Hickory Hornets, supplementing his income by working as a doorman and mechanic. Scherr attended the NFL Scouting Combine in 2007, but he ultimately did not turn professional. In the late 2000s, he began competing in amateur strongman competitions.

== Strongman career ==
Competition record

Strongman

Representing United States

Arnold Strongman Classic
10th	2013

Arnold Amateur Strongman Championships
1st	2012

Giants Live
7th	2012 Poland

Central GA Strongest Man
1st	2011

Europa Battle of Champions
1st	2010

Monster of the Midland
1st	2010

NAS US Amateur National Championships
1st	2011

Summerfest Strongman
1st	2011

West Cary Fall Festival of Power
1st	2011

Scherr earned his Strongman Corporation (ASC) Professional Card by winning the NAS Amateur National Championships on November 5, 2011. He won the 2012 Arnold Amateur Strongman Championships on March 4, which took place during the Arnold Sports Festival alongside the 2012 Arnold Strongman Classic. This victory earned Scherr an invite to the 2013 Arnold Strongman Classic. He competed in the SCL North American Championships on July 8, 2012, finishing in 5th place overall as well as competing in the Giants Live Poland event on July 21, finishing in 7th place overall and earned his nickname "The Straw Man".

== Professional wrestling career ==
=== WWE (2013–2021) ===
==== Training (2013–2015) ====
Scherr signed a contract with the professional wrestling promotion WWE in early 2013 and was assigned to the WWE Performance Center in Orlando, Florida, where he adopted the ring name Braun Strowman (with the first name a reference to Milwaukee Brewers left fielder Ryan Braun, and the last name a tweaked version of a nickname he earned during his Strongman career, "The Straw Man"). In 2014, he made appearances as one of Adam Rose's "Rosebuds" in his Exotic Express gimmick. He made his professional wrestling debut at an NXT live event in Jacksonville, Florida on December 19, 2014, defeating Chad Gable. On June 2, 2015, Strowman appeared at a Main Event taping in a dark match, where he defeated an unidentified wrestler.

==== The Wyatt Family (2015–2016) ====
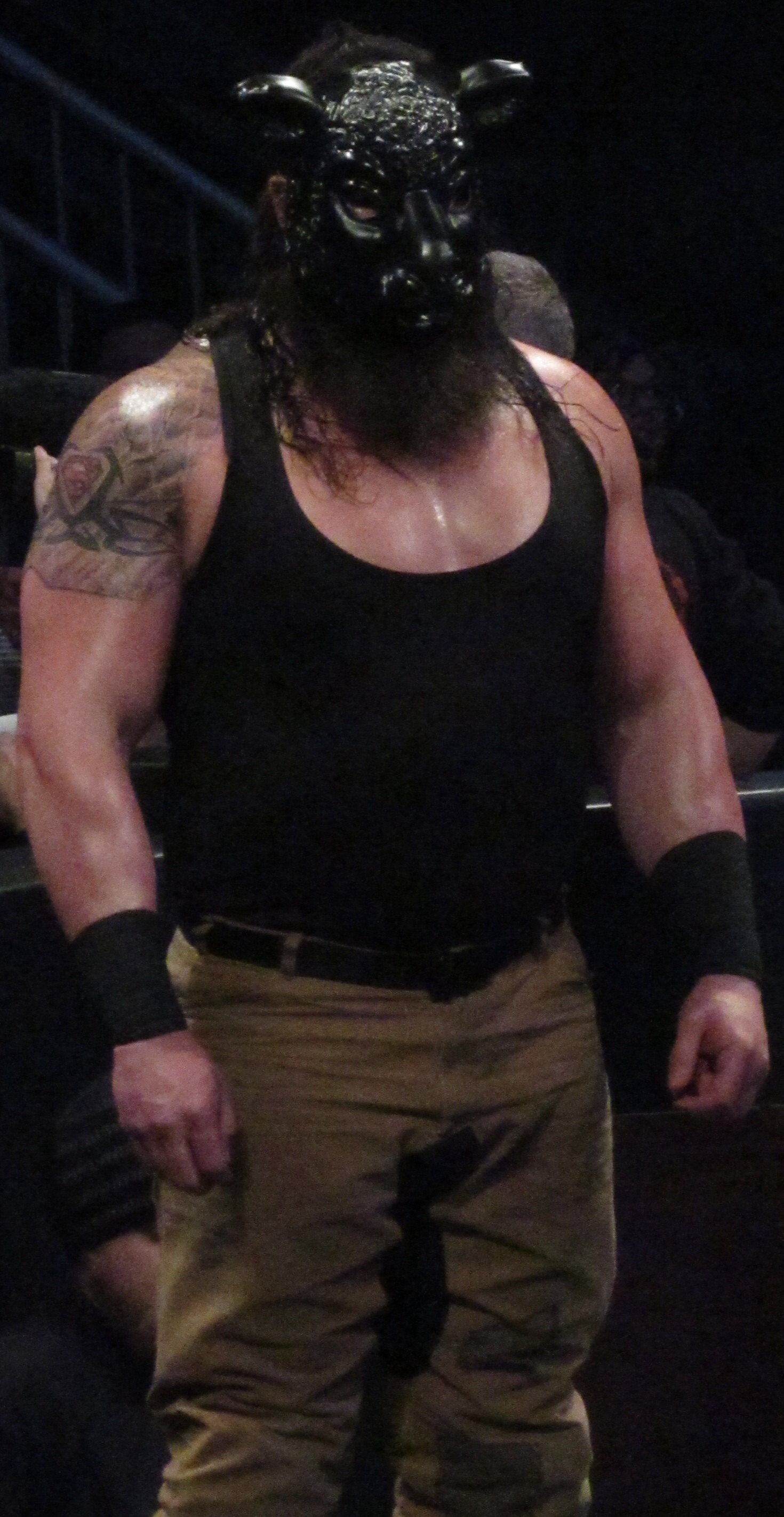
Strowman (Performing the Black sheep) as part of The Wyatt Family in January 2016

On the August 24 episode of Raw, Strowman made his main roster debut as a heel by attacking Dean Ambrose and Roman Reigns and establishing himself as the newest member of The Wyatt Family alongside Bray Wyatt, Luke Harper and Erick Rowan. Strowman had his first televised singles match on the August 31 episode of Raw, defeating Ambrose by disqualification. Strowman wrestled in his first WWE pay-per-view event match on September 20 at Night of Champions, where The Wyatt Family defeated Ambrose, Reigns and Chris Jericho in a six-man tag team match after Jericho passed out to Strowman's lifting arm triangle choke. On December 13 at TLC: Tables, Ladders & Chairs, The Wyatt Family defeated The ECW Originals (Bubba Ray Dudley and D-Von Dudley (collectively known as The Dudley Boyz), Rhyno and Tommy Dreamer) in an eight-man tag team elimination tables match.

On January 24, 2016, Strowman appeared at the Royal Rumble and scored among the most eliminations in the Royal Rumble match for the WWE World Heavyweight Championship, eliminating five opponents before being eliminated by Brock Lesnar, only to return to the match and help his fellow Wyatt Family members eliminate Lesnar. At Fastlane on February 21, The Wyatt Family lost to Big Show, Kane and Ryback, but got their win back in a rematch the next night on Raw. On April 3 at WrestleMania 32, he appeared during The Rock and John Cena's confrontation with The Wyatt Family, suffering a Rock Bottom after being volleyed back and forth between Cena and Rock in the process. The Wyatt Family were originally scheduled to face The League of Nations on May 1 at Payback, but the match was canceled after Wyatt suffered a legitimate injury. The Wyatt Family soon began a feud with the WWE Tag Team Champions The New Day, defeating them in a six-man tag team match on July 24 at Battleground.

==== Singles competition (2016–2018) ====
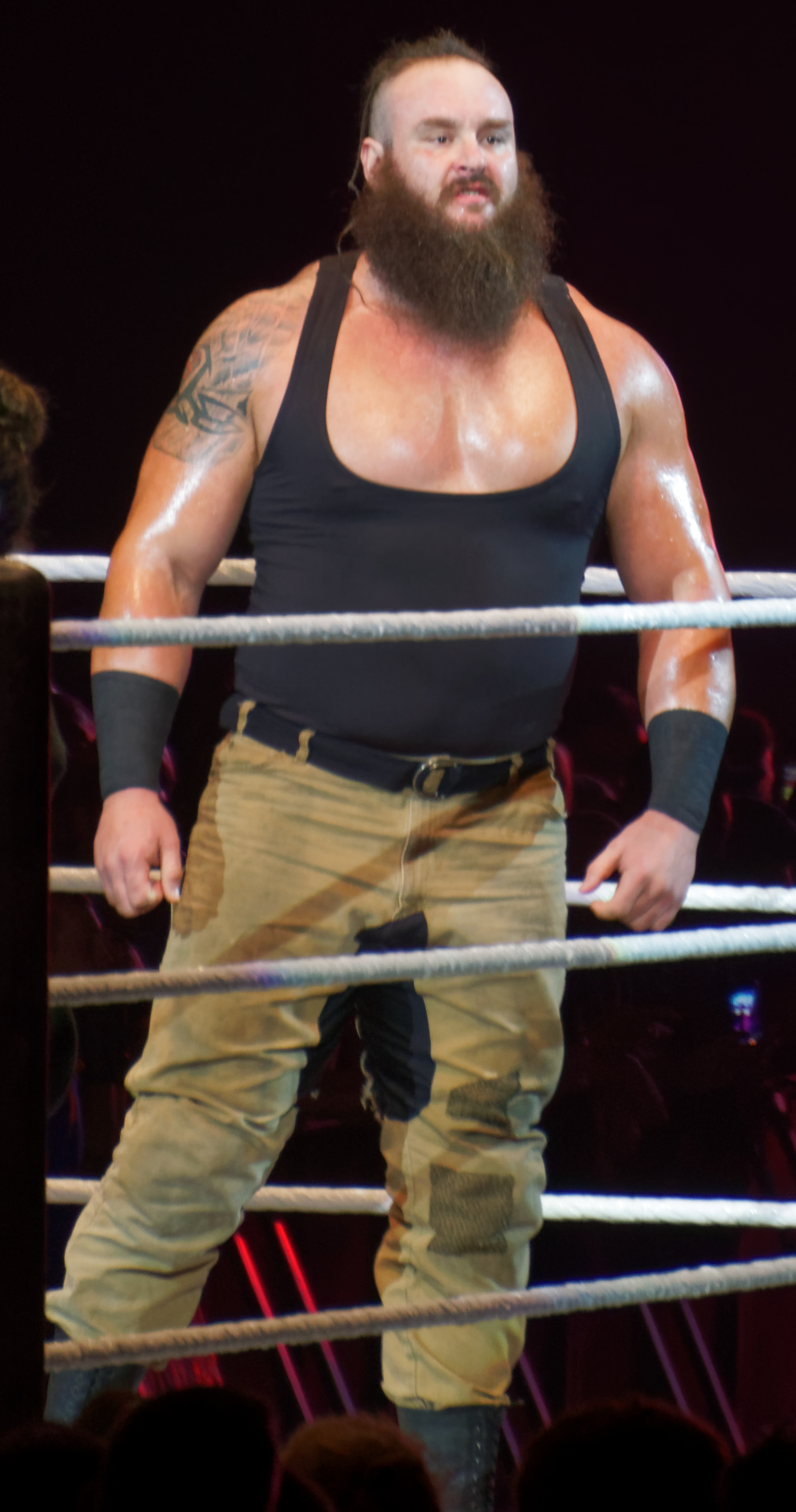
Strowman in September 2016

As part of the 2016 WWE draft, Strowman was drafted to the Raw brand while Wyatt and Rowan were drafted to SmackDown instead, separating himself from The Wyatt Family and beginning his singles career. Over the following weeks on Raw, Strowman modified his appearance and defeated James Ellsworth and several other local wrestlers who put up no challenge. On the September 5 episode of Raw, Sin Cara challenged Strowman due to him disrespecting luchadores; Strowman defeated Sin Cara by countout and by pinfall in the following weeks. On the October 17 episode of Raw, Strowman was confronted by Sami Zayn after easily defeating three local competitors in a one-on-three handicap match. Strowman was scheduled to compete against Zayn the following week on Raw, but the match never started as both men attacked each other before the bell rang. On the October 31 episode of Raw, Strowman won a battle royal by last eliminating Zayn for a spot on Team Raw for the traditional Survivor Series five-on-five elimination match. At the event on November 20, Strowman eliminated Dean Ambrose, but was the first man to be eliminated from Team Raw after being counted out due to interference by James Ellsworth, who was put through a table after being chased up the entrance ramp by Strowman. Team Raw lost the match. On the December 12 episode of Raw, Raw general manager Mick Foley announced a match between Strowman and Zayn for Roadblock: End of the Line on December 18, being announced as a ten-minute time limit match in which Strowman had ten minutes to defeat Zayn, which Strowman was unable to do. The following night on Raw, Strowman demanded a match against Zayn, but Foley had given Zayn the night off which prompted Strowman to attack Sin Cara and Titus O'Neil during their match and later attacked Seth Rollins and Roman Reigns during their match against Chris Jericho and Kevin Owens. Strowman defeated Zayn in a Last Man Standing match on the January 2, 2017 episode of Raw to end their feud.

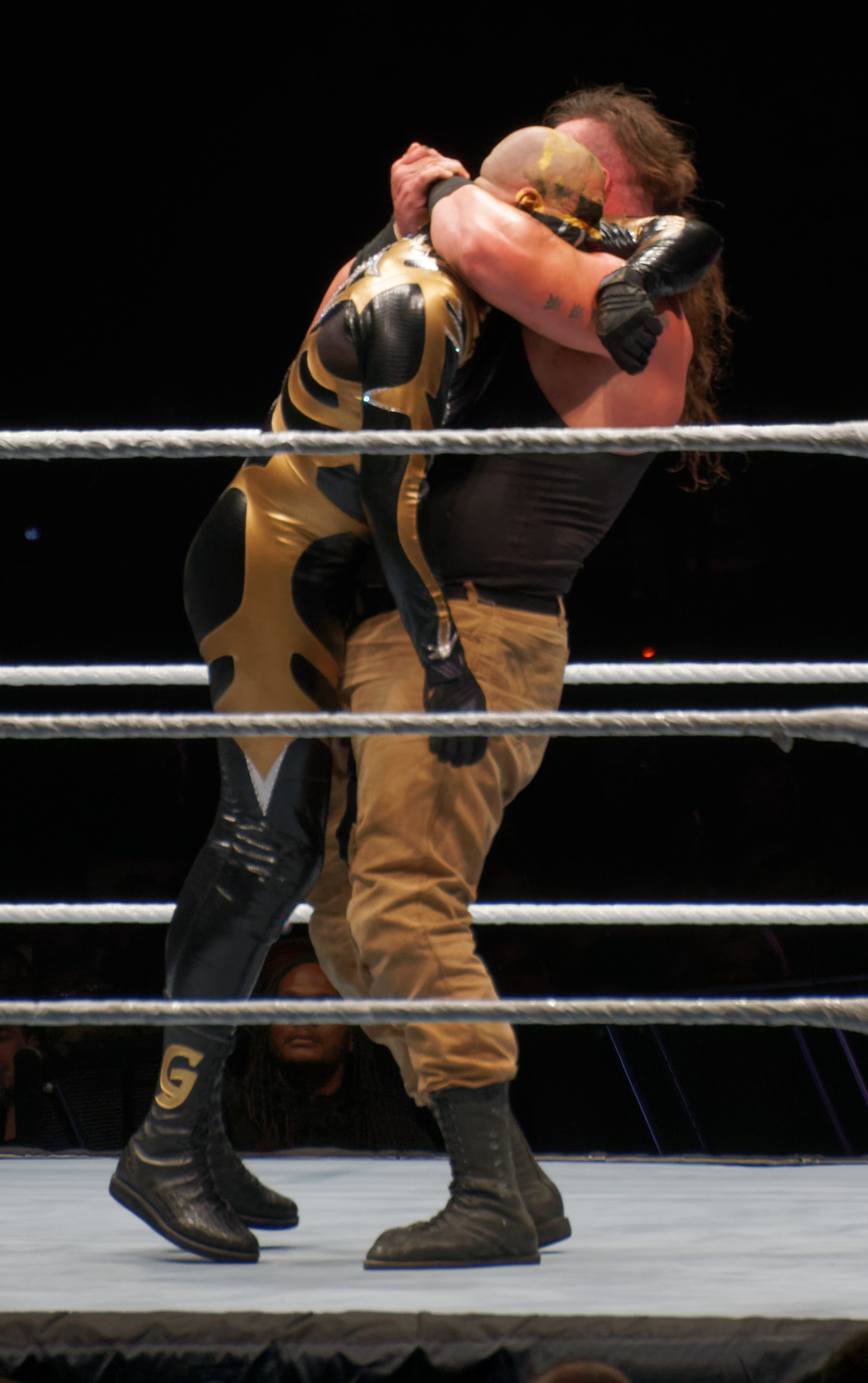
Strowman applying a lifting arm triangle choke on Goldust in 2016

On January 27 at the Royal Rumble, Strowman interfered during Kevin Owens and Roman Reigns' title match, helping Owens retain the Universal Championship. Later that night, Strowman entered the Royal Rumble match at #7, eliminating Mojo Rawley, Big Cass, Kalisto, Mark Henry, Big Show, James Ellsworth and Tye Dillinger before being eliminated by Baron Corbin. On the January 30 episode of Raw, Strowman challenged for his first world championship when he took on Kevin Owens for the Universal Championship as he was granted the match by Foley after video proof of Owens promising Strowman a title match, which Strowman won by disqualification after Reigns interfered and attacked him. Strowman then continued to demand better competition, easily defeating four local competitors and then being granted a match with Reigns at Fastlane who also had attacked him in his match against Samoa Joe, causing Joe to win. At the event on March 5, Strowman lost to Reigns, marking his first loss by pinfall. At WrestleMania 33 on April 2, Strowman competed in the André the Giant Memorial Battle Royal, which was won by Mojo Rawley.

On the April 10 episode of Raw, Strowman continued his feud with Reigns, attacking him and kayfabe injuring his shoulder. Despite playing a villain, Strowman received a very positive fan response, partially due to the negative fan reaction of Reigns. At Payback on April 30, Strowman defeated Reigns. During a match against Big Show on the April 17 episode of Raw, Strowman performed a superplex on Big Show off the ropes, causing the ring to implode and collapse; the match subsequently ended in a no contest. After the May 8 episode of Raw, WWE claimed that Strowman had a legitimate injury with a shattered elbow and would therefore be sidelined for about six months. This also caused a change in the schedule, with the planned match between him and Brock Lesnar at Great Balls of Fire having to be scrapped. Strowman underwent surgery three days later on May 11. However, Dave Meltzer of the Wrestling Observer Newsletter reported that while Strowman's elbow injury was indeed legitimate, it was minor, scheduled to sideline him for only two months, with WWE exaggerating it in order for him to make a surprise return "four months early". On the June 19 episode of Raw, Strowman returned from injury, attacking Roman Reigns. This led to an ambulance match at Great Balls of Fire on July 9, which Strowman won. At SummerSlam on August 20, Strowman challenged for Lesnar's Universal Championship in a fatal-four-way match also involving Reigns and Samoa Joe in a losing effort. Strowman faced Lesnar for the championship at No Mercy on September 24, but was unsuccessful once again.

Strowman later became involved in The Miz's feud with the reformed stable The Shield, leading to a five-on-three handicap TLC match at TLC: Tables, Ladders & Chairs on October 22, where he, Miz, Cesaro and Sheamus, and Kane faced Dean Ambrose, Seth Rollins and Kurt Angle. (Note: Kurt Angle replaced Roman Reigns, who was unable to compete due to an illness concern.) During the match, Strowman's teammates turned on him by throwing him into the back of a garbage truck, turning Strowman face in the process. His team lost the match. Strowman returned to Raw the following week, attacking Miz and The Miztourage (Curtis Axel and Bo Dallas). At Survivor Series on November 19, Strowman was a part of Team Raw, defeating Team SmackDown as Strowman and Triple H were the sole survivors of the team. On the December 11 episode of Raw, Strowman fought Kane to a double countout in a match to determine the #1 contender to the Universal Championship on January 28, 2018, at the Royal Rumble, leading to the match being changed to a triple threat match involving also Kane and Lesnar. At the Royal Rumble, Strowman failed to win the title. The next night on Raw, Strowman defeated Kane in Last Man Standing match to qualify for the Elimination Chamber match at the titular pay-per-view to determine the #1 contender for the Universal Championship. At Elimination Chamber on February 25, Strowman eliminated The Miz, Elias, John Cena, Finn Bálor and Seth Rollins (setting the new record for the most eliminations in a single Elimination Chamber match), but was the last man eliminated by Roman Reigns.

==== World championship pursuits (2018–2019) ====
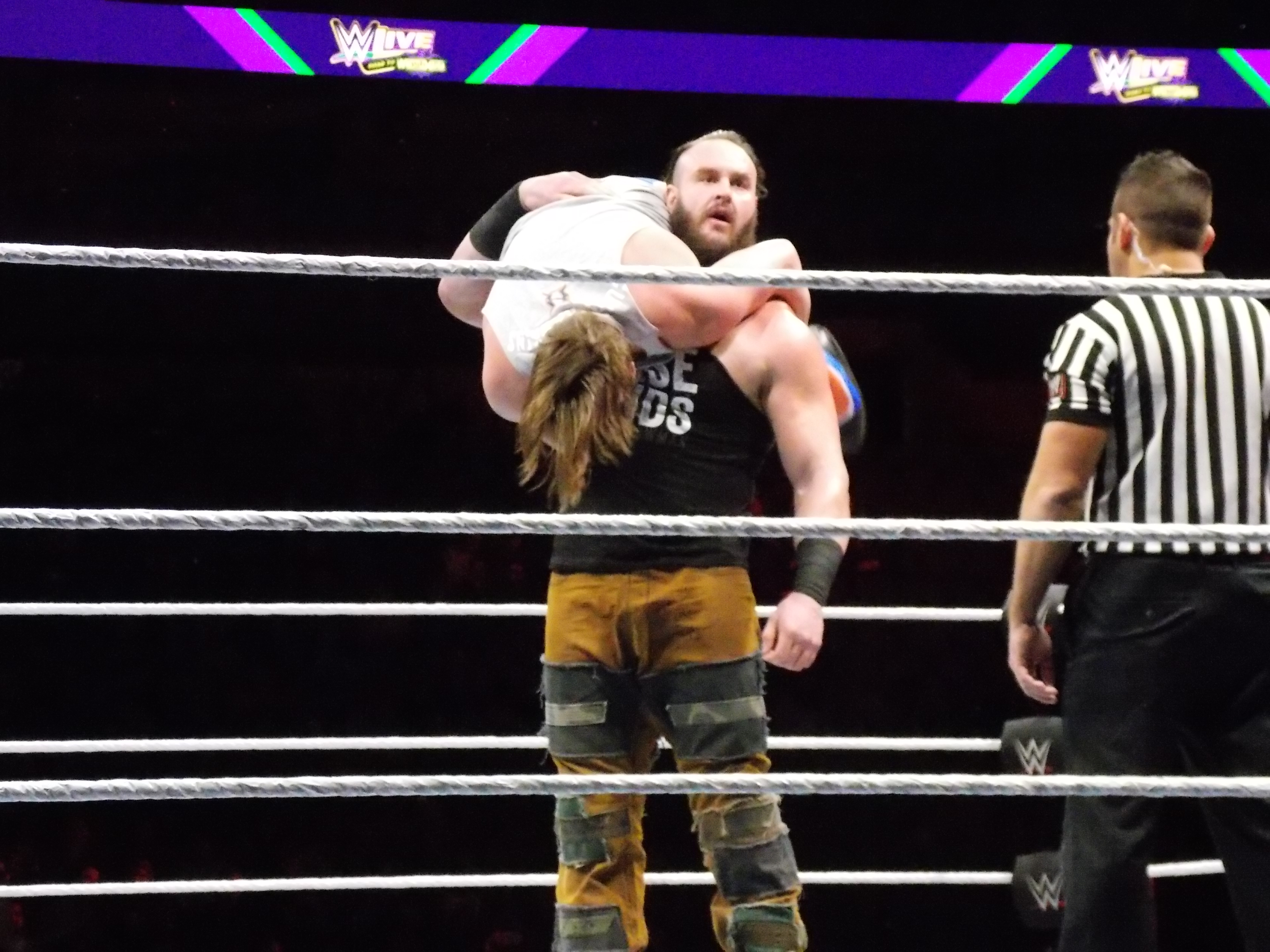
Strowman performing the Running Powerslam on Curt Hawkins in February 2018

On the March 12 episode of Raw, Strowman, despite lacking a partner, won a tag team battle royal to determine the #1 contenders for the Raw Tag Team Championship at WrestleMania 34. Raw general manager Kurt Angle allowed Strowman to challenge for the titles, under the provision he choose a partner at WrestleMania. At WrestleMania on April 8, Strowman chose a young fan in attendance named Nicholas to be his partner (in reality, son of referee John Cone). The duo defeated champions Cesaro and Sheamus, winning his first championship in WWE and making Nicholas the youngest champion of any kind in WWE history. The following night on Raw, Strowman and Nicholas relinquished the titles due to Nicholas' "scheduling conflict" (school). On April 27 at the Greatest Royal Rumble in Jeddah, Saudi Arabia, Strowman won the namesake match and in doing so broke the record for most eliminations in a Royal Rumble match with 13, beating Roman Reigns' previous record of 12. Strowman then entered into a feud with Kevin Owens. He and Bobby Lashley defeated Kevin Owens and Sami Zayn at Backlash on May 6, and won the Money in the Bank ladder match at the namesake pay-per-view on June 17. At Extreme Rules on July 15, Owens defeated Strowman in a steel cage match after Strowman performed a chokeslam off the cage through an announce table on Owens, giving Owens the win as his feet touched the floor first per the rules. At SummerSlam on August 19, Strowman defeated Owens with his Money in the Bank contract on the line in two minutes, ending their feud. Later that same night, Strowman announced he would be cashing in on the winner of the main event and challenging them after the match. However, then-reigning Universal Champion Brock Lesnar attacked Strowman during his match with Roman Reigns, leaving Strowman unable to cash in when Reigns won the title after pinning Lesnar.

Strowman attempted another cash-in on Reigns the next night on Raw, but was stopped by The Shield, who attacked Strowman before the match became official. Strowman formed an alliance with Dolph Ziggler and Drew McIntyre by helping them attack The Shield, turning heel. At Hell in a Cell on September 16, Strowman cashed in his Money in the Bank briefcase on Reigns, but due to interference from Brock Lesnar, the match ended in a no contest. At Super Show-Down on October 6, Strowman, Ziggler and McIntyre lost to The Shield, but defeated them two days later on Raw. On the October 15 episode of Raw, Strowman, Ziggler and McIntyre lost to The Shield again after McIntyre accidentally kicked Strowman during the match. Afterwards, Strowman powerslammed Ziggler before being attacked by McIntyre, dissolving their partnership and turning face again. At Crown Jewel on November 2, Strowman lost to Lesnar after a pre-match attack by Raw general manager Baron Corbin and five F-5s, in which Strowman kicked out of four F-5s. On November 18 at Survivor Series, Strowman was again attacked by Corbin, along with McIntyre and Bobby Lashley, after Team Raw defeated Team SmackDown in the traditional tag team elimination match. The following night on Raw, Strowman was again attacked by Corbin, Lashley and McIntyre, which was used to write him off television, as WWE revealed that Strowman was suffering a legit elbow injury, which would require surgery. Strowman returned at TLC on December 16, defeating Corbin in a Tables, Ladders, and Chairs match to earn a Universal Championship match against Brock Lesnar at the Royal Rumble and Corbin was stripped of all authoritative power. On the January 14, 2019 episode of Raw, he was removed from the Universal Championship match after damaging Vince McMahon's limo after chasing Baron Corbin, and refusing to pay for the damages. However, he instead participated in the Royal Rumble match on January 27, replacing John Cena, who wasn't medically cleared to compete. He was the last man eliminated by eventual winner Seth Rollins. Strowman continued his feud with Corbin, leading to a no-disqualification match at Elimination Chamber on February 17, which Strowman lost after interference from McIntyre and Lashley. The following night on Raw, Strowman defeated Corbin in a tables match, ending their feud.

Strowman was then involved in a storyline with Colin Jost and Michael Che of Saturday Night Live (SNL) fame. On the March 4 episode of Raw, the SNL duo appeared and were announced as special correspondents for WrestleMania 35; in a backstage segment later that night, Jost questioned the legitimacy of professional wrestling, resulting in Strowman attacking him. On the March 18 episode of Raw, Strowman announced his participation in the André the Giant Memorial Battle Royal. He challenged the duo to also enter the battle royal, which was made official by WrestleMania 35 host Alexa Bliss. The match, which took place on the kickoff show on April 7, saw Strowman emerge victorious after last eliminating Jost. Strowman broke another record, of most eliminations in that particular match as well with 14 eliminations overall. On the April 29 episode of Raw, Strowman was announced as one of the entrants in the Money in the Bank ladder match at the titular event on May 19. However, on the May 13 episode of Raw, Strowman lost to Sami Zayn, who had the help of Corbin and McIntrye, forfeiting his spot in the match to Zayn in the process. On the June 3 episode of Raw, Strowman defeated Bobby Lashley in an arm wrestling match, but was then attacked by Lashley, setting up a match at Super ShowDown on June 7 which Strowman also won. On the July 1 episode of Raw, Strowman faced Lashley in a Falls Count Anywhere match which ended in a no contest after Strowman crashed Lashley through the LED boards on the stage where Strowman suffered a kayfabe ruptured spleen. Strowman defeated Lashley in a Last Man Standing match at Extreme Rules on July 14 to end the feud.

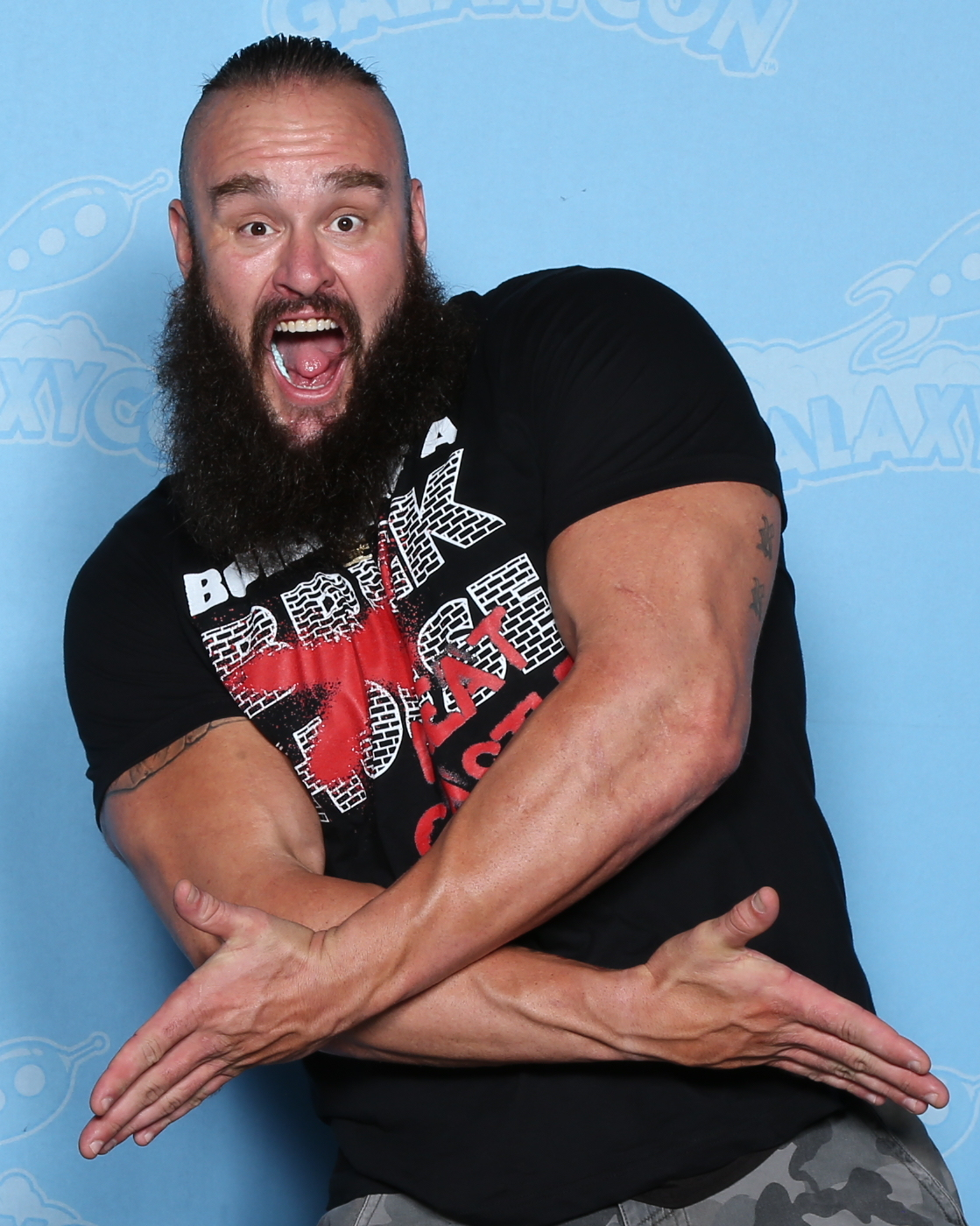
Strowman in July 2019

In August, Strowman entered into a storyline with Universal Champion Seth Rollins after saving Rollins from an attack by The O.C. (AJ Styles, Luke Gallows and Karl Anderson). Strowman and Rollins defeated Gallows and Anderson to win the Raw Tag Team Championship on the August 19 episode of Raw. A Universal Championship match between Strowman and Rollins was subsequently arranged for Clash of Champions, with the duo also having to defend the tag titles against Dolph Ziggler and Robert Roode at the event. At the event on September 15, Strowman and Rollins lost the tag titles to Ziggler and Roode in the opening match, and in the main event, Strowman lost to Rollins. Strowman then started an on-air feud with boxer Tyson Fury. This led to a brawl on October 7 episode of Raw, due to neither man wanting to offer an apology. Strowman lost to Fury at Crown Jewel on October 31 after he was counted out, and after the match, Strowman laid out Fury with a Running Powerslam to end their feud.

==== Championship reigns (2019–2020) ====
As part of the 2019 draft, Strowman was drafted to the SmackDown brand. At Survivor Series on November 24, Strowman was a part of Team SmackDown in the 5-on-5-on-5 Survivor Series match between Team Raw, Team SmackDown and Team NXT, which Strowman's team won. At Royal Rumble on January 26, 2020, Strowman entered at #14, but failed to win the match. On the January 31 episode of SmackDown, despite interferences from Sami Zayn and Cesaro, Strowman defeated Shinsuke Nakamura to win the Intercontinental Championship for the first time in his career, marking his first singles title in WWE. However, at Elimination Chamber on March 8, Strowman lost the title to Sami Zayn in a 3-on-1 handicap match also involving Nakamura and Cesaro; in which Zayn pinned Strowman.

In April, it was announced that Strowman would replace Roman Reigns at WrestleMania 36, facing Goldberg for the Universal Championship, after Reigns opted to pull out of the event amid concerns surrounding the COVID-19 pandemic that had already affected the pay-per-view. On the first night of WrestleMania on April 4, Strowman returned after a month-long hiatus and defeated Goldberg to win the Universal Championship, his first world championship. He then began a feud with Bray Wyatt, leading to a title match at Money in the Bank on May 10, which Strowman won. After retaining the title against John Morrison and The Miz at Backlash on June 14, Strowman rekindled his rivalry with Wyatt, who challenged him to a non-title "Wyatt Swamp Fight" on the June 26 episode of SmackDown, which Strowman accepted. At The Horror Show at Extreme Rules on July 19, Strowman lost the "cinematic-style" match after being dragged down into a lake by Wyatt, who used multiple illusions in the match. On the August 14 episode of SmackDown, Strowman, now sporting a shaved head, acted more sinister as he showed no compassion towards Alexa Bliss and physically attacked her with a gorilla press, turning heel for the first time since 2018. At SummerSlam on August 23, Strowman lost the Universal Championship to Wyatt in a Falls Count Anywhere match, ending his reign at 141 days, after which both he and Wyatt were attacked by a returning Roman Reigns. At Payback on August 30, Strowman failed to win back the title after he was pinned by Reigns.

==== Last feuds before initial departure (2020–2021) ====
As part of the 2020 Draft in October, Strowman was drafted to the Raw brand. At Survivor Series on November 22, Strowman was a part of Team Raw, who defeated Team SmackDown in a clean sweep. At Royal Rumble on January 31, 2021, he entered at #30, eliminating Sheamus, Cesaro, and AJ Styles but was eliminated by eventual winner Edge.

On the March 1 episode of Raw, Strowman would team with WWE official Adam Pearce and face the Raw Tag Team Champions The Hurt Business but they were unsuccessful after Shane McMahon would get up on the ring apron and force Strowman to tag Pearce in, causing Benjamin to roll up Pearce and get the win. The next week, Strowman would demand an explanation and apology from Shane McMahon. However, McMahon would instead play a prank on Strowman by mocking him and pretending to flee the arena, before calling him "stupid" behind his back, thus turning Strowman face. McMahon was scheduled to face Strowman at Fastlane, but McMahon would suffer a left knee injury preparing for the match, instead having Elias take his place in the match; Strowman defeated Elias nevertheless. At WrestleMania 37, Strowman defeated McMahon in a steel cage match.

On the Raw after WrestleMania, Strowman faced Drew McIntyre and Randy Orton in a triple threat match for a WWE Championship match at WrestleMania Backlash but failed to win after McIntyre pinned Orton. On the April 26 episode of Raw, Strowman defeated McIntyre to gain entry into the WWE Championship match following interference from Mace and T-Bar. At WrestleMania Backlash, Strowman failed to win the title from Bobby Lashley in a triple threat match also involving McIntyre. This would turn out to be his final match for the company as he was released on June 2, 2021.

=== Control Your Narrative and Ring of Honor (2021–2022) ===
Scherr debuted at Free The Narrative 2: The Monsters In Us All, defeating the show's creator EC3. In January 2022, it was announced that Scherr would team with the former Erick Rowan (now Erick Redbeard) in a match against Bully Ray & nZo, which took place at Northeast Wrestling's WrestleFest XXVI on January 22, with Scherr and Redbeard winning the match. It marked the first time Scherr and Redbeard had teamed together in five years.

Scherr debuted at the ROH pay-per-view Final Battle on December 11, 2021, where he, EC3 & Westin Blake formed the new Control Your Narrative stable and attacked Eli Isom, Dak Draper and Brian Johnson. On February 17, 2022, Scherr along with fellow professional wrestler EC3, revealed the formation of their own wrestling promotion, Control Your Narrative (CYN). The company started tapings for their impending TV deal in March; taking inspiration from Fight Club, the promotion featured talent booking their own storylines in a way that resembles the early stages of Fight Club's "Project: Mayhem".

=== Return to WWE (2022–2025) ===
On September 1, 2022, Scherr was reported to have re-signed with WWE. On the September 5 show of Raw, Braun Strowman returned to WWE and attacked every competitor in a fatal four-way tag team match. On the October 14 show of SmackDown, Strowman was confronted by Omos, starting a feud between the two. At Crown Jewel on November 5, Strowman defeated Omos. Strowman entered into the SmackDown World Cup with the winner earning an eventual Intercontinental Championship match against Gunther. He defeated Jinder Mahal in the first round before losing to Ricochet in the semifinals after interference from Imperium. Strowman formed an alliance with Ricochet and feuded with Imperium, where Strowman and Ricochet emerged victorious against them in a Miracle on 34th Street Fight on the Christmas Eve edition of SmackDown. Strowman challenged Gunther for the Intercontinental Championship on the January 13, 2023 show of SmackDown, where Strowman lost.

In the 2023 WWE Draft, Strowman was drafted to the Raw brand. He went on hiatus soon thereafter due to undergoing neck surgery, but he made a brief return during the opening segment on the August 25 show of SmackDown which was a segment to honour his friend Bray Wyatt, who died due to a heart attack the previous day. Strowman returned from injury on the April 29, 2024 episode of Raw. In mid-2024, Strowman feuded with 'Big' Bronson Reed, in which they destroyed a variety of WWE property (including cars, backstage equipment and more), eventually culminating in a Last Monster Standing match on September 30. Strowman won after Seth 'Freakin' Rollins performed The Stomp on Reed, allowing Strowman to get to his feet. During the match, Strowman suffered a torn groin injury, putting him out of action for some time. Strowman then returned from injury on the December 13 episode of SmackDown, where he moved to the SmackDown brand and defeated Carmelo Hayes. On the December 20 episode of SmackDown, Strowman became a guest on The Grayson Waller Effect with A-Town Down Under's Grayson Waller and Austin Theory, until Carmelo Hayes interrupted the interview session, culminating in a match between Strowman and Hayes, which Strowman lost via count-out. Around this time, Strowman began a feud with Jacob Fatu along with his fellow members of The Bloodline, Solo Sikoa and Tama Tonga. At Saturday Night's Main Event XXXVIII on January 25, 2025, Strowman faced off against Fatu in a match, where Strowman won by disqualification after Fatu shoved the referee. At the Royal Rumble on February 1, Strowman eliminated Fatu before being eliminated by John Cena. On the April 4 episode of SmackDown, Strowman faced off against Fatu in a Last man standing match to determine the number one contender for the WWE United States Championship at WrestleMania 41 held by LA Knight, at which Strowman would lose in what would be his final full-time WWE match.

On May 3, 2025, WWE informed Scherr that his full-time performer's contract would expire on July 31. While Scherr's release from his contract was due to a higher salary, according to Bill Apter, WWE considered bringing Scherr back in a part-time capacity between six months to a year despite wrestling with his left leg 15% paralysed throughout his second tenure. Despite no longer being an active wrestler, Scherr would continue to appear in WWE produced programs, hosting the WWE Studios show Everything on the Menu with Braun Strowman, which premiered on October 24, 2025.

== Personal life ==
Scherr supports the Green Bay Packers. He is the godfather of Bray Wyatt and JoJo Offerman's son.

He was formerly in a relationship with Raquel Rodriguez. They became friends and eventually dated after having met at a gym in 2019. He also dated fellow professional wrestler Kamille.

== Other media ==
From October 2025, Scherr began hosting his own food travel show titled Everything on the Menu with Braun Strowman for USA Network. In January 2026, USA Network announced the show had been renewed for a second season.

=== Filmography ===
==== Film ====
Year	Title	Role
2016	Three Count	Strongman
2018	Holmes & Watson	Brawn
2025	Deathgasm II: Goremageddon	Security Guard

==== Television ====
Year	Title	Role	Notes
2012	The World's Strongest Man	Himself	Episode: "The Qualifiers: Kartuzy, Poland"
2018	Dus Ka Dum	Himself	
2020	Ryan's Mystery Playdate	Himself	Episode: "Ryan's Pinned Playdate"
2023	Destination Polaris	Himself	Episode: "Wisconsin"
2025–present	Everything on the Menu with Braun Strowman	Himself	Host
2026	Hell's Kitchen	Himself	Episode: "Battle for Black Jackets"

=== Video games ===
Year	Title	Ref.
2016	WWE 2K17	
2017	WWE 2K18	
2018	WWE 2K19	
2019	WWE 2K20	
2020	WWE 2K Battlegrounds	
2022	WWE 2K22	
2023	WWE 2K23	
2024	WWE 2K24	
2025	WWE 2K25	

== Championships and accomplishments ==
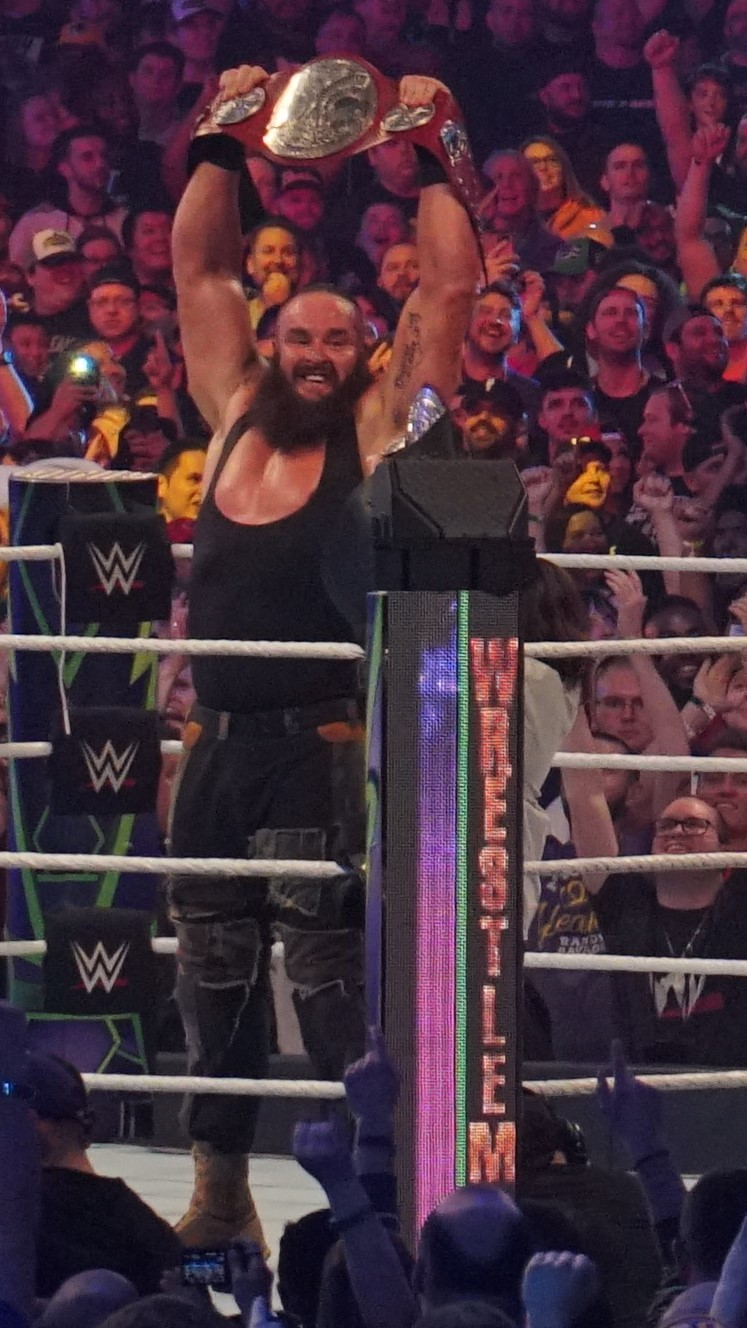
Strowman is a two-time Raw Tag Team Champion.

=== Professional wrestling ===
- Pro Wrestling Illustrated
  - Ranked No. 6 of the top 500 singles wrestlers in the PWI 500 in 2018
- Sports Illustrated
  - Ranked No. 5 of the top 10 wrestlers in 2017
- Wrestling Observer Newsletter
  - Most Improved (2017)
  - Worst Feud of the Year (2020) vs. Bray Wyatt
  - Worst Match of the Year (2020) vs. Bray Wyatt at The Horror Show at Extreme Rules
- WWE
  - WWE Universal Championship (1 time)
  - WWE Intercontinental Championship (1 time)
  - WWE Raw Tag Team Championship (2 times) – with Nicholas (1) and Seth Rollins (1)
  - Men's Money in the Bank (2018)
  - André the Giant Memorial Battle Royal (2019)
  - WWE Greatest Royal Rumble
  - WWE SmackDown Tag Team Championship #1 Contender Tournament (2023) – with Ricochet
  - WWE Year-End Award for Male Superstar of the Year (2018)

=== Strength athletics ===
- Arnold Amateur Strongman Championships
  - Winner (2012)
- Monster of the Midland
  - Winner (2010)
- NAS US Amateur National Championships
  - Winner (2011)
- Summerfest Strongman
  - Winner (2011)
- West Cary Fall Festival of Power
  - Winner (2011)

== Notes ==
Preceded by Baron Corbin	Mr. Money in the Bank; 2018	Succeeded by Brock Lesnar
