= Ethan Carter III =

American professional wrestler (born 1983)

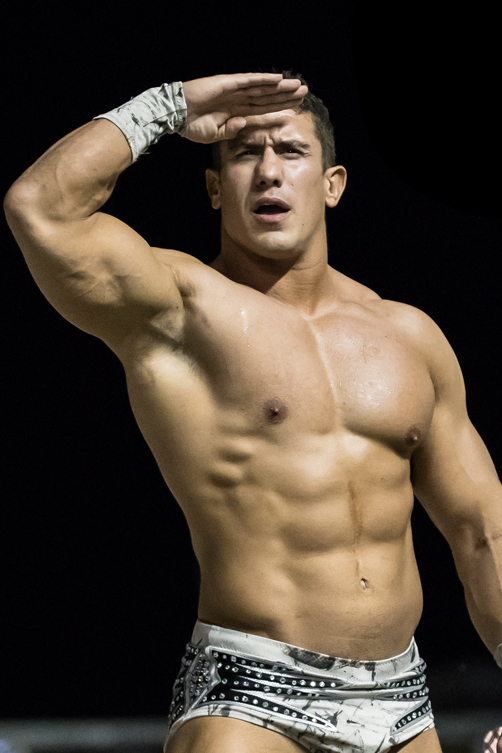
- EC3 in 2017

Personal information
- Born: Michael Hutter; March 18, 1983 (age 43) Willoughby, Ohio, U.S.

Professional wrestling career
- Ring name(s): Agent D Derrick Bateman; EC3; E-Singh-3; Ethan Carter III; Michael Hutter; Mike Hutter
- Billed height: 6 ft 2 in (188 cm)
- Billed weight: 231 lb (105 kg)
- Billed from: Boca Raton, Florida; Cleveland, Ohio; Palm Springs, Florida; Willoughby, Ohio
- Trained by: Florida Championship Wrestling; Bryan Danielson; J-Rocc; Rip Rogers; Al Snow
- Debut: 2002

Michael Hutter (born March 18, 1983), better known by his ring name Ethan Carter III (or simply EC3), is an American professional wrestler and promoter. He performs on the independent circuit – predominantly for Canadian Wrestling's Elite (CWE) and Juggalo Championship Wrestling (JCW) and is also the owner of the independent promotion Exodus Pro Wrestling. He is best known for his tenures with TNA Wrestling, National Wrestling Alliance (NWA), Ring of Honor (ROH) and WWE.

Hutter began his professional wrestling career in 2002, and began wrestling for the Ohio Valley Wrestling (OVW) promotion in 2007. In 2009, he signed a contract with WWE, where he competed as Derrick Bateman. He was assigned to WWE's developmental territory Florida Championship Wrestling (FCW), where he won the FCW Florida Tag Team Championship with Johnny Curtis. Under the name of Derrick Bateman, he competed in the fourth and fifth seasons of NXT, a program where rookies were paired with pros.

Hutter left WWE in May 2013 and then signed a contract with Total Nonstop Action Wrestling (TNA), working with the promotion as Ethan Carter III (often shortened as EC3), the storyline nephew of TNA's owner Dixie Carter. He won the TNA World Heavyweight Championship twice and the Impact Grand Championship once. He returned to WWE in January 2018 under the EC3 ring name, competing in NXT, before making his main roster debut in early 2019, where he held the WWE 24/7 Championship four times. His second tenure with WWE ended in April 2020, after which he started his own promotion, Control Your Narrative (CYN), which would merge with the National Wrestling Alliance (NWA) in 2022, leading to his signing with the promotion and would go on to win the NWA World's Heavyweight Championship once. He departed NWA in 2026 and returned to TNA that same year.

== Professional wrestling career ==
=== Early career (2002–2009) ===
Hutter was trained by J-Rocc in Cleveland and by Rip Rogers and Al Snow in OVW.

Hutter began his career in Cleveland wrestling regularly for several promotions in the Ohio region after making his debut. He wrestled for Pro Wrestling Ohio, making his debut on episode nine of the television show, as an ally of M-Dogg 20, under the name the "Deviant" Michael Hutter. He immediately began feuding with Josh Prohibition and Johnny Gargano and in the main event on episode 13 he teamed with Jason Bane to defeat Prohibition and Gargano. He made his final appearance for the promotion on episode 16, losing to Prohibition in a match to determine the participants in a match for the PWO Heavyweight Championship.

On June 27, 2007, Hutter appeared at a Derby City Wrestling show in Louisville, Kentucky, where he teamed with Osiris to defeat The Belgian Brawler and Apocalypse in a dark match. On December 9, 2007, Firestorm Pro Wrestling held its inaugural show Destroy Erase Improve, which saw the start of a six-man round robin tournament, in which Hutter competed. The tournament lasted nine months, before ending on September 12, 2008 at Something to Die For. That same show, Hutter won a six-man elimination match to become the inaugural Firestorm Pro Heavyweight Champion. Hutter made his last appearance with Firestorm Pro Wrestling on December 13, 2008, when he vacated the Firestorm Pro Heavyweight Championship, which he later awarded to John McChesney when McChesney won a four-way match for the vacant championship.

=== Ohio Valley Wrestling and early WWE appearances (2003, 2006–2007) ===
On April 14, 2003 Hutter appeared at the Heat tapings prior to Raw as Mike Hunter, where he was defeated by Rodney Mack.

On July 24, 2006 he appeared again at Heat, where he teamed with Chris Cronus in a loss to Viscera and Charlie Haas. He also appeared on Raw in August 2006, as a police officer with Shane McMahon who were to arrest D-Generation X.

Hutter made his Ohio Valley Wrestling (OVW) debut on the March 27, 2007 television tapings, where he lost to Tony Braddock in a dark match using his real name. The following week, he lost to Mike Mondo in a dark match, before changing his ring name to Mike Hutter. He competed in several more dark matches before the television tapings, teaming with Nick Nemeth and Chris Cage in a loss to Mike Kruel, Vladimir Kozlov and Boris Alexiev in a six-man tag team match, before losing to Mondo again. On the April 25 television tapings, Hutter teamed with TJ Dalton and Jamin Olivencia in defeat to Pat Buck, Johnny Punch and Braddock, before losing to Del Electrico in a dark match on the May 2 tapings. Throughout May, he went on to lose to Anthony Polaski (a renamed Tony Braddock) in a dark match and Dan Rodman, and on the May 23 tapings, he was attacked by Kruel, Kozlov, and Mr. Strongo. In his final OVW appearance in June, Hutter competed in a gauntlet match to earn a match against then United States Champion, Montel Vontavious Porter, but the match was won by Chet The Jet.

=== World Wrestling Entertainment (2009–2013) ===
==== Florida Championship Wrestling (2009–2010) ====
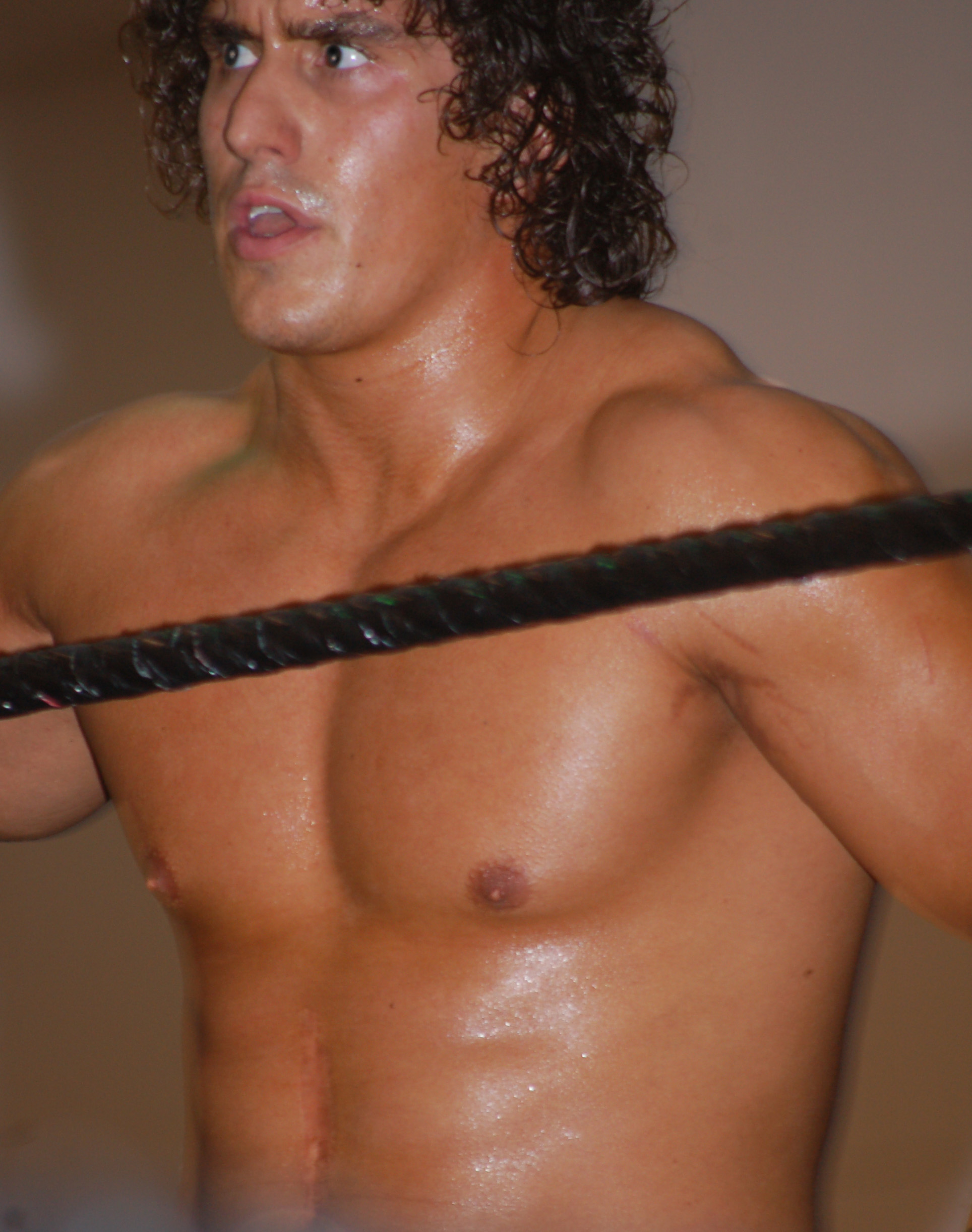
Hutter (as Derrick Bateman) at a FCW event in 2010

Hutter made his Florida Championship Wrestling (FCW) debut on February 9, 2009, as Mike Hutter, when he lost to Drew McIntyre. On February 19, he changed his ring name to Derrick Bateman, and gained Abraham Washington as a manager as he teamed with Lennox McEnroe in a loss to Scotty Goldman and DJ Gabriel. On the February 26 television tapings, Hutter, Washington, and Tristan Delta lost a dark match to Brett DiBiase, Maverick Darsow, and Tank Mulligan. In March, he and Dylan Klein lost to Kafu and Sweet Papi Sanchez. In April, he became known as Agent D, as part of Washington's Secret Service stable, alongside Agent T and Agent J. He reverted to his Derrick Bateman name in June, in a loss to DJ Gabriel.

On March 23, 2009 episode of RAW, Hutter acted as a cop to arrest Triple H after he invaded Randy Orton’s house in storyline.

After a hiatus, Bateman returned to FCW in 2010, teaming with Adam Henderson in a loss to The Rotundo Brothers (Bo and Duke). In March, he lost to Richie Steamboat and Joe Hennig in singles competition, and to Johnny Prime, Orlando Colón, and Incognito as part of a six-man tag team match, before defeating Rudy Parker. He went on to lose to Skip Sheffield, Percy Watson, Mason Ryan, Wes Brisco, and Eli Cottonwood over the next several months. In mid-2010, he formed a tag team known as The Handsome Man's Express with Leo Kruger, and the pair unsuccessfully challenged Los Aviadores (Hunico and Epico) for the FCW Florida Tag Team Championship on July 2. The Handsome Man's Express disbanded as a team shortly afterward, with Kruger defeating Bateman in a singles match on July 29. On August 12, 2010, Hutter teamed with Johnny Curtis to win the FCW Florida Tag Team Championship by defeating the team of Donny Marlow and Brodus Clay and the defending champions, Los Aviadores in a three-way tag team match. They went on to successfully defend the championship against Los Aviadores, Clay and Marlow, and The Dude Busters (Caylen Croft and Trent Barreta). After a near three-month reign, Bateman and Curtis lost the championship to Wes Brisco and Xavier Woods on November 4.

==== NXT (2010–2013) ====
During the finale of season three of NXT, it was announced that Bateman would be part of the fourth season, with Season 1 alumnus Daniel Bryan as his mentor. He made his in-ring debut on the December 7 episode of NXT, teaming with Daniel Bryan in a loss to Conor O'Brian and his Pro Alberto Del Rio. He had his first singles match on the December 14 episode of NXT, but lost to Alberto Del Rio via submission. For the next months, he participated in various challenges. Bateman made it to the final three competitors, but was eliminated on the February 22 episode of NXT. He then returned on the March 1 episode of NXT, competing in a tag team match with Conor O'Brian defeating the team of Byron Saxton and Jacob Novak. While competing on NXT, Bateman appeared in pre-taped vignette on Raw as a scientist with the "Bateman Institute" advertising a fictional Mark Henry cologne. He also made his SmackDown debut with Damien Sandow, who refused to fight him. Bateman wrestled his debut match against Ryback and lost.

After a period of absence from WWE programming, Bateman was inserted into the fifth season of NXT as a rookie midway into the competition, returning on the June 28, 2011 episode of NXT Redemption and bringing back his pro Daniel Bryan in the process. Meanwhile, Bateman's character began to show more villainous traits, eventually causing Bryan to abandon him after declaring that Bateman was making a fool out of himself. In July, Bateman started a long feud with Titus O'Neil that lasted until November, as both of them frequently traded wins and losses in a series of matches. In August, Maxine made her return to NXT as Bateman's girlfriend, and she started a concurrent feud with O'Neil's friend AJ. Bateman and Maxine lost to O'Neil and AJ on the September 6 episode of NXT Redemption. On the October 26 episode of NXT Redemption, Bateman proposed to Maxine, who accepted the proposal after slapping and kissing him. On the November 2 episode of NXT Redemption, Bateman and Maxine became known as "Beta-Max", and they participated in a six-person tag match along with JTG in a loss to O'Neil, AJ and Percy Watson.

On the November 9 episode of NXT Redemption, Maxine revealed to Bateman that she and his former friend Johnny Curtis went on a date, and they later tag teamed together in a winning effort against the team of Titus O' Neil and Percy Watson. On the December 7 episode of NXT Redemption, Bateman defeated Johnny Curtis in singles competition, turning face once again, and afterwards broke up with Maxine thinking he flirted with her mother. After Bateman again defeated Johnny Curtis in a singles match on the December 28 episode of NXT Redemption, Maxine again turned on Bateman, thinking he was trying to ruin her career, kissing Curtis and leaving with him. The next week on the January 4 episode of NXT Redemption, Bateman lost in singles competition to Darren Young after a distraction from Johnny Curtis and Maxine announcing that they're getting married in Las Vegas. On the 100th episode of NXT Redemption, Bateman interrupted Johnny Curtis and Maxine's wedding ceremony by showing a security camera video clip in his locker room of Johnny Curtis stealing Bateman's iPad and sending an email to Theodore Long about getting rid of Maxine and going to SmackDown, and was later reunited with Maxine.

On the February 15 episode of NXT Redemption, Bateman teamed with Justin Gabriel to defeat the team of Heath Slater and Johnny Curtis, and afterwards saved his friend Kaitlyn from Maxine. Two weeks later, Kaitlyn confessed her love for Bateman, kissing him during an intervention also involving Justin Gabriel and Alicia Fox, until Maxine came out and again attacked Kaitlyn. On the March 7 episode of NXT Redemption, Bateman was backstage with Johnny Curtis and Maxine, who revealed to Bateman that they are no longer dating after Kaitlyn kissed Bateman, leading to Bateman and Kaitlyn defeating Curtis and Maxine in a mixed tag team match. On the March 14 episode of NXT Redemption, he confessed his love for Kaitlyn and kissed her, solidifying their relationship. On the March 21 episode of NXT Redemption, Bateman and Kaitlyn were backstage with Tamina talking about his and Kaitlyn's newfound relationship, and later encountered Maxine and Johnny Curtis, who accused them of being involved with Matt Striker's disappearance. Bateman was accompanied by Kaitlyn in singles competition on the March 28 episode of NXT Redemption, losing to Hunico. Bateman and Kaitlyn discovered Matt Striker in a janitor's closet hidden by Curt Hawkins and Tyler Reks on the April 11 episode of NXT Redemption. On the April 25 episode of NXT Redemption, Bateman was attacked by JTG, but later went on to defeat him in singles competition. Bateman made his televised return on the May 4 episode of SmackDown where he once again faced Ryback, but was defeated. On the May 9 episode of NXT Redemption, Bateman was attacked backstage by an unknown person. On the May 30 episode of NXT Redemption, Bateman competed in a tag team match with Percy Watson and Justin Gabriel in a winning effort against Johnny Curtis, Michael McGillicutty, and JTG. Bateman competed on the June 8 episode of SmackDown against Brodus Clay in a losing effort. On the final episode of the fifth season of NXT on June 13, Bateman teamed with Percy Watson in a losing effort against Curt Hawkins and Tyler Reks.

After the conclusion of NXT Redemption, NXT transitioned into the renamed FCW developmental territory. Bateman then continued to appear on NXT, where he defeated rival Johnny Curtis on the June 27 episode of NXT. On the October 27 episode of Saturday Morning Slam, Bateman lost to United States Champion Antonio Cesaro in a non-title match. In January 2013, Bateman entered the NXT Tag Team Championship tournament along with Alex Riley, but they were eliminated in the first round after a loss to Kassius Ohno and Leo Kruger. On May 17, 2013, Bateman was released from his contract, ending his four-year tenure with the company. His final match prior to his release was a non-title match against NXT Champion Big E Langston on the May 29 tapings of NXT, which he lost.

=== Total Nonstop Action Wrestling / Impact Wrestling (2013–2018) ===
==== Team Dixie (2013–2015) ====
Hutter worked a dark match on August 29, 2013 before the Impact Wrestling television tapings in Cleveland, Ohio, losing to Jay Bradley. On September 26, TNA aired a vignette about a new talent, Ethan. The following week, another vignette aired as it was later reported that Hutter had signed with Total Nonstop Action Wrestling (TNA) and would be debuting with the new character as Dixie Carter's spoiled nephew. The following week, another vignette aired revealing Hutter's new ring name as Ethan Carter III (EC3).

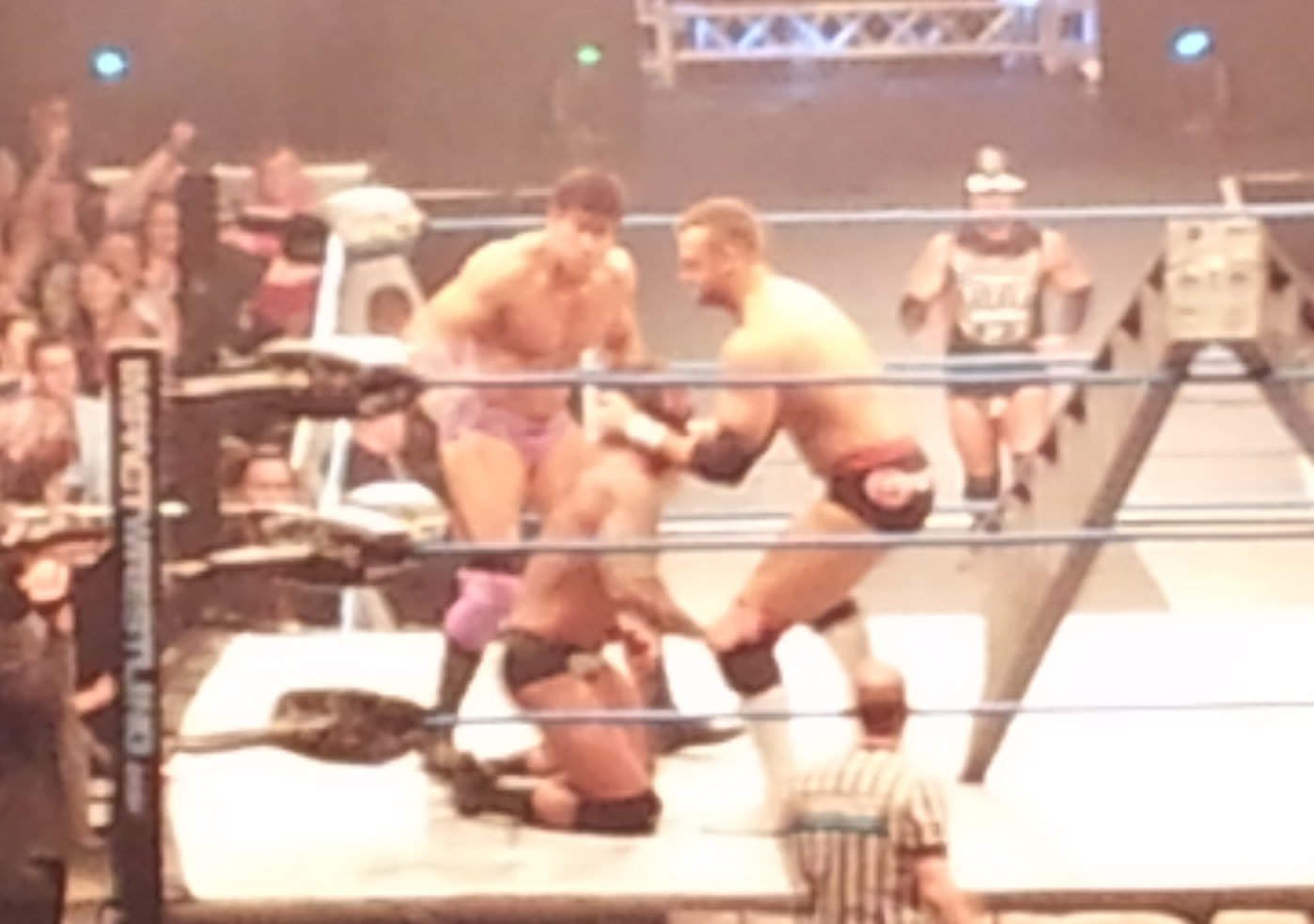
Ethan Carter III teaming with Magnus against Gunner and James Storm in a tag team ladder match

On October 20, Carter made his TNA debut at Bound for Glory as a heel, defeating jobber Norv Fernum. Carter defeated another jobber Dewey Barnes on the October 24 episode of Impact Wrestling. On November 21 at the Impact Wrestling: Turning Point special episode, Carter took a step up in competition defeating Shark Boy. Since then, Carter had matches with other jobbers, billed as TNA Legends, like Curry Man or referee Earl Hebner. On the December 12 episode of Impact Wrestling, Carter was confronted by Sting and was issued an option; either face Sting immediately, or enter the Feast or Fired match. Carter entered the Feast or Fired match and grabbed one of the briefcases, which was revealed to contain a future TNA World Tag Team Championship match. On the December 26 episode of Impact Wrestling, Carter teamed with Rockstar Spud and The BroMans (Robbie E and Jessie Godderz) in a four-on-two handicap match against Sting and Jeff Hardy, where Carter pinned Sting. On the January 2, 2014 episode of Impact Wrestling, Carter was challenged by Sting for a match at the Impact Wrestling: Genesis episode, a match which Carter would win after help from the special guest referees Magnus and Rockstar Spud. On the February 6 episode of Impact Wrestling, Carter attacked Kurt Angle to save Magnus from losing by submission against him, then launched a vicious assault targeting Angle's surgically repaired left knee, resulting in serious injuries. The following week, Carter teamed with Magnus losing to Gunner and James Storm in a tag team ladder match where Carter's and Gunner's Feast or Fired briefcases were on the line.

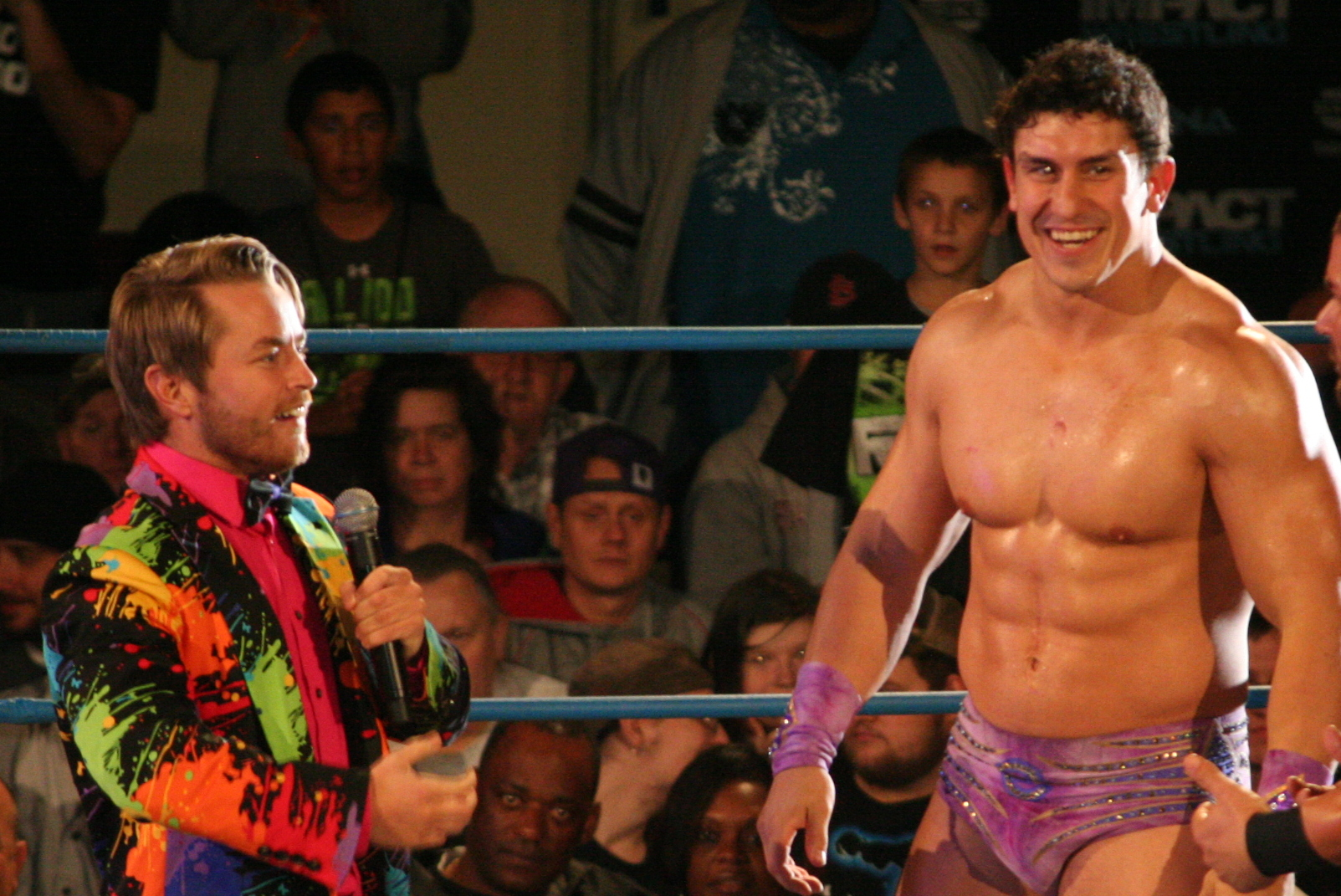
Ethan Carter III (right) with 'Chief of Staff' Rockstar Spud (left) in April 2014

On the February 6 episode of Impact Wrestling, Kurt Angle had a match against Magnus, which Angle won by disqualification, when EC3 attacked him, performing a leglock, which injured his knee. On the February 27 episode of Impact Wrestling, Angle officially accepted his induction into the TNA Hall of Fame, but the ceremony was interrupted by EC3, who said he tore Angle's knee ligaments and therefore must retire. However, Angle attacked him and challenged him to a match at Lockdown. On the March 6 episode of Impact Wrestling, Angle was attacked again by EC3. It was announced after that night's Impact Wrestling that Kurt Angle, due to EC3's attack, would be pulled from the Lockdown card due to a torn MCL. On March 9, at Lockdown, Bobby Lashley answered Carter's open challenge after his scheduled opponent (Kurt Angle) couldn't wrestle due to injury the match ended in a no contest. The following week on Impact Wrestling, Lashley and Carter had a rematch which Carter won via disqualification after an assault by Willow on Carter. This started a feud between the two, as EC3 and Rockstar Spud attempted to search for Willow in the woods. However, they were both attacked by Willow. At Sacrifice, they were defeated by Willow and a returning Kurt Angle. On the May 8, 2014 episode of Impact Wrestling, EC3 faced Kurt Angle, where EC3 won. During the match, Angle re-injured his knee, which allowed EC3 to capitalize on the victory and tear Angle's ACL.

After his feud with Kurt Angle, he started a feud with Bully Ray, who threatened to put his aunt, Dixie Carter, through a table after the match. This resulted in a Texas Death match at Slammiversary XII, which EC3 won with help from Dixie Carter and Rockstar Spud. Through TNA's relationship with Wrestle-1, Carter made his debut for the Japanese promotion in Tokyo on July 6, teaming with Rockstar Spud in a tag team match, where they were defeated by Tajiri and Yusuke Kodama. On the July 3 episode of Impact Wrestling, EC3 defeated Bully Ray in a tables match, following interference from Rhino on Carter's behalf. This prompted Ray to challenge EC3, Rhino, and Spud to a six-man hardcore match with Devon and Tommy Dreamer as his partners, which EC3's team won following interference from Rycklon and Snitsky. On the August 7 episode of Impact Wrestling, EC3, Rhino, Rycklon and Snitsky were defeated in an eight-man Hardcore War against Team 3D, Al Snow and Tommy Dreamer. Afterwards, Bully Ray fulfilled his four-month promise by putting Dixie Carter through a table. EC3 would then blame Rhino for Dixie Carter being put through a table, resulting in EC3 attacking him. The following week, he got himself disqualified by repeatedly hitting Rhino with a chair. Spud tried to stop EC3 from the beat down on Rhino, but EC3 threatened to hit him with a chair, thus teasing tension between the two.

On the October 8 episode of Impact Wrestling, Rockstar Spud snapped and slapped EC3, resulting in Carter firing him as his chief of staff. On October 12, at Bound for Glory, EC3 defeated sumo wrestler Ryota Hama. On the October 15 episode of Impact Wrestling, Carter introduced his new bodyguard Tyrus. Carter and Tyrus entered the TNA World Tag Team Championship number one contenders tournament defeating Eric Young and Rockstar Spud in the quarterfinals only to lose to The Hardys on the October 29 episode of Impact Wrestling in the semi-finals, when Tyrus was pinned by Matt Hardy. On December 31, Hutter re-signed with TNA for a multi-year contract. On the March 13, 2015 episode of Impact Wrestling, EC3's feud with Spud came to a conclusion in a hair vs. hair match which Carter won.

==== TNA World Heavyweight Champion (2015–2016) ====
After defeating Mr. Anderson on the May 29 episode of Impact Wrestling to become the number one contender, Carter defeated Kurt Angle on June 25, 2015 (which aired on tape delay on the July 1 episode of Impact Wrestling) to win the TNA World Heavyweight Championship for the first time in his career. Three days later, on June 28, at Slammiversary XIII, Carter and Tyrus defeated Anderson and Lashley in the co–main event. On the July 8 episode of Impact Wrestling, he retained the TNA World Heavyweight Championship three times in one night against Norv Fernum, Shark Boy and Kurt Angle. On the July 15 episode of Impact Wrestling, EC3 defeated Drew Galloway to retain his title. At No Surrender, EC3 defeated Matt Hardy in a Full Metal Mayhem match. He successfully retained his title against GFW wrestler PJ Black at Turning Point. Ethan Carter III gave Matt Hardy a last chance to win his title, in a Title vs. Jeff Hardy's Services match, which Matt Hardy accepted. On the September 2 episode of Impact Wrestling EC3 retained his title and won Jeff Hardy's services. On the September 23 episode of Impact Wrestling, Ethan Carter III successfully retained his title against his former rival Rockstar Spud. Ethan Carter III finally dropped the championship to Matt Hardy, who pinned Drew Galloway in a three-way match on October 4, at Bound For Glory, after special guest referee Jeff Hardy betrayed him, officially ending Carter's reign at 101 days.

Carter then filed an injunction (kayfabe) that banned Matt Hardy from appearing on Impact Wrestling for a month, which forced Hardy to relinquish the title in order to stay on the show. Throughout the rest of the year (taped in July), Carter began competing in the TNA World Title Series for an opportunity to regain the vacant championship, in which he continued his winning streak by defeating the likes of Lashley, Mr. Anderson, DJ Z and Davey Richards.

On the January 5, 2016 live episode of Impact Wrestling, during its premiere on Pop TV, Carter defeated Lashley in the semi–finals and Matt Hardy in the finals, to win the tournament and the TNA World Heavyweight Championship for a second time. Three days later, during the tapings of Impact Wrestling, which aired on January 19, Carter lost the title to Hardy in a Last Man Standing match, after Tyrus turned on Carter and attacked him, turning face in the process. In February, Carter started an alliance with his former rival Rockstar Spud in order to even things with Hardy and Tyrus, defeating them in a tag-team match on the February 16 episode of Impact Wrestling, only for Spud to attack Carter and cost him his rematch against Hardy during a six sides of steel match at Lockdown. On the March 29 episode of Impact Wrestling, EC3 defeated Matt Hardy, Rockstar Spud, Tyrus and Reby Hardy by disqualification in a Four On One Handicap match.

==== Various feuds (2016–2017) ====
On the March 29 episode of Impact Wrestling Mike Bennett declined a challenge issued to him by Ethan Carter III, leading to Bennett attacking Carter and officially starting a feud between the two. During the April 12 episode of Impact Wrestling, Bennett and Carter had a match that ended in disqualification when Carter attacked Bennett with a steel chair. On the April 26 episode of Impact Wrestling: Sacrifice, Bennett defeated Carter by pinfall, ending Carter's unpinned streak. On the May 10 episode of Impact Wrestling, Bennett declined another challenge from Carter unless Carter faced three of his former enemies; if Carter won all the three matches, then he would get to face Bennett at Slammiversary, to which Carter agreed. His first match was against Rockstar Spud in a Six Sides of Steel match, which Carter won. On the May 17 episode of Impact Wrestling, Carter's second match was against Tyrus in a Last Man Standing match, which Carter won. On the May 24 episode of Impact Wrestling, Carter won his last match against Matt Hardy, but Bennett refused to give him his rematch, since Carter won by disqualification. On the May 31 episode of Impact Wrestling, Carter was put in charge of the show, and he made the match between himself and Bennett official for Slammiversary. On the June 7 episode of Impact Wrestling, EC3 and Gail Kim defeated Mike Bennett and Allie. Ethan Carter III defeated Bennett in a singles match at Slammiversary on June 12.

On two separate occasions, Carter got involved in Drew Galloway's matches with the purpose of aiding him. However his plans backfired when he inadvertently ended up striking Galloway with a chair on the first occasion and the second occasion he struck him with a kendo stick. Following on from this, the two began a heated rivalry, fighting each other on several occasions, including an unsanctioned fight that led to a no-contest at Destination X. Later in August, Carter was involved in the Playoff, the winner of the series would go on to main event the PPV against the reigning champion at the time of the event. Before appearing in his own semi-final match against Matt Hardy, Carter interfered in a match between Drew Galloway and Mike Bennett, during which he intended to try and make-good on his recent mistakes costing Galloway matches. However, as before, he once again struck Drew Galloway, costing him the match. Carter would eventually win the series defeating long-time rival Mike Bennett. Galloway challenged Carter to a match with the winner going on to face the champion at Bound for Glory. The next week, Carter defeated Galloway, with Aron Rex as special referee, to keep his spot in the main event of Bound for Glory against Lashley. At Bound for Glory, he was defeated by Lashley. After the PPV, he started a feud against Eli Drake after his Fact of Life segment on the October 6 episode of Impact Wrestling. On the October 27 episode of Impact Wrestling, Carter and Jessie Godderz were defeated by Eli Drake and Aron Rex. On the November 24 episode of Impact Wrestling, Carter defeated Eli Drake in a title shot vs. voice match where if Carter lost, he would lose his TNA World Heavyweight title shot and if Drake lost, he would not be able to talk for the rest of 2016. On the December 8 episode of Impact Wrestling, his match against Eddie Edwards for the TNA World Heavyweight Championship ended in a no contest.

On the January 5, 2017, episode of Impact Wrestling, he challenged Lashley and Eddie Edwards for Edwards' TNA World Heavyweight Championship in a three-way match, in a losing effort. At One Night Only: Live!, Carter was defeated by Eddie Edwards, and failed to win the TNA World Heavyweight Championship. On the January 12 episode of Impact Wrestling, Carter was defeated by Lashley in a Last Man Standing match and failed to become number one contender to the TNA World Heavyweight Championship. On the March 9 episode of Impact Wrestling, Carter interrupted the debut of Alberto El Patron saying that he does not deserve a World Championship match. However, his speech was ignored, and a match between El Patron and Lashley was scheduled. Carter watched the main event and congratulated El Patron for his championship win. However, when El Patron relinquished the TNA World Heavyweight Championship, a match between Carter and him for the number one contender was scheduled the following week, which El Patron won by submission.

==== Impact Grand Champion and departure (2017–2018) ====
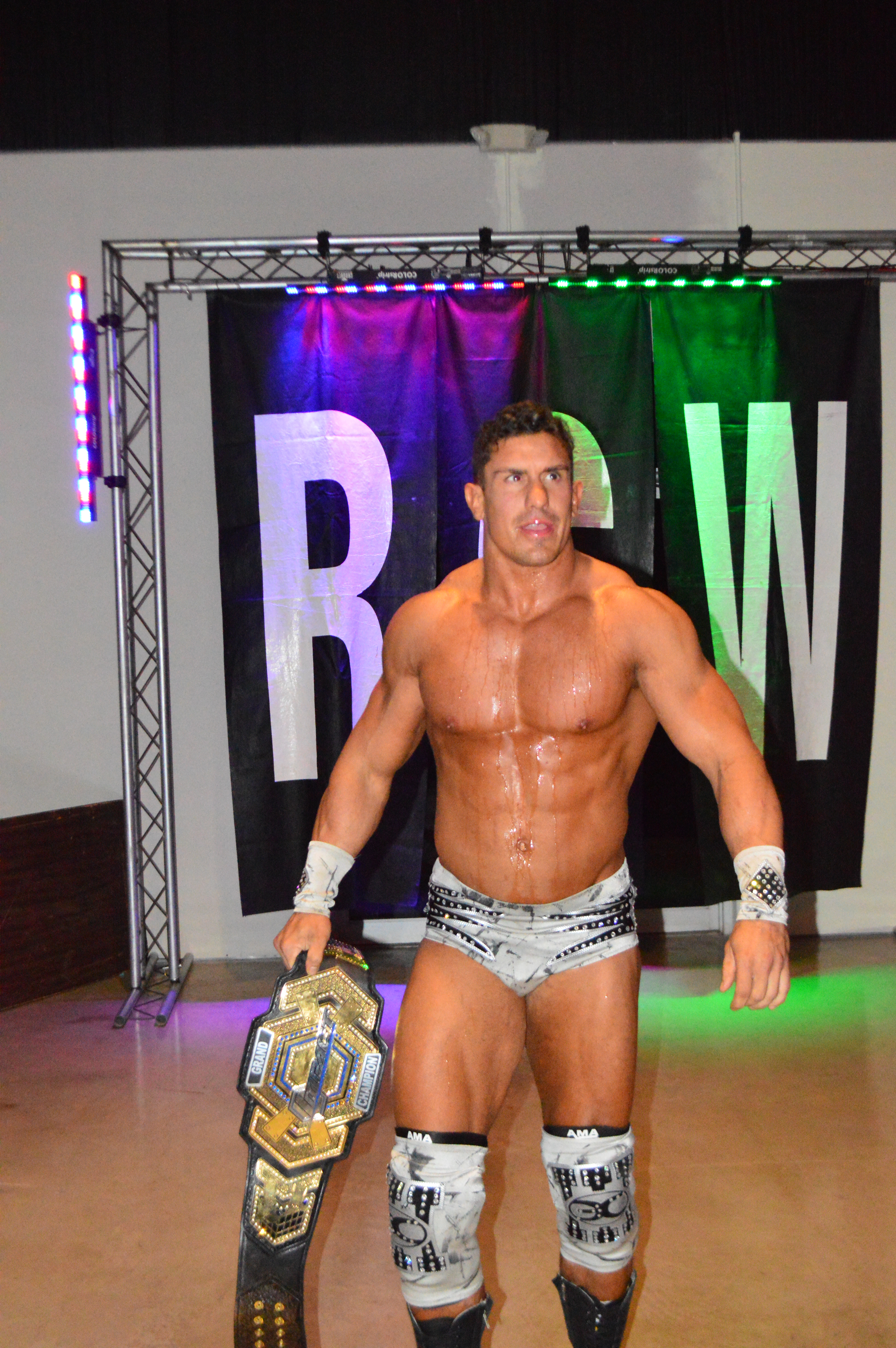
Carter as Impact Grand Champion in September 2017

On April 20 episode of Impact Wrestling, Carter interfered in the match between Lashley and James Storm for the World Heavyweight Championship, hitting Storm over the head with a beer bottle, thus turning heel in the process once again. On the May 11 episode of Impact Wrestling, Carter came out dressed as a cowboy and proceeded to berate Storm and the new management of Impact Wrestling. Storm then tried to attack Carter, but Carter retaliated by lashing Storm over thirty times with a leather belt, causing significant injury to his back. The following week, Carter was defeated by Storm, after Carter brutally lashed the referee. After the match however, he tried to attack Storm after which Storm came out on top, but was immediately attacked by Magnus. Then, Bruce Prichard announced a three-way match between Carter, Storm and Magnus to determine the number one contender to the Impact World Heavyweight Championship, but after an altercation with Prichard, Carter attacked him. On the May 25 episode of Impact Wrestling, Carter defeated Storm and Magnus to become the number one contender to the Impact Wrestling Heavyweight Championship. However, on the June 1 episode of Impact Wrestling, Carter was defeated by Alberto El Patrón in a Six Sides of Steel match, failing to win the GFW Global Championship and lost his opportunity to face Lashley at Slammiversary. At Slammiversary, Carter defeated Storm in a Strap match.

After that, Carter was put in the orbit of the Impact Grand Championship, which he won on the August 3 episode of Impact Wrestling, when he defeated Moose via split decision to win the Impact Grand Championship. On the August 24 episode of Impact Wrestling, Carter entered in the twenty man Gauntlet for the Gold match for the vacant GFW World Heavyweight Championship at number 7, but was eliminated by Moose and Eddie Edwards. Then, he started a feud with El Hijo del Fantasma, Pagano and El Texano Jr., Mexican luchadores from Lucha Libre AAA Worldwide (AAA). This culminated in a match at Bound for Glory, where Carter, Storm and Edwards defeated Hijo del Fantasma, Pagano and Texano. After defences against Hijo del Fantasma and Fallah Bahh, Carter put the title on the line against Matt Sydal, but the match ended in a draw. On the January 4 episode of Impact Wrestling, Carter retained his title in a three-way match against Sydal and Fallah Bahh. At Genesis, he dropped the title to Sydal. On January 13, 2018, Carter was released from his contract by Impact Wrestling, but remained on Impact programming until March, as his appearances were filmed before his departure.

On the February 1 episode of Impact Wrestling, Carter and Alberto El Patrón were defeated by Moose and Johnny Impact in a tag team match. This led to a fatal-four-way match the following week to determine the number one contender for the Impact World Championship, which was won by Impact. On the February 15 episode of Impact Wrestling, Carter teamed with a returning Tyrus and defeated Impact and Sydal. After the match, Carter challenged Impact for a match where if he won, he takes his number one contender spot, which Impact accepted. However, Carter lost the match the following week after a misunderstanding with him and Tyrus. On the March 1 episode of Impact Wrestling, Carter was defeated by Tyrus. On the March 15 episode of Impact Wrestling, Carter participated at the Feast or Fired match where he picked one of the briefcases alongside Eli Drake, Petey Williams, and Moose. After the match, he attacked Tyrus with the briefcase. The following week, Carter opened his briefcase, which was revealed to be the Pink Slip, and resulted in him being fired. After initially rejecting the result, he accepted his fate and was cheered by the Impact Zone despite being a heel. However, he attacked Jeremy Borash with his briefcase, before being confronted and attacked by Brian Cage.

=== Return to WWE (2018–2020) ===
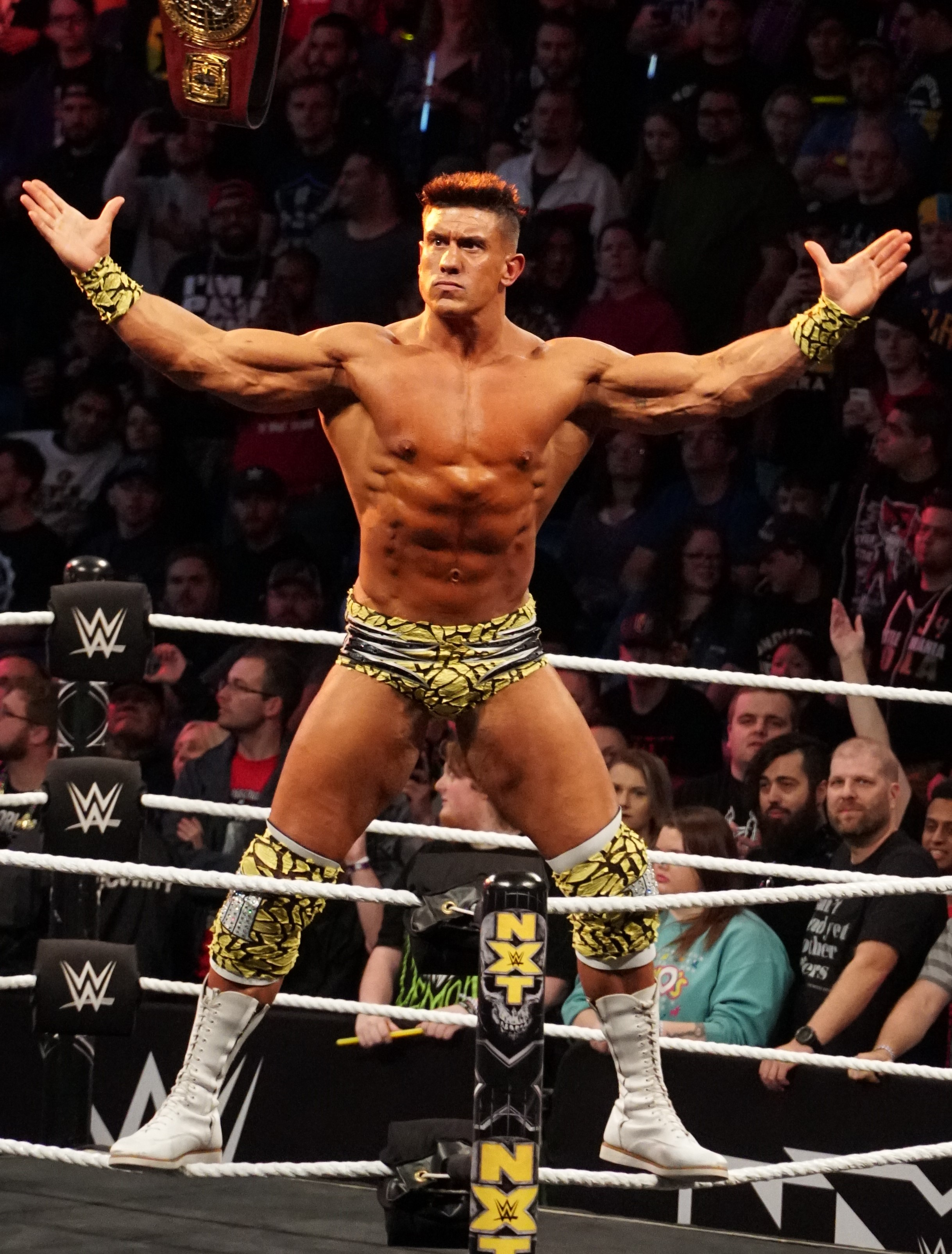
EC3 in April 2018

On January 27, 2018, under his EC3 moniker, he returned to WWE and its developmental territory NXT, sitting in the audience at NXT TakeOver: Philadelphia. On the March 28 episode of NXT, EC3 returned to NXT, where he was announced as a participant in a six-man ladder match for the NXT North American Championship at NXT TakeOver: New Orleans against Adam Cole, Killian Dain, Lars Sullivan, Ricochet, and Velveteen Dream, where he was unsuccessful.

Throughout the summer, he began a feud with Velveteen Dream, after Dream walked out on EC3 during a tag team match. This led to a match between the two at NXT TakeOver: Brooklyn 4, where EC3 was defeated by Dream. During his match against Dream, he suffered a concussion, delaying the plans to call him up to the main roster during the summer.

On December 17, 2018, it was announced EC3 would be debuting on the main roster. During the following weeks, he was seen during backstage segments of Raw and SmackDown Live, before making his official debut on the February 4, 2019 episode of Raw, appearing on Alexa Bliss' talk show A Moment Of Bliss. During the segment, EC3 was interrupted by Dean Ambrose, leading to a match that EC3 won. The following week on Raw, they competed in a rematch, which Ambrose won with a small package. After his short feud with Ambrose, EC3 would be off Raw for the following months, and was relegated to Main Event as a jobber. At the WrestleMania 35 pre-show on April 7, EC3 competed in the André the Giant Memorial Battle Royal, but was eliminated early in the match.

EC3 was drafted to the Raw brand as part of the Superstar Shake-up. In a dark match before the April 9 episode of SmackDown, EC3 was managed by Drake Maverick. However, Vince McMahon was reported to have disliked the match, so the partnership was not brought to television. Following that, he was mainly used in comedic roles, including being among the group of undercard wrestlers that competed for WWE 24/7 Championship. EC3 competed in the 51-man battle royal at Super ShowDown on June 7, his only main card pay-per-view appearance of the year, but he was the first competitor eliminated and the match was ultimately won by Mansoor. On the June 24 episode of Raw, EC3 pinned 24/7 Champion Cedric Alexander, to claim his first championship within the company, but quickly dropped it to R-Truth seconds later following a distraction by Carmella. EC3 would win the 24/7 Championship three more times in September, trading it back and forth with R-Truth across several house shows, becoming a four-time champion. In doing so EC3 has the most 24/7 title reigns that has not lasted longer than a full day. In November, it was reported that EC3 was injured with a concussion. On April 15, 2020, EC3 was released from his WWE contract as part of budget cuts stemming from the COVID-19 pandemic, ending his second tenure with the company.

=== Control Your Narrative (2020–2022) ===
After his WWE departure in 2020, Hutter reinvented his EC3 gimmick as a much darker and enigmatic crusader. Known as "The Essential Character", Hutter began to release a series of videos in which he expressed his desire to control the narrative. This led to a series of cinematic matches. The first match took place at Impact Wrestling's Bound for Glory against Moose, where he was defeated. In May, he hosted his own PPV, Free the Narrative, where he defeated Matt Cardona. In October, EC3 hosted his second show, Free the Narrative II, where he faced Adam Scherr in the main event, being defeated. Hutter and Scherr began to work together and, on February 17, 2022, they announced Control Your Narrative (CYN). Taking inspiration from Fight Club, the promotion featured talent booking their own storylines in a way that resembled the early stages of Fight Club's "Project: Mayhem".

=== Ring of Honor (2020–2021) ===
On the October 19 episode of ROH Television, EC3 made his debut for the promotion cutting a promo in the ring. Afterwards, he was confronted backstage by Shane Taylor and S.O.S. (Soldiers of Savagery) where they challenged him and The Briscoes to a match which they accepted. The match was cancelled after EC3 tested positive for COVID-19, he would sign a contract with ROH on February 25. He was released after ROH announced they would be closing their doors.

=== National Wrestling Alliance (2022–2026) ===
On night one of the NWA's 74th anniversary show, EC3 made his National Wrestling Alliance (NWA) debut winning via submission over Mims. On Nuff Said pre-show it was announced that EC3 has officially signed to NWA. Later in the night, EC3 scored a submission victory over Kevin Kiley the former Alex Riley. On the February 14, 2023 episode of NWA Powerrr, EC3 shows up to applaud the NWA World Champion Tyrus’ victory over Rolando Freeman, accompanied by BLK Jeez. The following week, lead announcer Joe Galli interviewed EC3 and BLK Jeez about what transpired, though EC3 simply stated that he was only "controlling his narrative". He later went on to challenge Cyon for the NWA National Championship at NWA 312, which would later be made official. At NWA 312 on April 7, EC3 defeated Cyon to win the NWA National Heavyweight Championship. On the May 2 episode of Powerrr, EC3 successfully defended his title in his first title defense against Carnage. EC3 successfully defended the NWA National Championship on both nights of the Crockett Cup against Silas Mason with Pollo Del Mar and NWA World Television Champion Thom Latimer.

After successfully defending the title against “Thrillbilly” Silas Mason, EC3 dropped the title in the ring, officially relinquishing it to challenge Tyrus for the NWA World's Heavyweight Championship at NWA 75th Anniversary Show. On August 27 at NWA 75, EC3 defeated Tyrus in a bullrope match to become the NWA World's Heavyweight Champion. On September 26 episode of Powerrr, EC3 successfully defended his title in his first title defense against Jay Bradley. On October 28 at NWA Samhain, EC3 successfully defended the NWA World's Heavyweight Championship against Thom Latimer. On November 14 episode of Powerrr, EC3 successfully defended his title against Talos. On March 2, 2024 at Hard Times, EC3 successfully defended his title against "Thrillbilly" Silas Mason. On August 31 at NWA 76th Anniversary Show, EC3 lost the NWA World's Heavyweight Championship to Thom Latimer, ending his reign at 370 days.

On January 1, 2026, EC3 announced that he would be leaving NWA, ending his near four-year tenure with the promotion.

=== Juggalo Championship Wrestling (2026–present) ===
On March 21, 2026, during a taping for the April 16, 2026 episode of JCW Lunacy, EC3 made his Juggalo Championship Wrestling (JCW) debut when he was announced to be the special guest referee for a four-way elimination match for the JCW World Heavyweight Championship with Jeeves as his valet at the Strangle-Mania: Viva Las Violence pay-per-view. During the Strangle-Mania: Viva Las Violence pay-per-view on April 17, 2026, EC3 proceeded to clean up the blood of Kenta from a previous match before refereeing the four-way JCW World Heavyweight Championship elimination match which consisted of CoKane defending the title against Matt Riddle, Caleb Konley, and Nic Nemeth. On April 18, 2026 during a taping for the April 30, 2026 episode of JCW Lunacy, EC3 wrestled in his first JCW match against Kerry Morton which featured Caleb Konley as a special guest referee. However, the match would end in a no contest due to interference from Matt Cross. On May 25, 2026, during the Mayday! On The Front Lines tour, EC3 wrestled in a two-on-one handicap match against Choppa City (Atiba and Bruce Wayans). On July 24, 2026 during Superfly July, EC3 was announced to join the Juggalo World Order in a war games match at Bloodymania 19 against Big Vito and the Luciano Family.

=== Return to TNA (2026) ===
On April 10, 2026, TNA released a video on social media teasing the return of EC3 at Rebellion. The following day, the promotion officially confirmed his return at the event. At TNA Rebellion, he returned and attacked Eric Young. The feud ended with EC3 losing to Young in a No Disqualification match on the May 7 episode of Impact!, which marked EC3's final appearance for the company as he would later be removed from the company's roster page in September.

== Other media ==
EC3 has appeared in video games as a playable character in WWE 2K19 (as a downloadable character) and WWE 2K20.

== Championships and accomplishments ==
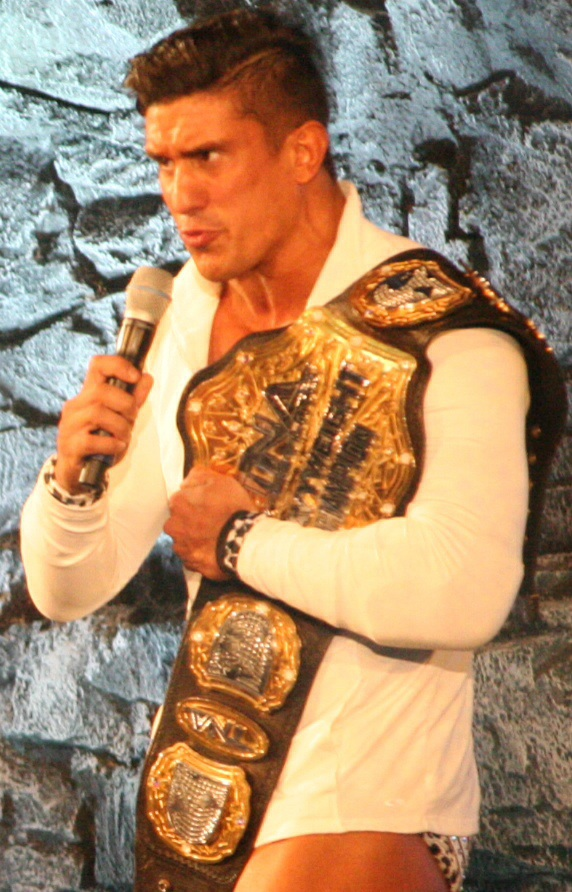
Carter is a two-time TNA World Heavyweight Champion

- Absolute Intense Wrestling
  - AIW Absolute Championship (1 time)
- Atomic Revolutionary Wrestling
  - ARW Heavyweight Championship (1 time)
- Florida Championship Wrestling
  - FCW Florida Tag Team Championship (1 time) – with Johnny Curtis
- Firestorm Pro Wrestling
  - Firestorm Pro Heavyweight Championship (1 time)
- House of Glory
  - House of Glory Heavyweight Championship (1 time)
- National Wrestling Alliance
  - NWA World's Heavyweight Championship (1 time)
  - NWA National Championship (1 time)
- Ohio Valley Wrestling
  - OVW National Heavyweight Championship (1 time)
- Premier Streaming Network
  - Premier Men's Championship (1 time, final)
- Pro Wrestling Illustrated
  - Ranked No. 20 of the top 500 singles wrestlers in the PWI 500 in 2016
- Total Nonstop Action Wrestling / Impact Wrestling / Global Force Wrestling
  - TNA World Heavyweight Championship (2 times)
  - Impact Grand Championship (1 time)
  - Feast or Fired (2013 – World Tag Team Championship contract)
  - Feast or Fired (2018 – Pink Slip)
  - TNA Joker's Wild (2014)
  - TNA World Title Series (2016)
  - Bound for Glory Playoffs (2016)
  - Moment of the Year (2020) – returning to Impact at Slammiversary, shared with the other returns and debuts that night
- WrestleCircus
  - WC Ringmaster Championship (1 time)
- Forever Rivals Wrestling
  - Forever Rivals World Conquest Championship (1 time, current)
- WWE
  - WWE 24/7 Championship (4 times)

== Luchas de Apuestas record ==
Winner (wager)	Loser (wager)	Location	Event	Date	Notes
Ethan Carter III (hair)	Rockstar Spud (hair)	London, England	Impact Wrestling	January 31, 2015	Aired March 13, 2015
