= Euro Catch Festival =

Professional wrestling event

- Created by: Otto Wanz; Peter William
- Promotions: Catch Wrestling Association
- First event: Euro Catch Festival (1991)
- Last event: Euro Catch Festival (1999)
- Event gimmick: CWA's flagship event

Euro Catch Festival was an annual professional wrestling event produced by Catch Wrestling Association (CWA) between 1991 and 1999. The event was hailed as the company's flagship event and the biggest event of the year. Two editions of the event were held once a year; the July event was held in Graz, Austria and the December event was held in Bremen, Germany. The 1999 edition of the event was the final CWA show as the promotion closed after that event.

Rambo headlined all of the events with the exception of the July 1996 edition which was headlined by Ludvig Borga and August Smisl. All the events were headlined by a match for the promotion's top title, the prestigious CWA World Heavyweight Championship, with the exception of the 1999 event, which was headlined by a CWA World Middleweight Championship match between Franz Schumann and Jesus Cristobal, which would be the final match in CWA history.

== Dates, venues and main events ==
Event	Date	Location	Venue	Attendance	Main Event(s)	Ref
Euro Catch Festival (1991)	December 21, 1991	Bremen, Germany	Stadthalle Bremen	10,000	Rambo (c) vs. Ken Patera for the CWA World Heavyweight Championship	
Euro Catch Festival in Graz (1992)	July 11, 1992	Graz, Austria	Eisstadion Liebenau	3,500	Rambo (c) vs. Terry Funk for the CWA World Heavyweight Championship	
Euro Catch Festival in Bremen (1992)	December 19, 1992	Bremen, Germany	Stadthalle Bremen	8,000	Rambo (c) vs. Road Warrior Hawk for the CWA World Heavyweight Championship	
Euro Catch Festival (1993)	December 18, 1993	Bremen, Germany	Stadthalle Bremen	7,107	Rambo (c) vs. The Barbarian for the CWA World Heavyweight Championship	
Euro Catch Festival in Graz (1994)	July 9, 1994	Graz, Austria	Eisstadion Liebenau	—	Rambo (c) vs. Papa Shango for the CWA World Heavyweight Championship	
Euro Catch Festival in Bremen (1994)	December 17, 1994	Bremen, Germany	Stadthalle Bremen	6,000	Rambo (c) vs. Big Titan for the CWA World Heavyweight Championship	
Euro Catch Festival in Graz (1995)	July 8, 1995	Graz, Austria	Eisstadion Liebenau	3,000	Rambo (c) vs. Jim Neidhart for the CWA World Heavyweight Championship	
Euro Catch Festival in Bremen (1995)	December 16, 1995	Bremen, Germany	Stadthalle Bremen	5,000	Rambo (c) vs. Ludvig Borga for the CWA World Heavyweight Championship	
Euro Catch Festival in Graz (1996)	July 6, 1996	Graz, Austria	Eisstadion Liebenau	4,000	Ludvig Borga (c) vs. August Smisl for the CWA World Heavyweight Championship	
Euro Catch Festival in Bremen (1996)	December 21, 1996	Bremen, Germany	Marquee on the Bürgerweide	2,500	Ludvig Borga (c) vs. Rambo for the CWA World Heavyweight Championship	
Euro Catch Festival (1997)	July 5, 1997	Graz, Austria	Eisstadion Liebenau	2,800	Rambo (c) vs. Duke Droese for the CWA World Heavyweight Championship	
Euro Catch Festival (1998)	December 12, 1998	Bremen, Germany	Stadthalle Bremen	1,000	Big Titan vs. Rambo for the vacant CWA World Heavyweight Championship	
Euro Catch Festival (1999)	December 4, 1999	Bremen, Germany	Marquee on the Bürgerweide	1,600	Franz Schumann (c) vs. Jesus Cristobal for the CWA World Middleweight Championship	
(c) – refers to the champion(s) heading into the match

== Event history ==
=== 1991 ===
Euro Catch Festival (1991)
- Promotion: Catch Wrestling Association
- Date: December 21, 1991
- City: Bremen, Germany
- Venue: Stadthalle Bremen
- Attendance: 10,000

Event chronology
← Previous; First	Next → 1992 (Graz)

Euro Catch Festival (1991) was the first Euro Catch Festival professional wrestling event produced by Catch Wrestling Association (CWA). The event took place on December 21, 1991, at Stadthalle Bremen in Bremen, Germany. The event was a success as it drew a crowd of 10,000 people in a seating capacity of 3,500 people.

Show results

No.	Results	Stipulations	Times
1	Tony St. Clair defeated Greg Valentine by disqualification	Singles match	—
2	Chris Benoit and Dave Taylor defeated Franz Schumann and Mile Zrno (c)	Two out of three falls match for the CWA World Tag Team Championship	—
3	Fit Finlay defeated Steve Wright (c) in Round 9	Singles match for the CWA World Middleweight Championship	—
4	Bull Power defeated Tatsumi Fujinami	Singles match for the inaugural CWA Intercontinental Heavyweight Championship	28:38
5	Rambo (c) defeated Ken Patera in Round 8	Singles match for the CWA World Heavyweight Championship	—
(c) / – the champion(s) heading into the match

=== 1992 (Graz) ===
Euro Catch Festival (1992 - Graz)
- Promotion: Catch Wrestling Association
- Date: July 11, 1992
- City: Graz, Austria
- Venue: Eisstadion Liebenau
- Attendance: 3,500

Event chronology
← Previous; 1991	Next → 1992 (Bremen)

Euro Catch Festival (1992) was the second edition of the Euro Catch Festival and marked the first time that the event was held twice a year. The first Euro Catch Festival of the year was held on July 11, 1992, at Eisstadion Liebenau in Graz, Austria and the second Euro Catch Festival was held on December 19, 1992, at Stadthalle Bremen in Bremen, Germany.

Show results

No.	Results	Stipulations
1	Tony St. Clair defeated Klaus Kauroff by disqualification	Singles match
2	Larry Cameron and Mad Bull Buster defeated Mile Zrno and Steve Regal	Two out of three falls match for the vacant CWA World Tag Team Championship
3	Tatsumi Fujinami defeated Bob Orton, Jr.	Singles match for the vacant CWA Intercontinental Heavyweight Championship
4	Franz Schumann defeated Fit Finlay (c)	Singles match for the CWA World Middleweight Championship
5	Rambo (c) defeated Terry Funk	Singles match for the CWA World Heavyweight Championship
(c) / – the champion(s) heading into the match

=== 1992 (Bremen) ===
Euro Catch Festival (1992 - Bremen)
- Promotion: Catch Wrestling Association
- Date: December 19, 1992
- City: Bremen, Germany
- Venue: Stadthalle Bremen
- Attendance: 8,000

Event chronology
← Previous; 1992 (Graz)	Next → 1993

Show results

No.	Results	Stipulations
1	Dave Taylor defeated Giant Haystacks in Round 3	Singles match
2	Larry Cameron and Mad Bull Buster (c) defeated Derrick Dukes and Steve Regal	Two out of three falls match for the CWA World Tag Team Championship
3	Bruiser Mastino defeated Cannonball Grizzly in Round 3	Body Slam Challenge
4	Jushin Thunder Liger defeated Franz Schumann in Round 9	Singles match
5	Fit Finlay defeated Eddie Gilbert in Round 7	Singles match for the vacant CWA World Middleweight Championship
6	Heavy Metal Buffalo (c) defeated The Warlord in Round 5	Singles match for the CWA Intercontinental Heavyweight Championship
7	Road Warrior Hawk defeated Rambo (c) in Round 6	Singles match for the CWA World Heavyweight Championship
(c) / – the champion(s) heading into the match

=== 1993 ===
Euro Catch Festival (1993)
- Promotion: Catch Wrestling Association
- Date: December 18, 1993
- City: Bremen, Germany
- Venue: Stadthalle Bremen
- Attendance: 5,000

Event chronology
← Previous; 1992 (Bremen)	Next → 1994 (Graz)

Euro Catch Festival (1993) was the third Euro Catch Festival event which took place on December 18, 1993, at the Stadthalle Bremen in Bremen, Germany.

Show results

No.	Results	Stipulations
1	Hiro Yamamoto defeated Alex Wright	Singles match
2	Papa Shango defeated Ulf Herman in Round 4	Singles match
3	Tony St. Clair defeated Terry Funk in Round 6	Falls Count Anywhere match
4	Fit Finlay (c) vs. Jushin Thunder Liger ended in a time limit draw in Round 10	Singles match for the CWA Intercontinental Heavyweight Championship
5	Franz Schumann (c) defeated Reno Riggins in Round 7	Singles match for the CWA World Middleweight Championship
6	Lord Steven Casey defeated Stan Hansen by disqualification in Round 6	Singles match to determine the #1 contender for the CWA World Heavyweight Championship
7	Rambo (c) defeated The Barbarian in Round 6	Singles match for the CWA World Heavyweight Championship
(c) / – the champion(s) heading into the match

=== 1994 (Graz) ===
Euro Catch Festival (1994 - Graz)
- Promotion: Catch Wrestling Association
- Date: July 9, 1994
- City: Graz, Austria
- Venue: Eisstadion Liebenau

Event chronology
← Previous; 1993	Next → 1994 (Bremen)

Euro Catch Festival (1994) was held twice in 1994. The first event was held on July 9, 1994, at Eisstadion Liebenau in Graz, Austria and the second event was held on December 17, 1994, at Stadthalle Bremen in Bremen, Germany.

Show results

No.	Results	Stipulations
1	August Smisl and Ulf Herman defeated Giant Haystacks and Primo Carnera	Two out of three falls match
2	Ice Train defeated Hiro Yamamoto in Round 3	Singles match
3	Lord Steven Casey and Tony St. Clair defeated Fit Finlay and John Hawk	Two out of three falls match for the vacant CWA World Tag Team Championship
4	Franz Schumann defeated Barry Horowitz (c) in Round 6	Singles match for the CWA World Middleweight Championship
5	Cannonball Grizzly defeated Jim Duggan by disqualification	Singles match
6	Rambo (c) defeated Papa Shango in Round 6	Singles match for the CWA World Heavyweight Championship
(c) / – the champion(s) heading into the match

=== 1994 (Bremen) ===
Euro Catch Festival (1994 - Bremen)
- Promotion: Catch Wrestling Association
- Date: December 17, 1994
- City: Bremen, Germany
- Venue: Stadthalle Bremen
- Attendance: 6,000

Event chronology
← Previous; 1994 (Graz)	Next → 1995 (Graz)

The Euro Catch Festival (1994) edition of Bremen was held on December 17, 1994, at the Stadthalle Bremen in Bremen, Germany.

Show results

No.	Results	Stipulations
1	Hiro Yamamoto defeated 2 Cold Scorpio	Singles match
2	August Smisl, Ice Train and Ulf Herman defeated Cannonball Grizzly, Dan Collins and John Hawk	Elimination tag team match
3	Steve Wright defeated Hias	Singles match for Alpen Cup with Klaus Baumgart as the special guest referee
4	Masahiro Chono defeated Tony St. Clair	Singles match
5	Fit Finlay (c) defeated Doink the Clown in Round 8	Singles match for the CWA Intercontinental Heavyweight Championship
6	Franz Schumann (c) defeated Dick Slater in Round 7	Singles match for the CWA World Middleweight Championship
7	Rambo (c) defeated Big Titan in Round 5	Singles match for the CWA World Heavyweight Championship
(c) / – the champion(s) heading into the match

=== 1995 (Graz) ===
Euro Catch Festival (1995 - Graz)
- Promotion: Catch Wrestling Association
- Date: July 8, 1995
- City: Graz, Austria
- Venue: Eisstadion Liebenau
- Attendance: 3,000

Event chronology
← Previous; 1994 (Bremen)	Next → 1995 (Bremen)

Euro Catch Festival (1995) was held on July 8, 1995, at the Eisstadion Liebenau in Graz, Austria.

Show results

No.	Results	Stipulations	Times
1	Viktor Krüger defeated Texas Hawk	Texas Bullrope match	10:49
2	August Smisl and Ulf Herman defeated Big Titan and Cannonball Grizzly	Two out of three falls match	—
3	Tony St. Clair defeated Yoshihiro Takayama by disqualification	Shoot Style match	—
4	Fit Finlay (c) defeated Joe-Joe Lee in Round 4	Singles match for the CWA Intercontinental Heavyweight Championship	—
5	Franz Schumann (c) defeated Rick Martel in Round 8	Singles match for the CWA World Middleweight Championship	—
6	Rambo (c) defeated Jim Neidhart in Round 7	Singles match for the CWA World Heavyweight Championship	—
(c) / – the champion(s) heading into the match

=== 1995 (Bremen) ===
Euro Catch Festival (1995 - Bremen)
- Promotion: Catch Wrestling Association
- Date: December 16, 1995
- City: Bremen, Germany
- Venue: Stadthalle Bremen
- Attendance: 5,000

Event chronology
← Previous; 1995 (Graz)	Next → 1996 (Graz)

Euro Catch Festival (1995) was a professional wrestling event held on December 16, 1995, at the Stadthalle Bremen in Bremen, Germany.

Show results

No.	Results	Stipulations
1	2 Cold Scorpio defeated Dan Collins in Round 4	Singles match
2	Ice Train defeated Big Titan in Round 3	Singles match
3	Joe-Joe Lee defeated Rod Price in Round 4	Singles match
4	Kama defeated Viktor Krüger	American Rules match
5	August Smisl and Tony St. Clair defeated Cannonball Grizzly and John Hawk (c)	Two out of three falls match for the CWA World Tag Team Championship
6	Fit Finlay (c) defeated Franz Schumann in Round 7	Singles match for the CWA World Middleweight Championship
7	Keiji Mutoh (with Joe-Joe Lee) defeated Jim Neidhart (with Klaus Kauroff)	Singles match
8	Ludvig Borga defeated Rambo (c) in Round 6	Singles match for the CWA World Heavyweight Championship
(c) / – the champion(s) heading into the match

=== 1996 (Graz) ===
Euro Catch Festival (1996 - Graz)
- Promotion: Catch Wrestling Association
- Date: July 6, 1996
- City: Graz, Austria
- Venue: Eisstadion Liebenau
- Attendance: 4,000

Event chronology
← Previous; 1995 (Bremen)	Next → 1996 (Bremen)

Euro Catch Festival (1996) was a professional wrestling event that took place on July 6, 1996, at the Eisstadion Liebenau in Graz, Austria.

Show results

No.	Results	Stipulations
1	Dan Collins defeated Super-Ninja Nakajima	Singles match
2	Michael Kovac defeated Drew McDonald	Singles match
3	Brian Armstrong and Cannonball Grizzly defeated Tony St. Clair and Ulf Herman	Two out of three falls match for the vacant CWA World Tag Team Championship
4	Franz Schumann defeated Fit Finlay (c) in Round 8	Singles match for the CWA World Middleweight Championship
5	Otto Wanz and Steve Wright defeated Klaus Kauroff and Rene Lasartesse	Two out of three falls match
6	Ludvig Borga (c) defeated August Smisl in Round 6	Singles match for the CWA World Heavyweight Championship
(c) / – the champion(s) heading into the match

=== 1996 (Bremen) ===
Euro Catch Festival (1996 - Bremen)
- Promotion: Catch Wrestling Association
- Date: December 21, 1996
- City: Bremen, Germany
- Venue: Marquee at the Bürgerweide
- Attendance: 2,500

Event chronology
← Previous; 1995 (Graz)	Next → 1997

Euro Catch Festival (1996) was a professional wrestling event which took place on December 21, 1996, at the Marquee at the Bürgerweide in Bremen, Germany.

Show results

No.	Results	Stipulations
1	Michael Kovac defeated Kendo Kashin in Round 4	Singles match for the CWA World Junior Heavyweight Championship
2	Cannonball Grizzly and Wildcat Brookside (c) defeated Tony St. Clair and Mick Tierney	Two out of three falls match for the CWA World Tag Team Championship
3	Franz Schumann (c) defeated Max Le Merchant in Round 5	Singles match for the CWA World Middleweight Championship
4	The Bushwhackers (Butch and Luke) defeated Christian Eckstein and Ulf Herman	Two out of three falls match
5	Fit Finlay (c) defeated Terry Funk by countout in Round 6	Singles match for the CWA Intercontinental Heavyweight Championship
6	Rambo defeated Ludvig Borga (c) in Round 12	Singles match for the CWA World Heavyweight Championship
(c) / – the champion(s) heading into the match

=== 1997 ===
Euro Catch Festival (1997)
- Promotion: Catch Wrestling Association
- Date: July 5, 1997
- City: Graz, Austria
- Venue: Eisstadion Liebenau
- Attendance: 2,800

Event chronology
← Previous; 1996 (Bremen)	Next → 1998

Euro Catch Festival (1997) was the eleventh Euro Catch Festival event produced by Catch Wrestling Association. The event took place on July 5, 1997, at the Eisstadion Liebenau in Graz, Austria.

Show results

No.	Results	Stipulations
1	Michael Kovac defeated Christian Eckstein	Singles match for the vacant CWA World Junior Heavyweight Championship
2	Tony St. Clair and Ulf Herman defeated Robbie Brookside and Mark the Hunter	Two out of three falls match for the vacant CWA World Tag Team Championship
3	Fit Finlay (c) defeated Kevin Logan	Singles match for the CWA Intercontinental Heavyweight Championship
4	Franz Schumann (c) defeated Jose Estrada	Singles match for the CWA World Middleweight Championship
5	Rasta the Voodoo Man (c) won by last eliminating Emmanuel Yarbrough	Sumo Challenge
6	Rambo (c) defeated Duke Droese	Singles match for the CWA World Heavyweight Championship
(c) / – the champion(s) heading into the match

=== 1998 ===
Euro Catch Festival (1998)
- Promotion: Catch Wrestling Association
- Date: December 19, 1998
- City: Bremen, Germany
- Venue: Stadthalle Bremen
- Attendance: 1,000

Event chronology
← Previous; 1997	Next → 1999

Euro Catch Festival (1998) was the twelfth Euro Catch Festival professional wrestling event which took place on December 19, 1998, at the Stadthalle Bremen in Bremen, Germany.

Show results

No.	Results	Stipulations
1	Karsten Kretschmer defeated Super Loco (c) in Round 6	Singles match for the CWA World Junior Heavyweight Championship
2	XL Legend and Rhino Richards (c) defeated Ulf Herman and Rico de Cuba	Two out of three falls match for the CWA World Tag Team Championship
3	Big Tenzan vs. Ice Train ended in a time limit draw in Round 5	Singles match
4	Tony St. Clair defeated Robbie Brookside (c) in Round 5	Singles match for the CWA Intercontinental Heavyweight Championship
5	Franz Schumann (c) defeated Christian Eckstein in Round 4	Singles match for the CWA World Middleweight Championship
6	Rambo defeated Big Titan in Round 6	Singles match for the vacant CWA World Heavyweight Championship
(c) / – the champion(s) heading into the match

=== 1999 ===
Euro Catch Festival (1999)
- Promotion: Catch Wrestling Association
- Date: December 4, 1999
- City: Bremen, Germany
- Venue: Marquee at the Bürgerweide
- Attendance: 1,600

Event chronology
← Previous; 1998	Next → Last

Euro Catch Festival (1999) was the thirteenth and final Euro Catch Festival professional wrestling event produced by Catch Wrestling Association and this was the final event of CWA as the promotion did not hold any more show after the event and closed. The event took place on December 4, 1999, at Marquee at the Bürgerweide in Bremen, Germany. This event marked the only time that the World Heavyweight Championship match did not headline the event but instead a World Middleweight Championship match between Franz Schumann and Jesus Cristobal was the main event of the show and final match of Catch Wrestling Association, which marked the only time that a World Middleweight Championship match headlined the prestigious Euro Catch Festival.

Show results

No.	Results	Stipulations
1	Karsten Kretschmer (c) defeated Butch Bronson	Singles match for the CWA World Junior Heavyweight Championship
2	Black Navy Seal and Ricky Santana defeated Dirk Rotzek and Michael Kovac	Tag team match
3	Big Tiger Steele defeated Ulf Herman	Singles match
4	Tony St. Clair (c) defeated Joe X-Legend	Singles match for the CWA Intercontinental Heavyweight Championship
5	Wildcat Brookside (c) defeated Jason Neidhart	Singles match for the CWA British Commonwealth Championship
6	Rambo (c) defeated Goliath Kurrgan	Singles match for the CWA World Heavyweight Championship
7	Franz Schumann (c) defeated Jesus Cristobal	Singles match for the CWA World Middleweight Championship
(c) / – the champion(s) heading into the match
