= Tony St. Clair =

English professional wrestler

Personal information
- Born: 28 March 1948 (age 78) Bolton, England, United Kingdom

Professional wrestling career
- Ring name: Tony St. Clair
- Billed height: 1.86 m (6 ft 1 in)
- Billed weight: 111 kg (245 lb)
- Trained by: Roy St. Clair; Terry Downes
- Debut: 1966
- Retired: 2006

Tony St. Clair (born 28 March 1948) is an English retired professional wrestler. He is well known for his stints in Joint Promotions and All Star Wrestling in the United Kingdom, Catch Wrestling Association in Austria and Germany, and New Japan Pro-Wrestling. He is also known as a trainer, with his trainees including "Gentleman" Chris Adams and Osamu Nishimura.

== Life and career ==
=== Early life ===
Tony St. Clair was born Anthony St. Clair–Gregory in Bolton, Greater Manchester, England, on 28 March 1948. He grew up on professional wrestling, as his father was Francis Gregory. His older brother, Roy St. Clair, alongside Terry Downes, trained Tony, to follow in his father's footsteps.

=== Joint Promotions (1966–1982) ===
Tony St. Clair made his debut for Joint Promotions in 1966. At the time, he teamed with his brother Roy St. Clair as The Magnificent Saints. When his brother retired in the late 1970s, he moved into singles competition, and in May 1977, he defeated Gwynn Davies to win his first championship, the British Heavyweight Championship. He held the championship for more than a year, until losing it to Giant Haystacks in November 1978. St. Clair would retaliate by regaining the title for the second time, as Giant Haystacks was disqualified. During his second reign as champion, St. Clair transferred to All Star Wrestling with the championship in 1982.

=== All Star Wrestling (1982–2000) ===
In 1982, St. Clair moved from Joint Promotions to All Star Wrestling with the British Heavyweight Championship. During that reign, he would hold the (Mountevans Rules) World Heavyweight Championship between 1982 and 1984, winning from and losing back to Mighty John Quinn. Along the way engaging in several inconclusive unification matches with Wayne Bridges who had won a vacant Joint Promotions splinter claim after Quinn's move to All Star in 1981 and later followed Quinn across to the rival promotion, confronting St. Clair in the ring before a match on S4C's Welsh language wrestling TV show Reslo in 1983.

St. Clair finally lost the British Heavyweight Championship to Kendo Nagasaki after reigning as champion for nearly a decade. He regained the title from Nagasaki later that year. St Clair's British title claim had remained undisputed until 1985 when - three years after his departure - Joint Promotions, with recognition from ITV - set up an alternative version. In 1989, there were plans to unify All Star Wrestling and Joint Promotions' British Heavyweight titles, pitting St. Clair against Dalbir Singh after the latter joined All Star Wrestling, but Singh renounced his claim to the title, making St. Clair the undisputed British Heavyweight Champion once again. He reigned as champion until February 1990, when he lost the title to Fit Finlay. During April and May 1991, St. Clair wrestled on the World Wrestling Federation's tour in England. In May 1993, he won the British Heavyweight Championship for the fourth and final time, but vacated the title in 1995. He remained in All Star until 2000.

=== Catch Wrestling Association (1984–1999) ===
St. Clair made his debut in Germany in 1974. He spent a decade wrestling for various promotions in Germany, until he met Otto Wanz, who offered him a chance to join his promotion Catch Wrestling Association.

St. Clair debuted for Catch Wrestling Association in June 1984, and toured Germany and Austria with the promotion. In December 1984, he became the first CWA Middleweight Champion, but vacated the title the following year. In November 1988, he and Croatian Mile Zrno defeated Fit Finlay and Mark Rocco to become the first CWA World Tag Team Champions. They reigned for nearly a year and a half, before losing the titles to Finlay and Marty Jones. In October 1992, St. Clair was awarded the CWA British Commonwealth Championship, before losing it that night to Jimmy Snuka. He bounced back and regained the British Commonwealth title back from Snuka in December 1992, in which he held for over a year before losing it to Fit Finlay. In July 1994, he teamed with Steve Casey to defeat Finlay and John Hawk to win the vacant CWA World Tag Team Championship. They lost the championship two weeks later to The Wrecking Crew. In August 1994, St. Clair regained the British Commonwealth Championship from Finlay. He reigned as champion for eleven months before losing the title to Franz Schumann in July 1995, although he regained the title later that year. In December 1995, he teamed with August Smisl to defeat Hawk and Cannonball Grizzly to win the CWA World Tag Team Championship, but they vacated the championship two days later when Smisl suffered an injury. In July 1997, he teamed with Ulf Hermann to win his fourth and final CWA World Tag Team Championship, defeating Robbie Brookside and Mark The Hunter to win the vacant championship. They reigned for more than three months, before losing the belts to Jean-Pierre LaFitte and Rhino Richards. In October 1998, St. Clair won the CWA Submission Shootfighting Championship. After reigning three years on his fourth reign as CWA British Commonwealth Champion, he finally lost the title to Robbie Brookside, although he regained the title from him one week later, as well as winning the CWA Intercontinental Heavyweight Championship. The CWA would fold in December 1999 with St. Clair holding three championship at once.

=== New Japan Pro-Wrestling (1979–1995) ===
St. Clair made his Japanese debut in January 1979 for New Japan Pro-Wrestling (NJPW). He would become one of the top gaijin superstars in Japan. Starting out in their junior heavyweight division, St. Clair had a shot at the WWF Junior Heavyweight Championship in May 1985, but lost to champion Hiro Saito. He also participated in the inaugural Top of the Super Juniors tournament in 1988; he placed in ninth place with 14 points. He wrestled for NJPW until 1995.

=== Final years and retirement (1997–2006) ===
In 1997, St. Clair began competing for various promotions throughout Europe, including Verband Der Berufsringer, Independent Wrestling World, European Wrestling Promotion, German Wrestling Alliance, Deutsche Wrestling Allianz, and Professional Wrestling Alliance. In 2001 and 2002, he returned to NJPW as part of Osamu Nishimura's MUGA. In 2001 and 2002, Tony worked as a referee for the World Wrestling All-Stars tours. In 2006, he was planning to join MUGA in August as a wrestler and trainer, but on 5 July he suffered a stroke and had to pull out. Shortly afterward, he retired after 40 years in the business. In 2018 St Clair was inducted into the Hall of Fame at the British Wrestlers Reunion at The Bridges Public House in Kent. St Clair was a special guest at Cheltenham Town Hall on February 19 for World Pro Wrestling at ALL-Star Extravaganza.

== Championships and accomplishments ==
- All Star Wrestling and Joint Promotions
  - British Heavyweight Championship (4 times)
  - World Heavyweight Championship (2 times)
- Catch Wrestling Association
  - CWA British Commonwealth Championship (5 times, inaugural and final)
  - CWA Intercontinental Heavyweight Championship (1 time)
  - CWA World Middleweight Championship (1 time, inaugural)
  - CWA Submission Shootfighting Championship (1 time, final)
  - CWA World Tag Team Championship (4 times) - with Mile Zrno (1), Steve Casey (1), August Smisl (1), Ulf Hermann (1)
