= Luc Poirier =

Canadian professional wrestler (born 1962)

Personal information
- Born: January 9, 1962 (age 64) Montreal, Quebec, Canada

Professional wrestling career
- Ring name(s): Luc Poirier; The Masked Marvel; The Mercenary; La Merveille Masquée; Poirier (Monsieur) Rambo; Rocky Montana; Sniper; Sgt. O'Connors; Jean Le Force
- Billed height: 1.96 m (6 ft 5 in)
- Billed weight: 135 kg (298 lb)
- Billed from: Montreal, Quebec, Canada; South Africa (WWF)
- Trained by: Édouard Carpentier; Louis Laurence
- Debut: 1982
- Retired: December 4, 1999

Luc Poirier (born January 9, 1962) is a Canadian retired professional wrestler. He is best known for his appearances with New Japan Pro-Wrestling (NJPW) and Catch Wrestling Association (CWA) under the ring name Rambo and with the World Wrestling Federation (WWF) under the ring name Sniper. Rambo was pushed as the top star of CWA after the departure of the promotion's owner Otto Wanz and became a major main event star. He headlined the company's flagship event Euro Catch Festival twelve times between 1991 and 1999, every match for the CWA World Heavyweight Championship. He is overall a four-time world champion.

== Early life ==
Before entering the world of professional wrestling, Poirier started training for shot put and discus throw as early as the age of 12 years old. His dedication and athletic abilities allowed him to become Canadian Junior discus champion. Poirier also held the French-Canadian (Province of Quebec) discus record for nearly 30 years.

== Professional wrestling career ==
=== Early career (1982-1986) ===
Poirier was trained by Edouard Carpentier and Louis Laurence. He debuted in 1982. In the early 1980s, he joined the Montreal-based International Wrestling Association as a masked hooded wrestler and was known as " The Masked Marvel". Poirier wrestled as a face until October 1984, when he turned heel and changed his name to "The Mercenary". Shortly after turning heel, Poirier was unmasked by Gino Brito.

In August 1984, Poirier toured Japan for the very first time for the original UWF, under the name "The Lumberjack."

From January 1985 to June 1985, Poirier wrestled at World Wrestling Federation house shows in Eastern Canada as a jobber. He also wrestled several try-out matches on Canadian television, but was not hired by the WWF. During this time, Poirier wrestled on a taping for WWF Superstars against Bret Hart in a scientific masterpiece in which Bret Hart was victorious.

=== Catch Wrestling Association and International promotions (1986–1997) ===
Poirier left Montreal and went on to wrestle in France for French promoter Roger DeLaporte. His first wrestling match on European continent was at the very famous "Elysee Montmartre" in Paris as "Sergeant O'Connors". In the United Kingdom, he wrestled under the name "Jean Le Force". Later, he returned to France as "Rocky Montana", and in Germany, Austria and Japan as "Rambo", he achieved his greatest success under the later ring name in the Catch Wrestling Association. Rambo debuted with the CWA in Hanover, Germany in September 1986 and subsequently joined the International Catch Cup tournament in Bremen, Germany in December 1986, by losing the final to Billy Samson. Poirier's initial success in CWA came when he became the runner-up in the 1987 Catch Cup against Bull Power. He rebounded from the loss by defeating Giant Haystacks to win the 1988 Catch Cup in the following year. He fell to Haystacks in the following year's Catch Cup in the summer, but won the winter tournament by defeating Cannonball Grizzly. After years on the undercard, Poirier was finally pushed to succeed Otto Wanz as the promotion's next superstar after Wanz resigned as the World Heavyweight Champion in 1990 and began receiving success as a main eventer. He defeated former champion Otto Wanz to score an upset win on August 4 to raise his stock.

Poirier became the promotion's top fan favorite and began feuding with Wanz's rival and the promotion's top villain Bull Power. On December 12, 1990, Rambo got his first match for the CWA World Heavyweight Championship, where he competed against Bull Power for the vacant title, which he lost. On July 6, 1991, Rambo defeated Bull Power for his first World Heavyweight Championship in Graz, Austria. Upon his ascent as champion, Poirier made his first successful title defense against Bull Power on August 18 and then defeated Bruiser Mastino on November 11. He headlined the first Euro Catch Festival event on December 21 in Bremen, where he successfully defended his title against Ken Patera. Rambo continued his successful title reign by defeating Terry Funk to retain his title at the second Euro Catch Festival in Graz on July 11, 1992. He then made successful defenses against The Warlord on August 22 and October 18 respectively. Rambo lost the title to Road Warrior Hawk after a year-long reign at the Euro Catch Festival in December.

Rambo regained the title from Road Warrior Hawk at Clash of the Champions on July 3, 1993, to begin his second reign as World Heavyweight Champion. Rambo made his next major defense against famous wrestler Ted DiBiase on August 22. He retained the title against The Barbarian in his fourth straight main event of Euro Catch Festival. He then continued his lengthy reign by retaining the title against Papa Shango at the 1994 Euro Catch Festival in Graz. His next major challenger was Cactus Jack, whom he defeated twice to retain the title in the fall of 1994. Rambo would then retain the title against Big Titan in December's Euro Catch Festival and Jim Neidhart in July's Euro Catch Festival on July 8, 1995.

In mid-1995, Rambo entered a feud with his new challenger Ludvig Borga over the title. Rambo defeated Borga to retain the title in their first meeting on August 20, before dropping the title to Borga at Euro Catch Festival in Bremen on December 16. Rambo regained the title from Borga at the following year's Euro Catch Festival on December 21, 1996, to become a three-time World Heavyweight Champion. His last match in CWA was at Euro Catch Festival on July 5, 1997, where he successfully defended the CWA World Heavyweight Championship against Duke Droese, and then subsequently vacated the title upon his departure. Poirier signed with World Wrestling Federation around that time and quit the CWA to join the WWF.

=== World Wrestling Federation (1997–1998) ===
In 1997, Poirier joined the United States Wrestling Association as "Sniper". Along with Kurrgan the Interrogator, Recon, and Tank, Poirier formed a stable known as The Truth Commission. The Truth Commission was billed as being a group of South African white separatist guerrillas, with their name a reference to the Truth and Reconciliation Commission.

In 1997, The Truth Commission joined the World Wrestling Federation, where they were initially managed by The Commandant. Tank and The Commandant soon left the WWF, and The Commandant was replaced by The Jackyl. Kurrgan went on to compete as a singles wrestler, while Poirier and Recon wrestled as a tag team. At the 1997 Survivor Series in his birthplace in Montreal on November 9, 1997, the four remaining members of The Truth Commission defeated the Disciples of Apocalypse in an eight-man elimination match; Kurrgan was the sole survivor. The stable fragmented after The Jackyl instructed Kurrgan to attack Poirier and Recon after they lost a series of matches. Poirier and Recon took part in a fifteen team tag team battle royal at WrestleMania XIV on March 29, 1998, for the top contendership to the WWF World Tag Team Championship, but were eliminated by Kurrgan, who interfered in the match. Poirier and Recon briefly feuded with Kurrgan and The Jackyl under the name Armageddon before leaving the WWF and returned to CWA.

=== Return to CWA (1998–1999) ===
Poirier returned to Germany after his departure from the WWF in April 1998. He made his return to Catch Wrestling Association at the 1998 Euro Catch Festival, where he defeated Big Titan to win the vacant CWA World Heavyweight Championship, tying Otto Wanz for most reigns with four. He successfully defended the title against former Truth Commission teammate Goliath Kurrgan at the 1999 Euro Catch Festival, which would turn out to be CWA's final event as the promotion closed after the event and Poirier became the final CWA World Heavyweight Champion. He retired from professional wrestling after the closure of CWA.

== Personal life ==
Poirier now lives in Tarpon Springs, Florida. He is retired from wrestling and works as a Critical Care Registered Nurse at Mease Dunedin Hospital. Poirier married Francia Morales on June 30, 2013.

In November 2010, he and British wrestler Dan Collins put on a wrestling show for European Wrestling Promotion in Germany, which led to Rambo's return to the ring in April 2011. Poirier was also inducted to the European Wrestling Hall of Fame.

== Championships and accomplishments ==
- Battlarts
  - BattleArts Tag Team Championship (once) - with Viktor Krüger
- Catch Wrestling Association
  - CWA World Heavyweight Championship (4 times, final)

== See also ==
- The Truth Commission
