= CWA British Commonwealth Championship =

Catch Wrestling Association championships

Details
- Promotion: Catch Wrestling Association
- Date established: October 11, 1992
- Date retired: December 4, 1999
Statistics
- First champion: Tony St. Clair
- Final champion: Tony St. Clair
- Most reigns: Tony St. Clair (5 reigns)
- Longest reign: Tony St. Clair (1,225 days)
- Shortest reign: Tony St. Clair (<1 day)

The CWA British Commonwealth Championship was a secondary singles championship in the German promotion Catch Wrestling Association (CWA). The title was first established as a British-exclusive title and awarded to Englishman Tony St. Clair. The title was deactivated in 1999 when CWA closed. The championship was contested under 10 three-minute rounds.

== Title history ==
=== Key ===
Symbol	Meaning
No.	The overall championship reign
Reign	The reign number for the specific wrestler listed.
Event	The event in which the championship changed hands
N/A	The specific information is not known
—	Used for vacated reigns in order to not count it as an official reign
[Note #]	Indicates that the exact length of the title reign is unknown, with a note providing more details.

=== Reigns ===
#	Wrestler	Reign	Date	Days held	Location	Event	Notes
1	Tony St. Clair	1	October 11, 1992	<1	Hanover, Germany	World Cup	Clair was awarded the title
2	Jimmy Snuka	1	October 11, 1992	63	Hanover, Germany	World Cup	
3	Tony St. Clair	2	December 13, 1992	366	Bremen, Germany	International Catch Cup	
4	Fit Finlay	1	December 14, 1993	242	Bremen, Germany	International Catch Cup	This was a title vs. title match in which Finlay's Intercontinental Heavyweight Championship was also on the line.
5	Tony St. Clair	3	August 13, 1994	346	Vienna, Austria	Catch Cup	
6	Franz Schumann	1	July 25, 1995	11	Vienna, Austria	Catch Cup	
7	Tony St. Clair	4	August 5, 1995	1,225	Vienna, Austria	Catch Cup	Clair was awarded the title to defend against Dan Collins.
8	Robbie Brookside	1	December 12, 1998	7	Bremen, Germany	International Catch Cup	
9	Tony St. Clair	5	December 19, 1998	350	Bremen, Germany	Euro Catch Festival	This match was also for Robbie Brookside's Intercontinental Heavyweight Championship
—	Retired	—	December 4, 1999	—	Bremen, Germany	Euro Catch Festival	The title was vacated and retired due to CWA closing in 1999.

== See also ==
- Professional wrestling in the United Kingdom
