= CWA Submission Shootfighting Championship =

Catch Wrestling Association championships

Details
- Promotion: Catch Wrestling Association
- Date established: September 21, 1997
- Date retired: 1999
Statistics
- First champion(s): Osamu Nishimura
- Final champion(s): Tony St. Clair
- Most reigns: Osamu Nishimura and Tony St. Clair
- Longest reign: Osamu Nishimura (102 days)
- Shortest reign: Tony St. Clair (83 days)

The CWA Submission Shootfighting Championship was a professional wrestling singles championship in the German professional wrestling promotion Catch Wrestling Association (CWA). The championship was contested under 10 three-minute rounds.

== Title history ==
=== Key ===
Symbol	Meaning
No.	The overall championship reign
Reign	The reign number for the specific wrestler listed.
Event	The event in which the championship changed hands
N/A	The specific information is not known
—	Used for vacated reigns in order to not count it as an official reign
[Note #]	Indicates that the exact length of the title reign is unknown, with a note providing more details.

=== Reigns ===
#	Wrestler	Reign	Date	Days held	Location	Event	Notes	Ref.
1	Osamu Nishimura	1	September 21, 1997	102	Hanover, Germany	Catch Cup	Nishimura defeated Robbie Brookside to become the inaugural champion.	
—	Vacated	—	January 1, 1998	—	—	—	Osamu Nishimura vacated the title to compete in Japan.	
2	Tony St. Clair	1	October 10, 1998	83	Hanover, Germany	Catch World Cup	Defeated Franz Schumann to win the vacant title.	
—	Retired	—	January 1, 1999	—	—	—	The title was retired when the promotion closed in 1999.	
