= Maxx Payne =

American professional wrestler (born 1961)

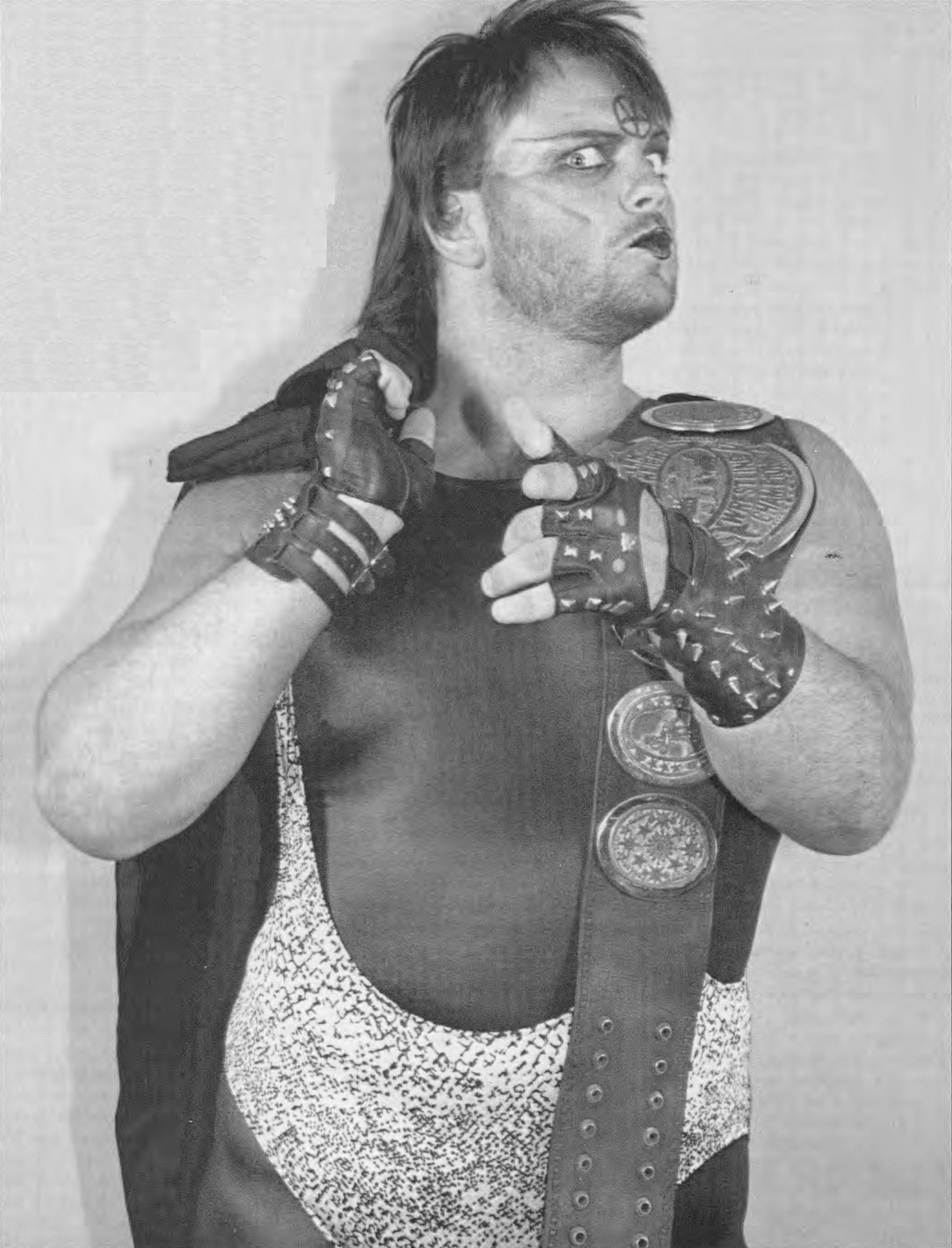
- Peterson c. 1988

Personal information
- Born: Darryl Peterson; October 3, 1961 (age 65) Iowa City, Iowa, U.S.

Professional wrestling career
- Ring name(s): Beater; Blacksmith; Buffalo Peterson; Heavy Metal Buffalo; Lucifer Payne; Man Mountain Rock; Maximum Payne; Max Pain; Max Payne; Maxx Payne
- Billed height: 6 ft 6 in (198 cm)
- Billed weight: 350 lb (159 kg)
- Billed from: "Hell's Kitchen" "The State of Euphoria"
- Trained by: Red Bastien
- Debut: 1987
- Retired: 2003

Darryl Peterson (born October 3, 1961) is an American musician, actor and retired professional wrestler. He is best known for his time in World Championship Wrestling as Maxx Payne, and in the World Wrestling Federation as Man Mountain Rock.

== Early life ==
Peterson became involved in wrestling in grade school when he transferred from football to amateur wrestling as result of a personality clash with the football coach. His amateur career was halted by a motorcycle accident in his junior year of high school. After playing a high school wrestler in the film Take Down with Lorenzo Lamas, Peterson married and had a child. He began working in the construction industry, but decided after two years to return to amateur wrestling.

Peterson earned wrestling scholarships to junior college and then to Iowa State University, competing in the National Collegiate Athletic Association (NCAA). In 1985 he was an All-American, placed fifth in the NCAA competition and also won the Gorriarian award for having the most falls in the least amount of time at the tournament. Every match he won that year at the NCAA's, he won by fall. It was his best and only NCAA finish. Then he relocated to Los Angeles to pursue an acting career. While working as a security guard, he was introduced to professional wrestler Red Bastien by his boss, and decided to train with him.

== Professional wrestling career ==
=== Early career (1987–1993) ===
Peterson worked for the World Wrestling Federation (WWF) in March 1986, and put together the steel cage used in the main event of WrestleMania 2. With his training complete, he debuted in June 1987 and soon after traveled to Japan to work for New Japan Pro-Wrestling (NJPW), where he trained in the New Japan Dojo alongside fellow gaijin Chris Benoit for five months.

In 1988, Peterson developed the character Max Pain (short for "Maximum Pain"), a sinister, grungy, Jimi Hendrix-loving heavy metal guitarist. His original idea was Lucifer Payne, but he felt that this was too foreboding. He used the name Max Payne, hailing from Hell's Kitchen, New York nationally in the United States as well as in Europe and Japan. Following a short stint with the Universal Wrestling Federation (UWF), Pain debuted in the Tennessee-based Continental Wrestling Association (CWA). He quickly began pursuing the CWA Heavyweight Championship, and on February 8, 1988, in Memphis he defeated Jerry Lawler to win the championship. He then went after Lawler's AWA World Heavyweight Championship, but was unable to win the title. He forfeited the CWA Championship to Brickhouse Brown on May 23, but won the title once more on June 27. His second reign ended on July 10 when he was defeated by Phil Hickerson.

Pain left the CWA after a year before returning to Utah, where he opened his own promotion, featuring wrestlers such as Louie Spicolli. He also made an appearance under his real name as a jobber on a February 1989 episode of WWF Prime Time Wrestling, losing to Bret Hart. After his employees began to leave the territory, Peterson applied for a job with WordPerfect. Soon after, he received a phone call from Benoit, who invited him to join an upcoming tour of Germany. Peterson received his plane ticket to Germany half an hour before he received a job offer from WordPerfect, so decided to join the tour. He spent six months in the German Catch Wrestling Association as Heavy Metal Buffalo and won the vacant CWA Intercontinental Heavyweight Championship on October 25, 1992, defeating Giant Haystacks. He then successfully defended the title against The Warlord at Euro Catch Festival on December 19. He vacated the title the following year when he returned to the United States.

=== World Championship Wrestling (1993–1994) ===
World Championship Wrestling (WCW) booker Bill Watts was impressed by Peterson's amateur credentials, and hired him in 1993, with Peterson relocating to Marietta, Georgia. Peterson made his televised debut in WCW as the villain Maxx Payne on the January 30, 1993 episode of Worldwide by defeating local competitor Scott Allen. Peterson's first pay-per-view match was at SuperBrawl III, where he played Taps on his guitar before challenging Dustin Rhodes for the WCW United States Heavyweight Championship, substituting for the injured Ron Simmons. After Rhodes locked him in an abdominal stretch from which he was unable to escape, Payne pushed the referee over rather than submit and was subsequently disqualified.

At the June 17 Clash of the Champions XXIII, Payne shot Johnny B. Badd in the face with a confetti gun, (kayfabe) scarring him so badly that he had to wear a mask and forcing him to forfeit their scheduled match. This led to a match at Beach Blast on July 18, which Payne lost. They faced one another again at the August 18 Clash of the Champions XXIV in a mask versus guitar match, with Payne putting his guitar on the line in order to unmask and therefore humiliate the mutilated Badd. Badd won once more and took Payne's guitar. Badd unmasked willingly to reveal he was fully healed.

Payne took part in WCW's Jesse "The Body" Ventura Strong-Arm Tournament in late 1993, but was eliminated in the first round by Sid Vicious. On November 20, Payne entered the Battlebowl, a tournament which saw randomly assigned tag team partners work together in order to progress to a battle royal. He was partnered with 2 Cold Scorpio, with whom he lost in the first round to Stunning Steve Austin and Ric Flair. Payne later turned face and formed a tag team with Cactus Jack towards the end of the year. At Starrcade 1993 they defeated Tex Slazenger and Shanghai Pierce, and at the January 27, 1994 Clash of the Champions XXVI, they defeated The Nasty Boys. They faced the Nasty Boys once more, this time for the WCW World Tag Team Championships, in a Chicago Street Fight at Spring Stampede 1994, but were defeated.

During his and Jack's feud with The Nasty Boys, Payne had become increasingly unhappy with their stiffness and insistence on controlling the match. During their brawl at SuperBrawl IV, Brian Knobbs and Payne did not cooperate on a fall, and Knobbs broke his shoulder as a result. After the match, WCW President Eric Bischoff shouted at Payne for hurting Knobbs, and Payne responded in kind. As a result, he was subsequently buried. He was fired from WCW soon after, although he did help Jack and his new partner, Kevin Sullivan, defeat The Nasty Boys with a guitar shot.

=== World Wrestling Federation (1995) ===
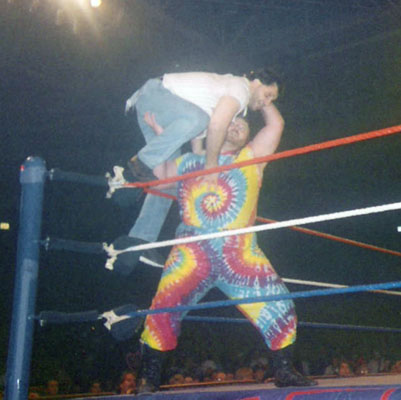
Man Mountain Rock slams The Brooklyn Brawler.

The morning after he was released by WCW, Peterson was contacted by wrestler Rick Rude, who convinced WWF owner Vince McMahon to hire him. Renamed Man Mountain Rock in honor of early-20th century wrestler Man Mountain Dean, his WWF character was considerably more upbeat and less gritty than the popular Maxx Payne character and did not achieve the same success. Debuting in February 1995 on an episode of WWF Superstars of Wrestling, Man Mountain Rock played a large electric guitar shaped like the WWF logo. He frequently stated, "If it's too loud, then you're too old!" In the latter part of his WWF tenure, his music incurred the wrath of veteran Bob Backlund, then playing the part of a cantankerous heel crusading against the younger generation, who objected to the music Man Mountain Rock was playing. Backlund smashing Man Mountain Rock's guitar led to a feud, with both trading victories back and forth on house shows, but Man Mountain Rock was released before they could wrestle on television. Man Mountain Rock had suffered several injuries during his amateur career, and had hoped to secure a backstage position with WCW. When he moved to the WWF, he asked to be made an announcer, but his request was denied. His career in the WWF met with several disruptions, including a serious hernia, an addiction to pain pills and downers and a marijuana habit, which ultimately led to his release in October 1995.

While working for the WWF, Peterson filmed several hours of behind-the-scenes footage with a video camera which he often carried and claimed that he would release a documentary called The Thing that Should Not Be or The Real Maxx Payne based on the footage, but never did. The footage reportedly contained scenes showing substance abuse and solicitation.

=== Later career (1995–2003) ===
After WWF, Payne returned to CWA (Germany) as Buffalo Peterson in 1996. He retired in 2003.

=== Max Payne lawsuit ===
In July 2003, Peterson filed a $10 million lawsuit in the United States district court for Utah against Rockstar Games, 3D Realms, Gathering of Developers, and Remedy Entertainment, accusing them of stealing his ring name Maxx Payne and his neo-noir theme for the protagonist of the video game Max Payne. The case was settled out of court.

=== Retirement ===
On April 17, 2004, Peterson addressed an audience in the Schubert Theater at the Western States College for the Performing Arts in Gooding, Idaho, talking about professional wrestling.

== Film and television appearances ==
- Take Down (1979) as "Ted Yacabobich"
- Touched by an Angel (February 1, 1998) as "Cato"
- A Town Has Turned to Dust (1998) as "Pig Iron"
- Rogue Trip: Vacation 2012 (1998)
- The Substitute 3: Winner Takes All (1999) as "Muscle"
- Touched by an Angel (January 9, 2000) as "Man #2"
- Nobody's Baby (2001) as "Truck Driver"
- Paradise (2004) as "XL"

== Championships and accomplishments ==
- Catch Wrestling Association
  - CWA Intercontinental Heavyweight Championship (1 time)
- Continental Wrestling Association
  - CWA Heavyweight Championship (2 times)
  - CWA Tag Team Championship (2 times) – with Gary Young
- Pro Wrestling Illustrated
  - Ranked No. 73 of the top 500 singles wrestlers in the PWI 500 in 1993
