= Eddy Steinblock =

German professional wrestler

Personal information
- Born: Edwin Steinblock; 16 December 1955 Bremen, West Germany
- Died: 8 November 2017 (aged 61) Bremen, Germany

Professional wrestling career
- Ring name: Eddy Steinblock
- Billed height: 6"7
- Billed weight: 326 lb (148 kg)
- Trained by: Rene Lasartesse
- Debut: 1980

Edwin Steinblock (16 December 1955 – 8 November 2017) was a German professional wrestler, actor and promoter.

== Professional wrestling career ==
Steinblock started his wrestling career in West Germany in 1980, at Catch Wrestling Association where he worked until 1998. During his time as a professional wrestler, he also worked as a movie actor and worked two jobs. He worked as a representative wrestler in Germany's CWA and rose to the level of a veteran, forming a team relationship with Michael Kovac, and famous wrestlers from other countries who visited Germany.

In 1997, he debuted for Verband der Berufsringer where he became the first VdB Schwergates Meisterschaft champion.

Steinblock opened European Professional Wrestling (EPW) in 2004 in Germany. Eddy Steinblock defeated Terry Funk in a tournament in 2004 to win the EPW World Heavyweight Championship to start his 13-year-long reign.

Steinblock booked himself as the main superstar of his promotion, only losing once in a tag team match against the Helsinki Bruisers for the EPW Tag Team Championship and putting himself over against the likes of Terry Funk and Gangrel (wrestler). His last match would be in 2017 in the aforementioned match against the Helsinki Bruisers shortly before his death.

== Death ==
Steinblock died from an unknown illness at 61. At the time of his death he was still EPW World Heavyweight Champion.

== Championships and accomplishments ==
- Verband der Berufsringer
    - VdB Schwergewichtsmeisterschaft Championship (1 time)
- European Wrestling Fighters
    - EWF Heavyweight Championship (1 time)
- European Professional Wrestling
    - EPW World Heavyweight Championship (1 time)
    - EPW Tag Team Championship (2 times) with - Mike Schwarz
