= CWA World Middleweight Championship =

Catch Wrestling Association championships

Details
- Promotion: Catch Wrestling Association
- Date established: December 22, 1984
- Date retired: December 4, 1999
Statistics
- First champion: Tony St. Clair
- Final champion: Franz Schumann
- Most reigns: David Finlay and Franz Schumann (4 reigns)
- Longest reign: Franz Schumann (1,246 days)
- Shortest reign: Barry Horowitz (13 days)

The CWA World Middleweight Championship was a professional wrestling middleweight championship in Catch Wrestling Association (CWA). The title was one of the two weight-based titles in CWA, along with the CWA World Junior Heavyweight Championship, which was introduced in 1993. The title was created in December 1984 and a tournament was set up to determine the inaugural champion. The last previous holder of the European version of the World Middlweight Championship, Adrian Street, had moved to the United States in 1981. Tony St. Clair won the tournament to become the inaugural holder of the new CWA version on December 22, 1984. The title was deactivated when the company closed on December 4, 1999. The championship was contested under 12 three-minute rounds. A rival European version of the World Middleweight championship was promoted in the UK by All Star Wrestling and Rumble Promotions 1991-1996.

== Title history ==
Symbol	Meaning
No.	The overall championship reign
Reign	The reign number for the specific wrestler listed.
Event	The event in which the championship changed hands
N/A	The specific information is not known
—	Used for vacated reigns in order to not count it as an official reign
[Note #]	Indicates that the exact length of the title reign is unknown, with a note providing more details.

#	Wrestler	Reign	Date	Days held	Location	Event	Notes
1	Tony St. Clair	1	December 22, 1984	344	Bremen, Germany	House show	Clair won a tournament to become the inaugural champion.
—	Vacated	—	December 1, 1985	—	—	—	The title was vacated for unknown reasons.
2	Steve Wright	1	December 20, 1985	574	Bremen, Germany	House show	Wright won a tournament.
3	Mile Zrno	1	July 17, 1987	137	Vienna, Austria	House show	
4	Steve Wright	2	December 1, 1987	1,005	Bremen, Germany	House show	
5	Dave Finlay	1	September 1, 1990	27	Vienna, Austria	House show	
6	Steve Wright	3	September 28, 1990	449	Hanover, Germany	House show	
7	Fit Finlay	2	December 21, 1991	203	Bremen, Germany	Euro Catch Festival	
8	Franz Schumann	1	July 11, 1992	161	Graz, Austria	Euro Catch Festival	
—	Vacated	—	December 19, 1992	—	Bremen, Germany	Euro Catch Festival	The title was vacated for unknown reasons.
9	Fit Finlay	3	December 19, 1992	194	Bremen, Germany	Euro Catch Festival	Defeated Eddie Gilbert to win the vacant title.
—	Vacated	—	July 1, 1993	—	—	—	Title was held up after a match against Eddie Gilbert ended in a double disqualification.
10	Franz Schumann	2	July 3, 1993	358	Graz, Austria	Clash of the Champions	Defeated Eddie Gilbert to win the vacant title.
11	Barry Horowitz	1	June 26, 1994	13	Graz, Austria	International Catch Cup	
12	Franz Schumann	3	July 9, 1994	455	Graz, Austria	Euro Catch Festival	
13	Paul Roma	1	October 7, 1995	49	Hanover, Germany	Catch World Cup	
14	Fit Finlay	4	November 25, 1995	224	Bremen, Germany	International Catch Cup	This was a title vs. title match, in which Finlay's Intercontinental Heavyweight Championship was also defended.
15	Franz Schumann	4	July 6, 1996	1,246	Graz, Austria	Euro Catch Festival	
—	Retired	—	December 4, 1999	—	Bremen, Germany	Euro Catch Festival	The title was defended for the last time at the event as it was CWA's final event and the promotion closed after the event.

== Combined reigns ==
Rank	Wrestler	No. of reigns	Combined days
1	Franz Schumann	4	2,220
2	Steve Wright	3	2,028
3	Fit Finlay	4	648
4	Tony St. Clair	1	344
5	Mile Zrno	1	137
6	Paul Roma	1	49
7	Barry Horowitz	1	13
