= VDB =

VDB or VdB may refer to:

== People ==
- Alexander Van der Bellen, President of Austria
- Victor David Brenner, designer of U.S. one-cent coin bearing Abraham Lincoln's image
- Paul Vanden Boeynants, Belgian prime minister
- Frank Vandenbroucke (cyclist)
- Vicente del Bosque, former Spanish footballer and former manager of the Spain national football team
- Donny van de Beek, Dutch footballer playing for Girona FC

== Science and engineering ==
- VDB Catalog, list of reflection nebulae compiled by Sidney van den Bergh
- Video Data Bank, video art distribution service of the Art Institute of Chicago

== Computers and technology ==
- dBase, abbreviated as VdB
- /var/db/pkg, the installed package database in FreeBSD and Gentoo Linux

== Other ==
- VDB, IATA code for Fagernes Airport, Leirin, Norway
- Volksdeutsche Bewegung, a former political party in Luxembourg
- Vrijzinnig Democratische Bond, a Dutch political party
- Verband der Berufsringer, a defunct German professional wrestling promotion
