= Ulf Herman =

German professional wrestler

Personal information
- Born: Ulf Nadrowski; April 4, 1966 (age 60) Hildesheim, West Germany
- Family: Bozilla (daughter)

Professional wrestling career
- Ring name(s): Ulf Ranger; Ulf Herman; Herman the German
- Billed height: 6 ft 6 in (1.98 m)
- Billed weight: 281 lb (127 kg)
- Billed from: Hannover, Germany
- Trained by: Catch Wrestling Association
- Debut: 1989
- Retired: 2012

Ulf Nadrowski (born April 4, 1966) is a German professional wrestler, better known by his ring name Ulf Herman. He is best known in the United States for his appearances in Extreme Championship Wrestling where he was part of The Full Blooded Italians faction from 1998 to 1999. Herman is also known around the world for his time in the European independent circuit, most notably in the United Kingdom for All Star Wrestling, the BWF (including appearances on S4C's Welsh-language Reslo show), Frontier Wrestling Alliance, and more recently 1 Pro Wrestling and Real Quality Wrestling.

== Professional wrestling career ==
=== Early career (1989–1997) ===
Born in Hildesheim, West Germany, Ulf Nadrowski was a local swimming champion in his native country and also did some Judo before he decided to get into wrestling. Herman travelled to Dortmund, Linz, Graz and Vienna, in order to train there. In Vienna he began performing for a small promotion, and he wrestled his first match on August 27, 1989, under the name Ulf Ranger, which he won. In January 1990 he wrestled in South Africa for eight weeks. On 23 January 1992, he was defeated by South African rival Shaun Koen at the Good Hope Centre.

He returned to Germany, working for small promotions, but earned a tryout in the World Wrestling Federation as "Herman the German". He defeated Louie Spiccoli, who later wrestled for the WWF as Rad Radford. Herman then travelled to the United Kingdom, where he gained experience so he could wrestle for the CWA in Vienna. He worked for All Star Wrestling during this time, appearing in backstage footage for Robbie Brookside's Video Diary filmed in 1993 for BBC2, as well as making Welsh TV appearances for S4C's Reslo, where he sometimes appeared as the Hollywood Blond, a Sting impersonator gimmick.

In the last tournament of the year in 1993 in Bremen he was selected as 'Rookie Of The Year' and wrestled but lost a match against Papa Shango, which took place at the Euro Catch Festival. On August 16, 1994, Herman and August Smisl won the CWA Tag Team Championship from Fury and John Hawk (substituting for Rage) in Vienna, Austria. They held the belts for almost three months before dropping them to John Hawk and Cannonball Grizzly in Bremen, Germany.

In 1995 he wrestled The Ultimate Warrior who made a guest-appearance in the CWA for one match. Herman lost the match. On August 16, 1997, Herman was defeated by Marshall Duke in Vienna for the then vacant CWA World Heavyweight Championship. The title was later vacated.

=== Extreme Championship Wrestling (1998–1999) ===
In 1998, Herman travelled to the United States where he competed for Extreme Championship Wrestling. On March 20, 1998, he made his ECW debut in a loss to Doug Furnas. He quickly aligned himself with manager Lance Wright as part of The Wright Connection, a short-lived heel stable of "unofficial" WWF stars, along with Brakkus, Danny Doring, Mike Lozanski, Roadkill and 2 Cold Scorpio. At A Matter of Respect, Herman and The Equalizer served as Danny Doring's cornermen in his match against John Kronus. On June 26, he teamed with Mike Lozansky and Michael Kovac; they lost to the team of Axl Rotten, Balls Mahoney and John Kronus. He faced Kronus in a series of matches on house shows. On August 8, Herman picked up his first victory in ECW by defeating Kronus. On August 28, 1998 Tommy Dreamer, The Blue Meanie and Super Nova beat Jack Victory, Danny Doring and Herman. He and Danny Doring also lost to The Blue World Order (Super Nova and The Blue Meanie) at UltraClash.

Later that year, Herman briefly joined the ECW stable called The Full Blooded Italians. The stable gained a cult following in ECW. While Herman slowly faded away from ECW in the coming months, he still earned various title shots against Rob Van Dam and Sabu, but the matches did not garner any real interest. Nevertheless, Herman would participate in the ECW pay-per-view November to Remember. Herman didn't appear again until January 16, 1999, where, at ECW's House Party, he was defeated again by Kronus. He was among the dozens of challengers who faced Rob Van Dam during his two-year run as ECW World Television Champion. To this day he states that his favourite match was against Van Dam in Detroit, Michigan. Ulf's last match in ECW was against his friend Sabu on January 30, 1999.

=== Return to Europe (2000–2006) ===
After his stint in ECW, Ulf returned to Europe where he captured NWA Germany's heavyweight championship. On September 23, 2000, Hermann defeated visiting American wrestler Bruiser Mastino in Schmedenstedt, Hannover during the ex-WWF star's tour of Germany. Herman continued on the European independent circuit making a name for himself in the United Kingdom once more, competing in Frontier Wrestling Alliance and later 1 Pro Wrestling. On February 9, 2002, Herman took part in one of the FWA's biggest shows, 'Revival', which featured a "European vs. United States" storyline, where he defeated Brian Christopher at the Crystal Palace National Sports Centre. In May 2003 at the Frontiers of Honour show, co-hosted with the American promotion Ring of Honor, Herman teamed with Alex Shane and Nikita to take on The Family (Travell, Brandon Thomas, and Scott Parker) in a mixed hardcore six-man tag team match.

=== 1 Pro Wrestling (2006–2009) ===
On January 6, 2006, Herman made his debut in 1PW, replacing D'Lo Brown who had withdrawn from the event. Herman lost his first match to Sterling James Keenan, but appeared at the end of the show to help Sabu stave off an attack from Keenan and Abyss. The next night, Herman and Sabu teamed to lose to Keenan and Abyss, with Herman being pinned.

Herman was signed up for 1PW's next double-header show 'All or Nothing', winning a dark match on Night One. Prior to the 1PW Heavyweight Title Tournament Final, Herman came out and cut a promo stating that, since he believed A.J. Styles would defeat Abyss in the match, he was challenging 'The Monster' to a 'Survival of the Sickest' match for Night Two. Following the revelation that Christian Cage, the number one contender for the title was unable to compete on Night Two, Herman stepped in as his match with Abyss was made a 1PW Heavyweight Championship match. Herman was defeated, however, after being chokeslammed through a flaming table covered in thumbtacks.

Herman was granted a Falls Count Anywhere rematch at Know Your Enemy Night One. Abyss once again defeated Herman, causing Herman to publicly question his career on Night Two. As he seemed poised to announce his retirement, Iceman interrupted him and attacked, intending to see Herman off into retirement for good. This did not happen, but Herman was defeated by Iceman in a No-DQ match at The Devil's Due.

Herman was unavailable for Invincible due to a personal commitment, but he returned to face both Iceman and Martin Stone in a European Deathmatch. Stone pinned Iceman to win the match and shook hands with Herman after the match, only for Iceman to flip both men off and escape the ring. Herman returned to the Doncaster Dome once more at Fight Club IV: Fight for the Future to team with Steve Corino and new fans' favourite Keenan against the team of Darkside and Team Supreme, Keenan's former followers. The team won the six-man match after Corino hit Darkside with a stiff kick. In the following twenty man 'Fight for the Future' battle royale, Herman garnered the most eliminations but was tossed out by Jodie Fleisch, who came from another arena entrance to blindside Herman.

After 1PW put out a notice of liquidation, northern wrestling promotion 3 Count Wrestling took over 1PW's January 13 booking at the Doncaster Dome to put on the ...Will Not Die show, as a tribute to the fallen promotion, announcing that Iceman and Herman would face off once more in a Survival of the Sickest main event. Following events which led to Abyss being stripped of his second 1PW World Championship, Herman and Iceman battled it out to determine the 'final' 1PW World Heavyweight Champion. After a heated hardcore match, Herman hit a brainbuster/suplex through a flaming table on Iceman to gain the pinfall and become the 1PW World Heavyweight Champion.

Herman managed to retain the belt at 1PW's comeback show Resurrection where he beat Iceman in an "I Quit" match. He also managed to retain over two nights at the Know Your Enemy weekend, on Night 1 in a four-way against Abyss, Sterling James Keenan and Doug Williams and on Night 2 against Sterling James Keenan. Herman managed to again defend his title at the 1PW show Invincible against Sterling James Keenan after the proposed three-way was cancelled due to Abyss not making the show. It was later announced that he would defend his title for the last time against Sterling James Keenan in a steel cage match at the 2nd Anniversary Show on October 13, 2007.

Herman lost the title to Keenan in the cage at 2nd Anniversary Show. Afterwards, Keenan accepted Herman's gesture in handing him the belt, but declared that he would now pillage 1PW for all he could and that he didn't care about the fans or his fellow wrestlers.

Herman defeated Bad Bones, Iceman and The Sandman in a Fatal 4-Way match on April 18, 2009, at The Doncaster Dome.

=== Real Quality Wrestling (2008–present) ===
On February 9, 2008, at ACW's Riptide II event, Herman became the Real Quality Wrestling Heavyweight champion in a title vs title match, putting his ACW Title belt on the line against with the then current RQW champion Martin Stone. He won after a referee mix up spot and rolled his opponent up for the 3 count. Herman made his first RQW title defence on the March 9 RQW TV taping show, where he defeated Johnny Moss.

In 2012, Herman returned to Germany's Professional Wrestling Alliance, where he challenged for the promotion's top title. Herman retired in 2012 and was inducted into Athletik Club Wrestling's Hall of Fame that year. In February 2017 he wrestled a match on the German TV show "Die Beste Show der Welt".

== Personal life ==
Nadrowski has a daughter. She followed his steps into wrestling under the name Bozilla and appeared as part of the main event of Dream Star Fighting Marigold's inaugural event titled Fields Forever. In past times he worked as a lifeguard. Aside from his wrestling career, Nadrowski worked as a bodyguard on tour with bands such as 3 Doors Down, System of a Down, Slipknot and Rammstein. Nadrowski also used to own a fitness club. In 2002, Nadrowski appeared in the television movie Revival: The Search for the King of England.

== Filmography ==
Year	Title	Role	Notes
2000	Was bin ich?	Himself	
2003	Richterin Barbara Salesch	Himself	
2014	Privatdedektive im Einsatz - Carsten Stahl Einsatz in Los Angeles	Himself	
2015	Joko gegen Klaas – Das Duell um die Welt	Himself	
2016-2017	Circus HalliGalli	Himself	
2017	Tatort: Borowski und das dunkle Netz	Gym owner	
2017	Highsociety	Bouncer	
2017-2018	Die beste Show der Welt	Himself	
2018	Mute	Gunther	
2018	Die Spezialisten	Monster	

- Kommisar Marthaler, as Bad Guy
- Marie Brand, as Policeguard

== Championships and accomplishments ==
- 1 Pro Wrestling
  - 1PW World Heavyweight Championship (1 time)
- Athletik Club Wrestling
  - ACW World Wrestling Championship (3 times)
  - ACW Hall of Fame (2012)
- Bullhead City Wrestling
  - Bullhead City Wrestling Championship (1 time)
- Catch Wrestling Association
  - CWA Iron Man Championship (1 time)
  - CWA World Tag Team Championship (4 times) - with August Smisl (2 times), Tony St. Clair (1 time) and Christian Eckstein (1 time)
  - CWA Rookie of the Year (1993)
- European Professional Wrestling
  - EPW Tag Team Championship (2 times) - with karsten kretschmer (1 time), Bernard Van Damme (1 time)
- European Wrestling Fighters
  - EWF Heavyweight Championship (1 time)
- European Wrestling Promotion
  - EWP Iron Man Championship (1 time)
  - EWP Iron Man Hardcore Knockout Tournament winner (2004)
  - EWP Hall of Fame (2012)
- Freestyle Championship Wrestling
  - FCW Heavyweight Championship (1 time)
- Frontier Wrestling Alliance
  - FWA British Tag Team Championship (3 times) - with Drew McDonald (1) and Alex Shane (2)
- German Wrestling Federation
  - GWF Heavyweight Championship (1 time)
- Independent Wrestling World
  - IWW Heavyweight Cup Championship (1 time)
- NWA Germany
  - NWA Germany Heavyweight Championship (1 time)
- Professional Wrestling Alliance
  - PWA Europameisterschaft Championship (1 time)
- Pro Wrestling Illustrated
  - PWI ranked him #326 of the top 500 singles wrestlers in the PWI 500 in 2002
- Real Quality Wrestling
  - RQW Heavyweight Championship (1 time)
