= Franz Schumann =

Austrian professional wrestler

Personal information
- Born: 27 December 1960 (age 65) Linz, Upper Austria, Austria

Professional wrestling career
- Ring name: Franz Schumann
- Billed height: 1.80 m (5 ft 11 in)
- Billed weight: 106 kg (234 lb)
- Trained by: Rene Lasartesse
- Debut: 1985
- Retired: 5 July 2019

Franz Schumann is a retired Austrian professional wrestler, who was well known for his stint in Catch Wrestling Association.

== Professional wrestling career ==
Born on 27 December 1960 in Linz, Austria, Franz Schumann had been a natural athlete, as he had won several national amateur wrestling championships in Austria. After a successful amateur career, he decided to become a professional wrestler, and he was trained by a legendary wrestler from Switzerland named Rene Lasartesse.

Schumann made his wrestling debut in 1985 for Otto Wanz' Catch Wrestling Association, where he would spend much of his career there. He would be solely a singles wrestler, until 1989, when he started getting in tag team matches with Wanz, Dave Taylor, and Steve Wright, among others, as his partners. It was in August 1990, that he won his first championship, the CWA World Tag Team Championship with Mile Zrno, defeating Dave Finlay and Marty Jones. He and Zrno would hold the titles until December 1991, when they lost the titles to Dave Taylor and Chris Benoit.

In February 1991, Schumann wrestled a tour with New Japan Pro-Wrestling, his first time outside of Europe. While in NJPW, he wrestled with the likes of Hiroshi Hase, Osamu Kido, Shinya Hashimoto, and Keiji Mutoh.

After losing the tag team titles, Schumann refocused and became a singles wrestler. In July 1992, he defeated Fit Finlay to win his first CWA World Middleweight Championship. He would vacate the title in December 1992, focusing on his match against Jyushin Thunder Liger, later that month. In July 1993, he regained the CWA Middleweight Championship, defeating Eddie Gilbert in a tournament final. His second reign as Middleweight champion lasted nearly a year, before Barry Horowitz upset him for the title. However, Schumann rebounded and regained the title nearly two weeks later. A year later, he became a double champion, when he defeated Tony St. Clair to win the CWA British Commonwealth Championship. Three months later, he lost the Middlweight title to Paul Roma. By the end of 1995, he also lost the British Commonwealth title back to St. Clair.

In 1996, Schumann returned to NJPW, to participate in the Best of the Super Juniors tournament, which was won by Black Tiger II. He was in 4th place in Block A.

After his Japanese tour, Schumann immediately returned to the CWA. In July 1996, he won his fourth and final CWA World Middleweight title, defeating Fit Finlay. In February 1998, he wrestled in the United States, to challenge Dan Severn for the NWA World Heavyweight Championship. Severn won the match and retained the title.

In April 1999, while wrestling for Otto Wanz and the CWA, Schumann opened up a National Wrestling Alliance territory in Germany, called NWA Germany. As CWA shut down in December 1999, Schumann was free to run his NWA territory full-time in Germany and Austria. He would also wrestle for other German and Austrian promotions as well, making him one of the hardest-working wrestlers in Europe.

However, injuries from his amateur and pro careers were catching up to him, to the point that he couldn't perform at the level he wanted to be. He wrestled his retirement match on October 18, 2002, teaming with Günther Wagner, defeating Aykut Artan and Barish Günay. Upon retiring, Schumann shut down NWA Germany.

In June 2011, Schumann made a one-night return to the ring against fellow former CWA alumnus Karsten Kretschmer, in which he lost via disqualification.

In September 2017, Schumann came out of retirement to wrestle for various independent promotions throughout CWA's former territory in Germany and Austria, until he completely retired on 5 July 2019, when he wrestled Der Söldner to a no contest.

== Retirement ==
In 2008, Schumann started to suffer a series of health problems, including a stroke and his kidneys were failing. He is currently under dialysis to maintain control of his kidneys.

== Championships and accomplishments ==
- Catch Wrestling Association
  - CWA British Commonwealth Championship (1 time)
  - CWA World Middleweight Championship (4 times, final)
  - CWA World Tag Team Championship (1 time) - with Mile Zrno
  - Graz Catch Cup (1997)
- National Wrestling Alliance Germany (NWA Germany)
  - NWA Germany Heavyweight Championship (1 time)
