= CWA World Tag Team Championship (Germany) =

Professional wrestling tag team championship

Details
- Promotion: Catch Wrestling Association
- Date established: November 23, 1988
- Date retired: 2000
Statistics
- First champions: Tony St. Clair and Mile Zrno
- Final champions: Black Navy Seal and Ricky Santana
- Most reigns: Ulf Herman/August Smisl and Mad Bull Buster/Larry Cameron (2 reigns)

The CWA World Tag Team Championship was the tag team professional wrestling title in the German professional wrestling promotion the Catch Wrestling Association. It was established in 1988, and lasted until the promotion's 2000 closing. The championship was contested under two out of three falls.

== Title history ==
Key

Symbol	Meaning
No.	The overall championship reign
Reign	The reign number for the specific wrestler listed.
Event	The event in which the championship changed hands
N/A	The specific information is not known
—	Used for vacated reigns in order to not count it as an official reign
[Note #]	Indicates that the exact length of the title reign is unknown, with a note providing more details.

#	Team	Reign	Date	Days held	Location	Event	Notes	Ref.
1	Tony St. Clair and Mile Zrno	1	November 23, 1988	577	Linz, Austria	House show	Defeated Dave Finlay and Mark Rocco to become the first champions.	
2	Dave Finlay and Marty Jones	1	June 23, 1990	41	Graz, Austria	House show		
3	Franz Schumann and Mile Zrno (2)	1	August 3, 1990	505	Vienna, Austria	World Catch Cup		
4	Chris Benoit and David Taylor	1	December 21, 1991	(Note: The exact date the championship was vacated is uncertain, which means that the championship reign lasted between 163 and 192 days.)	Bremen, Germany	Euro Catch Festival		
-	Vacated	-	June 1992	N/A	N/A	N/A	Vacated when Taylor was injured and Benoit left the promotion to wrestle in New Japan Pro-Wrestling.	
5	Mad Bull Buster and Larry Cameron	1	July 11, 1992	372	Graz, Austria	Euro Catch Festival	Defeated Mile Zrno and Steve Regal in a two out of three falls match to win the vacant title	
6	David Taylor (2) and Mile Zrno (3)	1	July 18, 1993	98	Graz, Austria	Catch Cup		
7	Mad Bull Buster and Larry Cameron	2	October 24, 1993	50	Hanover, Germany	House show		
-	Vacated	-	December 13, 1993	N/A	N/A	N/A	Larry Cameron died on December 13 from injuries suffered in a match occurring two days earlier, during which he collapsed, causing the title to be vacated	
8	Steve Casey and Tony St. Clair (2)	1	July 9, 1994	14	Graz, Austria	Euro Catch Festival	Defeated Dave Finlay and John Hawk to win the vacant title.	
9	The Wrecking Crew (Fury and Rage)	1	July 23, 1994	24	Vienna, Austria	Catch Cup		
10	Ulf Herman and August Smisl	1	August 16, 1994	446	Vienna, Austria	Catch Cup	Defeated John Hawk, substituting for Rage, and Fury to win the vacant title. Rage had injured his arm on August 13 when the top rope broke during a match.	
11	Cannonball Grizzly and John Hawk	1	November 5, 1995	41	Oldenburg, Germany	House show		
12	Tony St. Clair (3) and August Smisl (2)	1	December 16, 1995	2	Bremen, Germany	Euro Catch Festival		
-	Vacated	-	December 18, 1995	N/A	N/A	N/A	Vacated when Smisl was injured.	
13	Brian Armstrong and Cannonball Grizzly (2)	1	July 6, 1996	28	Graz, Austria	Euro Catch Festival	Defeated Tony St. Clair and Ulf Herman to win the vacant title	
14	Ulf Herman (2) and August Smisl (3)	2	August 3, 1996	(Note: The exact date that the championship was vacated is unknown, which means that the championship reign lasted between 1 day and 140 days.)	Vienna, Austria	House show		
-	Vacated	-	1996	N/A	N/A	N/A	Vacated for undocumented reasons.	
15	Wildcat Brookside and Cannonball Grizzly (3)	1	December 21, 1996	(Note: The exact date the championship was vacated is uncertain, which means that the championship reign lasted between 192 and 166 days.)	Bremen, Germany	Euro Catch Festival	Defeated Tony St. Clair and Mick Tierney to win the vacant title.	
-	Vacated	-	July 1997	N/A	N/A	N/A	Vacated for undocumented reasons	
16	Ulf Herman (3) and Tony St. Clair (4)	1	July 5, 1997	98	Graz, Austria	Euro Catch Festival	Defeated Robbie Brookside and Mark the Hunter to win the vacant title.	
17	Jean-Pierre Lafitte and Rhino Richards	1	October 11, 1997	42	Hanover, Germany	House show	Defeated Tony St. Clair and Christian Eckstein, who was substituting Herman.	
18	Christian Eckstein and Ulf Herman (4)	1	November 22, 1997	(Note: The exact date the championship was vacated is uncertain, which means that the championship reign lasted between 313 and 322 days.)	Bremen, Germany	House show		
-	Vacated	-	October 1998	N/A	N/A	N/A	Vacated when Herman left the promotion.	
19	XL Legend and Rhino Richards (2)	1	October 10, 1998	(Note: The exact date that the championship was vacated is uncertain, which means that the championship reign lasted between 1 day and 21 days.)	Hanover, Germany	Catch World Cup	Defeated Rico de Cuba and August Smisl to win the vacant title.	
-	Vacated	-	October 1998	N/A	N/A	N/A	Vacated when Rhino Richards left the promotion after signing with Extreme Championship Wrestling.	
20	Black Navy Seal and Ricky Santana	1	November 27, 1999	(Note: The exact date the championship was vacated is uncertain, which means that the championship reign lasted between 35 and 765 days.)	Bremen, Germany	House show	Defeated Michael Kovac and Dirk Rotzek to win the vacant title.	
-	Retired	-	2000	N/A	N/A	N/A	The CWA closed	
