= Mile Zrno =

Bosnian wrestler

Personal information
- Born: 29 September 1955 (age 70) Suica, Bosnia and Herzegovina

Professional wrestling career
- Ring name(s): Mile Zrno; Silver Hurricane
- Billed height: 1.78 m (5 ft 10 in)
- Billed weight: 106 kg (234 lb)
- Trained by: Rene Lasartesse; Charly Verhulst
- Debut: 1973
- Retired: 7 May 2005

Mile Zrno (born September 29, 1955) is a Bosnian retired professional wrestler, who was well known for his stint in Catch Wrestling Association, various German and Japanese promotions.

== Professional wrestling career ==
Zrno began his professional wrestling career in 1973. He worked in many Germany promotions throughout his career. In 1979, he made his debut in Japan for International Wrestling Enterprise.

In 1981, Zrno made his debut for Catch Wrestling Association in Germany where he worked there until 1993.

From 1982 to 1983, he did another tour for Japan this time for New Japan Pro Wrestling as the Silver Hurricane.

In February 1985, he did his final his tour in Japan for Universal Wrestling Federation (Japan).

On July 17, 1987, Zrno won the CWA World Middleweight Championship defeating Steve Wright in Vienna, Austria. He dropped the title back to Wright on December 2, 1987.

On November 23, 1988, Zrno and Tony St. Clair became the first CWA World Tag Team Champions. They held the titles for over a year until dropping them to Dave Finlay and Marty Jones on June 23, 1990. Zrno teamed up with Franz Schurmann to win back the titles from Finlay and Jones. They held them until December 21, 1991, losing to Chris Benoit and David Taylor. On July 18, 1993 Zrno teamed with David Taylor to defeat Mad Bull Buster and Larry Cameron for the titles. They dropped them back to Buster and Cameron on October 24, 1993.

By the end of 1993, Zrno took a hiatus from wrestling.

In 1997, Zrno returned to the wrestling and Catch Wrestling Association. He made his debut that year for Verband der Berufsringer in Germany. Catch folded in 1999 and Zrno retired from wrestling in 2000.

Zrno, returned for one night wrestling Karsten Kretschmer at Verband der Berufsringer in a no-contest.

== Championships and accomplishments ==
- Catch Wrestling Association
  - CWA World Middleweight Championship
  - CWA World Tag Team Championship (2 times) (3 times) - with Franz Schurmann (1), Tony St. Clair (1), and David Taylor (1)
- Verband der Berufsringer
  - Europameisterschaft Im Mittelgewicht Championship
- International Wrestling Enterprise
  - WWU World Junior Heavyweight Championship
