= Dave Taylor (wrestler) =

English professional wrestler (born 1957)

Personal information
- Born: David Taylor; 1 May 1957 (age 69) Yorkshire, England, UK

Professional wrestling career
- Ring name(s): Dave Taylor; David Taylor; Tim Shea
- Billed height: 6 ft 3 in (191 cm)
- Billed weight: 256 lb (116 kg)
- Billed from: Queensbury, West Yorkshire, England
- Trained by: Eric Taylor; Joe Taylor
- Debut: 1977
- Retired: 2012

David Taylor (born 1 May 1957) is an English retired professional wrestler. He is best known for his weekly appearances on World of Sport and in the United States for his time with World Championship Wrestling from 1995 to 2000 and with World Wrestling Entertainment from 2006 to 2008.

== Professional wrestling career ==
=== Early career (1977–1989) ===
A third-generation wrestler, Taylor was trained by his father Eric Taylor (who held the British Heavy-Middleweight title for the 14 years 1953–1967) and grandfather Joe who competed in Wrestling at the 1932 Summer Olympic Games. His brother Steve was also an established TV wrestler. After winning several awards as an amateur wrestler, Taylor made his professional debut in 1978 under the ring name Dave "Rocky" Taylor.

Taylor made his TV debut in the early 1980s on Reslo, promoter Orig Williams' Welsh language TV wrestling show for S4C. He eventually joined All Star Wrestling in the mid 1980s appearing in the promotion's TV show on cable channel Screensport. He briefly defected to Joint Promotions in 1986, making his national terrestrial TV debut in September that year, losing a tournament semifinal for the vacant British Heavyweight Championship to finalist and former champion Ray Steele, before returning to All Star Wrestling in 1987 when the company gained a share of ITV's wrestling coverage.

In early 1988, Taylor was tangentially involved in the falling out of Kendo Nagasaki and Rollerball Rocco when he and 'Ironfist' Clive Myers faced the duo in a televised contest in Croydon. Taylor was attempting, mid-match, to unmask Nagasaki and had nearly succeeded when Rocco intervened. Rocco attempted to pull the mask back down, but Taylor forearm-smashed Rocco, causing the mask to come off in his hands. As Taylor and Myers celebrated, Kendo fled to the dressing room and returned with another mask. Kendo's manager George Gillette blamed Rocco for the unmasking, igniting a major feud that would run on into the early 1990s.

Taylor defeated Dave Finlay for the All-Star British Heavyweight Championship in King's Lynn on 4 June 1991. He held the title for two years before losing to Tony St. Clair on 4 May 1993 in Croydon. After St. Clair vacated the title in 1995, Taylor entered a tournament for the belt, and defeated Marty Jones in the tournament final in August 1995 in Croydon. His second reign lasted until 1996, when he was defeated by Jones in Croydon.

=== Catch Wrestling Association (1989–1995) ===
In the early 1990s, Taylor began wrestling for the German Catch Wrestling Association. On 21 December 1991 in Bremen, he and Chris Benoit defeated Franz Schumann and Miles Zrno for the CWA World Tag Team Championship. They vacated the titles in June 1992 after Taylor suffered an injury and Benoit left the CWA to compete in New Japan Pro-Wrestling. Taylor won the CWA Tag Team Championship on a second occasion on 18 July 1993, teaming with Mile Zrno to defeat Larry Cameron and Mad Bull Buster. Cameron and Buster regained the titles on 24 October 1993 in Hanover.

=== World Championship Wrestling (1995–2000) ===
In the mid-1990s, Taylor traveled to the United States of America and joined the Atlanta-based World Championship Wrestling promotion. Taylor, renamed Squire David Taylor, formed a stable with Lord Steven Regal and Earl Robert Eaton known as The Blue Bloods. After Eaton (an American) left the group, Taylor and Regal feuded with him. Taylor continued to team with Regal until Regal was fired from WCW in 1998. Taylor would work more singles matches and teamed with Fit Finlay in 1999. Later that year, Regal returned to WCW after being fired from WWF. Taylor and Regal would leave the promotion in 2000 before WCW was bought by the WWF in March 2001.

=== World Wrestling Federation (2001) ===
In 2001, Taylor joined the World Wrestling Federation (WWF), acting as a trainer and wrestler in Ohio Valley Wrestling, a subsidiary of the WWF. Only working one match where he defeated Scott Vick in a dark match for WWF Jakked/Metal on 7 May 2001. He worked for Heartland Wrestling Association where he teamed with WCW alumnus Lash LeRoux. Taylor eventually left the WWF after unhappiness over having to relocate to Cincinnati, Ohio, where the WWF's Heartland Wrestling Association subsidiary was located.

=== Independent circuit (2001–2006) ===
In May 2002, Taylor, William (formerly Steven) Regal and Dave Finlay opened the Atlantan "Blue Bloods Wrestling Academy", a professional wrestling school.

On 7 April 2004 Taylor made an appearance in Total Nonstop Action Wrestling as a mentor/coach of Team Britain during the TNA 2004 America's X-Cup Tournament.

In February 2005, Taylor came back to the UK for three weeks with Brian Dixon's All Star Wrestling, where he responded to some comments made by Drew McDonald.

=== World Wrestling Entertainment (2006–2008) ===
Taylor was hired by World Wrestling Entertainment (WWE) in January 2006 to train wrestling students at Deep South Wrestling (DSW) in McDonough, Georgia. On 23 March 2006, Taylor returned to the ring in DSW to once again team with William Regal.

On 20 October 2006 episode of SmackDown!, Regal announced that Taylor would be joining him on the brand. The two debuted the same night, earning a dominating victory over Scotty 2 Hotty and Funaki. Though the pair reformed their previous tag team, Regal and Taylor would not reuse the Blue Bloods gimmick, instead portraying themselves as sadistic fighters. The team was quickly put into jeopardy in their second match together when Taylor suffered a torn meniscus in his left knee. Taylor took a more relaxed role for a couple of weeks as a corner man for Regal and only wrestled a few short house show matches. Taylor would quickly heal from his injury and the pair went on to feud with Paul London and Brian Kendrick in the hunt for the WWE Tag Team Championship. After defeating London and Kendrick on several occasions, they earned a WWE Tag Team Championship match at Armageddon in December. The match was changed into a fatal-four way ladder match also involving MNM and The Hardys, and London and Kendrick retained their titles. In a subsequent regular tag rematch on SmackDown! Regal and Taylor came up short of winning the titles.

After WrestleMania 23, Regal and Taylor began a feud with Kane when after a match between Kane and Taylor, Taylor and Regal attacked Kane. The Boogeyman soon joined the feud as Kane's tag team partner, but the feud ended after Kane defeated Regal in a singles match. On 25 May edition of SmackDown!, Regal and Taylor competed in a number one contenders match for the WWE Tag Team Championship against Kendrick and London which they lost when Deuce 'n Domino interfered, making both teams the number one contenders. This led to a triple threat match the next week on SmackDown!, where Deuce 'n Domino retained. Taylor and Regal's tag team would come to an end on 17 June when Regal was drafted to Raw during the Supplemental Draft.

Following Regal's departure, Taylor was absent from SmackDown! for several weeks and began teaming with Paul Burchill at house shows and dark matches. Since then, Taylor had only competed on SmackDown! sparingly, competing in a 20-Man Battle Royal for the then-vacant World Heavyweight Championship and losing a match to former rival Kane. Taylor brought Drew McIntyre to SmackDown! in October 2007 and acted as his mentor, but McIntyre would only make a few appearances before moving to the Raw brand in January 2008. Following McIntyre's move, Taylor went on a leave of absence from WWE television. He was released by WWE on 28 April 2008.

=== Later career (2008–2012, 2017, 2019) ===
On 26 and 27 September Taylor took part in the 2008 Ted Petty Invitational held by IWA Mid-South in Joliet, Illinois. He defeated Tracy Smothers in the first round, but lost out to Claudio Castagnoli in the quarter-finals.

From 27 to 29 March 2009, he competed in Chikara's King of Trios Tournament as a member of "Team Uppercut", along with Castagnoli and Bryan Danielson. The team made it all the way to the finals before losing to "F.I.S.T." of Gran Akuma, Icarus and Chuck Taylor.

On 4 April 2009, Taylor lost a fourway match for the HPW Heavyweight Championship against HPW heavyweight champion Vito "the Violator" Toscani, Anthony Zeus and Eddy De La Combe in Eindhoven, the Netherlands.

In March 2010 Taylor received a tryout as an agent for TNA Wrestling.

On 2 April 2011, Taylor appeared at the Ring of Honor pay-per-view Honor Takes Center Stage as the newest member of Prince Nana's The Embassy stable, facing Colt Cabana in a losing effort.

On 9 September 2011, Taylor made his debut for small British promotion New Generation Wrestling (NGW) in a winning effort against Jack Gallagher.

Taylor retired from professional wrestling in 2012. Taylor returned to wrestling for one night only on 23 September 2017 teaming with Franz Schuhmann against Salvatore Bellomo and Big Tiger Steele in a no contest in Bremen, Germany. On 21 December 2019, Taylor returned to Hannover, Germany for European Wrestling Promotion on 21 December 2019 where he fought Ice Train in a no contest.

== Championships and accomplishments ==
- All Star Promotions
  - British Heavyweight Championship (2 times)
- Catch Wrestling Association
  - CWA World Tag Team Championship (2 times) – with Chris Benoit (1), and Miles Zrno (1)
  - Hanover Tournament (2004)
- CWF Mid-Atlantic
  - CWF Mid-Atlantic Heavyweight Championship (1 time)
- Frontier Wrestling Alliance
  - European Heavyweight Championship (1 time)
- Pro Wrestling Illustrated
  - PWI ranked him #214 in the PWI 500 in 2007
