= CWA World Junior Heavyweight Championship =

Catch Wrestling Association championships

Details
- Promotion: Catch Wrestling Association (1993–1999); Athletik Championship Wrestling (1999–2000)
- Date established: July 3, 1993
- Date retired: September 1, 2000
Statistics
- First champion: Hiroyoshi Yamamoto
- Final champion: Eric Schwarz
- Most reigns: Michael Kovac (3 reigns)
- Longest reign: Karsten Kretschmer (567 days)
- Shortest reign: El Locco (7 days)

CWA World Junior Heavyweight Championship was a professional wrestling junior heavyweight world championship in Catch Wrestling Association (CWA). The title was established in 1993 as a weight-class title along with the CWA World Middleweight Championship. Bonecrusher Sileo was crowned the inaugural champion by defeating Lance Storm at Clash of the Champions event on July 3, 1993. The title was defended in CWA until the promotion closed after holding its final event Euro Catch Festival on December 4, 1999. The champion Karsten Kretschmer then began defending the title in the German independent promotion Athletik Championship Wrestling (ACW), where he would lose the title to Eric Schwarz, who would retire the title in September 2000. The championship was contested under 12 three-minute rounds.

== Title history ==
Symbol	Meaning
No.	The overall championship reign
Reign	The reign number for the specific wrestler listed.
Event	The event in which the championship changed hands
N/A	The specific information is not known
—	Used for vacated reigns in order to not count it as an official reign
[Note #]	Indicates that the exact length of the title reign is unknown, with a note providing more details.

#	Wrestler	Reign	Date	Days held	Location	Event	Notes
1	Bonecrusher Sileo	1	July 3, 1993	10	Graz, Austria	Clash of the Champions	Defeated Lance Storm to become the inaugural champion
2	Lance Storm	1	July 24, 1993	69	Vienna, Austria	Catch Cup	
3	Hiroyoshi Yamamoto	2	October 1, 1993	23	(Note: Yamamoto has been recorded as having won the title twice but details are unknown when he defeated Storm for the title.)	(Note: Yamamoto has been recorded as having won the title twice but details are unknown when he defeated Storm for the title.)	
4	Lance Storm	2	October 24, 1993	7	Hanover, Germany	World Cup	
—	Vacated	—	October 31, 1993	—	Hanover, Germany	World Cup	The title was vacated as Lance Storm left the promotion after the event.
5	Michael Kovac	1	June 1, 1996	112	—	—	Kovac was awarded the title.
6	Kendo Kashin	1	September 21, 1996	91	Hanover, Germany	Catch World Cup	
7	Michael Kovac	2	December 21, 1996	196	Bremen, Germany	Euro Catch Festival	
—	Vacated	—	July 5, 1997	—	Graz, Austria	Euro Catch Festival	The title was vacated for unknown reasons.
8	Michael Kovac	3	July 5, 1997	453	Graz, Austria	Euro Catch Festival	Defeated Christian Eckstein to win the vacant title.
—	Vacated	—	October 1, 1998	—	—	—	The title was vacated as Michael Kovac left the promotion.
9	Karsten Kretschmer	1	October 10, 1998	63	Hanover, Germany	Catch World Cup	Defeated Eric Schwarz to win the vacant title.
10	El Locco	1	December 12, 1998	7	Bremen, Germany	International Catch Cup	
11	Karsten Kretschmer	2	December 19, 1998	567	Bremen, Germany	Euro Catch Festival	CWA closed in 1999 and Krestchmer began defending the title in Atlantik Championship Wrestling.
12	Eric Schwarz	1	July 8, 2000	55	Weinheim, Germany	Doomsday II	
—	Retired	—	September 1, 2000	—	—	—	Eric Schwarz retired the title.

== Combined reigns ==
Rank	Wrestler	No. of reigns	Combined days
1	Michael Kovac	3	761
2	Karsten Kretschmer	2	630
3	Kendo Kashin	1	91
4	Lance Storm	3	76
5	Eric Schwarz	1	55
6	Hiroyoshi Yamamoto	2	44
7	Bonecrusher Sileo	1	10
10	El Locco	1	7
