= P. N. News =

American professional wrestler (born 1966)

Personal information
- Born: Paul Neu; July 9, 1966 (age 60) Omaha, Nebraska, U.S.

Professional wrestling career
- Ring name(s): American Avalanche; Avalanche; Cannonball Grizzly; Mighty Avalanche; Paul Neu; Paul the Grizzly; P. N. Neuz; P. N. News; Raging Bull
- Billed height: 6 ft 2 in (188 cm)
- Billed weight: 409 lb (186 kg)
- Billed from: Omaha, Nebraska; Motown
- Trained by: Brad Rheingans
- Debut: January 3, 1987
- Retired: 2016

Paul Neu (born July 9, 1966) is an American professional wrestler. He is perhaps best known for his stints in World Championship Wrestling and Extreme Championship Wrestling under the ring name P. N. News and accompanying hip hop-influenced persona.

== Professional wrestling career ==
=== Early career (1987–1991) ===
After debuting in 1987 and a two-year run in the Don Owen owned, Portland Territory as The Avalanche, Neu traveled to Europe to compete for the Catch Wrestling Association under the ring name Cannonball Grizzly in 1989.

=== World Championship Wrestling (1991–1992) ===
Upon his return to the United States in 1991, Neu joined World Championship Wrestling. He made his debut for the promotion on the May 11 episode of World Wide Wrestling as P. N. News, a rapper gimmick fashioned after P.M. Dawn, where he defeated Terry Bronson in 44 seconds.

He soon began a brief feud against World Television Champion "Stunning" Steve Austin. At The Great American Bash, News and Bobby Eaton defeated Austin and his partner Terry Taylor in a scaffold match. During a house show on June 21, News inadvertently injured Dave Sheldon, who was performing under the ring name the Angel of Death. The injury came about when News botched his Broken Record finishing move during their match, as he splashed Sheldon's knees instead of his torso, which sidelined Sheldon for almost an entire year in order to recover. As a result, News was taken off television, his feud with Austin was dropped, and he was used solely at house shows and sporadically at pay-per-views. Despite this, News faced Austin in a match for the World Television Title at Clash of the Champions XVII on November 19, but was unsuccessful in winning the title. News also twice unsuccessfully challenged WCW World Heavyweight Champion Lex Luger on WCW's December 1991 UK tour, being pinned by Luger in London on December 10 (first night of three shows) and Sheffield on December 13.

After their feud, News was moved down the card and on December 21 at Starrcade, News teamed with Steve Armstrong in a losing effort to Ron Simmons and Thomas Rich. On January 21, 1992, News made his final television appearance, defeating Diamond Dallas Page at Clash of the Champions XVIII. Following this, News wrestled solely on house shows before being released on March 15, 1992.

=== Catch Wrestling Association (1992–1998) ===
After leaving WCW, Neu returned to the Catch Wrestling Association in late 1992 under his Cannonball Grizzly ring name and gimmick. On November 5, 1995, Grizzly and John Hawk defeated August Smisl and Ulf Herman to win the World Tag Team Championship for the first time. On December 16, Grizzly and Hawk lost the titles to Smisl and Tony St. Clair. After the loss, Grizzly began teaming with his cousin Bruiser Mastino, with their tag team being known as The Brotherhood. On July 7, 1996, Grizzly and new tag team partner Jesse James Armstrong won the World Tag Team Title before losing them to August Smisl and Ulf Herman on August 3. After the title was vacated, Grizzly and Wildcat Brookside won the title on December 21 after defeating Tony St. Clair and Mick Tierney in a tournament. They would hold the title until it was vacated in July 1997. On October 10, 1998, Grizzly would then face Brookside to determine who would claim the vacant Intercontinental Heavyweight Championship, but he lost the match via countout. Neu left the promotion in late 1998. two years before its closure and replacement with the European Wrestling Promotion (EWP) for which Neu would return to Europe to work.

=== British wrestling (1993–2016) ===
Neu was also a familiar face in British Wrestling at this time, wrestling for All Star Wrestling as American Avalanche and for Orig Williams' BWF as Raging Bull, including appearances on Williams' Reslo Welsh language TV wrestling show on S4C. Fellow wrestler Robbie Brookside's Video Diary filmed in 1993 for BBC2, includes footage of Neu both in the ring and backstage out of character. Neu, as Avalanche, has continued to make appearances for All Star into the 21st century, often teaming with Joe E Legend as an arrogant American heel tag team, or as part of the World Riot Squad heel faction.

=== Extreme Championship Wrestling (1999) ===
On September 17, 1999, Neu, under his P. N. News ring name and character, debuted in Extreme Championship Wrestling in a losing effort to Spike Dudley. At Re-enter the Sandman in October 1999, News joined Da Baldies, a heel stable composed of wrestlers who were all bald. At November to Remember, Da Baldies (News, Spanish Angel, Tony DeVito and Vito LoGrasso) defeated New Jack and The Hardcore Chair Swingin' Freaks (Axl Rotten and Balls Mahoney) in a handicap match. On November 19, News and LoGrasso lost to The Hardcore Chair Swingin' Freaks in a Loser Leaves Town match, ending Neu's stint in ECW.

=== European Wrestling Promotion (2000–2012) ===
On November 17, 2000, Neu, as Cannonball Grizzly, returned to German/Austrian wrestling and won the EWP's first-ever Hardcore Knockout Tournament after defeating Hercules Harrison in the semi-finals and then Big Tiger Steel in the finals. Ten days later, he won the EWP World Heavyweight Championship after defeating Bam Bam Bigelow. On November 26, 2003, Grizzly lost the World Heavyweight Championship to Thunder. On December 17, 2011, Grizzly defeated Thunder to reclaim the EWP World Heavyweight Title. On October 6, 2012, he defended the World Heavyweight Championship against Fit Finlay, although their match ended in a no contest and thus resulted in Grizzly retaining the World Heavyweight Title.

== Personal life ==
Neu was married to a woman named Connie. He has since married Anja von Stanic, whom he also trained as a professional wrestler in 2007 and managed him while both were members of a stable called The Firm before Anja retired from professional wrestling in 2008.

== Championships and accomplishments ==
- Catch Wrestling Association
  - CWA World Tag Team Championship (3 times) – with John Hawk (1), Jesse James Armstrong (1) and Robbie Brookside (1)
  - Vienna Catch Cup (1998)
- European Professional Wrestling
  - EPW Iron Man Tournament (2004, 2005, 2006)
- Riotgas Wrestling Alliance
  - RWA International Championship (2 times)
- European Wrestling Association
  - EWA World Heavyweight Championship (1 time)
  - EWA Iron Man Championship (5 times)
- European Wrestling Promotion
  - EWP Iron Man Championship (1 time)
  - EWP World Heavyweight Championship (2 times)
- Pacific Northwest Wrestling
  - NWA Pacific Northwest Tag Team Championship (2 times) – with Mike Golden (1) and Buddy Rose (1)
- Professional Wrestling Alliance (Germany)
  - PWA Weltmeisterschaft Championship (1 time)
  - PWA World Cup Championship (1 time)
- Pro Wrestling Illustrated
  - PWI ranked him #86 of the top 500 singles wrestlers in the PWI 500 in 1991
- World Championship Wrestling
  - Rookie of the Year (1991)
- Wrestling Observer Newsletter
  - Worst Worked Match of the Year (1991) with Bobby Eaton vs. Steve Austin and Terry Taylor in a scaffold match at The Great American Bash
  - Nebraska Pro Wrestling Hall of Fame (Class of 2019)
