= Otto Wanz =

Austrian professional wrestler and boxer (1943–2017)

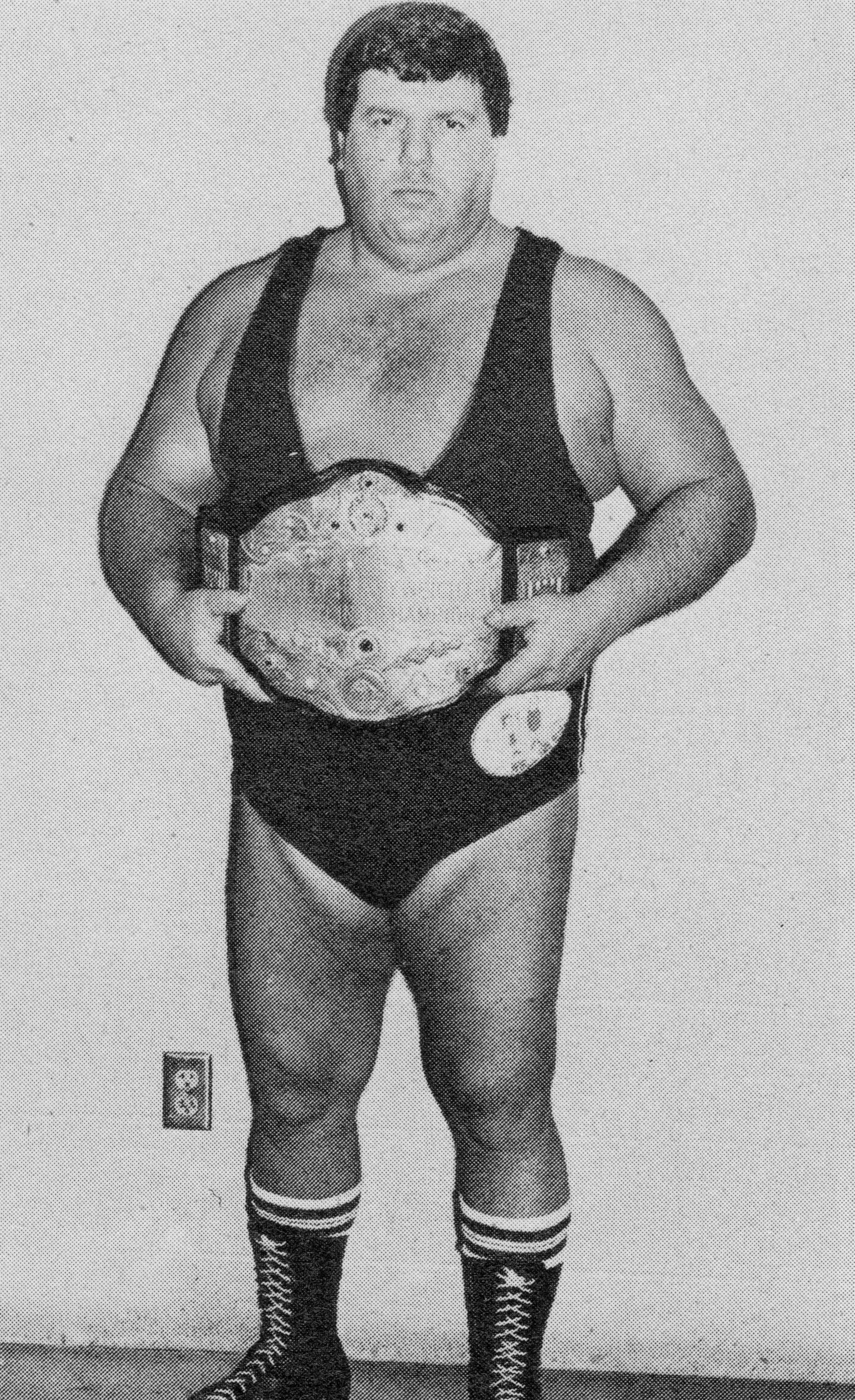
- Wanz posing with the AWA World Heavyweight Championship following his title win

Personal information
- Born: 13 June 1943 Nestelbach bei Graz, Styria, Germany
- Died: 14 September 2017 (aged 74) Styria, Austria

Professional wrestling career
- Ring name(s): Big Otto; Bulldog Otto; Grand Lapin; Otto Wanz
- Billed height: 188 cm (6 ft 2 in)
- Billed weight: 170 kg (375 lb)
- Billed from: Graz, Austria
- Debut: 1968
- Retired: August 23, 1996

Otto Wanz (Austrian German pronunciation: [ˈɔto ˈvants]; 13 June 1943 – 14 September 2017) was an Austrian professional wrestler and boxer. He made his professional wrestling debut in 1968. He is a one time American Wrestling Association champion and former operator of the Catch Wrestling Association, where he was the promotion's inaugural World Heavyweight Champion, winning the title four times. He was overall a five-time world champion and the longest reigning world champion in Europe.

== Professional wrestling career ==
Born in Nestelbach bei Graz on June 13, 1943, Wanz made his professional wrestling debut in 1968 in his native Austria. Later on he would work as "Bulldog" Otto in Japan, primarily working for New Japan Pro-Wrestling (NJPW).

In 1973, he joined the Internationalen Berufsringer Verbandes (IBV) promoted by Nico Selenkowitsch, based in Austria but promoting shows in the surrounding countries as well. On August 2, 1977 Wanz defeated Jan Wilkens on a show in Cape Town, South Africa to become the first holder of the CWA World Heavyweight Championship (originally claimed to be sanctioned by the fictitious Canadian Wrestling Association and having previous lineage in North America). He held the title for a month before losing to Don Leo Jonathan on September 1 in Johannesburg, South Africa. Wanz brought Jonathan to Graz, Austria to win the championship for a second time in front of a home town crowd. Two years later he defeated Johnathan again in a return bout, filmed professionally and one of the earliest of a run of home video releases in Germany and Austria (as an alternative to television coverage such as in the United Kingdom or France.) In Germany, he wrestled numerous top stars of the American circuit including Sgt Slaughter, Brutus Beefcake and Andre the Giant twice in 1987 and was one of the few wrestlers to bodyslam Andre. He also headlined a one-off wrestling broadcast on RTL in 1986, leading a team of Austrians (himself, Klaus Wallas and Franz Schumann) to victory in an elimination six man tag match versus alleged "Americans" Giant Haystacks, Mal Kirk and Mighty John Quinn.

While in the US during a 1982 tour, he worked for Verne Gagne's American Wrestling Association (AWA) where he defeated long-reigning AWA World Heavyweight Champion Nick Bockwinkel to win the AWA title on August 29, 1982. The reign ended 41 days later as Bockwinkel regained the championship on October 9.

Wanz also defended his championship in the UK, defeating Ray Steele at the Royal Albert Hall in London 1984 and Drew McDonald on a 1989 edition of S4C's Welsh language wrestling show Reslo.

Returning to the IBV, which he and Peter Wilhelm bought out from Selenkowitsch and later rebranded as the Catch Wrestling Association (CWA) in honour of its World Heavyweight Championship, Wanz spent several years as the champion until March 22, 1987 where an American power house wrestler known as Bull Power defeated him for the championship. Wanz regained the title a few months later but Bull Power started a second reign in 1989. On June 30, 1990 Wanz won the CWA Championship for a fourth time. Wanz retired from active competition in 1991 to focus on promoting the CWA.

He returned for a few more matches in 1994 and 1996. His last match was on August 23, 1996 when he scored a victory over Terry Funk.

== Personal life ==
Before entering professional wrestling, Wanz was a boxer, winning two Austrian boxing championships. He was also an amateur wrestler. Wanz also organized strong men competitions in Austria. He was listed in the Guinness Book of World Records tearing telephone books. Arnold Schwarzenegger has cited Wanz as an influence on his fitness and bodybuilding career.

Wanz died on September 14, 2017.

== Championships and accomplishments ==
- American Wrestling Association
  - AWA World Heavyweight Championship (1 time)
- Catch Wrestling Association
  - CWA World Heavyweight Championship (4 times)
- Pro Wrestling Illustrated
  - PWI ranked him #135 of the top 500 singles wrestlers of the "PWI Years" in 2003
