= CWA Intercontinental Heavyweight Championship =

Catch Wrestling Association championships

Details
- Promotion: Catch Wrestling Association
- Date established: December 21, 1991
- Date retired: 2000
Statistics
- First champion(s): Bull Power
- Final champion(s): Tony St. Clair
- Most reigns: N/A no repeat champions

The CWA Intercontinental Heavyweight Championship was the secondary singles title in the German professional wrestling promotion the Catch Wrestling Association. The title was active from 1991 through the promotion's close in 2000. The championship was contested under 10 three-minute rounds.

== Title history ==
Key

Symbol	Meaning
No.	The overall championship reign
Reign	The reign number for the specific wrestler listed.
Event	The event in which the championship changed hands
N/A	The specific information is not known
—	Used for vacated reigns in order to not count it as an official reign
[Note #]	Indicates that the exact length of the title reign is unknown, with a note providing more details.

#	Wrestler	Reign	Date	Days held	Location	Event	Notes	Ref.
1	Bull Power	1	December 21, 1991	(Note: The exact date the championship was vacated is uncertain, which means that the reign lasted between 11 and 203 days.)	Bremen, Germany	Euro Catch Festival	Defeated Tatsumi Fujinami to become the first champion.	
-	Vacated	-	1992	N/A	N/A	N/A	Vacated when Bull Power left the promotion for World Championship Wrestling (WCW).	
2	Tatsumi Fujinami	1	July 11, 1992	(Note: The exact date the championship was vacated is uncertain, which means that the reign lasted between 1 day and 171 days.)	Graz, Austria	Euro Catch Festival	Defeated Bob Orton, Jr. to win the vacant title.	
-	Vacated	-	1992	N/A	N/A	N/A	Vacated when Fujinami left the promotion to return to New Japan Pro-Wrestling.	
3	Heavy Metal Buffalo	1	October 25, 1992	(Note: The exact date the championship was vacated is uncertain, which means that the reign lasted between 3 and 186 days.)	Bremen, Germany	House show	Defeated Giant Haystacks to win the vacant title.	
-	Vacated	-	1993	N/A	N/A	N/A	Vacated when Buffalo left the promotion for WCW.	
4	Fit Finlay	1	July 3, 1993	(Note: The exact date the championship was vacated is uncertain, which means that the reign lasted between 1,916 and 1,925 days.)	Graz, Austria	House show	Defeated The Warlord to win the vacant title.	
-	Vacated	-	October 1998	N/A	N/A	N/A	Vacated 1998 when Finlay left the promotion, due to his WCW schedule.	
5	Robbie Brookside	1	October 10, 1998	70	Hanover, Germany	House show	Defeated Cannonball Grizzly to win the vacant title.	
6	Tony St. Clair	1	December 19, 1998	(Note: The exact date the championship was vacated is uncertain, which means that the reign lasted between 378 and 743 days.)	Bremen, Germany	Euro Catch Festival		
-	Retired	-	2000	N/A	N/A	N/A	Title retired when the CWA closed.	

== See also ==
- Catch Wrestling Association
