= CWA World Heavyweight Championship =

Catch Wrestling Association championships

Details
- Promotion: Catch Wrestling Association
- Date established: August 2, 1977
- Date retired: December 4, 1999
Statistics
- First champion: Otto Wanz
- Most reigns: Otto Wanz and Rambo (4 reigns)
- Longest reign: Otto Wanz (3,172 days)
- Shortest reign: Bull Power (111 days)

The CWA World Heavyweight Championship was a professional wrestling world heavyweight championship and the top title of the German professional wrestling promotion Internationalen Berufsringer Verbandes (IBV), later renamed the Catch Wrestling Association (CWA) in the title's honour. The title was created on August 2, 1977 and deactivated on December 4, 1999. The championship was contested under 15 three-minute rounds. It was replaced by the European Wrestling Promotion (EWP) World Heavyweight Championship when that organisation was founded in 2000 to replace the CWA.

It was originally claimed that the championship was sanctioned by a fictitious Canadian Wrestling Association and that it had previous lineage in North America. To this end, Jan Wilkens, a participant in the inaugural August 2, 1977 match, was presented as the defending champion and his opponent Otto Wanz as challenger. The title changed hands in four countries South Africa, Austria, the United States, and Germany and three continents - Africa, Europe, and North America.

Key
No.	Overall reign number
Reign	Reign number for the specific champion
Days	Number of days held

No.	Champion	Championship change			Reign statistics		Notes	Ref.
No.	Champion	Date	Event	Location	Reign	Days	Notes	Ref.
1	Otto Wanz	August 2, 1977	House show	Cape Town, South Africa	1	30	Defeated Jan Wilkens to become the first recognised champion (Wilkens came into the match already claiming to be "Canadian Wrestling Association" champion.)	
2	Don Leo Jonathan	September 1, 1977	House show	Johannesburg, South Africa	1	317		
3	Otto Wanz	July 15, 1978	House show	Graz, Austria	2	3,172		
4	Bull Power	March 22, 1987	House show	Denver, Colorado, United States	1	111		
5	Otto Wanz	July 11, 1987	House show	Graz, Austria	3	772		
6	Bull Power	August 21, 1989	House show	Vienna, Austria	2	123		
7	Otto Wanz	December 22, 1989	Catch Cup	Bremen, Germany	4	190		
—	Vacated	June 30, 1990	—	Graz, Austria	—	—	Championship vacated when Wanz retired.	
8	Bull Power	December 22, 1990	House show	Bremen, Germany	3	196	Defeated Rambo to win the vacant title. Bull Power (Big Ban Vader) also held the IWGP Heavyweight Championship in Japan and the UWA World Heavyweight Championship in Mexico in the same time.	
9	Rambo	July 6, 1991	Catch Cup	Graz, Austria	1	532		
10	Road Warrior Hawk	December 19, 1992	Euro Catch Festival	Bremen, Germany	1	196		
11	Rambo	July 3, 1993	Clash of the Champions	Graz, Austria	2	896		
12	Ludvig Borga	December 16, 1995	Euro Catch Festival	Bremen, Germany	1	371		
13	Rambo	December 21, 1996	Euro Catch Festival	Bremen, Germany	3	196		
—	Vacated	July 5, 1997	—	N/A	—	—	Vacated when Rambo left CWA for the World Wrestling Federation	
14	Marshall Duke	August 16, 1997	Catch Cup	Vienna, Austria	1	442	Defeated Ulf Herman to win the vacant title.	
—	Vacated	November 1, 1998	—	N/A	—	—	Championship vacated for undocumented reasons	
15	Rambo	December 19, 1998	Euro Catch Festival	Bremen, Germany	4	350	Defeated Big Titan to win the vacant title.	
—	Deactivated	December 4, 1999	Euro Catch Festival	Bremen, Germany	—	—	The event marked the last time that the title was defended. CWA closed after the event.	

== Combined reigns ==
Rank	Wrestler	No. of reigns	Combined days
1	Otto Wanz	4	4,184
2	Rambo	4	1,981
3	Marshall Duke	1	442
4	Leon White / Bull Power	3	420
5	Ludvig Borga	1	371
6	Don Leo Jonathan	1	317
7	Road Warrior Hawk	1	196

== See also ==
- Catch Wrestling Association
