= Giant Haystacks =

British professional wrestler (1946–1998)

- Ruane in 1981

Personal information
- Born: Martin Austin Ruane; 10 October 1946 Camberwell, London, England
- Died: 29 November 1998 (aged 52) Prestwich, Greater Manchester, England
- Cause of death: Lymphoma
- Spouse: Rita Boylan (m. 1965)
- Children: 3

Professional wrestling career
- Ring names: Giant Haystacks; Loch Ness; Loch Ness Monster; Luke McMasters
- Billed height: 6 ft 11 in (211 cm)
- Billed weight: 685 lb (311 kg)
- Billed from: Manchester; United States (in Germany/Austria); Scottish Highlands (as Loch Ness)
- Debut: 1967
- Retired: 1996

Martin Austin Ruane (10 October 1946 – 29 November 1998) was a British professional wrestler of Irish parentage, best known by the ring name Giant Haystacks. He was one of the best-known wrestlers on the British wrestling scene in the 1970s and 1980s. He also worked in Canada and the United States under the name Loch Ness Monster or simply Loch Ness.

Ruane was known for his massive physical size, billed as standing 6 ft 11 inch (2.11 m) tall and weighing from 31 stone (430 lb; 200 kg) at the beginning of his career to 48 stone (670 lb; 300 kg) by the end of it; at his heaviest, he weighed 49 stone 13 pounds (699 lb; 317 kg). In the 1970s he formed a heel team with Big Daddy.

After Big Daddy turned face and the team broke up, the two engaged in a long-running, high drawing feud. During his career, Ruane held the European Heavyweight Championship and British Heavyweight Championship in the UK, and won the Stampede International Tag Team Championship in Canada, with the Dynamite Kid.

== Early life ==
Ruane was born in Camberwell, London, on 10 October 1946. He weighed 14 lbs and 6 oz at birth. His father was from Ballyhaunis, County Mayo, Ireland. In 1949, when he was three years old, Ruane and his family moved from London to Broughton in Salford, Lancashire, which remained his home. He attended St. Thomas' School until he left aged 14. He worked as a scraper driver building motorways, and as a nightclub bouncer before a friend suggested he take up wrestling.

== Professional wrestling career ==
Ruane began wrestling in 1967, initially for the independent WFGB as "Luke McMasters", later incorrectly reported as being his legal name. In the early 1970s, Ruane worked for Wrestling Enterprises (of Birkenhead), where he was billed as "Haystacks Calhoun", after the American wrestling star William Calhoun who had wrestled under that name in NWA: All-Star Wrestling and the World Wide Wrestling Federation. Ruane's name was subsequently modified to "Giant Haystacks".

In summer 1975, he moved to Joint Promotions, where he formed a heel tag team with Big Daddy, also a heel at this point. Haystacks' TV debut came in July 1975, when he and Daddy teamed up against the brothers Roy and Tony St. Clair, losing by disqualification. Although mainly known as brutal superheavyweight heels who crushed blue-eye opponents, they also had a major feud with masked fellow heel Kendo Nagasaki.

Daddy in particular heard cheers during this feud and eventually completed a turn to blue-eye. This was cemented when Haystacks and Daddy broke up their tag team in 1977 and feuded with each other, with Haystacks remaining as the heel, resulting in high ratings on Britain's ITV Saturday sports show World of Sport any time they battled one another, and establishing Haystacks as a household name during the 1970s and 1980s.

On television, the feud began when the two reached the finals of a September 1977 four-man knockout tournament, only for Haystacks to walk out in the opening seconds of the final match. A November rematch between the two saw Daddy score a first fall early in Round One, before Haystacks contrived to cause the referee to be crushed between himself and Daddy, resulting in a no contest. Subsequent televised tag matches at Christmas that year and through 1978 mostly resulted in Haystacks abandoning his partner to concede the losing falls to Daddy, although on one occasion in August 1978, Haystacks returned to knock out Daddy's tag partner Gary Wensor for a rare 2–1 victory.

Haystacks was in Mighty John Quinn's corner for his loss to Daddy at Wembley Arena in 1979, and lost to Daddy at the same venue in 1981. From time to time in the 1980s, either man would turn up at the conclusion of the other's televised match to issue a challenge for a further singles bout. The feud continued on and off, generally in tag team matches, until Daddy's retirement in December 1993.

Meanwhile, on 23 November 1978 at the Royal Albert Hall, Haystacks captured the British Heavyweight Championship from Tony St. Clair, by splashing St.Clair in the knees to win by a technical knockout. He lost the title back to St. Clair in April 1979 at the same venue by disqualification.

On 5 February 1991 in an angle at a TV taping for S4C's Reslo show in Machynlleth, Wales, Haystacks issued a challenge to Pat Roach – having just been disqualified in a tag match (later released on VHS on the Wrestling Madness compilation) pitting himself and Drew McDonald against Roach and Robbie Brookside – for Roach's European Heavyweight Championship. Haystacks defeated Roach for the title the following night on 6 February in Llantrisant, Rhondda Cynon Taf Wales but lost it back to Roach later that year.

In late 1991 at Fairfield Hall, Croydon, Haystacks faced Nagasaki in a match – filmed for a BBC2 Arena documentary on Nagasaki – for what was said to be the CWA World Heavyweight Championship, in fact held at the time by Rambo. Haystacks was awarded the match and the championship when Nagasaki, suffering from cracked ribs, withdrew from the match and fled to the dressing room after being unmasked. Haystacks made sporadic defences of his title in 1992–1993.

He and Nagasaki continued their enmity, sometimes in tag matches where Haystacks teamed with lesser superheavyweight Scrubber Daly (Malcolm Hardimann) until Nagasaki's 1993 retirement. At this point manager Lloyd Ryan and Nagasaki impersonator King Kendo took over the feud, lasting until Haystacks's 1996 WCW debut. Prior to receiving his call-up for WCW, Haystacks had been advertised to face King Kendo in a lumberjack match, at the same early 1996 Croydon show as was headlined by a troupe of Michinoku Pro wrestlers in a "triple" (six man) tag match.

Haystacks also wrestled across the world. Ruane wrestled in Calgary, Alberta, Canada for Stu Hart's Stampede Wrestling promotion as the "Loch Ness Monster", managed by J.R. Foley from Wigan, England, alias John Foley, alumnus of Billy Riley's Wigan Snakepit wrestling school. He also wrestled on French TV show New Catch on TF1 in 1988 and Eurosport in 1991 and worked for the CWA in Germany and Austria, winning several trophy tournaments there, as well as in India, South Africa where he feuded with local fan favourite Jan Wilkins and Zimbabwe, where he was made an honorary citizen.

=== World Championship Wrestling (1996) ===
In January 1996, after spending time as a debt-collector in Manchester, selling cars, and undergoing knee surgery, while continuing a schedule of wrestling bookings, Ruane debuted in the United States for World Championship Wrestling, under the ring name "Loch Ness". He served as a member of the Dungeon of Doom who were at that time, feuding with Hulk Hogan. The feud was short-lived, ending abruptly when Ruane was diagnosed with lymphoma and returned to Britain. His last match was against The Giant at WCW Uncensored 1996, where he would lose in a short match.

== Personal life ==
Ruane, a private person, was a devout Catholic and refused to wrestle on Sundays. He claimed to have eaten three pounds of bacon and a dozen eggs every morning to maintain his strength. Ruane married his childhood sweetheart Rita Boylan at the age of 17 in 1965. They had three sons, Martin, Stephen, and Noel. All of them worked in construction.

== Death ==
On 29 November 1998, Ruane died of lymphoma at his home in Prestwich, Greater Manchester. He was 52, and was survived by his wife Rita and three sons.

== Other media ==
Ruane appeared in the films Quest for Fire (1981) and Give My Regards to Broad Street (1984); the latter was written by Paul McCartney, who was a fan of Ruane, and both were later lifelong friends. Roy Jenkins, Queen Elizabeth the Queen Mother, and Frank Sinatra were also fans of Ruane.

In 1990, he appeared on S4C in an episode of the Welsh language soap opera Pobol y Cwm, as himself when he came to the valley for a wrestling match with El Bandito (Orig Williams).

Ruane released a single titled "Baby I Need You" in 1983.

A play by Brian Mitchell and Joseph Nixon, Big Daddy vs Giant Haystacks, was performed at the Brighton Festival Fringe in May 2011.

Manic Street Preachers mention Giant Haystacks in their song "Me and Stephen Hawking" from their ninth studio album, Journal for Plague Lovers (2009).

In late 2021, a Giant Haystacks Retro figure was released by Chella Toys. There was a blue and brown variant for 2022 release.

In February 2022, writer Rob Cope released a memoir Giant Haystacks: My Heavyweight Hero via online publisher lulu.com, detailing his meetings with Haystacks, then in the last months of his life and the story the wrestler had told him of his life and career. The book was released to raise funds for the Christie Cancer Hospital in Manchester.

Archival footage has been used when promoting various WWE events, including a video package during Clash at the Castle: Scotland on 15 June 2024, when William Regal hosted a short video package discussing the history of British wrestling.

== Championships and accomplishments ==
- British Wrestling Federation
  - BWF European Heavyweight Championship (1 time)
- Joint Promotions
  - Joint Promotions British Heavyweight Championship (1 time)
- Stampede Wrestling
  - Stampede International Tag Team Championship (1 time) – with Dynamite Kid
- Wrestling Observer Newsletter
  - Worst Wrestler (1996)
