= Rene Lasartesse =

Swiss professional wrestler (1928–2018)

Rene Lasartesse (January 21, 1928 – December 12, 2018) was a Swiss professional wrestler.

== Biography ==
Lasartesse was born January 21, 1928, in Basel. He began wrestling in 1953 in Germany, before appearing regularly with NWA Capitol Wrestling during the late 1950s and 1960s under the ring name Ludvig van Krupp.

He died on December 12, 2018.
