= Duke Droese =

American professional wrestler (born 1968)

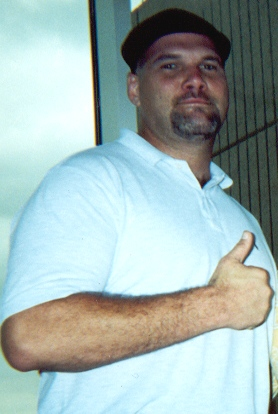
- Droese in 2001

Personal information
- Born: Michael David Droese; August 20, 1968 (age 58) Lodi, California, U.S.
- Education: University of Miami

Professional wrestling career
- Ring name(s): Duke "The Dumpster" Droese; Marshall Duke; Rocco Gibraltar; Garbage Man
- Billed height: 6 ft 6 in (1.98 m)
- Billed weight: 305 lb (138 kg; 21.8 st)
- Billed from: Mount Trashmore, Florida
- Trained by: Bobby Wales
- Debut: February 1990
- Retired: April 25, 2023

Michael David Droese (/ˈdroʊsiː/ DROH-see; born August 20, 1968) is an American former professional wrestler and special education teacher. He is best known for his appearances with the World Wrestling Federation between 1994 and 1996 under the ring name Duke "The Dumpster" Droese.

== Professional wrestling career ==
=== Early career (1990–1994) ===
Droese was trained as a professional wrestler by Bobby Wales. He debuted in Miami, Florida in February 1990, defeating Johnny Blade in his first match. Droese wrestled on the Florida independent circuit throughout the early 1990s. In 1993, Droese wrestled under the name "Garbage Man", which was the inspiration for the gimmick he took the following year in the World Wrestling Federation. Before being signed to the WWF, Droese also wrestled under the ring name Rocco Gibraltar. Droese first came to national wrestling attention in 1993 thanks to Pro Wrestling Illustrated's annual PWI 500 (top 500 wrestlers in the world) where he was placed at #500. Throughout the first part of his tour with the WWE, Droese was accompanied to the ring by many fans chanting "500".

=== World Wrestling Federation (1994–1996) ===
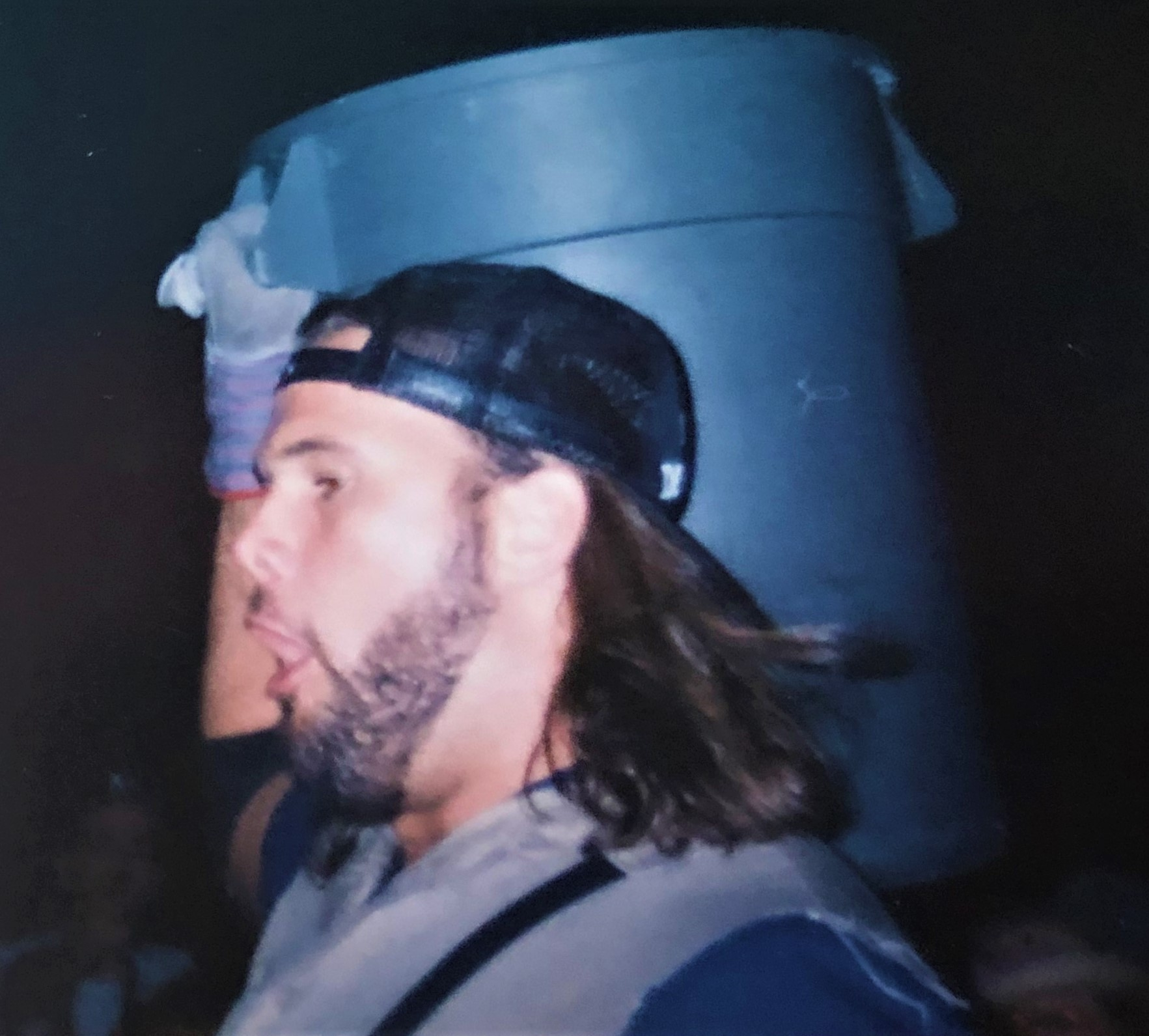
Droese carrying a garbage can to the ring in 1994.

In 1994, Droese was signed to a contract by the World Wrestling Federation. Droese was given the gimmick Duke "The Dumpster" Droese, a garbage man who carried a trash can to the ring. He debuted on Monday Night Raw defeating Barry Horowitz on May 23. In the summer of 1994 as an opponent for color commentator Jerry Lawler. In the course of a confrontation with Lawler, Droese was struck in the head with his own can, one of the first instances of hardcore wrestling on WWF Monday Night Raw. Lawler was obliged to apologize legitimately for "demonstrating such a brutal amount of violence".

Droese took part in the 1995 Royal Rumble and the 1995 King of the Ring but did not win at either event. Later in 1995, Droese began feuding with Hunter Hearst Helmsley. At the 1996 Royal Rumble, Droese handed Helmsley his first WWF loss by disqualification in a match with the stipulation that the winner would enter the Royal Rumble match at number 30, while the loser would be obliged to enter at number one. Despite entering at number 30, Droese failed to win the Royal Rumble, and was eliminated by Diesel and Kama.

The feud between Droese and Helmsley intensified on the January 27, 1996 edition of Superstars, when Helmsley attacked Droese after his match and cut off his hair. The feud culminated in a match that Helmsley won at In Your House 6 on February 18. Droese left the WWF in the summer of 1996, when he and Vince McMahon mutually agreed on a contract release due to the toll that extensive touring was taking on Droese. His final televised match was aired on the July 13, 1996 edition of Superstars, a loss to T.L. Hopper.

=== Later career (1996–2001, 2019-2023) ===
In 1997, Droese appeared with the Germany-based Catch Wrestling Association under the ring name Marshall Duke. On August 16 in Vienna, Austria, Droese defeated Ulf Herman to win the vacant CWA World Heavyweight Championship. The title was later vacated. He defeated Jason Neidhart on January 18, 1998 at Wrestling in Mombasa in Mombasa, Kenya.

On February 16, 1998, he appeared on a dark match for WCW Monday Nitro where he defeated Mick Tierney. Then March 2, 1998, he returned to the WWF, losing to Quebecer Pierre in a dark match on Monday Night Raw. The next night he defeated Paul Diamond on a dark match on Monday Night Raw.

In the late 1990s, Droese began wrestling for Florida Championship Wrestling. In 2000, he won the FCW Heavyweight Championship. Droese went on to form a stable with Drake Dexton, Hack Meyers, and Tony Carlone. Droese and Dexton teamed together as "The Beach Bullies" and competed in the FCW tag team division.

Droese returned to the WWF for a single night on April 1, 2001 at WrestleMania X-Seven, reprising the Duke Droese gimmick in the "gimmick battle royal" eliminated by Doink the Clown, which was won by The Iron Sheik.

Droese returned to the ring as he competed in Chikara’s Infinite Gauntlet match on May 11, 2019, throwing Fireman’s Carry Fray and Snapmare Matt over the top rope before submitting to Armbreaker Amir. On May 15, 2021, Droese defeated Sgt. Ledbetter for the SCW Genesis title. On April 8, 2023, Droese competed in a 40 man battle royal for Major League Wrestling won by Alex Kane.

== Personal life ==
After leaving wrestling, Droese earned a master's degree from the University of Miami. He began working as a special education teacher at Centertown Elementary School in McMinnville, Tennessee where he has also been a strength coach.

Droese's left foot was amputated due to a staphylococcal infection.

=== Legal issues ===
On September 13, 2013, Droese was indicted for three counts of delivery of a controlled substance, having sold oxycodone and buprenorphine to an undercover police informant in July 2013. He was given a three-year sentence, with 30 days to be served in prison, and fined $2,000. He since resigned from his teaching position.

On May 5, 2025, Droese turned himself in to authorities in Warren County, Tennessee after he was accused of attempting to use cryptocurrency to pay for photographs of child sexual abuse on the Dark Web. The transaction was denied by Coinbase, who then tipped off the FBI about Droese's alleged actions. Following an investigation, Droese was charged with one count of attempted sexual exploitation of a minor and booked into the Warren County jail, where his bond was set at $10,000. Droese was later released from custody and scheduled to appear at Warren County Circuit Court in March 2026 for a plea hearing.

== Championships and accomplishments ==
- Pro Wrestling Illustrated
  - Ranked No. 130 of the top 500 singles wrestlers in the PWI 500 in 1995
- Catch Wrestling Association
  - CWA World Heavyweight Championship (1 time)
- Championship Wrestling from Florida
  - NWA Florida Heavyweight Championship (1 time)
- World Wrestling Federation
  - Slammy Award (1 time)
    - Most Smelliest (1994) – Tied with Henry O. Godwinn
- Other titles
  - This Dream House Championship (1 time)
