= Verband der Berufsringer =

Professional wrestling promotion

- Acronym: VDB
- Founded: 1912
- Defunct: 2005
- Style: Professional wrestling
- Headquarters: Berlin, Germany
- Website: Official website

Verband der Berufsringer was a German professional wrestling promotion founded in 1912. It is the oldest known wrestling promotion in the world.

== History ==
For much of the post World War II period, VDB was the dominant professional wrestling promotion in Germany until overtaken by the Austria-based Catch Wrestling Association (originally the IBV) circa the late 1970s. By this point, its dominant star was Axel Dieter (father of current WWE wrestler Ludwig Kaiser.)

VDB's calendar revolved chiefly around multi-night summer tournaments in cities in West Germany and Austria such as Graz, Hamburg and Vienna which were later taken over by the CWA and its successor the EWP.

In response to IBV's programme from 1980 onwards of broadcast-quality multi-camera home video releases, VDB produced lower budget releases on single handheld cameras. Much of this material has since been uploaded to YouTube, often mixed in with IBV/CWA footage.

== See also ==
- List of professional wrestling promotions in Europe
