= Orig Williams =

Welsh wrestler (1931–2009)

- Williams in his wrestling attire

Personal information
- Born: Orig Williams; 20 March 1931 Ysbyty Ifan, Wales
- Died: 12 November 2009 (aged 78) Denbighshire, Wales
- Children: Tara Bethan

Professional wrestling career
- Ring name(s): El Bandito; Orig Williams
- Billed weight: 224 lb (102 kg)
- Debut: 1950
- Retired: 1991

Orig Williams (20 March 1931 – 12 November 2009) was a Welsh professional wrestler and wrestling promoter. Williams spent his wrestling career in the persona of a villainous heel under the ring name "El Bandito", and after retiring as a fighter he became a promoter, manager and television presenter. He is one of the most famous wrestlers to come from Wales.

== Early history ==
Williams was born in the small village of Ysbyty Ifan in north Wales in 1931. He was the son of a local quarryman, and was educated at the local primary school. Williams was accustomed to fighting from a young age, including war evacuees from Liverpool and practising boxing with his village friends. Despite his combative nature, Williams was awarded a place in the local grammar school at nearby Llanrwst.

After leaving school, Williams spent his National Service with the RAF; and on discharge he became a professional footballer. He played for several notable teams around north Wales and the north of England, including Bangor City, Shrewsbury Town, Oldham Athletic and Pwllheli. He later became the player-manager of Welsh team Nantlle Vale, and the club, under his mentoring, became known as a very dirty and overly violent team. Williams himself was one of the worst members of his team, and would often be red carded and sent off for his repeated fouling. After a particularly rough game, he received an injury, which forced his retirement from football.

== Professional wrestling career ==
Before leaving football, Williams had noticed the local crowds dwindling, with one of the major factors being televised wrestling, which was being shown on Saturday afternoons. He took advantage of this new fad, and began working as a wrestler and boxer in fairgrounds; though he nearly lost his job as he could not bring himself to take the hat around the spectators, as he believed it was akin to begging.

By the mid-1960s Williams became the top-billing performer on the independent wrestling circuit. As his career progressed he was invited to fight in India. While in India he wrestled the Bholu Brothers, and on one occasion he was awoken at night by Bholu Pahalwan who told him that the entire troupe was leaving for Pakistan as another promoter was offering more money. Williams went with them, spending another 18 months in Asia. Later in his life, Williams stated that fighting with the Bholu Brothers was the highlight of his career. Other tours saw him take in the Middle East, the Far East, Continental Europe and America. While in America he adopted the wrestling name, "El Bandito", due to his large handlebar moustache.

As a wrestler, Williams played as a heel, the industry term for a villainous character, and enjoyed being physically imposing. He would hurl himself at his opponents and did not hold back his foot stomps on prone combatants. He believed in hard matches, and often quoted the old saying "If you can't stand the heat, get out of the kitchen", during his matches.

== British Wrestling Federation ==
British Wrestling Federation (Orig Williams version)
- Acronym: BWF
- Founded: 1960s
- Defunct: c. 2002
- Style: Professional wrestling
- Headquarters: Rhyl, Wales
- Founder: Orig Williams

Williams was an avid promoter of wrestling bouts and appropriated the name 'British Wrestling Federation' (previously used in the 1960s by a group of promoters led by Paul Lincoln), under which his shows were sometimes held. He also appeared in many of his own bills, stating "No point in wasting money for another wrestler". Despite his hard-man image, Williams was a popular member of the wrestling community, and went on to promote several wrestlers including Adrian Street, "Mighty" John Quinn, Tony St Clair, Mark Rocco and Johnny Saint.

In the 1980s, as a popular showman and a natural Welsh speaker, Williams was offered the job of presenting S4C's wrestling show, Reslo. He continued to compete in the ring on the show albeit as a blue eye. Although ITV had shown wrestling on British television since the 1950s, Williams brought different forms of matches to Welsh audiences, including cage fights, chain matches and pole matches, as well female wrestling. None of these had been done on ITV. Williams also provided an English commentary option in 1991-1992 for Eurosport's New Catch wrestling show filmed in France (a rerun of a first season previously screened on France's TF1 plus a new second season).

In 1990, he also appeared on S4C in an episode of the Welsh-language soap opera Pobol y Cwm, as El Bandito. In the episode he came to the valley for a wrestling match with Giant Haystacks, who also played himself. Williams set up a training gym at his house, and many female wrestlers graduated from his 'Garage' training facility including Tina Starr, Rusty Blair, Carla Sanchez and Bella Ogunlana.

== Later life ==
In his later life Williams became a sports journalist for the Daily Post, and in 1985 he wrote his autobiography Cario'r Ddraig: Stori El Bandito, published in English in 2010 co-authored by broadcaster and journalist Martyn Huw Williams. For his continual promotion of the Welsh language, he was made a member of the Gorsedd of Bards at the 2000 National Eisteddfod at Llanelli.

Williams was a Welsh nationalist, but he believed that the people of Wales should broaden their horizons through travel and self-learning to understand their country's own identity better. He also had a very positive outlook on the abilities of the Welsh, and was disappointed with the negativity of many of his countrymen.

Williams died from a sudden heart attack in 2009, and was survived by his wife Wendy, and daughter Tara Bethan. In 2008, Tara was a finalist in the BBC One television series I'd Do Anything, and mentioned her time being babysat by British wrestling superstars.
