= Robbie Brookside =

English retired professional wrestler (born 1966)

Personal information
- Born: Robert Edward Brooks; 11 March 1966 (age 60) Liverpool, England
- Children: Xia Brookside

Professional wrestling career
- Ring name(s): Robbie Brookside; Robby Brookside; Rob Brookside; Robbie "The Wildcat" Brookside
- Billed height: 6 ft 3 in (1.91 m)
- Billed weight: 241 lb (109 kg)
- Trained by: Liverpool Olympic Wrestling Club; Carl McGrath; Bobby Barron
- Debut: October 22, 1981
- Retired: 2013

Robert Edward Brooks (born 11 March 1966), better known by his ring name Robbie Brookside, is an English retired professional wrestler. He is signed to WWE, where he works as a trainer/producer for the NXT brand. He has toured all over the world during his career, wrestling in the United States, Japan, Germany, and Mexico. He was a regular tag partner of Steve Regal in the United Kingdom and has competed in the New Japan Pro-Wrestling's annual tournament, the Super J Cup, in 1997, where he picked up a victory over Chris Jericho.

== Professional wrestling career ==
Brooks was discovered by Bobby Barron, who invited him to wrestle at the Pleasure Beach in Blackpool, and Brian Dixon, who got Brooks some jobs on the holiday camps with established wrestlers such as Sandy Scott. Wrestling as Robbie Brookside (a name given to him by Dixon, in reference to the Channel 4 soap Brookside), he first appeared on television in Britain for All Star Wrestling, first for Screensport in 1985-1986 and then for ITV in 1987–1988. During this period, he tag-teamed regularly with Steve Regal as The Golden Boys. Their most notable match was against Kendo Nagasaki and "Blondie" Barrett at a late 1988 TV taping in Bedworth in which Brookside unmasked Nagasaki who retaliated by hypnotizing Brookside to turn on Regal, causing their team to lose the match. This started an angle, running on after the end of TV and into the 1990s in which Nagasaki would hypnotize Brookside into assisting and even tag partnering him. Throughout the late 1980s and early 1990s Brookside also regularly wrestled on Orig Williams' Welsh language wrestling show Reslo on S4C.

Brookside won his first title after World Heavy-Middleweight Champion "Rollerball" Mark Rocco retired and Brookside won the vacant title in a tournament. The following year, he lost it to Frank "Chic" Cullen. After Regal increasingly began wrestling overseas, Brookside then teamed with Doc Dean as The Liverpool Lads, together winning the British Tag Team Championship. During this period, Brookside produced a Video Diary for BBC2 including footage inside the ring (including the Liverpool Lads' 21 January 1993 tag title loss to Steve Prince and Vic Powers in Norwich) and backstage footage, as well as a tour of Germany and a visit to the United States to reunite with Regal, by then working for WCW. Frankie Sloan later teamed with Brookside as The Liverpool Lads in place of Dean. In 1996, Brookside got the chance to wrestle in Germany for the Catch Wrestling Association through his contact with the group, Dave "Fit" Finlay. From then through to the turn of the century, Brookside could be found wrestling across many promotions in Europe and won many titles during his travels.

Brookside spent six months in the U.S. wrestling for World Championship Wrestling, including several matches on Nitro, WCW's main TV shown worldwide. On 25 April 2005, he had a dark match on World Wrestling Entertainment's Raw during a taping of the show in the UK, losing to Simon Dean. When WWE once again returned to England, Brookside joined other British wrestlers Thunder and Steve Lewington as part of the WWE security squad that helped keep the warring Raw and SmackDown! wrestlers apart.

Brookside continued to wrestle in and around the UK and remained one of the top British wrestlers, winning many of the top titles in the UK. Brookside became the first-ever Real Quality Wrestling Heavyweight Champion on 29 April 2006, defeating former WWE and WCW Superstar Billy Kidman during a match at RQW's A Night of Champions event. Brookside would later go on to win the Frontier Wrestling Alliance's British Heavyweight Championship at the FWA Summer Classic in a no-DQ elimination three-way match, finally pinning Jonny Storm after then-champion Hade Vansen, who was eliminated first, returned to the ring and hit Storm with his South City Driller finishing move.

Though FWA Champion, Brookside was in fact wrestling under the banner of another promotion, All Star Wrestling. Brookside remained an All-Star wrestler throughout his reign, with various FWA wrestlers trying to take back "their" championship. During this time, Brookside vacated his RQW Heavyweight title and left the promotion. Brookside also took an interest in the future of the business by going on to train future wrestlers, eventually opening his own Leicester-based wrestling school, Wrestleicester, in late 2006.

Brookside appeared on the 23 April 2007 episode of Raw, losing a no disqualification, 3-on-1 handicap match to Shane McMahon, Vince McMahon, and Umaga. Brookside was introduced as a man that Shane McMahon had personally seen take down six men by himself in a fight at a local pub. Brookside has also had WWE matches against Snitsky and Maven. Brookside wrestled around the country in 2008, including defeating James Mason in a World of Sport rules match at Maesteg Town Hall.

In February 2008, Brookside won All Star Wrestling British Heavyweight Championship for the second time but was forced to vacate the title in May 2009 due to injury. At a WWE house show in Birmingham on 7 November 2011, William Regal announced that Brookside was in the crowd and credited him with his success as well as that of Sheamus and Wade Barrett.

In 2013, Brookside, who had already been working as a talent scout for WWE, began working as a coach in WWE's developmental system, NXT, also ending his career in the active competition after nearly 30 years. Brookside made an appearance on the 16 February 2015 episode of Raw, separating a brawl between Daniel Bryan and Roman Reigns.

According to Pro Wrestling Torch in 2017, Brookside teaches the beginner class at the WWE Performance Center, the first of four levels of classes.

== Personal life ==
Brooks daughter Xia-Louise is also a wrestler, best known as Xia Brookside.

Brooks is a supporter of Everton Football Club.

== Championships and accomplishments ==
- All Star Wrestling
  - ASW British Heavyweight Championship (2 times)
  - ASW British Tag Team Championship (2 times) – with Doc Dean
  - ASW World Heavy-Middleweight Championship (1 time)
- Catch Wrestling Association
  - CWA World Tag Team Championship (1 time) – with Cannonball Grizzly
- European Wrestling Promotion
  - EWP Intercontinental Championship (2 times)
- Frontier Wrestling Alliance
  - FWA British Heavyweight Championship (1 time)
- New Alliance of Wrestling Athletes
  - NAWA Heavyweight Championship (1 time)
- Premier Wrestling Federation
  - Ken Joyce Trophy (2004, 2006, 2009)
- Professional Wrestling Alliance
  - PWA European Championship (2 times)
- Real Quality Wrestling
  - RQW Heavyweight Championship (1 time)
- The Wrestling Alliance
  - TWA British Heavyweight Champion (2 times)
  - TWA British Tag Team Championship (1 time) – with Doug Williams (1)
  - TWA Hardcore Championship (1 time)
- Westside Xtreme Wrestling
  - wXw World Heavyweight Championship (1 time)
  - wXw Hall of Fame (Class of 2019)
