= Joe Cornelius =

British professional wrestler and actor (1928–2021)

Personal information
- Born: Joseph Cornelius; May 1, 1928 London, England
- Died: October 30, 2021 (aged 93) United Kingdom, England
- Occupations: Professional wrestler; Actor; Stunt performer
- Spouse: Antoniette Roma (m. 1972)
- Children: Jane Cornelius (daughter)
- Relative: Billy Cornelius (brother)

Professional wrestling career
- Ring name(s): "The Dazzler" Joe Cornelius; The Cockney Cavalier; Southern England Heavyweight Championship
- Billed height: 6 ft 0 in (183 cm)
- Billed weight: 210 lb (95 kg)
- Billed from: London, England
- Trained by: Tony Mancelli; Joe D'Orazio
- Debut: 1952
- Retired: 1967

Joe Cornelius (1 May 1928 – 30 October 2021), known by his ring name "Dazzler" Joe Cornelius, was a British professional wrestler, actor, and stunt performer. He held the Southern England Heavyweight Championship and famously retired in 1967 as the undefeated champion. A popular heavyweight in post-war British wrestling, he became a household name through frequent television appearances and his flamboyant showmanship. Outside the ring, he achieved cult cinematic fame for portraying the titular prehistoric creature in the 1970 horror film Trog.

== Early life ==
Cornelius was born on 1 May 1928 in London, England. Before entering the entertainment world, he worked as a maintenance engineer for the Daily Mirror, maintaining the newspaper's printing presses. He was encouraged to pursue wrestling by friends and mentors Tony Mancelli and Joe D'Orazio.

== Career ==
=== Wrestling career ===
Cornelius made his professional debut in Germany, serving as a last-minute substitute for an injured Joe D'Orazio. Known for his trademark black tights and gold-sequined capes, he earned the nickname "Dazzler" for his striking appearance and charismatic ring presence. He was a mainstay for the London-based Dale Martin Promotions and frequently headlined at prestigious venues like the Royal Albert Hall and the Wimbledon Palais. His signature move was a spectacular long-distance flying headbutt. Cornelius held the Southern England Heavyweight Championship until his retirement from active competition in 1967.

=== Acting and stunt career ===
As his wrestling career wound down, Cornelius's physical presence led him into film and television. He is most remembered for his role in the 1970 film Trog, where he played a primitive caveman opposite Joan Crawford.

In Trog, Cornelius played a primitive caveman discovered in the English countryside. The role required him to wear a "ratty ape-suit"—reportedly a leftover from Stanley Kubrick's 2001: A Space Odyssey. Despite the film's reputation as a "B-movie," Cornelius spoke warmly of his co-star, Joan Crawford.

== Personal life ==
Cornelius was a multifaceted businessman who operated a hairdressing salon throughout his wrestling and acting years. After retiring from the ring, he managed several pubs, including the Albion Pub in Pimlico and the Turners Arms, which served as the original home for the British Wrestlers Reunion. He married Antoniette Roma in October 1972. He eventually retired to Cyprus but returned to England for his final years. He was the older brother of actor and stuntman Billy Cornelius, known for his work in the Carry On series. In 1984, Joe published his autobiography, Thumbs Up: The Amazing Story of a Wrestler's Life, which detailed his global matches and personal antics with "warts and all" honesty. He became friends with Joan Crawford. The two formed an unlikely and lasting friendship; Crawford was impressed by his professionalism and kindness, and the pair exchanged Christmas cards for years until her death in 1977.

== Death ==
Cornelius died on 30 October 2021 at the age of 93. His daughter, Jane Cornelius, stated he died peacefully after having lived with dementia for several years.

== Filmography ==
=== Television ===
Year	Title	Role	Notes
1964	Ring-a-Ding-Ding!	Himself	1 episode
1964–1985	World of Sport	Himself	2 episodes
1966	Adam Adamant Lives!	Chauffeur	Episode: "D is for Dangerous"
1968	Hold On: It's the Dave Clark Five	Self	TV Movie
1968	Softly, Softly	Tobin	Episode: "The Collector"
1968–1969	The Avengers	Karate Opponent / Goon	2 episodes
1970	The Wednesday Play	Prison Guard	Episode: "The Cellar and the Almond Tree"
1970	The Befrienders	Maxwell	TV Movie
1974	Boy Dominic	Prize Fighter	Episode: "The Great Day"
1976	The New Avengers	Burly Henchman	Episode: "Target!"

=== Film ===
Year	Title	Role	Notes
1966	Khartoum	Muscular Man	Stunts
1967	Casino Royale	Cowboy	Stunts
1967	The Magnificent Two	Man	
1967	The Dirty Dozen	American Officer	
1967	The Sorcerers	Taxi Driver	
1968	Oliver!	Man in crowd	
1969	The File of the Golden Goose	Gordie	
1970	Trog	Trog	Titular role
1970	Carry On Loving	Boxing Second	

== Bibliography ==
- Cornelius, Joe (1984). Thumbs Up: The Amazing Story of a Wrestler's Life. W.H. Allen / Star Books. ISBN 978-0352315199.

== See also ==
- Professional wrestling in the United Kingdom
