= Mike Marino Memorial Shield =

British professional wrestling single-elimination tournament

- Promotion: Dale Martin Promotions
- Date: 29 September 1981 (aired 14 November 1981)
- City: Croydon, England
- Venue: Fairfield Halls

The Mike Marino Memorial Shield was a British professional wrestling single-elimination tournament produced by Dale Martin Promotions, which took place on 29 September 1981 at Fairfield Halls in Croydon, England. The event aired on ITV's World of Sport two months later. One of the first, if not the first, memorial shows in British professional wrestling, it was held in memory of longtime British Mid-Heavyweight Champion Mike Marino, arguably the most popular pro wrestler in the country during the 1960s and 1970s, who died on the M20 motorway in Folkestone, Kent on 24 August 1981. Ten professional wrestling matches were featured on the event's card, with three non-tournament matches.

The tournament was contested using Admiral-Lord Mountevans rules, greatly differing from professional wrestling in the United States, which included five-minute rounds, a points system, "knockouts" (countouts) and disqualifications counting as automatic two falls in best of three falls matches (which were predominant), and no follow-up moves allowed on a grounded opponent. Two of the first heat matches (Match #3: Mal Sanders versus John Naylor; Match #4: Pat Patton versus Johnny England) were decided on points rather than traditional pinfall or submission; the tournament final was decided in a best "two out of three falls" match.

Mal Sanders won the "knockout" tournament by winning three matches at the event. Over the course of the evening, he defeated "Golden Ace" John Naylor in the first heat, "Judo" Pat Patton in the semi-finals and "Cyanide" Syd Cooper in the final match. Sanders was traveling with Marino at the time of his death. In addition to the tournament, there were three standard wrestling matches which saw "Rollerball" Mark Rocco defeat "Gentleman" Chris Adams, Giant Haystacks defeat "Tarzan" Johnny Wilson, and Jackie Turpin beat Steve Logan. In the months following the tournament, Mal Sanders defended the trophy against former tournament entrants Jackie Turpin and Steve Logan in addition to opponents such as Johnny Saint, Steve Grey, Johnny England, Bobby Barnes, Ed Wensor, and Mick McManus.

== Show results ==
29 September 1981 at Fairfield Halls, Croydon
No.	Results	Stipulations
1	Mark Rocco defeated Chris Adams	Singles match
2	Giant Haystacks defeated Johnny Wilson	Singles match
3	Jackie Turpin defeated Steve Logan	Singles match
4	Kid Chocolate defeated Black Jack Mulligan	First Heat Tournament match
5	Mal Sanders defeated John Naylor via points decision	First Heat Tournament match
6	Syd Cooper defeated Jan Curtis via submission	First Heat Tournament match
7	Pat Patton defeated Johnny England via points decision	First Heat Tournament match
8	Syd Cooper defeated Kid Chocolate via referee decision	Semi Final Tournament match
9	Mal Sanders defeated Pat Patton	Semi Final Tournament match
10	Mal Sanders defeated Syd Cooper	Tournament Finals match

=== Tournament brackets ===
This was a one-night tournament which took place on 29 September 1981. The tournament brackets were:

Pin-Pinfall; Sub-Submission; CO-Countout; DCO-Double countout; DQ-Disqualification; Ref-Referee's decision; Pts-Points decision

Quarterfinals
Kid Chocolate	Pin
Black Jack Mulligan
Syd Cooper	Sub
Jan Curtis
Mal Sanders	Pts
John Naylor
Pat Patton	Pts
Johnny England

Semifinals
Kid Chocolate	Ref
Syd Cooper
Mal Sanders
Pat Patton	Pin

Finals
Syd Cooper
Mal Sanders	Pin^{1}

1. Mal Sanders scored two pinfalls during the match.

== See also ==
- Professional wrestling in the United Kingdom
