= Ray Steele (wrestler) =

British professional wrestler

The ring name Ray Steele was previously used by American wrestler Peter Sauer

Ray Steele (born Yorkshire) was the ring name of an English professional wrestler. A worker in the United Kingdom during the World of Sport era he made his television debut for the show on 6 June 1970 in a match with Leon Arras, and was later shown in other matches, including a match against "Judo" Pete Roberts. Steele would go on to have some measure of success, winning Joint Promotions' vacant British Heavyweight Championship on 14 April 1985. Steele kept this title for over a year before losing it to Pat Roach on 26 April 1986.

== Championships and accomplishments ==
=== Professional wrestling ===
- Joint Promotions
  - British Heavyweight Championship (1 time)
