= Brian Crabtree =

British professional wrestler

Personal information
- Born: Halifax, West Riding of Yorkshire, England

Professional wrestling career

Brian W. Crabtree is an English retired professional wrestler, referee and master of ceremonies, known for working alongside his brothers Shirley Crabtree, better known as Big Daddy, and promoter Max Crabtree in the British wrestling business.

== Career ==
Crabtree, along with his brothers Shirley and Max, got into wrestling after completing his National Service. It was during a match against a Hungarian wrestler that he sustained an injury and never wrestled again, causing him to become a referee. Before the mid-1970s, Brian and Max worked together in running 20th Century Promotions, an independent wrestling organisation outside of Joint Promotions, the largest wrestling promotion in the United Kingdom.

He later joined his brothers in Joint Promotions in the 1970s after Max took over as Joint's booker and Crabtree became a referee for Joint as a result. However, on one occasion due to the Crabtree brothers' closeness with each other, Kendo Nagasaki refused to wrestle Big Daddy (Shirley) with Crabtree refereeing. Crabtree was a regular ring announcer on World of Sport. He would primarily do ring announcing on television however on occasion he would stand in for Max Ward as the referee for televised matches on ITV. He did get involved in a match in 1979 between Big Daddy and John Quinn where he was knocked out by Quinn after standing on the ring apron. Outside of wrestling, he has acted in a number of films, (No Blade of Grass, The Wild Bunch), and held an Equity card.

== Personal life ==
Brian is the brother of professional wrestler Shirley Crabtree, and promoter Max Crabtree. His nephew Eorl Crabtree is a retired professional rugby league player.
