= Malcolm Kirk =

English professional wrestler & rugby league player (1935–1987)

- Malcolm "King Kong" Kirk

Personal information
- Born: 18 December 1935 Streethouse, West Riding of Yorkshire, England
- Died: 23 August 1987 (aged 51) Great Yarmouth, Norfolk, England

Professional wrestling career
- Ring name(s): Killer Kirk; King Kong Kirk; Kojak Kirk "Mucky" Mal Kirk
- Billed height: 6 ft 1 in (1.85 m)
- Billed weight: 309–353 lb (140–160 kg)
- Billed from: West Yorkshire, England
- Debut: 1950s
- Rugby league career

Personal information
- Full name: Malcolm Kirk

Playing information
- Position: Loose forward
Club
Years	Team	Pld	T	G	FG	P
1955–57	Featherstone Rovers	35	1	0	0	3
1957	Wakefield Trinity	0	0	0	0	0
1960–61	Castleford	2	0	0	0	0
1961	Doncaster RLFC	0	0	0	0	0
1961	Hull KR	4	0	0	0	0
	Total	41	1	0	0	3
- As of 10 Jun 2024

Malcolm Kirk (18 December 1935 – 23 August 1987) was an English professional wrestler who went by the ring name of "King Kong" Kirk as well as Kojak Kirk, Killer Kirk and "Mucky" Mal Kirk. He started as a professional rugby league player before becoming a professional wrestler. Kirk died of a heart attack on 23 August 1987 after collapsing in the ring during a tag team match at the Hippodrome in Great Yarmouth, Norfolk, England. The wrestling event was run by Joint Promotions with the main event being a tag team match between Kirk and King Kendo (Bill Clarke) against Big Daddy (Shirley Crabtree) and Greg Valentine (Steve Crabtree) in front of 1,500 people.

== Biography ==
Prior to professional wrestling, Kirk was a coal miner, and professional rugby league player. He played 35 first team matches as a loose forward for Featherstone Rovers making his début on 23 April 1955, playing from the 1954–55 season to the 1957–58 season scoring one try. He played three matches for Wakefield Trinity, making his début during December 1957, playing during the 1957–58 season, played two matches for Castleford during the 1960–1961 season, and he also played for Doncaster, where he was a teammate of another future professional wrestler, Ted Heath.

Kirk started wrestling as "Mucky" Mal Kirk after his rugby league career. After a period of time spent wrestling in Germany, where he tagged with Baron von Raschke, Kirk returned to the United Kingdom, now heavier and bald, wrestling as Kojak Kirk then Killer Kirk before changing his ring name to "King Kong" Kirk. Kirk always wrestled as a "heel" (bad guy) and often tagged with the superheavyweight Giant Haystacks in tag-team matches against blue-eyes (good guys). Kirk's work rose to its prominence in the 1970s and 1980s due to the popularity of televised wrestling in the United Kingdom and he was recognised as a consistent heel. Unlike a number of wrestlers at the time, he didn't rely on a wrestling gimmick during his time in professional wrestling. Kirk instead used his physical size and bald head in a manner of appearance which was viewed as legitimately intimidating. However he was viewed by his peers as being a good worker. Canadian wrestler Bret Hart said about his first match with Kirk: "Kirk turned out to be a great worker and bump-taker, and when he collapsed on top of me, he was as light as if he'd covered me with a blanket." Despite being a heel, outside of the ring he was good with children and made himself approachable.

During this time, Kirk also worked as a bouncer simultaneously with being a professional wrestler. He predominantly wrestled in the United Kingdom however he also wrestled in Germany, where he wrestled the future WWE Hall of Famer André the Giant, and in Canada for Stu Hart's Stampede Wrestling. He also wrestled future World Championship Wrestling and World Wrestling Federation wrestlers such as Bret "Hitman" Hart, Fit Finlay and William Regal. His reputation in professional wrestling had also spread to the United States, where he was featured in the Wrestling Observer Newsletter in 1986 as a result.

In 1979 he featured in an Italian film, Io sto con gli ippopotami with Bud Spencer and Terence Hill. Kirk later came to dislike wrestling and wanted to retire and run a pub with his wife.

== Death ==
On 23 August 1987, Kirk died following a tag team match between Kirk and King Kendo against Big Daddy and Greg Valentine at the Hippodrome in Great Yarmouth. The match took place as part of a storyline where Kirk was feuding with Big Daddy. He told his wife when he left his house the day he was due to wrestle the match: "I don't want to go; I hate this job". The match lasted for fifteen minutes. The finish of the match was Big Daddy performing his "Big Daddy Splashdown" finisher on Kirk, where he would jump up and land horizontally across his opponent's chest (which is commonly known as a splash), and hold Kirk down for the pinfall. After pinning Kirk to win the match, Big Daddy got up but Kirk remained on the canvas and started to turn purple. Big Daddy noticed there was something wrong and told his cornerman. The promoter Max Crabtree (Big Daddy's brother) and others got into the ring and attempted CPR. However, because of Kirk's size, they and the St John's Ambulance personnel present were unable to work Kirk's chest. The ring had to be dismantled, with eight men required to get Kirk on a stretcher and into the ambulance but he was pronounced dead upon arrival at the hospital.

Big Daddy went to a nearby police station accompanied by the promoter Max Crabtree for questioning by police but was not charged with any offence. During this time and subsequent media interviews later, Big Daddy maintained kayfabe, and spoke of the match in terms of being a legitimate contest. Big Daddy later wrestled the next day claiming it was what Kirk would have wanted. However Big Daddy did say "as long as I live, I'll never forget seeing him laid down there on the canvas instead of on his feet raging and flying about and that will stay with me".

The Health and Safety Executive launched an investigation into Kirk's death. The subsequent postmortem and inquiry revealed that Kirk had a previous heart condition and could have had the heart attack at any time but was more likely to have triggered owing to the physical nature of professional wrestling and found for a verdict of death by natural causes. Pathologist Norman Ball testified that Kirk had six unnoticed minor heart attacks prior to the one that killed him and likely had the fatal attack while he was standing prior to receiving the splashdown, stating "It is likely he was already dead when he fell to the canvas", thus clearing Big Daddy of any responsibility for Kirk's death.

=== Aftermath ===
Kirk's death garnered worldwide media attention, with some newspapers initially breaking the news by claiming that Big Daddy's splash killed Kirk. The British Medical Association recommended a maximum age limit for professional wrestlers as Kirk was approaching 52 at the time and criticised Joint Promotions for not having a doctor at ringside. Kirk's widow claimed that Kirk only earned £25 for the match, with a bonus of £5 for wrestling Big Daddy while Joint Promotions' promoters were earning thousands while she was left widowed with two children. She criticised the sport for the way it treated Kirk.

Since the decline of kayfabe there has been criticism of Big Daddy for continuing to treat the incident as a legitimate sporting accident. Later, Canadian wrestler Bret Hart, who wrestled Kirk for Joint Promotions, wrote in his book that few men could take Big Daddy's weight when he performed his other finishing move – the "double elbow" backdrop – and said "all it took was for Max to wave a few extra quid in a wrestler's face and he'd put his life on the line."

Several sources, including his own obituaries, incorrectly claimed that Big Daddy was so distraught by Kirk's death that he retired from professional wrestling. However he wrestled for six more years until 1993, still using the Big Daddy Splashdown despite calling for it to be banned and saying he would stop using it. Kirk had reportedly told some of his friends "If I have to go, I hope it is in the ring".

The death of Kirk is cited as having contributed to the decline of professional wrestling in the United Kingdom as people started to look at it more critically. It started to be compared to American professional wrestling, specifically the World Wrestling Federation, which was viewed as a higher quality product as the wrestlers were more muscular than the British wrestlers. Professional wrestling's television spot on ITV was cancelled just over a year after Kirk's death in December 1988. Joint Promotions dwindled and eventually went out of business in February 1995 although its chief rival at the time All Star Wrestling (for which Kirk also sporadically worked) remains active as of 2026.

== See also ==
- List of premature professional wrestling deaths
