= Man Mountain =

Man Mountain may refer to:

== Nickname or ring name ==
=== Professional wrestlers ===
- Man Mountain Dean (1891–1953), American professional wrestler
- Man Mountain Mike (1940–1988), American professional wrestler
- Man Mountain Harris (born 1948), better known as Black Bart (wrestler)
- Man Mountain Link (born 1959), better known as Rick Link
- Man Mountain Rock (born 1961), better known as Maxx Payne
- Man Mountain (1918–1963), better known as Bill Benny

=== Other ===
- William Pitt, 1st Earl of Chatham (1708–1778), Prime Minister of Great Britain
- Dean Uthoff (born 1958), American-Australian basketball player

== Arts and entertainment ==
- Man Mountain Marko, a Marvel Comics supervillain
- "The Man Mountain", a song by Bow Wow Wow
- A character from Better Call Saul
