= The File of the Golden Goose =

1969 British film by Sam Wanamaker

- Directed by: Sam Wanamaker
- Written by: Robert E. Kent
- Screenplay by: John C. Higgins
- Story by: John C. Higgins
- Produced by: David E. Rose; Edward Small (executive)
- Starring: Yul Brynner; Charles Gray; Edward Woodward
- Narrated by: Patrick Allen
- Cinematography: Ken Hodges
- Edited by: Oswald Hafenrichter
- Music by: Harry Robertson
- Production companies: Caralan Productions Ltd. Dador Productions
- Distributed by: United Artists
- Release dates: June 1969 (UK); 2 October 1969 (NYC)
- Running time: 106 minutes
- Country: United Kingdom
- Language: English

The File of the Golden Goose is a 1969 British neo noir thriller film directed by Sam Wanamaker and starring Yul Brynner, Charles Gray and Edward Woodward. Its plot involves an American detective being sent to Britain to track down a major international criminal. It is a reworking of the 1947 American film noir T-Men, directed by Anthony Mann.

== Plot ==
A trail of counterfeit hundred dollar bills has been discovered in several places around the world. When this comes to the attention of the United States Secret Service, they assign one of their top men, Pete Novak, to the case of finding out who is producing and distributing them.

Pete realizes that this is an assignment that demands his full attention, so he immediately breaks up with his girlfriend in preparation for the journey he must take. Before Pete can even begin his search, he is ambushed by a gang of hoodlums trying to shoot him down as they drive by outside his home. He concludes that the gang must have been tipped off by someone on the inside of the service about his new assignment. He manages to kill them, but discovers afterwards that the killers have accidentally shot and killed his ex-girlfriend in the process.

The killing of the girlfriend makes the whole assignment very personal for Pete. To begin the search for the counterfeit distributor, he travels across the Atlantic to London to visit Scotland Yard headquarters, since they are in charge of the counterfeit investigation in Europe. There, he meets up with Superintendent Sloane of the Yard, who arranges for him to be partnered by an investigator by the name of Arthur Thompson. Arthur is a very happily married jolly old copper, who manages to ignore all of Pete’s remarks about the inappropriateness of being a married man working as an agent or policeman.

Pete and Arthur start infiltrating the counterfeit organization, posing as members of the Golden Goose gang – a gang that has been all but erased from the face of the earth by the police. They use their fake identities to hide their undercover infiltration from the head of the illegal operation, "The Owl" Harrison, and are ultimately successful in stopping the counterfeit operation.

== Cast ==
- Yul Brynner as Peter Novak
- Charles Gray as Harrison ("The Owl")
- Edward Woodward as Arthur Thompson
- John Barrie as Superintendent Sloane
- Adrienne Corri as Angela 'Tina' Richmond
- Graham Crowden as Smythe
- Walter Gotell as George Leeds
- Anthony Jacobs as Firenos
- Ivor Dean as Reynolds
- Hugh McDermott as Ray Moss
- Hilary Heath as Ann Marlowe
- Ken Jones as Stroud
- Karel Štěpánek as Mueller
- Bernard Archard as Collins
- Geoffrey Reed as Martin
- Denis Shaw as Vance
- Joe Cornelius as Gordie
- Debbie Searle as Thompson's daughter
- Patrick Allen as narrator (uncredited)

== Critical reception ==
The Monthly Film Bulletin wrote: "Absolutely routine thriller in which it is difficult to suppress yawns of boredom (and some twinges of embarrassment) as Yul Brynner slowly discovers the merits of togetherness. Although both he and Edward Woodward give thoroughly competent performances, and are ably supported by Charles Gray (a hedonistic villain) and Graham Crowden (a sadistic killer inseparable from his umbrella-knife), the film plods wearily homewards through an exceptionally uninteresting batch of fights, intrigues and sinister encounters."

Leslie Halliwell said: "Incredibly predictable spy thriller which almost makes an eccentricity out of collecting so many clichés and so many tourist views of London. Like ten TV episodes cut together."
