= Robbie Dynamite =

British professional wrestler

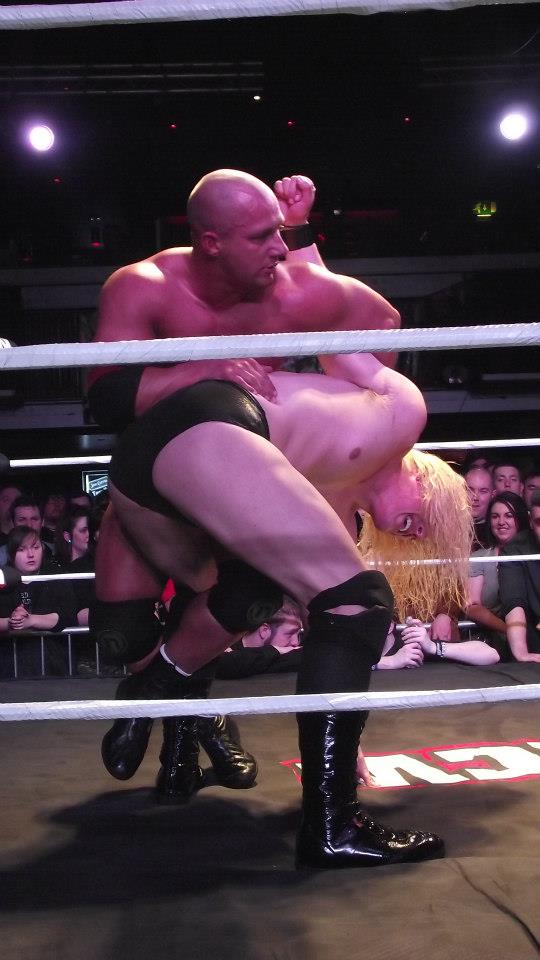
- Robbie Dynamite wrestling Mikey Whiplash for Insane Championship Wrestling in Glasgow, April 2013

Personal information
- Born: 21 July 1982 (age 44) Stoke on Trent, England

Professional wrestling career
- Ring name: Robbie Dynamite
- Billed height: 5 ft 8 in (173 cm)
- Billed weight: 209 lb (95 kg)
- Billed from: Stoke on Trent, England
- Trained by: Keith Myatt; Chris Curtis
- Debut: 1999

Robbie Dynamite (born Robert Berzins) is a British professional wrestler. He is the former five-time British Mid-Heavyweight champion and has also held the British Open Tag Team Championship and Unified British Tag Team Championship with Mikey Whiplash. He also hold former one-time British Heavyweight Champion

== Professional wrestling career ==
=== British and European Wrestling ===
Dynamite began his career with Staffordshire promotion GBH, later being headhunted by All Star Wrestling in 2001 along with fellow GBH alumnus Dean Allmark. Initially, he was a blue eye teamed with Allmark, but soon turned heel on him, igniting a feud that would run throughout the 2000s. As a heel, Dynamite adopted the moniker "The Body" (previously made famous by American wrestler turned commentator turned politician Jesse Ventura.)

In April 2002, Dynamite defeated Allmark to capture the vacant British Mid-Heavyweight title, thus reviving the historic championship left vacant for the past 21 years since the death of previous champion Mike Marino in 1981. Over the course of the remainder of the decade, he would lose and regain the championship four times, mostly to Allmark. He also formed a tag team with "Chippendale" Mikey Whiplash and together, they captured the British Open Tag Team Title from the UK Dream Team of Allmark and Kid Cool in February 2006 in Staffordshire.

In 2013, Dynamite challenged Mikey Whiplash for the ICW Heavyweight Championship but was defeated.

On 29 March 2014, Dynamite unsuccessfully challenged Chaos for the Union of European Wrestling Alliances European Heavyweight Championship in Kiel, Germany.

At Wrestling Festival 2015, Dynamite defeated Minoru Tanaka for the EWP Intercontinental Championship.

At a house show in Rhyl on 30 August 2016, Dynamite defeated James Mason to win the British Heavyweight Championship (left vacant after Sam Adonis was stripped of the title for lack of defences) but lost the belt later in the night to Allmark, who had earned the championship match in a Money In The Bank match earlier in the evening.

=== Total Nonstop Action Wrestling ===
Robbie Dynamite was a member of Team Britain in TNA Wrestling's 2004 America's X-Cup. Team Britain was led by James Mason, mentored by David Taylor, and also included Dean Allmark and Frankie Sloan. Team Britain finished in last place in America's X-Cup behind Team Mexico, Team USA, and Team Canada. The Tournament was virtually dominated by AAA's Team Mexico. After America's X-Cup ended, Team Britain did not return to TNA for the 2004 World X-Cup. The fourth Team spot was filled by Team Japan.

== Championships and accomplishments ==
- All Star Wrestling
  - British Heavyweight Championship (1 time)
  - British Mid-Heavyweight Championship (5 times)
- European Wrestling Promotion
  - EWP Intercontinental Championship (1 time)
- Revolution Pro Wrestling
  - Undisputed British Tag Team Championship (1 time) – with Mikey Whiplash
