= British Heavyweight Championship =

Professional wrestling championship

The British Heavyweight Championship is a top British wrestling championship found throughout the country's circuit. The championship was recognised and defended on matches screened by UK national television network ITV as part of the professional wrestling slot on World of Sport as well as standalone broadcasts. Pre-publicity for these championship match broadcasts was given in ITV's nationally published listings magazine TVTimes.

Multiple versions of the British Heavyweight Championship may exist in the wrestling circuit of the United Kingdom at any given time, however some versions have been undisputed by dint of being the only active version during that period. The British Wrestling Association version was undisputed 1930–1934 and 1938–1950. The Joint Promotions version was undisputed 1952–1958, 1966–1974 and 1975–1982. This version was then transferred to All Star Wrestling where it remained undisputed until 1985 and became so again from 1989 until the late 1990s (as smaller, often American-style promotions increasingly set up their own versions).

== Title histories ==
This is the combined list of different versions of the British Heavyweight Titles, each of which was probably the most significant version at the time. Each version may or may not be connected to another. However, all title changes are either actual or "official" unless indicated otherwise.

Key

Symbol	Meaning
No.	The overall championship reign
Reign	The reign number for the specific wrestler listed.
Event	The event in which the championship changed hands
N/A	The specific information is not known
—	Used for vacated reigns in order to not count it as an official reign
[Note]	Indicates that the exact length of the title reign is unknown, with a note providing more details.

=== British Wrestling Association 1930–1950 ===
No.	Champion	Reign	Date	Days held	Location	Event	Notes	Ref.
1	Atholl Oakeley	1	1930	(Note: The length of the championship is too uncertain to calculate.)	(Note: The location of the match was not captured as part of the documentation.)	Live event	Won a series of matches to become the first champion.	
—	Vacated	—	1935	—	N/A	N/A	Vacated when Oakeley retired due to injuries	
2	Bill Garnon	1	1935		London, England	Live event		
3	Fazal Mohammed	1	1937			Live event		
4	Alan Muir	1	1938			Live event		
5	Michael O'Leary	1	1939			Live event		
—	Vacated	—	—	—	N/A	N/A	Michael O'Leary was killed during the outbreak of the war, he died undefeated.	
6	Bert Assirati	1	27 January 1945		Manchester	Live event	Assirati had been claiming the title since 1940.	
—	Vacated	—	1950	—	N/A	N/A	Championship vacated when Assirati left Britain for India.	

Disputed claims 1934–1938

No.	Champion	Reign	Date	Days held	Location	Event	Notes	Ref.
1	Bill Garnon	1	1934		London	Live event	Some claim Garnon's first reign began one year earlier	
2	Douglas Clark	1	2 November 1934		Manchester	Live event		
3	George Gregory	1	1938			Live event	Won by default when Clark fails to appear for a scheduled defence.	
—	Vacated	—	—	—	N/A	N/A	Until Bert Assirati is recognised as champion	

=== Joint Promotions 1952–1982 & 1985–1989 ===
No.	Champion	Reign	Date	Days held	Location	Event	Notes	Ref.
1	Ernie Baldwin	1	January 1952		Newcastle	Live event	Defeated Dave Armstrong in a tournament final.	
2	Alf Rawlings	1	1953			Live event		
3	Dai Sullivan	1	1953			Live event		
4	Ernie Baldwin	2	1953			Live event		
5	Tony Mancelli	1	9 September 1955			Live event		
—	Vacated	—	1955	—	N/A	N/A	Championship vacated for undocumented reasons.	
6	Bert Assirati	2	19 October 1955			Live event	Defeated Ernie Baldwin	
—	Vacated	—	1958	—	N/A	N/A	Stripped by Joint Promotions; Assirati would continue to claim the title in BWF	
7	Billy Joyce	1	15 April 1958		London	Live event	Defeated Gordon Nelson.	
8	Ernie Baldwin	3	November 1959		Glasgow	Live event		
9	Billy Joyce	2	December 1959			Live event		
10	Dennis Mitchell	1	December 1959			Live event		
11	Billy Joyce	3	15 July 1960	1,333	Bradford	Live event		
12	Geoff Portz	1	9 March 1964	17	Bradford	Live event		
13	Billy Joyce	4	26 March 1964	693	Middlesbrough	Live event		
14	Albert Wall	1	17 February 1966	3	Nottingham	Live event		
15	Gwynn Davies	1	20 February 1966	25	Nottingham	Live event		
16	Billy Joyce	5	17 March 1966	48	Nottingham	Live event		
17	Ian Campbell	1	4 May 1966	55	Perth, Scotland	Live event		
18	Billy Joyce	6	28 June 1966	204	Edinburgh	Live event	Became the undisputed champion when Shirley Crabtree vacated the BWF version.	
19	Billy Robinson	1	18 January 1967		Manchester	Live event		
—	Vacated	—	February 1970	—	N/A	N/A	Championship vacated when Robinson left for North America.	
20	Albert Wall	2	13 April 1970	280	Nottingham	Live event	Defeated Steve Veidor to win the vacant championship	
21	Gwynn Davies	2	18 January 1971	110	Loughborough	Live event		
22	Albert Wall	3	8 May 1971		Manchester	Live event		
—	Vacated	—	1974	—	N/A	N/A	Championship vacated when Wall "retired" (in fact left Joint to work for independent promoters and continued to claim title – see All Star below)	
23	Gwynn Davies	3	15 February 1975	833	Manchester	Live event		
24	Tony St. Clair	1	28 May 1977	543	Manchester	Live event		
25	Giant Haystacks	1	22 November 1978	154	London	Live event		
26	Tony St. Clair	2	25 April 1979		London	Live event	Moved to #All Star Wrestling in 1982 with the title	
—	Vacated	—	1985	—	N/A	N/A	Recognition was withdrawn by Joint Promotions in 1985	
27	Ray Steele	1	14 May 1985	377	Croydon	Live event		
28	Pat Roach	1	26 April 1986	159		Live event		
29	Dalbir Singh	1	2 October 1986			Live event		
—	Vacated	—	1989	—	N/A	N/A	All Star's Tony St. Clair becomes undisputed champion after Singh joins All Star and renounces his claim.	

=== Disputed Branch: British Wrestling Federation 1958–1966 ===
No.	Champion	Reign	Date	Days held	Location	Event	Notes	Ref.
1	Bert Assirati	2	1958			Live event	Stripped by Joint Promotions – Continued to claim title and was recognised by BWF	
—	Vacated	—	1960	—	N/A	N/A	Assirati stripped by BWF while recovering from injury.	
2	Shirley Crabtree	1	1960			Live event	Won a tournament	
—	Vacated	—	1966	—	N/A	N/A	Crabtree retired after a legitimate campaign of harassment by Assirati. No replacement was crowned, making Joint Promotions' Billy Joyce an Undisputed Champion.	

=== All Star Wrestling 1974, 1982–present ===
No.	Champion	Reign	Date	Days held	Location	Event	Notes	Ref.
0	Albert Wall	3	8 May 1971		Manchester	Live event	Continued to defend title on shows by Wrestling Enterprises (as All Star then known) for some months after 1974 "retirement" from Joint	
—	Vacated	—	mid/late 1970s	—	N/A	N/A	Championship vacated when Wall retires completely.	
1	Tony St. Clair	2	25 April 1979		London	Live event	Came to All Star in 1982 with the title from Joint Promotions. No direct lineage to above Albert Wall splinter claim.	
2	Kendo Nagasaki	1	1988			Live event		
3	Tony St. Clair	3	1988			Live event	Became undisputed champion after Joint Promotions' champion Singh joins All Star in 1989 and renounces his claim.	
4	Dave 'Fit' Finlay	1	5 February 1990	425	Croydon	Live event		
5	Dave Taylor	1	6 April 1991	759	King's Lynn	Live event		
6	Tony St. Clair	4	4 May 1993		Croydon	Live event		
—	Vacated	—	1995	—	N/A	N/A	Championship vacated for undocumented reasons.	
7	Dave Taylor	2	August 1995		Croydon	Live event	Defeated Marty Jones in a tournament final.	
8	Marty Jones	1	1996		Croydon	Live event		
—	Vacated	—	1996	—	N/A	N/A	Upon Marty Jones' retirement	
9	Karl Krammer	1	circa 1998			Live event	Claimed title by 1998	
10	Doug Williams	1	2001			Live event	Claiming title by 2001. Would later take the title to the Universal title tournament.	
11	Robbie Brookside	1	29 September 2002	982	Liverpool	Live event	Williams was still considered the Universal champion	
12	Drew McDonald	1	7 June 2005	224	Croydon	Live event		
13	Steve Sonic	1	17 January 2006	129	Croydon	Live event		
—	Vacated	—	26 May 2006	—	N/A	N/A	Sonic would relinquish the title to return to WWE's developmental promotion Ohio Valley Wrestling.	
14	James Mason	1	12 November 2006	232		Live event	Mason defeated Drew McDonald, Doug Williams, and Robbie Brookside in a 4-way elimination match to win the vacant title.	
15	Brody Steele	1	2 September 2007	162	Liverpool	Live event		
16	Robbie Brookside	2	11 February 2008	Liverpool	Live event			
—	Vacated	—	May 2009	—	N/A	N/A	Championship vacated due to a knee injury.	
17	Rampage Brown	1	16 May 2009	270	Hanley	Live event	Won 4-way elimination final of an 8-man tournament against James Mason, Doug Williams, and Karl Kramer.	
18	Dean Allmark	1	2 October 2010	774	Hanley	Live event		
19	Rampage Brown	2	25 March 2012	356	Croydon	Live event		
20	Dean Allmark	2	16 March 2013	566	Hanley	Live event		
21	Thunder (Darren Walsh)	1	3 October 2014	333	Croydon	Live event		
—	Vacated	—	September 2015	—	N/A	N/A	Championship vacated due to a knee injury.	;
22	Sam Adonis	1	3 October 2015	<332	Croydon	Live event	Defeats James Mason in tournament final	
—	Vacated	—	August 2016	—	N/A	N/A	Stripped of title due to lack of defences.	;
23	Robbie Dynamite	1	30 August 2016	<1	Rhyl	Live event	Defeats James Mason in match for vacant title	
24	Dean Allmark	3	30 August 2016	150	Rhyl	Live event	Earned title shot at new champion Robbie Dynamite after winning Money in the Bank earlier in the evening	
25	Harlem Bravado	1	27 January 2017	273	New Brighton	Live event		
26	Oliver Grey	1	27 October 2017	3,224	Ipswich	Live event		
27	Niwa	1	19 February 2020	2,379	Gravesend	Live event	Niwa returned to his native New Zealand during the COVID-19 pandemic, returning to the UK in 2022. He was excused from defending his title during this period.	
28	Oliver Grey	2	14 October 2022	1,411	Telford	Live event		
28	Mickey Long	1	28 October 2024	666	Gravesend	Live event	Later recognised by ASW as World Heavyweight Champion from start of 2025	
29	Tommy Freeman	1	1 January 2025	601	N/A	N/A	Awarded recognition when ASW recognises Long as World Heavyweight Champion. Previously recognised as British champion by First Class Wrestling	
30	"Bronco" Billy Wild	1	10 August 2026	15	Rhyl	Live event		
31	Tommy Freeman	2	24 August 2026	1	Rhyl	Live event		

=== Disputed Branch: The Wrestling Alliance 1999–2003 ===
No.	Champion	Reign	Date	Days held	Location	Eventd	Notes	Ref.
1	Robbie Brookside	1	1999			Live event	Recognised as champion by TWA	
2	Drew McDonald	1	March 2001			Live event		
3	Justin Starr	1	7 May 2001	66	Weymouth	Live event		
—	Vacated	—	12 July 2001	—	N/A	N/A	Following a controversial finish in the Starr/MacDonald rematch.	
—	Vacated	—	16 December 2001	—	N/A	N/A	Brookside was suspended and stripped of the belts-after sanctioning his own defences resulting in a breach of contract.	
4	Justin Starr	2	17 January 2002	9	Southampton	Live event		
5	Doug Williams	1	26 January 2002	0	Bognor Regis	FWA Champion, Williams defeated Justin Starr to win recognition by The Wrestling Alliance.		
6	Robbie Brookside	2	26 January 2002	Bognor Regis				
—	Vacated	—	1 February 2002	—	N/A	N/A	Rumble match would be held the same night to declare new champion.	
7	Justin Starr	3	1 February 2002	160	Exmouth	Live event	Won a royal rumble match to win the vacant championship	
8	Ricky Knight	1	11 July 2002		Weymouth	Live event		
9	Justin Starr	4	November 2002		Bristol	Live event		
—	Vacated	—	2002	—	N/A	N/A	Championship vacated due to injury.	
10	Alex Shane	1	23 March 2003			Live event	Defeated James Mason for the vacant belt.	
—	Vacated	—	25 March 2003	—	N/A	N/A	TWA's owner, Scott Conway would strip the title from Shane following his actions in a match against Jake "The Snake" Roberts.	
—	Vacated	—	2003	—	N/A	N/A	Conway closes the company and emigrates to Thailand.	

== Universal British Heavyweight Championship ==
On 10 July 2002 All-Star's Champion, Doug Williams along with other top title holding wrestlers entered into a tournament to be recognised as Universal British Heavyweight Champion by The Wrestling Alliance, Frontier Wrestling Alliance, World Association of Wrestling, All Star Wrestling, and Premier Promotions. Doug Williams would first defeat the then-TWA British Heavyweight Champion, Justin Starr (though Starr would continue to be recognised as champion), before going on to defeat The Zebra Kid in a tournament final to become the Universal British Heavyweight Champion.

The Universal version of this title would not last long with all the promotions splitting out their British Heavyweight titles, but Williams continued to be recognised as the Universal British Heavyweight Champion.

== See also ==
- Professional wrestling in the United Kingdom
- FWA/XWA British Heavyweight Championship
