= Pat Roach =

British professional wrestler and actor (1937–2004)

- Roach in an undated publicity shot
- Born: Francis Patrick Roach; 19 May 1937; Birmingham, Warwickshire, England
- Died: 17 July 2004 (aged 67); Bromsgrove, Worcestershire, England
- Occupations: Actor, author, businessman, wrestler
- Years active: 1960–2004
- Spouse: Doreen Harris (m. 1957)
- Children: 2
- Professional wrestling career
- Ring names: Judo Pat Roach; Bomber Pat Roach; Big Pat Roach
- Billed height: 6 ft 4 in (1.93 m)
- Billed weight: 19 st (120 kg)
- Trained by: Alf Kent
- Debut: 1960
- Retired: 2000

Francis Patrick Roach (19 May 1937 – 17 July 2004) was an English professional wrestler, martial artist and actor. During an acting career between the 1970s and the 1990s, he appeared in multiple films, usually as a henchman. He appeared in the Indiana Jones film series, as the West Country bricklayer Brian "Bomber" Busbridge in the 1980s British television series Auf Wiedersehen, Pet, and in the role of Petty Officer Edgar Evans in the television production The Last Place on Earth.

== Early life ==
Roach was born and brought up in Birmingham, West Midlands, the son of Francis "Frank" Roach (born 1905). He was National Judo Champion in 1960, and Midland Area Black Belt Champion in 1962.

== Sports career ==
Roach during his wrestling career

Roach boxed as an amateur before becoming professional as a protege of Jack Solomons.

He began his professional wrestling career under the name of "Judo" Pat Roach. After his acting career had begun, he continued to wrestle under the name of "Bomber" Pat Roach, having previously been billed as "Big" Pat Roach before receiving affectionate cheering from the audience. He was trained by Alf Kent and his first official wrestling match was against George Selko in 1960. Roach held both the British and European heavyweight championships at one time.

== Acting career ==
Roach made his acting debut as the red-bearded bouncer in the Korova Milkbar in Stanley Kubrick's A Clockwork Orange. He worked on another Kubrick film, Barry Lyndon, where he played a hand-to-hand brawler named Toole who engages Redmond Barry in a fistfight. Roach went on to play a number of strongman supporting character roles in films in the 1970s, 80s, and 90s, including the non-speaking role of Hephaestus in Clash of the Titans.

Pat cameoed as a SPECTRE assassin in the non–Eon produced James Bond film Never Say Never Again, and as the bandit-warlord Lord Brytag in the sword-and-sorcery film Red Sonja. He appeared as the skull-helmeted General Kael in the film Willow, the evil wizard Thoth-Amon in Conan the Destroyer, and the Celtic chieftain in Robin Hood: Prince of Thieves.

In 1985, he played Petty Officer Edgar Evans in the Central TV serial The Last Place on Earth about Captain Robert Falcon Scott's expedition to the South Pole. Roach was turned down for the part of Darth Vader in Star Wars; however, its director, George Lucas, subsequently cast him as several burly villains in the Indiana Jones film series in the 1980s. In Raiders of the Lost Ark he played two roles, the first being a giant Sherpa who fights Jones in the bar in Nepal, the second a German Luftwaffe mechanic who fistfights with Jones before being killed by an aircraft's propeller blades on the airstrip in Egypt. In the next film, Indiana Jones and the Temple of Doom, Roach played the Thuggee guard overseer in a mine who fights with Jones before being killed in a rock crusher. His final appearance in the series was as a Gestapo officer in Indiana Jones and the Last Crusade, where he appears only briefly because the character's fight with Jones was cut — the director, Steven Spielberg, considered the scene otherwise "too long" for a subplot.

On television Roach played the down-to-earth and easygoing Brian "Bomber" Busbridge in the long-running comedy-drama Auf Wiedersehen, Pet. He appeared in all four series, but was absent from the final two-part Christmas special. He was a guest on Central TV's Bullseye game show in 1984, and appeared in season 11, episode 39 ("Swan Song"), of The Bill, playing the character Reg Warren.

== Personal life ==
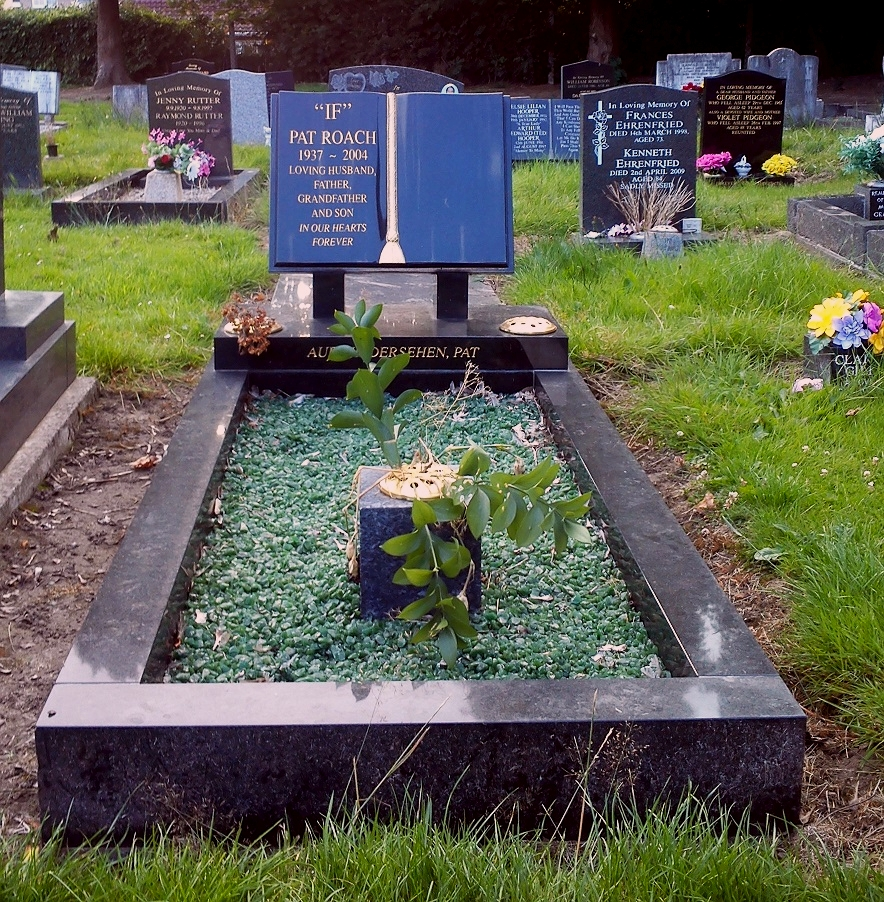
Roach's grave in Bromsgrove

Roach married Doreen Harris in 1957. They had a son and a daughter.

In the 1990s, Roach owned and co-managed a scrapyard in Winson Green, Birmingham. He also ran a gym on Gravelly Hill North, Erdington, in North-East Birmingham.

Roach died on 17 July 2004 of esophageal cancer. His body was buried in extension section B at Bromsgrove Cemetery, Worcestershire.

== Filmography ==
=== Film ===
Year	Title	Role	Notes
1971	A Clockwork Orange	Milkbar Bouncer	Uncredited
1975	Barry Lyndon	Corporal Toole	
1979	Unidentified Flying Oddball	Oaf	
1980	Rising Damp	Rugby Player	
1981	The Monster Club	Great Uncle	Uncredited
1981	Raiders of the Lost Ark	Giant Sherpa / 1st Mechanic	
1981	Clash of the Titans	Hephaestus	
1983	Never Say Never Again	Lippe	
1984	Indiana Jones and the Temple of Doom	Chief Guard	
1984	Conan the Destroyer	Man Ape / Thoth-Amon	
1985	Red Sonja	Brytag	
1988	Willow	General Kael	
1989	The Return of the Musketeers	French Executioner	
1989	Indiana Jones and the Last Crusade	Gestapo	
1990	Wings of Fame		
1990	The Big Man	Billy	
1991	Robin Hood: Prince of Thieves	Celtic Chieftain	
1996	The Portrait of a Lady	Strongman	
1997	Kull the Conqueror	Zulcki	
2003	Crust	The Bull	

=== Television ===
Year	Title	Role	Notes
1976	Gangsters	IRA Muscle	2 episodes
1978	Hazell	Big Arti	Episode: "Hazell and the Maltese Vulture"
1980	Play for Today	Man in the Street	Episode: Pasmore
1980	Juliet Bravo	Doulton	Episode: "The Anastasia Syndrome"
1983–1986, 2002–2004	Auf Wiedersehen, Pet	Brian "Bomber" Busbridge	Main role
1985	Minder	Painter	Episode: "Return of the Invincible Man"
1985	The Last Place on Earth	Edgar Evans	Miniseries
1989	Casualty	Len	Episode: "Chain Reaction"
1991	The Storyteller: Greek Myths	Atlas	Miniseries
1995	Space Precinct	Ogree	Episode: "Illegal"
1995	The Bill	Reg Warren	Episode: "Swan Song"
1995	The Detectives	Police Constable	Episode: Twitchers
1996	Heartbeat	The Masked Marvel	Episode: "Thanks to Alfred"
1997	Pirates	Red-Eye the Wrongdoer	Episode: "Long Gone Silver - Part One"
1998	The New Adventures of Robin Hood		2 episodes
2001	Starhunter	Goran	Episode: "Cell Game"

== Championships and accomplishments ==
- Joint Promotions

- British Heavyweight Championship (once)
- European Heavyweight Championship (twice)

- Premier Promotions|Premier Wrestling Federation

- Ken Joyce Trophy (1992)

== Publications ==
- If, Brewin Books (co-written childhood autobiography)
- Pat Roach's Birmingham, Brewin Books (2004)
