= Ted Beresford =

British professional wrestling promoter (1910–1990)

Personal information
- Born: Walter Leonard Beresford; 1910 Huddersfield, West Riding of Yorkshire, England
- Died: 14 December 1990

Professional wrestling career

Walter Leonard Beresford (23 October 1910 – 14 December 1990) was a British professional wrestler and promoter.

== Career ==
Beresford was born 23 October 1910 in Huddersfield. He began wrestling during the 1950s. Beresford began promoting wrestling shows in Yorkshire and the surrounding counties in the 1940s, together with Norman Morrell, and was part of the Joint Promotions cartel. He worked closely with George de Relwyskow.

Beresford died on 14 December 1990.
