= Big Daddy (wrestler) =

English professional wrestler (1930–1997)

- Big Daddy, c. 1983

Personal information
- Born: Shirley Crabtree Jr. 14 November 1930 Halifax, West Riding of Yorkshire, England
- Died: 2 December 1997 (aged 67) Halifax, West Yorkshire, England
- Website: shirleycrabtree.co.uk

Professional wrestling career
- Ring names: Big Daddy; Mr. Universe; The Battling Guardsman; The Blond Adonis
- Billed height: 6 ft 5 in (196 cm)
- Billed weight: 350 lb (159 kg)
- Trained by: George Hackenschmidt; Sandy Orford
- Debut: 1946
- Retired: 29 December 1993

Shirley Crabtree Jr. (14 November 1930 – 2 December 1997), better known as Big Daddy, was an English professional wrestler. He worked for Joint Promotions and the original British Wrestling Federation. Initially appearing on television as a heel, he teamed with Giant Haystacks. After splitting with Haystacks, he became a fan favourite and the top star of Joint Promotions from the late 1970s to the early 1990s.

== Early life ==
Shirley Crabtree Jr., was the first child of a blacksmith's daughter and weighed about twelve pounds at birth. He was given the name Shirley, like his father, who was a professional player of rugby league for Halifax R.L.F.C. and part of the team that won the Challenge Cup at Wembley in 1931. Shirley was traditionally a man's name but had become popular as a girl's name following the Charlotte Brontë novel, Shirley. In the 1930s, the name was especially associated with the child movie-star, Shirley Temple, and so the boy was teased and bullied at school. His father abandoned the family when his son was seven, and so the bullying toughened up the young Crabtree in the manner portrayed by "A Boy Named Sue",

Well, that song described me down to a tee now I look to the past and think about it, and after a while I started to get very angry. The desire to defend myself became overwhelming and the bullies' days were numbered because I hit back twice as hard.

Prior to becoming a wrestler, Crabtree served in the Coldstream Guards, and worked as a lifeguard in Blackpool.

== Professional wrestling career ==
=== Early career ===
Shirley Crabtree Jr., decided to follow in the footsteps of his father, Shirley Crabtree Sr., becoming a professional wrestler in 1952. He first became popular in the late 1950s, and early 1960s as a blue-eye billed as "Blond Adonis Shirley Crabtree." He won the European Heavyweight Championship in Joint Promotions and a disputed branch of the British Heavyweight title in the independent British Wrestling Federation before he quit in 1966 following a (non-kayfabe) campaign of harassment at wrestling shows by former champion Bert Assirati. He retired for roughly six years. During the 1960s Crabtree owned an underground nightclub in Bradford which is now called Sunbridge Wells.

=== Comeback ===
In 1972, Crabtree returned to Joint Promotions as a villain with a gimmick of the Battling Guardsman based on his former service with the Coldstream Guards. It was during this period that he made his first appearances on ITV both on World of Sport and on the midweek late evening wrestling slot.

Not long afterwards, Crabtree's brother, Max, was appointed as Northern area booker with Joint Promotions and began to transform Crabtree into the persona for which he would be best remembered. Based originally on the character of the same name played by actor Burl Ives in the 1958 first screen adaptation of Tennessee Williams' Cat on a Hot Tin Roof, 'Big Daddy' was first given life by Crabtree in late 1974, initially still as a villain. The character's leotards were emblazoned with just a large "D" and were crafted by Crabtree's wife Eunice, from the chintz settee of the family home. The character first gained attention in mid-1975 when he formed a tag team with TV newcomer Giant Haystacks and together they became notorious as 'villains' crushing blue eye opponents. During this period, Daddy was cheered by the audience, for the first time since his comeback, when he entered into a feud with masked villain Kendo Nagasaki, especially when he pulled off Nagasaki's mask during a televised contest from Solihull in December 1975 (although the unmasked Nagasaki quickly won the bout moments later).

By the middle of 1977, Big Daddy had completed his transformation into a blue eye, a change cemented by the breakdown of his tag team with Haystacks and a subsequent feud between the two which would last until the early 1990s. A firm fans' favourite particularly amongst children, Big Daddy came to the ring in either a sequinned cape or a Union Flag jacket and top hat. In addition to his feud with Haystacks, Daddy also feuded with Canadian wrestler "Mighty" John Quinn. He headlined Wembley Arena with singles matches against Quinn in 1979 and Haystacks in 1981, as well as a tag match in 1980 with Wayne Bridges against Quinn and Yasu Fuji. Later in the 1980s he feuded with Dave "Fit" Finlay, Drew McDonald and numerous other villains.

In August 1987 at the Hippodrome circus in Great Yarmouth, Big Daddy performed in a tag team match pitting himself and nephew Steve Crabtree (billed as "Greg Valentine") against King Kong Kirk and King Kendo. After Big Daddy had delivered a splash and pinned King Kong Kirk, rather than selling the impact of the finishing move, Kirk turned an unhealthy colour and was rushed to a nearby hospital where he was pronounced dead on arrival. Despite the fact that the inquest into Kirk's death found that he had a serious heart condition and cleared Big Daddy of any responsibility, Big Daddy was devastated.

He continued to make regular appearances into the early 1990s, but he eventually retired from wrestling altogether in 1993 to spend the remainder of his days in his home town of Halifax. During his career, Prime Minister Margaret Thatcher and Elizabeth II said they were fans of "Big Daddy".

== Personal life and death ==
Big Daddy was a professional rugby league footballer for Bradford Northern. His temper often forced him off the pitch early. He also had stints as a coal miner and with the British Army's Coldstream Guards.

His brother Brian Crabtree was a wrestling referee and later MC, while his younger brother Max was a booker for – and later proprietor of – Joint Promotions. His nephews Steve and Spencer Crabtree also had wrestling careers – Steve wrestled in the 1980s, and 1990s, billed as 'Greg Valentine' (named after the American wrestler of the same name) while Spencer wrestled as Scott Valentine. Both worked as tag team partners for their uncle. Another nephew; Eorl Crabtree is a former rugby league footballer for England and the Huddersfield Giants.

Big Daddy died of a stroke on 2 December 1997 at Halifax General Hospital, aged 67. He was survived by his second wife of 31 years, Eunice and six children.

== Other media ==
Big Daddy had his own comic strip in Buster during the early 1980s drawn by Mike Lacey. In 1982 ITV planned to build a TV programme around 'Big Daddy' as a replacement for the popular children's Saturday morning Tiswas show. A pilot for Big Daddy's Saturday Show was shot and a series announced but Big Daddy pulled out at the last moment, leaving the hastily renamed The Saturday Show presented by Isla St Clair and Tommy Boyd.

A stage play by Brian Mitchell and Joseph Nixon, Big Daddy vs Giant Haystacks, premiered at the Brighton Festival Fringe in East Sussex, England between 26–28 May 2011 and subsequently toured Great Britain.

Big Daddy is referenced on Luke Haines' 2011 album 9 1/2 Psychedelic Meditations on British Wrestling of the 1970s & Early '80s, as the owner of a Casio VL-Tone synthesizer.

In late 2021, Big Daddy had a Retro figure released through Chella toys for a 2022 release.

Would Big Daddy Be A Gammon? is the title of a 2026 release by Kunt and The Gang with an illustration of Big Daddy in a Union Jack hat and leotard on the digital single's cover.

=== Video games ===
Video game appearances
Year	Title	Notes
2002	Legends of Wrestling II	Video game debut. Exclusive to European version

== Championships and accomplishments ==
- British Wrestling Federation

- British Heavyweight Championship (1 time)
- European Heavyweight Championship (2 times)
