= Max Crabtree =

British professional wrestler (1933–2023)

Personal information
- Born: Max Gerald Crabtree; 1933 Halifax, West Riding of Yorkshire, England
- Died: 2 April 2023 (aged 90)

Professional wrestling career
- Retired: 1994

Max Gerald Crabtree (1933 – 2 April 2023) was an English professional wrestler and promoter, known for working alongside his brother Shirley Crabtree, better known as Big Daddy.

== Career ==
Crabtree got into wrestling after completing his National Service along with his brothers Shirley and Brian. After an injury in a match to Brian and Shirley retiring, Crabtree moved into booking. Initially he booked independently for 20th Century Promotions. He was due to join Jackie Pallo and Johnny Dale to set up a rival wrestling organisation to Joint Promotions. However, Dale died and Crabtree was headhunted to join Joint Promotions as he was the most experienced booker in the UK at the time.

During the 1970s, Max was appointed Northern area booker with Joint Promotions, where he is credited with bringing Shirley out of retirement and inventing the Big Daddy persona and gimmick for his brother. Crabtree helped to promote a number of wrestlers including Dynamite Kid, Davey Boy Smith (as Young David), William Regal (as Roy Regal) and George Kidd. He spent forty years as a wrestling promoter. Crabtree worked on bringing in foreign talent to wrestle in the UK, such as Sammy Lee (who later wrestled as Tiger Mask) after a recommendation from Karl Gotch. He was highly regarded in the British wrestling industry for his booking skills.

Crabtree came under criticism for building Joint Promotions around Big Daddy, leading to allegations of nepotism. He offered £30 fight purses for main events with Big Daddy as opposed to £25 for all other bouts. This came to light following the death of King Kong Kirk in the ring after a match with Big Daddy (though the subsequent autopsy found for a death from natural causes and cleared the Crabtrees of any wrongdoing). Former WWF and WCW champion Bret Hart wrote in his autobiography that Max would "wave a few extra quid in a wrestler's face" to entice them to take Daddy's "double elbow" backdrop move. ITV removed wrestling from television in 1988. Crabtree criticised American wrestling such as the World Wrestling Federation calling it "over the top and a load of ballyhoo".

Crabtree continued to promote wrestling under the banner Ring Wrestling Stars from 1991 until his retirement in February 1995. Big Daddy continued to headline his shows until his own retirement in December 1993, thereafter Max Crabtree employed Davey Boy Smith in a similar headline role for several months in 1994.

== Personal life and death ==
As well as Shirley Crabtree, Max was also the brother of referee and MC Brian Crabtree. in the 1960s, Max and Brian were themselves wrestlers in the middleweight and lightweight divisions respectively. His nephew Eorl Crabtree is a retired professional rugby league player.

Crabtree died 2 April 2023, at the age of 90.
