= Sunbridge Wells =

Leisure and shopping facility and tourist attraction in West Yorkshire, England

Coordinates: 53°47′36.9″N 1°45′19.4″W

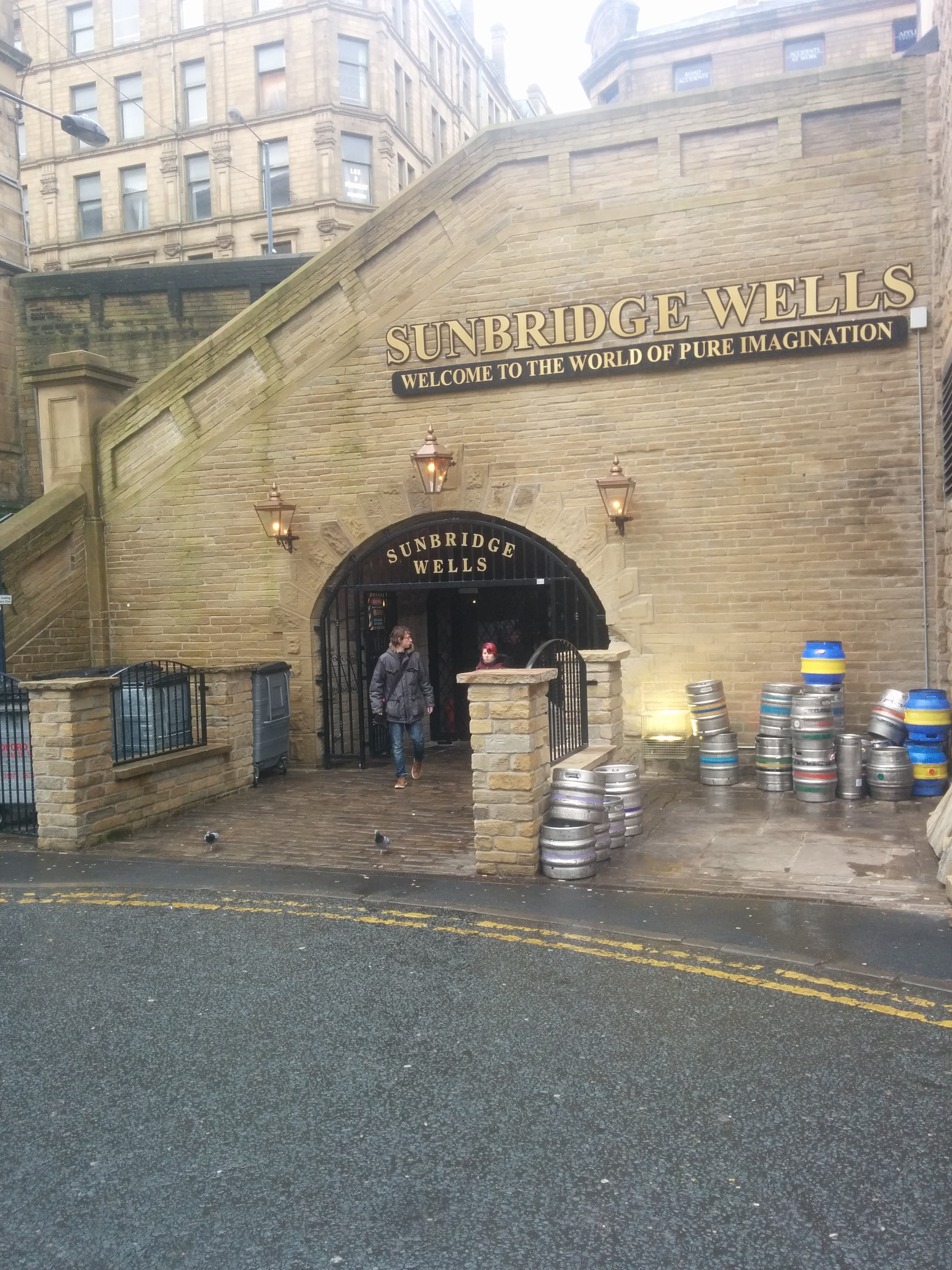
Entrance to the tunnels

Sunbridge Wells is a leisure and shopping facility and tourist attraction built in tunnels in Bradford, West Yorkshire, England. The centre was opened in 2016. It is named after the Kent town Royal Tunbridge Wells due to the former's stereotype of being traditional.

== History ==
The tunnels where the leisure and shopping facility is now was a quarry in the thirteenth century. It was also used as prison cells and during the Second World War was used as an air raid shelter. In the 1960s it was a location for dancing as nightclub The Little Fat Black Pussycat, owned by wrestler Shirley Crabtree, later known as Big Daddy.

The unusual underground development involved the removal of hundreds of tonnes of rubble and it cost £1.9 million to develop and it includes bars and shops. It had originally had a budget of £1 million but this was nearly doubled when the internal area was increased to 24,000 square feet. The stairwells and corridors are decorated in a Victorian style with displays by the Bradford Museums and Art Galleries.

The leisure and shopping facility was opened after some delay by the parents of developer Graham Hall, on 9 December 2016. A further extension to Sunbridge Wells, the Rose and Crown craft beer pub, opened later, The complex now hosts the following Pubs, Bars & Restaurants: Wallers Brewery, La Caverna Pizzeria, The Rose and Crown, Not Guilty Bar, Lina's Coffee Booth and Bar, Mr Pauls, Guilty, Perilla Bar and Kitchen as well Juicy Jerk.
