= Bill Benny =

Theatrical promoter

Bill Benny (1918–1963) was a wrestler known as 'Man Mountain', a theatrical promoter and an owner of nightclubs. He brought Judy Garland to perform in Manchester and met with Elvis Presley in Hollywood in the attempt to arrange a stage appearance in London. As a promoter he worked in partnership with Victor (Vic) Lewis.

== Early career ==
Born in Cornwall in 1918, he was based at the Belle Vue, Manchester entertainment complex early in his wrestling career from around 1939. Briefly in 1952-3 his wrestling persona was a masked character, The Vampire, though he was mostly known as Man Mountain due to his 20-stone weight (280 lbs, 130 kg), a name he kept after retiring from wrestling.

He was one of the founders of the Wrestlers' Welfare Society, an organisation formed during a strike in the 1950s by some wrestlers against Joint Promotions Limited which they claimed was acting as a cartel. The society was to relieve hardship but also acted as an independent employment agency.

== Nightclub owner and theatrical promoter ==
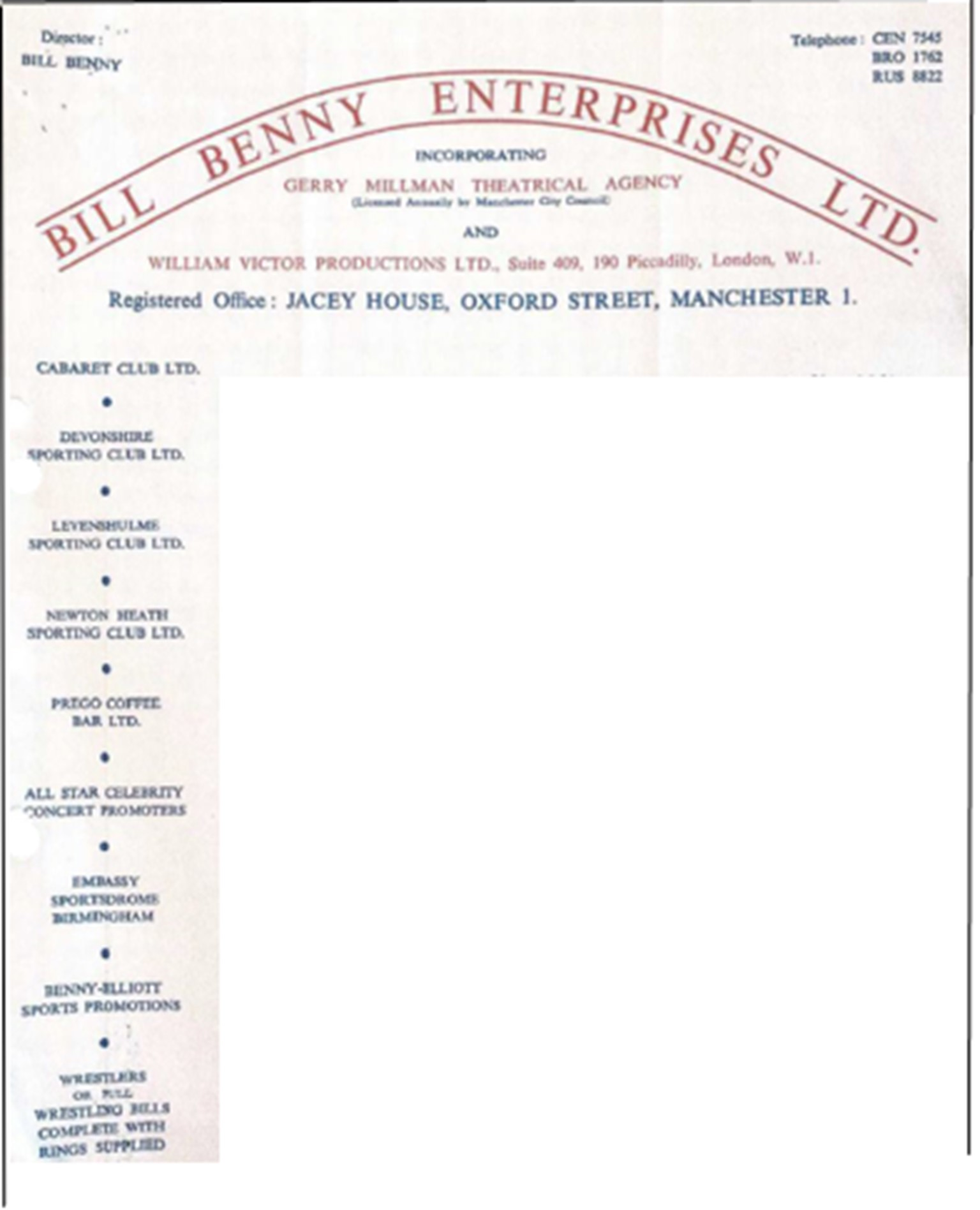
Bill Benny Enterprises headed notepaper (1961)

Reportedly from the mid-1950s he owned The Stork nightclub in Manchester, off Piccadilly. In 1960 he bought the Hulme Hippodrome variety theatre for £35,000 which was used mostly for nude 'revue' shows, selling it 18 months later to Mecca Entertainments for use as a bingo hall.

He had minor roles in two films: High Jinks in Society (1949), and Hell is a City (1960). He was featured in a BBC radio programme, People Today, first broadcast on 18 October 1960 in the Midlands region of the Home Service, then nationally on 1 August 1961.

In 1960 he advertised "An evening with Judy Garland" at the Free Trade Hall, Manchester, first for 5 November and then for 4 December "owing to the unfortunate indisposition of Miss Garland on November 5".

In early 1962 he travelled with Vic Lewis to Hollywood to meet with Elvis Presley and Colonel Tom Parker to discuss a possible charity performance in London, with a photograph of them in the UK press.

== Death ==
He died in Manchester from a heart attack, aged 44 years. Press reports alleged he was a gangster or hustler and linked to the Quality Street Gang.

From accounts in the press and in books later, his sudden death was luridly described in more detail, namely that a young woman who was trapped in a moment of intimacy underneath his heavy body had to reach out and phone the police, who broke in to release her. This account variously was in his office on Oxford Road or at his home in Appleby Lodge, Rusholme, both in Manchester.
