= Atholl Oakeley =

British professional wrestler

Sir Atholl Oakeley, Bt
Personal information
- Born: Edward Atholl Oakeley; 31 May 1900 Rhoscolyn, Anglesey, Wales
- Died: January 1987 (aged 86) Devon, England
- Education: Clifton College; Royal Military Academy Sandhurst
- Children: 2

Professional wrestling career
- Ring name(s): Atholl Oakeley; Captain Athol Oakeley; Edward Oakley; Sir Edward Athol Oakeley
- Billed height: 5 ft 9 in (175 cm)
- Debut: 15 December 1930
- Retired: 1935

Sir Edward Atholl Oakeley, 7th Baronet of Shrewsbury (31 May 1900 – January 1987), known under the ring name Atholl Oakeley, was a British professional wrestler and wrestling promoter who was one of the pioneers of professional wrestling in the United Kingdom. He was Britain's first heavyweight all-in wrestling champion, and held the title from 1930 to 1935. He became the European heavyweight champion in 1932.

== Personal life ==
Oakeley, born Edward Atholl Oakeley, in Rhoscolyn, Anglesey, Wales, was the eldest of four children of Major Edward Francis Oakeley and Lady Everilde Anne Beaumont, and a cousin of Sir Charles Richard Andrew Oakeley, 6th Bt. He was educated at Clifton College and later went on to Royal Military Academy Sandhurst after which he was commissioned in the Oxfordshire and Buckinghamshire Light Infantry. In his younger days Sir Edward was beaten up by a gang of bullies, which in turn inspired him to take up self-defense, specifically amateur wrestling as well as developing his strength and body. Supposedly he drank 11 gallons of milk on a daily basis to increase his muscle mass on the advice of pro wrestler and strongman George Hackenschmidt, although Hackenschmidt later stated that the volume was due to a misunderstanding. Following his retirement from professional wrestling Sir Edward wrote a book about the author R. D. Blackmore and his book Lorna Doone titled The Facts on which R. D. Blackmore based Lorna Doone. He also wrote an autobiography focusing on his wrestling career titled Blue Blood on the Mat. Sir Edward died in January 1987.

== Professional wrestling career ==
A professional wrestling match between Oakeley (white trunks) and "Bulldog" Bill Garnon, circa the early 1930s in London, England

Sir Edward was one of the idea men behind the reintroduction of professional wrestling to the British isles as he, together with Henri Irslinger began promoting All-in professional wrestling in late 1930. Under the ring name Atholl Oakeley he made his debut on 15 December 1930 with a victory over Bert Assirati, a wrestler that Oakeley had a hand in training. Initially Irslinger and Oakeley claimed that their wrestling matches were legitimate sporting competition, trying to keep the illusion that professional wrestling was still an unscripted sport. Given the date, this may have been true for at least some matches, especially since Oakeley attributes the decline of his wrestling promoting to the ability of 'worked' matches to be more sensational. The British Wrestling Association, booked by Irslinger and Oakeley, held a tournament to determine the first British Heavyweight Championship since the turn of the century. Oakeley emerged as the champion after a lengthy tournament. Later on he would also hold the British Light Heavyweight Championship for a period of time between 1930 and 1932. The BWA shows became very popular, with at least 40 regular venues for wrestling in London alone. Oakeley claimed that one event had two million fans in attendance, a claim that was never substantiated as a fact and instead written off as the storyline that often goes with professional wrestling. Oakeley's claim was believed to be as factual as his claim to once have wrestled a 9 ft 0 in (274 cm) opponent. At some point during the early 1930s Oakeley toured Europe, holding the European Heavyweight Championship) Due to the brutal schedule of wrestling over 2,000 matches in his 5-year career Oakeley retired from in ring competition in 1935 vacating the British Heavyweight Championship in the process. Following his retirement he focused on promoting wrestling instead until 1954 where the British Wrestling Association closed its doors. Late in his career Oakeley trained Lord Alfred Hayes for his professional wrestling career.

== Championships and accomplishments ==
- British Wrestling Association
  - British Heavyweight Championship (1 time, first)
  - British Light Heavyweight Championship (1 time)
- European Wrestling
  - European Heavyweight Championship (1 time)

== Bibliography ==
- The Facts on which R. D. Blackmore based Lorna Doone. 1969
- Blue Blood on the Mat. 1971 (Autobiography)

Baronetage of Great Britain
| Preceded by Charles Oakeley | Baronet (of Shrewsbury); 1959–1987 | Succeeded by John Oakeley |
