= Bert Assirati =

British professional wrestler (1908–1990)

Personal information
- Born: Bartolomeo Assirati; 9 July 1908 Holborn, London, England
- Died: 31 August 1990 (aged 82)

Professional wrestling career
- Ring name: Bert Assirati
- Billed height: 5 ft 7 in (1.70 m)
- Billed weight: 240 lb (110 kg; 17 st)
- Trained by: The Snake Pit; Atholl Oakeley
- Debut: 1928
- Retired: 1960

Bartolomeo "Bert" Assirati (9 July 1908 – 31 August 1990), was an English professional wrestler who became a multiple-time British Heavyweight Champion, and, posthumously, a charter member of the Wrestling Observer Newsletter Hall of Fame. He was known for displaying various feats of strength, including setting a British record in 1938 by lying on his back, and pulling over at arm's length a 200-pound barbell. At 240 pounds, Assirati was one of the heaviest men to perform the iron cross.

== Early life ==
Assirati was born in Holborn, London to British-born parents of Italian descent and raised in Clerkenwell.

== Career ==
Assirati began weight-training at the age of twelve. At the age of seventeen, Assirati formed part of the acrobatic stage duo Mello and Nello. Travelling to every port they could reach, the pair performed a variety of hand-balancing acts. At the age of twenty, Assirati began his career as a professional wrestler, but continued to train as a weight-lifter. At his highest weight, he was one of the strongest men in the world, and could still perform such acrobatic maneuvers as the iron cross and a one-arm hand stand. After winning matches, Assirati would perform a standing back flip. In 1938, Assirati deadlifted 800 pounds. He trained for his career in wrestling under Atholl Oakeley.

Assirati was known as a vicious competitor. He is said to have taken pleasure in injuring his opponents, and often refused to play along with the predetermined nature of professional wrestling. Many promoters were reluctant to book him, because of his reputation for double-crossing his opponents, and many wrestlers were said to be afraid to wrestle him. Assirati stated that Lou Thesz was one of the wrestlers afraid to face him. In one version of the story, Assirati challenged Thesz to a match, but Thesz refused. According to Thesz's account in his autobiography, he challenged Assirati for a series of wrestling matches, but Assirati did not respond to his request. Wrestler Les Thornton stated that Assirati's eagerness to hurt people in the ring helped establish credibility for competitors who were willing to face him.

Assirati won his first major championship while competing in the British Wrestling Association (BWA). He had claimed to be the British Heavyweight Champion but did not win the title officially until 27 January 1945. Two years later, he also won the European version of the World Heavyweight Championship by defeating Paul Yvar Martinsen in the final round of a tournament on 18 February 1947. He later dropped this title to Martinson but continued to hold the British Heavyweight Championship. To this, he added the European Heavyweight Championship in 1949 by defeating Felix Miquet. Miquet regained the title belt later that year, however.

In 1950, Assirati left the British Wrestling Association to wrestle in India. As a result, he was stripped of the British Heavyweight Championship. He returned to Europe and won back the European Heavyweight Championship in 1952 after Assirati was chosen to wrestle the long time AWA World Heavyweight Champion Maurice Tillet, The French Angel who was known as Unstoppable, and had won for a span of 19 consecutive months. Tillet's final wrestling match was in Singapore on 14 February 1953, he was working for The National Wrestling Alliance Mid South Area, then known as Tri-State and owned by Leroy McGuirk, and agreed to lose to Bert Assirati because Tillet's health had begun to fail due to being diagnosed with acromegaly at the early age of 20. The condition usually caused by a benign tumor on the pituitary gland, resulting in bone overgrowth and thickening. Because of this Tillet could no longer be advertised as Unstoppable. Shortly after Tillet died on 4 September 1954, in Chicago, from cardiovascular disease. Afterwards Assirati, again, left for India and was forced to vacate the title. In 1955, he won his final championship by defeating Ernie Baldwin for the vacant British Heavyweight Championship. He was stripped of the title in 1958 by Joint Promotions, the governing body, although the British Wrestling Federation (BWF) continued to recognize him as their champion. In 1960 Assirati sustained an injury and the BWF stripped him of the title as well. The championship was awarded to Shirley Crabtree, later better known as Big Daddy. Disgusted with the choice of successor, Assirati began a (non-storyline and unauthorised) campaign of harassment against the new champion at shows until Crabtree retired for six years in 1966.

Later in his life, Bert worked as doorman at the Ebbisham Halls in Epsom, Surrey, especially on the dance nights when many of the top acts of the sixties were playing there. He used to enjoy showing a party trick of placing a metal drink cap between each of the fingers on both hands and completely crush them all at once.

On 31 August 1990, Assirati died of bladder cancer. In 1996, he became one of the first inductees to the Wrestling Observer Newsletter Hall of Fame.

== Championships and accomplishments ==
- British Wrestling Association
  - British Heavyweight Championship (1 time)
- British Wrestling Federation
  - British Heavyweight Championship (1 time)
- International Professional Wrestling Hall of Fame
  - Class of 2023
- Joint Promotions
  - British Heavyweight Championship (1 time)
- Other Titles
  - European Heavyweight Championship (2 time)
  - World Heavyweight Championship(European version) (1 time)
- Wrestling Observer Newsletter
  - Wrestling Observer Newsletter Hall of Fame (Class of 1996)
