= British Mid-Heavyweight Championship =

Professional wrestling championship

Details
- Date established: 1952
- Current champion: Robbie Dynamite
- Date won: 2 October 2009
Statistics
- First champion: Norman Walsh
- Most reigns: Robbie Dynamite (5 reigns)

The British Mid-Heavyweight Championship was a top British wrestling championship found throughout the country's circuit. The title's history dates back to 1952 and runs to the present day. Officially mid-heavyweights were required to weigh between 14 st 2 lb and 14 st 12 lb (89.81 and 94.35 kg). The title was recognised as official by national TV network ITV for the purposes of their coverage of the UK wrestling scene and by its listings magazine TVTimes in accompanying magazine feature coverage.

== Title history ==
The title was founded in 1953 and remained active until 1981 when it was abandoned following the untimely death of incumbent champion Mike Marino. The title was revived in 2002 and his since become a regular feature on the British wrestling circuit.

=== Original title ===
Key
No.	Overall reign number
Reign	Reign number for the specific champion
Days	Number of days held

No.	Champion	Championship change			Reign statistics		Notes	Ref.
No.	Champion	Date	Event	Location	Reign	Days	Notes	Ref.
1	Norman Walsh	1952	House show	N/A	1	N/A		
2	Arthur Riccaldo	1 July 1963	House show	N/A	1	N/A	Won the title after Walsh suffered an injury in their bout	
3	Norman Walsh	August 1963	House show	Middlesbrough	2	N/A		
4	Johnny Allen	December 1964	House show	Middlesbrough	1	N/A		
5	Norman Walsh	1965 (NLT)	House show	Newcastle upon Tyne	3	N/A	Retired as champion in 1965 after a car accident	
6	Geoff Portz	May 1966	House show	Newcastle upon Tyne	1	N/A	Vacates the title due to injury in 1966	
7	Mike Marino	December 1966	House show	Sheffield	1	N/A	Title vacated in August 1981 following Marino's death	

=== Revived title ===
The title was revived in 2002 and has subsequently been defended outside the United Kingdom, an unusual occurrence for a British title.

Key
No.	Overall reign number
Reign	Reign number for the specific champion
Days	Number of days held

No.	Champion	Championship change			Reign statistics		Notes	Ref.
No.	Champion	Date	Event	Location	Reign	Days	Notes	Ref.
1	Robbie Dynamite	April 2002	House show	N/A	1	N/A		
2	Dean Allmark	21 January 2006	House show	Hanley, Staffordshire	1	208		
3	Robbie Dynamite	17 August 2006	House show	Rhyl	2	14		
4	Dean Allmark	31 August 2006	House show	Rhyl	2	211		
5	Robbie Dynamite	30 March 2007	House show	Telford	3	519		
6	Chaos	30 August 2008	House show	Flensburg, Germany	2	21		
7	Robbie Dynamite	20 September 2008	House show	Langå, Denmark	4	261		
8	Dean Allmark	8 June 2009	House show	Rhyl	3	116		
9	Robbie Dynamite	2 October 2009	House show	Birkenhead	5	5,877 +		

== See also ==
- Professional wrestling in the United Kingdom
