= Francis Gregory (sportsman) =

England international rugby league & union footballer, and wrestler

Personal information
- Born: 2 October 1904 St Wenn, England
- Died: 1983 (aged 78–79)

Playing information

Rugby union
Club
Years	Team	Pld	T	G	FG	P
≤1936–≤36	Redruth R.F.C.

Rugby league
- Position: Prop, Second-row
Club
Years	Team	Pld	T	G	FG	P
1936–37	Wigan	49	2			6
1938–46	Warrington	79	6	0	0	18
	Total	128	8	0	0	24
Representative
Years	Team	Pld	T	G	FG	P
1939	England	1	0	0	0	0

Francis Gregory (1904 – 1983), also known as "Francis St. Clair Gregory", was a Cornish wrestler of the 1920s and 1930s, Cornish wrestling referee (stickler) of the 1960s, professional boxer of the 1920s, rugby union footballer who played in the 1920s and 1930s, professional wrestler of the 1930s through to 1963, and professional rugby league footballer who played in the 1930s and 1940s. He played club level rugby union (RU) for Redruth R.F.C., and representative level rugby league (RL) for England, and at club level for Wigan and Warrington, as prop or second-row. Francis Gregory wrestled professionally under the name Francis St. Clair Gregory, his sobriquet of 'St. Clair' is purportedly the name of town in Brittany visited by Cornish wrestlers for wrestling tournaments.

== Background ==
Francis Gregory was born in St Wenn, Cornwall, and his birth was registered in Bodmin, Cornwall.

== Sporting career ==
=== Cornish wrestling ===
Francis Gregory is considered the most notable Cornish Wrestler since the foundation of the Cornish Wrestling Association in 1923, and the last of the "Great" Cornish wrestlers, he was the youngest member of the squad that took part in a two-week-long exhibition to promote Cornish wrestling at the London Palladium in the 1920s, he represented Cornwall as heavyweight champion against Brittany at the first seven Cornu-Breton tournaments, winning on every occasion, including victories over the famous Breton champions; René Scordia and Robert Cadic, he was known as "The Champion Who Never Smiled". He won the Cornish Wrestling Heavyweight Belt every year from 1928 to 1936.

=== Boxing ===
Francis Gregory had four professional boxing contests in 1929.

=== Rugby union ===
Francis Gregory played rugby union for Redruth R.F.C.

=== Rugby league ===
Gregory made his début for Wigan in the 17–11 victory over Oldham at Central Park, Wigan on Saturday 29 August 1936, scored his first try for Wigan in the 11–9 victory over Broughton Rangers at Central Park, Wigan on Saturday 14 November 1936, scored his last try for Wigan in the 37–17 victory over Halifax at Central Park, Wigan on Wednesday 17 February 1937, and he played his last match for Wigan in the 10–2 victory over Hull F.C. at Central Park, Wigan on Saturday 30 October 1937.

Gregory played at second-row in Leeds 15–10 victory over Halifax in the 1941–42 Challenge Cup Final at Odsal Stadium, Bradford, on Saturday 6 June 1942.

Gregory won a cap for England (RL) while at Warrington in 1939 against Wales.

=== Professional wrestling ===
Francis Gregory appeared on the first televised wrestling match in the United Kingdom, a bout against Mike Marino at West Ham Municipal Baths (now Atherton Leisure Centre) on Wednesday 9 November 1955.

== Personal life ==
Francis Gregory was the father of the professional wrestlers, Roy St. Clair, and Tony St. Clair.

== Outside of sport ==
Francis Gregory was the landlord of a pub in Manchester c. 1965.
