= Joe D'Orazio =

British professional wrestler and referee (1922–2022)

Personal information
- Born: 27 July 1922 Bermondsey, London, England
- Died: 9 March 2022 (aged 99)

Professional wrestling career
- Ring name(s): Joe D'Orazio; Kito Tani; Mario Maldoon; Bob Scala

Joe D'Orazio (27 July 1922 – 9 March 2022) was a British professional wrestler from the golden era. He was also a well known referee, presiding over bouts held in Blenheim Palace, Olympia, Cafe Royal & Lyceum Ballroom (London), Paisley Ice Rink, Paris, Belgium, Big Top Berlin and Big Top Hanover, King Hussein Stadium Jordan and Italy. For 20 years Joe D'Orazio was resident referee at the Royal Albert Hall tournaments.

== Early life ==
D'Orazio was born in Bermondsey, South London, on 27 July 1922, to Italian parents. Growing up he attended The English Martyrs RC Primary School where he met fellow wrestler and best friend Steve Logan. As a boy, Joe worked in his father's fish and chip shop on the Old Kent Road. After leaving school he worked as part of a demolition squad, knocking down old buildings. Shortly after the commencement of The Second World War he joined The Royal Air force alongside the wrestler Vic Coleman. In 1948 he became a professional wrestler alongside his cousin Mike Marino, who was already an established wrestler. His first professional performance took place against New Zealander Russ Bishop.

== Other accomplishments ==
Other than being a wrestler, Joe is also an accomplished painter, writer, actor and stunt man. In September 1971 Joe featured on a double-page spread on pages 14 and 15 in the TVTimes where he was interviewed about his love of poetry. He appeared regularly on ITV's World of Sport (UK TV series) and featured in films such as The Reckoning (1969 film). He worked as a stunt man in films such as The Camp on Blood Island. He has also devoted over 60 years of his life teaching adults with learning difficulties to paint and draw.

Joe often appeared in magazines such as 'The Wrestler' and would often write many of the articles under the name of 'Bob Scala'.

In 1971 he released a book entitled "Who's Who of Wrestling" and in July 2017 in order to celebrate his 95th birthday he released a poetry book entitled "A Wrestler's Lament". In July 2018 Joe released another book entitled "Memories", containing further poems and a short story. Many of the poems in his latest two books were written whilst he was still a professional wrestler, although some were written in the lead up to publishing his book.

In 1991, D'Orazio co-founded the British Wrestlers Reunion and remained their president until January 2022. The organisation was the second largest of its kind in the world with over 5,000 members and ran for 30 years but came to an end when D'Orazio retired from his role.

D'Orazio was quoted as a reference on many topics in the book The Wrestling by Simon Garfield.

== Personal life ==
D'Orazio died on 9 March 2022, at the age of 99.
