= Mike Marino =

British professional wrestler (1921 – 1981)

Personal information
- Born: Michael Harrison; 8 October 1921 London, England, United Kingdom
- Died: 24 August 1981 (aged 59) Folkestone, England

Professional wrestling career
- Ring name: Mike Marino
- Billed weight: 13 st 4 lb (84.4 kg)
- Billed from: Streatham
- Debut: 1951

Michael Harrison (8 October 1921 – 24 August 1981), better known under the ring name Mike Marino, was an English professional wrestler and a leading name during the World of Sport era in British wrestling. At his death Marino was holder of the three Mid-Heavyweight titles active in Britain at the time. Mike Marino was cousin to fellow wrestler Joe D'Orazio

== Wrestling career ==
Born in London of Italian extraction, Marino initially turned to boxing as a Cruiserweight. However unable to obtain a licence to box in the United Kingdom, he spent his entire career in mainland Europe. He turned to wrestling in the early 1950s and came to prominence after winning an international tournament in Paris in 1951. Mike Marino appeared on the first televised wrestling match in the United Kingdom, a bout against Francis Gregory at West Ham Municipal Baths (now Atherton Leisure Centre) on Wednesday 9 November 1955.

Marino won the World Mid-Heavyweight Championship in 1957 and went on to hold the title four times. The European Mid-Heavyweight Championship was added in 1967, although his claim was for a time disputed Bill Howes, with Marino eventually relinquishing his claim until Howes retirement. He eventually added the British Mid-Heavyweight Championship, winning the title in December 1966 and holding it until his death in 1981. Marino held all three belts when he died.

A regular on the main shows at the Royal Albert Hall, Marino was recognised as one of British wrestling's leading technicians of the era. He gained the nickname 'Mr. Wrestling' due to his ability and his length of service. Nonetheless Marino was one of a number of wrestlers to be caught up in a 'tabloid exposé' when in 1972 the News of the World published the transcripts of a dressing room conversation between Marino and his opponent Albert 'Rocky' Wall discussing how their upcoming match would be arranged. With British wrestling still operating full kayfabe, such stories exposing the scripted nature of the sport were common in the tabloids at the time.

== Death ==
Marino died in August 1981 whilst returning to his South London home from a tournament in Folkestone. He had been booked to wrestle Big Jim Harris at the town's Leas Cliff Hall but after being adjudged unable to perform was taken to Ashford Hospital where he was treated for a swollen tongue. Marino discharged himself the same night and left with fellow wrestler Mal Sanders but suffered from a convulsive attack as they travelled on the M20 motorway. He died by the roadside and was afterwards revealed to have been suffering from leukemia. A Mike Marino Memorial Shield was later contested, with Sanders winning the inaugural tournament.

== Championships and accomplishments ==
- Joint Promotions
  - World Mid-Heavyweight Championship (4 times)
  - European Mid-Heavyweight Championship (1 time)
  - British Mid-Heavyweight Championship (1 time)
