= Professional wrestling in the United Kingdom =

Footage of a professional wrestling match taking place in Manchester, England in 1937

The history of professional wrestling in the United Kingdom spans over one hundred years. After a brief spell of popularity for professional Greco-Roman wrestling wrestling during the Edwardian era, the first catch-as-catch-can based scene began in the 1930s, when it was popularised under the concept of "All-in Wrestling", which emphasised an "anything goes" style and presentation. Following World War II, the style and presentation of professional wrestling in the UK underwent a dramatic shift, as the Admiral-Lord Mountevans rules were introduced to make British professional wrestling appear much closer to a legitimate sport. Professional wrestling entered the mainstream British culture when the newly formed independent television network ITV began broadcasting it in 1955, on Saturday afternoons and then also in a late-night midweek slot. Domestically produced professional wrestling was at its peak of popularity when the television show World of Sport was launched in the mid-1960s, making household names out of Adrian Street, Mick McManus, Giant Haystacks, Jackie Pallo, Big Daddy, Mark Rocco, Steve Veidor, Dynamite Kid, and Kendo Nagasaki.

An upmarket rebrand of ITV's sports coverage, alongside the entry of the American World Wrestling Federation into the market in the late 1980s, contributed to a decline in support for domestic British wrestling and stars. In 1985, World of Sport ended, and a subsequent stand-alone wrestling programme lasted until the end of 1988. Without mainstream television access, domestically produced professional wrestling would struggle in the United Kingdom. Nonetheless, the largely untelevised live circuit survived and at times thrived with some promotions featuring the traditional British style of wrestling, while others adopted the contemporary American independent style.

In the 21st century, mirroring the growing strength of the Independent circuit in the United States, support for domestic professional wrestling once again began to grow, leading to the rise of several prominent and stable independent wrestling promotions throughout the United Kingdom, notably Revolution Pro Wrestling and Progress Wrestling. This, combined with strategic partnerships with Japanese professional wrestling promotions, allowed for a new generation of professional wrestlers such as Will Ospreay, Zack Sabre Jr. and Pete Dunne to rise to prominence internationally.

== History ==
=== Folk-wrestling roots and Greco Roman wrestling boom ===
For many centuries, there have been wrestling tournaments (for example in Cornish wrestling, Lancashire wrestling or Scottish Backhold) throughout the British Isles where individual prizes have been comparable to yearly salaries and where monarchs and lords have been in the audiences or indeed participated.

At the start of the 20th century, wrestling was introduced to the public as part of a variety act to spice up the limited action involved in the bodybuilder strongman attractions. One of its earliest stars was a Cornish-American ex-miner named Jack Carkeek (world Cornish wrestling champion in 1886), who would challenge audience members to last ten minutes with him in the ring.

The development of wrestling within the UK brought legitimate Greco-Roman grappler Georg Hackenschmidt who was born in the Russian Empire to the country, where he would quickly associate himself with promoter and entrepreneur Charles B. Cochran. Cochran took Hackenschmidt under his wing and booked him into a match in which Hackenschmidt defeated another top British wrestler, Tom Cannon, for the European Greco-Roman Heavyweight Championship. This win gave Hackenschmidt a credible claim to the world title, cemented in 1905 with a win over American Heavyweight Champion Tom Jenkins in the United States. Hackenschmidt took a series of bookings in Manchester for a then impressive £150 a week. Noting Hackenschmidt's legitimately dominant style of wrestling threatened to kill crowd interest, Cochran persuaded Hackenschmidt to learn showmanship from Cannon and wrestle many of his matches for entertainment rather than sport; this displayed the future elements of "sports entertainment".

Numerous big-name stars came and went during the early inception of wrestling within the UK, with many, like Hackenschmidt, leaving for the US. The resulting loss of big-name stars sent the business into decline before the outbreak of World War I in 1914 halted it completely.

=== 1930s: All-in wrestling ===
A professional wrestling match between Atholl Oakeley and "Bulldog" Bill Garnon, circa the early 1930s in London, England. In this match, Oakeley and Garnon emphasise a grappling-based style intended to suggest the match is a legitimate wrestling contest rather than a performance.

While various styles of amateur wrestling continued as legitimate sports, grappling as a promotional business did not return to Britain until the beginning of the 1930s when the success of the more worked aspects of professional wrestling in America, like gimmickry and showmanship, were introduced to British wrestling. It was with this revival that the more submission-based Catch As Catch Can wrestling style, which had already replaced Greco Roman wrestling as the dominant style of professional wrestling in the United States back in the 1890s, became the new dominant style in Britain. With Lancashire style catch-as-catch-can already a major amateur sport particularly in Northern England, there existed a ready-made source of potential recruits to professional wrestling.

Amateur wrestler, Sir Atholl Oakeley got together with fellow grappler Henry Irslinger to launch one of the first promotions to employ the new style of wrestling which was coined "All-in" wrestling. Though, like many wrestlers throughout the business, Oakeley would claim his wrestling was entirely legitimate, his claim was highly dubious. Under the British Wrestling Association banner, Oakeley's promotion took off with wrestlers such as Tommy Mann, Black Butcher Johnson, Jack Pye, Norman "the Butcher" Ansell, "College Boy", and Jack Sherry on the roster, while Oakeley himself would win a series of matches to be crowned the first British Heavyweight Champion.

The business was reaching one of its highest points at the time, with the best part of forty regular venues in London alone. The great demand for wrestling, however, meant there were not enough skilled amateurs to go around, and many promoters switched to more violent styles, with weapons and chairshots part of the proceedings. Women wrestlers and mud-filled rings also became common place. In the late 1930s, the London County Council banned professional wrestling, leaving the business in rough shape just before World War II.

=== 1940s: Mountevans' committee ===
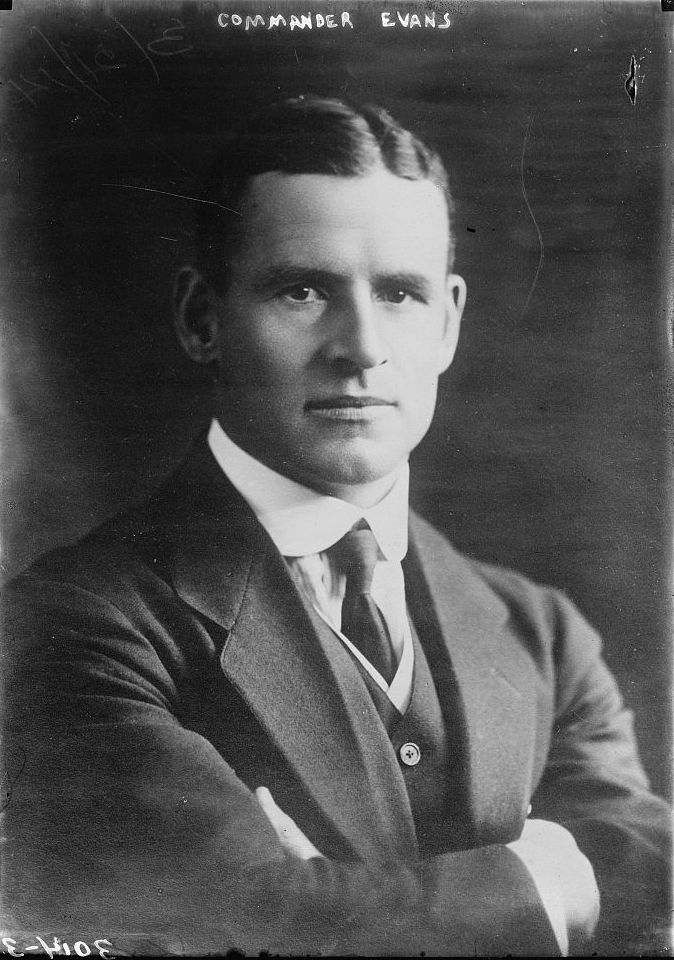
Baron Mountevans headed up a committee which created rules for British professional wrestling. These rules were used to legitimatise wrestling to the public as an actual sport, but their actual purpose was to radically alter the style of presentation used.

After the war, attempts to re-launch the business in 1947 failed to catch on with journalists, who condemned the gimmickry of professional wrestling as "fake". The revelation of this, and the general chaos which had surrounded "All In" Wrestling prior to the War prompted Admiral Lord Mountevans, a fan of the sport, to collaborate with Commander Campbell (a member of the popular The Brains Trust radio panel show), member of parliament Maurice Webb and Olympic wrestler Norman Morell to create a committee to produce official rules for wrestling. These rules became known as Admiral-Lord Mountevans rules.

The most notable action of the committee was to create seven formal weight divisions, calling for champions to be crowned at each weight. These weight divisions included lightweight (154-pound limit), welterweight (165), middleweight (176), heavy middleweight (187), light heavyweight (198), mid heavyweight (209), and heavyweight. Many of these rules diverged heavily from those used in American Wrestling – five-minute rounds (three minutes for title matches), two public warnings for rule breaking before a disqualification, "knockouts" (countouts) and disqualifications counting as automatic two falls in best of three falls matches (which were predominant), and no follow-up moves allowed on a grounded opponent. Similar rule systems were adopted by most major promotions in mainland Western Europe (although French wrestling abandoned rounds early on.)

The existence of the committee was readily acknowledged by promoters who used its existence to counter any accusations of wrongdoings within the business. It was the promoters themselves, however, who revolutionized the business. During this time, under the guise of an alliance of promoters attempting to regulate the sport and uphold the committee's ideas, the promoters created a cartel based on America's National Wrestling Alliance territory system that was designed to carve up control of the business among a handful of promoters—which it did in 1952 under the name of Joint Promotions.

=== Joint Promotions ===
Joint Promotions/ Ring Wrestling Stars
- Type: Private 1969–1995; Cartel 1952–1969
- Industry: Professional wrestling, sports entertainment
- Founded: 1952 (cartel formed as Joint Promotions); 1969 (merged into single company after buyout); 1991 (rebrand as Ring Wrestling Stars)
- Defunct: 1995
- Fate: Retirement of final owner
- Headquarters: London, Bradford, Halifax
- Key people: Max Crabtree (owner 1986–1995); William Hill PLC (corporate owner early 1970s-1986); Jarvis Astaire (owner 1969 – early 1970s); Jack & John Dale, Les Martin, Billy Best, Arthur Wryton, Norman Morrell, Ted Beresford, George de Relwyskow, Arthur Green (partners in cartel 1952–1969)

Joint Promotions was represented in London by the Dale Martin promotion, which had incorporated in 1948, and involved Les Martin, and the brothers Jack, Johnny and Billy Dale. Other promoters included Norman Morell and Ted Beresford in Yorkshire, Billy Best in Liverpool, Arthur Wright in Manchester and George de Relwyskow in Scotland, with Arthur Green the secretary of the group. By agreeing to rotate talent and block out rival promoters, Joint Promotions was soon running 40 shows a week, while leaving wrestlers with little bargaining power. The financial advantages of this arrangement helped the members survive the tough conditions caused by a post-war tax that took 25% of all entertainment revenue. Other promoters were not so successful. The closure of Harringay Arena in 1954 was the last straw for Atholl Oakeley, and Joint Promotions were the only major player left to benefit when Chancellor Peter Thorneycroft abolished the entertainment tax in the 1957 budget.

From a press report, some wrestlers decided to go on strike against the Joint Promotions cartel and formed the Wrestlers' Welfare Society for hardship relief but also to act as an employment agency. Bill Benny ('Man Mountain', 1918, Cornwall - 1963, Manchester) wrestler, promoter and nightclubs owner, was a founder and was quoted, "We're the pirates".

One of Joint Promotions' first moves was establishing (and controlling) the championships called for by the Mountevans' committee. At first, this proved a profitable venture, with title matches leading to raised ticket prices. However, perhaps inevitably, attempts to extend this success by bringing in additional titles led to overexposure. While the World and British titles had some credibility (particularly as they were often placed on the more legitimate wrestlers), the addition of European, Empire/Commonwealth, Scottish, Welsh, and area championships got out of hand, and at one point there were conceivably 70 different titleholders to keep track of within Joint Promotions alone. In practice, the British, European and World titles were given most prominence. The "regional" titles were mainly honorific, with only the "southern Area" titles actually being fought for. The Empire/Commonwealth titles were a "long stop" title, being used by promotions outside of the Joint monopoly, for the most part.

=== 1950s: Introduction of British wrestling to television audiences ===
But while titles had some success, it was television that took British wrestling to the next level. The first show aired on ABC and ATV (the weekend franchise holders on ITV) on 9 November 1955, featuring Francis St Clair Gregory (9 times Cornish wrestling heavyweight title holder and father of Tony St Clair) versus Mike Marino and Cliff Beaumont versus Bert Royal live from West Ham baths. The show was successful, and wrestling became a featured attraction every Saturday afternoon from autumn to spring each year. In 1964, it went full-time as part of the World of Sport sports compilation programme.

Televised wrestling allowed wrestlers to become household names and allowed personality and skill to get a wrestler over just as much as size. The exposure of wrestling on television proved the ultimate boost to the live event business as wrestling became part of mainstream culture. By the mid-1960s, Joint Promotions had doubled their live event schedule to somewhere in the region of 4,500 shows a year. Every town of note had a show at least once a month, and at some points more than 30 cities had a weekly date.

The style of wrestling at the time was unique – not only in terms of the rule system, but also for the strong emphasis on clean technical wrestling. Heels made up a minority of the roster, with most shows containing an abnormally high proportion of clean sportsmanly matches between two "blue-eyes" (as faces were known backstage in the UK). This continued for several decades. Gimmick matches were a rarity, and midget wrestling failed to catch on, while women were banned by the Greater London Council until the late 1980s. Tag wrestling, however, did prove to be popular, with televised tag matches happening a mere eight or so times a year to keep them special.

The success of wrestling on television did however create a better opportunity for the independent groups. The opposition to Joint came from the Australian-born promoter, Paul Lincoln. Having promoted shows in the 1950s with himself in the main event as masked heel Doctor Death, Lincoln led a consortium of independent promoters under the British Wrestling Federation (BWF) whose name was used for a rival championship, built around Heavyweight champion Bert Assirati who split away from Joint Promotions in 1958 while still champion. Although Joint Promotions considered the title vacant and held a tournament for a new champion (won by Billy Joyce), Assirati continued to claim it within the BWF.

The group later built itself around a new champion in Shirley Crabtree, a young bodybuilder who won the title after it was vacated by Assirati while injured in 1960. The BWF faded away in the late 1960s after a campaign by a disgruntled Assirati (vastly superior as a shooter to Crabtree) in the form of unsolicited appearances and challenges to his successor at BWF shows, eventually resulting in the abrupt retirement of Crabtree in 1966. Lincoln's own promotion was bought out and amalgamated into Joint Promotions at the end of the 1960s.

=== 1970s–1980s: Max Crabtree and Big Daddy ===
By 1975, the stranglehold of Joint Promotions had almost crumbled, with many of its founding members retiring and the company being bought out several times, leading to the wrestling industry being run as a private subsidiary of state-run bookmakers William Hill PLC, a public company whose staff had little experience of the unique business. Finally, promotions were left in the hands of Max Crabtree, the brother of Shirley, who was headhunted by Joint as the most experienced booker still in the business.

Crabtree produced the next boom in British wrestling by creating the legend of Big Daddy, the alter ego of Shirley, who had been unemployed for the best part of 6 years before joining Joint in 1972 as the heel "Battling Guardsman" and then being rebranded as Big Daddy two years later. After an initial transition period as a heel/tweener in the mid-1970s (most notable for his tag team partnership with future arch-rival Giant Haystacks and a heel vs heel feud with legendary masked wrestler Kendo Nagasaki, whom Daddy unmasked during a 1975 televised bout), from the summer of 1977 onwards, Big Daddy became a larger-than-life fan favourite of children and pensioners alike. That he was no longer a bodybuilder youth, rather an overweight man in his forties, did not seem to be an obstacle as every major heel in the country was defeated by Daddy. This was usually in short order with Daddy gaining quick wins in his few singles matches and cleaning up quickly when tagged into his more frequent tag matches. Disgruntled contemporaries such as Adrian Street have attributed this to Shirley's lack of conditioning, although Max in response insisted that this was what people wanted to see.

Big Daddy became one of the best-known wrestlers in British history and even had his own comic strip in Buster comic. Due to his popularity, Crabtree's run was extended by carefully positioning him in tag matches, allowing a host of young partners (which included Young David, Dynamite Kid, Chris Adams, Sammy Lee, Kwik Kick Lee and Steve Regal) to carry the match before tagging Daddy in for the finish.

Basing a whole cartel around one performer, however, though good for television, produced mixed results for live events. While Big Daddy was a massive draw in terms of family audiences, in equal part he alienated much of the existing adult fanbase for wrestling. Many wrestlers shared the adult fans' dislike of the Big Daddy phenomenon. They were dissatisfied with their position within the Joint Promotions and soon looked elsewhere for exposure mainly outside the UK as a whole. As a result, there was a rise in New Japan Pro-Wrestling and Stampede Wrestling's junior-heavyweight divisions, both of which had their roots in British wrestling of the time.

=== 1980s–1990s: End of ITV era and aftermath ===
One English promoter that benefited from the backlash against the Crabtrees was Merseyside promoter Brian Dixon, operator of All Star Wrestling which began capitalizing on this disaffection by taking many of Joint Promotions' top stars and running shows head to head with them on the same night in the same town.

Professional wrestling as a whole seemingly began to fall into disarray as the true nature of wrestling began to fall into question as many newspapers tried to expose the worked aspects of the sport. However, this trend did not ultimately harm the industries as the suspension of disbelief was all too easy to maintain for fans, even if they knew the truth. On 28 September 1985, the Crabtrees received another blow when World of Sport was taken off the air. Wrestling instead got its own show, but the time slot changed from week to week, slowly driving away the regular audience. Far worse for Joint Promotions, however, was that with their contract up for renewal at the start of 1987, they were forced to share the TV rights as part of a rotation system with All Star Wrestling and America's World Wrestling Federation (WWF).

The introduction of American wrestling to the UK and the eventual axing in 1988 by Greg Dyke of Wrestling shows on terrestrial TV saw the eclipse of Joint Promotions from its dominant position in the British wrestling scene. The promotion, renamed Ring Wrestling Stars (RWS) in 1991, continued to tour the old venues with Big Daddy in the headline slot until his retirement in December 1993 after suffering a stroke. Even then, Max Crabtree continued to tour, using the same business model, with British-born former WWF star "British Bulldog" Davey Boy Smith replacing Daddy as the headlining household name, until Smith was lured back to the WWF in the summer of 1994. Thereafter, RWS went into decline and eventually ceased promoting in February 1995 upon Max's retirement.

By contrast, All Star had used its two years of TV exposure to build up a returning Kendo Nagasaki as its lead heel and established such storylines as his tag team-cum-feud with Rollerball Rocco and his "hypnotism" of Robbie Brookside. The end of TV coverage left many of these storylines at a cliffhanger and consequently, All Star underwent a box office boom as hardcore fans turned up to live shows to see what happened next, and kept coming for several years due to careful use of show-to-show storylines. Headline matches frequently pitted Nagasaki in violent heel vs heel battles against the likes of Rocco, Dave 'Fit' Finlay, Skull Murphy (Peter Northey) and even Giant Haystacks, or at smaller venues teaming with regular partner "Blondie" Bob Barrett to usually defeat blue-eye opposition.

Many British wrestlers also continued to appear on television, alongside French, German and other talent, via France's TV show New Catch which originally debuted on French terrestrial channel TF1 in 1988. A repeat run of the 1988 season and a second run of new editions were screened 1991-1992 on satellite channel Eurosport after it was bought out by TF1 (with four sampler episodes also screened on TF1). All Star's post-television boom wore off after 1993 when Nagasaki retired for a second time. However, the promotion kept afloat on live shows at certain established venues and particularly on the holiday camp circuit and remains active right up to the present.

Meanwhile, the WWF continued on Sky television, while its chief rival back home in America, World Championship Wrestling (WCW) made the jump from late-night ITV to British Wrestling's old Saturday afternoon ITV timeslot, where it stayed until moving to Super Channel at the end of 1995 and then Channel 5 on Friday evenings from mid-1999 until WCW's demise in 2001. Both major 1990s US promotions made several arena tours of the UK while the WWF held the pay-per-view event SummerSlam 1992 in London's Wembley Stadium before a crowd of around 80,000.

=== 1990s–2000s: "Old school" and "New school" ===
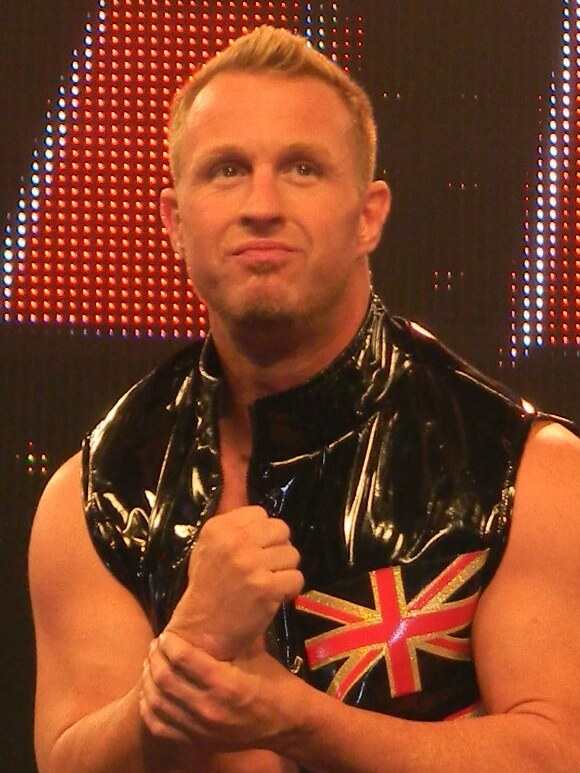
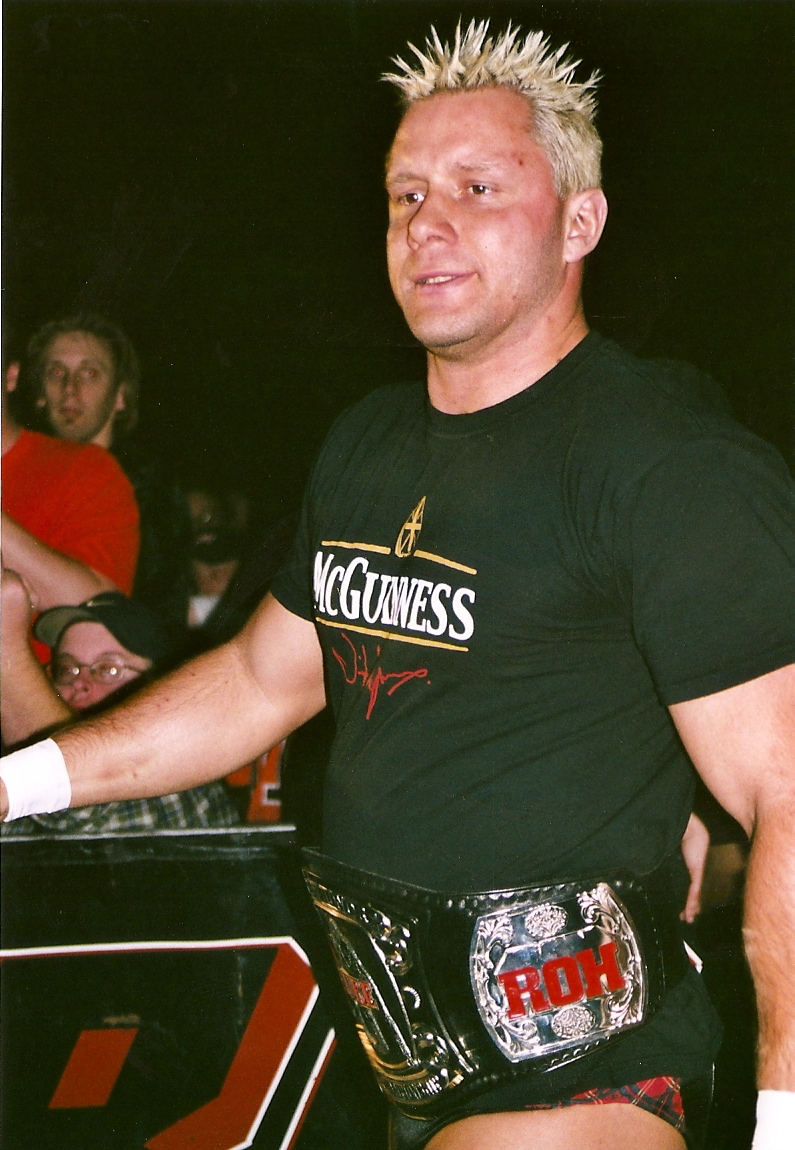
Prominent British wrestlers in the 2000s included Doug Williams and Nigel McGuinness; they characterised a new generation of performers who would split their time between the UK and the United States.

Following the demise of Joint Promotions and the mid-1990s slowdown at All Star, several of British wrestling's old mainstay attractions chose to retire, while many younger stars such as Steve Regal and Dave Taylor as well as veterans like Finlay and Haystacks emigrated to the United States to continue their careers. Nevertheless, several independent promoters attempted to capture what remained of the domestic market. Some, such as All Star, Steve Barker's Rumble Wrestling (active 1984-2001 and 2019-present) John Freemantle's Premier Promotions (active 1987-present), and Scott Conway's The Wrestling Alliance (TWA, active 1986–2003), continued to preserve the traditional British wrestling style while many newly created promotions rejected the Mountevans rules and technical style of wrestling entirely in favour of the American variant. Features such as timed rounds and multiple falls were dropped in favour of American "one fall to a finish" matches.

Conditions in the British scene would remain at a low ebb (with some smaller promoters resorting to "WWF tribute" shows (Note: These shows saw British wrestlers performing as imitations of WWE characters, something considered highly unusual and frowned upon within professional wrestling. Acts included the "UK Undertaker" and the "Big Red Machine" who imitated the Undertaker and Kane. One such tribute performer, "British Bushwhacker" Frank Casey, eventually teamed with his originals The Bushwhackers in "triple tag" (six-man tag) matches when they toured the UK in 2000.)) until the early-2000s, when a new generation of domestic stars would emerge, amongst them Doug Williams and Nigel McGuinness, who would split their time between performing in the United Kingdom and appearing for American promotions such as Total Nonstop Action Wrestling (TNA). For example, TNA's "2004 X Cup" featured All Star Wrestling wrestlers James Mason, Dean Allmark, Robbie Dynamite and Frankie Sloan as Team Britain while McGuinness would become highly prominent in Ring of Honor (ROH), first as their ROH Pure Champion in 2005 before becoming their ROH World Champion in 2007. In addition to British stars increasingly performing in the US, likewise, this period saw the increasing use of American stars on British shows. These included on the one hand fashionable US independent stars like Sabu and Rob Van Dam guesting on showcase events by Americanised promotions and on the other hand, veterans of the WWF Golden Era touring for All Star and TWA with tribute performers being gradually replaced by the ageing genuine articles. There was also an increasing degree of crossover between the traditional-style "Old School" and Americanised "New School" promotions after one of the latter, Frontier Wrestling Alliance featured an invasion storyline featuring traditional veterans from the former faction.

New promotions such as One Pro Wrestling and the FWA commonly featured a mixture of British and American performers, beginning a trend that would continue for the decades to come. By the early 2010s, wrestling stars such as PAC, Britani Knight, and Martin Stone continued to gravitate towards immigrating to the United States, however not before having spent several years performing in the UK first. Digital TV channel The Wrestling Channel, later rebranded The Fight Network, ran for five years in the United Kingdom combining worldwide wrestling programming with coverage of selected current British promotions as well as extensive rescreenings of vintage 1970s/1980s ITV footage (branded as World of Sport after the segment's parent show), exposing the history of British wrestling to a new younger audience. After the channel's 2008 closure, the repeats continued on other stations such as Men and Movies. Much of this footage, as well as original ITV broadcasts of matches, has since been uploaded to YouTube, further expanding classic British wrestling's outreach to international wrestling fandom.

=== 2010s: Japan talent exchanges / Attempts to return to ITV and WWE's NXT UK ===
New wrestling promotions such as Progress Wrestling and Revolution Pro Wrestling were able to garner partnerships with Japanese promotions such as New Japan Pro Wrestling. Through these partnerships, professional wrestlers such as Zack Sabre Jr and Will Ospreay were able to split their time between performing in the UK and Japan, helping to develop their prominence in both countries Other independent wrestling promotions launched in this period were Riot Cabaret, TNT Extreme Wrestling, Welsh promotion Attack! Pro Wrestling, Scottish promotion Insane Championship Wrestling and the all-women promotion Pro-Wrestling: EVE.

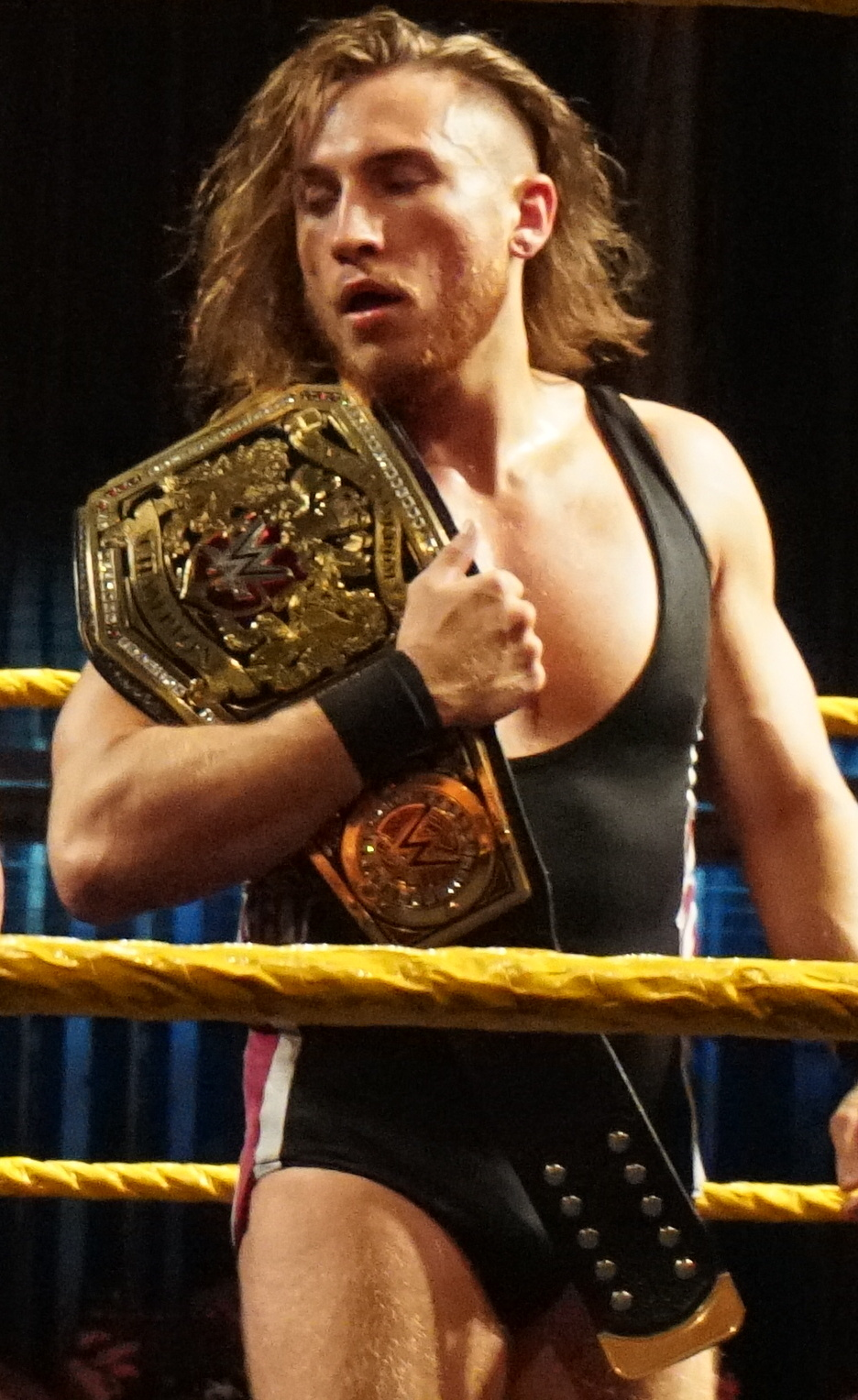
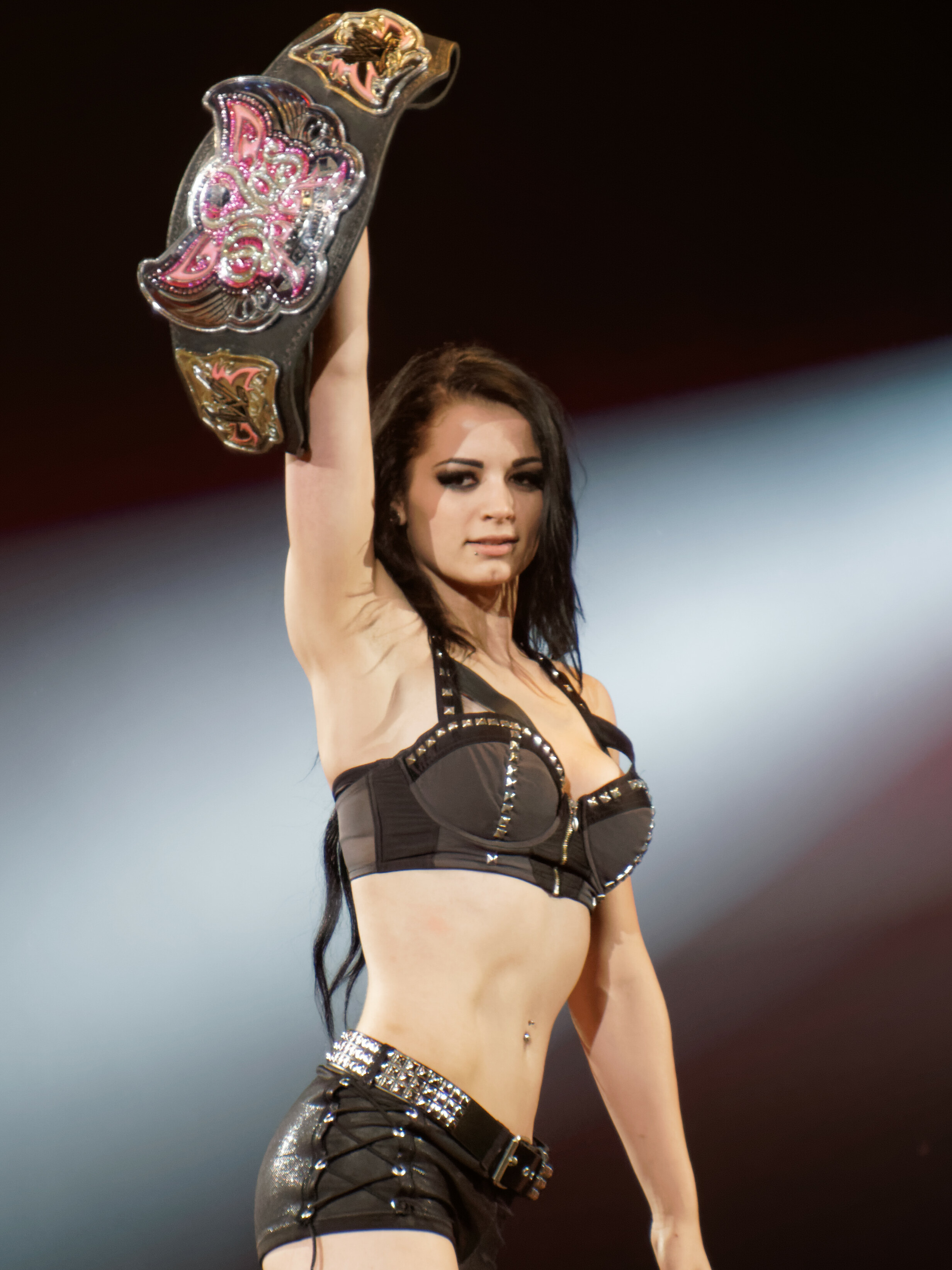
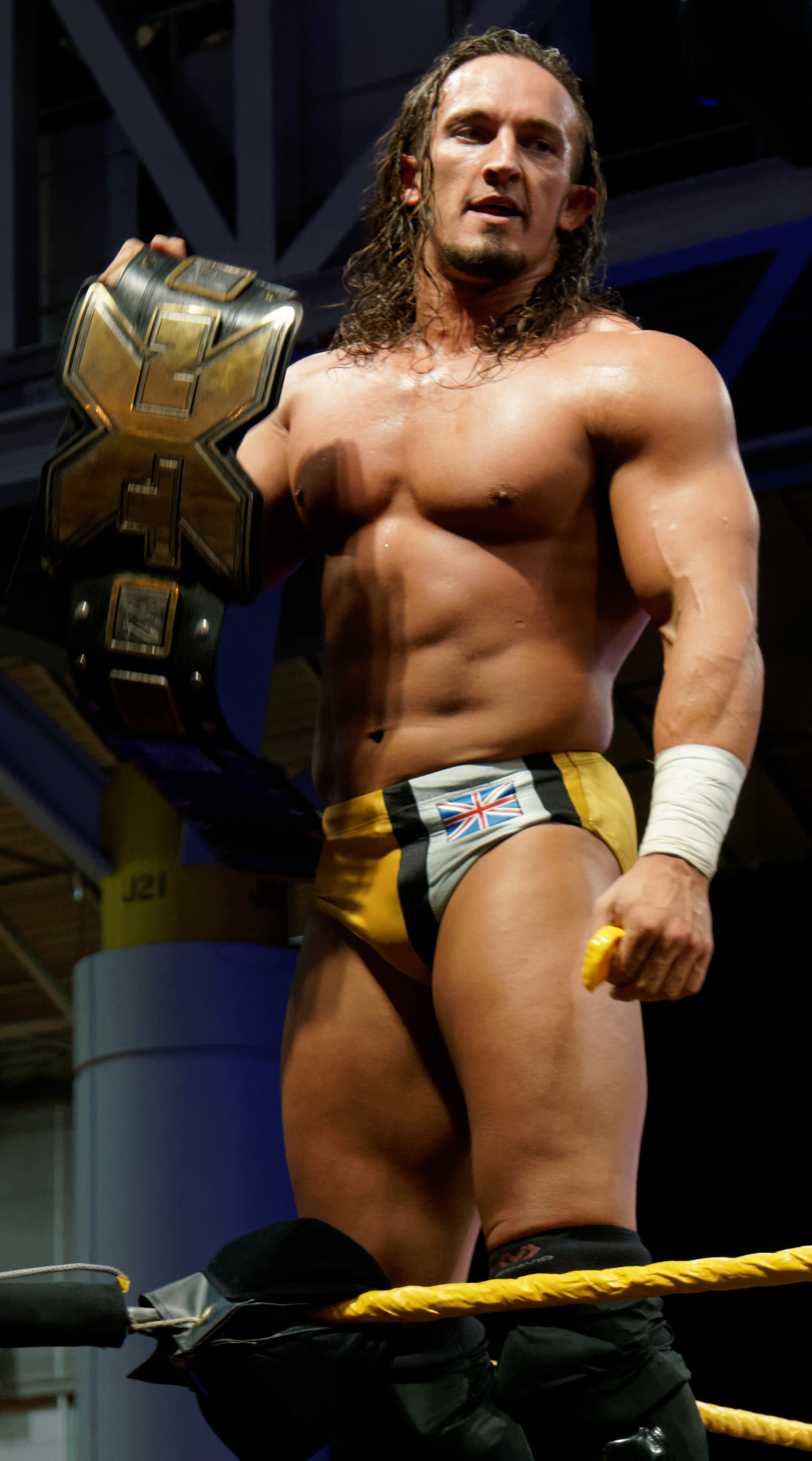
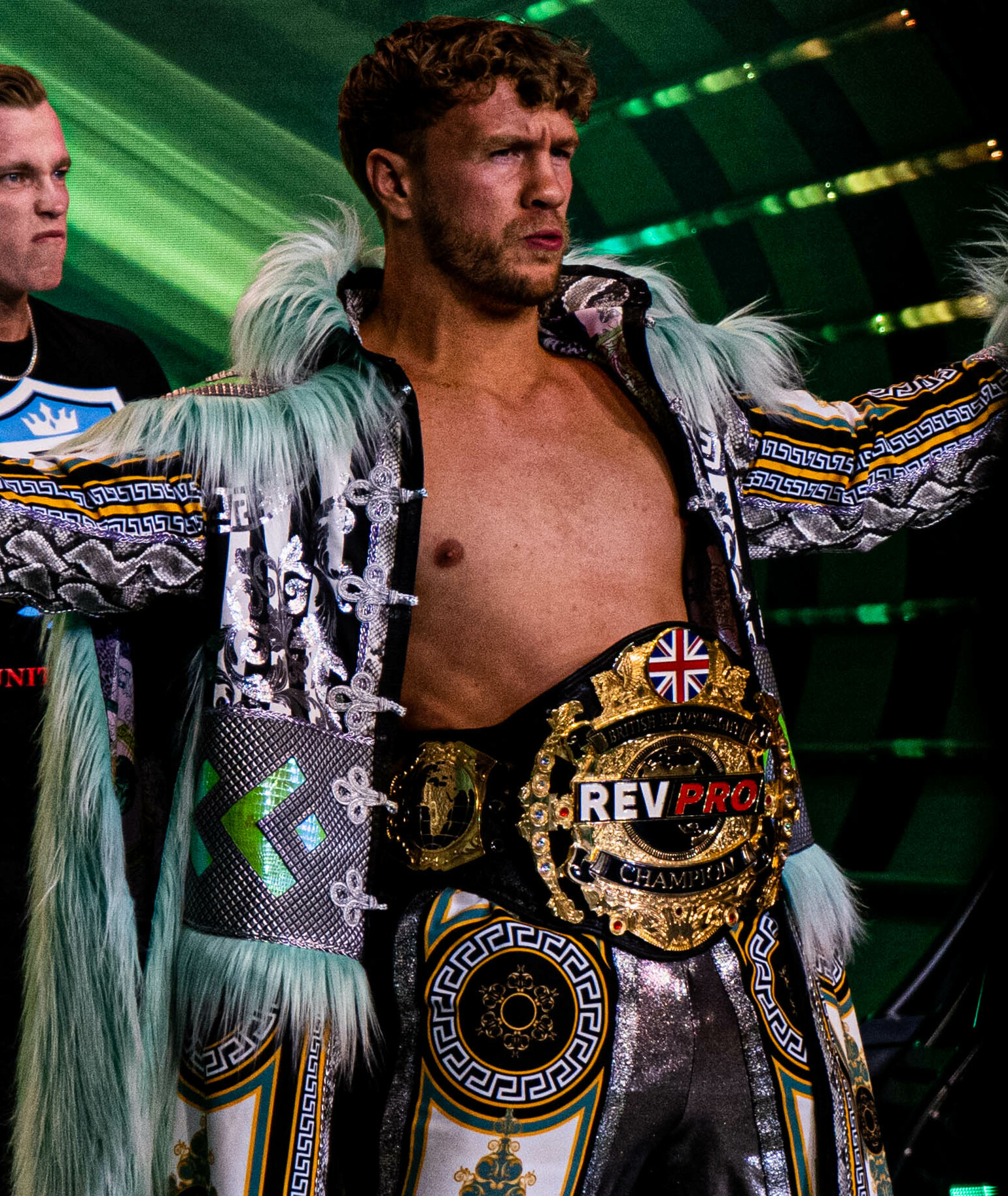
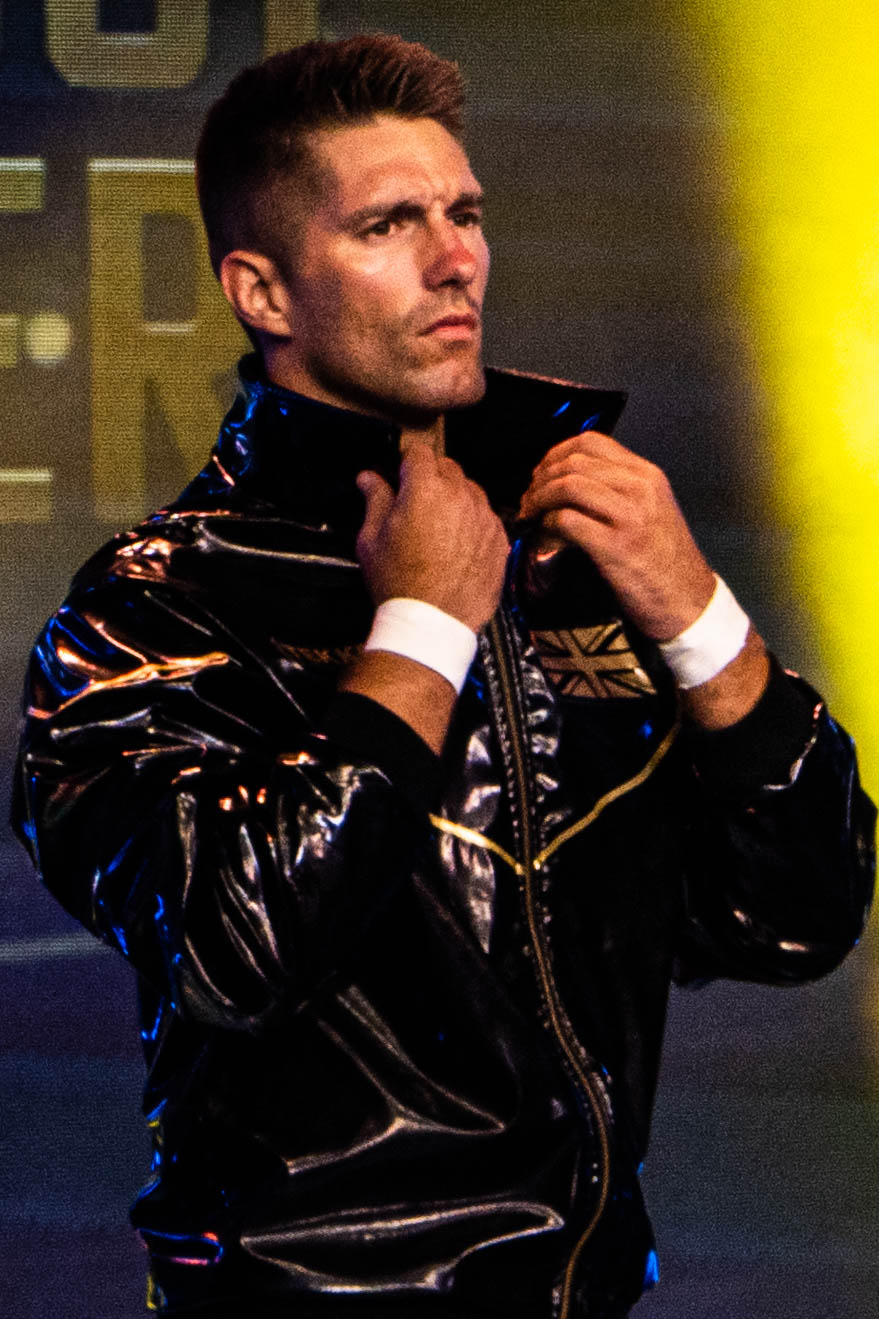
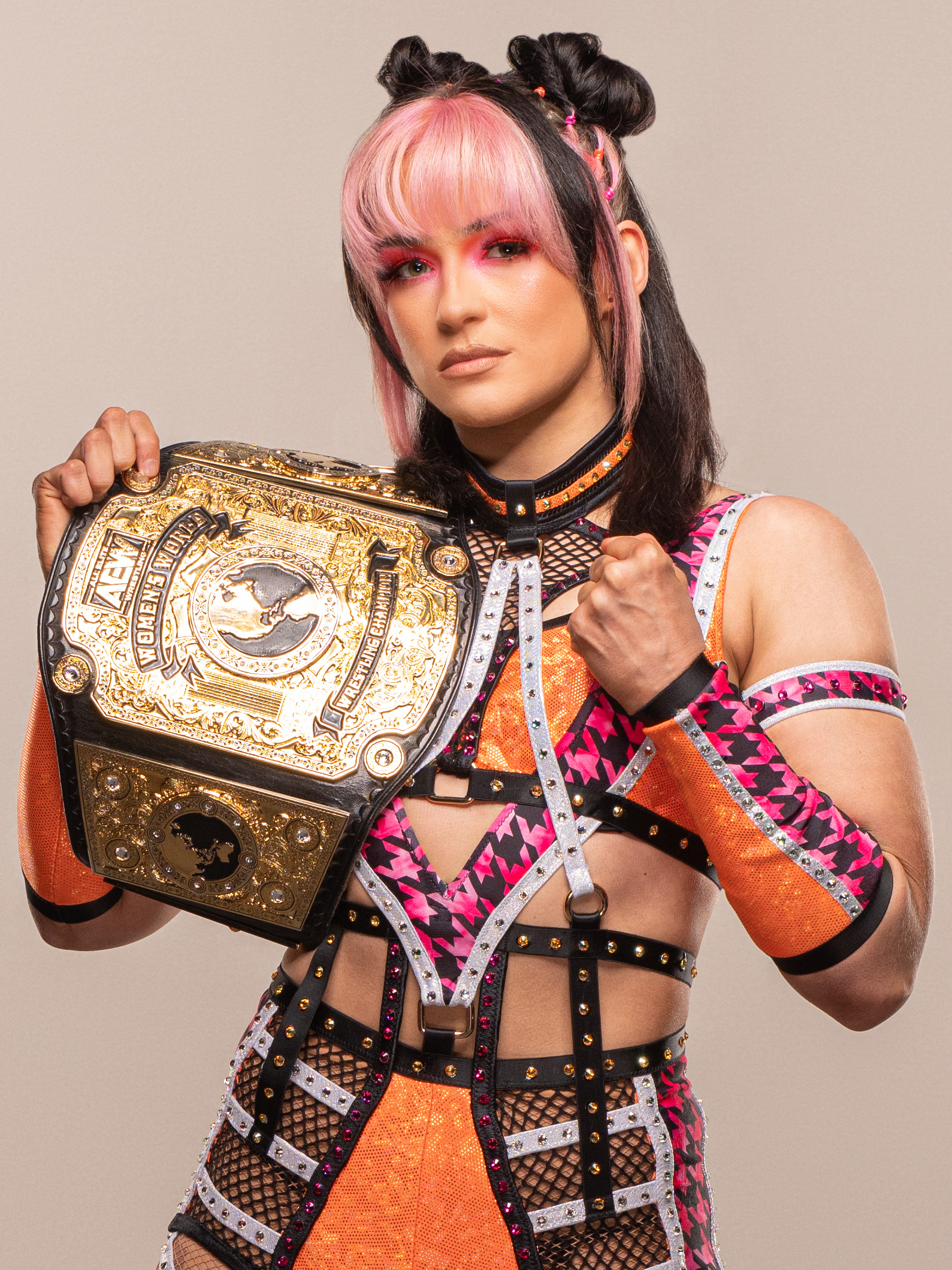
- Top: The 2010s saw many British professional wrestlers spending a prolonged period developing their skills in the UK before departing for the US, such as Pete Dunne, Saraya, and PAC.
- Bottom: While wrestlers such as Will Ospreay, Zack Sabre Jr, and Jamie Hayter advanced their careers using newly-built connections between the UK and Japan.

This boom period of independent wrestling saw an increasing drive to return British Wrestling to ITV. A pilot for World of Sport Wrestling (branding itself as a direct revival of the old slot on the World Of Sport programme) was filmed at the Fairfield Halls, Croydon in 2013, however it was not picked up by ITV. Another attempt was given an airing by ITV on New Year's Eve 2016. A follow-up series of 10 episodes was due to be filmed at Preston Guild Hall in May 2017 but this was postponed until a year later. Around this time, WWE also took an active interest in the local UK wrestling circuit, organising a WWE United Kingdom Championship Tournament in Blackpool in January 2017, which crowned the inaugural WWE United Kingdom Champion. Several professional wrestling journalists reported that the WWE's renewed interest in the region was to prevent the World of Sport Wrestling programme from succeeding.

The World Of Sport Wrestling TV revival resumed production in May 2018 at Epic Studios Norwich and was broadcast on ITV between 28 July and 29 September 2018. In July 2018 WWE announced that they would be launching NXT UK, a new development promotion to be based directly in the UK. Ultimately, the attempted revival would flounder and in 2019 a frustrated ITV moved on from the project, opting instead to begin airing programming from the newly created American promotion All Elite Wrestling. On 1 September 2022 the final episode of NXT UK aired, with WWE folding the entire NXT UK project.

=== 2020s: Multiple American PPVs in the UK ===
As the American professional wrestling market became more competitive following the creation of All Elite Wrestling in 2019, independent British wrestling promotions such as Progress Wrestling and Revolution Pro Wrestling were able to utilise their talent through partnerships, while American companies took a renewed interest in directly securing the British market. In 2020, at WrestleMania 36, Scotland's Drew McIntyre became the first British wrestler to win the WWE Championship and in 2022, McIntyre headlined WWE Clash at the Castle, which took place in front of 62,296 paid attendees in Cardiff, Wales. The next year saw All Elite Wrestling hold All In 2023 (Note: The name "All In" was coincidental and was not a reference to the "All-In" British wrestling style of the 1930s) in Wembley Stadium, London, England before 72,265 paid attendees. WWE would hold the 2023 Money in the Bank event at The O_{2} Arena earlier that year. In 2024, WWE held the 2024 Clash at the Castle in Glasgow, Scotland, whilst AEW returned to Wembley Stadium with All In 2024. Excluding SummerSlam 1992, these were the largest professional wrestling events to ever be held in the UK. In 2025, AEW and NJPW held Forbidden Door at The O2 Arena. The following year, AEW held All In 2026 at Wembley Stadium.

Max Crabtree died on 2 April 2023. Brian Dixon died 27 May 2023, bequeathing All Star Wrestling to his grandson Joseph Dixon.

== Nations of the United Kingdom ==
=== Wales ===
Wales had a strong foothold in British Wrestling, dominated by Orig Williams from the mid/late 1960s onward up to the 21st century. Williams' British Wrestling Federation produced Welsh-language television wrestling programmes for the bilingual S4C channel in the 1980s and 1990s under the title Reslo. One compilation from the early 1990s was released on VHS (in English) as Wrestling Madness. As with old ITV footage on the Wrestling Channel and elsewhere, copious old Reslo footage has also been repeated on S4C Digidol and uploaded to YouTube. Since Williams' death in November 2009, he was succeeded by Alan Ravenhill, who operates 'Welsh Wrestling'. Other promotions in Wales include Attack! Pro Wrestling, Basix Pro Wrestling,, Britannia Pro Wrestling (BWP), Exist Pro Wrestling, Exposure Wrestling Entertainment, FUSION Pro Wrestling, New Wave Wrestling, No Mercy Wrestling, Pro Wrestling Karnage, Slammasters Wrestling, South Wales Pro Wrestling, VCW Pro Wrestling, as well as many other unnamed promotions.

=== Scotland ===
Scotland was represented as part of Joint Promotions by Relwyskow Promotions, run by the family of George de Relwyskow. Relwyskow Promotions was not included in the buyouts of Joint Promotions in the 1960s-1980s and remained under its original management while continuing to receive a proportion of Joint Promotions' TV coverage. It remained active until the retirement of Ann Relwyskow in 1994. In 1990 and again in 1993, television tapings were held in Scotland and matches screened on Grampian Television and STV. During the 1960s, World Lightweight champion George Kidd was a successful television broadcaster, hosting his own chat show in Scotland's ITV regions.

=== Northern Ireland ===
The dominant promoter in Northern Ireland in the 1960s/1970s was former Irish national Olympic coach David "Fit" Finlay Senior who promoted wrestling on both sides of the border and trained such stars as his son Dave Finlay, Eddie Hammill and Sean "Rasputin" Doyle. Due to The Troubles, in the 1970s and 1980s these wrestlers and others would migrate to Britain and find success there (in Hamill's case, under a mask, billed as Kung Fu.) The younger Finlay would become a multiple champion and later succeed in America.

== Republic of Ireland ==
Although RTÉ never had a wrestling show of its own, in the mid-1980s, a major championship match between Mighty John Quinn and Haystacks in Claremorris was publicised with a contract signing ceremony on Derek Davis' Davis at Large show.

Later in the 1980s and 1990s, transmissions of Williams' Reslo programme on S4C could be received in much of the southern and eastern Republic of Ireland and Williams organised several tours of Ireland with his show's roster during this time. In the 21st century, the dominant promotion in Ireland had been Irish Whip Wrestling before being replaced in popularity by Over The Top Wrestling.

== See also ==
- History of professional wrestling
- List of professional wrestling attendance records in the United Kingdom
- Professional wrestling promotions in the United Kingdom
- WWE in the United Kingdom

== Selected bibliography ==
- Lister, John. "The History of British Wrestling". Pro Wrestling Press #6, (May 2002)
- House of Deception Golden Age 1911–1979: bibliography, photos, Lister article.
- Curley, Mallory. Beatle Pete, Time Traveller (2005): information on Liverpool Stadium wrestling promoter Bill Best, uncle of original Beatles drummer Pete Best.
- "Catch – The Hold Not Taken", a documentary on the origins of catch-as-catch-can wrestling
