= Drew McDonald (wrestler) =

Scottish professional wrestler (1955–2015)

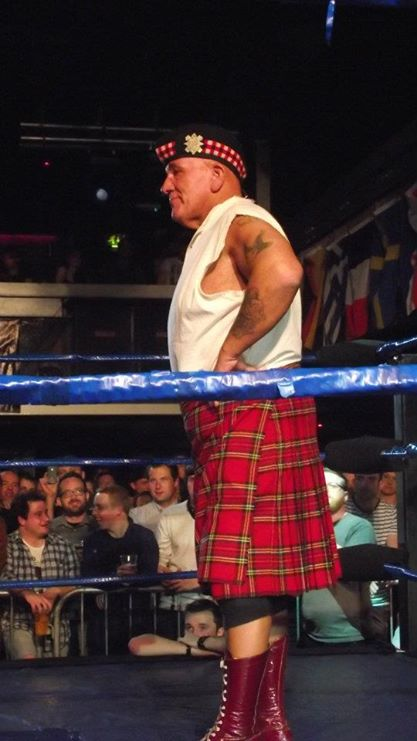
- McDonald at an Insane Championship Wrestling show in 2012

Personal information
- Born: Charles Shaw; 16 June 1955 Perth, Scotland, UK
- Died: 9 February 2015 (aged 59)

Professional wrestling career
- Ring name(s): Drew McDonald; Mad McDonald; Ben Doon McDonald; Comrade McDonald; The Spoiler; The Ultimate Chippendale
- Billed height: 6 ft 1 in (1.85 m)
- Billed weight: 22 st (310 lb; 140 kg)
- Billed from: Glasgow, Scotland
- Trained by: Ian Law
- Debut: 1980

Drew McDonald (born Charles Shaw, name changed via deed poll; 16 June 1955 – 9 February 2015) was a Scottish professional wrestler. He was best known for wrestling in the United Kingdom since the 1980s.

== Professional wrestling career ==
McDonald, born Charles Shaw, first got into wrestling when friend of his who ran a school in Perth for wayward children was promoting a wrestling show to make funds for the school. Ian Law who held a splinter claim to the British Middleweight Championship at the time (the main lineage being held by Brian "Goldbelt" Maxine) was helping his friend run the show. One of the wrestlers had been seriously injured two weeks out from the show and a friend asked McDonald if he would stand in for the injured man. McDonald had a two-week crash course before first pro match against Wild Angus, The match lasted 5 rounds with Angus beating McDonald by the final bell.

McDonald stayed in Scotland wrestling for another year after that first match, in April 1984 he went down to England to work for Joint Promotions, the biggest promoters at that time (in the United Kingdom). The next five years saw McDonald wrestle against the likes of Ray Steele and Gill Singh and become a frequent face on ITV's televised wrestling coverage. Outside of the ring, McDonald would also develop friendships with the likes of Danny Boy Collins, Fit Finlay and referee Jeff Kaye. McDonald at one point would join the army at the Guards Depot at Pirbright where he joined with the Scots Guards. During his time there he met Dave Taylor, later of WCW fame, who had enlisted in the same regiment as McDonald, as a bandsman on the same day.

A match screened as part of ITV's 1984 FA Cup Final coverage saw McDonald team with Big Daddy to defeat Giant Haystacks and Finlay. Three years later, he adopted the persona of the masked Spoiler, managed by the German Doctor Monika Kaiser, played by his lifelong partner, Monika Markwart. Teaming with King Kendo to face Daddy and Andy Blair, he was unmasked by Daddy but preserved his identity due to a black nylon stocking worn over his head and under the mask, concealing his identity so he could get away. A subsequent match pitting the Spoiler and Rasputin (Shawn Doyle) against Daddy and Jason "Kashmir" Singh saw the Spoiler again unmasked and this time identified clearly as McDonald. A rematch between the four with a "Hair vs Hair" stipulation ended in the defeated McDonald being shaved bald. He would retain this look for all his remaining matches on ITV.

McDonald also wrestled on French TV, making one appearance on TF1's New Catch in 1988 (rescreened on Eurosport in 1991) and in eight bouts between 1988 and 1995 on Orig Williams' Reslo Welsh language wrestling TV show for S4C. After the demise of ITV's wrestling coverage, he moved to All Star Wrestling. For some time, he continued to be managed by Kaiser in All Star. In the early 1990s, he adopted the image of "The Ultimate Chippendale", later forming a tag team of 'Chippendales' with Dale "The Model" Preston. Aside from wrestling for all the top promotions in the UK, McDonald traveled worldwide, wrestling for promotions like Canada's Stampede Wrestling under the name Ben Doon McDonald, and feuding with stars like Chris Benoit.

McDonald won many UK top titles including Scottish Championship Wrestling's Scottish Heavyweight Championship, and All Star Wrestling's British Heavyweight Championship. He won the British title when he defeated Robbie Brookside in Croydon on 7 July 2005. McDonald teamed up with many long time wrestlers, including Dave Finlay (in the Catch Wrestling Association), Ulf Herman, and Robbie Brookside. Later McDonald would team with rookie stars like Thunder (Darren Walsh, son of veteran heel Tony "Banger" Walsh), and Raj Gosh. During a time when both Thunder and Gosh wrestled in Frontier Wrestling Alliance at the same time as McDonald the group banded together under the stable name "The Triad".

In January 2006, Steve Sonic defeated McDonald in a ladder match for All Star Wrestling's British Heavyweight Championship. Throughout 2006 McDonald would continue to wrestle in All Star as well as with other British independent promotions. McDonald also ran his own wrestling school along with former wrestler and referee Jeff Kaye in Stanningley, Leeds. In 2008, he began working for Superstars of Wrestling.

In May 2011, McDonald challenged James Mason for the Union of European Wrestling Alliances European Heavyweight Championship for All Action Wrestling. In 2012, he appeared for Insane Championship Wrestling at Insane in the Membrane where he teamed with Grado and Wolfgang in a losing effort against Damian O'Connor, Jamie Feerick and Scott Maverick.

His last match took place at GL1 Gloucester Leisure Centre in 2013

Drew worked for an independent crowd management company called The SES Group – Show and Event as a security manager

== Death ==
McDonald died at the age of 59 on 9 February 2015 from cancer. He is survived by his partner Monika Markwart aka his manager Doctor Monika Kaiser. WWE Wrestler Paige paid tribute to him on that night's episode of Monday Night Raw with the words "RIP Drew McDonald" written on her arms.

== Championships and accomplishments ==
- Frontier Wrestling Alliance
  - FWA Tag Team Championship (1 time) – with Ulf Herman

== Luchas de Apuestas record ==
Winner (wager)	Loser (wager)	Location	Event	Date	Notes
Big Daddy (hair) and Kashmir Singh (no wager)	Drew McDonald (hair) & Rasputin (no wager)	Burnley, Lancs	Taping for ITV	January 24, 1988	
