= Danny Boy (disambiguation) =

"Danny Boy" is a song often associated with Irish people and culture.

Danny Boy may also refer to:

== People ==
- Danny Boy Collins (born 1967), English professional wrestler
- Danny Boy (rapper) (born 1968), rap/hip hop artist
- Danny Boy (singer) (born 1977), R&B/soul singer
- Danny-Boy Hatchard (born 1991), UK actor

== Music ==
- Danny Boy et ses Pénitents, a French rock and roll group of the 1960s
- Danny Boy: The Life & Times of a Kid in the D (album) 2014 rap album by Hush
- "Danny Boy", a song by Rufus Wainwright from the album Rufus Wainwright

== Film ==
- Danny Boy (1934 film), a British musical film
- Danny Boy (1941 film), a British drama film
- Danny Boy (1946 film), an American film
- Danny Boy (2020 film), a British made-for-television film about the Battle of Danny Boy
- Danny Boy, a 2010 animated short directed and written by Marek Skrobecki

== Other uses ==
- Battle of Danny Boy, a battle in Iraq 2004 involving Princess of Wales's Royal Regiment

== See also ==
- A boy named Danny
- Broadsword calling Danny Boy (disambiguation)
- Danny Boy plus three (album) 1996 record
- DannyBoyStyles, Grammy award-winning record producer
- Danny Bhoy (born 1975) Scottish comedian
- Danny Boyd (born 1958) U.S. American football player
- Daniel Boyle (disambiguation)
- Daniel Boyd (disambiguation)
