= British Heavy Middleweight Championship =

Professional wrestling championship

Details
- Promotion: Joint Promotions / All Star Wrestling
- Date established: 1953
- Date retired: circa 1996
Statistics
- First champion: Eric Taylor
- Final champion: Danny Boy Collins
- Most reigns: Dave Finlay (6 reigns)

The British Heavy Middleweight Championship was a top British wrestling championship found throughout the country's circuit. The title's history dates back to its foundation by Joint Promotions in 1953. Officially heavy middleweights were required to weight between 12 st 8 lb (176 lbs) and 13 st 5 lb (187 lb).

The championship was recognised and defended on matches screened by UK national television network ITV as part of the professional wrestling slot on World of Sport as well as standalone broadcasts. Pre-publicity for these championship match broadcasts was given in ITV's nationally published listings magazine TVTimes The entire 31 October 1987 edition of the standalone Wrestling broadcast was given over to Fit Finlay's recapture of the title from Chic Cullen in Bradford, 17 September 1987 and highlights of this match were included on the official ITV wrestling compilation VHS release Mayhem and Mystery. Similarly, highlights of Alan Kilby's capture of the vacant title in a tournament final over King Ben in Preston, 7 October 1981, were included on official ITV wrestling compilation DVD release The Best Of British Wrestling A-Z.

== Title history ==
The title was founded in 1953 and remained in Joint Promotions until the mid-1980s when it was taken over by All Star Wrestling. The title remained active until the mid-1990s.

Key
No.	Overall reign number
Reign	Reign number for the specific champion
Days	Number of days held

No.	Champion	Championship change			Reign statistics		Notes	Ref.
No.	Champion	Date	Event	Location	Reign	Days	Notes	Ref.
	Eric Taylor	1953	House show	N/A	1	N/A	Vacated the title in 1966 when he left Joint Promotions.	
	Bert Royal	4 May 1966 (NLT)	House show	N/A	1	N/A		
	Bert Royal	16 January 1968	House show	Blackburn	2	N/A	Defeated Peter Preston, having lost the title at some point before this date.	
	Jackie Pallo	21 April 1969	House show	Nottingham	1	N/A		
	Bert Royal	May 1969 (NLT)	House show	N/A	3	N/A		
	Steve Logan	29 August 1975	House show	Liverpool	1	N/A		
	Bert Royal	11 November 1975	House show	Manchester	4	N/A		
	Mark Rocco	11 June 1977	House show	Manchester	1	N/A		
	Marty Jones	13 September 1978	House show	Woking	1	N/A	Jones, already the holder of the British Light Heavyweight Championship, vacated the title immediately.	
	Mark Rocco	6 December 1978	House show	Blackburn	2	N/A	Won a tournament final against Chris Adams. Vacated title in August 1981 after winning the world title	
	Alan Kilby	7 October 1981	House show	Preston	1	N/A	Won a tournament for the belt, defeating King Ben in the final	
	Dave Finlay	9 June 1982	House show	Bath, Somerset	1	N/A		
	Alan Kilby	August 1982 (NLT)	House show	N/A	2	N/A		
	Dave Finlay	14 September 1982	House show	Croydon	2	N/A		
	Alan Kilby	10 November 1982	House show	London	3	N/A		
	Dave Finlay	15 November 1982	House show	Bradford	3	N/A		
	Alan Kilby	November 1982	House show	N/A	4	N/A location=		
	Dave Finlay	21 December 1982	House show	Wolverhampton	4	N/A		
	Alan Kilby	January 1983	House show	N/A	5	N/A		
	Chic Cullen	21 March 1983	House show	London	1	N/A		
	Dave Finlay	29 September 1984 (NLT)	House show	N/A	6	N/A	Legacy from Cullen uncertain	
	Chic Cullen	1985 (NLT)	House show	N/A	2	N/A	Legacy from Finlay uncertain	
	Rocky Moran	7 January 1986	House show	Croydon	1	N/A		
	Kung Fu (Ed Hamill)	3 March 1986	House show	Bradford	1	N/A		
	Chic Cullen	May 1987 (NLT)	House show	N/A	3	N/A		
	Dave Finlay	17 September 1987	House show	Bradford	6	N/A		
	Danny Boy Collins	4 July 1989	House show	Croydon	1	N/A		
	Richie Brooks	29 May 1990	House show	Croydon	1	N/A	Wins title by disqualification when Collins, dazed from falling head-first to ringside, attacks the referee.	
	Danny Boy Collins	4 September 1990	House show	Croydon	2	N/A	Last known title claimant. Won the British Light Heavyweight Championship in 1996	

== See also ==
- Professional wrestling in the United Kingdom
