= Daniel Boyd =

Daniel Boyd may refer to:

- Daniel Montgomery Boyd (1826–1899), Pennsylvanian industrialist
- Daniel Patrick Boyd (born 1970), American accused of leading a jihadist terrorist cell
- Daniel Boyd (artist) (born 1982), Australian artist
- Daniel Boyd (filmmaker) (1956–2026), American filmmaker, author, and communications professor
- Danny Boyd (born 1978), former professional football placekicker and current school music instructor

== See also ==
- Danny Bhoy (born 1975) Scottish comedian
- Danny Boy (disambiguation)
