= Kendo Nagasaki =

Kendo Nagasaki is a professional wrestling ring name that has been used by two different individuals. The character is portrayed as a Japanese Samurai warrior with a mysterious past and supernatural powers of hypnosis. The name derives from the modern martial art of Japanese fencing (Kendo), and the site of the second use of the atomic bomb (Nagasaki).

Although the masked British version portrayed by Peter Thornley remains a household name in his home country, most American and Japanese wrestling fans primarily associate the name "Kendo Nagasaki" and related imagery with the face-painted version portrayed by Kazuo Sakurada. The success of both Thornley and Sakurada has spawned an assortment of other wrestlers with characters inspired by, or simply impersonating, the gimmick.

== Peter Thornley ==
The original use of the gimmick is by the British wrestler who made his name in ITV's World of Sport. He started professional wrestling in November 1964, and became a household name in Britain after his television debut in 1971. He also toured Japan in 1968 (under the alternative ring name Mr Guillotine) and North America in 1972, wrestling for Stu Hart's Stampede Wrestling where he held the promotion's North American title, as well as Don Owen's Pacific Northwest Wrestling and was being recruited by Verne Gagne's AWA before having to return home due to a family bereavement. Back home in Britain, he achieved greater fame because of 1975–1977 feud with the tag team of future mutual arch enemies Big Daddy and Giant Haystacks, as well as his televised voluntary unmasking ceremony in December 1977.

After retiring in 1978, he briefly came back in 1981 before returning more permanently in 1986 as lead heel of All Star Wrestling during their brief two years of ITV coverage. This triggered a second period of major success continuing even after the end of wrestling on ITV until Nagasaki retired again in 1993. Since that time, he has made further comebacks with All Star Wrestling in 2000-2001 and 2022, New Generation Wrestling in 2012 and LDN Wrestling in 2008 and 2024-present.

== Kazuo Sakurada ==
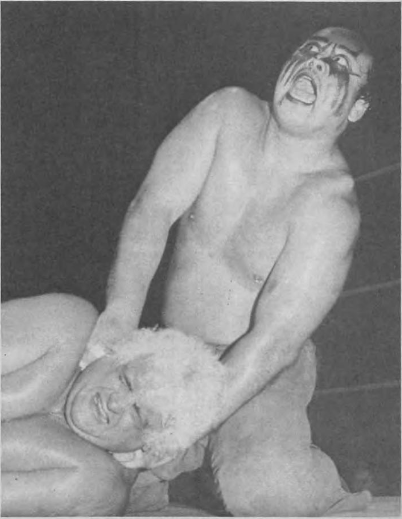
Kazuo Sakurada as Nagasaki during a 1982 match against Dusty Rhodes

A Japanese wrestler named Kazuo Sakurada also used a variation of the gimmick in the United States during the early 1980s. Before adopting the gimmick, Sakurada, like Thornley, had wrestled for Stampede and held the North American title there. This version of Nagasaki would wrestle in the American Wrestling Association, Florida Championship Wrestling (where he was managed by J. J. Dillon), World Wrestling Council in Puerto Rico and Continental Wrestling Federation and in Japan for New Japan Pro-Wrestling, where he formed the "Ninja Express" team alongside Mr. Pogo, before going on to wrestle on WCW television, changing his ring name to The Dragonmaster and joining the J-Tex Corporation stable.

Like Thornley, Sakurada wore a Kendo helmet to the ring. Unlike the British original, Sakurada wore face paint instead of a mask and carried a kendo stick rather than a sword. Sakurada also used Asian mist as part of his repertoire. Sakurada died in Chiba, Japan on 12 January 2020.

== Related characters ==
=== Kendo Nagasaki II ===
A year after Thornley's original retirement in 1978, a lighter wrestler named Kendo Nagasaki II (played by Nick Heywood) briefly wrestled for Joint Promotions.

=== King Kendo (Bill Clarke) ===
Also in the late 1970s, wrestler "Big" Bill Clarke (also one half of the Lincolnshire Poachers tag team with "brother" Ron) appeared on shows by UK independent promoter Sandor Kovaks as a version of Kendo Nagasaki modelled directly on Thornley's character. Following considerable legal action by Thornley, Clarke was later renamed as King Kendo, but retained the Kendo helmet, sword, cape and striped mask. In this guise, Clarke would later wrestle Thornley in a series of loser-lose-mask battles of the Kendos for Wrestling Enterprises of Birkenhead circa 1981 with Clarke unmasked, usually by Thornley personally, night after night.

Still as King Kendo, Clarke would later join Joint Promotions as a journeyman heel, teaming with Giant Haystacks in the main event at the Royal Albert Hall, making several appearances on television and frequently wrestling in tag matches against Big Daddy, including teaming with King Kong Kirk on the night Kirk died in the ring in 1987. Clarke and Thornley were scheduled to have a fresh feud in All Star Wrestling in 1993 with the authentic Nagasaki's manager Lloyd Ryan defecting to King Kendo's side, but this was abandoned when Thornley retired for the second time, with Clarke also retiring soon after. Clarke died on 10 October 2018.

=== King Kendo (Dale Preston) ===
Following Clarke's retirement, another wrestler Dale Preston (real name Dale Broughton) took over the role of King Kendo, wearing Clarke's original costume and still managed by Ryan. During the mid-1990s, this version of King Kendo was frequently in the main event of All Star shows pitted in reenactments of successful feuds in which Thornley's Kendo had been involved, such as against Giant Haystacks.

Since 2012, Preston has revived the character for the Norwich-based World Association of Wrestling (WAW) in which he was for some time a major heel. Preston as King Kendo also won the RQW Tag Team Championship as half of the tag team 4K with Karl Kramer in December 2013. By the late 2010s, Preston's Kendo had evolved into a blue eye character due to his mentoring of young protegé "Kid Kendo". King Kendo also held the WAW World Heavyweight championship before curiously losing it to his own alter ego Dale Broughton in 2018 (possibly with a substitute under the mask).

=== Kendo the Samurai ===
In the early 1990s, Jim Cornette's Smokey Mountain Wrestling featured a masked samurai character named Kendo the Samurai managed by Daryl Van Horne. This was initially portrayed by Tim Horner but was later played by other wrestlers including Scott Antol and Brian Logan.

=== Kendo Kashin ===
In 1996, Japanese wrestler Tokimitsu Ishizawa became the masked Kendo Kashin while wrestling for the CWA in Germany and Austria. He would later take the gimmick back home to Japan where he has achieved considerable success, including various championships, as the character.

=== Kendo Nakazaki ===
In 2008, the original Tiger Mask, Satoru Sayama, introduced to his Real Japan Pro Wrestling promotion a wrestler named Kendo Nakazaki. Nakazaki's real name is unknown; he wears a mask and a Union Jack flag on his chest, but is most likely a Japanese student of Sayama's.
