= Peter Thornley =

English wrestler (born 1941)

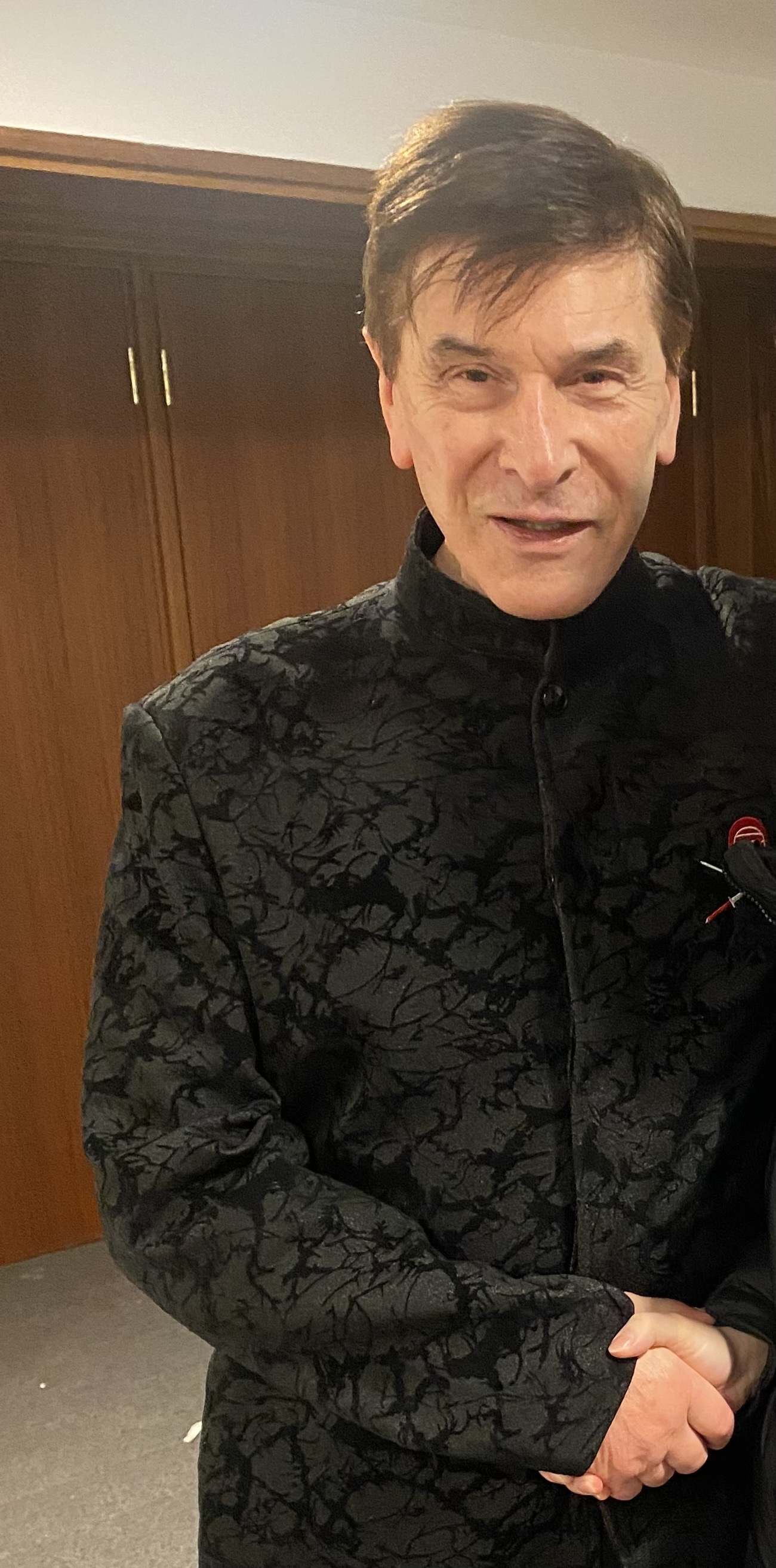
- Peter Thornley in November 2024

Personal information
- Born: Brian Stevens (renamed Peter William Thornley upon adoption); 19 October 1941 (age 84) Wellington, Shropshire, England
- Website: Official website

Professional wrestling career
- Ring name(s): Kendo Nagasaki; Mr Guillotine; Paul Dillon
- Billed height: 6 ft 2 in (1.88 m)
- Billed weight: 15 st (95 kg) - 18 st (110 kg)
- Trained by: Geoff Condliffe (professional wrestling)
- Debut: November 1964

Peter William Thornley (born 19 October 1941) is an English professional wrestler who is best known for the ring character Kendo Nagasaki. The character of Nagasaki was a Japanese samurai with a mysterious past and reputed powers of healing and hypnosis. He was one of the biggest draws of all time in British wrestling, especially in the mid-1970s and the turn of the 1980s to 1990s.

Thornley wore a mask for most of his career, the one significant exception being several months following a December 1977 televised voluntary unmasking ceremony. He had originally retired in 1978 but returned to competition briefly in 1981 and then again from 1986 to 1993. Thereafter, he made sporadic wrestling appearances.

Thornley gave occasional interviews as Kendo Nagasaki, usually photographed fully masked or with his face hidden, and often speaking through a representative. The character's voice was never heard in public. His identity as the man behind Kendo Nagasaki was first revealed publicly by a plumber who visited his house in the 1970s. His identity became more widely known after a 2002 court case over a land dispute with his neighbour. Thornley never spoke publicly about being Kendo Nagasaki until the publication of his autobiography in 2018.

Away from the ring, Thornley has been a successful business entrepreneur and also had a career in rock management for around a decade from the late 1970s to the late 1980s, managing Cuddly Toys and Laura Pallas and running his own recording studio.

== Relationship with character of Kendo Nagasaki ==
Until the publication of his autobiography in 2018, Thornley and his close associates frowned on the use of his legal name, preferring that his out-of-character self be referred to as "Yogensha" (Japanese for seer). According to his official website, the Nagasaki character is "in fact, a spirit guide and sensei ... who appears by being channelled through an otherwise ordinary man" i.e., Thornley/Yogensha

At the height of his career, Thornley discussed the relationship with his character in an interview for TVTimes in 1976 in which he asserted that the Nagasaki character was "the spirit of a samurai warrior who, 300 years ago, lived in the place that is now called Nagasaki" which he had contacted while in "a trance state" during meditation.

== Professional wrestling career ==
=== Early career (1964–1971) ===
In November 1964 Thornley had his first professional contest against "Jumping" Jim Hussey at Willenhall Baths. Nagasaki's most notable achievement during the 1960s was in March 1966 when he defeated and unmasked Count Bartelli (Geoff Condliffe) at the Victoria Hall in Hanley, Stoke-on-Trent.

Bartelli had been Nagasaki's mentor and tag team partner until they had a storyline falling out over Nagasaki's rough tactics in the ring. During the late 1960s, Nagasaki would feud with Billy Robinson and also with a young Jean Ferre. In 1968, Thornley toured Japan, where he was billed under the alternative name Mr Guillotine (but still with the same visual image).

=== World of Sport (1971–1986) ===
Kendo Nagasaki made his ITV debut in May 1971 on the FA Cup Final special edition of World of Sport with a victory over Wayne Bridges. During July 1971, in what was said to be a sensational TV contest with Billy Howes, his mask came off in the heat of the battle. Howes spent a great deal of effort pounding Nagasaki's head and dragging his tight-fitting mask up, almost covering Nagasaki's eyes, and tried to untie the straps holding it on, before, under his relentless efforts, it came loose. Howes showed little sign of actually wrestling in the end stages and was solely intent on removing the mask, which he finally did, and Nagasaki quickly left the ring, covering his face.

In December 1971, he appeared for the first time with manager "Gorgeous" George Gillette at Dumfries. He then went on to tour Canada and the United States during 1972 working for wrestling legend Stu Hart. Nagasaki was renowned for his strength; in one televised match he lifted the 26 stone 9 pounds (169 kg) "The Battling Guardsman" Shirley Crabtree later known as 'Big Daddy', up on to his shoulders, then calmly walked to a corner carrying him and finished the bout with his famous Kamikaze Crash, leaving the ring as Crabtree was being counted out.

In December 1975, again facing Big Daddy (as he was by then only named) on television, Nagasaki was successfully unmasked (although he nonetheless went on to win the bout), starting a violent feud between the two. The unmasking occurred two years before he had an official ceremonial unmasking ceremony at the Civic Hall, Wolverhampton in what was one of the most anticipated and most viewed moments in ITV's World of Sport. In April the following year (1978), he appeared as an unmasked wrestler for the first time; in a contest at Croydon against Bronco Wells. Following an August 1978 Nagasaki win on television over Colin Joynson, British Heavyweight champion Tony St. Clair entered the ring and announced he was accepting a title challenge from the now unmasked and therefore eligible Nagasaki. However, before the match could take place, in September 1978 he retired on doctor's orders from the ring and began a new career in rock management.

Nagasaki returned in 1981-1982 in a few appearances for Brian Dixon, in which the real Nagasaki feuded with notorious Nagasaki impersonator King Kendo (Bill Clarke) in a series of loser-lose-mask matches which saw Clarke defeated and unmasked night after night.

=== All Star Wrestling (1986–1993) ===
In December 1986, Thornley made his masked return to the ring at the London Hippodrome in a "Disco Challenge" ladder match with Clive Myers, transmitted on ITV shortly after the New Year as the main event of the first ever edition of ITV wrestling taped at an All Star Wrestling show. It is thought Nagasaki brought over the concept over from Stampede Wrestling, where he had previously worked.

By September 1987 he went on to become the WWA World Heavyweight Champion after defeating Wayne Bridges. He also formed a tag team with Mark 'Rollerball' Rocco but this fell apart after a televised match in early 1988 resulting in a lengthy and violent feud between the two which would rage on at live shows during the first few years after the end of British Wrestling on TV.

Another tag team with Blondie Barrett would run for several years. During his final ITV appearance, Nagasaki and Barrett defeated the 'Golden Boys' tag team of Robbie Brookside and Steve Regal when the masked man hypnotised (kayfabe) Brookside to attack Regal. This, too, would lead to a long-running storyline with Nagasaki regularly using his 'powers' to turn Brookside over to his side at live shows.

In January 1989, George Gillette died of AIDS, and Lloyd Ryan officially became Kendo's new manager. In October 1991, he feuded with Giant Haystacks, and at one point was "robbed" of a World title (said to be the CWA World Heavyweight Championship, actually held at the time by Rambo) after Haystacks deliberately pulled off his mask "forcing" him to abandon the match. Footage from this match was featured in the BBC2 documentary on Nagasaki Arena: Masters of the Canvas.

In 1993, Nagasaki and Ryan fell out (kayfabe) and were set to feud, with Nagasaki now managed by his personal assistant Lawrence Stevens and Ryan recruiting King Kendo for a fresh battle of the Kendos. This storyline was soon aborted when Nagasaki retired once more to concentrate on his role in commerce. Over the next few years, Ryan continued to manage King Kendo (with Dale Preston taking over the role from Clarke, who had also retired in 1993) in feuds with various old enemies of the real Nagasaki.

=== Millennium comeback (2000–2001) ===
He returned in May 2000 to accept the Wrestler of the Millennium trophy in a ceremony at Hanley's Victoria Hall. This began a "Millennium Comeback" campaign for Nagasaki, as a month later, he returned to the venue, teamed with Vic Powers, to face Darren Walsh and Marty Jones, who had objected (kayfabe) to Nagasaki winning the award. Over the next eighteen months he would appear on various All Star shows, sometimes teamed with Drew McDonald. In March 2001 he again partnered Vic Powers in a charity tag ladder match against James Mason and Walsh. This run ended in December 2001 with a formal retirement match, a Four Corners bout, again at the Victoria Hall, in which he faced and defeated Mason, Doug Williams and Dean Allmark.

=== LDN (2007–2008, 2024–2025) ===
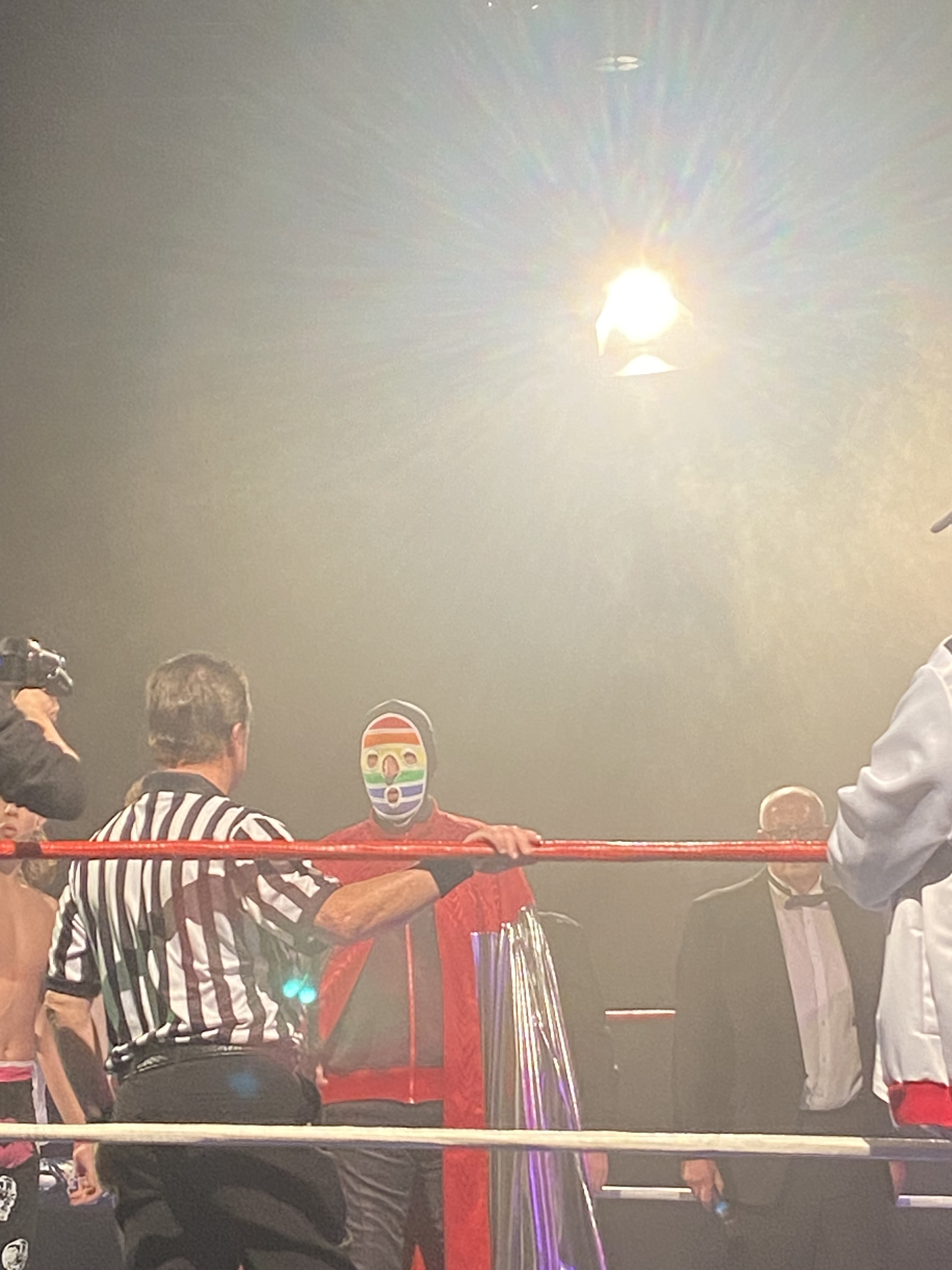
Kendo Nagasaki making his final in-ring appearance, November 2024

Since then, he was said to be looking for a young wrestler to pass his "powers" on to. In June 2007, he signed a deal with London-based LDN Wrestling. In November 2007, he appeared at LDN "Legends Showdown" in Broxbourne. He represented a team in a match against a team represented by his former manager, Lloyd Ryan, who had again (kayfabe) fallen out with his charge, this time over Ryan's son, young wrestler Damian Ryan. This event kicked off a storyline that saw him return to wrestling. Working exclusively for LDN Wrestling, he feuded with Robbie Brookside over The Sword of Excellence.

In May 2008, his old tag team partner, Blondie Barratt, teamed with him, along with a handpicked LDN Wrestler named Gregory Cortez, in a Triple Tag Team match to take on Powers, Brookside, and Hakan, who replaced Yorghos, whom he refused to wrestle. He then began feuding with Yorghos. Barratt wrestled against Yorghos and Hakan in a Ladder match in Hanley in September 2008. Then in October he was scheduled to wrestle Yorghos in a singles match in Wolverhampton, but refused to face him again, instead teaming with Blondie Barratt to defeat Hakan and Travis to win the LDN British Tag Team Championship. Following this match, Nagasaki left LDN and the Sword of Excellence storyline was concluded without him.

On July 22, 2012, Thornley reprised the character in a special appearance for New Generation Wrestling at the Bonus Arena in Kingston upon Hull. However, he did not wrestle again until November 2024 in Croydon when, aged 83 he teamed with the tag team Dead Gorgeous to defeat LDN promoter Sanjay Bagga and the tag team Filthy in a six man tag match. This was following a (kayfabe) war of words on social media and at shows regarding the Sword of Excellence, which had remained in Bagga's possession since the above 2007 storyline. Controversially, Nagasaki's team was disqualified by the referee. Kendo appealed directly to the full-house audience, who overwhelmingly sided with him and his team. The decision was reversed, in Nagasaki's favour, and he thus regained the Sword of Excellence. After the match, to quash any rumours that another wrestler had stood in for 83-year-old Peter Thornley, after removing his mask, he invited 3 members of the audience into the ring to verify that it was the real Kendo Nagasaki who had wrestled, by allowing them to examine the characteristic tattoo on his head, which they did and duly confirmed that it was indeed Thornley. This match was documented for an application to Guinness World Records for the oldest male professional wrestler ever to take part in a match. His participation fell behind the record held by Dory Funk Jr., who had held his last match months earlier at 83 years and 203 days old, but on 10 December 2025, Guinness World Records formally accepted Thornley's application and awarded the record to him.

On 23 November 2025, Thornley set a new record for the world's oldest professional wrestler (at 84 years, one month, and four days) by participating in LDN's event in Croydon under the title "The Final End of the Feud," pitting the team of Nagasaki, Ben Nelson and Jordan Nelson against Sage Valentine, Stevie Fee and Sanjay Bagga in an elimination trios match. Nagasaki scored the deciding pinfall after influencing Fee to his side with his mask. The record was broken by Baron von Raschke in October 2026. Raschke performed at the age of 85.

=== Post-retirement appearances ===
Nagasaki appeared with Lyn Rigby (see below) at several of All-Star's wrestling events in 2018 to promote his autobiography. At these shows, he performed a reenactment of the 1977 unmasking ceremony with Rigby in Gillette's role. Following each unmasking, Nagasaki would revert to being Thornley for the rest of the evening.

On 16 October 2022, Nagasaki, fully masked and in character, attended an All Star show at the Floral Pavilion Theatre, New Brighton and was a ringside judge at Oliver Grey's defence of his All Star British Heavyweight Championship (which Nagasaki himself had held in 1988) against former champion NIWA. During the match, NIWA attempted to grab the title belt to use as a weapon, but Nagasaki used his "powers" to make NIWA keep his hands off the belt. Grey went on to pin NIWA to defend the title successfully and was presented with the belt by Nagasaki.

=== Other media work ===
The artist Peter Blake was once asked by a magazine what he would have liked to have been had he not been an artist, and he answered a wrestler, and more specifically, Kendo Nagasaki. Thornley, in turn, expressed a wish to have been Richard Branson. Thornley agreed to sit for a Blake portrait for the BBC Arena programme, Masters of the Canvas in January 1992.

In December 2012, Kendo Nagasaki appeared in the BBC documentary "Timeshift — When Wrestling Was Golden: Grapples, Grunts and Grannies". He remained silent, and the programme also featured clips of him wrestling and the famous "unmasking" ceremony in Wolverhampton, 1977. The programme was repeated on BBC Four on 15 July 2013 and 10 June 2015.

== Championships and accomplishments ==
- Judo
  - British Judo Council Northwest area heavyweight champion and National Champion 1961/62 and finalist Northwest area 1962/63
- British wrestling
  - All Star Wrestling British Heavyweight Champion (1 time)
  - LDN British Tag Team Championship (1 time) – with Blondie Barratt
  - WWA World Heavyweight Championship (UK version) (1 time)
  - Wrestler of the Millennium trophy winner (2000)
- Stampede Wrestling
  - Stampede North American Heavyweight Championship (1 time)

== Personal life ==
Thornley's autobiography Kendo Nagasaki and the Man Behind the Mask was published in 2018, in which he discussed for the first time publicly about being the person behind the Kendo Nagasaki persona. His identity had previously been publicly revealed during a 2002 court case over a land dispute with his neighbour.

In his autobiography, Thornley says that he is bisexual, and he has spoken in related interviews about the issues faced by gay and bisexual sportsmen of his era. Thornley also married a woman, Yvette, who died in the 1990s. In his autobiography, he says he is now in a new relationship with a man, his longtime personal assistant Lawrence Stevens.

Thornley is a believer in Zen Buddhism and established his own Buddhist retreat at his private estate, Moor Court, near Cheadle, Staffordshire, which later gained charitable status as 'The Kendo Nagasaki Foundation'. In 2016 his charity and another, the Lee Rigby Foundation, decided to work together to support forces' veterans and their families coping with bereavement, PTSD, and other military-related stresses. Thornley dedicated one of the properties on the Moor Court estate as the 'Lee Rigby House', a retreat where forces' veterans and their families could stay for periods of respite. The house was named in honour of Lee Rigby, who was murdered by Jihadists in 2013, with Lee's mother Lyn helping to run the retreat. However, Thornley later faced legal issues which threatened the forced sale of the House, as a result of which he asked Lyn Rigby (whom Thornley had allowed to reside for free in other properties on the estate) to either buy or to rent the House. Unable to afford either option, Rigby and her charity moved off the estate.

In his youth, Thornley lost the index finger on his left hand. Although Simon Garfield's "The Wrestling" quotes promoter Max Crabtree's story that it was lost after an industrial accident at a Crewe horsebox manufacturer, Thornley has admitted it was the result of sepsis, contracted after being bitten by a member of a local gang.
