= Dan Doyle =

Dan Doyle or Danny Doyle may refer to:

== Sports ==
- Dan Doyle (footballer) (1864–1918), Scottish footballer
- Danny Doyle (baseball) (1917–2004), American baseball player
- Danny Doyle (basketball) (born 1940), former American professional basketball player
- Dan Doyle (basketball) (fl. 1970s–2010s), Executive Director of the Institute for International Sport

== Other ==
- Danny Doyle (singer) (1940–2019), Irish folk singer
- Dan Doyle (record producer) (fl. 1970s–2000s), American record producer
- Dan Doyle (politician) (fl. 2000s), former Republican state legislator and attorney from the U.S. state of Oregon
- DJ Doyle (fl. 2010s), television writer

== See also ==
- Daniel Boyle (disambiguation)
