= Catch Wrestling Association =

Professional wrestling organisation

- Acronym: CWA
- Founded: 1973 (as IBV)
- Defunct: 1999
- Headquarters: Austria; Germany
- Founder: Nico Selenkowitsch
- Owner: Otto Wanz
- Sister: Verband Der Berufsringer

The Catch Wrestling Association (CWA) was a professional wrestling organization based in Austria and Germany that was founded as the Internationaler Berufsringer Verband (IBV) in 1973. From the late 1980s it was known as the CWA in honour of the promotion's World Heavyweight Championship (originally claimed to be sanctioned by the fictitious Canadian Wrestling Association with previous lineage in North America.) This has since become a common retronym for the entire history of the organisation and often for the whole of late 20th Century German/Austrian Wrestling. It was founded by Nico Selenkowitsch and run by him until 1987 when he was succeeded by long-term champion Otto Wanz and Peter Wilhelm.

The CWA featured a traditional brand of mat wrestling mixed with various “Strong Man” competitions. During the late 1970s the then IBV overtook the old Verband der Berufsringer to become the dominant promotion in the German/Austrian wrestling territory, maintaining a high profile even after the invasion of the WWF circa 1990. After its closure it was replaced in 2000 by the European Wrestling Promotion (EWP), which was renamed the Catch Wrestling Promotion (CWP) in 2023.

The company was engaged in talent-share agreements with other wrestling promotions, including New Japan Pro-Wrestling (NJPW) and the American Wrestling Association (AWA). These agreements expanded the opportunities given to many European wrestlers. CWA's biggest card was the Euro Catch Festival, which was held twice a year (it was held in Graz, Austria in the summer, while in the winter, it was held in Bremen, Germany).

Matches were fought using European rules, including dividing matches into three-minute rounds and having the possibility of a victory by knockout. One distinct feature of the CWA, later bequeathed to EWP, was the playing of pop music records during the breaks between rounds. Rings were noticeably larger than in other European territories and often were covered in advertising/sponsorship messages. The CWA World Heavyweight Championship was recognized as the legitimate European World Championship as counterpart to the AWA, NWA and WWF titles in North America, the Universal Wrestling Association title in Mexico, NJPW's IWGP Heavyweight Championship in Japan and the Mountevans "WWA" World Heavyweight title in the UK. A championship claimed to be the CWA version was contested between Kendo Nagasaki and Giant Haystacks at Fairfield Halls Croydon in 1991 before BBC cameras for the documentary "Masters of the Canvas" screened the following year. (although at the time the actual holder was Rambo).

Until the move from France's TF1 to Eurosport of New Catch programme, mostly featuring the French EWF but also including CWA footage, the promotion did not have its own TV show but nonetheless from 1980 taped many of its matches for the home video market using highly professional multi camera arrangements. Inspired by this, rival VDB also released home videos in rougher setups using single handheld cameras. Some of the CWA matches were aired in Wales, United Kingdom, on Orig Williams Welsh language wrestling show Reslo on S4C. Many have since been uploaded to YouTube. CWA bouts were also included on Catch Up, a German TV programme on RTL Television 1989-1991 focused mainly on American wrestling news, primarily WCW.

== Championships ==
Championship	Date of entry	First champion(s) (Tag team name)	Date retired	Last champion(s) (Tag team name)	Years active
CWA World Heavyweight Championship	August 14, 1973	Otto Wanz	December 4, 1999	Rambo	1973–1999
CWA Intercontinental Heavyweight Championship	December 21, 1991	Bull Power	December 4, 1999	Tony St. Clair	1991–1999
CWA World Tag Team Championship	November 23, 1988	Mile Zrno and Tony St. Clair	December 4, 1999	Black Navy Seal and Ricky Santana	1988–1999
CWA British Commonwealth Championship	October 11, 1992	Tony St. Clair	December 4, 1999	Tony St. Clair	1992–1999
CWA German Championship	October 10, 1998	Christian Eckstein	December 4, 1999	Christian Eckstein	1998–1999
CWA Submission Shootfighting Championship	September 21, 1997	Osamu Nishimura	December 4, 1999	Tony St. Clair	1997–1999
CWA World Junior Heavyweight Championship	July 3, 1993	Hiroyoshi Yamamoto	September 1, 2000	Eric Schwarz	1993–2000
CWA World Middleweight Championship	December 22, 1984	Tony St. Clair	December 4, 1999	Franz Schumann	1984–1999

== Alumni ==
- André the Giant
- Chris Benoit
- Ludvig Borga (Tony Halme)
- Robbie Brookside (Robert Brooks)
- Duke Droese/Marshall Duke (Mike Droese)
- Dave "Fit" Finlay
- Tatsumi Fujinami
- John Hawk (John Layfield)
- Ulf Herman (Ulf Nadrowski)
- Barry Horowitz
- Don Leo Jonathan (Don Heaton)
- Marty Jones
- Owen Hart
- Texas Scott (Scott Hall)
- Takayuki Iizuka
- Fuji Yamaha (Michiyoshi Ohara)
- Jean-Pierre Lafitte/Carl Wallace (Carl Ouellet)
- Chris Jericho (Chris Irvine)
- Joe E. Legend (Joe Hitchen)
- Bob Orton Jr.
- Baron von Raschke
- Rhino Richards (Terry Gerin)
- Road Warrior Hawk (Michael Hegstrand)
- Paul Roma (Paul Centopani)
- Lance Storm (Lance Evers)
- Hiro Yamamoto (Hiroyoshi Yamamoto)
- Bull Power (Leon White)
- Otto Wanz
- Ultimate Warrior (Warrior)
- Papa Shango (Charles Wright)
- Larry Cameron
- Shinya Hashimoto
- Giant Haystacks
- Akira Nogami
- Joe-Joe Lee (Satoshi Kojima)
- Kendo Kashin (Tokimitsu Ishizawa)
- Buffalo Peterson/Heavy Metal Buffalo/Maxx Payne (Darryl Peterson)
- The Warlord (Terry Szopinski)
- Rambo (Luc Poirier)
- Mad Bull Buster (Anthony Durante)
- Osamu Nishimura
- Bonecrusher Dan Sileo
- David Taylor
- Cannonball Grizzly (Paul Neu)
- Ice Train (Harold Hogue)
- The Great Kokina (Rodney Anoa'i)
- Jushin Thunder Liger (Keiichi Yamada)
- Shaun Koen
- Mile Zrno
- Flyin' Scorpio/2 Cold Scorpio (Charles Scaggs)
- Salvatore Bellomo
- Drew McDonald
- Bruiser Mastino (Mike Hallick)
- Steve Regal (Darren Matthews)
- Rip Rogers
- Derrick Dukes
- Moondog Rex
- The Barbarian
- Bastion Booger
- Dan Collins
- Tiger Mike (Mike Lozansky)
- Mark Mercedes
- Kendo Sasaki (Kensuke Sasaki)
- Tony St. Clair
- Franz Schumann
- Sgt. Slaughter
- Mamdouh Farag

== See also ==
- List of professional wrestling promotions in Europe
