= Mark Rocco =

English professional wrestler (1951–2020)

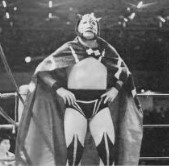
- Rocco dressed as Black Tiger in 1982

Personal information
- Born: Mark Hussey; 11 May 1951 Manchester, England
- Died: 30 July 2020 (aged 69) Warrington, Cheshire, England

Professional wrestling career
- Ring name(s): Mark Rocco; Black Tiger
- Billed height: 5 ft 8 in (1.73 m)
- Billed weight: 195 lb (88 kg)
- Trained by: Colin Joynson
- Debut: 1969
- Retired: 1991

Mark Hussey (11 May 1951 – 30 July 2020) was an English professional wrestler who competed for Joint Promotions, All Star Wrestling and the second BWF as Mark "Rollerball" Rocco and as the original masked Black Tiger in New Japan Pro-Wrestling (NJPW) during the 1970s and 1980s. A fourth-generation wrestler, he was the son of British wrestler "Jumping" Jim Hussey and the father of boxer Jono "Rocco" Hussey.

Regularly appearing on ITV's World of Sport and the later standalone ITV Wrestling show, he feuded with many of the top light heavyweight wrestlers of the era including Marty Jones, the Dynamite Kid, "Iron Fist" Clive Myers, Kendo Nagasaki and Satoru Sayama (billed in the UK as "Sammy Lee") in England. He and Sayama also feuded in Japan while both under masks, Sayama as Tiger Mask and Rocco as his nemesis Black Tiger.

== Professional wrestling career ==
=== Early career ===
Born in Manchester, Rocco grew up in his father's gym where other local wrestlers trained. Although his father was opposed to his being a professional wrestler, going so far as to have his son banned from his gym, Rocco would receive lessons from some of the veterans while his father was out on tour.

Rocco started amateur wrestling at age 16, competing as far away as southern France and Pakistan, was definitely wrestling professionally by July 1970, being then a regular at Northern venues such as Liverpool Stadium and Blackpool Tower. In July 1970 he appeared on the bill with his father Jim Hussey in a match against Ivan Penzecoff at the Granada, East Ham in London.

Making his debut in Dale Martin's London territory under the Joint Promotions banner, he became a rising star in the organisation, defeating Bert Royal (wrestler) for the British Heavy Middleweight Championship on 11 June 1977 and was involved in televised high-profile matches with Marty Jones before losing the title to him on 13 September 1978.

After Jones vacated the title, Rocco regained the title after defeating then-rookie Chris Adams in a tournament final on 6 December 1978. Rocco lost the championship to Adams a few months later, and regained it towards the middle of 1979.

Touring North America the following year, he teamed with Greg Gagne and briefly competed in the World Wide Wrestling Federation, one of his opponents being Terry Bollea.

In 1981, Rocco had his first feud with Satoru Sayama, then wrestling in Britain as Sammy Lee. Rocco was scheduled to wrestle Lee for the World Heavy-Middleweight title (recognised as vacant by Joint Promotions) at Wembley Arena that year on the undercard of the famous Big Daddy versus Giant Haystacks grudge match, but this was cancelled after Lee returned to Japan due to a family bereavement. Rocco was awarded Joint Promotions recognition as champion by default that night; later that year he defeated Joel de Fremery at a TV taping in Southport for the main European version of the World Heavy Middleweight title. Vacating his British title to concentrate on the World title, Rocco feuded intensely with a returning Dynamite Kid, culminating in a World title match in Lewisham, South London that ended in a double knockout.

=== New Japan Pro-Wrestling ===
After his series of highly regarded matches, Rocco was contacted by New Japan Pro-Wrestling to wrestle a series of matches against Lee/Sayama in Japan. Wrestling under the name Black Tiger, against Sayama's Tiger Mask character, Rocco and Tiger Mask's matches were some of the highest-rated in Japanese television history. The success of this series of matches between the original Black Tiger and original Tiger Mask would be followed with later incarnations of wrestlers to have competed under both the Black Tiger and Tiger Mask names in later years.

The rivalry between the two Tigers continued throughout 1982, as the two feuded over the WWF Junior Heavyweight Championship after Rocco defeated Gran Hamada in a tournament final for the title in Fukuoka on 6 May before losing it back to Tiger Mask less than a month later in Tokyo, Japan on 26 May 1982.

Rocco made further visits to Japan in the late 1980s where he and Keiichi Yamada would recreate their UK feud. In 1989, as Black Tiger, Rocco fought with Yamada's own superhero alter ego, Jushin Liger. He was also involved in Liger's early training.

=== All Star Wrestling ===
Back home in Britain, Rocco was lured away from the TV/Joint Promotions spotlight by independent promoter Orig Williams. Crucial to the defection was that Rocco brought his World Heavy Middleweight championship with him. Rocco agreed and made the jump, also working for promoter Brian Dixon, whose Wrestling Enterprises promotion evolved into All Star Wrestling. When not on tour in Japan or elsewhere overseas, Rocco would continue to work for Dixon for the remainder of his career. Dixon would later comment that Rocco was his best employee, both as a worker and as a loyal friend.

In 1983, Rocco appeared during All Star Wrestling's national tour of Great Britain and issued an open challenge for a non-title match to any wrestler in the promotion. Accepted by Frank "Chic" Cullen, he was defeated by Rocco although they shook hands following the match.

During the second week of the tour, after defeating Mike Jordan in a singles match, Rocco challenged the Dynamite Kid who had also recently returned from NJPW to a match later that night. Agreeing to a tag team match, he and Fit Finlay would later lose to Dynamite Kid and Marty Jones at the end of the night after Dynamite Kid pinned Finlay. The following week he again challenged the Dynamite Kid challenging him to a 30-minute "iron man" match which resulted in a time limit draw with one pinfall each. This led to a brutal feud between the two, which would lead to many aggressive, bloody encounters, culminating in the Dynamite Kid challenging Rocco to a ladder match for his World Heavy Middleweight title. Rocco successfully defended the title after he had tied the Dynamite Kid's arms to the cord of the area curtains. He would later defend the title in a rematch against Cullen, Robbie Brookside and his former tag team partner The Cobra during the last weeks of the tour.

In late 1985, Rocco lost his title to Cullen but regained it a few days later. The following year, he faced the challenge of Yamada, now billed by All Star as "Flying" Fuji Yamada. During the second half of 1986, Rocco lost his title to Yamada, regained it and then lost it again. During this feud, All Star finally gained a share of ITV's wrestling coverage and so when Rocco finally won the belt back in Lewisham in March 1987, it was televised nationally.

=== Tag team and feud with Kendo Nagasaki ===
Another televised confrontation between Rocco and Yamada would come in 1987, on opposite sides of a tag match. Yamada and his tag partner in Britain, "Ironfist" Clive Myers had challenged legendary masked wrestler Kendo Nagasaki to a tag team match and, having a shared rival in Yamada, Rocco volunteered. Nagasaki and Rocco defeated Yamada and Myers in the main event of a TV taping at the Fairfield Hall Croydon.

Following this match, Nagasaki and Rocco would continue to team until a year later at another televised Croydon tag match, where the team collapsed in spectacular fashion while facing Myers and Dave Taylor. Taylor was attempting, mid-match, to unmask Nagasaki and had nearly succeeded when Rocco intervened. Rocco attempted to pull the mask back down, but Taylor forearm-smashed Rocco, causing the mask to come off in his hands. As Taylor and Myers celebrated, Nagasaki fled to the dressing room and returned with another mask. Nagasaki's manager George Gillette blamed Rocco for the unmasking, igniting a major feud that would run on into the early 1990s.

=== Tours of mainland Europe ===
In June 1988, he teamed with Dave Finlay losing to Mile Zrno & Tony St. Clair in a match to crown the first CWA World Tag Team Champions in Linz, Austria.

Rocco also wrestled in France for Roger Delaporte's Fédération Française de Catch Professionnel going back to the late 1970s. One of his World Heavy Middleweight title defences, against Danny Boy Collins in Paris, France in 1988, was aired on French national TV station TF1's New Catch programme. This was later rescreened in 1991 on Eurosport, with Williams providing English commentary.

=== Retirement ===
In 1990, Rocco emigrated to Tenerife.

In 1991, Rocco collapsed in the dressing room following a match against Fit Finlay in Worthing. Rocco, who had been suffering from pain in his back and kidneys since a match against Dave Taylor the previous night, was taken to a nearby hospital where doctors found his heart was working at only 30% and diagnosed him with a heart condition which forced him to retire from professional wrestling. He vacated his World championship, which was soon after won by Robbie Brookside in a tournament.

=== 2002–2013 ===
Following the retirement of Cullen in 2002, ten years into an unbeaten reign with Rocco's old World Heavy-Middleweight title he had won from Brookside in 1992, the following year Rocco and Cullen came together to oversee a tournament to crown a successor, won by future WWE star "American Dragon" Bryan Danielson, to whom Rocco and Cullen personally presented the belt.

In August 2006, he and his father received a lifetime achievement award at the 15th Southern Wrestlers' Reunion at South Darenth, Kent. During the event, Rocco also presented a lifetime achievement award to promoter Brian Dixon. Rollerball Rocco was the subject of the 2011 song "Inside the Restless Mind of Rollerball Rocco" by English musician Luke Haines. It is featured on Haines' psychedelic rock concept album about British wrestlers entitled "9 1/2 Psychedelic Meditations on British Wrestling of the 1970's And Early 1980's".

In September 2012, Rocco was named as one of the mentors on the Challenge reality television programme TNA Wrestling: British Boot Camp. In June 2013, he was interviewed on The Art of Wrestling with Colt Cabana.

== Championships and accomplishments ==
- All Star Wrestling
  - World Heavy Middleweight Championship (3 times - second, third and fourth reigns only of four total)
- Joint Promotions
  - World Heavy Middleweight Championship (1 time - first reign only of four total)
  - British Heavy Middleweight Championship (2 times)
  - British Light Heavyweight Championship (1 time)
- Pro Wrestling Illustrated
  - PWI ranked him #298 of the 500 best singles wrestlers of the PWI 500 in 1991
- Wrestling Observer Newsletter
  - Wrestling Observer Newsletter Hall of Fame (Class of 2022)
- World Wrestling Federation
  - WWF Junior Heavyweight Championship (1 time)

== Death ==
Hussey died on 30 July 2020, in a care home in Warrington at the age of 69. According to some friends of Hussey's family on a Facebook page, he was battling dementia for a long period of his life, and his health deteriorated in his last days.
