= Fit Finlay =

Northern Irish professional wrestler and trainer (born 1958)

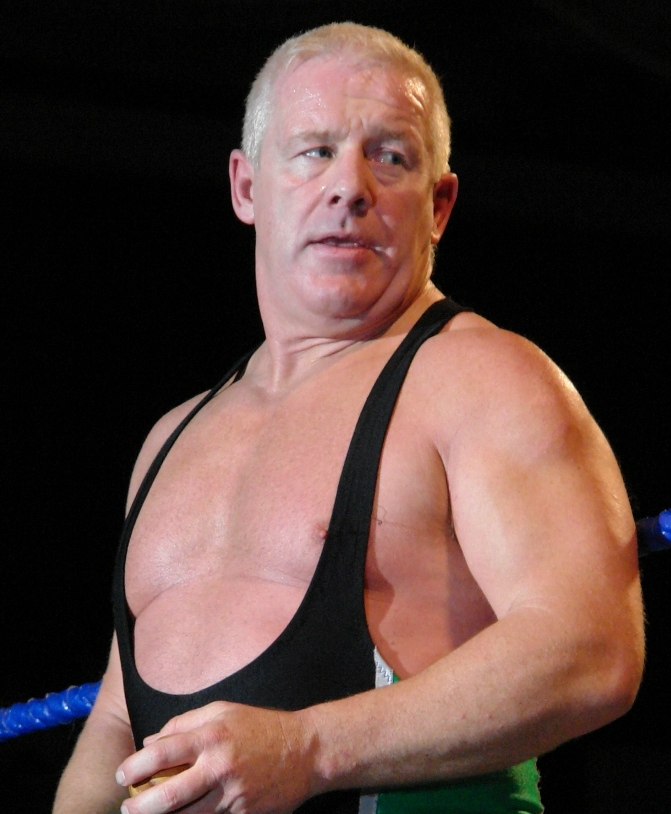
- Finlay in 2008

Personal information
- Born: David John Finlay, Jr. 31 January 1958 (age 68) Carrickfergus, County Antrim, Northern Ireland
- Spouses: Paula Valdez (divorced) Melanie Duffin (m. 1998)
- Children: 3, including David and Brogan

Professional wrestling career
- Ring name(s): David Finlay; Dave Finlay; Dave "Fit" Finlay; Fit Finlay; Fit Finley; Finlay; Sir Finlay; The Belfast Bruiser; Young Apollo
- Billed height: 6 ft 2 in (188 cm)
- Billed weight: 233 lb (106 kg)
- Billed from: Belfast, Ireland; Belfast, Northern Ireland
- Trained by: Dave Finlay Sr. Ted Betley
- Debut: 1974
- Retired: 22 December 2012

David John "Fit" Finlay Jr. (born 31 January 1958) is a Northern Irish professional wrestling trainer and former wrestler. He is signed to WWE as a trainer and assistant coach at the Performance Center, as well as a producer. He is best known for his tenures with World Championship Wrestling (WCW) from 1996 to 2000, and in WWE from 2005 to 2010 under the mononymous name Finlay.

Finlay debuted in 1974, and has held over 20 championships around the world throughout his career, including the WCW World Television Championship and the WWE United States Championship. He is also well known for his coaching to other wrestlers, notably for his training contributions to the WWE women's division.

== Early life ==
Finlay was born in Carrickfergus, County Antrim in 1958. His father, Dave Finlay Sr., is a former amateur and professional wrestler and coach, who was appointed MBE in the 2024 New Year Honours "For Services to Olympic Wrestling in Northern Ireland". His grandfather was also a wrestler, and his sister was a referee. His uncle, Albert Finlay, was a goalkeeper for Glentoran F.C. in the 1960s and 1970s.

== Professional wrestling career ==
=== Early career (1974–1989) ===
Finlay's first match was for his father's promotion in Glynn in 1974, when he filled in for a wrestler who no-showed. He began wrestling on a full-time basis in his hometown of Carrickfergus and throughout Northern Ireland and the Republic of Ireland for the next four years before moving to England in 1978. In England, he wrestled for independent promoters such as Jackie Pallo, Orig Williams and Brian Dixon. On a visit to France in August 1980 Finlay made his television debut, teaming with Ian Gilmour as "Scotsmen" to lose to Guy Mercier (father of Marc Mercier) and Alan Mitchells. Around this time, he began working for various companies under the Joint Promotions banner. Finlay defeated Alan Kilby on 9 June 1982 to win his first title, the Joint Promotions British Heavy Middleweight Championship. He also formed the Riot Squad tag team with Skull Murphy (Peter Northey), together winning the 1982 World of Sport Top Tag Team Tournament. At this time, Finlay's then-wife, "Princess" Paula (Valdez), became his manager. Dressed in a Native American headdress, she would frequently admonish her husband for mistakes in the ring.

He then won a tournament to crown a new British Light Heavyweight champion and fill the vacant position, defeating Ringo Rigby in the finals. Finlay soon lost the championship, but later pinned Marty Jones to win the World Mid-Heavyweight Championship. He traded it back and forth with Jones for over two years before losing it a final time to Jones via disqualification. He defeated Jones to win Joint Promotions' British Light Heavyweight Championship. In the second half of the 1980s, he defeated Frank "Chic" Cullen on television for the British Heavy Middleweight Championship, but later lost it to Danny Collins. In 1990 he became a champion at the top of the weight range when he won All Star's British Heavyweight Championship. Finlay often competed on ITV's World of Sport programme as Dave "Fit" Finlay on which he had many matches against Jones, Collins, Big Daddy (whom he fought on TV during coverage of the 1984 and 1986 FA Cup Final matches) and "The American Dream" Steve Adonis, as well as on Williams' Welsh language wrestling show, Reslo, for S4C.

=== Catch Wrestling Association (1986–1995, 1996–1997) ===
During this time, Finlay also began to wrestle in Japan, then in Germany and Austria for the European promotion Catch Wrestling Association, alongside Paula, who was sometimes billed as Princess Beautiful. While holding the British Heavyweight championship, he teamed with former rival Marty Jones to win the CWA tag title from Tony St. Clair and Mile Zrno. The two would later team back home in the United Kingdom after Jones turned heel in 1992. After losing the British championship to Dave Taylor, Finlay began to focus more on the CWA, winning many of their championships.

Finlay teamed with Mark Rocco and Murphy in a 1989 WWF dark match in London, defeating the team of Al Perez, Dusty Wolfe and Tim Horner. On July 3, 1993, he defeated Robert Fasser for the vacated the CWA Intercontinental Title. On November 25, 1995, he defeated Paul Roma for the CWA Mittelgewicht Championship. He left the CWA in December 1995 and went to World Championship Wrestling (WCW).

In 1996, he returned to CWA after a stint in WCW. He dropped the CWA Mittelgewicht Championship to Franz Schuhmann in July of that year. His last match with CWA was in September 1997 and returned to WCW. The CWA Intercontinental Title was vacated in October 1998.

=== World Championship Wrestling (1996–2001) ===
==== The Belfast Bruiser (1996) ====
Finlay made his American wrestling debut in World Championship Wrestling (WCW) in 1996, going by the ring name of The Belfast Bruiser. Finlay made his WCW debut on 27 January episode of Saturday Night by emerging from the stands to viciously attack Lord Steven Regal, with Tony Schiavone stating "It says Northern Ireland on the back of his jacket", as the only means of identification at the time. He then cut a promo to the camera in which he introduced himself and declared that Regal was an "English pig" who was "paying for 400 years" of English-Irish conflict. This marked the beginning of a lengthy feud between the Bruiser and Regal. Bruiser won his first match in WCW on 10 February episode of Saturday Night by defeating enhancement talent Mike Marcello. The feud played out over subsequent Saturday Night episodes in which the Bruiser and Regal's stablemates The Blue Bloods (Squire David Taylor and Earl Robert Eaton) interfered in each other's matches. The Bruiser won a stiff encounter with Regal by disqualification at Uncensored when the Blue Bloods again rushed the ring and assaulted him after Regal suffered a broken nose during the match. The following night on Nitro, Bruiser suffered his first loss in WCW against Randy Savage.

After Regal pinned the Bruiser in a parking lot brawl on 29 April episode of Nitro, the feud died down thereafter. The injuries sustained from the match would lead to Bruiser being removed from his scheduled tag team match with Regal at Slamboree. Finlay would then take a hiatus off WCW television he returned to Catch Wrestling Association, while abandoning the Belfast Bruiser persona in the process.

==== World Television Champion (1997–1998) ====
Finlay returned to WCW on 1 October 1997 by defeating Dave Taylor at a live event. He made his televised return on the 25 October episode of Saturday Night as Fit Finlay, sporting a new look of short bleached-blond hair and no mustache. He defeated Barry Houston in his televised return match. He participated in the World War 3 battle royal at the namesake event on 23 November for a future WCW World Heavyweight Championship title shot, but failed to win the match.

He was given a push upon his return, winning the majority of his matches in the mid-card. This culminated in him pinning Booker T to win the World Television Championship on the 4 May 1998 episode of Nitro, thus setting off a three-way feud with Booker and Chris Benoit, who was also vying for the title. Finlay retained the title against Benoit at Slamboree. Finlay also regularly defended the title on weekly WCW television against the likes of Chavo Guerrero Jr., Kaos, The Renegade, Brad Armstrong, Jim Neidhart, Norman Smiley and Psychosis, before losing the World Television Championship back to Booker T at The Great American Bash. Finlay unsuccessfully challenged Booker for the title in a rematch on the 2 July episode of Thunder. He received another title shot for the title against Chris Jericho on the 17 October episode of Saturday Night but the match ended in a time limit draw.

Shortly after his title loss, Finlay began feuding with Alex Wright, who was angry at Finlay for having ended the wrestling career of his father, Steve Wright, which led to a match between the two at Halloween Havoc, where Finlay was pinned by Wright. However, Finlay defeated Wright in a rematch on the 29 October episode of Thunder. Finlay would then team with WCW colleague Jerry Flynn to participate in New Japan Pro-Wrestling's Super Grade Tag League, with their team losing all of their matches in the tournament and coming in last place. He returned from the tour of NJPW in December and then teamed with Flynn against Brian Adams and Scott Norton in a losing effort at Starrcade.

==== The Hardcore Army (1999–2001) ====
After defeating Van Hammer at the Souled Out pay-per-view on 17 January 1999, Finlay was randomly paired with Dave Taylor to participate in a tournament for the vacant World Tag Team Championship, where they lost to The Faces of Fear in a lumberjack match in the opening round, thus moving to the Losers' Bracket, where they defeated Billy Kidman and Chavo Guerrero Jr. in the opening round but lost to Chris Benoit and Dean Malenko in the second round. On the 10 June episode of Thunder, Finlay unsuccessfully challenged Rick Steiner for the World Television Championship. In the summer of 1999, Finlay resumed his alliance with Taylor, which also expanded to include former rival Steven Regal, but the trio did not achieve much success. During that time, Finlay began competing in the emerging hardcore division. At Bash at the Beach, he won a Junkyard Invitational involving Ciclope, Jerry Flynn, Johnny Grunge, Hak, Horace Hogan, Brian Knobbs, Hugh Morrus, La Parka, Steve Regal, Rocco Rock, Silver King, Dave Taylor, and Mikey Whipwreck, winning what was initially announced to be for the "WCW Hardcore Championship", although the actual lineage would not begin until Mayhem (1999), thus leaving Finlay with a trophy instead of an actual championship.

He legitimately suffered a badly lacerated nerve in his leg during a hardcore match at a house show in Jackson, Mississippi on 25 July 1999, which nearly cost him use of the leg. As he was wrestling Knobbs, he was thrown into a table in the corner of the ring, causing it to shatter and the shards to cut into his leg. He managed to regain use of the limb and would return to WCW at Starrcade by assisting Knobbs in interfering in Norman Smiley's Hardcore Championship title defense against Meng. Finlay unsuccessfully challenged Smiley for the Hardcore Championship on the 23 December episode of Thunder. In his continued pursuit of the Hardcore Championship, Finlay began regularly teaming with Knobbs as well. At the 2000 Souled Out event, Finlay unsuccessfully challenged Knobbs for the Hardcore Championship in a four-way match, also involving Smiley and Meng.

Shortly after, Finlay formed a trio of the "Hardcore Army" with Knobbs and The Dog as they defeated 3 Count in a hardcore match on the 1 March episode of Thunder. They feuded with Vampiro, leading to a falls count anywhere match between Finlay and Vampiro at Uncensored, which Finlay lost. Finlay left wrestling in the summer of 2000 and accepted the position of a backstage road agent for WCW. His final match in WCW was at Millennium Final, where he competed twice, firstly in a battle royal and secondly in an Octoberfest Hardcore match against Smiley in a losing effort. Finlay remained in the company as a road agent until WCW was bought by the World Wrestling Federation (WWF) in 2001.

=== World Wrestling Federation/Entertainment (2001–2011) ===
==== Trainer (2001–2004) ====
When WCW was purchased by the World Wrestling Federation (WWF; now WWE), Finlay began working for the company as a trainer for new wrestlers. He trained future WWE champions John Cena and Randy Orton and was eventually put in charge of training the WWE Divas for their matches. In May 2001, he wrestled three matches in Germany and England.

==== In-ring return and United States Champion (2004–2006) ====
Finlay began working on a comeback on 21 March 2004, wrestling in a match defeating Jamie Noble at a house show in Glasgow and losing to Heidenreich in a house show in Belfast on 8 October. Promos began airing for his impending in-ring return on 30 December 2005. His gimmick was that of a proud native Irishman who loved to fight. At the age of 47, Finlay made his televised debut on the 20 January 2006 edition of SmackDown! against Matt Hardy, which ended in a disqualification after he refused to break a five-count while pummelling Hardy against the ropes. After the match, Finlay stomped Hardy's face into the ring steps, establishing himself as a villain. This earned him the nickname "The Fighting Irish Bastard".

Finlay continued to establish himself on the SmackDown! roster. During February and March 2006, he feuded with Bobby Lashley that began after he cost Lashley his unbeaten streak by interfering in Lashley's match with John "Bradshaw" Layfield (JBL) at No Way Out on 19 February. This feud would see the pair brawl on many occasions, including a parking lot segment in which Lashley tried to overturn a car onto Finlay. Later, the pair competed in a Money in the Bank qualifier lumberjack match that Finlay won. During this time, Finlay began to wield a shillelagh as a weapon. On 2 April, Finlay competed at his first WrestleMania, WrestleMania 22. He faced five other WWE superstars from both the Raw and SmackDown! brands in a Money in the Bank ladder match, which also included Lashley, who won a last chance battle royal. This match was eventually won by Rob Van Dam. Finlay next entered the King of the Ring tournament on SmackDown!, defeating his first round opponent Chris Benoit on 5 May episode of SmackDown!, before being beaten by his rival Lashley, who advanced to the finals at Judgment Day on 21 May. Finlay helped the other finalist, Booker T, defeat Lashley in the King of the Ring finals. At Judgment Day, Finlay lost to Benoit.

Beginning on the 26 May episode of SmackDown!, Finlay was joined by Little Bastard, who came out from under the ring to attack Finlay's opponents. Finlay then joined forces with William Regal as loyal subjects of the newly renamed King Booker and his Court. Both men were later "knighted" by the King, and Finlay briefly used the name Sir Finlay. During his time as part of the court, Finlay picked up a win against World Heavyweight Champion Rey Mysterio in a non-title match before defeating the court's main foe Bobby Lashley to take Lashley's United States Championship on 14 July episode of SmackDown!. Finlay defended the championship on several occasions, often with help from Little Bastard, and even defended it against Regal, his fellow court member, at The Great American Bash on 23 July. He lost the title to Mr. Kennedy on the 1 September edition of SmackDown! in a Triple Threat match that also involved Bobby Lashley. After the title loss, Finlay continued to attack and wrestle threats to court leader King Booker and his newly won World Heavyweight Championship, including Lashley and Batista. Finlay defeated King Booker in a non-title singles match and lost in a fatal four-way match at No Mercy on 8 October for the title. After leaving the court, Finlay continued to feud with Batista. At Armageddon on 17 December, Finlay and King Booker faced Batista and his partner, WWE Champion John Cena from Raw but were defeated.

==== Alliance with Hornswoggle (2007–2009) ====
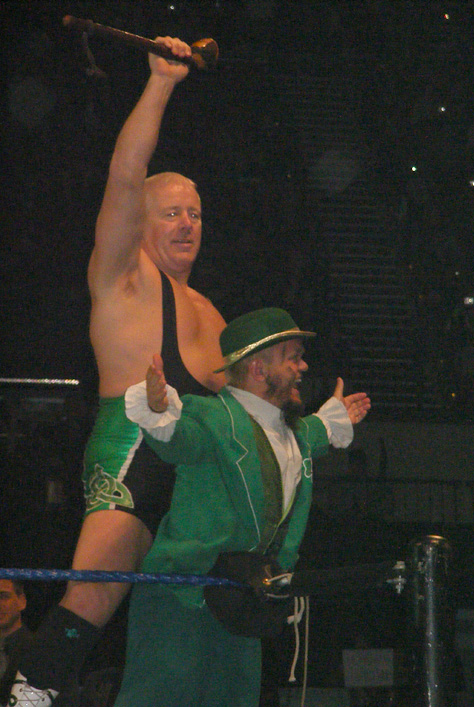
Finlay with his on-screen son Hornswoggle

Shortly after the Royal Rumble on 28 January 2007 (where Finlay entered the Royal Rumble match as the number two entrant and lasted 32 minutes), Finlay began a feud with The Boogeyman. At No Way Out on 18 February, he and Little Bastard defeated The Boogeyman and The Little Boogeyman. Finlay earned a place in the Money in the Bank ladder match at WrestleMania 23 on 1 April; however, Mr. Kennedy won the match. Following this loss, he would feud with Kennedy, after an attack on Little Bastard (now renamed "Hornswoggle") during the Money in the Bank match, and Jamie Noble for assaulting Hornswoggle after he won the Cruiserweight Championship. Finlay's feud, however, would quickly redirect to Kane after Finlay accidentally spilled coffee on him. The two also became involved with Batista and The Great Khali. On 18 August episode of Saturday Night's Main Event, Finlay and Khali lost to Batista and Kane. Kane beat Finlay at SummerSlam on 26 August. Finlay defeated Kane in a Belfast Brawl rematch a few weeks later on 14 September episode of SmackDown!.

Finlay and Hornswoggle briefly separated when Hornswoggle was stripped of the Cruiserweight title, and briefly moving to Raw with his "illegitimate father", Mr. McMahon. Finlay then feuded with Rey Mysterio by attacking him during a confrontational interview with JBL. At No Mercy on 7 October, Finlay faked an injury after taking a bump to the outside. Once placed on a stretcher, Finlay suddenly rose and attacked Mysterio, forcing Mysterio to be carried out on the stretcher. The feud continued at Cyber Sunday on 28 October, where fans voted for the two to face-off in a Stretcher match. Mysterio came out on top, but Finlay retaliated with a victory on the edition of 9 November of SmackDown!. The feud ended when the two faced on opposite teams at Survivor Series on 18 November, which Finlay's team lost.

Finlay reunited with Hornswoggle by coming to rescue him in a match against The Great Khali, turning both Finlay and Hornswoggle faces. At Armageddon on 16 December, Finlay was placed in a match with Khali. Finlay scored an upset win after Hornswoggle interfered by hitting Khali in the groin with a shillelagh. Still battling Khali and his translator, Ranjin Singh, with Hornswoggle, he qualified for the Royal Rumble on 27 January 2008. He drew number 27, but was immediately disqualified when he entered before his time to save Hornswoggle. Hornswoggle, who was also a competitor in the Rumble, was disqualified as well. Finlay fought in the SmackDown Elimination Chamber match to determine the number one contender for the World Heavyweight Championship at No Way Out on 17 February, ultimately being pinned after a chokeslam on the steel floor by The Undertaker.

Finlay then began making occasional appearances on Raw to protect Hornswoggle from Mr. McMahon, who had been showing him "tough love". After Hornswoggle was injured by JBL in a steel cage match, JBL revealed that Finlay, and not McMahon, was Hornswoggle's father. A week after, on 3 March, Finlay admitted to this fact. At WrestleMania XXIV on 30 March, Finlay was defeated by JBL in a Belfast Brawl, where Hornswoggle also reappeared.

As part of the 2008 WWE supplemental draft on 25 June, Finlay was drafted to the ECW brand. He and Hornswoggle challenged John Morrison and the Miz for the WWE Tag Team Championship at Night of Champions on 29 June, but lost. Throughout the rest of 2008, Finlay challenged for the ECW Championship. He, along with Matt Hardy, Chavo Guerrero, The Miz and ECW Champion Mark Henry participated in the first ever Championship Scramble match at Unforgiven on 7 September, which was won by Hardy. Finlay defeated Mark Henry on an episode of ECW to earn an opportunity for the ECW World Heavyweight Championship, but was defeated by Hardy. Then Finlay started a feud with Henry, and the feud ended when Finlay defeated Henry in a Belfast Brawl match at Armageddon on 14 December.

==== Brand switches and departure (2009–2011) ====
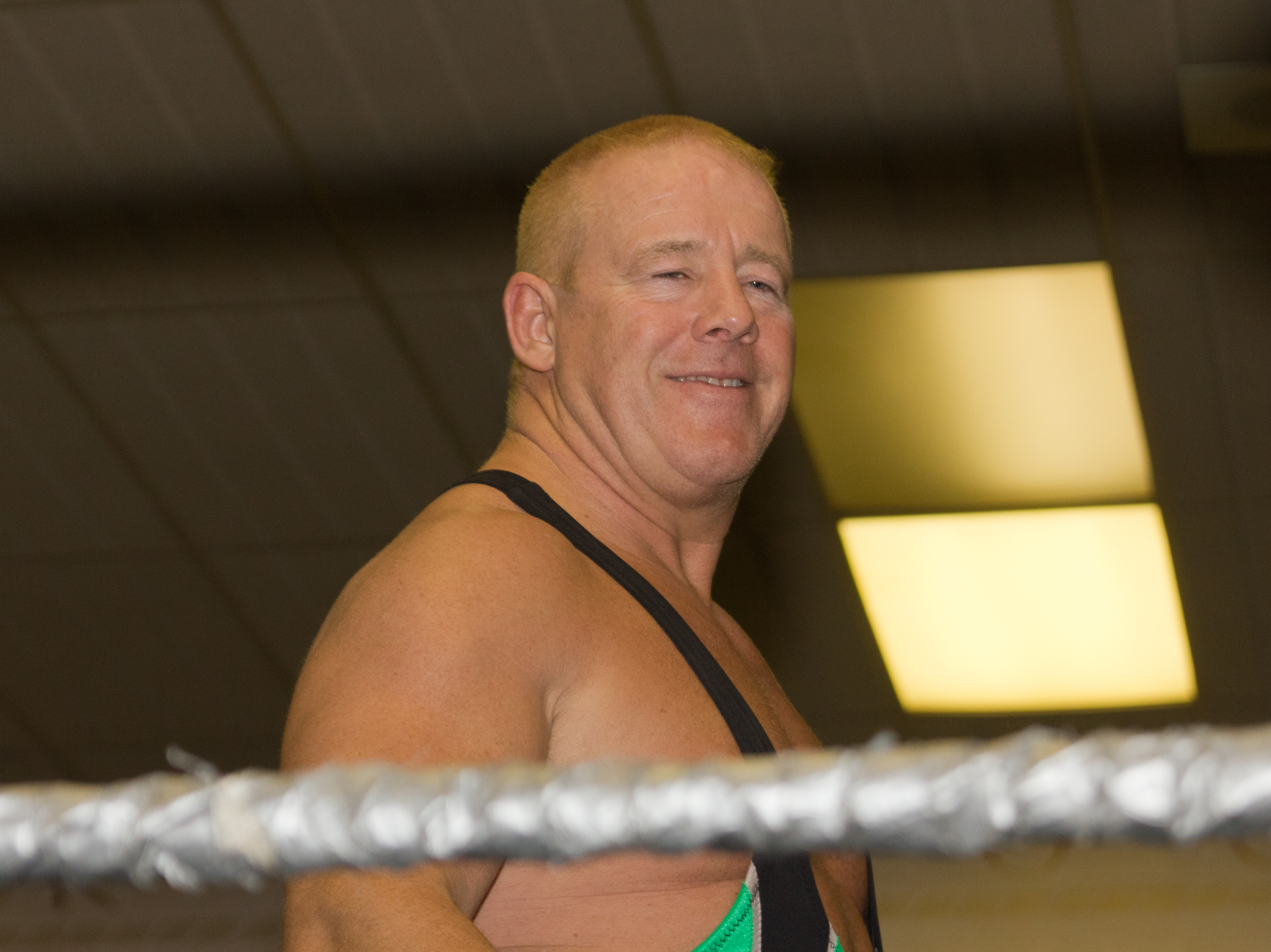
Finlay in 2011

Finlay entered his third Royal Rumble match at the Royal Rumble on 25 January 2009, where he entered at number 14 and lasted 30 minutes before being eliminated by Kane. At No Way Out on 15 February, Finlay faced Jack Swagger for the ECW Championship in a losing effort. On the 13 March episode of SmackDown, Finlay defeated The Brian Kendrick to qualify for the Money in the Bank ladder match at WrestleMania 25 on 5 April. At WrestleMania, Finlay failed to win the match as it was won by CM Punk. In the 2009 Supplemental Draft, Finlay and Hornswoggle were separated when Hornswoggle was drafted to Raw. In late May, Finlay suffered a legitimate eye injury, sidelining him temporarily. He returned on 16 June episode of ECW, attacking ECW Champion Tommy Dreamer, Christian, and Jack Swagger. At The Bash on 28 June, he participated in a Championship Scramble match for the ECW Championship, which also included Christian, Swagger and Henry, but Dreamer retained the title. Finlay did not return to ECW after that.

He was traded to the SmackDown brand on 29 June. He went on to form part of John Morrison's team at Survivor Series on 22 November, but was eliminated by Sheamus, and his team eventually lost. Finlay began pursuing the Intercontinental Championship by feuding with Drew McIntyre, which he failed to win. His final televised match in WWE was on the 4 June 2010 episode of SmackDown, where he competed in a 15-man battle royal. He failed to win as the match was won by former rival Rey Mysterio. Between June and October, Finlay worked in house shows. In October 2010, Finlay retired from WWE and became a backstage producer.

Finlay was released by WWE in March 2011 after authorising the interruption of the US national anthem by The Miz during a house show, which offended many, including National Guard members who were in attendance. Finlay stated that his intention was to intensify the audience's dislike of the Miz in preparation for the latter's WrestleMania XXVII main event match against John Cena for the Miz's WWE Championship, but accepted full responsibility for his dismissal.

=== Independent circuit and retirement (2011–2012) ===
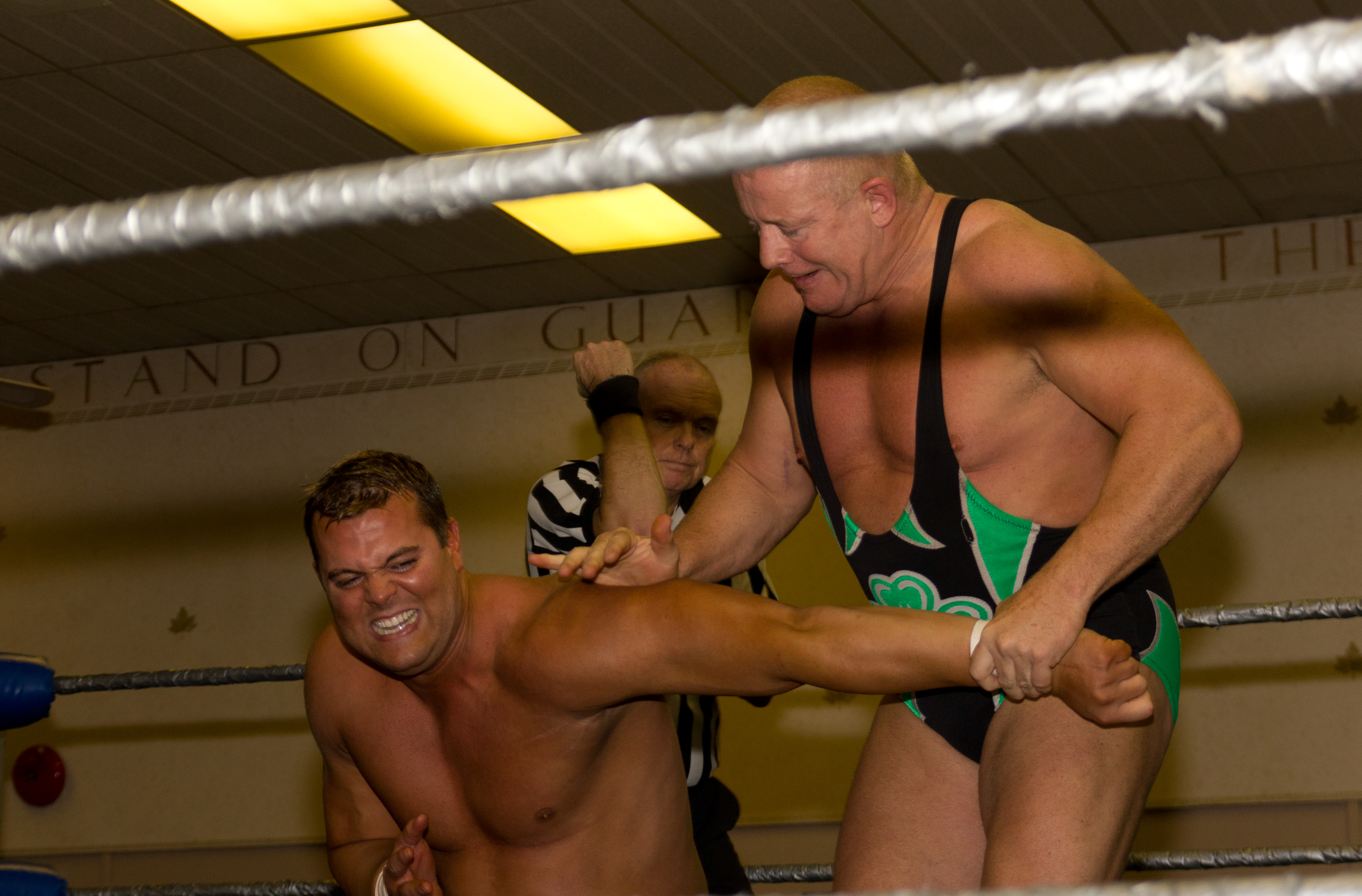
Finlay wrestling Harry Smith in November 2011

After being released from WWE, Finlay was contacted by Total Nonstop Action Wrestling (TNA) several times, but was unable to agree upon contractual terms. He began to wrestle again on the independent circuit, making his first appearance on 26 July 2011, defeating Sami Callihan at Evolve 9.

On 20 August 2011, Finlay made his debut for Pro Wrestling Guerrilla (PWG), taking part in the 2011 Battle of Los Angeles tournament. He was eliminated from the tournament in the first round by PWG World Champion Kevin Steen.

On 28 October 2011, Finlay's debut for Yoshihiro Tajiri's Smash promotion was announced, when he was revealed as the mysterious "King of Terror", Michael Kovac had promised to bring to the promotion and named first ever Smash Champion StarBuck's first challenger for the title. On 24 November at Smash.23, Finlay defeated StarBuck to become the new Smash Champion. On 19 February, Finlay made his first successful defence of the Smash Championship, defeating Tajiri. Prior to the event, Smash had announced that it would cease its operations on 14 March, which led to Finlay vacating the Smash Championship after the title defence.

On 6 November 2011, Finlay wrestled in the main event of a Stampede Wrestling show in Barrie, Ontario in a losing effort against Harry Smith.

On 21 January 2012, Fit Finlay returned to DOA Pro Wrestling in Portland, Oregon to face Ethan H. D. for the DOA Heavyweight Championship.

On 12 May 2012, at Border Wars, Finlay made his debut for Ring of Honor (ROH), unsuccessfully challenging Roderick Strong for the ROH World Television Championship. On 24 May, Finlay made his debut for Wrestling New Classic (WNC), the follow-up promotion to Smash, defeating Akira in the main event. Two days later, Finlay defeated Zeus in the main event of another WNC event. Finlay's first tour of WNC concluded on 27 May, when he, Akira and Syuri defeated Kana, Mikey Whipwreck and Tajiri in a six-person main event. On 24 June at ROH's Best in the World 2012: Hostage Crisis iPPV, Finlay was defeated by Michael Elgin.

Finlay returned to WNC on 20 September, when he defeated Ray Mendoza Jr. in the main event at Korakuen Hall. Following the match, Finlay announced that he was done with WNC for the time being due to re-signing with WWE. Despite no longer scheduled to make appearances for WNC, Finlay was named the head of the WNC Championship Committee.

On 6 October 2012 at Hangover No.5 in Hanover, Germany, an EWP World Heavyweight Championship match between challenger Finlay and champion Cannonball Grizzly ended in a no contest when Finlay's cornerman Robbie Brookside turned on him and attacked both competitors, then challenged Finlay to a Liverpool street fight. Finlay agreed provided this could be a tag team contest and he could team with his son David Finlay Jr. Consequently, Finlay wrestled his retirement match on 22 December 2012 at the same venue, teaming with his son David Finlay Jr. to defeat Brookside and "Dirty" Dan Collins in an Irish street fight.

=== Return to WWE (2012–present) ===
Finlay returned to WWE on 11 July 2012 as a backstage producer. During the following years, Finlay made some cameo appearances, usually separating brawling wrestlers. He was also one of four wrestlers who presented Tyler Bate with the WWE UK Championship after Bate won the related tournament in January 2017. After Lana was unable to compete in the 2019 women's Royal Rumble match following an attack by Nia Jax during her entrance, Finlay gave fellow Irish wrestler Becky Lynch permission to replace Lana; Lynch would go on to win the match and subsequently headline WrestleMania 35, where she would win both the Raw Women's Championship and SmackDown Women's Championship in a Winner Takes All triple threat match against Ronda Rousey and Charlotte Flair.

On 16 April 2020, Finlay was among the several WWE employees who were furloughed as part of the COVID-19 budget cuts but returned to work in November of the same year. In November, he was re-hired as a trainer and assistant coach at the WWE Performance Center in Orlando, Florida.

== Legacy ==
Finlay has received praise from fellow professional wrestlers and peers. He reportedly assisted in the transition of WWE's presentation of the WWE Divas from bra and panties matches to more respectful traditional wrestling. Former WWE Diva Victoria attested: "He made us and molded us. He got to know what made us tick, exposed that, and there was nothing we couldn't do. Today, the girls pick and choose what moves they want to do. If Fit Finlay wasn't around, that wouldn't happen. We worked stiff. We made contact."

Other women wrestlers such as Torrie Wilson, Lita, Jazz, Stacy Keibler, Molly Holly, The Bella Twins, Beth Phoenix, Natalya, Trish Stratus, Ruby Riott, Liv Morgan, Sarah Logan, Sasha Banks, Charlotte Flair, Becky Lynch, Lana, Bayley, and Ronda Rousey have credited Finlay for helping them hone their wrestling abilities and find their identities. They described Finlay as "an incredible wrestler and patient coach who treats everyone equally and brings out the best in them".

WWE Wrestler Batista has credited Finlay as "the unsung hero who changed the direction of his career" and personally requested Finlay to induct him in the Hall of Fame ceremony. Former WWE wrestler and trainer Lance Storm and former AEW wrestler/executive and current WWE wrestler Cody Rhodes have also praised Finlay's mentoring skills and for putting new talents over.

== Other media ==
=== Video games ===
Year	Title	Gimmick	Notes
1998	WCW/nWo Revenge	Fit Finlay	Video game debut
1999	WCW/nWo Thunder	Fit Finlay	
1999	WCW Nitro	Fit Finlay	Last WCW video game
2006	WWE SmackDown vs. Raw 2007	Finlay	First WWE video game
2007	WWE SmackDown vs. Raw 2008	Finlay	
2008	WWE SmackDown vs. Raw 2009	Finlay	
2009	WWE SmackDown vs. Raw 2010	Finlay	
2010	WWE SmackDown vs. Raw 2011	Finlay	
2014	WWE SuperCard	Fit Finlay	Mobile game
2014	WWE 2K15	Fit Finlay	Downloadable content (DLC)
2015	WWE 2K16	Fit Finlay	Last video game appearance

== Personal life ==
Finlay was previously married to his former manager, Paula "Princess Paula" Valdez. He is currently married to Melanie "Mel" Duffin and has three children, the eldest of whom, David, was born in Germany.

His children have been involved in wrestling, either at the amateur or professional level. His eldest son, David, is currently wrestling for All Elite Wrestling and is a former and final leader of Bullet Club. His daughter, Alanna, won the Georgia state championship during her youth. His youngest son, Brogan, trained for a brief time at the New Japan Pro-Wrestling dojo before the COVID-19 pandemic, and was signed to WWE in December 2023, where he currently performs under the ring name Uriah Connors.

== Championships and accomplishments ==
- All Star Wrestling
  - British Heavyweight Championship (1 time)
- Catch Wrestling Association
  - CWA British Commonwealth Championship (1 time)
  - CWA Intercontinental Heavyweight Championship (1 time)
  - CWA World Middleweight Championship (4 times)
  - CWA World Tag Team Championship (1 time) – with Marty Jones
- Fighting Spirit Magazine
  - LL Cool J Award (2006)
- Joint Promotions
  - World Mid-Heavyweight Championship (4 times)
  - British Heavy Middleweight Championship (6 times)
  - British Light Heavyweight Championship (2 times)
  - World of Sport Top Tag Team Tournament 1982 (with Skull Murphy (Peter Northey) as the Riot Squad.)
- Pro Wrestling Illustrated
  - Ranked No. 33 of the top 500 singles wrestlers in the PWI 500 in 2007
  - Ranked No. 278 of the top 500 singles wrestlers of the "PWI Years" in 2003
- Smash
  - Smash Championship (1 time, final)
- World Championship Wrestling
  - WCW Hardcore Championship (1 time, inaugural) (Note: Finlay won the Junkyard Invitational to become the inaugural WCW Hardcore Champion, initially represented by a trophy. Although he defended the title at least once, one month after winning it, WCW President Eric Bischoff vacated the title due to a leg injury sustained by Finlay. Finlay’s reign was not recognized in the title's history by WCW, but after WWF purchased WCW in 2001, WWF did indeed recognize the reign.)
  - WCW World Television Championship (1 time)
  - Hardcore Junkyard Invitational Tournament (1999)
- World Wrestling Entertainment
  - WWE United States Championship (1 time)
  - Bragging Rights Trophy (2009) – with Team SmackDown (Chris Jericho, Kane, R-Truth, Matt Hardy, David Hart Smith and Tyson Kidd)
