= Reg Gutteridge =

British boxing journalist & TV commentator (1924–2009)

Reginald George Gutteridge
- Born: 29 March 1924; Islington, London, England
- Died: 24 January 2009 (aged 84); Barnet, London, England
- Occupations: Sports journalist TV commentator
- Relatives: Jackie Pallo (cousin)
- Awards: Officer of the Order of the British Empire
- Military career
- Allegiance: United Kingdom
- Branch: British Army
- Service years: 1942–1944
- Unit: King's Royal Rifle Corps
- Conflicts: World War II; Invasion of Normandy

Reginald George Gutteridge, OBE (29 March 1924 – 24 January 2009) was a British boxing journalist and television commentator.

Gutteridge was born into a boxing family in Islington, London. His grandfather, Arthur, was the first professional boxer to appear at the original National Sporting Club. His father and uncle (Dick and Jack, the Gutteridge Twins) were recognised as the premier cornermen and trainers in Britain throughout the 1920s and 1930s. Gutteridge was an amateur flyweight boxer when he was conscripted as a foot soldier with the King's Royal Rifle Corps in 1942. During the Invasion of Normandy two years later, Gutteridge jumped from a tank and landed on a mine. This cost him his left leg and dreams of becoming a boxing champion. However, the incident provided him with the opportunity for some entertainment: for instance, during one holiday in Italy, he went to the beach at San Remo. He went for a swim and hopped out on one leg shouting "Shark, shark!", having hidden his prosthetic limb under a towel.

After World War II, Gutteridge became a journalist and reported on boxing for the London Evening News for more than 30 years. He became better known as the voice of ITV's boxing coverage, a job he performed from 1962 until 1998. During this time he formed a long-lasting commentating partnership with former world lightweight champion Jim Watt, which continued on Sky Sports during the 1990s, while ITV had reduced coverage of the sport. He also commentated for Talksport radio during the 1990s.

His awards as a commentator included the Sam Taub Award for Excellence in Broadcast Journalism and Presenter of the Year. He covered six Olympiads and commentated on sports as diverse as greyhound racing and tug o' war while working on the Saturday show World of Sport.

One of his most bizarre experiences was to be summoned by Muhammad Ali to interview him in the corner during a world title defence. Gutteridge and Ali became friends, and when he was ill in a London hospital during the 1980s, he woke up to find Ali in prayer at his bedside, as recalled in his 1998 autobiography Uppercuts and Dazes for which Muhammad Ali provided the foreword.

He was the subject of This Is Your Life in 1994 when he was surprised by Michael Aspel at Thames Television's Teddington Studios.

He was married to childhood sweetheart Connie for nearly 60 years; they had two daughters (Susan and Sally-Ann) and four grandsons. He was a first cousin of Jackie Pallo, the UK wrestler.

Gutteridge, an after-dinner speaker, often spoke of the former champion and 'unlucky' fighter David Pearce and his remarkable short successful boxing career. Pearce was rated number one by the WBC. He became an Officer of the Order of the British Empire in 1995. He was also an inductee of the International Boxing Hall of Fame and the World Boxing Hall of Fame.

Gutteridge died following a stroke on 24 January 2009, aged 84. Many sportswriter colleagues paid their respects to Gutteridge, a former chairman of the Sports Journalists' Association.
