= Alan Kilby =

British professional wrestler

Personal information
- Born: Sheffield, Yorkshire, England

Professional wrestling career
- Billed from: Sheffield, Yorkshire, England
- Debut: 1963

Alan Kilby is a professional wrestler from Sheffield, South Yorkshire. He was born in the 1940s and made his debut in the 1960s then went on to hold many British championships especially in the Mid-Heavyweight and Light-Heavyweight classes. He defended these championships on numerous occasions on national television on ITV's show World of Sport and these matches were publicised in listings magazine TVTimes. What made him particularly famous was that he is deaf although this would sometimes serve as a kayfabe problem as opponents would often use his disability against him. He is often accompanied by his translator/corner man.

== Professional wrestling career ==
In the 1980s, Kilby worked for Joint Promotions, where he feuded with Dave Finlay. After winning the British Heavy Middleweight Championship, he lost it to Finlay in June 1982. Subsequently, the two men traded the belt back and forth, each holding it several times. Later Kilby would hold the British Light Heavyweight Championship, claiming the belt as late as 2004.

After semi-retiring, he made sporadic appearances several times per year mostly tag team matches, making his last recent appearance on 21 January accepting a lifetime achievement award in his hometown from All-Star Promotions. On 11 October 2006 he teamed up with newcomer Hysteria to defeat fellow mat veteran Blondie Barrett and Jimmy Frost. On 30 September 2006 he teamed up with his son one more time to wrestle Norfolk brothers the UK Pitbulls in a losing effort.

Kilby made a special guest appearance at the Deaf Cultural Centre's wrestling show on 4 July 2009. He was presented an award and certificate for 'Lifetime Achievement' for his contribution to the sport of wrestling.

== Championships and accomplishments ==
- Joint Promotions
  - British Heavy Middleweight Championship (5 times)
  - British Light Heavyweight Championship (5 times)
- Revolution British Wrestling
  - RBW British Heavyweight Title Tournament
  - RBW British Heavyweight Championship (1 times)
