= Daniel Boyle =

Daniel Boyle may refer to:

- Daniel Boyle (politician) (1859–1925), Irish politician, MP for North Mayo
- Daniel Boyle (writer), Scottish screenwriter
- Dan Boyle (ice hockey) (born 1976), Canadian ice hockey player
- Dan Boyle (politician) (born 1962), Irish Green Party politician
- Danny Boyle (born 1956), British director and filmmaker

== See also ==
- Daniel Doyle (disambiguation)
- Danny Boy (disambiguation)
- Daniel (disambiguation)
- Boyle (disambiguation)
