= Wayne Bridges =

British wrestler (1936–2020)

Bridges

William Woodbridge (5 July 1936 – 8 March 2020) known professionally as Wayne Bridges was a British professional wrestler who was most well known for wrestling for Joint Promotions in the 1960s-80 and All Star Wrestling in the 1980s. He held the British wrestling version of the World Heavyweight Championship for most of the period 1979–1989, winning either of two branches of the title a total of three times. One of his championship wins, both of his championship defeats and several defences of his title were broadcast on ITV, on either standalone wrestling programmes or as part of the World of Sport package show. These bouts were publicised in the nationally distributed TVTimes magazine.

== Biography ==
Bridges started his career in wrestling in 1964. During his career, he became half of the NWA Vancouver Canadian Tag Team Champions with his tag team partner, Dan Kroffat. He was also an international wrestler travelling around the World. In 1979 he won the Mountevans Rules version of the World Heavyweight Wrestling title by defeating "Iron Greek" Spiros Arion at the Royal Albert Hall, London. Bridges lost the title to Mighty John Quinn in a match televised on ITV on FA Cup Final day 1980. Bridges teamed with Big Daddy to defeat Quinn and Yasu Fuji in the main event at Wembley Arena in 1980. (Previously circa 1974, Bridges and Daddy, then billed as "Battling Guardsman" Crabtree, had teamed together as a villain tag team.)

After Quinn defected to All Star and the BWF, Joint Promotions stripped him of the title and awarded it to Bridges for a win over "Mississippi Mauler" Big Jim Harris at Wembley Arena. Bridges was presented with a red/white/blue title belt which he defended during 1982 on television against challengers such as Pete Roberts, often drifting into villainous tactics to succeed. Quinn meanwhile continued to claim the title, represented by the original black title belt, until he lost his version to Tony St. Clair in Hanley in 1982. Bridges then defected to All Star and the BWF, confronting rival claimant St. Clair on S4C's Welsh-language wrestling TV show. After several inconclusive unification matches between the two, in 1984 Bridges reverted to blue-eye and defeated Quinn, who had regained his version from St. Clair, to unify the titles.

In early 1986 Bridges left All Star, taking his striped belt with him. Quinn won a four-man tournament on satellite TV channel Screensport to win the original black title belt. Several months later, Bridges returned to defeat Quinn and reunify the two versions of the title once more. A year later on 1 September, Bridges successfully defended the title in Croydon against Kendo Nagasaki when the challenger walked out. A rematch sixteen days later at a Bradford TV taping saw Nagasaki defeat Bridges for the title, becoming the first masked wrestler to hold a title in British wrestling. Nagasaki beat Bridges again in the contractually obligated return match 26 February 1988 in Worthing, but Bridges earned a second title match after defeating Baron Von Schultz (Judd Harris) at a Croydon TV taping and won back the title from Nagasaki by disqualification in Cheltenham. Bridges retired as champion in 1988.

In 2016 Wayne Bridges was inducted into the British Wrestlers Reunion Hall of Fame at the 25th Annual Reunion receiving the award from Roy St Clair. His wife Sarah Bridges was the final ever inductee into the Hall of Fame (posthumously) in January 2022 shortly before the Reunion ended after thirty years.

== After wrestling ==
In retirement he became the host of the British Wrestlers Reunion, a role he held for 25 years until his death. Bridges' wife Sarah was a professional bodybuilder and competed around the world, winning many titles before retiring and becoming a judge, most notably of the Arnold Classic in the USA. Sarah Bridges died on 22 November 2021 aged 53. Wayne Bridges died on 8 March 2020 at the age of 83.

== Links ==
http://www.britishwrestlersreunion.com

http://www.wrestlingheritage.co.uk
