= Danny Boy Collins =

English professional wrestler

Personal information
- Born: Daniel Collins; 21 February 1967 (age 59) Bristol, England, UK

Professional wrestling career
- Ring name(s): Danny "Boy" Collins; Danny Collins "Dirty" Dan Collins
- Billed height: 1.78 m (5 ft 10 in)
- Billed weight: 84 kg (185 lb; 13.2 st)
- Trained by: Roy Harley; Stan Osborne
- Debut: 23 September 1983

Daniel "Boy" Collins (born 21 February 1967) is an English professional wrestler. Noted for his agile, gymnastic style in the ring, he has toured successfully across Europe and Japan and held British, European and World (European version) titles in five different weight divisions.

Collins was a regular star of UK national broadcaster ITV's professional wrestling coverage (as well as S4C's Reslo wrestling programme) and his matches were publicised in national listings magazine TVTimes. He also received other media coverage including the BBC's Breakfast Time programme.

== Career ==
Collins made his professional debut in 1983 against Adrian Finch before going on to be a regular star of ITV's World of Sport programme. Despite losing his TV debut to veteran heel "Crybaby" Jim Breaks, Collins would come back in 1984 to defeat Breaks first in an elimination tournament final, then in a £500-per-fall challenge, before finally capturing Breaks' British Welterweight Title.

The following year, Collins would capture the European Welterweight Championship from visiting champion Jorg Chenok (billed as Baron Von Chenok) in a match screened on ITV during World Of Sport's special 1985 FA Cup Final edition. As a result of this victory, Danny would tour France and northern Spain extensively during the late 1980s for local promoter Roger Delaporte and his FFCP promotion. Collins was also a frequent tag team partner of Big Daddy as well as teaming with his younger brother Pete Collins.

He continued to have a successful wrestling career in the United Kingdom and across Europe despite an operation to have his kidney removed in the mid-1980s, using a high-flying style in his matches that was unusual for British wrestling at the time. He further developed the cartwheel escape from an arm lever previously used by Dynamite Kid in the mid-1970s - itself an advance on the traditional roll on the mat to untwist an arm lever.

After ITV's coverage of wrestling ended in 1988, he achieved even greater success, moving to All Star Wrestling, where he defeated Dave "Fit" Finlay to win the British Heavy-Middleweight Championship in 1989. Although he controversially lost the title by disqualification to Richie Brooks in Croydon in 1990, he would soon regain the belt that same year. In 1991, he defeated Owen Hart for the vacant World Middleweight Championship and would continue to claim the title until 1995 when he moved still further up the weights.

In April to May 1991, Collins toured the UK with the World Wrestling Federation. A year later he returned to work for the WWF in a dark match at London Arena for the UK Rampage card, Collins lost to Alan Kilby.

In March 1994 in Hove, Collins won the European Middleweight Championship from Mal Sanders and consequently had to vacate his European Welterweight Championship which Sanders then won. After losing the Welterweight title to Kashmir Singh, Sanders regained the Middleweight title from Collins in August 1995.

Around 1994, Collins became a heel after a (kayfabe) falling out with Robbie Brookside and Doc Dean. Rebranded 'Dirty' Dan Collins, in 1996, he defeated Alan Kilby to become British Light-Heavyweight Champion, but lost the title back to Kilby in 1997. He also teamed with fellow heel Drew McDonald, particularly for Otto Wanz's CWA in Germany and Austria. By the end of the 1990s, he had reverted to being a blue eye but his brother Peter was still a devout heel, known by then as 'Mr Vain' Pete Collins. This led to a lengthy feud between the two.

In 1996, Collins won the British Commonwealth Junior Heavyweight Championship while working in Japan for Michinoku Pro. He made two tours with the Japanese promotion and worked with the likes of Great Sasuke, Dick Togo, Gran Hamada, Tiger Mask and Funaki.

Collins' career slowed down to near-inactivity around 2000 due to accumulated back injuries, but he still appears sporadically on the British wrestling scene. In 2007, he launched a major comeback tour with All Star Wrestling, frequently working as a tag team with Dean Allmark. In October 2008 he lost to Germany's Christian "Ecki" Eckstein at GL1 Gloucester Leisure Centre.

Collins took part in Wrestling Rampage 2012 at GL1 Gloucester Leisure Centre on 4 February. He teamed up with Matt Jarrett to face Skull Murphy (Peter Northey) and 'Blondie' Bob Barrett.

As of 2012, Collins became a regular trainer at the WAW Academy in Norwich and a regular member of the roster for WAW as a heel allied with The Midas Stable. In March 2012 he won the WAW World Heavyweight Championship.

On 24 March 2013 Danny "Boy" Collins made his first appearance for Best of British Wrestling at their Ipswich Invasion show where he defeated ex ECW & Current Ring of Honor star Steve Corino 2 Falls to 1.

Collins wrestled what was billed as his last match on British soil on 10 October 2013 at GL1 Gloucester Leisure Centre for Superstars of Wrestling. He made his retirement match in Germany for European Wrestling Promotion as he wrestled in the main event against Lance Storm. Two months later, Collins returned to in ring competition.

Throughout 2014, Collins owned and operated his own wrestling school in Sutterton, Lincolnshire.

Throughout 2015, Collins worked regularly across England for HEW, WAW and All Star.

In 1 September 2017 Collins worked for the American promotion Chikara in their King of Trios event which took place in Wolverhampton.

In February 2018 Collins faced American star Chris Silvio at Cheltenham Town Hall for World Pro Wrestling.

Following the death in 2023 of All Star proprietor Brian Dixon - bequeathing the company to his grandson Joseph - Collins, alongside Laetitia Dixon (daughter of Brian, mother of Joseph) took over the elder Dixon's final office based duties in the company while the younger Dixon continued in the road management duties he had taken up in 2022.
