= Daniel Montgomery Boyd =

American industrialist

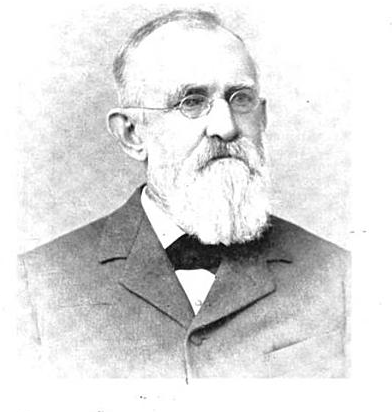
- Daniel Montgomery Boyd
- Born: April 23, 1826; Rush Township, Pennsylvania, U.S.
- Died: July 4, 1899 (aged 73)
- Education: Danville Academy
- Occupation: industrialist
- Spouse(s): Caroline A. Bockius (from 1869–1878); Ida Cottrell (from 1878–18??)
- Children: Daniel Montgomery Boyd, Elsie M. Boyd
- Parent(s): John C. Boyd, Hannah (Montgomery) Boyd

Daniel Montgomery Boyd (April 23, 1826 – July 4, 1899) was an American industrialist. He was educated at the Danville Academy and became involved in the coal industry at Pottsville within one or two years after graduating. From 1862 to 1881, he was involved in running a line of vessels at Havre De Grace shipping coal to the south and west. However, in 1881 he returned to Danville due to poor health and became involved in a number of local industries. He also was on the Board of Trustees of the Danville State Hospital beginning in 1883 and was its president beginning in 1886.

== Early life ==
Boyd was born on April 23, 1826, on a homestead in Rush Township, in Northumberland County, Pennsylvania, 2 miles (3.2 km) from Danville. He was born to John C. Boyd (from Chester County) and Hannah (Montgomery) Boyd (daughter of General Daniel Montgomery), who married in 1820. Both of his parents were of Scotch-Irish descent. The Boyd family came to America from Ireland in the early 1700s. Daniel Montgomery Boyd was named after his maternal grandfather, who was also the namesake of Danville, and was the second of seven children.

Boyd's education came mostly from Danville Academy, which was founded by his great-grandfather. After graduating, Boyd spent one or two years at his home in the countryside.

== Career ==
One or two years after graduating from the Danville Academy, Boyd relocated to Pottsville to get involved in the coal industry, where, according to J.H. Beers' 1915 Historical and Biographical Annals of Columbia and Montour Counties, Pennsylvania, he exhibited a "capacity for organization". He was involved in the opening and development of many mines in the Shamokin Coal Basin and, with his business partner, was one of the first to introduce improved coal breakers to the area. He also constructed railroads and worked as a relatively prominent mine operator. In 1850, he was one of the initial stockholders for Trevorton, Mahanoy, and Susquehanna Railroad.

In 1862, Boyd went to Havre de Grace, Maryland, to establish a line of vessels to ship coal to the south and west. His company was known as Hilles, Boyd & Company. The operation proved to be highly lucrative. However, in 1881, he retired from this work due to poor health and returned to Danville.

In Danville, once Boyd's health recovered, he became involved in a number of the borough's industries, becoming president of the First National Bank and the Danville Nail Company. He also became part of the Board of Trustees of the Danville State Hospital in July 1883. In October 1886, he became president of the Board of Trustees. He remained with the board until declining health forced him to resign.

== Personal life, death, and legacy ==
Boyd married twice during his lifetime. His first wife was Caroline A. Bockius, daughter of Samuel Blockius of Germantown; they married in 1869. After her death in 1878, Boyd married Ida Cottrell, daughter of Joseph W. Cottrell of Columbia. This union produced two children: Daniel Montgomery and Elsie M.

Boyd and his family were all members of the Presbyterian Church, and Boyd was a trustee of the church. He was a Republican throughout his entire life. Boyd built a house in Queen Anne style at 5 Bloom Street in Danville in the 1880s. He was living in this house as late as 1899, the year of his death.

Boyd suffered from a serious attack of influenza in the winter of 1897/1898 and his health never fully recovered. He died on July 4, 1899, at the age of 73.

According to J.H. Beers' Historical and Biographical Annals of Columbia and Montour Counties, Pennsylvania, Boyd was "one of the men to whom Montour County owes a debt of gratitude for his share in its development and prosperity". He provided aid in getting many of Danville's industries to a financially stable state and contributed to the social and business development of Danville. An 1899 book described him as a "liberal supporter financially of all worthy enterprises".
