= Broadsword calling Danny Boy =

Broadsword calling Danny Boy may refer to:

- A notable phrase spoken by Richard Burton from the film Where Eagles Dare
- A 2006 song by Tomcraft featuring Jimmy Pop
- A 2018 book by Geoff Dyer about the film
- Used as a callsign in "Doctor Who" Season 5 Episode 3 "Victory of the Daleks"

== See also ==
- Broadsword
- Danny Boy
