= Marty Jones =

British professional wrestler

Personal information
- Born: 13 December 1954 (age 71) Oldham, England

Professional wrestling career
- Ring name: Marty Jones
- Trained by: Billy Robinson; Ted Betley
- Debut: 1972
- Retired: 2003

Marty Jones (born 13 December 1954) is an English retired professional wrestler best known for his work in Joint Promotions and All Star Wrestling throughout the 1980s and 1990s. During this period, he was the predominant holder of the Mountevans World Mid Heavyweight title. Jones was also responsible for training William Regal.

== Professional wrestling career ==
Jones was trained by Ted Betley and Billy Robinson. The 1967 Granada Television documentary The Wrestlers contains footage of a young Jones, along with other students, being trained by Robinson.

Jones made his wrestling debut in 1972 as an 17-year-old. He won his first singles championship on 12 November 1976 when he defeated "Rollerball" Mark Rocco for the British Light Heavyweight Championship (left vacant following the retirement that year of Billy Joyce). This was to be the start of a long and heated feud with Rocco, whom Jones also defeated for his British Heavy-Middleweight title only to immediately vacate the belt due to already holding a heavier British title. Jones also held the British Commonwealth tag team titles with a young Steve Wright in the late-1970s.

On 8 November 1982 he defeated Bobby Gaetano for the World Mid-Heavyweight Championship left vacant by the death of Mike Marino the previous year. His semifinal opponent in the tournament was a young Bret Hart. As a result of this win, Jones vacated his British Light Heavyweight title after six years as undefeated champion. Jones would go on to win this title several times trading it back and forth with Dave "Fit" Finlay on several occasions. He also lost the title to Wright who was billed as being "Bull Blitzer" from Germany (kayfabe) However when "Blitzer" failed to grant Jones a contractual return title match, he was stripped of the title and Jones defeated Owen Hart for the vacant title on ITV in 1987.. His last televised defence before ITV cancelled its wrestling coverage in 1988 was that summer against visiting French star Marc Mercier.. Jones himself wrestled on French TV that same year on TF1's New Catch show, defeating Judd Harris. The series was repeated on Eurosport in 1991.

During the early 1980s Jones also wrestled for New Japan Pro-Wrestling. He faced Tiger Mask on 8 October 1982 and also participated in two tag team matches alongside well-known international names in early 1983. In one Jones teamed with The Masked Superstar against Antonio Inoki and Tatsumi Fujinami and the other saw him team with Rusher Kimura against Hulk Hogan and Inoki. Jones also partnered with André the Giant in a further bout.

Jones also wrestled in Germany for one of the biggest companies in Europe at the time, the Catch Wrestling Association. He teamed with his old in-ring foe Finlay to win the CWA World Tag Team Championship from Tony St. Clair and Mile Zrno on 23 June 1990.

In All Star Wrestling, Jones became a heel in 1992, adjusting his philosophy after an accidental British reunion of his CWA tag team partnership with Finlay at a Fairfield Halls, Croydon show proved unexpectedly successful. He defeated Tony St Clair for the British Heavyweight Championship in 1996. Also in 1996, Jones teamed up with Peter Collins on 1 February to defeat the "Liverpool Lads" (Rob Brookside and "Doc" Dean) for the vacant British Open Tag Team Championship before retiring later that year. He later returned to finally lose his World Mid Heavyweight title to "Legend of Doom" Johnny South on 27 May 1999 in Bristol. In 2000, reverting to blue-eye, he feuded with masked wrestler Kendo Nagasaki due to his dissatisfaction with the latter winning a "Wrestler of the Millennium" trophy which Jones felt he should have won.

Jones was featured heavily in Ray Robinson's autobiography, The Sheriff, released in 2013.

Jones made a special guest appearance at GL1 Gloucester Leisure Centre October 2013 and in Dundee for Scottish Wrestling Entertainment on 29 and 30 November.

Jones is a trainer at Leeds-based Grapple Wrestling, and a trainer at The Squared Circle Academy, based in Royton, Oldham. As a trainer he has been responsible for training Luke Menzies and mentored multiple members of the NXT UK roster along with scores of other UK and international talents. Jones regularly makes appearances at the Skegness based promotion, Lion Wrestling Promotions.

On 24 August 2025, Jones made an appearance for All Elite Wrestling (AEW) as part of their Forbidden Door event at the O2 Arena in London, England. The event was co-promoted with New Japan Pro Wrestling so it marked Jones' first appearance at a New Japan event since the early 1980's. Both Jones and fellow retired British wrestler Johnny Saint appeared at ringside during the IWGP World Heavyweight Championship match between Nigel McGuinness and Zack Sabre Jr. After the event, Jones praised both competitors in a post on AEW's Instagram.

== Championships and accomplishments ==
- All Star Wrestling

- British Heavyweight Championship (1 time)
- British Open Tag Team Championship (1 time) – with Danny Collins

- Catch Wrestling Association

- CWA World Tag Team Championship (1 time) – with Fit Finlay

- Joint Promotions

- World Mid-Heavyweight Championship (7 times)
- British Light Heavyweight Championship (5 times)
