= Dean Allmark =

English professional wrestler

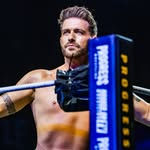

Personal information
- Born: 25 August 1983 (age 42) Stoke-on-Trent, England

Professional wrestling career
- Ring name(s): Dean 2 Xtreme; Dean Allmark; Deano; Too Extreme Dean; Xtreme Dean
- Billed height: 178 cm (5 ft 10 in)
- Billed weight: 82 kg (181 lb)
- Trained by: Chris Curtis; GBH Wrestling School; Keith Myatt
- Debut: 22 January 2000
- Retired: 25 January 2025

Dean Allmark (born 25 August 1983) is an English professional wrestling trainer and active professional wrestler. He has worked for promotions including All Star Wrestling (ASW), Total Nonstop Action Wrestling (TNA), Pro Wrestling Live (PWL), Progress Wrestling, TNT Extreme Wrestling and Revolution Pro Wrestling (Revpro). He often goes by the nicknames "Xtreme" or "2-Xtreme" and was one half of the UK Dream Team with Kid Cool.

== Early life ==
Allmark was born in Stoke-on-Trent on 25 August 1983.

== Career ==
Allmark began his wrestling career in the Stoke-based wrestling promotion Great British Hardcore (GBH) in 1999, where he was trained in its school by Keith Myatt and Chris Curtis. He had his first professional match in January 2000 at Longton WMC against Chris Curtis. During his time in GBH, he won the British tag team titles twice, once with fellow trainee Timm Wiley and once with Robbie Dynamite. After this, he moved to Birkenhead to join his future father-in-law Brian Dixon's promotion All Star Wrestling. In 2001, he became part of All Star's roster and found new tag team partners with Robbie Dynamite and Kid Cool. Teaming with Kid Cool became a lasting partnership as the pair became known as the UK Dream Team. Dynamite's partnership with Allmark was less successful, with both men beginning a long-standing personal feud.

On 7 April 2004, Allmark made his biggest appearance outside the UK when he was chosen to be a part of Team Britain during Total Nonstop Action Wrestling's America's X-Cup. During the PPV from Nashville, Tennessee, Allmark failed to win his singles match against Team Mexico's Mr. Águila but picked up a win in a tag match against Heavy Metal and Abismo Negro when Allmark's tag partner James Mason made one of the opponents submit. Team Mexico eventually won America's X-Cup. Back in England on 7 June 2005, the UK Dream Team defeated The Chippendales (Mikey Whiplash and Johnny Midnight) and became recognised by All Star Promotions as the British Tag Team Champions. Allmark went on to renew his feud with Dynamite, and things came to a head months later when Allmark defeated Dynamite in January 2006 for his All Star British Mid-Heavyweight title, making Allmark a double champion in the promotion. Dynamite and Whiplash defeated the UK Dream Team on 25 February 2006 to win the British Tag Team Championship; Allmark was hospitalised after the match with an injury to the head that needed nine stitches. He tried to return to action a month later, but the wound reopened and he returned to hospital for more treatment.

Allmark and Dynamite were scheduled to face each other in a no-holds-barred match in Hanley on 18 March. However, the match never took place as Allmark received news a few hours before the event that his 18-month-old son was ill. The two rivals repeatedly met in matches throughout the rest of 2006, many of which were for Allmark's Mid-Heavyweight title. Dynamite finally defeated Allmark for the title in 2007. On 1 September 2010, Allmark wrestled for Dragon Gate Pro Wrestling, where he defeated Stixx. On 10 July 2010, he wrestled for IPW:UK's Summer Sizzler to compete in the quarter-final of the IPW:UK Cruiserweight Championship Tournament. He went on to defeat Max Angleus to make it to the semifinals of the tournament. On 3 December 2011, he made his debut for Preston City Wrestling, taking on Dave Mastiff. This show also featured Desmond Wolfe's return to a UK ring.

Allmark next appeared for PCW on 24 February, taking part in a 4-way cruiserweight match against Noam Dar, Joey Hayes, and Zack Sabre Jr. On 20 February 2013, he won a rumble match; his reward was to choose a partner on 10 April 2013 to face Robbie Dynamite and Rampage Brown in the first ever cage match in Gravesend, which they won. Through ASW's relationship with Japanese promotion Wrestle-1, Allmark made his debut for Wrestle-1 on 6 July 2014, losing the British Light Heavyweight Championship to Seiki Yoshioka. He regained the title from Yoshioka back in the UK on 19 August. On 19 December 2021, after a brief time away from wrestling, he had a 30-minute two falls to finish against Mad Dog Maxx at Pro Wrestling Live. Neither wrestler could get the second pinfall, but agreed to later have a rematch.

Allmark semi-retired following his 25th anniversary show on 25 January 2025, and has since focused on training new wrestlers at his C.L.A.W. (Come Learn About Wrestling) school in Liverpool; although he did not establish the school until 2020, he has a long record as a wrestling trainer, being the head trainer at All Star Wrestling's school from 2006 to 2023. His former students include Toni Storm, who has called him one of her biggest influences and credited him with her success, and Xia Brookside. During his career, he received press coverage in the Chester Standard, East Anglian Daily Times, and Sutton & Croydon Guardian.

== Personal life ==
Allmark resides in Cheshire. He was married to Letitia Dixon, the daughter of All Star Wrestling (ASW) founder Brian Dixon, until their divorce in January 2022. They have two children together. In July 2022, their son Joseph (who worked in the industry as a referee) took over ASW's road managerial duties from his grandfather, who continued running the company from its Birkenhead office. Following Brian Dixon's death on 27 May 2023, Joseph became owner of the company and continued overseeing its road managerial aspects whilst office duties were taken up by Letitia and Danny Collins.
