= British Light Heavyweight Championship =

Professional wrestling championship

Details
- Promotion: World of Sport; All Star Wrestling
- Date established: 1920s
- Current champion: Dean Allmark
- Date won: 19 August 2014
Statistics
- First champion: Sam Clapham

The British Light Heavyweight Championship was a top British wrestling championship found throughout the country's circuit. The title's broken history dates back to the 1920s. After going inactive in 2004, the title was re-activated in 2014.

The championship was recognised and defended on matches screened by UK national television network ITV as part of the professional wrestling slot on World of Sport as well as standalone broadcasts. Pre-publicity for these championship match broadcasts was given in ITV's nationally published listings magazine TVTimes.

== Title history ==
This is the combined list of different versions of the British Heavyweight Titles, each of which was probably the most significant version at the time. Each version may or may not be connected to another. However, all title changes are either actual or "official" unless indicated otherwise.

=== Original ===
Key
No.	Overall reign number
Reign	Reign number for the specific champion
Days	Number of days held

No.	Champion	Championship change			Reign statistics		Notes	Ref.
No.	Champion	Date	Event	Location	Reign	Days	Notes	Ref.
1	Sam Clapham	1920s	House show	N/A	1	N/A	First recorded champion.	
2	Atholl Oakeley	1930	House show	N/A	1	N/A	Legacy from Clapham uncertain	
3	Dick Wills	1932	House show	N/A	1	N/A		
4	Robert H Cook	1936-1938	House show	Manchester	1	N/A	Won title from Wills 08/05/1936. Won European Light Heavyweight title from Milo Popocopolis 22/05/1936.	
5	Bill McDonald	1947	House show	N/A	1	N/A	Legacy from Cook uncertain	
6	Charley Fisher	June 1950	House show	N/A	1	N/A		
7	Sonny Wallis	July 1950	House show	N/A	1	N/A	Vacated title	
8	Norman Walsh	February 1951	House show	Edinburgh	1	N/A	Defeated Tony Baer to win the title.	
9	Les Kellett	N/A	House show	N/A	1	N/A		

Key
No.	Overall reign number
Reign	Reign number for the specific champion
Days	Number of days held

No.	Champion	Championship change			Reign statistics		Notes	Ref.
No.	Champion	Date	Event	Location	Reign	Days	Notes	Ref.
1	Dennis Mitchell	1952	House show	N/A	1	N/A		
2	Ernie Riley	1952	House show	N/A	1	N/A	Defeated "Iron Man" Steve Logan to win the title.	
3	Charley Fisher	N/A	House show	N/A	2	N/A	Legacy from Riley uncertain. Vacated the title in 1955 after leaving the Light Heavyweight division.	
4	Ernie Riley	1955	House show	N/A	2	N/A	Defeated "Iron Man" Steve Logan to win the title.	
5	Billy Joyce	1957	House show	N/A	1	N/A		
6	Ernie Riley	N/A	House show	N/A	3	N/A		
7	Roy St. Clair	1960	House show	Nottingham	1	N/A		
8	Ernie Riley	May 1961	House show	N/A	4	N/A	Riley retired as champion in December 1969.	
9	Billy Joyce	27 March 1971	House show	Blackburn	2	2,057	Defeated Tony Charles for the vacant title. Retired as champion in 1976.	
10	Marty Jones	12 November 1976	House show	Wolverhampton	1	N/A	Defeated Mark Rocco for the vacant title. Jones vacates the title in 1982 after winning the World Mid-Heavyweight Championship.	
11	Dave Finlay	24 February 1983	House show	Oldham	1	275	Defeated Ringo Rigby in a tournament final	
12	Marty Jones	26 November 1983	House show	Manchester	2	N/A		
13	Dave Finlay	February 1984 {NLT)	House show	N/A	2	N/A		
14	Marty Jones	8 February 1984	House show	Leamington	3	343	Jones vacated the title in 1984 after regaining the World Mid-Heavyweight Championship.	
15	Alan Kilby	16 January 1985	House show	Walsall	1	N/A	Defeated Steve Logan (Note: unrelated to the Steve Logan listed above) to win the vacant title.	

=== All Star Wrestling/ WAW/ RBW ===
Key
No.	Overall reign number
Reign	Reign number for the specific champion
Days	Number of days held

No.	Champion	Championship change			Reign statistics		Notes	Ref.
No.	Champion	Date	Event	Location	Reign	Days	Notes	Ref.
1	King Ben	25 March 1988	House show	Keighley	1	N/A		
2	Alan Kilby	1988	House show	N/A	2	N/A		
3	Skull Murphy (Peter Northey)	N/A	House show	Norwich	1	N/A		
4	Alan Kilby	September 1995 (NLT)	House show	N/A	3	N/A		
5	Danny Boy Collins	2 April 1996	House show	Croydon	1	N/A		
6	Alan Kilby	January 1998 (NLT)	House show	N/A	4	N/A		
7	Ian Wilson	10 October 1998	House show	Norwich	1	N/A	This and the next title change may have been on WAW house shows.	
8	Alan Kilby	November 1998	House show	Norwich	5	N/A	Last claimed the title on 1 November 2004. Wore belt to RBW shows in 2003.	
9	Dean Allmark	2014	House show	N/A	1	N/A	Title reactivated by All Star	
10	Seiki Yoshioka	6 July 2014	House show	Tokyo, Japan	1	44		
11	Dean Allmark	19 August 2014	House show	Rhyl	2	4,095+		

== See also ==
- Professional wrestling in the United Kingdom
