= All Star Wrestling =

British professional wrestling promotion

- Acronym: ASW
- Founded: October 1970
- Style: British wrestling (Mountevans rules)
- Headquarters: Birkenhead, England
- Founder: Brian Dixon
- Owner: Joseph Dixon
- Formerly: All Star Promotions; Big Time Wrestling; Super Slam Wrestling; Wrestling Enterprises of Birkenhead
- Website: linktr.ee/allstarwrestlinguk

All Star Wrestling (ASW), also known as Super Slam Wrestling (SSW), is a British professional wrestling promotion founded by Brian Dixon in 1970 and based in Birkenhead, England. Founded as Wrestling Enterprises of Birkenhead in October 1970, it has also been known over the years as All Star Promotions and Big Time Wrestling. ASW tours theatres, leisure centres, town halls, holiday camps, and similar venues, many of which are the same locations that were used for televised wrestling in the UK from the 1950s to the 1980s.

ASW is the oldest active wrestling promotion in the UK and the longest-running British promotion in history, a record it has held since September 2013 when it eclipsed the 42 years and 11 months tenure of Joint Promotions (1952–1995). It is also the fourth oldest professional wrestling promotion still in existence in the world, after the Mexican promotion CMLL (founded 1933), WWE (founded 1963) and longtime US independent ECWA (founded 1967).

ASW contributed to the final two years of ITV's regular televised wrestling programme in the UK in (1987 and 1988) and some ASW matches were included on VHS and DVD compilations and repeated as part of the World of Sport programming on The Fight Network until it stopped transmission in 2008. They were then repeated on the now defunct Men & Movies channel.

In July 2022, Dixon bequeathed all road management duties to his grandson Joseph Dixon (aka Joseph Allmark, the son of wrestler Dean Allmark), while continuing to lead the company in a purely office based capacity. The elder Dixon died 27 May 2023, leaving his grandson as sole proprietor. Brian Dixon's office duties were taken up by his daughter Laetitia Dixon and veteran wrestler Danny Collins.

== History ==
=== 1970s ===
Brian Dixon, a referee and former head of the Jim Breaks Fan Club, established Wrestling Enterprises in Birkenhead during October 1970 initially as a vehicle for his girlfriend (and later wife) Mitzi Mueller, who was the British Ladies' Champion but had difficulty getting bookings from Joint Promotions. One of the company's earliest claims to fame was rebranding the wrestler Martin Ruane, formerly known as Luke McMasters, as new character Giant Haystacks. Originally called "Haystacks Calhoun", he was patterned after the similar American wrestler of the same name, about whom Dixon had read in imported American wrestling magazines. Haystacks would go on to achieve household fame in the UK after he moved to Joint Promotions in 1975 as the tag team partner – and later the archenemy – of Big Daddy.

During the late 1970s, Wrestling Enterprises held regular major shows at the Liverpool Stadium and organised a version of the World Middleweight Title after the previous version became extinct with the collapse of the Spanish wrestling scene c. 1975. This title continued until champion Adrian Street emigrated to America in 1981. Wrestling Enterprises also collaborated heavily with another independent promoter, former middleweight star Jackie Pallo. Neither promoter was able to gain a slice of ITV coverage however, as the 1981 contract renewal negotiations resulted in a five-year extension on Joint Promotions' exclusive monopoly of ITV wrestling.

=== 1980s ===
By the early 1980s there was increasing dissatisfaction among both adult fans and wrestlers with the direction of Joint Promotions (which was increasingly centred on Big Daddy), which resulted in a steady flow of top UK talent into All Star Wrestling (as it was by then renamed) and away from Joint and the TV spotlight. Title-holders such as World Heavyweight Champion Mighty John Quinn, rival claimant Wayne Bridges, British Heavyweight Champion Tony St Clair, World Heavy-Middleweight Champion Mark Rocco, British Heavy-Middleweight Champion Frank 'Chic' Cullen and World Lightweight Champion Johnny Saint all defected to All Star taking their titles with them, as did many non-titleholders. By the mid-1980s All Star was running shows head-to-head with Joint Promotions and had its own TV show on satellite channel Screensport.

When Joint's five-year extension on its monopoly of ITV wrestling expired at the end of 1986, All Star, along with the WWF, was also given a share of the televised wrestling shows for the two years 1987–88. The beginning of this period coincided with the return to full-time action for legendary masked wrestler Kendo Nagasaki under the All Star banner. At the end of 1988, Greg Dyke cancelled wrestling on ITV after 33 years. Whereas Joint dwindled downward as a touring vehicle for Big Daddy (and later Davey Boy Smith) before finally folding in 1995, All Star had played its cards well with regard to its two years of TV exposure, using the time in particular to build up the returning Nagasaki as its lead heel and establishing such storylines as his tag team-cum-feud with Rollerball Rocco and his "hypnotism" of Robbie Brookside.

=== 1990s ===
The end of TV coverage left many of these storylines at a cliffhanger and consequently All Star underwent a box office boom as hardcore fans turned up to live shows to see what happened next, and kept coming for several years due to careful use of show-to-show storylines. Headline matches frequently pitted Nagasaki in violent heel vs heel battles against the likes of Rocco, Dave 'Fit' Finlay, Skull Murphy and even Giant Haystacks or at smaller venues teaming with regular partner "Blondie" Bob Barrett to usually defeat blue-eye opposition.

All Star's post-television boom wore off after 1993 when Nagasaki retired for a second time. However, the promotion kept afloat on live shows at certain established venues and particularly on the holiday camp circuit. Since the mid-1990s, the promotion has mainly been focussed on family entertainment. After the demise of Joint/RWS, All Star's chief rival on the live circuit was Scott Conway's TWA (The Wrestling Alliance) promotion, founded as the Southeastern Wrestling Alliance in 1989. By the late 1990s, many smaller British promoters were increasingly abandoning their British identity in favour of "WWF Tribute" shows, with British performers crudely imitating World Wrestling Federation stars.

=== 2000s ===
Although All Star never descended into a full-fledged 'tribute show', by the turn of the millennium, many of these tribute acts such as the "UK Undertaker" and "Big Red Machine" were nonetheless headlining All Star shows. Disaffected with this and other matters (such as the inclusion of former WWF World Champion Yokozuna on advertising posters over a year after he had died, the continued advertising of Davey Boy Smith months after his planned tour fell through and the use of a photo of the original WWF Kane to depict the tribute performer "Big Red Machine"), Conway cut his links with All Star and declared a promotional war. He began to promote his TWA as an alternative, featuring more serious wrestling (in much the same way as All Star had previously targeted Joint fans disaffected with Big Daddy). All Star duly adapted to meet the challenge, recruiting a new generation of wrestlers such as Dean Allmark and Robbie Dynamite and signing up such stars as "American Dragon" Bryan Danielson. The promotional war came to an abrupt end in 2003 when Conway relocated to Thailand, closing down the TWA (which he briefly tried to transplant to his new country as the "Thai Wrestling Alliance"). Conway returned to the UK 2021 planning to revive TWA, but ill health curtailed this and he died 20 April 2025.

During this period, All Star's touring schedule generally consisted of monthly residencies at the Fairfield Hall in Croydon, the Victoria Hall in Hanley and the Colston Hall in Bristol as well as one or two tour stops each year in various town centre venues and a summer season at various Butlins resorts. A major storyline during these years was a long running feud between former tag partners Allmark and Dynamite, mostly over the British Mid-Heavyweight Championship which the promotion revived in 2002, 21 years after the death of previous champion Mike Marino.

As the 2000s wore on, All Star reached new heights of activity not seen since the post-television boom of the early 1990s, reactivating many more old TV venues, and in the summer 2008 season revived the old tradition of wrestling shows at Blackpool Tower, with a Friday night residency there. All Star re-established old links with promoters in France, Germany, Japan and Calgary. All Star wrestlers were widely used to represent Britain by major American promoters, for example the Team UK in TNA's 2004 X Cup which featured four All Star Wrestling regulars James Mason, Dean Allmark, Robbie Dynamite and Frankie Sloan. Mason would also guest on WWE Smackdown in 2008, defeating MVP.

Old ASW logo.

=== 2010s / 2020s ===
On 24 April 2010, ASW joined the Union of European Wrestling Alliances and recognised the European Heavyweight Championship. They hosted two title changes with Mikey Whiplash defeating Rampage Brown and James Mason defeating Whiplash. ASW hosted several of Mason's title defences before leaving the UEWA on 30 November 2013.

In April 2014, ASW established a relationship with Japanese promotion Wrestle-1.

Throughout the 2010s, ASW would continue to bring in younger talent from popular UK promotions (Insane Championship Wrestling, Progress Wrestling, Revolution Pro Wrestling) as well as veterans and international talent, such as Zack Sabre Jr., Fit Finlay Junior, Dave Mastiff, Jack Gallagher, Noam Dar, Andy Wild, Kris Travis, Marty Scurll, Sweet Saraya, El Ligero, BT Gunn, Shinya Ishikawa, Harlem Bravado, Mark Haskins, Xia Brookside, Kay Lee Ray, Gangrel and Jay White.

The promotion runs a school in Birkenhead. Originally Allmark and Dynamite were chief trainers; Joel Redman replaced them in 2023. Redman also runs an affiliated wrestling school in Salisbury which promotes its own trainee shows, both of these operating under the banner "ASW South". Dixon's daughter Laetitia is a popular ring announcer for the promotion and was married to Allmark until January 2022. In July 2022 the company announced that their elder son, referee Joseph Allmark, would be taking over day-to-day operations on the road, while Dixon moved to a back seat role from the company's Birkenhead office until his death in 2023, at which point Joseph Allmark took over full control of the company. Since 2024 he has been known as Joseph Dixon.

== Championships ==
=== Current champions ===
Title	Current holder	Date won	Days	Location	Previous Champion
World Heavyweight Championship	Mickey Long	1 January 2025	609	N/A	Wayne Bridges (Long was previously British champion – he was upgraded to World champion)
British Heavyweight Championship	Tommy Freeman	1 January 2025	609	N/A	Previously recognised as champion by FCW. Recognised by ASW when Micky Long upgraded to World champion
British Mid-Heavyweight Championship	Robbie Dynamite	2 October 2009	6,179	Birkenhead, England	Dean Allmark
British Light Heavyweight Championship	Dean Allmark	19 August 2014	4,397	Rhyl, Wales	Seiki Yoshioka
World Heavy-Middleweight Championship	Mikey Whiplash	3 March 2009	6,392	Croydon, England	Thomas La Ruffa

=== Former championships ===
==== Mountevans Committee-established titles ====
The Mountevans committee was an independent committee which met in 1947 to establish a set of rules and championships for the British professional wrestling scene. The five current titles listed above were all first set up by the committee. All Star Wrestling hosted many other such championships in the past, some of which have since been moved to or revived by other promotions.

Title	Last All Star Champion	Date won	Location	Previous Champion	Subsequent History
British Heavy-Middleweight Championship	Danny Collins	4 September 1990	Croydon, England	Richie Brooks	Remained vacant since 1996 when Collins won the British Light Heavyweight Championship
British Welterweight Championship	Steve Prince	9 October 1993	Croydon, England	Doc Dean	Later recognised by TWA (2000–2003), RBW (2004–2006) and LDN (2007–2009). Last claimed by Alan Travis
British Lightweight Championship	Steve Grey	October 1993	unknown	Jimmy Ocean	Claimed by Grey until his retirement in 2021, at which point Nino Bryant won a tournament held by Rumble Promotions - he still holds the title as of 2026
European Heavyweight Championship	John Praytor	1995	–	–	Later organised by the UEWA
UEWA European Heavyweight Championship	James Mason	2 October 2010	5,814	Hanley, England	Held by Andy Roberts since 2019
European Middleweight Championship	Jason Cross	December 1995	-	Mal Sanders	Cross remains active (but not for All Star Wrestling)
European Welterweight Championship	Mal Sanders	September 1994	–	Kashmir Singh	Vacant when Sanders regains European Middleweight championship
British Empire/Commonwealth Heavyweight Championship	Count Bartelli	1981	Liverpool, England	Hans Streiger	Left vacant since Bartelli's retirement in 1986.
WWA World Heavyweight Championship	Wayne Bridges	28 March 1988	Cheltenham, England	Kendo Nagasaki	Left vacant following Bridges' retirement. Championship belt on display at Bridges' pub until his death in 2019.
World Mid-Heavyweight Championship	Johnny South	27 May 1999	Bristol, England	Marty Jones	Last claimed in the UK by South. Prince Zéfy is recognised as champion since 2005 by French promotion Wrestling Stars
World Middleweight Championship	Danny Collins	1 November 1991	Bath, England	Owen Hart	Vacated by Collins in 1995. Later organised by Rumble Promotions (1996) last claimed by Steve Grey who vacated title.
World Lightweight Championship	Johnny Saint	13 June 1993	Bristol, England	Steve Grey	Saint resigned as champion 2001, title has been vacant since.

==== Mountevans rules subsequently established titles ====
These championships were established at later dates (but prior to the 1990s) for fields of competition (tag teams, women's wrestling) not envisaged by the Mountevans Committee in 1948.

Title	Last All Star Champion	Date won	Location	Previous Champion	Subsequent History
British Open Tag Team Championship	Mikey Whiplash and Robbie Dynamite	25 February 2006	Staffordshire, England	Kid Cool and Dean Allmark	Title reactivated 2024 by Rumble Promotions.
British Women's Championship	Nicki Monroe	February 1992	Bournemouth, England	Klondyke Kate	Later organised by WAW

==== Other (non-Mountevans) titles formerly in All Star ====
The below list of various championships previously featured on All Star shows but not recognised under the UK's Mountevans Committee rules include company-only championships as well as titles from American promotions defended by visiting champions. As with the previous list, some of these remained active outside of All Star.

- TNA World Tag Team Championship

Defended on All Star shows by then-champions Doug Williams and Nick Aldis while on a UK homecoming tour in October 2009. Title still active, mostly in its promotion of origin.

- WCW World Television Championship

Brought to All Star briefly by Lord Steven Regal while on a World Tour in 1996, returned to home promotion subsequently. Abandoned by WCW in 2000.

- Pan Pacific World Heavyweight Championship

Claimed on All Star shows by Joe E Legend c. 2005–2007.

- All Star Peoples Championship

Title originally created by All Star in 2003.
