= Jackie Pallo =

English professional wrestler

Personal information
- Born: Jack Ernest Gutteridge; 12 January 1926 Islington, London, UK
- Died: 11 February 2006 (aged 80)

Professional wrestling career
- Billed height: 5 ft 6 in (1.68 m)
- Billed weight: 161 lb (73 kg; 11.5 st)
- Billed from: Highbury, North London
- Debut: 1951
- Retired: 1984

Jackie "Mr TV" Pallo (born Jack Ernest Gutteridge; 12 January 1926 – 11 February 2006) was an English professional wrestler, a star of British televised wrestling in its 1960s and 1970s heyday, when the sport had a regular 40-minute slot before the Saturday afternoon football results on ITV.

== Wrestling career ==
Gutteridge was born in Islington and had been a sports teacher. He became a wrestler and was billed from Highbury, North London and was regarded as one of the first stars of British professional wrestling. During his career, his most famous rivalry was an 11-year-long battle with perhaps the greatest villain in British wrestling history, Mick McManus. In 1973, Pallo made two unsuccessful attempts to beat McManus for the European Middleweight Championship.

Pallo was a risk-taking athlete on the one hand but pushed credibility to the limits at other times owing to his over-the-top cockiness. Fans rejoiced in his sit-on back breaker and arm lever, his aeroplane spin, and his cross-shoulder backbreaker. Pallo's star was further affirmed when a 1964 date in Bishop's Stortford sold out in only 3 hours. His sole major accolade during his career was a short 1969 run as the British Heavy Middleweight Champion, having defeated Bert Royal on 21 April before dropping the title back to Royal the following month. His feud with McManus was featured in the 2012 BBC documentary When Wrestling Was Golden: Grapples, Grunts and Grannies. He appeared on television during the Sixties so often he was known as "Mr TV" and, due to his tactics, also as "The man they love to hate". He retired from wrestling in 1975.

=== Promotion ===
After leaving Joint Promotions in 1975, Pallo set up his own independent wrestling promotion Pallo Enterprises, promoting himself as "The Star Who Presents the Stars". Later following the 1988 cancellation of wrestling on ITV, Pallo established another promotion, Wrestling Around the World, which produced TV broadcasts for some ITV regions.

=== Autobiography ===
Even before the publication of his 1985 autobiography "You Grunt, I'll Groan" (ISBN 0-7088-3228-8), where he revealed the secrets of the wrestling entertainment business (including referees carrying razor blades to nick fighters' earlobes in order to produce the necessary blood to satisfy the bloodlust of the frenzied crowd of mostly elderly women – Pallo preferred to bite his lip to produce the same effect) crowds argued about whether wrestling bouts were staged or not. "Of course it was, it was pure showbiz right from the start", Pallo wrote in his autobiography.

== Away from wrestling ==
Apart from wrestling, Pallo had a mainstream show business career – appearing in pantomime with celebrities such as Lionel Blair and Dick Emery. He had a small part in the 1973 film farce 'Not Now Darling' directed by Ray Cooney. He also appeared in an episode of Are You Being Served?, in which he wrestled John Inman, and The Avengers. Playing a gravedigger in The Avengers, he was accidentally knocked unconscious during a fight with Honor Blackman's judo champion character, Cathy Gale – striking his head as he fell into the grave. "I want it to be made perfectly clear that this was an accident ... I have never been beaten by a woman and never intend to be", Pallo said afterward. In the late 1950s as "Mr Gutteridge" he taught boxing at Arnold House School, a prep school in St John's Wood, North London.

== Personal life ==
Pallo lived with his family at Ozengell Farm in Ramsgate, Kent. Pallo died from cancer in 2006, aged 80, and was survived by his wife Georgina aka "Trixie" (died 2013) and his son Jackie Jr (born 1954; died 9 October 2018), himself a former wrestler and frequent tag team partner of Pallo under the team name Pallo and Son. The elder Pallo was a first cousin of TV sports commentator Reg Gutteridge.

== Championships and accomplishments ==
- Joint Promotions
  - British Heavy Middleweight Championship (1 time)
