= Ricky Knight Jr. =

British professional wrestler

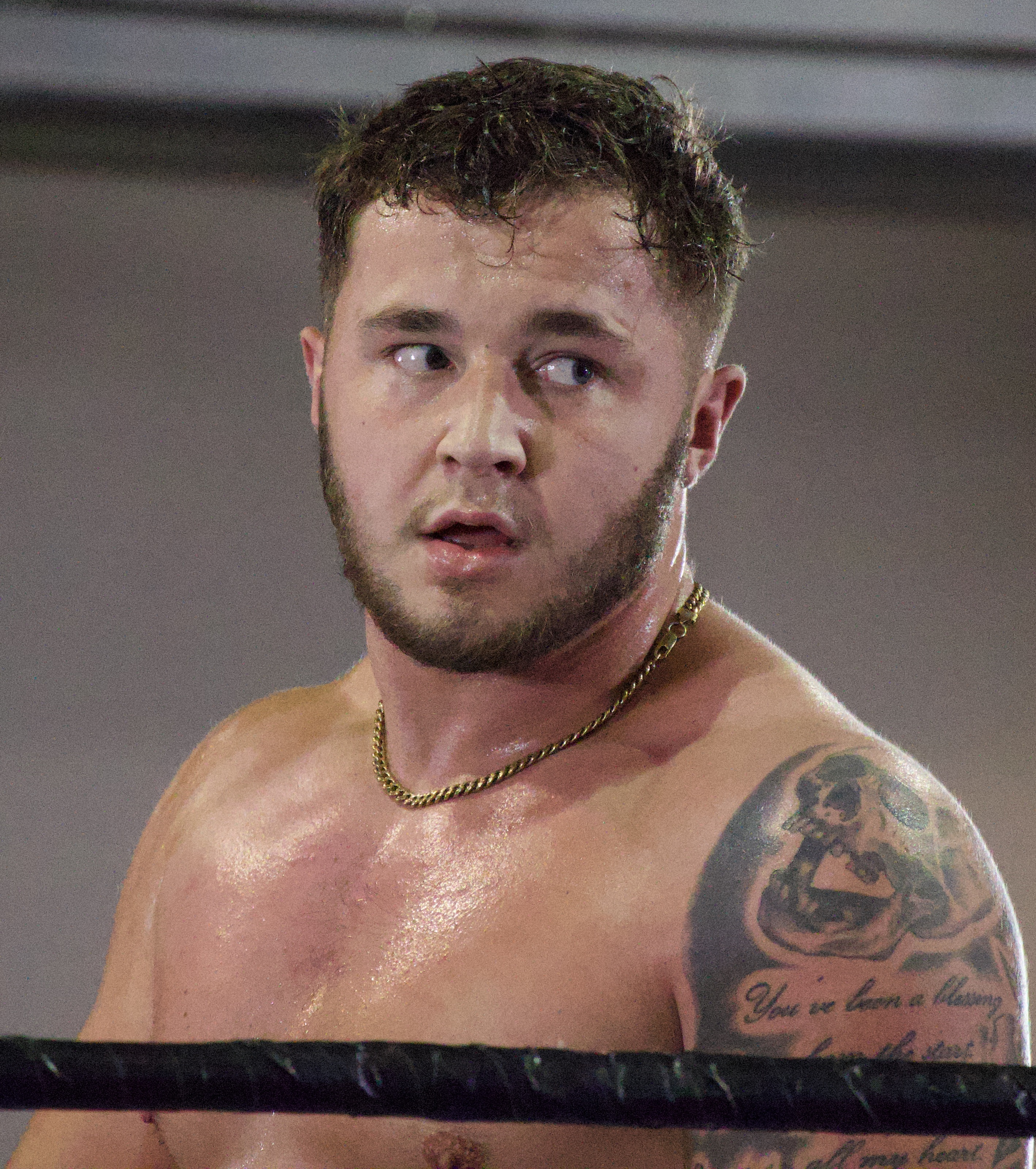
- Knight Jr. in April 2024

Personal information
- Born: Ricky Bevis; 26 February 2000 (age 26) Norwich, Norfolk, England
- Children: 2
- Relatives: Roy Knight (father); Ricky Knight (grandfather); Zak Zodiac (uncle); Saraya (aunt)

Professional wrestling career
- Ring name(s): Battlekat III; Ricky Knight Jr. RJ Knight; Zodiac Kid
- Billed height: 1.85 m (6 ft 1 in)
- Billed weight: 102 kg (225 lb)
- Trained by: Ricky Knight; Sweet Saraya; Zak Zodiac; Roy Knight
- Debut: 2011

Ricky Bevis (born 26 February 2000), better known by his ring name Ricky Knight Jr., is an English professional wrestler. currently working on the British independent circuit – predominantly for World Association of Wrestling (WAW) and Revolution Pro Wrestling (RevPro), where he is a former two-time Undisputed British Heavyweight Champion and former one-time Undisputed British Tag Team Champion with Roy Knight.

A third-generation wrestler, he is the son of Roy Knight and the grandson of Ricky Knight. Other family members include his uncle Zak Zodiac and his aunt Saraya. He has also wrestled for the family promotion World Association of Wrestling, where he is a multi-time champion, being the former and two-time WAW Television Champion.

== Professional wrestling career ==
=== World Association of Wrestling (2011–present) ===
Bevis made his professional wrestling debut in 2011 under the ring name Ricky Knight Jr.. A third-generation wrestler, Knight Jr. was trained by members of his family, including his father Roy Knight, grandfather Ricky Knight, aunt Saraya and uncle Zak Zodiac. He began his career primarily on the British independent wrestling circuit, including appearances for World Association of Wrestling (WAW), the promotion operated by his family. Knight has also remained active for World Association of Wrestling, the wrestling promotion founded by his grandfather Ricky Knight and operated by members of his family. He has won championships in the promotion and has competed alongside and against other members of the Knight family.

=== Revolution Pro Wrestling (2020–present) ===
Knight Jr. became a regular performer for Revolution Pro Wrestling (RevPro), where he competed against a number of established British and international wrestlers. In 2020, he challenged Michael Oku for the Southside Speed King Championship, losing the match as the title was unified with the Undisputed British Cruiserweight Championship.

In July 2021, Knight Jr. retired the Southside Heavyweight Championship and declared himself the "British Heavyweight Champion", using the championship belt previously associated with the title. He subsequently became involved in RevPro's heavyweight division and developed a rivalry with Luke Jacobs. RevPro later documented Knight Jr. claiming to be the "uncrowned" British Heavyweight Champion after previously defeating Will Ospreay.

Knight Jr. continued to appear regularly for RevPro during 2024. He defeated Zozaya at the promotion's 12th Anniversary Show on August 24, 2024, held at the Copper Box Arena in London.

Knight Jr. later became a two-time holder of the Undisputed British Heavyweight Championship. His second reign began in August 2025, when he defeated the reigning champion Michael Oku, and ended in December 2025 to Sha Samuels.

=== Progress Wrestling (2022–present) ===
Knight Jr. joined Progress Wrestling in 2022 and entered the eighth edition of the Natural Progression Series. He defeated Tate Mayfairs in the final of the tournament at Chapter 146: They Think It's All Over on November 27, 2022, winning the NPS trophy.

On February 26, 2023, Knight Jr. defeated Big Damo at Chapter 150: When The Man Comes Around to win the PROGRESS Atlas Championship for the first time. He held the championship for 404 days, making his reign the longest in the title's history at the time, and successfully defended it six times before losing the championship to Yoshiki Inamura at Chapter 166: Freedom Walks Again on April 5, 2024. He also reached the semifinals of the 2024 Super Strong Style 16 tournament.

== Championships and accomplishments ==
- British Wrestling Revolution
  - BWR Heavyweight Championship (1 time)
  - BWR Cruiserweight Championship (1 time)
  - BWR Underground Championship (1 time, current)
- 4th Generation Wrestling
  - 4GW Airborne Championship (1 time)
- European Catch Tour Association
  - ECTA Junior Heavyweight Championship (1 time, final)
  - ECTA Tag Team Championship (1 time, final) – with PJ Knight
- Immortal Wrestling
  - IW King Of England Championship (1 time, inaugural)
- Progress Wrestling
  - Progress Atlas Championship (1 time)
  - Natural Progression Series (2022)
- Pro Wrestling Illustrated
  - Ranked No. 116 of the top 500 singles wrestlers in the PWI 500 in 2023
- Revolution Pro Wrestling
  - Undisputed British Heavyweight Championship (2 time)
  - Southside Heavyweight Championship (1 time)
  - Undisputed British Tag Team Championship (1 time) – with Roy Knight
  - Southside Heavyweight Championship Tournament (2020)
- Southside Wrestling Entertainment
  - SWE European Championship (1 time)
  - SWE Speed King Championship (2 times)
  - SWE Tag Team Championship (1 time) – with Roy Knight and Zak Knight
  - Speed King Tournament (2019)
- Target Wrestling
  - High Octane Division Championship (1 time)
- World Association of Wrestling
  - WAW Undisputed World Heavyweight Championship (3 time)
  - WAW British Heavyweight Championship (2 times)
  - TWW Championship (1 time)
  - WAW European Heavyweight Championship (1 time)
  - WAW Open Light Heavyweight Championship (1 time)
  - WAW Television Championship (2 times, inaugural, final)
  - WAW U23 Championship (1 time)
  - WAW World Tag Team Championship (5 times) – with Hot Stuff, Ivan Trevors, Jimmy Ocean, Ricky Knight, Steve Quintain and Alex Young (1), Alexander Young (2), Roy Knight (1) and Brett Semtex (1)
  - King of The Ring (2022)
  - WAW Undisputed World Heavyweight Title #1 Contendership Tournament (2018)
