= British Open Tag Team Championship =

Professional wrestling tag team championship

Details
- Promotion: Rumble Wrestling Promotions previously All Star Wrestling and The Wrestling Alliance
- Date established: 1989
- Current champions: Kieron Lacey and Mark Trew
- Date won: 25 February 2006
Statistics
- First champions: King Ben and Kid McCoy
- Most reigns: The Superflys (Ricky Knight and Jimmy Ocean) (4 reigns)

The British (Open) Tag Team Championship is the top tag team championship contested for throughout the British wrestling circuit. For many years contested for in Brian Dixon's All Star Wrestling. It has recently been revived by Stephen Barker's Rumble Wrestling Promotions.

Although the title was created just after the end of regular wrestling coverage on ITV, nonetheless it has changed hands on national UK television, as footage of Steve Prince and Vic Powers' victory over Liverpool Lads Robbie Brookside and Doc Dean was included on Brookside's episode of Video Diaries on BBC2 in 1994. Also, author Simon Garfield included a detailed description of Brookside and Dean regaining the titles in Liverpool on 31 March 1995 in his book The Wrestling published by Faber and Faber

Many versions of the British Tag Team Titles exist in the independent circuit of the United Kingdom at any given time but the scene is usually dominated by one company's version. When another company becomes dominant the title often manages to unify itself or is brought into that company.

== Current champions ==
Kieron Lacey and Mark Trew won a tournament to determine new champions promoted by Rumble Promotions in Gillingham, Kent on 13 April 2024.

== Title history ==
Key
No.	Overall reign number
Reign	Reign number for the specific team—reign numbers for the individuals are in parentheses, if different
Days	Number of days held

No.	Champion	Championship change			Reign statistics		Notes	Ref.
No.	Champion	Date	Event	Location	Reign	Days	Notes	Ref.
All Star Wrestling
1	King Ben and Kid McCoy	1989	ASW show	N/A	1	N/A		
2	The Superflys (Ricky Knight and Jimmy Ocean)	29 March 1990	ASW show	Bristol	1	N/A		
3	Liverpool Lads (Robbie Brookside and "Doc" Dean)	23 January 1991	ASW show	Bath	1	N/A		
4	Task Force (Steve Prince and Vic Powers)	23 January 1993	ASW show	Norwich	1	N/A	Title change screened on BBC2 in Robbie Brookside's Video Diary. Win awarded by technical knockout after Brookside and Dean clashed heads.	
5	The Superflys (Ricky Knight and Jimmy Ocean)	13 March 1993	ASW show	Norwich	2	N/A		
6	Liverpool Lads (Robbie Brookside and "Doc" Dean)	31 March 1995	ASW show	Liverpool	2	N/A		
7	The Superflys (Ricky Knight and Jimmy Ocean)	1995	ASW show	N/A	3	N/A		
8	Power Rangers (Red and Blue)	15 June 1995	ASW show	Bristol	1	N/A		
—	Vacated	N/A	—	—	—	—	Belts were vacated when the Power Rangers gimmick was dropped.	
9	Marty Jones and Peter Collins	1 February 1996	N/A	Bristol	1	N/A	Defeated "Liverpool Lads" (Rob Brookside and "Doc" Dean)	
—	Vacated	N/A	—	N/A	—	—	Belts were vacated sometime later that year.	
10	The Superflys (Ricky Knight and Jimmy Ocean)	1996	N/A	N/A	4	N/A		
11	Jimmy Ocean (5) and Canary Kid	August 1998	N/A	N/A	1	N/A	Ocean defeated Ricky Knight in a singles match for the titles and chooses Kid as his partner.	
—	Deactivated	N/A	—	—	—	—		
The Wrestling Alliance
12	The New Superflys (Ricky Knight (5) and Roy Knight)	2001	TWA show	N/A	1	N/A		
13	Robbie Brookside (3) and Doug Williams	2 February 2002	TWA show	Margate	1	N/A		
—	Deactivated	N/A	—	—	—	—		
All Star Wrestling
14	UK Dream Team (Kid Cool and Dean "2 Xtreme" Allmark)	7 June 2005	ASW show	Croydon	1	263	Defeated "The Chippendales" Mikey Whiplash and Johnny Midnight to be recognized by All-Star.	
15	Mikey Whiplash and Robbie Dynamite	25 February 2006	ASW show	Staffordshire	1	7,379+		
—	Deactivated	N/A	—	—	—	—		
Rumble Wrestling Promotions
16	Keiron Lacey and Mark Trew	13 April 2024	Rumble show	Gravesend, Kent	1	263	Won an eight team elimination tournament	
17	Xander and Leland Bryant	31 January 2026	Rumble show	Selsdon	1	99		
17	Keiron Lacey and Mark Trew	9 May 2026	Rumble show	Ashford, Kent	2	1		

== See also ==
- Professional wrestling in the United Kingdom
- RBW British Tag Team Championship
- RQW/IPW:UK Unified British Tag Team Championship
