= Bellatrix Female Warriors =

British independent professional wrestling promotion

- Acronym: BFW
- Founded: 2005
- Style: Women's professional wrestling
- Headquarters: Norwich, Norfolk, United Kingdom
- Founder: Sweet Saraya
- Owner(s): Sweet Saraya; Ricky Knight
- Sister: World Association of Wrestling
- Formerly: World Association of Women's Wrestling
- Website: wawuk.com

Bellatrix Female Warriors, also known as Bellatrix, is a British independent women's professional wrestling promotion based in Norwich. The company was founded by Sweet Saraya in 2006 as the World Association of Women's Wrestling, a sister company to her husband Ricky Knight's World Association of Wrestling. The promotion tours theatres, leisure centres, and town halls.

== History ==
The company was founded by Sweet Saraya in 2005 as the World Association of Women's Wrestling, a sister company to her husband Ricky Knight's World Association of Wrestling. The name was later changed to Bellatrix Female Warriors, as bellatrix is Latin for "female warrior". The company trains their own wrestlers, as well as hosts international talent. Trainees are taught traditional British catch wrestling. In addition, shows are promoted via video on demand or internet pay-per-view (iPPV).

Bellatrix has working agreements with Real Quality Wrestling, Shimmer Women Athletes, IndyGurlz Australia, and LDN Wrestling. The promotions cross-promote shows and championships.

== Championships ==
=== Current ===
Championship	Champion(s)	Previous	Date won	Days	Reference
Bellatrix World Championship	Tra-cie	Vacant (Note: Trai-cie won the vacant Bellatrix World Championship against Lady Bella van der Velt.)	3 May 2024	733+	
Bellatrix European Championship	Annabelle	Vanessa Knight	14 December 2024	508+	
Bellatrix British Championship	Princess	Fiona	1 November 2024	551+	
Bellatrix Academy Championship	Roksie	Vacant (Note: Roksie won the vacant Bellatrix Academy Championship against Scarlett.)	3 May 2024	733+	

=== Retired ===
Championship	Last champion(s)	Date won	Date retired	Previous champion(s)	First champion(s)	Reference
WAWW European Championship	Blue Nikita	10 June 2007	2009	Inaugural	Blue Nikita	
WAWW Tag Team Championship	The Norfolk Dolls (Britani Knight & Melodi)	10 June 2007	2009	Inaugural	The Norfolk Dolls (Britani Knight & Melodi)	

=== Queen of the Ring Tournament ===
Year	Winner	Ref
2012	Destiny	
2014	Lory	
2015	Blue Nikita	
2017	Queen Maya	
2022	Lory	
2024	Lady Bella Van Der Velt	

== See also ==
- Professional wrestling in the United Kingdom
- List of professional wrestling promotions in the United Kingdom
