= Zak Zodiac =

British professional wrestler

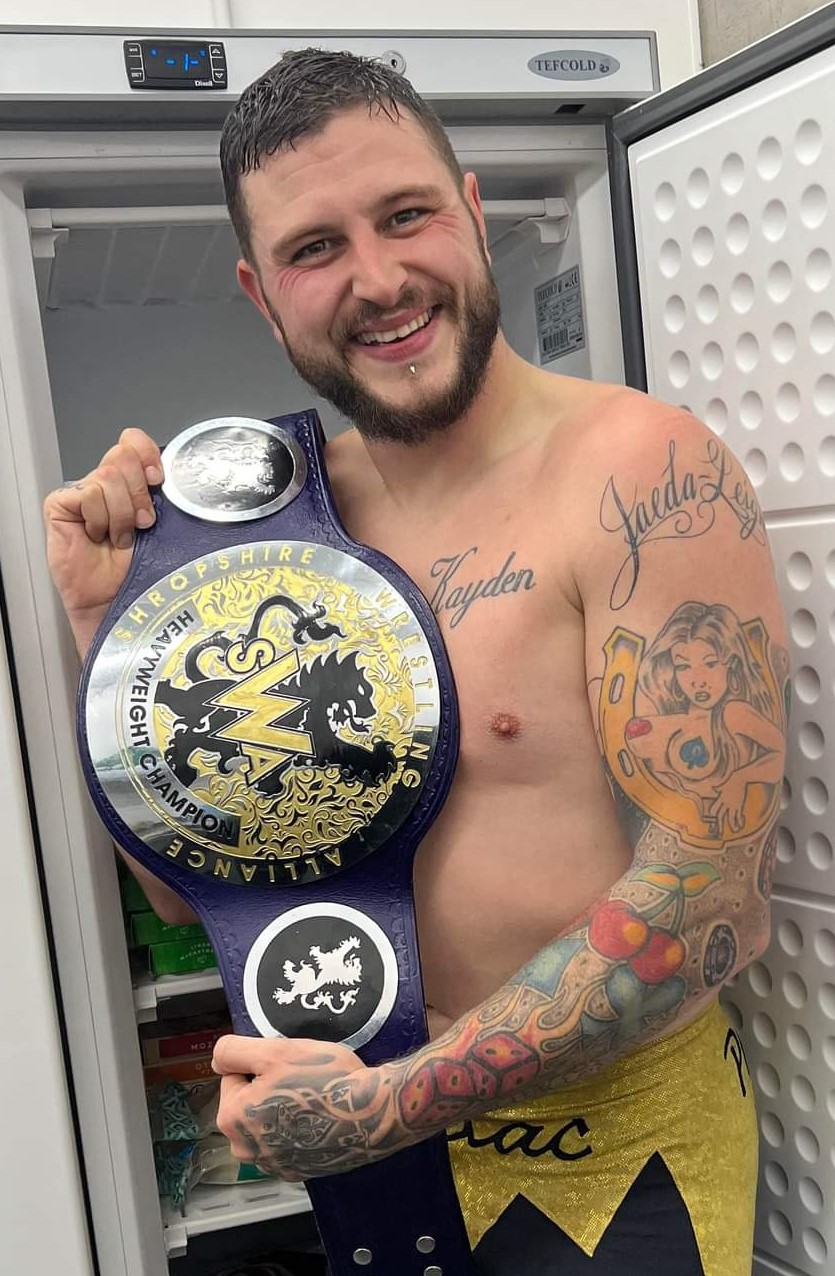
- Zodiac in 2023

Personal information
- Born: Zak Harley Frary; 29 May 1991 (age 35) Norwich, Norfolk, England
- Spouse: Courtney Bevis
- Children: 3
- Family: Ricky Knight (father); Sweet Saraya (mother); Saraya (sister); Roy Bevis (half-brother)

Professional wrestling career
- Ring name(s): Bexx; Mini Michaels; Mini Mysterio; Zak Knight; Zak Bevis; Zak Zodiac
- Billed height: 1.85 m (6 ft 1 in)
- Billed weight: 87 kg (192 lb)
- Billed from: Norwich, England
- Trained by: Ricky Knight; Roy Bevis
- Debut: 2001

Zak Harley Bevis (né Frary; born 29 May 1991) is an English professional wrestler. He is best known for his time in All Elite Wrestling (AEW), where he performed under the ring name Zak Knight and was a member of The Outcasts stable. He also performed for AEW's sister promotion Ring of Honor (ROH).

He mainly competes under the ring names Zak Knight or Zak Zodiac in World Association of Wrestling, which is owned and operated by his family. He also regularly leads training for his family's wrestling school and has done seminars for other companies.

== Professional wrestling career ==
=== World Association of Wrestling (2002–present) ===
Bevis began wrestling at the age of 10 years old for his father's promotion World Association of Wrestling. His first championship match was against Phil Lea for the WAW Youth Championship which Zodiac lost. While wrestling for WAW, Zodiac would take on members of his family multiple times including his mother (Sweet Saraya), father (Ricky Knight), sister (Britani Knight, now better known as Paige) and his brother (Zebra Kid). In 2006, Zodiac defeated his father to become the WAW Pontins Open Champion. At WAW Champion's Night, Zodiac won a 15-man royal rumble. He won the WAW King of the Ring 2007 by defeating The Cougar Kid in the finals. In the summer of 2007, Zodiac took on Jonny Storm in a best two out of three falls match for the WAW British Lightweight Championship; after both gaining a pinfall, Storm got the final pin. In August 2008, Zodiac took on Erik Isaksen for the WAW Heavyweight Championship in a best two out of three falls match. Both men gained a pinfall, however the match would end up being stopped by the referee. On 2 March 2008, Zodiac defeated Paul Tyrell to win the WAW British Cruiserweight Championship in a best two out of three falls match. He would hold the championship until April 2010. Zodiac entered the WAW King Of The Ring 2009, but was eliminated by Zebra Kid. He took on Aron Frost in a match for the vacant WAW European Championship and lost. Since 2011, he has only sporadically performed for WAW, only competing a few times a year.

At Trouble At The Talk 3, Zodiac defeated WAW World Heavyweight Champion Steve Corino to capture the title for the first time.

=== Real Deal Wrestling (2006–2009) ===
On 12 July 2006, Zodiac debuted for Real Deal Wrestling at RDW vs WAW and took on Dave Rayne for the RDW Lincolnshire Regional Championship and lost. In August, he won a RDW Heavyweight Championship number one contendership battle royal and took on the champion, Mick Romeo, a few days later and lost. With things looking bleak, two days later, he entered a gauntlet match for the RDW Lincolnshire Regional Championship and won. He would lose the championship three months later to Sykes in a triple threat ladder match which also included The Dominator. On 3 February 2007, he teamed up with his father Ricky Knight, and defeated (The)UK Pitbulls for the RDW Tag Team Championship. The duo proved to be a formidable team, holding the championship for nine months before losing it to The Underdogs (Luc Harrison and Nathan Chalder) in a five-way tag team match. Zodiac reached the final of the King of the Castle 2008 tournament before losing to Havok. In 2009, he had multiple championship matches and failed to capitalise on any of them.

=== Norwegian Wrestling Federation (2006–2007) ===
Zodiac would make his first wrestling appearance outside of the United Kingdom when he travelled to Norway and debuted for the Norwegian Wrestling Federation. There, he teamed up with his father to defeat Fremtiden. Zodiac participated in the Max21 Cup and got to the final where he was eliminated by Gabriel Antonick.

=== The Hooligans (2010–present) ===
In late 2010, Zodiac would begin to regularly team up with his brother Roy Bevis. In time, they began calling themselves the Football Hooligans with Zodiac changing his ring name to Bexx and Bevis changing his ring name to Bud. Their first match as the Football Hooligans came in November at a Herts And Essex Wrestling and World Association Of Wrestling joint event which the pair won. The pair would go on quite the winning streak in early 2011 which led to a street fight against the Devil's Playboys (Brett Meadows and Sam Knee) for the HEW Tag Team Championship. Winning this match marked the first tag team championship for the newly named Hooligans. With their success in the United Kingdom, the Hooligans travelled over to Germany to take on Christian Eckstein and Leon van Gasteren at European Wrestling Promotion for the EWP Tag Team Championship, but would return to England unsuccessful. The Hooligans began appearing for one of Britain's top wrestling promotions, International Pro Wrestling: United Kingdom where they have traded wins with Project Ego (Kris Travis and Martin Kirby). The Hooligans have also appeared for All Star Wrestling. On 15 September 2012, they defeated Army of Two (Scott Fusion and Aaron Sharpe) to win the vacant RQW European Tag Team Championship. On 23 March 2013, they were defeated by Fusion and Sharpe for the title. The Hooligans debuted for Insane Championship Wrestling in their hometown of Norwich on 17 October 2015.

=== WWE (2011) ===
On the 11 November 2011 episode of SmackDown, Zodiac, alongside Andy Baker and Tom LaRuffa, appeared in a 3 on 1 handicap match against the Big Show during his feud with Mark Henry, but the trio were defeated.

=== All Elite Wrestling / Ring of Honor (2022–2025) ===
Bevis made his All Elite Wrestling (AEW) debut at Full Gear, appearing as a spectator in support of his sister Saraya, in her match against Britt Baker. He made another appearance as a spectator, with the rest of his family to support Saraya again at All In. In December 2023, Bevis, now going by his "Zak Knight" ring name, began to work for AEW and the sister promotion Ring of Honor (ROH), joining Saraya's stable The Outcasts. In March 2025, Knight's AEW contract expired and was not renewed, ending his tenure with the promotion.

== Personal life ==
Bevis is part of a professional wrestling family. Both his mother and father, known as Sweet Saraya and Ricky Knight respectively, are professional wrestlers, as are his siblings, half-brother Roy and his sister Saraya-Jade, who is better known as Paige. The family runs the World Association of Wrestling (WAW) promotion based in Norwich. In July 2012, Channel 4 produced a documentary about the Knights entitled The Wrestlers: Fighting with My Family. The documentary was adapted into a feature film by Stephen Merchant and executive producer Dwayne Johnson, titled Fighting with My Family, with Jack Lowden playing Zak Bevis, while Bevis himself has a cameo role as a gang lieutenant. The film premiered at the Sundance Film Festival in 2019. He is married to his childhood sweetheart Courtney, with whom he has three children.

== Championships and accomplishments ==
- Championship Xtreme Wrestling
  - CXW World Championship (1 time)
- DAM Promotions
  - DAM Trophy Tournament (2006)
- Shropshire Wrestling Alliance
  - SWA Championship (1 time)
- Dynamic Over-The-Top Action Wrestling
  - DOA UK Heavyweight Championship (1 time)
- Championship Of Wrestling
  - cOw Heavyweight Championship (1 time)
- European Catch Tour Association
  - ECTA Tag Team Championship (1 time) – with Roy Knight
  - European Tag Team Grand Prix (2014) – with Roy Knight
- Classic UK Pro Wrestling
  - CUKPW 24/7 Championship (1 time)
- Herts and Essex Wrestling
  - HEW Heavyweight Championship (1 time)
  - HEW Tag Team Championship (2 times) – with Roy Knight/Bud
  - Isak Rain Memorial Cup (2008)
- Preston City Wrestling
  - PCW Tag Team Championship (1 time) – with Roy Knight
- All-Star Wrestling
  - Tag Team Tournament (2021) – with Roy Knight
- Power of Wrestling
  - POW Tag Team Championship (1 time) – with Roy Knight
- Pro Wrestling Elite
  - PWE Tag Team Championship (1 time) – with Roy Knight
- Pro Wrestling Illustrated
  - Ranked No. 377 of the top 500 singles wrestlers in the PWI 500 in 2018
- Real Deal Wrestling
  - RDW Tag Team Championship (2 times) – with Ricky Knight (1), Roy Knight (1)
  - RDW Lincolnshire Regional Championship (1 time)
- Real Quality Wrestling
  - RQW European Tag Team Championship (2 times) – with Roy Knight
- Heritage Catch Pro
  - HCP Heritage World Championship (1 time, inaugural)
  - HCP Heritage World Title Tournament (2023)
- Southside Wrestling Entertainment
  - SWE Tag Team Championship (1 time) – with Roy Knight and Ricky Knight Jr.
- Future Wrestling Entertainment
  - FWE World Heavyweight Championship (1 time)
- Target Wrestling
  - Target Wrestling Tag Team Championship (1 time) – with Roy Knight
- World Association of Wrestling
  - WAW Undisputed World Heavyweight Championship (2 times)
  - WAW British Heavyweight Championship (1 time)
  - WAW European Heavyweight Championship (1 time)
  - WAW British Light Heavyweight Championship (1 time)
  - WAW British Cruiserweight Championship (1 time)
  - WAW Pontins Open Championship (3 times)
  - TWW Championship (1 time, inaugural)
  - WAW World Tag Team Championship (4 times) (with Kayden Knight (1), with Roy Knight (3))
  - RQW European Tag Team Championship (1 time, final) – with Roy Knight
  - TWW Title Tournament (2019)
  - WAW King of the Ring (2007)
- X Wrestling Alliance
  - British Inter-Federation Cup (2007) - with Jo FX, Kraft, and Ricky Knight
