= Ian Dean =

British professional wrestler (1970–2018)

Personal information
- Born: 3 July 1970 Liverpool, England
- Died: 13 August 2018 (aged 48) Orlando, Florida, U.S.

Professional wrestling career
- Ring name: Doc Dean
- Billed height: 1.78 m (5 ft 10 in)
- Billed weight: 11.6 st (162 lb; 74 kg)
- Debut: 1984
- Retired: 1998

Ian Dean (3 July 1970 – 13 August 2018) was an English professional wrestler, best known as Doc Dean. He worked for All Star Wrestling, often teaming with Robbie Brookside as The Liverpool Lads. In 1997, he participated on New Japan Pro-Wrestling's Best of the Super Juniors tournament, defeating Jushin Thunder Liger. He also worked televised matches for World Championship Wrestling in the late 1990s.

== Professional wrestling career ==
Dean made his debut at the age of 14 in 1984 for All Star Wrestling (ASW). He worked for the promotion throughout the 1980s and 1990s. He teamed with Robbie Brookside to form The Liverpool Lads, a successful tag team in Britain. Together, they held the ASW British Tag Team Championship twice. They team disbanded after Dean turned on partner Brookside, setting up a feud between the two. Later they would reconcile only for Brookside to turn on Dean in 1995 in Croydon. However they later reconciled again, this time permanently. The duo were the subject of a BBC2 video diary that captured matches, backstage footage, and details about life on the road. On occasions, Dean teamed up with the third member of The Liverpool Lads, Frankie Sloan. The three toured Africa, Asia, and Europe. As a singles wrestler, Dean also held the British Welterweight Championship twice.

In 1997, Dean attended the Best of the Super Juniors tournament for New Japan Pro-Wrestling, during which he defeated Jushin Thunder Liger and Chavo Guerrero Jr. He met Chris Jericho in Japan, who later recounted their time together in his autobiography A Lion's Tale: Around the World in Spandex. Later that year, he signed a contract with World Championship Wrestling (WCW) and he and Brookside appeared on WCW Saturday Night and WCW Main Event as enhancement talent. Dean worked for WCW until July 1998, when he decided to retire from wrestling due to injuries.

== Personal life ==
Dean set up his own plumbing business in Florida shortly after retiring. He later had to quit his job due to neck and back injuries.

He had three children. He had a son, Adam, with female wrestler Klondyke Kate.

On 13 August 2018, Dean died from a heart attack at his home in Orlando, Florida; he was 48 years old. After his death, Klondyke Kate opened a fundraising page to raise money to send Dean's body across the Atlantic to be buried in his hometown of Liverpool.

== Championships and accomplishments ==
- All Star Wrestling

- ASW British Tag Team Championship (2 times) - with Robbie Brookside
- British Welterweight Championship (2 times)

- European Wrestling Union

- EWU European Tag Team Championship (1 time) - with Robbie Brookside

- Other Championships

- British Commonwealth Junior Heavyweight Championship (1 time)
