= RBW British Tag Team Championship =

Professional wrestling tag team championship

Details
- Promotion: United Kingdown Wrestling Alliance; Revolution British Wrestling
- Date established: February 2003
- Date retired: 2005
Statistics
- First champions: Boogie Knights (Scotty Hexx and Kris Travis)
- Final champions: Ross Jordan and Stixx

The RBW British Tag Team Championship was one of the official British tag team titles; it was contested for in Revolution British Wrestling. However, the championship's origin was within the United Kingdom Wrestling Alliance, where it was known as the UKWA British Tag Team Championship. UKWA is slated to return along with the titles.

== History ==
The UKWA British Tag Team Champions were first crowned during February 2003 in a match between the "Boogie Knights" Scotty Hexx and Kris Travis and the "Urban Warriors" Will Assault and Rainz, "The Boogie Knights" would win this match and the titles. However, Just two weeks later "The Urban Warriors" would win a return match to take the titles away from "The Boogie Knights", but not before having a public disagreement in the ring. This would lead to both men vacating the championships the very next morning.

On Sunday March 23, 2003 an 8-team tournament was held in Sheffield, containing many top tag teams in the country. The Champions were crowned when Andi Le Bon and Karl Harker, known as the "Brit Pack", narrowly defeated the combination of "Golden Boy" Cameron Knite and Chris Lightning in the final.

The pair would hold the titles for a few months before being defeated by the team of Domino and "Rage" Andy Baker in July 2003 in Sheffield, England.

The next month RBW's working relationship with UKWA was announced and on a joint show RBW wrestlers Stixx and "The Gift" Ross Jordan would defeat the UKWA team and bring the titles under the RBW banner.

With the United Kingdom Wrestling Alliance's relationship with Revolution British Wrestling announced, a revolutionary new rule was introduced, where the Champions could consist of three wrestlers, as opposed to just two. When it came to Championship defenses, the Champion team could consist of any two of the three.

In Killamarsh, during November 2003, Stixx was in singles action, meaning that Ross Jordan needed to use the unknown third partner. After the original chosen partner Kruiz wasn't available, Ross Jordan and Stixx announced that J.C Thunder had moved to the South of England, to get away from the North, and was now the third partner of the Tag Team Champions, which was soon named the "Southern Alliance".

Since then, the group shifted its members with Ross Jordan leaving and being replaced by Chris Wyld as the third man that would defend the Championship. The Southern Alliance group kept a stronghold on the British Tag Team Championships until UKWA's hiatus in August 2004 and the eventual closer of RBW in late 2005.

In early 2006 it was announced that United Kingdom Wrestling Alliance would be set to return later in 2006. This announcement came from UKWA's Director of Sports Entertainment, Andrew Huntington, who also stated that UKWA would also recognise "The Southern Alliance" as their current UKWA British Tag Team Champions.

=== Title history ===
Wrestlers:	Reigns:	Date:	Place:	Notes:
United Kingdom Wrestling Alliance
Boogie Knights (Scotty Hexx and Kris Travis)	1	February 2003	Killamarsh, Sheffield	Defeated "The Urban Warriors" in a match to crown first champions
Urban Warriors; Will Assault and Rainz	1	Late February (early March)		
The next day the titles were vacated and a tournament was later announced.
Brit Pack; Andi Le Bon and Karl Harker)	1	March 23, 2003	Sheffield	Defeated Cameron Knite and Chris Lightning in a tournament final
Domino and Andy Baker .	1	July 2003		
In September 2003 UKWA's Working Relationship with RBW was announced.
Revolution British Wrestling
Ross Jordan and Stixx	1	3 August 2003	Runcorn, Cheshire	RBW wrestlers Jordan and Stixx would defeat the UKWA team and the titles came under the RBW banner
The Southern Alliance members Ross Jordon, Stixx, Chris Wyld, Blondie Barratt and J.C Thunder would each defend the titles and be considered champions at one point or another.
Titles abandoned with RBW's closer in late 2005.

== See also ==
- Professional wrestling in the United Kingdom
- British Open Tag Team Championship
