= Fighting with My Family =

2019 film by Stephen Merchant

- Theatrical release poster
- Directed by: Stephen Merchant
- Written by: Stephen Merchant
- Based on: The Wrestlers: Fighting with My Family by Max Fisher
- Produced by: Kevin Misher; Dwayne Johnson; Dany Garcia; Stephen Merchant; Michael J. Luisi
- Starring: Florence Pugh; Lena Headey; Nick Frost; Jack Lowden; Vince Vaughn; Dwayne Johnson
- Cinematography: Remi Adefarasin
- Edited by: Nancy Richardson
- Music by: Vik Sharma; Graham Coxon
- Production companies: Metro-Goldwyn-Mayer Pictures; Film4; The Ink Factory; Seven Bucks Productions; Misher Films; WWE Studios
- Distributed by: Lionsgate (United Kingdom); Metro-Goldwyn-Mayer Pictures (United States); Universal Pictures (International); Bloom (Some select territories)
- Release dates: 28 January 2019 (Sundance); 14 February 2019 (United States); 27 February 2019 (United Kingdom)
- Running time: 108 minutes
- Countries: United Kingdom; United States
- Language: English
- Budget: $11 million
- Box office: $41.5 million

Fighting with My Family is a 2019 biographical sports comedy-drama film written and directed by Stephen Merchant. Based on the 2012 documentary The Wrestlers: Fighting with My Family by Max Fisher, it depicts the career of English professional wrestler Paige as she makes her way to WWE, while also following her brother Zak Zodiac, as he struggles with his failure to achieve similar success. Florence Pugh and Jack Lowden star as Paige and Zodiac respectively, alongside Lena Headey, Nick Frost, Vince Vaughn, and Dwayne Johnson, with the latter also acting as producer.

The film premiered at the Sundance Film Festival on 28 January 2019 and was theatrically released in the United States on 14 February 2019. It received positive reviews from critics, particularly for Merchant's directing and the performances of Pugh and Vaughn. The film grossed $41.5 million worldwide.

== Plot ==
Wrestlers Ricky and Julia Knight raise their children, Saraya and Zak, to follow in their footsteps; as young adults, the siblings apply to join the WWE, and are evaluated by veteran trainer Hutch Morgan, who agrees to let them try out before a SmackDown taping at The O2 Arena, where they meet WWE legend Dwayne "The Rock" Johnson. Shortly before her tryout, Saraya adopts the stage name "Paige", after her favorite character on the TV show Charmed.

Morgan chooses Paige to train for the WWE, but not Zak, despite Paige's protests. Morgan forces Zak to return home after making it clear he will never be signed to the WWE, leaving Paige with no one to stick up for her. Arriving at NXT in Florida, Paige has difficulty with the training, especially given that her fellow trainees are mostly models and cheerleaders who have no wrestling experience and thus make poor training partners. Paige also struggles with performing choreographed promos as they clash with her own natural instincts, and suffers from Morgan's constant belittlement of her mistakes.

During her WWE debut at an NXT live event, Paige is heckled by the crowd and freezes, leaving the ring in tears. She tries bleaching her dark hair and gets a spray tan in a desperate attempt to fit in with her peers. After failing an obstacle course, Paige lashes out at the other trainees for gossiping about her before realizing they weren't. A sympathetic Morgan then reveals to Paige the real reason he didn't let Zak sign up: the league would have forced him to work as a jobber, which would have ruined his health. Morgan implies that a similar experience forced him to give up on his own wrestling career.

Believing that professional wrestling isn't worth it and that she'd have a much happier life helping her parents train other wrestlers, Paige decides to quit the WWE and return to her hometown of Norwich. She travels home for the Christmas break to inform her family of her decision. Angry that she is giving up on the dream that he failed to achieve, Zak attacks Paige during a wrestling match and then gets in a drunken bar fight. Paige changes her mind after Zak berates her for giving up, and she returns to Florida to rejoin the WWE. She reasserts her individuality by re-adopting her original hair colour and skin tone, rapidly improves in training, and befriends and encourages many of her fellow trainees.

Morgan brings the trainees to WrestleMania XXX, where The Rock greets Paige and tells her she will make her Raw debut the following night against the WWE Divas Champion, AJ Lee. Paige makes her Raw debut, where she again freezes and takes a severe beating from Lee before finally turning the tables and beating the champion. Claiming Lee's title for herself, she proudly declares "this is MY house now!" as her family and friends cheer her victory back home.

== Cast ==
- Florence Pugh as Saraya Knight / Paige, Zak's little sister and Ricky and Julia's daughter. Her stunts during wrestling scenes were performed by Tessa Blanchard. Tori Ellen Ross portrays a young Saraya.
- Lena Headey as Julia Knight / Sweet Saraya, Paige and Zak's mother and Ricky's wife.
- Nick Frost as Ricky Knight, Paige and Zak's father and Julia's husband.
- Jack Lowden as Zak Knight / Zak Zodiac, Paige's older brother and Ricky and Julia's son. Thomas Willey portrays a young Zak.
- Kim Matula as Jeri-Lynn
- Ellie Gonsalves as Madison
- Aqueela Zoll as Kirsten
- Julia Davis as Daphne, Courtney's mother.
- Thea Trinidad as AJ Lee
- Vince Vaughn as Hutch Morgan, a recruiter and coach for the WWE.
- Dwayne Johnson as himself / The Rock

Additionally, James Burrows portrays Roy Knight, who is Ricky's son, Julia's stepson, and Zak and Paige's older half-brother. Hannah Rae portrays Zak's girlfriend, Courtney. Director Stephen Merchant portrays Hugh, Courtney's father. Elroy Powell appears as Union Jack, and Jack Gouldbourne appears as Calum. WWE wrestlers Big Show, Sheamus and The Miz make appearances as themselves, while an uncredited actor played John Cena. Michael Cole, Jerry Lawler, and John "Bradshaw" Layfield provide commentary on the Paige vs. AJ Lee match, while Jim Ross provided commentary on The Rock's match. Several other WWE wrestlers (including Cena himself), as well as the real Knight family, appear in archival footage throughout the film, while Zak Zodiac himself appears in a cameo as a gang lieutenant.

== Production ==
On 7 February 2017, The Hollywood Reporter reported that Dwayne Johnson and Stephen Merchant had teamed with WWE Studios and Film4 to produce a film based on the life of Saraya "Paige" Bevis, a professional wrestler with the WWE. Merchant would write and direct the film, while Johnson would cameo in the film and executive produce. In the days after the announcement, the main cast was revealed: Florence Pugh as Saraya, Jack Lowden as Saraya's brother Zak, and Lena Headey and Nick Frost as their parents. Metro-Goldwyn-Mayer Pictures acquired the distribution rights on 10 February for US$17.5 million. On 14 February, Johnson announced that Vince Vaughn had been cast, and filming would commence the following day. In-ring scenes were filmed after WWE Raw on 20 February at the Staples Center in Los Angeles. Filming also took place around Bracknell, Berkshire, specifically the Harmans Water area, also in and around Norwich, Norfolk, England, with locations around the city used in the film, as well as the seaside town of Great Yarmouth, and at Shepperton Studios. Scenes that depicted Paige training with NXT in Florida were shot in Orlando, Florida and Long Beach, California.

=== Historical accuracy ===
Like many biographical films, the film took several liberties with Paige's journey with WWE. The film had her start her WWE career performing for NXT when she actually first performed in Florida Championship Wrestling, Paige's time in NXT was kept minimal with no mention of her reign as NXT Women's Champion, and several characters were fictional, including Hutch Morgan. Additionally, Paige had previously failed a WWE tryout before being successful in another. Johnson himself never met Paige (or any of the Bevis/Knight family) until seeing the original documentary in 2012, unlike the film's fictionalized portrayal of Johnson meeting Paige and Zak backstage at a WWE event in England; Johnson himself had just returned to WWE in 2011 after a seven-year absence when Paige signed with WWE in April 2011.

== Release ==
Fighting with My Family premiered at the 2019 Sundance Film Festival on 28 January. It was released in the United States on 14 February 2019, in four theatres in Los Angeles and New York, and expanded to a wide release on 22 February 2019. It was released on 27 February 2019 in the United Kingdom. The movie was pre-sold internationally by sales representative Bloom.

== Reception ==
=== Box office ===
Fighting with My Family grossed $41.5 million worldwide against a production budget of $11 million.

In its limited opening weekend, Fighting with My Family made $162,567 from four theaters over the four-day President's Day weekend. The film expanded to 2,711 theaters the following weekend and made $2.6 million on its first Friday wide, including $450,000 from Thursday night previews, and went on to gross $8 million for the weekend, finishing fourth at the box office. In its second weekend of wide release, the film made $4.7 million, dropping 40% and finishing seventh.

=== Critical response ===
On review aggregator website Rotten Tomatoes, the film holds an approval rating of 93% based on 242 reviews, with an average rating of 7.2/10. The website's critical consensus reads, "Much like the sport it celebrates, Fighting with My Family muscles past clichés with a potent blend of energy and committed acting that should leave audiences cheering." On Metacritic, the film has a weighted average score of 68 out of 100, based on 38 critics, indicating "generally favorable" reviews. Audiences polled by CinemaScore gave the film an average grade of "A−" on an A+ to F scale, while those at PostTrak gave it an overall positive score of 83% and a 57% "definite recommend".

Nick Allen of RogerEbert.com opined in a three-out-of-four star review: "Even though Fighting with My Family is undoubtedly about branding the WWE as a fantasy factory, its biggest strengths are its wit and surprisingly big heart."

== Stage adaptation ==
In April 2026, it was announced that the film is to be adapted into a stage musical by Jon Brittain, with music by Miranda Cooper and Nick Coler; the production will be developed throughout 2026 with an anticipated premiere sometime in 2027.
