= The Outcasts (professional wrestling) =

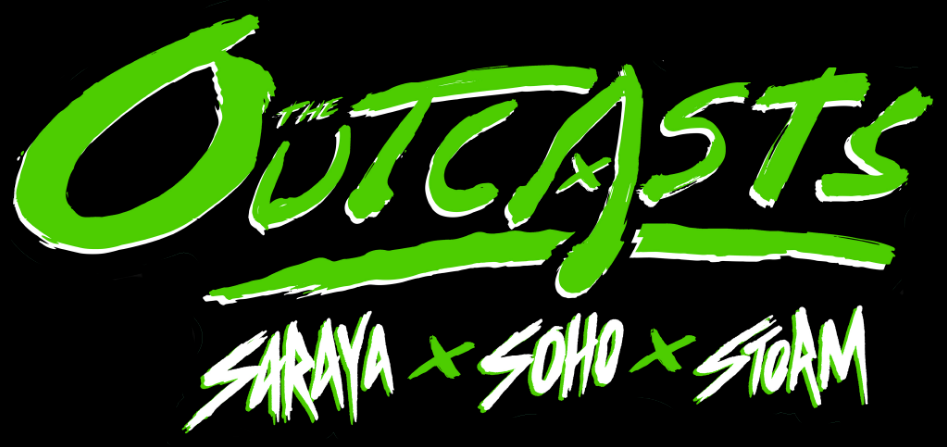
- The Outcasts' logo

Stable
- Leader: Saraya
- Members: Toni Storm; Ruby Soho; Harley Cameron; Zak Knight
- Debut: January 18, 2023
- Disbanded: March 26, 2025
- Years active: 2023–2025

The Outcasts were a villainous professional wrestling stable in All Elite Wrestling (AEW). Formed in January 2023, the team originally consisted of Saraya, Toni Storm, and Ruby Soho, women who were formerly members of the WWE roster and considered themselves slighted and sidelined by AEW because of that previous association. Toni Storm was a member until she was ousted from the group in September 2023; she had also held the AEW Women's World Championship once while part of the group. In December 2023, Harley Cameron joined the group. In February 2024, Ruby Soho would leave the group as well, with Saraya's real-life brother Zak Knight joining as her replacement. In March 2025, Zak Knight left the group when his contract expired with the promotion. Saraya would follow suit later that month as she announced her departure from the promotion, effectively disbanding the group.

== History ==
On the December 23 episode of Dynamite, Toni Storm would team with Saraya in a losing effort. The following week, Saraya and Storm continued to work together. Following this, Saraya and Storm would dub themselves as "Outsiders". Saraya and Storm began wearing matching lime-green and black attire and would attack their opponents after matches with spray paint.

At the Revolution event on March 5, 2023, after Jamie Hayter defeated Ruby Soho and Saraya to retain the AEW Women's World Championship, Soho beat down Hayter and Baker before aligning herself with Saraya and Storm. On March 10, the group became officially known as "The Outcasts". On May 28 at Double or Nothing, Storm defeated Hayter to win the AEW Women's World Championship. Storm would lose the title 66 days later to Shida during the 200th episode of Dynamite.

On August 27 at All In, Saraya won the AEW Women's World Championship in a four-way match where she used a spray can on Storm before pinning her. Following Saraya's victory, tensions between Storm and Saraya continued to grow. At All Out, Storm seemingly turned on The Outcasts when she stopped Soho from using spray paint against AEW TBS Champion Kris Statlander in their title match. At Grand Slam, Storm failed to win the AEW Women's World Championship from Saraya. Saraya lost the title to Shida on the October 10 episode of Dynamite Title Tuesday, ending her reign at 44 days. Soho attempted to interfere with the spray paint but was thwarted by Storm. On the December 27 episode of Dynamite, Harley Cameron joined the group. On the February 9 episode of Rampage, Ruby Soho abandoned Saraya in a tag match and attacked Harley Cameron, leaving the Outcasts after weeks of dissension. On the February 23 episode of Rampage, Saraya introduced her brother Zak Knight as the newest signee of AEW and member of The Outcasts. On June 19 episode of Dynamite, Anna Jay allied with Saraya and Cameron. On March 26, 2025, Saraya announced her departure from AEW, effectively disbanding the stable.

== Members ==
L	Leader(s)
*	Founding member(s)

=== Former ===
Members		Joined	Left
Saraya	*L	January 18, 2023	March 26, 2025
Toni Storm	*	January 18, 2023	September 3, 2023
Ruby Soho		March 5, 2023	February 9, 2024
Harley Cameron		December 27, 2023	March 26, 2025
Zak Knight		February 23, 2024	March 4, 2025

== Championships and accomplishments ==
- All Elite Wrestling
  - AEW Women's World Championship (2 times) - Storm (1) and Saraya (1)
