= Klondyke Kate =

British professional wrestler

Personal information
- Born: Jayne Porter; 10 May 1962 (age 63) England, United Kingdom

Professional wrestling career
- Ring name: Klondyke Kate
- Billed height: 5 ft 4 in (163 cm)
- Billed weight: 20 st (280 lb; 127 kg)
- Debut: 1977
- Retired: 2011

Jayne Porter (born 10 May 1962) is an English female professional wrestler known by her ring name Klondyke Kate. She wrestled for All Star Wrestling, holding their British Women's Championship, which she won in a match featured in a BBC2 documentary. She also regularly wrestled on Welsh TV station S4C's Reslo wrestling show organised and presented by Orig Williams and managed male opponents of Big Daddy for wrestling shows screened on the two Scottish franchises of the ITV network in October 1990.

== Professional wrestling career ==
In 1977, Porter began wrestling at the age of 14 in Blackpool, answering a crowd challenge. She was trained at the same facility as fellow English wrestler William Regal. Her first match was at a bar with wrestlers The Cherokee Princess and Rusty Blair. Porter wrestled both men and women early in her career. In 1982, she embarked on a tour of Japan.

Porter was involved in the first legal female wrestling in the city of London took place in 1987 at Albert Hall. In 1989, Porter was a part of a BBC2 documentary called Raging Belles from the television show Forty Minutes. The documentary covered Porter defeating Nicky Monroe for the British Women's Championship in All Star Wrestling. In October 1990, Porter appeared at a taping by Joint Promotions for the Grampian and STV regions of ITV in which she was the manager of the teams of Anaconda and Kamikaze plus John Wilkie and Count Von Zuppi, each of which faced Big Daddy and partner Johnny Kidd in two tag team matches. Following defeats in both, Porter herself had a brief post-match altercation with Daddy. She was also a frequent combatant on the Welsh language wrestling show Reslo on the S4C channel.

She is interviewed in Simon Garfield's 1996 (revised reprint 2007) book The Wrestling about the history of British wrestling. Also in 2007, she was played by Miranda Hart in Tim Plester's short film World of Wrestling.

Porter's retirement match was in December 2011 against her daughter Connie Steele. In 2018, she was the first inductee of Pro-Wrestling: EVE's Hall of Fame. She was featured on BBC1's The One Show in January 2019.

== Personal life ==
Porter had six miscarriages and suffered from both anxiety and depression. After landing on her stomach during a match, she discovered she was over eight months pregnant with her son Adam; his father was wrestler Ian Dean. Her daughter Connor is also a professional wrestler known as Connie Steele. Her marriage ended in 2002. She also gave birth to another son in 2003

After retiring from wrestling, Porter worked with disadvantaged youth and became a foster parent. Also, after her weight ballooned to 28 stone, she underwent gastric bypass surgery, losing over 14 stone.

== Championships and accomplishments ==
- All Star Wrestling
  - British Women's Championship (5 times)
- Pro-Wrestling: EVE
  - Hall of Fame (2018)
