= Paige (wrestler) =

British professional wrestler (born 1992)

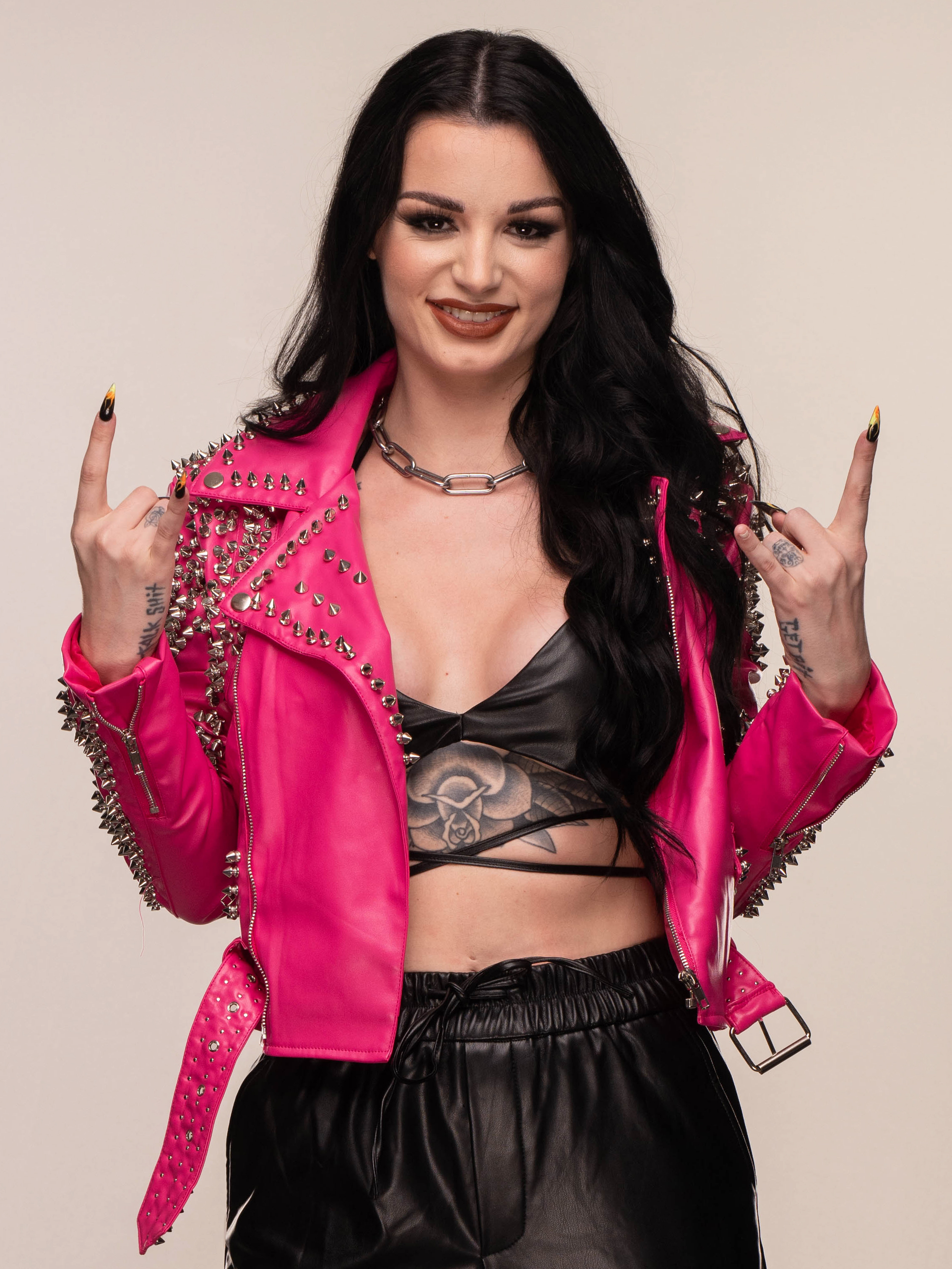
- Bevis in 2022
- Born: Saraya-Jade Bevis; 17 August 1992 (age 34); Norwich, Norfolk, England
- Partner(s): Alberto Del Rio (engaged 2016–2017); Ronnie Radke (2018–2024)
- Parents: Ricky Knight (father); Sweet Saraya (mother)
- Relatives: Zak Zodiac (brother); Roy Bevis (half-brother); Ricky Knight Jr. (nephew)
- Professional wrestling career
- Ring names: Britani Knight; Paige; Saraya
- Billed height: 5 ft 8 in (173 cm)
- Billed weight: 121 lb (55 kg)
- Billed from: Norwich, England
- Trained by: Jason Cross; Ricky Knight; Roy Bevis; Sweet Saraya; Zak Zodiac
- Debut: 8 May 2005

Signature
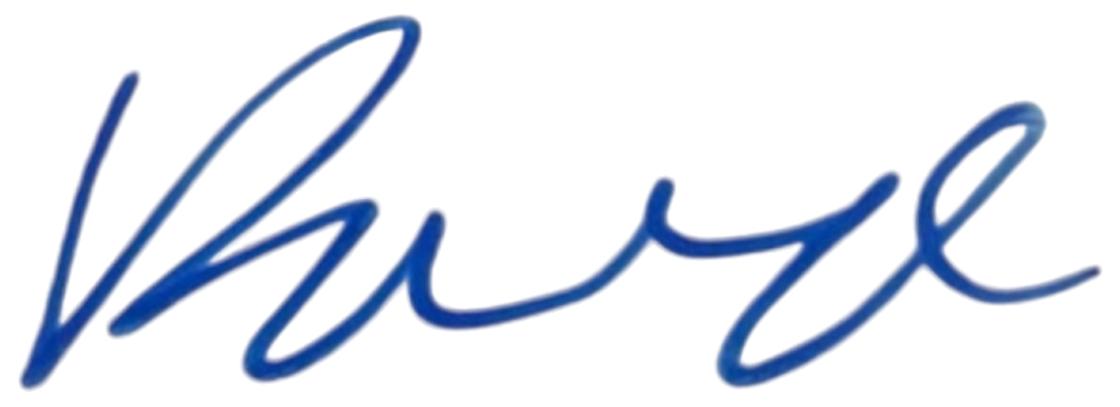

YouTube information
- Channel: Rulebreakers With Saraya
- Years active: 2025–present
- Genre: Podcasting
- Subscribers: 74.7 thousand
- Views: 7.5 million
- Last updated: 1 August 2026

Saraya-Jade Bevis (/səˈreɪə/; born 17 August 1992) is an English professional wrestler and actress. She is signed to WWE, where she performs on the SmackDown brand under the ring name Paige. She is also known for her tenure in All Elite Wrestling (AEW) from 2022 to 2025, where she performed under her real name (stylized mononymously as Saraya).

In 2005, at the age of 13, Bevis made her debut under the ring name Britani Knight for her family's World Association of Wrestling (WAW) promotion. She went on to hold several championships on the European independent circuit. After talent scouting in England, WWE signed Bevis in 2011 and she began wrestling in its developmental systems, debuting in Florida Championship Wrestling (FCW) in 2012 and later going on a winning streak in NXT, culminating in her becoming the inaugural NXT Women's Champion. She made her surprise debut on the main roster in 2014 and immediately won the Divas Championship, making her the youngest Divas Champion and also the youngest female champion in company history at the age of 21. She is also the only woman to hold both a WWE and NXT Women's Championship simultaneously.

In 2015 and 2016, Bevis went on hiatus due to injury, undergoing neck surgery in October 2016. She suffered another neck injury in December 2017 that forced her into retirement. Following her retirement, she remained with WWE as a contributor to WWE-related programs and fulfilled managing roles until her contract with the company expired in July 2022. In September 2022, she signed with AEW and made her debut for the company at Grand Slam Saraya, where she was the leader of The Outcasts stable. In August 2023 at All In, she won the AEW Women's World Championship in London. After her contract with AEW expired in 2025, she returned to WWE as an in-ring performer at WrestleMania 42 in April 2026, where she won the WWE Women's Tag Team Championship with Brie Bella.

In 2012, Channel 4 produced a documentary about Bevis and her family called The Wrestlers: Fighting with My Family, which was later adapted into the biographical sports comedy-drama film Fighting with My Family (2019), starring Florence Pugh as Bevis. She ranked No. 1 in Pro Wrestling Illustrated's Female 50 in 2014, and was named Diva of the Year by Rolling Stone that same year.

== Early life ==
Saraya-Jade Bevis was born in Norwich on 17 August 1992, the daughter of professional wrestlers Julia Hamer-Bevis and Patrick Bevis. Her older brother Zak, older half-brother Roy, and nephew Ricky are also wrestlers. The family runs the World Association of Wrestling (WAW) promotion in Norwich, while her mother also owns and operates the female-only Bellatrix Female Warriors (BFW) promotion in Norwich. Her mother once wrestled while unknowingly seven months pregnant with Bevis.

Bevis grew up in a council house in Norwich, where she attended The Hewett School. As a child, she was scared of wrestling because of the injuries suffered by her family, and instead wanted to become a zoologist. From the age of 10, she would occasionally get in the ring and fight her brothers while her father taught her wrestling moves. Bevis's younger brother died when she was 13. At the age of 15, she started working as a bouncer and bartender at her parents' pub while they were away for wrestling bookings.

In the mid-2020s, Bevis disclosed that during her childhood, she and her brother Zak were sexually abused by a guest staying regularly at their home. Bevis's parents did not know about the abuse, and Bevis herself was not able to process the trauma until a 2021 phone call with Zak. Bevis has stated the trauma of her abuse contributed to drug abuse later in life.

== Professional wrestling career ==
=== Early career (2005–2011) ===
Bevis made her debut in 2005, at the age of 13, when her father, who was running a wrestling show, asked her to replace a wrestler who failed to turn up. Her earliest recorded match was in April 2006 when she, using the ring name Britani Knight, teamed with her mother for a loss in a triple threat tag team match in World Association of Wrestling (WAW). Knight then allied with Melodi to form a tag team called the Norfolk Dolls (based on the movie The California Dolls) and they wrestled in multiple English promotions. The Norfolk Dolls won the new World Association of Women's Wrestling (WAWW) Tag Team Championship in June 2007 by defeating the Legion of Womb, but it became inactive due to no title defences by the Norfolk Dolls.

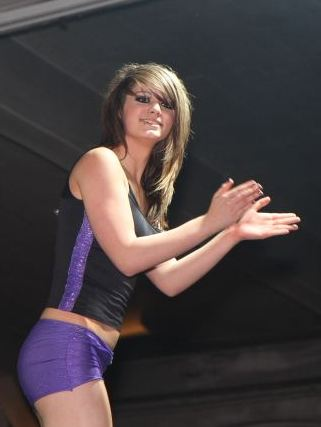
Knight at a Swiss Championship Wrestling event in November 2010

At the age of 14, Knight sent résumés to numerous wrestling promotions around Europe and earned a chance to wrestle in countries like Scotland, Ireland, Wales, Belgium, France, Turkey, Denmark, Norway, and Germany, as well as the United States, managing to travel by herself at 14. She began to compete for singles championships without much initial success. In Scotland, Knight competed for the World Wide Wrestling League (W3L) Women's Title, but lost to Sara in the tournament finals in September 2007. In December 2007, Knight took part in a tournament where the winner would become the first WAWW British Champion, but lost in the finals to Jetta. In 2008, Knight challenged both Sara and Jetta for their respective titles, but failed in her title bids.

Knight went on to achieve more singles success from 2009. In August 2009, Knight defeated her mother Sweet Saraya in a two-out-of-three falls match to capture the vacant Herts and Essex (HEW) Women's Championship. Later that month, Knight once again defeated Saraya to capture the WAWW British Championship. In November 2009, Knight captured the Real Deal Wrestling (RDW) Women's Championship from her mother in an elimination match also featuring Chelsey Love and Stacey Baybie. In December 2009, while in HEW, Knight won the RQW Women's Championship by defeating Jetta in a champion vs. champion match with her HEW Women's Championship on the line. In May 2010, Knight and her mother challenged Amazon and Ananya for the PWF Ladies Tag Team Championship, which they won. On 17 July 2010, Knight lost the HEW Women's Championship to her mother.

On 22 January 2011, Knight captured the German Stampede Wrestling Ladies' Championship from Blue Nikita. Knight also competed at debut show of Turkish Power Wrestling in Ankara in January 2011, with a losing effort against Shanna for the inaugural TPW Ladies Crown. On 11 March, she recaptured the HEW Women's Championship from her mother. Knight returned to Pro-Wrestling: EVE on 8 April to participate in a two-night tournament to crown the first ever Pro-Wrestling: EVE Champion. In the first night, Knight lost a four-way match to Jenny Sjödin, won a Last Chance battle royal, then defeated Sjödin in the quarter-final match. The next day, she defeated Jetta in the semi-final match, and later in the finals defeated Nikki Storm to win the Pro Wrestling: EVE Championship. On 30 April, Knight won the SCW Ladies Championship by defeating champion Amy Cooper. Also in 2011, Knight won an elimination match to become WAWW Hardcore Champion.

On 4 June, Knight lost her Pro-Wrestling: EVE Championship to Jenny Sjödin, and on 26 June, Knight lost her SCW Ladies Championship to her mother during a four-way match also involving Amy Cooper and Laura Wellings. On 2 August, Knight and her mother lost their PWF Ladies Tag Team Championship to Amazon and Destiny in a two-out-of-three falls match. On 12 November, Knight vacated the HEW Women's Championship. Knight also lost the WAWW British Championship to Liberty on 19 November 2011, while also vacating the RQW Women's Championship on that day.

=== Shimmer Women Athletes (2011) ===
Bevis, again billed as Britani Knight, debuted for the American all-female promotion Shimmer Women Athletes on 26 March 2011 at the tapings of Volume 37 in Berwyn, Illinois. Teaming with her mother Saraya Knight, as the Knight Dynasty, they were managed by Rebecca Knox and defeated Nikki Roxx and Ariel via disqualification after the other team used the Dynasty's brass knuckles. This led to the Knight Dynasty receiving Shimmer Tag Team Championship match against the Seven Star Sisters (Hiroyo Matsumoto and Misaki Ohata) at Volume 38, which the Knight Dynasty lost.

In October 2011 at Volume 42, the Knight Dynasty lost another Shimmer Tag Team Championship match against champions Ayako Hamada and Ayumi Kurihara when Saraya refused to help Britani. Saraya then scolded Britani after the match. At Volume 43, Britani lost to Jessie McKay, which was her third consecutive loss. This led to Saraya disowning (in storyline) and slapping Britani, before a brawl between the two ensued and had to be pulled apart. Britani subsequently challenged Saraya to a match at Volume 44, where Britani defeated Saraya under no disqualification rules, in what was her final Shimmer match.

=== WWE (2011–2022) ===
==== Florida Championship Wrestling (2011–2012) ====
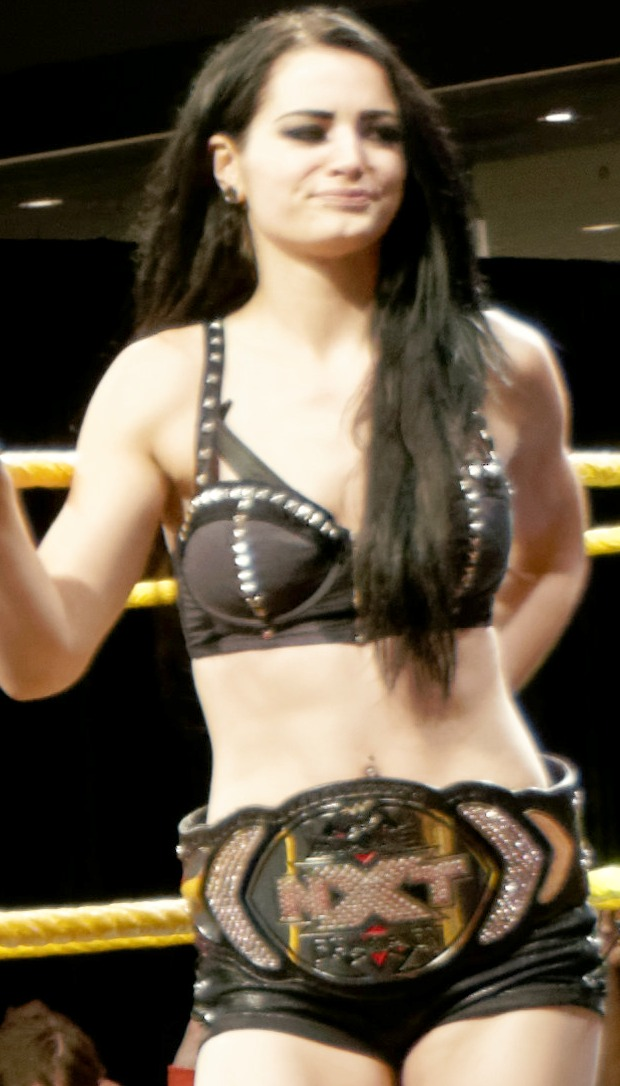
Paige as NXT Women's Champion

Bevis was first informed that there would be try-outs for WWE when a talent scout came to a show in England. She was unsuccessful in her first try in November 2010, but succeeded in April 2011. In September 2011, Bevis signed a contract with WWE and was assigned to its then-developmental territory, Florida Championship Wrestling (FCW). She made her debut for FCW at a house show on 5 January 2012, using the ring name Saraya. Her ring name was then changed to Paige, as she made her televised debut in an appearance on the 26 February episode of FCW TV. Bevis chose the name in homage to Paige Matthews from Charmed, who had "a butt chin like me". From March 2012, Paige formed an alliance with Sofia Cortez, dubbing themselves the "Anti-Diva Army". Paige made her televised in-ring debut in a tag team match alongside Cortez on 19 March, where the duo lost to Audrey Marie and Kaitlyn. Paige and Cortez then formed a brief association with Rick Victor, winning a mixed tag team match against Audrey Marie and Aiden English. On 6 May, Paige pinned the FCW Divas Champion, Raquel Diaz in a non-title triple threat match, which also involved Audrey Marie. This earned Paige a championship match against Diaz on the 27 May episode of FCW TV, where Diaz's chicanery led to Paige being disqualified and Diaz retained her title. Dissension was teased within the Anti-Diva Army as Paige moved on to feud with Audrey Marie. Paige lost to Marie on 11 June on FCW TV after Cortez interfered against her, signalling the end of the alliance. On the final episode of FCW TV on 15 July, Paige and Cortez ended their feud with Marie emerging victorious in a no disqualification match.

==== NXT Women's Champion (2012–2014) ====
WWE went on to rebrand its developmental territory FCW into NXT. Paige's NXT television debut took place on the third episode of the rebooted NXT, taped at Full Sail University, in which she lost to Sofia Cortez. From September 2012, after gaining a large surge in crowd support Paige went on a winning streak defeating the likes of Audrey Marie, Sasha Banks, Emma, Aksana, and multiple victories over Alicia Fox.

On 30 January 2013, Paige was assaulted by ring announcer Summer Rae, due to Rae's jealousy of Paige's popularity and success. On 13 February episode of NXT, Paige suffered a shoulder injury after brawling with Rae, which Rae exploited later that episode to end Paige's undefeated streak. After Paige continued to confront Rae, Paige defeated Rae in a singles match, despite Rae's pre-match attack, on 1 May episode of NXT. In June, Paige entered a tournament to determine the first NXT Women's Champion. She defeated Tamina Snuka and Alicia Fox en route to the final, in which she defeated Emma to become the inaugural champion (the episode aired on tape delay on 24 July 2013, the day WWE officially begins her reign).

Paige made her first successful title defence on 14 August episode of NXT, defeating Summer Rae. In the following months, Paige teamed up with Emma to feud with Summer Rae and Sasha Banks. Paige successfully defended her title against Natalya on 4 December episode of NXT, and against Emma on 27 February 2014 at NXT Arrival. On 24 April, Paige was forced to vacate her NXT Women's Championship and not defend it again (ending her reign at 301 days) due to winning the Divas Championship.

==== Divas Champion (2014–2015) ====
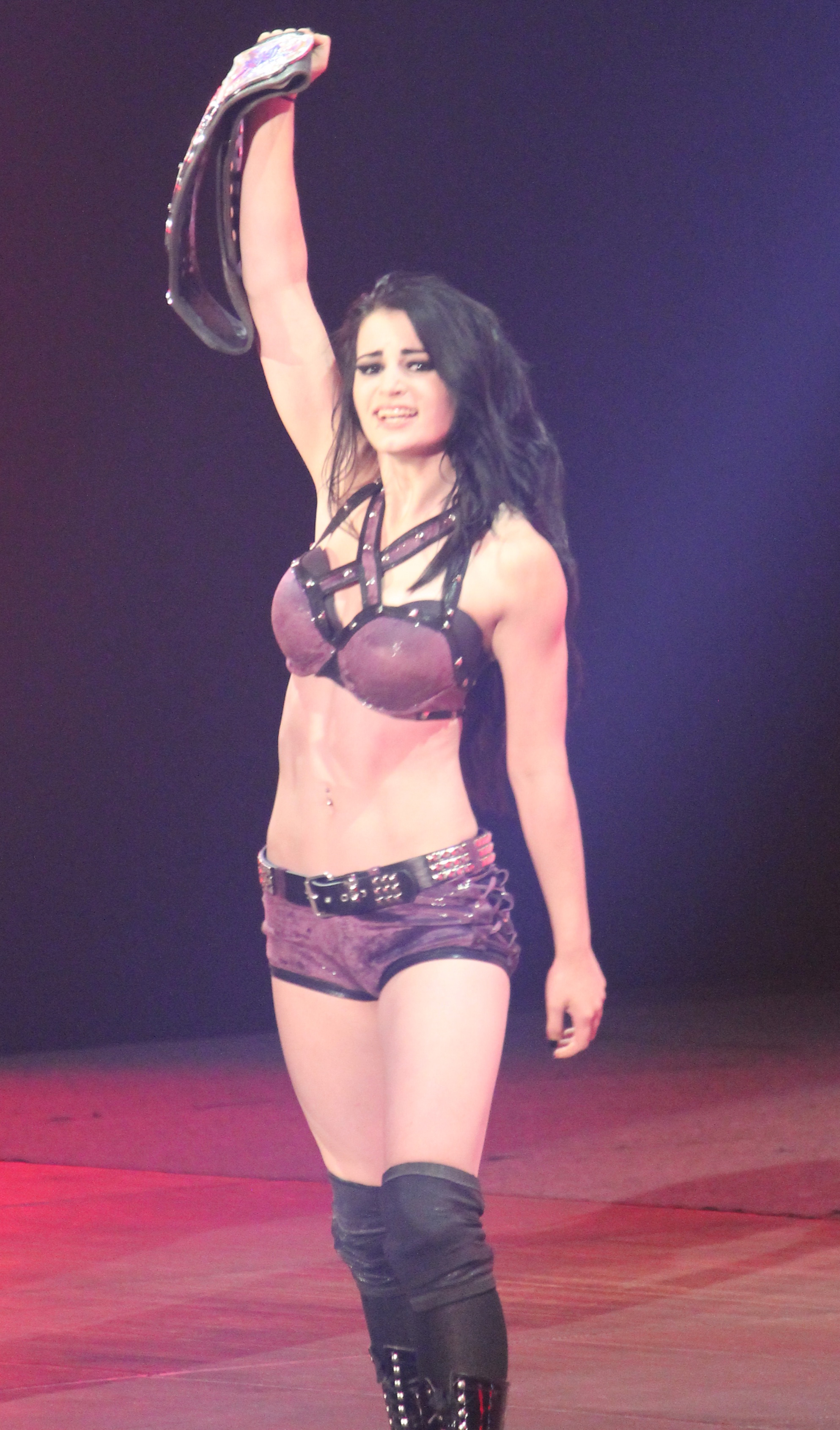
Paige after winning the WWE Divas Championship in her main roster debut in April 2014

Paige surprisingly made her main roster debut on 7 April 2014 episode of Raw, the night after WrestleMania XXX, congratulating Divas Champion AJ Lee on her successful title defence at the pay-per-view event, after which AJ slapped Paige, challenging her to an impromptu match for the championship, which Paige quickly won using one of her signature moves, the "Paige-turner", making her the youngest Divas Champion in history at the age of 21, the first Diva to win the title in her debut match and the only woman to hold both Divas and NXT Women's Championships at the same time. Paige had her first successful title defence on 28 April episode of Raw in an impromptu match against Brie Bella, which went to a no contest due to Kane attacking Brie, as Paige escaped. In her first successful title defence on pay-per-view, Paige defeated Tamina Snuka on 4 May at Extreme Rules.

Paige suffered her first defeat on the main roster on 19 May episode of Raw against Alicia Fox in a non-title match, which led to a title match between the two at Payback, where Paige prevailed. In June, Paige started a feud with Cameron and defeated her in two non-title matches. However, Cameron's tag team partner Naomi went on to defeat Paige in a non-title match and was granted a title match at Money in the Bank, which Paige won. During this time, WWE was criticised for failing to develop Paige's character despite being able to do so for Paige's opponents and for portraying Paige as a vulnerable champion while she was proving herself in the storyline.

On the post-Money in the Bank episode of Raw on 30 June, a role reversal occurred when a returning AJ Lee quickly defeated Paige in a title match to regain the Divas Championship, in which Paige was initially reluctant to face Lee, but she then agreed to the match per request of the live audience. Despite the championship loss, Paige acted as if she were best friends with Lee during tag matches in which they teamed together. At Battleground, Paige lost a rematch for the Divas Championship to Lee. On the post-Battleground episode of Raw on 21 July, after Paige and Lee won a tag match against Emma and Natalya, Paige turned heel after viciously assaulting Lee. This eventually set up another title match between the two on 17 August, Paige's 22nd birthday, at SummerSlam, which Paige won to capture her second Divas Championship. A month later at Night of Champions, Paige lost the title back to Lee in a triple threat match which also involved Nikki Bella. Paige then formed an alliance with Alicia Fox while still feuding with Lee but after Fox failed to secure Paige a victory in another title match against Lee at Hell in a Cell, Paige dissolved their alliance by attacking Fox the following night on Raw. At Survivor Series, Paige participated in a 4-on-4 elimination tag team match where she was the last person from her team to be eliminated, courtesy of Naomi.

On 5 January 2015 episode of Raw, Paige became a fan favourite again as she rescued Natalya from a post-match assault by Divas Champion Nikki Bella which led to a non-title match between the two the following night on Main Event, which Paige won. This led to a tag team match between Paige and Natalya against The Bella Twins at the Royal Rumble, which The Bella Twins won. Following weeks of being tormented by The Bella Twins, Paige unsuccessfully challenged Nikki for the Divas Championship at Fastlane and on 2 March episode of Raw, after which, the returning AJ Lee saved Paige from a post-match attack by The Bellas. This led to a tag team match at WrestleMania 31 between Paige and Lee against The Bella Twins, which Paige and Lee won in Paige's WrestleMania début. On 13 April episode of Raw, Paige won a battle royal to become the number one contender to Nikki Bella's Divas Championship and was attacked after the match by Naomi, who injured her in the storyline and made her unable to compete. Paige returned on 18 May episode of Raw, after a one-month absence, saving Nikki Bella from an attack by Naomi and Tamina Snuka, before attacking Bella as well. This prompted a triple threat match between Paige, Naomi and Nikki at Elimination Chamber, which Paige lost. In June, Paige went on to unsuccessfully challenge Nikki for the championship in two singles matches on Raw and Money in the Bank, after Nikki and Brie switched places and in a triple threat match on 4 July at The Beast in the East, which also involved Tamina.

==== Women's Revolution (2015–2016) ====
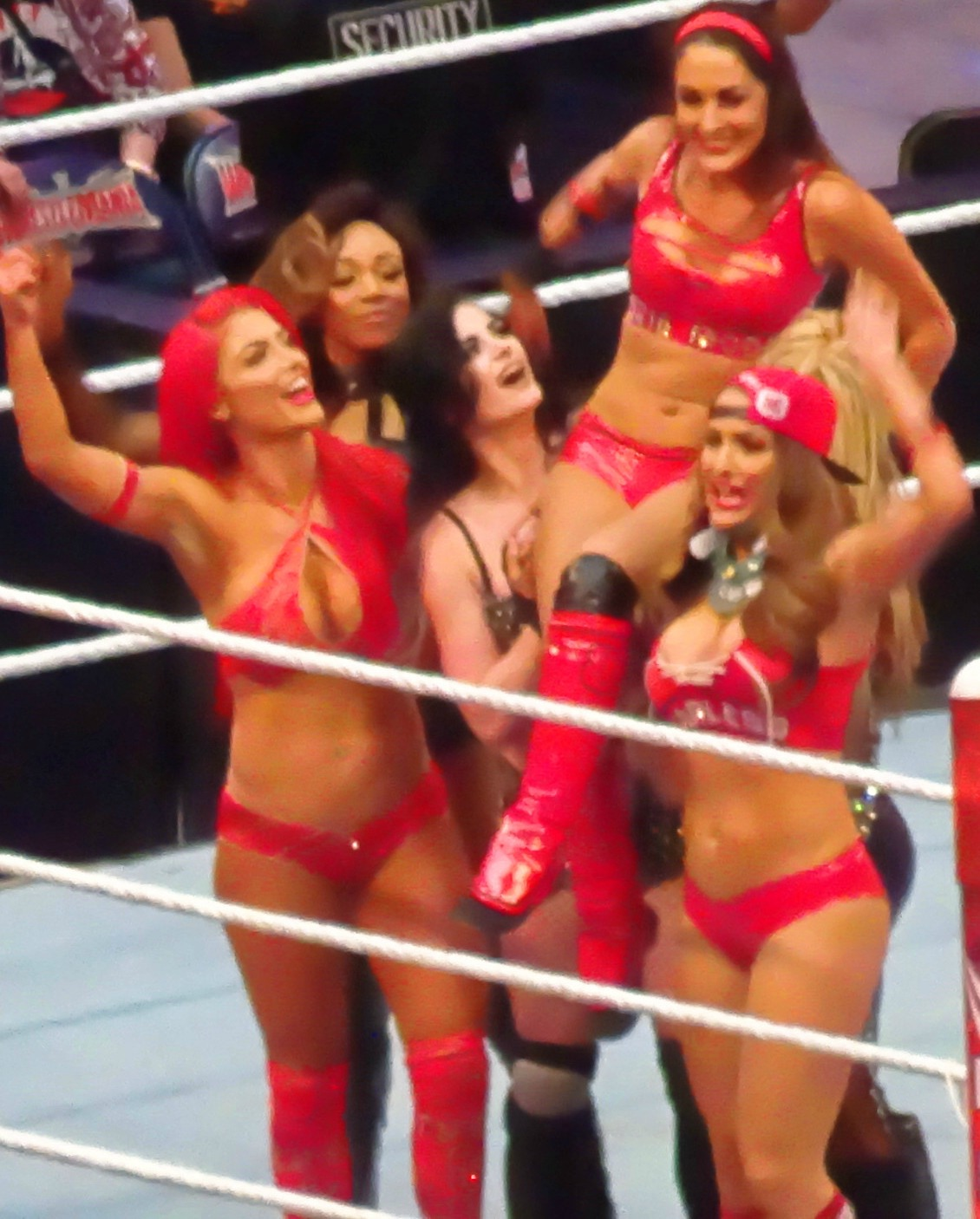
Paige (middle) celebrating with her fellow Total Divas co-stars after their victory at WrestleMania 32 in April 2016

On 13 July episode of Raw, after weeks of being outnumbered by The Bella Twins and their ally Alicia Fox, Stephanie McMahon called for a "revolution" in the Divas division, introducing the débuting Charlotte and Becky Lynch as Paige's allies and NXT Women's Champion Sasha Banks as an ally of Naomi and Tamina, which led to a brawl between the three teams. The trio of Paige, Charlotte and Becky, originally dubbed "Submission Sorority", was renamed "Team PCB", after the first-name initials of each wrestler. The three teams would ultimately face off at SummerSlam in a three-team elimination match, which PCB won after Becky Lynch pinned Brie Bella. On 31 August episode of Raw, all members of PCB competed in the first ever "Divas beat the clock challenge", but Charlotte was named number one contender for the Divas Championship, as Paige fought Sasha Banks to a time limit draw. This led to two matches between Paige and Banks on the 7 and 14 September episodes of Raw, which Banks won, and on 10 September episode of SmackDown, where the two fought to a no contest.

Charlotte won the Divas Championship from Nikki Bella on 20 September at Night of Champions, and during her celebration the following night on Raw, Paige turned on her partners and cut a worked shoot promo, where she claimed Charlotte was only there because of her father and berated other members of the Divas division, including Becky and Natalya. This also led to Paige having multiple confrontations with Natalya. Throughout October, Paige acted as if she wanted to reconcile with Becky and Charlotte, only to attack them. In November, Paige became the new number one contender for Charlotte's Divas Championship after winning a fatal four-way match, but was unsuccessful in regaining the title on three occasions: at Survivor Series, when she lost by submission, the following night on Raw in a rematch, which ended in a double countout, and at TLC, when she once again lost.

Paige took some time off television after her rivalry with Charlotte due to injury, she returned on 18 January episode of Raw as a babyface accompanying her former rival Natalya to her match against Brie Bella. Upon her return, Paige started competing in various singles and tag team matches, ending on both winning and losing sides. Paige then aligned herself with fellow Total Divas cast members Brie Bella, Natalya, Alicia Fox and Eva Marie, facing Lana, Naomi, Tamina, Summer Rae and Emma in a 10-Diva tag team match on the WrestleMania 32 kick-off show, in which Paige's team emerged victorious. After defeating WWE Women's Champion Charlotte on two occasions, Paige was granted a title match on 20 June episode of Raw, where she failed to capture the title, and would be attacked by Charlotte and her accomplice Dana Brooke post-match, before being saved by Sasha Banks. This led to a tag team match the following week on 27 June episode of Raw, where Paige and Banks scored the victory.

==== Neck injuries and first retirement (2016–2018) ====
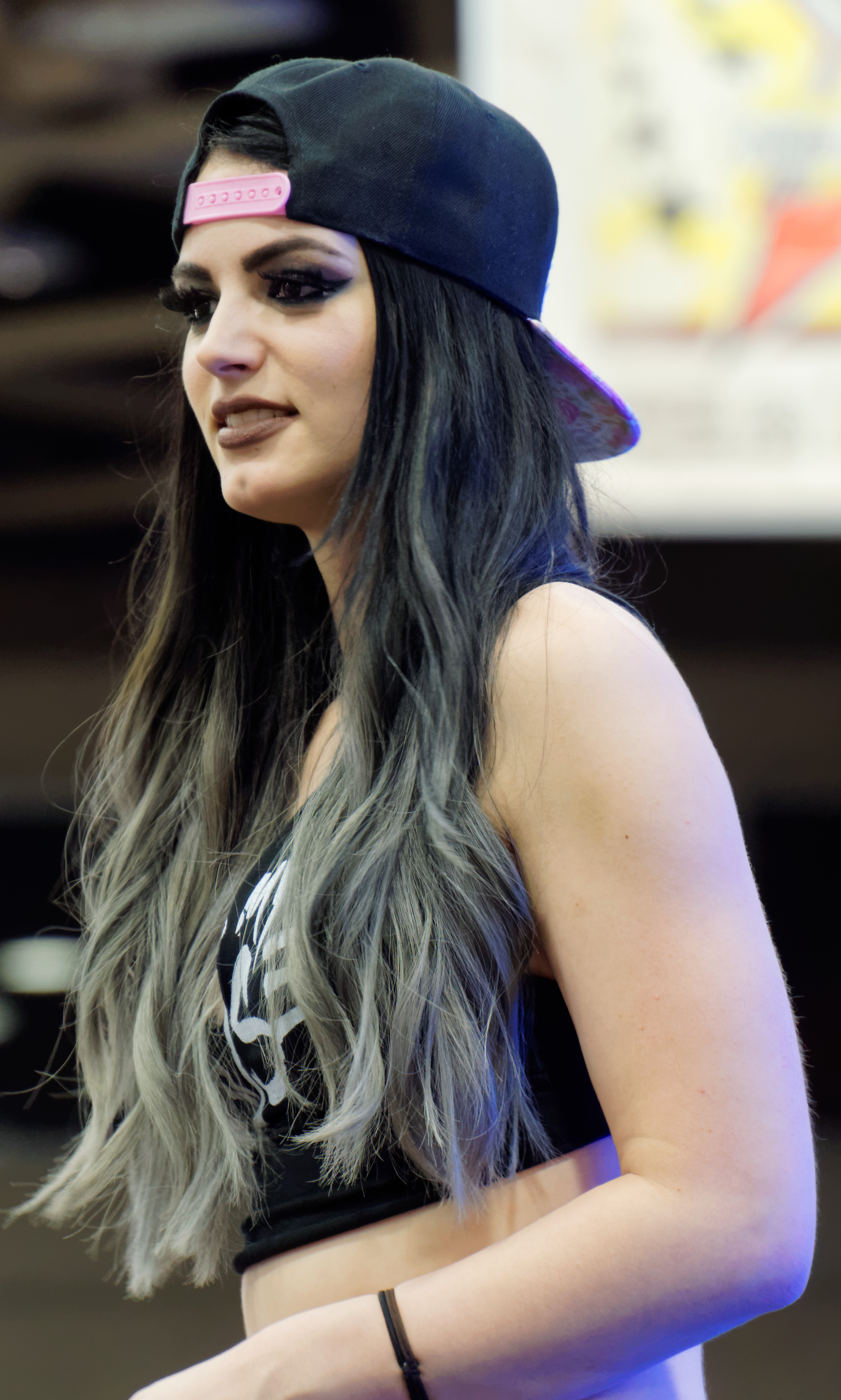
Bevis at WrestleMania Axxess in 2016

As part of the 2016 WWE draft which took place on 19 July, Paige was drafted to Raw. On 3 August, her mother revealed on Twitter that she was on a hiatus due to a neck injury. On 17 August, Paige was suspended for 30 days after violating the company's wellness policy. She later explained that she had not failed a drug test, but that the suspension was due to a procedural issue. In September 2016, Paige revealed that she would be undergoing neck surgery and would not be wrestling for an undisclosed amount of time. On 10 October, Paige was suspended again for her second violation of the wellness policy; this time for 60 days. Bevis subsequently tweeted, "Same shit different day. Kids..Please don't get prescriptions or doctors notes. Not acceptable". Her father released a statement saying she had been prescribed medication for her neck injury. However, WWE issued a statement, saying that she had "tested positive for an illegal substance, not a prescription drug". On 19 October, she underwent successful neck surgery and was cleared to return to in-ring competition in September 2017.

On 20 November 2017, Paige returned on Raw as a heel to attack Sasha Banks, Bayley, Mickie James and Raw Women's Champion Alexa Bliss. Paige was joined in her attack by the debuting Mandy Rose and Sonya Deville, with whom she formed the stable Absolution. Paige returned to in-ring action in her first match since June 2016 on 4 December episode of Raw, defeating Sasha Banks. Later in the night, the group attacked Alicia Fox. At a house show on 27 December, Paige suffered another neck injury after taking a kick from Sasha Banks in a six-woman tag team match, thus forcing the referee to stop the match. The injury kept her from competing at the Royal Rumble. Paige continued to accompany her fellow Absolution members in their matches; but did not return to in-ring competition. During the WrestleMania 34 kick-off show, Paige made a cameo appearance as part of the commentary team for the first ever WrestleMania Women's Battle Royal. On the post-Wrestlemania episode of Raw on 9 April, Paige officially retired from in-ring competition due to her December 2017 neck injury.

==== Non-wrestling roles (2018–2022) ====
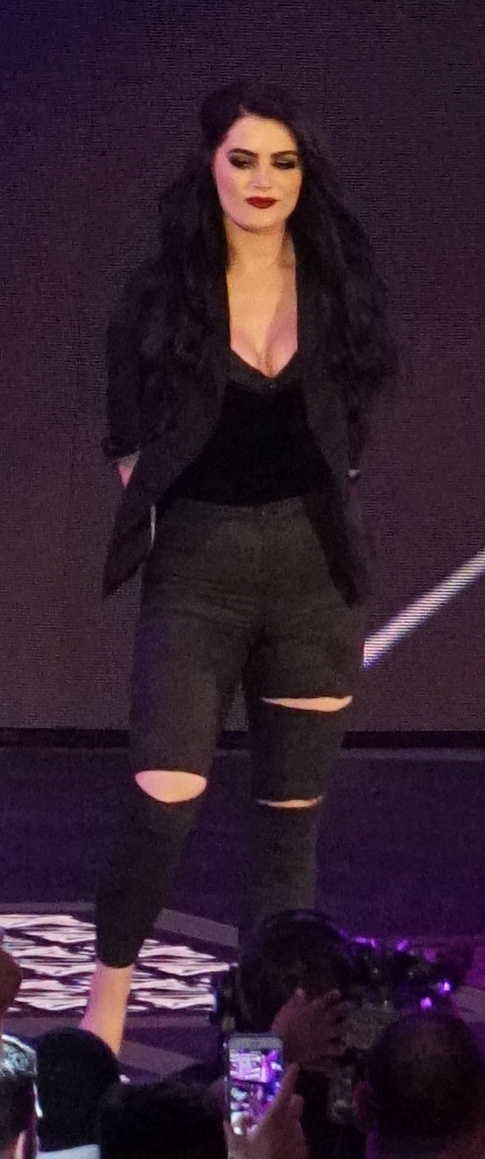
Bevis at WWE Smackdown Live in 2018

The day after revealing her in-ring retirement, on 10 April 2018 episode of SmackDown Live, Paige was announced by Shane McMahon (acting as the commissioner of the show) as the new general manager of SmackDown, turning her face once again and disbanding Absolution in the process. WWE Chairman Vince McMahon reportedly gave Paige this role to keep her on television to promote the film Fighting with My Family, which is based on her life. Paige retained the position throughout the rest of the year until the McMahon family announced that starting that night they are taking charge and the general manager position was quietly removed on 17 December episode of Raw. The following night on SmackDown, Shane McMahon confirmed that Paige is to remain around the show but not in the same position.

After spending some weeks away to promote the film Fighting with My Family, Paige made a backstage appearance on 9 April 2019 episode of SmackDown, where she announced that she would be bringing a new tag team to the division to feud with The IIconics (Billie Kay and Peyton Royce) for their WWE Women's Tag Team Championship. A week later, Paige began managing the newly formed team of Asuka and new SmackDown draftee Kairi Sane called the Kabuki Warriors. The duo would initially be unsuccessful; however, while Paige was on an off-screen hiatus due to undergoing neck surgery, the duo would turn heel and capture the titles on 6 October at Hell in a Cell. When Paige came back to congratulate them on 28 October, episode of Raw, the duo turned on her, with Asuka spraying Paige's face with green mist, effectively severing ties with her. She then became a contributor for WWE's studio show WWE Backstage, which premiered on 5 November on FS1.

Paige returned to SmackDown via Skype on 20 March 2020, to confront SmackDown Women's Champion Bayley and Sasha Banks, where she announced that Bayley would defend her title in a six-way elimination match at WrestleMania 36 (though changed to five-way after Dana Brooke was removed from the match).

In 2021, Paige was ranked No. 17 on WWE's list of The 50 Greatest Women Superstars of all time.

On 10 June 2022, Paige announced her departure from WWE, effective 7 July when her contract would expire, ending her near 11 year tenure with the company.

=== All Elite Wrestling (2022–2025) ===
On 21 September 2022, Saraya made her debut for AEW at Grand Slam in Queens, New York. On 5 October episode of AEW Dynamite, Saraya had a confrontation with Dr. Britt Baker, D.M.D. which led to a physical fight, marking the first time Saraya has gotten physical in wrestling since her December 2017 neck injury. On 9 November episode of Dynamite, Saraya announced she was 100% cleared to return to the ring and would wrestle her first match, since 2017, against Baker at Full Gear where Saraya defeated Baker.

Saraya had her second match on 11 January 2023, on AEW Dynamite where she teamed with Toni Storm in a losing effort to Dr. Britt Baker D.M.D. and the AEW Women's World Champion Jamie Hayter. The following week, Saraya and Storm turned heel as they attacked Willow Nightingale and began slating the AEW homegrown talent. On 5 March at AEW Revolution, Saraya faced Ruby Soho and Hayter for the AEW Women's World Championship where Hayter picked up the win. After the match, Soho attacked Hayter and Baker officially aligning with Saraya and Storm. On 10 March, the group became officially known as "The Outcasts". Over the next month, they continued a winning streak against the homegrown talent, while humiliating them with their signature branding.

On 27 August, Saraya won her first world title in nearly nine years by defeating AEW Women's World Champion Hikaru Shida, Britt Baker and Outcast stablemate Toni Storm in a four-way match at All In in her home country. On 20 September at Grand Slam, Saraya successfully defended her AEW Women's World Championship against Toni Storm. Saraya lost the title to Shida on 10 October episode of Dynamite Title Tuesday, ending her reign at 44 days.

In late 2023, Saraya started to intervene in Cool Hand Ang and Soho's budding relationship after it was revealed he was her secret admirer. Throughout the weeks she went above and beyond to continue and keep them separated. Saraya added Harley Cameron to the Outcasts as her puppet. Cameron kissed Parker behind Soho's back which Saraya was revealed to be the brains behind the operation. On 9 February 2024, Ruby Soho teamed with Saraya against Kris Statlander and Willow Nightingale in a losing effort when Soho left Saraya before the match ended. The feud came to an abrupt end when Soho revealed she was legitimately pregnant and would be going on maternity leave.

Saraya would interrupt the pre-show of All In with her entire family claiming to be neglected over the past year. Jamie Hayter would return after over a year away to run through the entire group. Over the next month they feuded with Saraya consistently using Cameron as a shield to run away. At Collision Grand Slam, Saraya created a match stipulation, Saraya's Rules Match, where all the rules were in her favour. Despite the odds, Saraya would still lose to Hayter at the event. At Title Tuesday on 8 October, Saraya participated in a four-way match, for a match against Mariah May at WrestleDream for the AEW Women's World Championship, which was won by Willow Nightingale. This would end up being Saraya's final appearance in AEW. In a November 2024 interview with The Buzz, Saraya announced that she would be taking a hiatus from wrestling to focus on other projects. On 26 March 2025, Saraya announced her departure from AEW, ending her near three-year tenure with the promotion.

=== Return to WWE (2026–present) ===
On 18 April 2026, Bevis, once again competing as Paige, returned to WWE at WrestleMania 42, in her first match in WWE since December 2017, teaming with Brie Bella to replace an injured Nikki Bella in the WWE Women's Tag Team Championship match, winning the title. At Saturday Night's Main Event XLIV on 23 May, Paige and Brie retained the titles against The Irresistible Forces (Lash Legend and Nia Jax). On July 18 at Saturday Night's Main Event XLV, Paige and Brie lost the WWE Women's Tag Team Championship to Fatal Influence (Fallon Henley and Lainey Reid), ending their reign at 91 days. At Night 1 of SummerSlam on 1 August, Paige and The Bella Twins lost to Fatal Influence in a Six-Woman Tag Team Match. After the match The Bella Twins attacked Paige.

== Other media ==
In July 2012, Channel 4 produced a documentary about Bevis and her family titled The Wrestlers: Fighting with My Family. The documentary was adapted into the 2019 feature film Fighting with My Family, with Florence Pugh playing Bevis.

On 19 March 2023, Bevis was the subject of an episode of Biography: WWE Legends.

On 25 March 2025, Bevis released her biography Hell in Boots, a reference to the nickname bestowed upon her by fellow British Wrestling legend William Regal.

In October 2014, Bevis joined the cast of Total Divas, a reality television show produced by WWE and E!, for the second part of the show's third season, which began airing in 2015. Bevis guest starred on 14 January 2016 episode of the MTV series Ridiculousness. She appeared alongside Natalya, Brie Bella, and the Chrisley family on the 88th Academy Awards edition of E! Countdown to the Red Carpet on 28 February.

In March 2015, Bevis was featured in Smosh's 131st installment of Game Bang, along with Xavier Woods, Seth Rollins, and Daniel Bryan. Bevis frequently appears at Wizard World comic con events across the United States, hosting fan signings, photo ops, and Q&A sessions. In June 2015, Bevis became one of the judges on the sixth season of Tough Enough. Before the show started, Paige predicted that she would fulfill a role similar to Simon Cowell as a judge. On 3 August 2015, Bevis was a guest on Stone Cold Steve Austin's Stone Cold Podcast, which aired on the WWE Network. She was a guest on Conan on 22 October.

Bevis has appeared in two WWE Studios films; Santa's Little Helper, released in November 2015, and Scooby-Doo! and WWE: Curse of the Speed Demon, in which she provided a voice role and was released in July 2016. She provided a voice role in the WWE Studios and Sony Pictures Animation film Surf's Up 2: WaveMania, which was released in 2017.

Bevis was featured in the WWE Network special WWE Chronicle that premiered on 26 January 2019.

== Filmography ==
Film
Year	Title	Role	Notes
2015	Santa's Little Helper	Eleanor	USA TV movie
2016	Scooby-Doo! and WWE: Curse of the Speed Demon	Herself	Voice performance Straight-to-DVD
2017	Surf's Up 2: WaveMania	Paige	Voice performance Straight-to-DVD
2019	Tables	Herself	Short film
2019	Fighting with My Family	Cameo	Uncredited
Television
Year	Title	Role	Notes
2012	The Wrestlers: Fighting With My Family	Herself	Documentary
2013	The JBL & Cole Show with Renee Young	Herself	Guest, 1 episode
2015	Smosh	Herself	Guest, 1 episode
2015	WWE Tough Enough	Judge	Season 6
2015	Stone Cold Podcast	Herself	Guest, 1 Episode
2015	Conan	Herself	Season 5, Episode 155
2015	Swerved	Herself	Main cast, 5 Episodes
2015–2019	Total Divas	Herself	Main cast (seasons 3–6; 8); Guest (season 9)
2016	This Morning	Herself	Guest, 1 Episode
2016	Ridiculousness	Herself	Season 7, episode 12
2016	Live from E!	Herself	Guest 1, Episode
2016	Ride Along	Herself	Guest, 1 Episode
2016	WWE Game Night	Herself	Contestant, 1 episode
2018–2019	Total Bellas	Herself	Guest (seasons 3 & 4), 3 episodes
2018–2019	Miz & Mrs.	Herself	Episode: "Proud Papa"
2019	What Just Happened??! with Fred Savage	Herself	Episode: "Havenbrook"
2019	WWE Chronicle	Herself	Guest, 1 Episode
2019	Collider Live	Herself	Guest, 1 Episode
2019	The Rich Eisen Show	Herself	Guest, 1 Episode
2019	Celebrity Page	Herself	Guest, 1 Episode
2019	The One Show	Herself	Guest, 1 Episode
2019	The Real	Herself	Guest, 1 Episode
2019	A Family's Passion: Making of "Fighting with My Family"	Herself	Documentary
2019	Page Six TV	Herself	Guest, 1 Episode
2019	IMDb Originals	Herself	Guest, 1 Episode
2019–2020	WWE Backstage	Herself	Contributor
2020	Good Morning Britain	Herself	Guest, 1 Episode
2020	A Little Late with Lily Singh	Herself	Guest, 1 Episode
2020	Fridge Tours	Herself	Guest, 1 Episode (webseries)
2020	WWE's The Bump	Herself	Guest, 1 episode
2023	AEW All Access	Herself	Main cast
2023	Hey! (EW)	Herself	Guest, 1 episode
2023	Biography: WWE Legends	Herself	Season 3, Episode 6
2023	Snacked	Herself	Guest, 1 episode
2024	11th Annual American Reality Television Awards	Herself	TV special
2024	Dinner and a Movie	Herself	Season 1, Episode 3
2025	Tamron Hall	Herself	Guest, 1 Episode
2026	Unwell: Winter Games	Herself	Contestant
2026	What's Your Story?	Herself	Guest. 1 Episode
2026	WWE Unreal	Herself	Main cast (season 3) scenes deleted

Music videos
Year	Title	Artist	Role
2021	I'm Not a Vampire (Revamped)	Falling in Reverse	Cameo
2024	All My Life	Falling in Reverse	Bartender

Video games
Year	Title	Notes	Ref.
2014	WWE Supercard	Video game debut	
2014	WWE 2K15	Included in the "2K Showcase Season Pass" Program as DLC (Excepting Microsoft Windows version)	
2015	WWE Immortals		
2015	WWE 2K16		
2016	WWE 2K17		
2017	WWE Champions		
2017	WWE Tap Mania		
2017	WWE 2K18		
2017	WWE Mayhem		
2018	WWE 2K19		
2019	WWE Universe		
2019	WWE 2K20		
2020	WWE 2K Battlegrounds	Available in a post-launch update as DLC	

== Bibliography ==
- Hell in Boots: Clawing My Way Through Nine Lives (Gallery Books, 2025, Hardcover) ISBN 1-66802-784-4, ISBN 978-1668027844

== Business ventures ==
In September 2015, Bevis co-launched a coffee company called The Dark Gypsy with Blackcraft Cult clothing company owners Bobby Schubenski and Jim Somers. However, in October 2016, Bevis tweeted that she was no longer affiliated with the company.

In December 2017, Paige launched an online clothing store under her real name, Saraya. She also announced that she would extend her brand to a brick and mortar store. On 26 February 2018, she held the grand opening of The Saraya Store in Anaheim, California. Soon after, Saraya Jade Cosmetics, a makeup line, was introduced. Saraya Jade Cosmetics launched on 16 November 2018. In 2019, she partnered with Hot Topic to launch an exclusive makeup collection.

== Personal life ==
Bevis resides in Los Angeles and previously lived in Orlando, Florida.

On a 2015 episode of the WWE reality television show Total Divas, Bevis acknowledged having previously "been with another woman". She was engaged to American musician Kevin Skaff, the guitarist of A Day to Remember, in early 2016; they split up at an unknown date. She became engaged to Mexican wrestler Alberto Del Rio in October 2016; they were reportedly set to marry in March 2017, but ended their relationship in late 2017. From 2018 to December 2024, Bevis was in a relationship with American musician Ronnie Radke, the lead singer of Falling in Reverse. She appeared in two Falling in Reverse music videos and performed backing vocals on their song "Bad Guy".

Bevis cites "Stone Cold" Steve Austin, Alundra Blayze, Edge, Bret Hart, Lita, Bull Nakano, and Rikishi as some of her favourite wrestlers. She has scoliosis but was unaware that she had the condition until after signing with WWE, when a trainer noticed that her back looked "wrong". During her time in NXT, she was in a car accident and required surgery. She has several tattoos, one of which is dedicated to her younger brother who died when she was 13.

In March 2017, private nude photos and sex tapes from 2013 featuring Bevis with fellow wrestlers Brad Maddox (her then-boyfriend) and Xavier Woods were leaked online. She responded that she was "looking into the future and being happy" and that she was hoping her "mistake could help people's future[s]". She later revealed that she suffered from "stress-induced anorexia" and considered suicide due to the incident.

== Championships and accomplishments ==
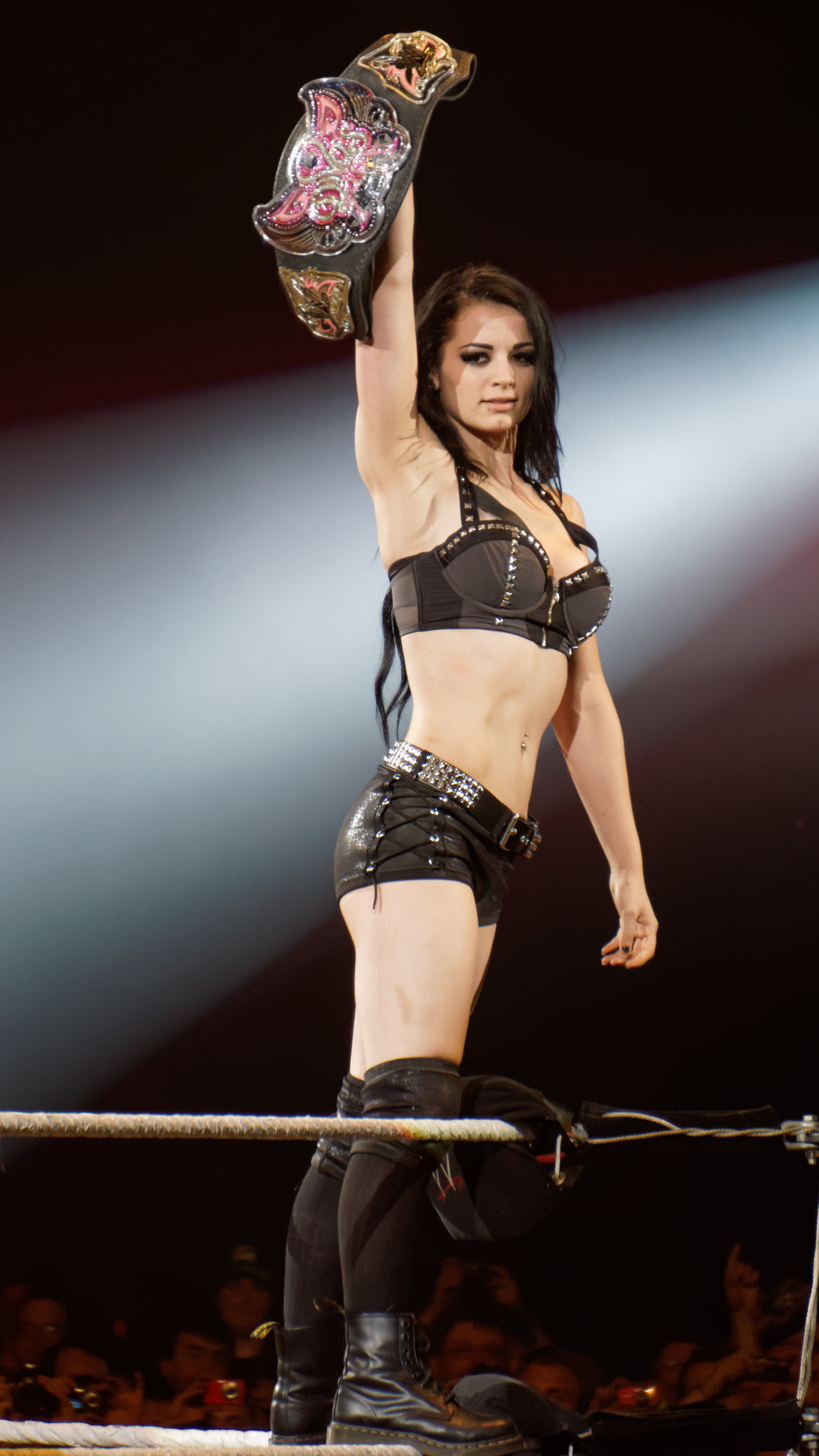
Paige is a two-time (and the youngest) WWE Divas Champion...

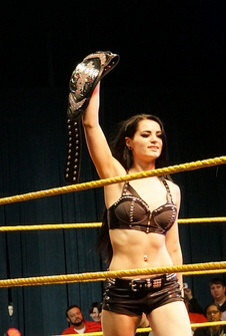
... and the inaugural NXT Women's Champion, at one point holding both titles simultaneously...

- All Elite Wrestling
  - AEW Women's World Championship (1 time)
  - AEW Women's World Championship Qualifier Tournament (2023)
- German Stampede Wrestling
  - GSW Ladies Championship (1 time)
- Herts & Essex Wrestling
  - HEW Women's Championship (2 times)
- Premier Wrestling Federation
  - PWF Ladies Tag Team Championship (1 time) – with Sweet Saraya
- Pro-Wrestling: EVE
  - Pro-Wrestling: EVE Championship (1 time, inaugural)
- Pro Wrestling Illustrated
  - Ranked No. 1 of the top 50 female wrestlers in the PWI Female 50 in 2014, and No. 2 in 2015
- Real Deal Wrestling
  - RDW Women's Championship (1 time)
- Real Quality Wrestling
  - RQW Women's Championship (1 time)
- Rolling Stone
  - Diva of the Year (2014)
- Swiss Championship Wrestling
  - SCW Ladies Championship (1 time)
- World Association of Women's Wrestling
  - WAWW British Ladies Championship (1 time)
  - WAWW British Tag Team Championship (1 time) – with Melodi
  - WAWW Ladies Hardcore Championship (1 time)
- Wrestling Observer Newsletter
  - Worst Feud of the Year (2015) Team PCB vs. Team B.A.D. vs. Team Bella
- WWE
  - WWE Divas Championship (2 times)
  - NXT Women's Championship (1 time, inaugural)
  - WWE Women's Tag Team Championship (1 time) – with Brie Bella
  - NXT Women's Championship Tournament (2013)
  - WWE Year-End Award (1 time)
    - General Manager of the Year (2018)
