= World Association of Wrestling =

British independent professional wrestling promotion

- Acronym: WAW
- Founded: 1994
- Style: Professional wrestling Sports entertainment
- Headquarters: Norwich, Norfolk
- Founder(s): Ricky Knight; Sweet Saraya; Jimmy Ocean
- Owner(s): Ricky Knight; Sweet Saraya; Zak Knight
- Sister: Bellatrix Female Warriors
- Website: https://wawuk.com/

World Association of Wrestling (WAW) is a British independent professional wrestling promotion founded by Ricky Knight, Sweet Saraya, and Jimmy Ocean in 1994 in Norwich, England. It is affiliated with the all-female promotion Bellatrix Female Warriors which is also owned by Saraya Knight. The promotion features British-style wrestling and uses British rules.

== History ==
Ricky Knight, Sweet Saraya, and Jimmy Ocean formed WAW in 1994 in Norwich. Ocean left the business after approximately one year. In 2005, Ricky Knight and Sweet Saraya formed the World Association of Women's Wrestling, although the name was later changed to Bellatrix Female Warriors.

In 2014, WAW ran more than 100 shows. In September 2016, WAW began airing on Mustard TV. American wrestler Scott Hall was previously a backstage agent for the promotion, working behind the scenes at television tapings and appeared in an on-screen authority role as WAW Commissioner.

The promotion was featured in the 2012 Channel 4 documentary The Wrestlers: Fighting with My Family about the Knight family. It was featured in the film Fighting with My Family, which was based on the documentary.

Former Norwich City striker Grant Holt and 2012 Olympics boxing bronze medallist Anthony Ogogo both began their wrestling careers with WAW.

In 2020, WAW was featured in another documentary, this time on BBC Three. A four-part series, Step Into The Ring followed the lives of five young wrestlers battling against physical and mental health issues to pursue professional careers under the guidance of Zak Knight.

== WAW Academy ==
The promotion also includes a wrestling school, The WAW Academy. Trainees perform for both WAW and Bellatrix Female Warriors. The academy trains wrestlers of all ages, including children. Interest in the school increased after Ricky Knight and Sweet Saraya's daughter Saraya-Jade was signed by the WWE in 2011. Zak Knight and Sweet Saraya are the head trainers at the academy, but they also bring in guest trainers, as well. Past guest trainers have included Scott Hall, Dave Taylor, Mr. Anderson, Steve Grey, Mal Sanders, Marty Jones, Jonny Storm, Dean Allmark, and more.

== Championships ==
=== Current ===
Championship	Champion(s)	Previous	Date won	Days	Reference
WAW World Heavyweight Championship	RKJ	Swede	12 April 2025	358+	
WAW World Tag Team Championship	The Staff (Mr. Hayward & Sir Ryan Matthews)	Vacant (Note: The Staff (Mr. Hayward & Sir Ryan Matthews) defeated Brad Slayer & RKJ for the vacant titles.)	17 August 2024	596+	
WAW World Light Heavyweight Championship	Sir Ryan Matthews	Mitchell Starr	28 February 2025	401+	
WAW European Heavyweight Championship	Swede	Mitchell Starr	26 August 2024	587+	
WAW British Heavyweight Championship	Nathan Black	RKJ	18 October 2024	534+	
WAW People's Championship	Kobe Nitro	PJ Knight	12 April 2025	358+	
WAW Under-23 Championship	Jaiden Docwra	Dillon Slade	19 February 2022	1,506+	
WAW Academy Championship	Rocket Raistlin	Patrick Patterson	1 February 2025	428+	
WAW Academy Tag Team Championship	The Ringmasters (Steven Willett & Oliver Campbell)	The YPC (CT & Carlton)	12 April 2025	358+	

=== Retired ===
Championship	Last champion(s)	Date won	Date retired	Previous champion(s)	First champion(s)	Reference
WAW International Championship	Brody Steele	22 September 2018	2019	Aaron O'Malley	Aaron O'Malley	
WAW Television Championship	RKJ	5 May 2018	2019	Alexander Young	RKJ	
RQW World Heavyweight Championship	Luke Hawx	19 March 2016	14 May 2016	Roy Knight	Robbie Brookside	
RQW European Tag Team Championship	The UK Hooligans (Zak Knight and Roy Knight)	1 May 2015	14 May 2016	K4 (King Kendo and Karl Kramer)	Team Charming (Jack Storm and Dave Moralez)	
RQW European Cruiserweight Championship	Mitchell Starr	22 May 2016	5 June 2016	Peter Nixon	Bubblegum	

== See also ==
- Professional wrestling in the United Kingdom
- List of professional wrestling promotions in the United Kingdom
