= UK Pitbulls =

Professional wrestling tag team

Tag team
- Members: Big Dave; Bulk
- Billed heights: 6 ft 2 in (1.88 m) - Big Dave; 6 ft 0 in (1.83 m) - Bulk
- Combined billed weight: 884 lb (401 kg)
- Billed from: Norwich, England, United Kingdom
- Debut: 1998

The UK Pitbulls are a professional wrestling tag team that consists of brothers Bulk (Mike Waters, born 1978) and Big Dave (Dave Waters, born 1971). They previously held a number of titles in the United Kingdom, United States, as well as 11 countries worldwide. Their career as a tag team ended for some years when Dave sustained an injury in a strongman contest. They held 20 tag team championships. They were named "England's Most Dominant Tag Team" by Total Wrestling Magazine. After Big Dave's injury and a sustained period of rehab over many years the pair are wrestling again as the UK Pitbulls and have featured in Fightmare Norwich 2019.

== Professional wrestling career ==
Dave was originally trained by Andre Baker at NWA UK Hammerlock. Dave and Mike completed their training in late 1997 at World Association of Wrestling (WAW) of Norwich under Sweet Saraya.

The UK Pitbulls name is actually a play on the World Wrestling Federation's British Bulldogs tag team name; Bulk and Big Dave were asked to wrestle as the British Bulldogs on a holiday camp but declined and suggested the name UK Pitbulls instead.

The UK Pitbulls opened a professional wrestling and powerlifting gym "Pitbull Powerhouse" in Cromer, Norfolk. Here they ran a wrestling training school and also concentrated on weightlifting, strongman training, fitness weight loss, and any routine to personal requirements. Dave and Mike were directly involved in the wrestling training as well as having regular guest trainers. They also ran their own promotion, DAM Promotions (Dave and Mike Promotions), holding several shows in Holt, Norfolk.

In 2008, Dave's knee collapsed during a strongman competition, and he was forced to retire. At the time of Dave's injury, The UK Pitbulls were Premier Wrestling Federation's Tag Team Champions. Subsequently, Mike wrestled in singles matches for three years. In 2011, he won Falling Starr Wrestling's Championship from Jimmy Starr. Mike considered retiring, but instead formed a tag team a second incarnation of the team with Big Joe. In late 2016, they teamed up with Hornswoggle to take on Sid Scala, Adam Maxted, and Lord Gideon Grey for XWA's Winter Supershow.

Mike also wrestles in a team called The Unnatural Disasters with Karn. They appeared on Total Nonstop Action Wrestling's British Boot Camp 2. In August 2018, The UK Pitbulls returned after Big Dave came out of retirement, and remain active as a tag team, as of February 2025.

== Other media ==
The Waters Brothers have appeared in the television series Trisha, as well as documentaries on Five and ITV2, and in an independent film called Slumber Party. They also appeared on Channel 4's The Big Breakfast, and in 2003 they filmed several segments for MTV's Dirty Sanchez and ITV's Celebrity Wrestling.

Dave is a former pro strongman, holding multiple titles across the UK, and placing 2nd in the UK's strongest man 1995.

Mike has appeared in ITV comedy show DEEP HEAT.

Mike filmed a speaking part in Danny Dyer's film Malice in Wonderland.

Mike, portrays The Blob in the 2024 film Deadpool & Wolverine.

Mike is also a drummer and plays for 3 bands, Dynamite & Dinosaurs, Haunted men, and buffalo blonde and has previously played for Fat n furious, Spot, the pocket godzillas.

MIke has also recorded with former Wildhearts bass player Danny McCormack and plan to play live shows together

== Personal lives ==
=== Mike Waters ===
Mike Waters, also known as Bulk, began playing drums at age 13. He is part of the rock band Spot, which formed in 1996, with Chris (guitar), Ollie (bass), and Bub (guitar and vocals). Bulk left the band for a short time to feature in another band, Over-Bored. He also performed with the band The Pocket Godzillas. He is married to Sheena.

=== Dave Waters ===
Dave Waters, also known as Big Dave, competed heavily in strongman competitions for 10 years before becoming a professional wrestler. He competed from 1990 to 2000 and reached the UK finals three years running, gaining second place in 1995. In 1996, he was ranked #1 in the UK and Europe, he competed in the universally recognized competitions, such as the Britain's Strongest Man and UK's Strongest Man events. Dave occasionally returns to run strongman competitions and spent most of 2007 coaching Richard "Bomber" Hudson for the World's Strongest Man events. Dave spent nearly 2 years rehabilitation, early 2017 to late 2018 and lost 7 stones in weight to return to wrestling in August 2018.

== Championships and accomplishments ==
- Allied Independent Wrestling Federations

- AIWF-GB Tag Team Championship (1 time)
- AIWF World Hardcore Tag Team Championship (3 times)

- World of Sport

- WOS Tag Team Championship (1 time, current)

- DAM Promotions

- DAM Tag Team Championship (1 time)

- Frontier Wrestling Alliance

- FWA Tag Team Championship (1 time)

- International Catch Wrestling Association

- ICWA World Tag Team Championship (2 times)

- Ultimate Wrestling Alliance

- UWA Tag Team Championship (1 time)

- K-Star Wrestling

- K-Star Tag Team Championship (1 time)

- Premier Wrestling Federation

- PWF Tag Team Championship (1 time)

- Lion Wrestling Promotions

- Lion Wrestling Promotions World Heavyweight Championship (1 time) - Bulk

- Real Deal Wrestling

- RDW Tag Team Championship (1 time)

- World Association of Wrestling

- WAW British Heavyweight Championship (1 time) – Bulk
- WAW Open Championship (1 time) – Big Dave
- WAW Tag Team Championship (4 times)
- WAW Youth Championship (1 time) – Bulk
- King of the Ring (1998) – Bulk
- Wrestler of the Year (2001) – Big Dave

- British Real Attitude Wrestling League

- BRAWL Tag Team Championship (1 time)

- Other titles

- British Wrestling Website's British Tag Team of the Year (2004, 2005)
- EWC Tag Team Championship (1 time)
- SCW Commonwealth Championship (1 time) – Bulk
- UCW Tag Team Championship (1 time)
- UKWW's UK Tag Team of the Year (2005)
