= Ricky Knight =

British professional wrestler (born 1953)

Personal information
- Born: Patrick David Frary; 24 December 1953 (age 72)
- Spouse: Sweet Saraya (m. 1990)
- Children: Saraya Bevis; Roy Bevis; Zak Zodiac

Professional wrestling career
- Billed from: Norwich, England
- Trained by: Jimmy Ocean
- Debut: 1978
- Retired: 21 September 2024

Patrick David Frary (born 24 December 1953) is an English professional wrestling trainer, promoter, owner, and former professional wrestler, better known by his ring name "Rowdy" Ricky Knight. He is the owner of the World Association of Wrestling promotion in Norwich.

== Professional wrestling career ==
Knight was working as a bouncer when he first met professional wrestler Jimmy Ocean. Ocean trained Knight, and the duo formed a tag team. Throughout the 1990s, they teamed together as The Superflys on the British circuit. The team was managed by Knight's wife Sweet Saraya. The trio appeared on Reslo, Orig Williams' Welsh-language wrestling programme on S4C. The Superflys wrestled in All Star Wrestling, holding the British Open Tag Team Championship four times together. Their final title reign ended in 1998 when Knight and Ocean fell out (kayfabe) and Ocean beat Knight in a singles match for the title then chose the Canary Kid as his partner. Three years later in 2001, Knight won the TWA version of the title with son Roy as the New Superflies.

Knight, Sweet Saraya, and Jimmy Ocean formed the World Association of Wrestling in 1994 in Norwich. Ocean left the business one year later. The promotion also included a wrestling school, The WAW Academy, which trained Roy Knight and The UK Pitbulls. The WAW Academy is Europe's longest running wrestling school. As a member of the roster, Knight has held the WAW World Heavyweight Championship one time. He also held the WAW Tag Team Championship with Ocean.

== Personal life ==
Knight was in prison for eight years, mostly due to violent offences.

Knight is married to Julia Bevis, who wrestles under the name Sweet Saraya. They have two children, and he has two other from a previous marriage. His sons Roy Knight and Zak Zodiac wrestle on the British wrestling circuit as the UK Hooligans. Their daughter Paige wrestled for WWE, winning the NXT Women's Championship and the WWE Divas Championship twice before retiring due to a serious neck injury. The family was featured in The Wrestlers: Fighting with My Family, a 2012 documentary. The documentary was adapted into a feature film, Fighting with My Family, by Dwayne Johnson's production company Seven Bucks Productions. The film was directed by Stephen Merchant, with Nick Frost playing the role of Knight, and premiered at the Sundance Film Festival in 2019. At All In (2023) the Knight family accompanied Saraya Jade in her Women's World Championship entrance and exit.

== Championships and accomplishments ==
- All Star Wrestling
  - British Open Tag Team Championship (5 times) - 4 with Jimmy Ocean
- DAM Promotions
  - DAM Heavyweight Championship (1 time)
- Extreme World Wrestling
  - EWW St George's Championship (1 time)
- Herts and Essex Wrestling
  - HEW Heavyweight Championship (2 times)
  - HEW Tag Team Championship (3 times) - with Jimmy Ocean(1), Chuck Cyrus(1), and Karl Kramer(1)
- Independent Pro Wrestling Germany
  - IPW Senior Championship (1 time)
- Playhouse Wrestlefest
  - Wrestlefest Tag Team Championship (1 time) - with Zack Zodiac
- Premier Wrestling Federation
  - PWF Heavyweight Championship (1 time)
  - PWF Mid-Heavyweight Championship (1 time)
  - PWF Tag Team Championship (1 time) - with Roy Knight
- Pro Wrestling Illustrated
  - Ranked No. 457 of the top 500 singles wrestlers in the PWI 500 in 2019
- Real Deal Wrestling
  - RDW British Heavyweight Championship (1 time)
  - RDW Tag Team Championship (1 time) - with Zak Zodiac
- The Wrestling Alliance
  - British Heavyweight Championship (1 time)
  - British Open Tag Team Championship (1 time) - with Roy Knight
- World Association of Wrestling
  - WAW World Heavyweight Championship (1 time)
  - WAW Hardcore Championship (1 time)
  - WAW Pontins Open Championship (1 time)
  - WAW World Tag Team Championship (1 time) - with Jimmy Ocean
  - Eastern Area Championship (1 time)
- World Wide Wrestling League
  - W3L Heavyweight Championship (1 time)
- X Wrestling Alliance
  - British Inter-Federation Cup (2007) - with Jo FX, Kraft, and Zack Zodiac
