= The Wrestling =

1996 non-fiction book

- First edition (with image of Kendo Nagasaki)
- Author: Simon Garfield
- Subject: Professional Wrestling
- Publisher: Faber & Faber
- Publication date: 4 November 1996
- Media type: Print (Hardcover, paperback)
- Pages: 256
- ISBN: 978-0571236763
- Dewey Decimal: 796.8

The Wrestling is a non-fiction book by Simon Garfield, a British journalist and author. It charts the rise and fall in popularity of British professional wrestling over the course of the twentieth century.

== Overview ==
The book consists almost entirely of interviews with professional wrestlers or those who knew them, including Mick McManus, Big Daddy, Giant Haystacks, Kendo Nagasaki and the female wrestler Klondyke Kate, often giving the appearance of a conversation between the interviewees and the author.

Garfield also interviewed those involved in the promotion of professional wrestling, with a particular focus on the decision of LWT chief Greg Dyke to drop the sport from its schedules in 1988.

== Reception ==
The Independent described the book as "an affectionate account packed with drama, humour, tragedy and intrigue". The Guardian praised it as "Funny, tragic and full to the brim with outrageous arse-whupping, The Wrestling does its subject proud."

Interviewed in The Times, Richard Osman, asked for his favourite book, replied "Can I add a non-fiction book? Everyone to whom I’ve recommended Simon Garfield’s The Wrestling has loved it."
