= Roy Knight (wrestler) =

British professional wrestler

Roy Bevis
Personal information
- Born: 25 February 1981 (age 45) Norwich, Norfolk, England
- Children: 3, including Ricky Knight Jr.
- Family: Ricky Knight (father); Sweet Saraya (stepmother); Saraya Bevis (half-sister); Zak Zodiac (half-brother)

Professional wrestling career
- Ring name(s): Brian Knight; Hooligan Bud; Roy Knight; The Zebra Kid; Ricky Knight Jr.
- Billed height: 5 ft 11 in (1.80 m)
- Billed weight: 210 lb (95 kg)
- Trained by: Ricky Knight
- Debut: 1995

Roy Bevis (born 25 February 1981) is an English professional wrestler. He mainly competes under the ring name Roy Knight in World Association of Wrestling, which is owned and operated by his family. He has wrestled alongside his father Ricky Knight, his younger half-brother Zak Zodiac and his son Ricky Knight Jr.; with his son, he is a one-time British Tag Team Champion in Revolution Pro Wrestling (RPW).

== Professional wrestling career ==
At the age of 13, Bevis made his debut in Lingwood in Norfolk, as the Zebra Kid partnering with the Canary Kid in a tag-team match against Jamie Lee and the Brixton Brawler. Since then, he has been faced with many challengers, including the likes of Robbie Brookside, Doug Williams and his own father throughout many independent promotions in the United Kingdom. Bevis has not limited his career to the UK either, making appearances in the United States in 2002 for the now defunct Xtreme Pro Wrestling against Jonny Storm, Joey Matthews and Jerry Lynn.

Bevis' most high-profile work in the UK was for the W.A.W.; he made his Frontier Wrestling Alliance (FWA) debut in 2002 winning a four-way match against Paul Travell, Scotty Rock and Mark Sloan at FWA Carpe Diem for an FWA All-England title match a few weeks later, a title he won. Throughout 2002 and 2003, Bevis traded FWA's All-England title back and forth with many of FWA's stars, but when Bevis vacated the belt due to injury on 18 October 2003, Hade Vansen won a provisional championship match against Flash Barker. On 26 March 2004, Bevis made his return in a last effort to win back the title in an undisputed FWA All England Championship match, but Vansen walked out of this match still the champion.

At FWA Carpe Diem in June 2004, Doug Williams defeated Bevis when Ricky Knight turned on him. This led to a long-lasting feud between father and son, which involved many of the Bevis family members. All of this was fuelled by Bevis' decision to wrestle full-time for the FWA instead of his father's promotion, World Association of Wrestling (WAW). In September 2004, this storyline came to an abrupt end when Bevis was jailed for nine months for drink-driving and for dangerous driving. After this spell in prison, promoters the FWA released a statement welcoming him back, saying: "While the FWA does not condone Roy's actions, we recognize that he has now served his sentence." During Frontiers of Honor, a cross-promotional show between FWA and Ring of Honor in the United Kingdom, Samoa Joe, their ROH Champion, faced The Zebra Kid in a match that would make the belt a "World Title" as it was being defended outside the United States.

After this Bevis would once again wrestle more for independent promotions in the United Kingdom, including his father's WAW, under the names "Roy Knight" and "Brian Knight". On 4 February 2006 at Real Deal Wrestling's King Of The Castle event, Bevis would make it to the tournament final to defeat Ricky Knight and win RDW Heavyweight Championship. However, not long after this WAW announced on their forum that he would be taking a break from wrestling, to sort out some health and personal issues.

Bevis made a return to the ring in 2007. In 2008, he went on to defeat Erik Isaksen (at The Talk, Norwich) to win become the first British wrestler to hold the WAW World Heavyweight Championship. Bevis would go on to make many successful title defences against Christian Eckstein, Danny Collins, Martin Stone and Scott Fusion. In October 2010, Bevis lost the WAW World Heavyweight Championship to Scott Fusion at WAW's annual spectacular; October OutRage 12. Fusion is the second British wrestler to hold the title.

On 19 November 2010 at a WAW show in Norwich, Bevis regained the WAW World Heavyweight Championship in a match featuring Scott Fusion teaming with Karl Krammer against Bevis and his father, Ricky Knight. The rules stipulated that if either man pinned either Fusion or Krammer, then Bevis would regain the title. Knight pinned Krammer for the victory and Bevis regained the title. He lost the championship to Danny Boy Collins in March 2012 in a Hardcore Tag Team match when he again teamed with his father against Collins and former ECW Champion Steve Corino. Collins won the title when he choked Bevis out after a missed Zebra Crossing.

Bevis has since reverted to the Roy Knight ring name and formed a tag team with his brother Zak Knight to become the UK Hooligans. In 2011, the UK Hooligans won the HEW Tag Team Championship from The Devil's Playboys (Bret Meadows and Sam Knee), and in September 2012, they defeated Army of Two (Scott Fusion and Aaron Sharpe) to win the vacant RQW European Tag Team Championship.

== Personal life ==
Bevis is part of a professional wrestling family. His father and stepmother, known as Ricky Knight and Sweet Saraya respectively, are professional wrestlers, as are his half-siblings, Zak and Saraya Jade. Saraya Jade is signed to WWE under the ring name Paige. The family run the World Association of Wrestling (WAW) promotion. In July 2012, Channel 4 produced a documentary about the Knights entitled The Wrestlers: Fighting with My Family. Bevis has three children and one grandchild, and his eldest son, Ricky Knight Jr., is also a professional wrestler.

Bevis has multiple criminal convictions. In September 2004, he was jailed for nine months for drunk driving. In August 2005, he received a suspended prison sentence for brandishing a knife in a pub in Lowestoft, and punching a police officer. In September 2005, Bevis pleaded guilty to assault by beating after striking a referee during a non-league football match, having been sent off for violent conduct against another player while playing for Thetford Town against Stowmarket Town in the Eastern Counties Football League the previous month. Bevis was handed a 51-week suspended prison sentence, ordered to complete 180 hours community service, and fined £100 by a magistrate in addition to being ordered to pay a further £100 in compensation; he was also banned for 217 days and fined £125 by the Norfolk County Football Association, and told he would never play for Thetford Town again. In March 2010, Bevis received a suspended prison sentence and a community order after pleading guilty to affray and wounding for his involvement in a fight that wrecked a pub in May 2009, and attacking a drug dealer with a piece of tarmac during a deal in November of the same year. He had previously spent four months on remand for the offence. In July 2025, Bevis plead not guilty to a string of offences committed against a woman between March 2023 and April 2025; he was bailed and is due to stand trial in May 2027.

== Championships and accomplishments ==
- All Star Wrestling
  - British Tag Team Championship (1 time) – with Ricky Knight
  - Tag Team Tournament (2021) – with Roy Knight
- European Catch Tour Association
  - ECTA Tag Team Championship (1 time) – with Zak Knight
  - European Tag Team Grand Prix (2014) – with Zak Knight
- Frontier Wrestling Alliance
  - FWA All-England Championship (3 times)
- Herts and Essex Wrestling
  - HEW Tag Team Championship (2 times) – with Zak Knight/Bexx
- Power Of Wrestling
  - POW Tag Team Championship (1 time) – with Zak Knight
- Premier Wrestling Federation
  - PWF Light Heavyweight Championship (1 time)
  - PWF Tag Team Championship (1 time) – with Ricky Knight
- Preston City Wrestling
  - PCW Tag Team Championship (1 time) – with Zak Knight
- Pro Wrestling Elite
  - PWE Tag Team Championship (1 time) – with Zak Knight
- Pro Wrestling Illustrated
  - Ranked No. 385 of the top 500 singles wrestlers in the PWI 500 in 2018
- Real Deal Wrestling
  - RDW Heavyweight Championship (1 time)
  - RDW European Championship (2 times, inaugural, final)
  - RDW European Title Tournament (2009)
  - King Of The Castle (2006)
- Real Quality Wrestling
  - RQW World Heavyweight Championship (1 time)
  - RQW European Tag Team Championship (2 time, final) – with Zak Knight
- Revolution Pro Wrestling
  - Undisputed British Tag Team Championship (1 time) – with Ricky Knight Jr.
- Southside Wrestling Entertainment
  - SWE Tag Team Championship (1 time) – with Zak Knight
- Target Wrestling
  - Target Wrestling Tag Team Championship (1 time) – with Zak Knight
- World Association of Wrestling
  - WAW World Heavyweight Championship (6 times)
  - WAW British Heavyweight Championship (1 time)
  - WAW British Cruiserweight Championship (1 time)
  - WAW European Heavyweight Championship (1 time, inaugural)
  - WAW World Tag Team Championship (6 times) – with the Canary Kid (2), Hot Stuff (1), Ricky Knight Jr. (1), Zak Knight (3)
  - WAW King of The Ring (2009)
  - WAW European Heavyweight Title Tournament (2008)
