= Sweet Saraya =

English professional wrestler (born 1971)

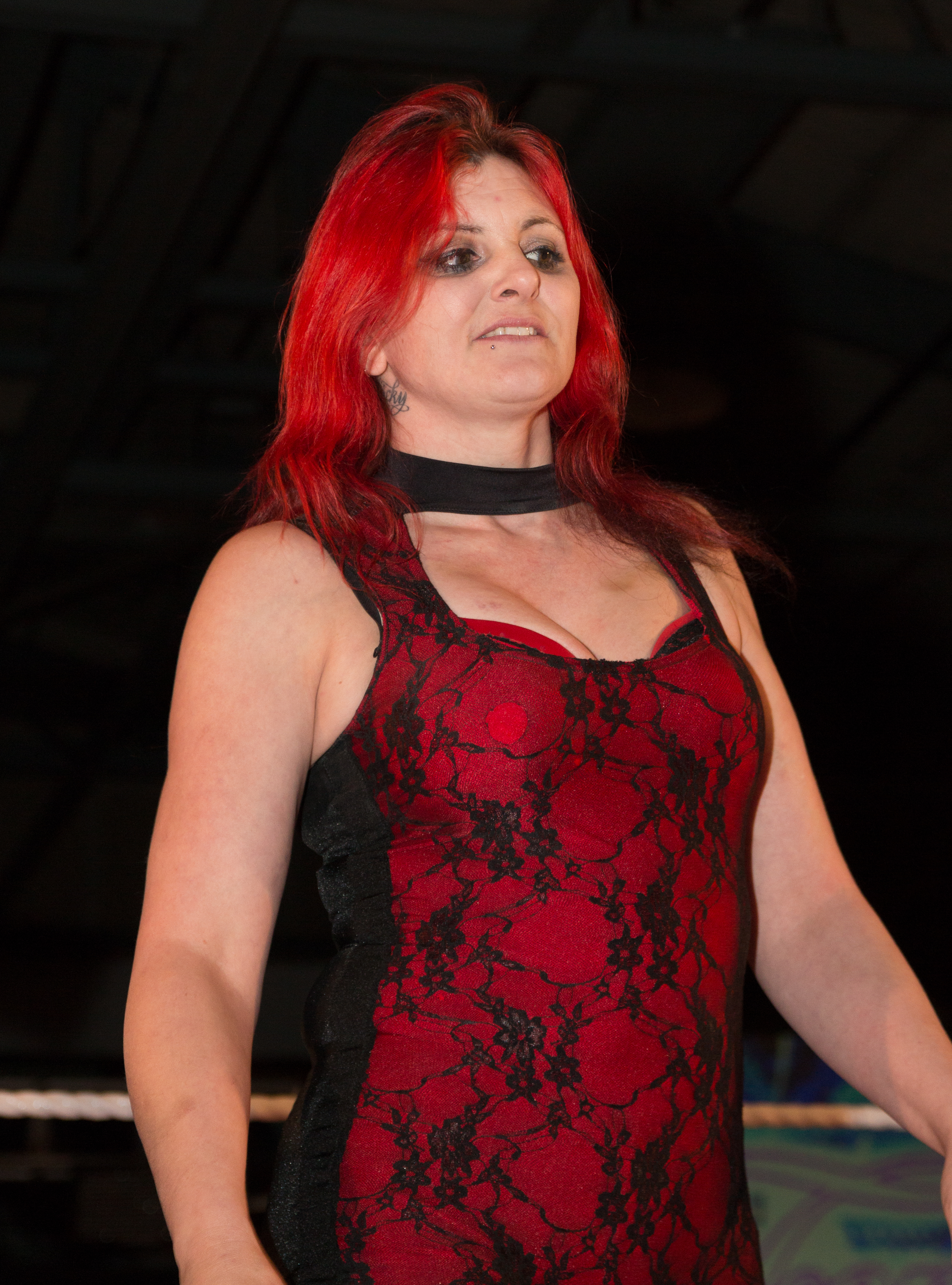
- Saraya at an NCW Femmes Fatales show in April 2014

Personal information
- Born: Julia Hamer-Bevis; 19 October 1971 (age 55) Penzance, Cornwall, England
- Spouse: Ricky Knight (m. 1990)
- Children: Saraya Bevis (daughter); Roy Bevis (stepson); Zak Zodiac (son)

Professional wrestling career
- Ring name(s): Saraya Knight; Sweet Saraya
- Billed height: 5 ft 8 in (1.73 m)
- Billed weight: 126 lb (57 kg; 9.0 st)
- Billed from: Norwich, Norfolk, England
- Trained by: Ricky Knight
- Debut: 1990

Julia Hamer-Bevis (née Hamer; born 19 October 1971), better known by her ring names Sweet Saraya and Saraya Knight, is an English professional wrestler, trainer and promoter. She is the mother of WWE's Paige, who was known as Saraya in AEW and on the independent circuit.

== Early life ==
Hamer was born in Penzance, Cornwall. As a child, she was abused by her stepfather, and ran away from home at the age of 15. She lived on the streets and used public swimming pools to bathe herself. She was also raped and became a drug addict. At the age of 18, she overdosed on pills and had her stomach pumped, which prompted her to get clean.

== Professional wrestling career ==
=== Early career ===
In 1990, Hamer landed a job as a chef at a Pontins holiday camp in Norfolk for the summer season, requesting that her employers wait for 12 hours as she had to hitchhike there. While working in the restaurant, she met professional wrestler Ricky Knight, part of the cabaret circuit. The two became inseparable, and Hamer soon left Pontins to travel with Knight full-time. She became involved in making wrestling costumes and putting the rings up and down. A few months later, Knight said he wanted her to be part of the show, as a manager in his corner. At a show in Camber Sands, Knight made her debut as Saraya. When the summer season finished, she joined the Sensational Superflys (Knight and Jimmy Ocean) as their manager. She appeared in their corner on Reslo, Orig Williams' Welsh-language wrestling programme on S4C. In 1993, Knight suggested that Saraya may want to wrestle. She agreed and was a quick learner, debuting later that year against Nikki Best. Saraya continued to wrestle and to manage Knight and Ocean for the rest of the 1990s for various UK promotions, including WAW and All Star Wrestling, winning the British Ladies Championship four times 1998–2002.

=== Shimmer Women Athletes and Shine Wrestling (2011–2020) ===
Saraya made her debut for the Berwyn, Illinois based all-female promotion Shimmer Women Athletes on 26 March 2011, at the tapings of Volume 37, alongside her daughter and tag team partner Britani Knight. Saraya and Britani were managed by the returning Rebecca Knox and made an open challenge, which was answered by Nikki Roxx and Ariel. The Knight Dynasty won the match via disqualification after Saraya tried to hit Ariel with brass knuckles and Ariel grabbed them and got caught hitting Saraya with them. Later that same day, at the tapings of Volume 38, the Knight Dynasty unsuccessfully challenged the Seven Star Sisters (Hiroyo Matsumoto and Misaki Ohata) for the Shimmer Tag Team Championship. During the 1 and 2 October 2011, tapings Britani entered a losing streak, which eventually caused Saraya to turn on her. Saraya and Britani faced each other in a no disqualification match on Volume 44, where Britani managed to pick up the win in her final Shimmer appearance, before heading to WWE. During the March 2012 tapings, Knight feuded with Cheerleader Melissa. The feud drew inspiration from a previous incident between the pair at a Real Quality Wrestling event in Colchester, England in 2007, where Knight suffered a career-threatening knee injury at the hands of Melissa. This culminated in a match on 18 March on Volume 48, where Knight defeated Melissa to win the Shimmer Championship.

Knight made her first defense of the title at the Shine Wrestling SHINE #4 iPPV in Ybor City, Florida on 19 October, defeating Jazz, and again at All American Wrestling (AAW) in Berwyn on 26 October, against MsChif. Knight successfully defended her Shimmer Championship during the October 2012 tapings, defeating Athena on Volume 49, Kellie Skater, MsChif and Hiroyo Matsumoto in a four-way elimination match on Volume 51, and in a rematch with Cheerleader Melissa on Volume 52. On 6 April 2013, at Volume 53, Knight lost the Shimmer Championship back to Cheerleader Melissa in a steel cage match. At Volume 65, Knight teamed up with Rhia O'Reilly to unsuccessfully challenge Kellie Skater and Tomoka Nakagawa for the Shimmer Tag Team Championship. In October, Knight formed a tag team with Mayumi Ozaki, and the duo would defeat Kana and LuFisto at Volume 68, and would unsuccessfully challenge Kellie Skater and Tomoko Nakagawa for the Shimmer Tag Team Championship at Volume 69 in a no disqualification tag team match. Knight returned to Shine Wrestling on 3 April 2015 at SHINE #26, where she and Su Yung defeated Jessicka Havok and Leva Bates in a no disqualification tag team match. At SHINE #30 on 2 October, Knight lost to Allysin Kay in an Anything Goes match.

=== World Association of Women's Wrestling (2011–2020) ===
In November 2011, Knight revived her all-female promotion WAWW, the sister promotion to her husband's World Association of Wrestling. The first show was called "The Return" and featured Shimmer Women Athletes wrestler Allison Danger in the main event against Knight for the vacant World Championship, which Danger would win.

The company's second show "Bellatrix" was held in March and was main evented by Busty Keegan teaming with Destiny to face "The Twisted Sisters" of Sweet Saraya and EWW Women's Champions Skarlett in a 2 out of 3 falls tag team match, which The Twisted Sisters defeated Keegan and Destiny 2 falls to 1. At the company's third show in June, Saraya unsuccessfully challenged Liberty for the British Championship, a title Liberty won from Knight's daughter Britani Knight. In September 2012, WAWW held The Queen of the Ring Tournament featuring Knight, Skarlett, Destiny, Lady Lori, Violet O'Hara, Miss Mina, Chanel and Penelope. The finals saw Destiny face Knight with Destiny victorious after interference from Jetta, who then brawled with Knight, causing the WAW roster to separate them.

== Personal life ==
Hamer married professional wrestler Patrick Bevis, better known by his ring name Ricky Knight, Together they have two children, both of whom are professional wrestlers: Saraya Jade, who wrestles for WWE under the ring name Paige and previously for AEW under the ring name Saraya, and Zak, who performs as Zak Zodiac. She is also the stepmother of Roy Bevis, who performs as Zebra Kid and Roy Knight. Hamer once wrestled while she was unknowingly seven months pregnant with Saraya Jade. For a time, WWE Hall of Famer Jake "The Snake" Roberts lived with the family. The family runs the World Association of Wrestling (WAW) promotion in Norwich. She owns and operates Bellatrix Female Warriors, a women's wrestling promotion also based in Norwich.

In July 2012, Channel 4 produced a documentary about the Knights entitled The Wrestlers: Fighting with My Family. The documentary was turned into a 2019 feature film by Stephen Merchant with Dwayne Johnson producing, titled Fighting with My Family, where she was portrayed by Lena Headey.

In June 2020, she was accused by former trainees of verbal and physical abuse. After the allegation, she took a step back from social media, claiming she and the Knight family were preparing to take legal action against those who have made such allegations. She then returned to professional wrestling in December 2020, wrestling for WAW. At All In (2023) the Knight family accompanied Saraya Jade in her Women's World Championship entrance and exit.

== Championships and accomplishments ==
- All Star Wrestling
  - British Women's Championship (4 times)
- German Stampede Wrestling
  - GSW Women's Championship (1 time)
- Herts & Essex Wrestling
  - HEW Women's Championship (3 times)
- New Horizons Pro Wrestling
  - IndyGurlz Australia Championship (1 time)
- Premier Wrestling Federation
  - PWF Ladies Tag Team Championship (1 time) – with Britani Knight
- Pro Wrestling Illustrated
  - Ranked No. 3 of the top 50 female wrestlers in the PWI Female 50 in 2013
- Queens of Chaos
  - Queens of Chaos Championship (1 time)
- Real Quality Wrestling
  - RQW Women's Championship (1 time)
- Shimmer Women Athletes
  - Shimmer Championship (1 time)
- TNT Extreme Wrestling
  - TNT Women's Championship (1 time, inaugural)
- Bellatrix Female Warriors
  - Bellatrix World Championship (2 times)
  - Bellatrix European Championship (2 times, current)
  - Bellatrix British Championship (2 times)
- Women's Wrestling Hall of Fame
  - Class of 2025
- World Association of Wrestling
  - WAW Peoples Championship (1 time, current)
