= List of Latin phrases (F) =

This page is one of a series listing English translations of notable Latin phrases, such as veni, vidi, vici and et cetera. Some of the phrases are themselves translations of Greek phrases, as ancient Greek rhetoric and literature started centuries before the beginning of Latin literature in ancient Rome.

Latin	Translation	Notes
faber est suae quisque fortunae	every man is the artisan of his own fortune	Appius Claudius Caecus; motto of Fort Street High School in Petersham, Sydney, Australia
fac et spera	do and hope	motto of Clan Matheson
fac fortia et patere	do brave deeds and endure	motto of Prince Alfred College in Adelaide, Australia
fac simile	make a similar thing	origin of the word facsimile, and, through it, of fax
faciam eos in gentem unam	I will make them into one nation	appeared on British coinage following the Union of the Crowns
faciam quodlibet quod necesse est	I'll do whatever it takes	
faciam ut mei memineris	I'll make you remember me	from Plautus, Persa IV.3–24; used by Russian hooligans as tattoo inscription
facile princeps	easily the first	said of the acknowledged leader in some field, especially in the arts and humanities
facilius est multa facere quam diu	It is easier to do many things, than one thing consecutively	Quintilian, Institutio Oratoria 1/12:7
facio liberos ex liberis libris libraque	"I make free adults out of children by means of books and a balance."	motto of St. John's College in Annapolis, Maryland, and Santa Fe, New Mexico
facta, non verba	deeds, not words	Frequently used as motto
factum fieri infectum non potest	It is impossible for a deed to be undone	Terence, Phormio 5/8:45
falsus in uno, falsus in omnibus	false in one, false in all	A Roman legal principle indicating that a witness who willfully falsifies one matter is not credible on any matter. The underlying motive for attorneys to impeach opposing witnesses in court: the principle discredits the rest of their testimony if it is without corroboration.
familia supra omnia	family over everything	frequently used as a family motto
fas est et ab hoste doceri	It is lawful to be taught even by an enemy	Ovid, Metamorphoses 4:428
Fatetur facinus qui judicium fugit	He who flies from justice acknowledges himself a criminal.	Under such circumstances the presumption is one of guilt.
febris amatoria	fever of love	Hypochromic anemia or chlorosis, once described as the "fever of love", which was believed to stem from the yearning for passion in virgins. First written about in 1554 by the German physician Johannes Lange. Also known as "Disease of the Virgins".
feci quod potui, faciant meliora potentes	I have done what I could; let those who can do better.	Slight variant ("quod potui feci") found in James Boswell's An Account of Corsica, there described as "a simple beautiful inscription on the front of Palazzo Tolomei at Siena". Later, found in Henry Baerlein's introduction to his translation of The Diwan of Abul ʿAla by Abul ʿAla Al-Maʿarri (973–1057); also in Anton Chekhov's Three Sisters, act 1. Also in Alfonso Moreno Espinosa, Compendio de Historia Universal, 5. ed. (Cádiz 1888).
NN fecit	NN made (this)	a formula used traditionally in the author's signature by painters, sculptors, artisans, scribes etc.; compare pinxit
fecisti patriam diversis de gentibus unam	"From differing peoples you have made one native land"	Verse 63 from the poem De reditu suo by Rutilius Claudius Namatianus praising emperor Augustus.
felicior Augusto, melior Traiano	"be more fortunate than Augustus and better than Trajan"	ritual acclamation delivered to late Roman emperors
Felicitas, Integritas et Sapientia	Happiness, Integrity and Knowledge	The motto of Oakland Colegio Campestre school through which Colombia participates of NASA Educational Programs
felix culpa	fortunate fault	from the "Exsultet" of the Catholic liturgy for the Easter Vigil
felix qui potuit rerum cognoscere causas	happy is he who can ascertain the causes of things	Virgil. "Rerum cognoscere causas" is the motto of the London School of Economics, University of Sheffield, and University of Guelph.
felo de se	felon from himself	archaic legal term for one who commits suicide, referring to early English common law punishments, such as land seizure, inflicted on those who killed themselves
fere libenter homines id quod volunt credunt	men generally believe what they want to	People's beliefs are shaped largely by their desires. Julius Caesar, The Gallic War 3.18
festina lente	hurry slowly	An oxymoronic motto of Augustus. It encourages proceeding quickly, but calmly and cautiously. Equivalent to "more haste, less speed". Motto of the Madeira School, McLean, Virginia and Berkhamsted School, Berkhamsted, England, United Kingdom
festinare nocet, nocet et cunctatio saepe; tempore quaeque suo qui facit, ille sapit.	it is bad to hurry, and delay is often as bad; the wise person is the one who does everything in its proper time.	Ovid
fex urbis lex orbis	dregs [classical Latin faex] of the city, law of the world	attributed to Saint Jerome by Victor Hugo in Les Misérables
fiat	Arbitrary or authoritative command or order to do something; an effectual decree	3rd-person singular present passive subjunctive from Latin facio
fiat justitia	"Let justice be done"	warrant, petition; motto of several institutions
fiat iustitia, et pereat mundus	let justice be done, even if the world should perish	motto of Ferdinand I, Holy Roman Emperor
fiat justitia ruat caelum	let justice be done, even if the sky should fall	attributed to Lucius Calpurnius Piso Caesoninus
fiat lux	let there be light	from the Genesis, "dixitque Deus fiat lux et facta est lux" ("and God said: 'Let there be light', and there was light."); frequently used as the motto of schools.
fiat mihi secundum verbum tuum	be it done to me according to thy word	Virgin Mary's response to the Annunciation
fiat panis	let there be bread	Motto of the United Nations Food and Agriculture Organization (FAO)
fiat voluntas Dei	May God's will be done	motto of Robert May's School; see the next phrase below
fiat voluntas tua	Thy will be done	Quotation of the third petition of the Pater Noster (Our Father) prayer dictated by Jesus Christ and his response to the Father during the Agony in the Garden of Gethsemane; motto of Archbishop Richard Smith of the Roman Catholic Archdiocese of Edmonton.
ficta voluptatis causa sint proxima veris	fictions meant to please should approximate the truth	Horace, Ars Poetica (338)
Fidei Defensor (Fid Def) or (fd)	Defender of the Faith	A title given to King Henry VIII of England by Pope Leo X on 17 October 1521, before Henry broke from the Roman Church and founded the Church of England. British monarchs continue to use the title, which is still inscribed on all British coins, and usually abbreviated.
fide et virtute	by fidelity and valor	motto of Kingswood College, Kandy
fidem scit	he knows the faith	sometimes mistranslated to "keep the faith" when used in contemporary English writings of all kinds to convey a light-hearted wish for the reader's well-being
fides qua creditur	the faith by which it is believed	Roman Catholic theological term for the personal faith that apprehends what is believed, contrasted with fides quae creditur, which is what is believed; see next phrase below
fides quae creditur	the faith which is believed	Roman Catholic theological term for the content and truths of the Faith or "the deposit of the Faith", contrasted with fides qua creditur, which is the personal faith by which the Faith is believed; see previous phrase
fides quaerens intellectum	faith seeking understanding	motto of St. Anselm; Proslogion
fidus Achates	faithful Achates	refers to a faithful friend; from the name of Aeneas's faithful companion in Virgil's Aeneid
filiae nostrae sicut anguli incisi similitudine templi	may our daughters be as polished as the corners of the temple	motto of Francis Holland School
finis coronat opus	the end crowns the work	A major part of a work is properly finishing it. Motto of Poole Grammar School in Dorset, UK; St. Mary's Catholic High School in Dubai, United Arab Emirates; on the coat of arms of Seychelles; and of the Amin Investment Bank
finis origine pendet	the end depends upon the beginning	one of the mottos of Phillips Academy
finis vitae sed non amoris	the end of life, but not of love	unknown
flagellum dei	the scourge of God	title for Attila the Hun, the ruthless invader of the Western Roman Empire
flatus vocis	[a or the] breath of voice	a mere name, word, or sound without a corresponding objective reality; expression used by the nominalists of universals and traditionally attributed to the medieval philosopher Roscelin of Compiègne
flectere si nequeo superos, Acheronta movebo	if I can not reach Heaven I will raise Hell	Virgil, Aeneid, Book VII.312
floreat Etona	may Eton flourish	Motto of Eton College, England, United Kingdom
floreat nostra schola	may our school flourish	a common scholastic motto
floreat pica	may the Magpie flourish	Motto of Collingwood Football Club
floruit (fl.)	one flourished	indicates a date on which a person is known to have been alive, often the period when a historic person was most active or was accomplishing that for which he is famous; may be used as a substitute when the dates of his birth and/or death are unknown.
fluctuat nec mergitur	it is tossed by the waves but does not founder	Motto of the City of Paris, France
fons et origo	the spring and source	also: "the fountainhead and beginning"
fons sapientiae, verbum Dei	the fount of knowledge is the word of God	motto of Bishop Blanchet High School
fons vitae caritas	love is the fountain of life	motto of Chisipite Senior School and Chisipite Junior School
formosam resonare doces Amaryllida silvas	teach the woods to re-echo "fair Amaryllis"	Virgil, Eclogues, 1:5
formosum pastor Corydon ardebat Alexin	the shepherd Corydon burned with love for the handsome Alexis	Virgil, Eclogues, 2:1. Highlighted by various authors (Richard Barnfield, Lord Byron) as a reference to same-sex love. Also Alexim.
forsan et haec olim meminisse iuvabit	perhaps even these things will be good to remember one day	Virgil, Aeneid, Book 1, Line 203
fortes fortuna adiuvat	Fortune favors the bold or Fortune favors the brave	From Terence's comedy play Phormio, line 203. Also spelled as fortis fortuna adiuvat. The motto of HMS Brave and USS Florida.
fortes fortuna iuvat	Fortune favors the brave	From the letters of Pliny the Younger, Book 6, Letter 16. Often quoted as fortes fortuna juvat. The motto of the Jutland Dragoon Regiment of Denmark.
fortes in fide	strong in faith	a common motto
fortis cadere, cedere non potest	the brave may fall, but can not yield	motto on the coat of arms of the Fahnestock Family and of the Palmetto Guard of Charleston, South Carolina
fortis est veritas	truth is strong	motto on the coat of arms of Oxford, England, United Kingdom
fortis et liber	strong and free	motto of Alberta, Canada
fortis in arduis	strong in difficulties/adversary	motto of the Municipal Borough of Middleton, from the Earl of Middleton and of Syed Ahmad Shaheed House of Army Burn Hall College in Abbottabad, Pakistan
fortiter et fideliter	bravely and faithfully	a common motto
fortiter in re, suaviter in modo	resolute in execution, gentle in manner	a common motto
fortius quo fidelius	strength through loyalty	Motto of St Kilda Football Club
fortunae meae, multorum faber	artisan of my fate and that of several others	motto of Gatineau
fraus omnia vitiat	fraud vitiates everything	a legal principle: the occurrence or taint of fraud in a (legal) transaction entirely invalidates it
Frustra legis auxilium quaerit qui in legem committit	in vain does he who offends the law seek the law's aid	a legal principle: one cannot invoke the law to assist in an illegal purpose. Inscribed on the facade of the Quebec Court of Appeal in Montreal.
fui quod es, eris quod sum	I once was what you are, you will be what I am	An epitaph that reminds the reader of the inevitability of death, as if to state: "Once I was alive like you are, and you will be dead as I am now." It was carved on the gravestones of some Roman military officers.
fumus boni iuris	presumption of sufficient legal basis	a legal principle
fundamenta inconcussa	unshakable foundation	
