= Chief Little Wolf =

American professional wrestler (1911–1984)

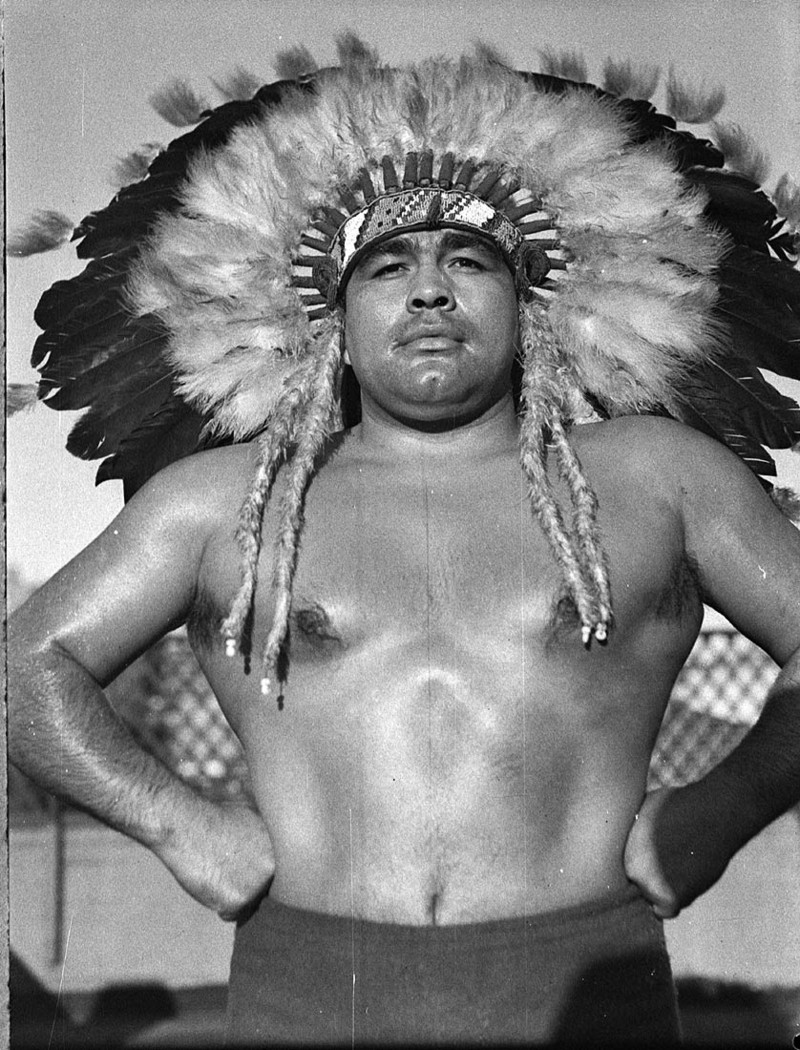
- Chief Little Wolf, Sydney, 1937.

Personal information
- Born: Ventura Tenario; November 25, 1911 Hoehne, Colorado, United States
- Died: November 13, 1984 (aged 72) Seattle, Washington, United States

Professional wrestling career
- Ring name(s): Benny Tenario; Ben Tenario; Big Chief Little Wolf; Chief Little Wolf
- Billed height: 5 ft 9 in (175 cm)
- Billed weight: 244 lb (111 kg)
- Trained by: Count Zaremba
- Debut: 1928
- Retired: 1958

Ventura Tenario (November 25, 1911 – November 13, 1984), better known by his ring name Chief Little Wolf (sometimes, Big Chief Little Wolf), was an American professional wrestler, who spent much of his professional career wrestling in Australia and New Zealand.

== Family ==
The second of four children of Jose Porfiria "Joe" Tenario (1884-1956), and Maria Soleila "Mary" Tenario (1890-1928), née Senas, Ventura Tenario was born at Hoehne, Colorado on 25 November 1911.

He married three times. His first wife was Irene Olive (1909-1998); his second wife was Dorothy Helen Pratt (1918-1972), whom he married in 1946; and his third wife was Australian-born Audrey Lillis "Dona" Corner (1923-2013) — with whom he had a daughter, Markeeta.

=== Markeeta Little Wolf ===
Markeeta, born in Christchurch, New Zealand, on January 25, 1958, was a pop-star in Australia by the time that she was 16. She later moved to the USA; and, having unsuccessfully tried to break into the American music industry and the Hollywood movie scene, she turned to real-estate, eventually moving to Waitsburg, Washington, where she married lawyer Michael Hubbard, became involved in local politics, joined the City Council, and served three terms as the city's Mayor.

=== Ernesto Tenario ===
According to the Online World of Wrestling, Ventura's brother, Ernesto Tenario (1915-1998), wrestled under the name of "Chief Lone Wolf".

== Military service ==
He enlisted in the United States Army in May 1943 and served until January 1945. He served in the European Theater of Operations in World War II.

External media

Images
- Royal Melbourne Show billboard sign advertising "The Big Chief Little Wolf show" (c.1955), collection of the National Library of Australia.
- Chief Little Wolf, Sydney, Australia (June 1957), collection of the State Library of New South Wales.

Audio
- "I am a Sunbird" (1975): Markeeta Little Wolf.

Video
- Chief Little Wolf vs. Danno O'Mahoney, New York State Athletic Commission World Heavyweight Championship Title Match, Yankee Stadium, New York, 8 July 1935.
- Chief Little Wolf vs. Andy Moen, Sydney Stadium, 15 May 1939.
- Chief Little Wolf vs. Nick Lutze, USA, 1940s, collection of Huntley Film Archives.
- Chief Little Wolf vs. Fred Atkins, Sydney Stadium, 14 August 1947.
- "Indian Chiefs Wrestling": Chief Little Wolf vs. Chief Suni War Cloud (Joseph Vance Chorre, jnr. (1914-1987), Sydney Stadium, 8 July August 1954.
- Bert Newton's Good Morning Australia interview with Barry York (c1994) about Chief Little Wolf.
- "Never Been A Horse Who Couldn't Be Rode" (1975): Markeeta Little Wolf.
- "Wild Night" (1975): Markeeta Little Wolf.

== Wrestling ==
In his professional career, which lasted from 1932 to 1958, he fought in 1,141 matches for 501 wins, 178 draws, and 357 defeats; his opponents included: Lord James Blears, Warren Bockwinkel, Paul Boesch, Orville Brown, Jack Claybourne, Man Mountain Dean, Dean Detton, Yukon Eric, Ken Fenelon, Gorgeous George, Otto Kuss, Dave Levin, Ed Lewis, Jim Londos, Wild Bill Longson, Bobby Managoff, Mike Mazurki, Bronko Nagurski, Danno O'Mahoney, Harold Sakata, "Jumping Joe" Savoldi, Frank Sexton, Kinji Shibuya, Gus Sonnenberg, Sándor Szabó, Lou Thesz, and George Zaharias.

In 1946, having resumed his wrestling career post-war, and before returning to Australia, he sustained a double fracture of a leg in a match in Chicago; and, for a time, it was thought that he would not wrestle again.

=== United States ===
In February 1935, the (then) reigning heavyweight champion, Jim Londos was suspended in California, Illinois, and New York for failing to appear for his scheduled World Heavyweight Championship (Pacific Northwest) title defense against Tenario on 27 February 1935.

On July 8, 1935, Chief Little Wolf wrestled against Daniel "Danno" O'Mahoney, at Yankee Stadium, New York, in a heavyweight title match. This was the first title defence for O'Mahoney, who had won the New York State Athletic Commission World Heavyweight Championship from Jim Londos twelve days earlier, on June 27, 1935. O'Mahoney eventually won the match, by a pinfall, after 28 minutes and 23 seconds.

=== Australia and New Zealand ===
Tenario arrived in Auckland, New Zealand, from Vancouver, Canada, on 28 June 1937. In his first match in New Zealand, he was defeated (on points) by Sammy Stein; and, in his last match on his first visit to New Zealand, against Earl McCready on August 9, 1937, he was disqualified in the seventh round.

At the time of his first Australian appearance, on August 28, 1937 in a match against Hal Rumberg, at West Melbourne, the press noted that "Chief Little Wolf is at present ranked third on the list of world heavy weights".

In 1947, the wrestling journalist, "Ringmaster", noted that "his capacity for absorbing punishment seems to be unlimited, and he has the power and stamina to keep handing it out indefinitely". In Australia, from 1937 to 1958, "he fought more than a hundred individual wrestlers in more than a thousand contests"; and, in addition to his stadium wrestling he had a travelling tent-show, in which he demonstrated professional wrestling holds, told Navajo stories, and performed horse-riding tricks, with which he toured most of Australia — claiming, in 1953, that seventy-five percent of the Australian people had physically seen him either as a wrestler or as a tent-show performer.

In his last match in Australia, he teamed with "Great Zorro" in a tag-team match, at West Melbourne Stadium on November 10, 1956. They defeated the team of "Lucky" Simunovich and Dr. Jerry Graham, two falls to one.

=== Retirement ===
He wrestled twice more in the USA:

- February 26, 1957 (Syracuse, New York): teamed with Bob Leipler (a.k.a. "Duke Hoffmann"), he lost a tag-team match against "Mr. Hito" and "Mr. Moto" in 24 minutes 17 seconds.
- March 5, 1957 (Syracuse, New York): he was defeated by Dick Beyer in 15 mins 7 seconds.

Tenario suffered a debilitating stroke "that badly affected one side of his body and face" in 1958. He retired from wrestling, and never worked again. He lived at Mount Royal Special Hospital for the Aged, in Parkville, Victoria, from 1961 to 1980, when he returned to the United States.

=== Australian Folk-Hero ===
In his 1998 article, "Big Chief Little Wolf: Wrestling, Radio and Folklore in Australia", Barry York — at the time a Research Fellow at the Australian National University — describes how, in the months following his (1994) appeal for information from the public on Bert Newton's Good Morning Australia, he received more than 700 letters from "former wrestlers who had wrestled him, … nurses who had nursed him … and hundreds of people who had seen him wrestle or caught his side-show, or who had just met him by chance in the street or in a restaurant, pub, shop or cinema".

Their letters represent a folkloric understanding of the Chief. They indicate the qualities that individual writers wanted to believe were his qualities. Even the most exaggerated letter is a valuable source in identifying why so many people cherish him without even necessarily really knowing him personally.
If I were to sum up from the entire collection of 700 letters, I would say that Chief Little Wolf is a folk-hero because of the following perceived qualities …: he came from underprivileged origins and, despite success and celebrity status, identified with the common folk; he was an exceptionally kind-hearted human being: active and generous in helping others less fortunate than himself; he was excellent at what he did; he was regarded as possessing super-human qualities; he suffered a quick and tragic decline; and he was exotic — an acceptable outsider, a foreigner of the non-threatening kind.

=== Captain Tom Bairnsfather ===
During the sixth round of a fierce best-of-three-falls match against Terry McGinnis, at Leichhardt Stadium, on Saturday, September 7, 1940 with each wrestler having scored a fall, Tenario was thrown from the ring by McGinnis. McGinnis, who had lost his temper, refused to allow Tenario to re-enter the ring, and went on to attack the referee; and, for this, he was disqualified.

On October 24, 1940, Thomas Duncan Bairnsfather MC (1897-1949) — brother of Bruce Bairnsfather, Leichhardt Stadium's ring announcer, and, as "Captain Tom Bairnsfather", the ring-side wrestling commentator for the Sydney radio station 2KY (2KY listeners were assisted by the I.A.W. chart) — lodged a Supreme Court writ for £2,000 against Tenario, McGinnis, and New Leichhardt Stadium, Ltd., alleging that, "on September 9 last, when Chief Little Wolf and McGinnis were wrestling at Leichhardt Stadium, McGinnis threw Little Wolf out of the ring on top of Bairnsfather, causing him considerable Injury".

Responding to a ca re, Tenario's own position was that "I am under contract and I am fully protected against any accident that might occur". Tenario was released on a £350 bond. Tenario was released from bail on November 21, 1940 and was eventually allowed to leave Australia. Although Tenario returned to Australia, as promised, in July 1941, nothing more was heard of Bairnsfather's legal actions — although, of course, Bairnsfather was no stranger to being a defendant at court.

== Championships and accomplishments ==
- National Wrestling Alliance
  - NWA Rocky Mountain Heavyweight Championship (1 time: March 10, 1948).
- New York's Wrestling Hall of Fame
  - Class of 1974.

== Movies ==
There are a number of mistaken claims that Tenario appeared in two movies, as himself in the documentary Bone Crushers (1933), and as "Chief Pontiac" in the feature film We're in the Money (1935). In both cases, the man in the movies was the marathon swimmer, lifeguard, and professional wrestler Myron Cox (1901-1975).

== Death ==
He died at Seattle, Washington on November 13, 1984, and his remains were cremated.

== Gallery ==
Photos
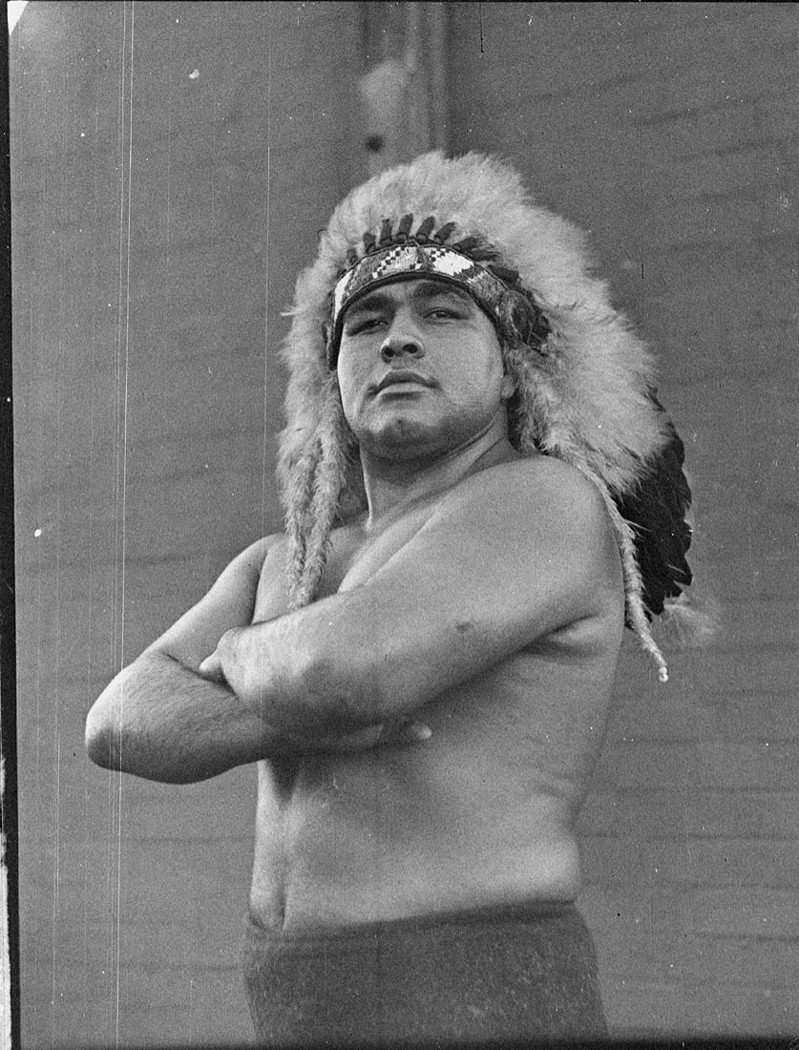
Chief Little Wolf, Sydney, 1937.

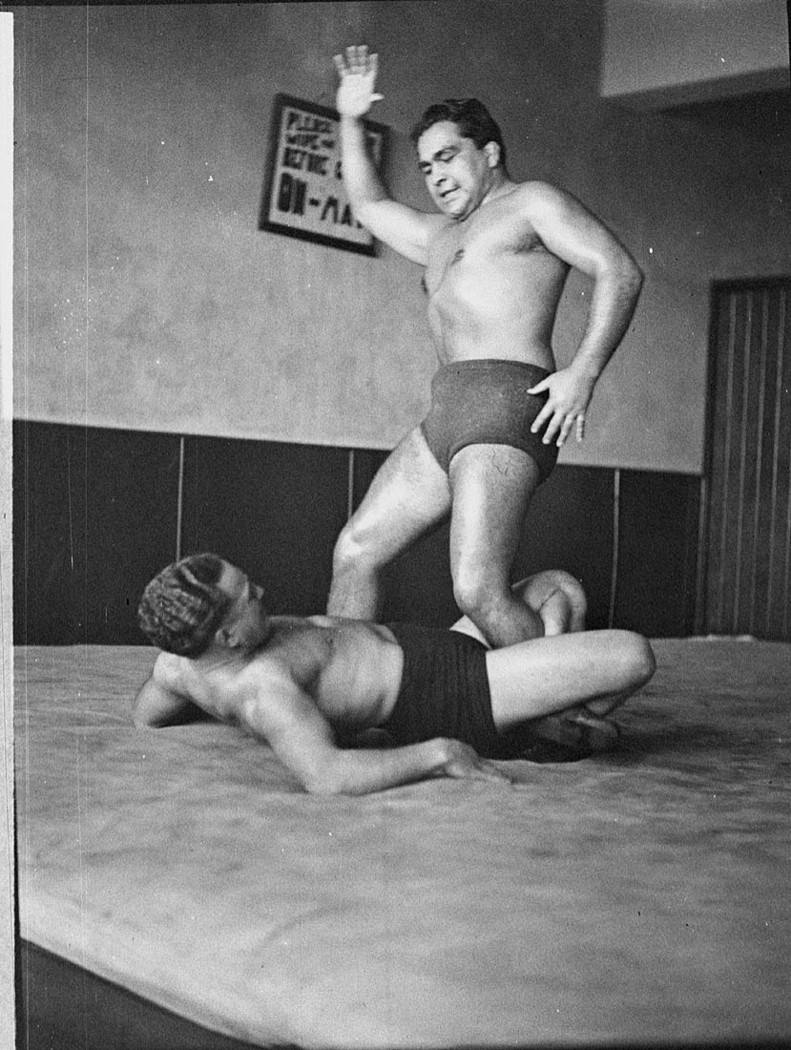
Chief Little Wolf demonstrating his "Indian deathlock"—(1),
Sydney, 1937.

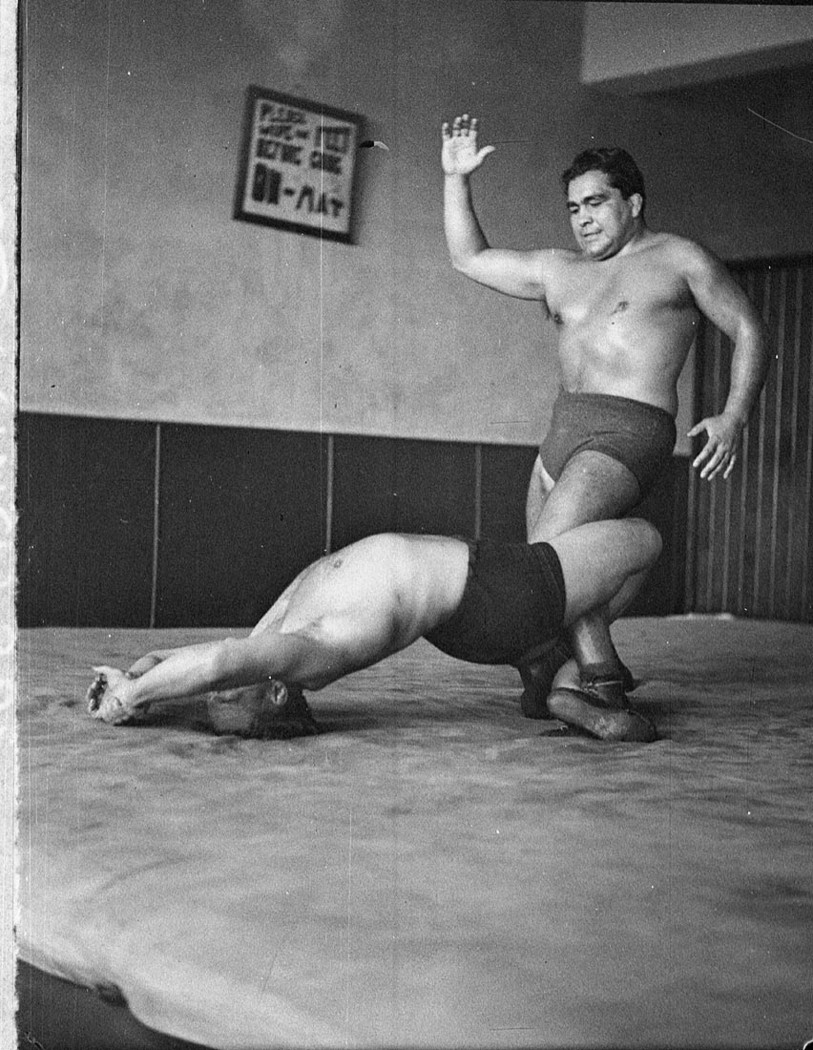
Chief Little Wolf demonstrating his "Indian deathlock"—(2),
Sydney, 1937.

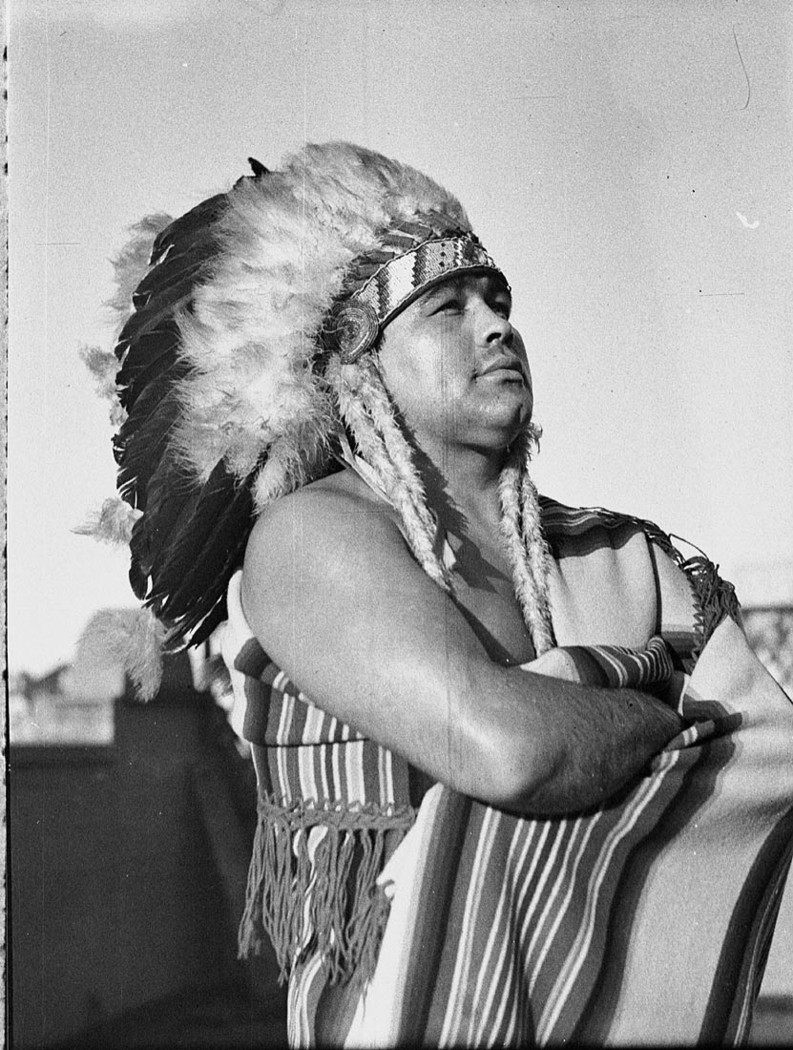
Chief Little Wolf, Sydney, 1937.

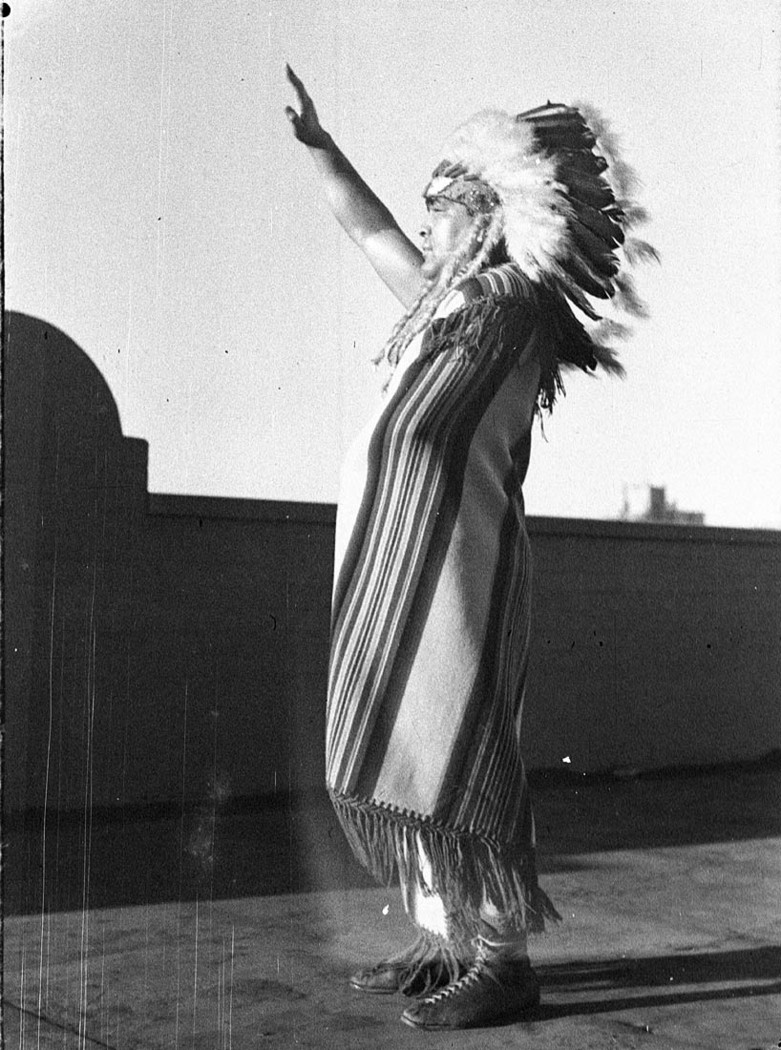
Chief Little Wolf, Sydney, 1937.

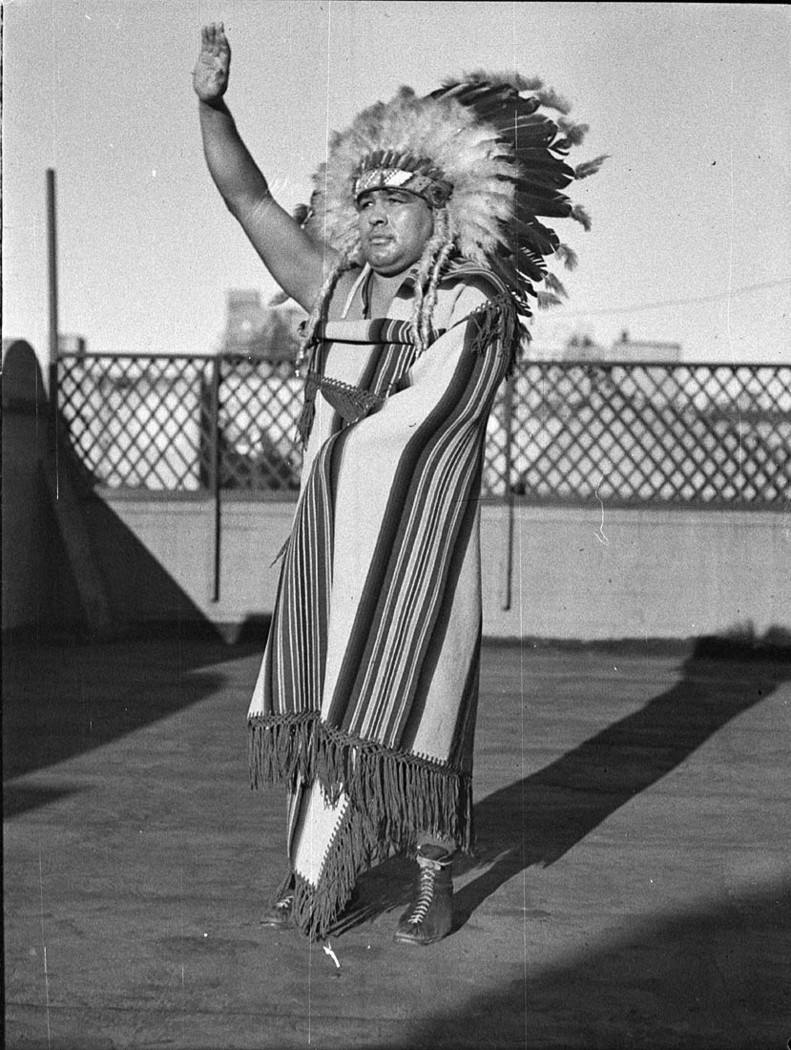
Chief Little Wolf, Sydney, 1937.

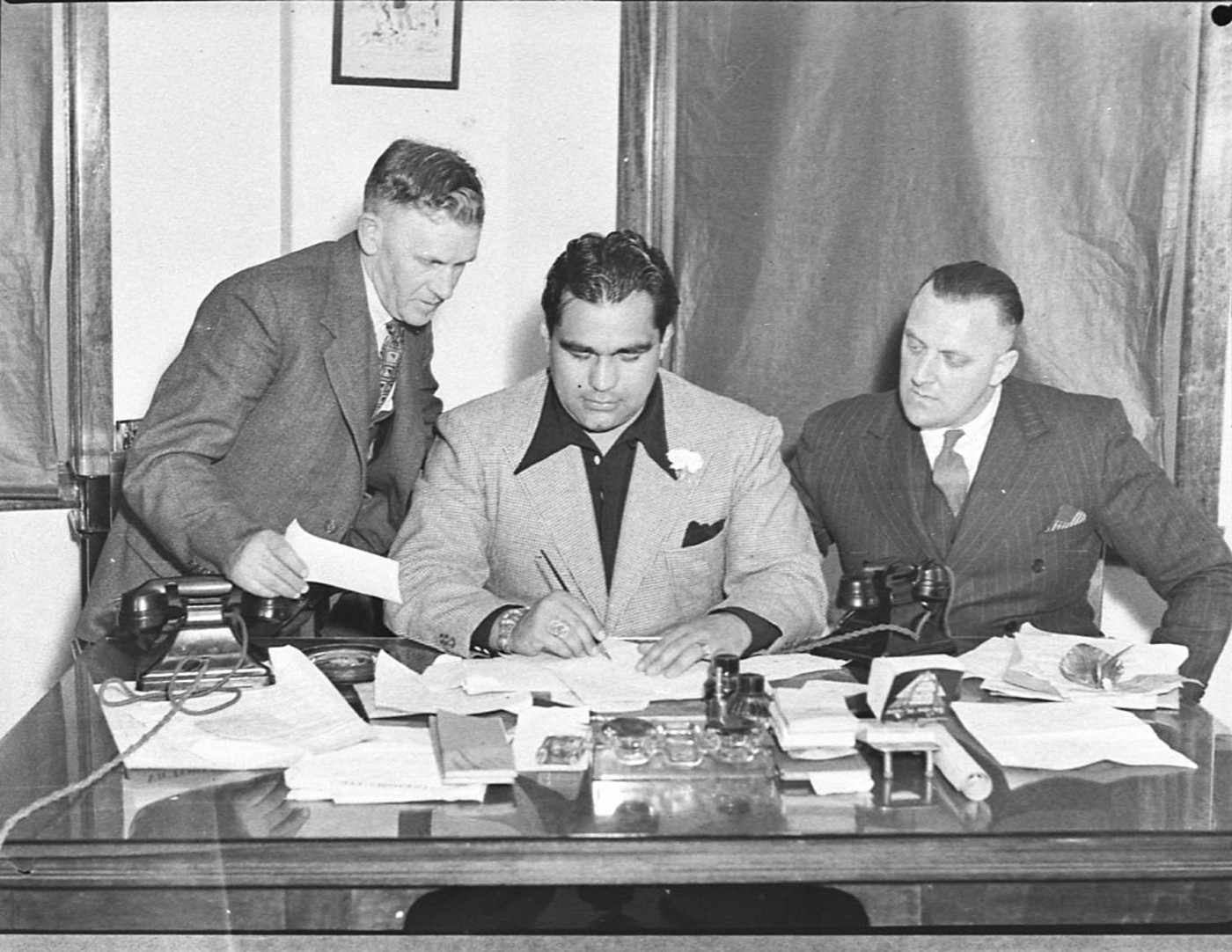
Ventura Tenario signing contract, Sydney, 1937.

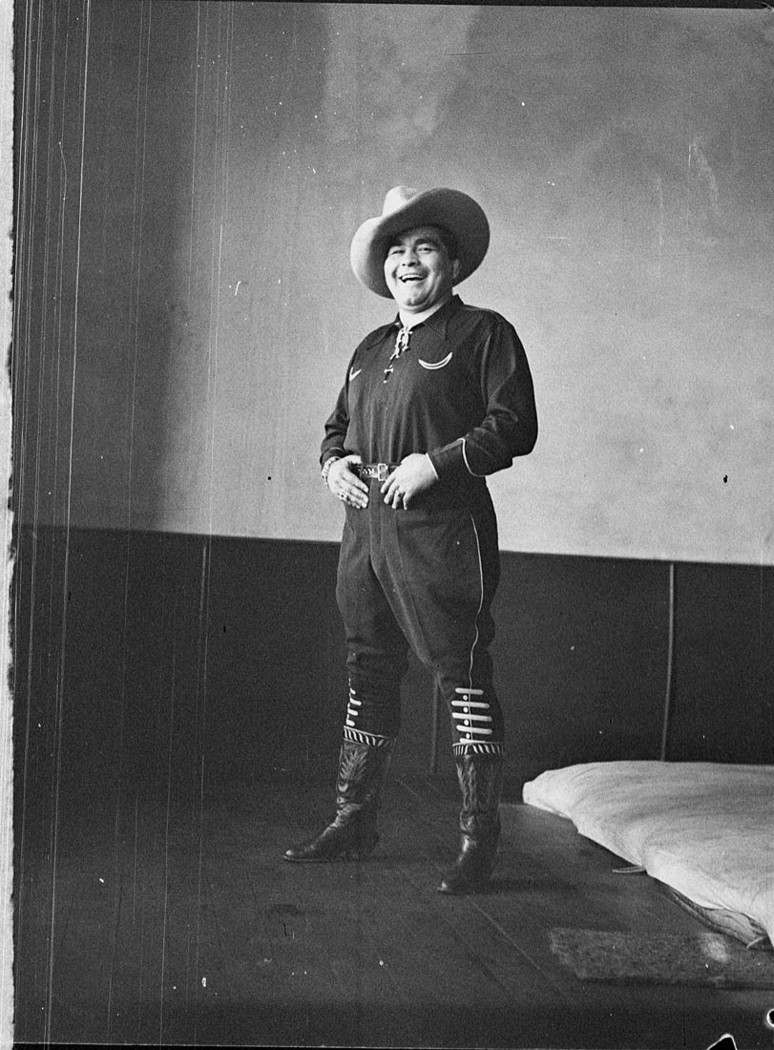
Ventura Tenario in his rodeo costume, Sydney, 1937.
