= Petition of right =

In English law, a petition of right was a remedy available to subjects to recover property from the Crown.

Before the Crown Proceedings Act 1947, the British Crown could not be sued in contract. However, as it was seen to be desirable that Crown contractors could obtain redress, lest they be inhibited from taking on such work, the petition of right came to be used in such situations, especially after the Petitions of Right Act 1860 simplified the process. Before the petition could be heard by the courts, it had to be endorsed with the words fiat justitia on the advice of the Home Secretary and Attorney-General. This Latin phrase was normally translated as "Let right be done".

One of the most famous causes célèbres in English law, the Archer-Shee case, arose out of proceedings on a petition of right.

Section 1 of the Crown Proceedings Act 1947 allows claims for which a petition would previously have been demanded to be brought in the courts directly as against any other defendant. However, a petition and fiat still appear to be necessary for personal claims against the monarch.

== Claims allowed ==
A petition of right was available:

- To obtain restitution of real or personal property of the subject which has found its way into the hands of the Crown, or compensation if restitution could not be made; or
- To recover damages for breach of a contract made on behalf of the Crown, whether the breach was due to the acts or the omissions of servants of the Crown.

Where the Crown was in possession of the property of the applicant, and the title of the Crown appeared by record, as by inquest of office, the remedy was somewhat different and was called monstrans de droit. Petition of right was not available in respect of engagements in the naval, military or civil service, which were not generally considered as contracts of employment but as appointments enjoyed during the pleasure of the Crown. This relationship based on the royal prerogative only ended in 1996. Nor was the action available for breach of public duty, e.g. a failure to perform treaty obligations, nor for trespass or negligence or other torts by Crown servants. Where such acts were wrongful the remedy was still by action against the official as an individual and not in his official capacity.

== Procedure ==
=== Common law ===
At common law the petition went through its earliest stages in Chancery. The petition suggested a right disputing the title of the Crown, and the Crown endorsed the petition soit droit fait la partie. Then a commission was issued to inquire into the truth of the suggestion. After the return to the commission, the Attorney-General filed a response and the merits were determined as in any inter partes action. If the right was determined against the Crown, judgment of amoveas manus was given in favour of the applicant.

== Scotland and Ireland ==
The law as to petitions of right applied to Ireland but not to Scotland, and a right to present such a petition was also thought to exist in colonies whose law was based on the common law of England. Ultimately, in many colonies legislation was passed with respect to claims against the government which made it unnecessary to resort to a petition of right.

== Bibliography ==
- Bradley, A.W. & Ewing, K.D. (2003). Constitutional and Administrative Law (13th ed.). London: Longman. pp. 770–771. ISBN 0-582-43807-1.
