= Arrest warrant =

Warrant authorizing the arrest and detention of an individual

An arrest warrant is a warrant issued by a judge or magistrate on the authority of a court which authorizes the arrest and detention of an individual or the search and seizure of an individual's property.

== In international law ==
=== European Arrest Warrant ===
European Arrest Warrants may be issued by any member state of the European Union and are valid across the EU. Execution of EAWs issued by other member states is typically compulsory, however, executing states have limited grounds for refusing to execute an EAW and may require guarantees from the issuing state to uphold the suspect's procedural rights.

=== International Criminal Court ===
The Rome Statute of the International Criminal Court authorises the International Criminal Court to issue arrest warrants for defendants in cases before it. ICC arrest warrants are issued by the Pre-Trial Chamber, and the court relies on its state parties to execute the warrants it issues. The ICC has issued arrest warrants in the past against several high-profile world leaders. Notable examples include Russian president Vladimir Putin in 2023, Israeli prime minister Benjamin Netanyahu in 2024, and former Philippine President Rodrigo Duterte in 2025.

== By country ==
=== Canada ===
Arrest warrants are issued by a judge or justice of the peace under the Criminal Code.

Once the warrant has been issued, section 29 of the code requires that the arresting officer must give notice to the accused of the existence of the warrant, the reason for it, and produce it if requested, if it is feasible to do so.

=== Czech Republic ===
Czech courts may issue an arrest warrant when it is not possible to summon or bring in for questioning a charged person and at the same time there is a reason for detention (i.e. concern that the charged person would either flee, interfere with the proceedings or continue criminal activity, see Remand in the Czech Republic).

The arrest warrant includes:

- identification of the charged person
- brief description of the act for which the person is charged
- designation of the section of the criminal code under which the person is charged
- precise description of the reasons for the issuance of the warrant

The arrest is conducted by the police. Following the arrest, the police must within 24 hours either hand the arrested person over to the nearest court or release the person.

The court must immediately interview the arrested person, who has the right to have an attorney present, unless the attorney is not within reach. The court has 24 hours from the moment of receiving the person from the police to either order remand or to release him. Reaching the maximum time is always reason for immediate release.

=== Germany ===
Detaining a person is only allowed under certain conditions defined by the Basic Law for the Federal Republic of Germany (German: Grundgesetz für die Bundesrepublik Deutschland). In article 104 (Deprivation of liberty), the fundamental law determines that only a Haftrichter ("arrest judge") may order confinement that exceeds 48 hours. The former is called vorläufige Festnahme ("provisional confinement"), the latter is named Haftbefehl ("order of arrest"). Arrest warrants serve the enforcement of the proper expiry for instance in the Code of Criminal Procedure, but also in the civil procedure law and in the administrative law and the special administrative procedures after the Tax Code, the Finance Court order or the social court law.

Article 2 (Personal freedoms)

(1) Every person shall have the right to free development of his personality insofar as he does not violate the rights of others or offend against the constitutional order or the moral law.

(2) Every person shall have the right to life and physical integrity. Freedom of the person shall be inviolable. These rights may be interfered with only pursuant to a law.

— Federal Republic of Germany, Basic Law

=== India ===
Courts can issue arrest warrant against an individual under Section 72 of Bharatiya Nagarik Suraksha Sanhita, 2023. Under bailable arrest warrant a person could execute a bail bond with sufficient sureties for his attendance before the Court at a specified time and thereafter until otherwise directed by the Court, the officer to whom the warrant is directed shall take such security and shall release such person from custody. A non bailable arrest warrant is usually issued for serious offences and if there exist a suspicion that the accused will abscond. Section 74 and 75 of BNSS provide the power to the Chief Judicial Magistrate or a Magistrate of the first class may direct a warrant to any person within his local jurisdiction for the arrest of any escaped convict, proclaimed offender or of any person who is accused of a non-bailable offence and is evading arrest. Such person shall acknowledge in writing the receipt of the warrant and shall execute it if the person for whose arrest it was issued, is in, or enters on, any land or other property under his charge. Section 78 of BNSS protects the rights of the arrested by making it compulsory for the police to present the arrested person before a magistrate within 24 hours of the arrest of the person.

=== United Kingdom ===
The procedure for issuing arrest warrants differs in each of the three legal jurisdictions.

==== England and Wales ====
In England and Wales, arrest warrants can be issued for both suspects and witnesses.

Arrest warrants for suspects can be issued by a justice of the peace under section 1 of the Magistrates' Courts Act 1980 if information (in writing) is laid before them that a person has committed or is suspected of having committed an offence. Such arrest warrants can only be issued for someone over 18 if at least one of the following is true:

- The offence the warrant relates to is an indictable offence, or is punishable with imprisonment.
- The person's address is not sufficiently established to serve a summons there.

Arrest warrants for witnesses can be issued if:

- A justice of the peace is satisfied on oath that:
  - Any person in England or Wales is likely to be able to give material evidence, or produce any document or thing likely to be material evidence, at the summary trial of an information by a magistrates' court,
  - It is in the interests of justice to issue a summons under this subsection to secure the attendance of that person to give evidence or produce the document or thing, and
  - It is probable that a summons would not procure the attendance of the person in question.
- or if:
  - A person has failed to attend court in response to a summons,
  - The court is satisfied by evidence on oath that he is likely to be able to give material evidence or produce any document or thing likely to be material evidence in the proceedings,
  - It is proved on oath, or in such other manner as may be prescribed, that he has been duly served with the summons, and that a reasonable sum has been paid or tendered to him for costs and expenses, and
  - It appears to the court that there is no just excuse for the failure.

==== Scotland ====
In Scotland, a warrant to apprehend may be issued if a defendant fails to appear in court.

==== Northern Ireland ====
In Northern Ireland arrest warrants are usually issued by a magistrate.

=== United States ===
For the police to make a lawful arrest, the arresting officer(s) must have either probable cause to arrest, or a valid arrest warrant.

A valid arrest warrant must be issued by a neutral judge or magistrate, who has determined there is probable cause for an arrest, based upon sworn testimony or an affidavit in support of the petition for a warrant. The arrest warrant must specifically identify the person to be arrested. If a law enforcement affiant provides false information or shows reckless disregard for the truth when providing an affidavit or testimony in support of an arrest warrant, that may constitute grounds to invalidate the warrant.

These minimum requirements stem from the language contained in the Fourth Amendment. Federal statutes and most jurisdictions require the issuance of an arrest warrant for the arrest of individuals for most misdemeanors that were not committed within the view of a police officer. However, as long as police have the necessary probable cause, a warrant is usually not needed to arrest someone suspected of a felony in a public place; these laws vary from state to state. In a non-emergency situation, an arrest of an individual in their home requires a warrant.

==== Adequate showing of probable cause ====
Probable cause can be based on either direct observation by the police officer, or on hearsay information provided by others. Information the police bring to the neutral and detached magistrate must establish that—considering the police officer's experience and training—the officer knows facts, either through personal observation or through hearsay, that would suggest to a reasonable, prudent person that the individual named in the warrant committed or was committing a crime.

From 1964 to 1983, a constitutionally adequate affidavit comprised exclusively or primarily of hearsay information had to contain information suggesting to the examining magistrate that (1) the hearsay declarant supplying the information to the police was a credible person, and (2) that the hearsay declarant had a strong basis of knowledge for the alleged facts. Since 1983, a constitutionally sufficient affidavit must support a conclusion by a reviewing magistrate that the "totality of the circumstances" suggest that there is a fair probability that the facts the police relied on for probable cause to arrest are valid; the magistrate balances "the relative weights of all the various indicia of reliability (and unreliability) attending an informant's tip."

==== Neutral and detached magistrate ====
The individual issuing the arrest warrant need not be a judge or an attorney, but must be both capable of determining whether probable cause exists as well as be a neutral and detached official. While arrest warrants are typically issued by courts, they may also be issued by one of the chambers of the United States Congress or other legislatures.

==== No known or reckless falsehoods ====
A warrant is invalid if the defendant challenging the arrest warrant can show, by a preponderance of the evidence, that:

- Specific parts of the affidavit the police submitted are false.
- The police either knowingly falsified them or made them with reckless disregard as to their truth or falsity.
- Excluding the false statements, the remainder of the affidavit would not have established probable cause to arrest.

==== Description of arrestee ====
The arrest warrant must, to comply with the Fourth Amendment, "particularly describe" the person to be seized. If the arrest warrant does not contain such a description, it is invalid—even if the affidavit submitted by the police or the warrant application contained this information.

==== Mittimus ====
A mittimus (Latin: mittimus, lit. 'we send') is a writ issued by a court or magistrate, directing the sheriff or other executive officer to convey the person named in the writ to a prison or jail, and directing the jailor to receive and imprison the person.

Police jargon sometimes refers to such a writs as a "writ of capias", defined as orders to "take" (or "capture") a person or assets. Capias writs are often issued when a suspect fails to appear for a scheduled adjudication, hearing, or similar proceeding.

==== Bench warrant ====
A bench warrant is a summons issued from "the bench" (a judge or court) directing the police to arrest someone who must be brought before a specific judge either for contempt of court or for failing to appear in court as required. Unlike a basic arrest warrant, a bench warrant is not issued to initiate a criminal action.

For example, if a defendant is released on bail or under recognizance and misses a scheduled court appearance, or if a witness whose testimony is required in court does not appear as required by a subpoena, a bench warrant may be issued for that person's arrest. In cases where a bench warrant is issued to arrest someone who posted bail and subsequently missed their court date, once they are rearrested and brought before the judge, the judge may raise the bail amount or revoke it completely.

If a law enforcement officer stops an individual with an outstanding bench warrant against him, the person may be detained on the warrant, and may be held in jail until bond is posted or a hearing is held on the warrant. The hearing may result in the court setting a new bail amount, new conditions, and a new court appearance date. If a criminal defendant is arrested on a bench warrant, the court may determine that the person is a flight risk (likely to flee the jurisdiction) and order that person held without bail.

==== Civil arrest warrant ====
A civil arrest warrant (capias mittimus)—in some applications known as a writ of bodily attachment—is an order issued by a court or, in some cases, a parliamentary body to compel the legally required attendance of a person at a judicial hearing or other proceeding.

Courts may issue civil arrest warrants, for instance, in cases of bankrupt debtors who have neglected to both fulfill judgments against them and to voluntarily appear in court; the arrest warrants in these cases don't result in detention or confinement, rather they authorize law enforcement to compel the attendance of the debtor to a session of the court, at the conclusion of which they are released.

==== Outstanding arrest warrant ====
An arrest warrant is an "outstanding arrest warrant" when the person named in the warrant has not yet been arrested. A warrant may be outstanding if the person named in the warrant is intentionally evading law enforcement, unaware that there is a warrant out for their arrest, the agency responsible for executing the warrant has a backlog of warrants to serve, or a combination of these factors.

Some jurisdictions have a very high number of outstanding warrants. The vast majority in American jurisdictions are for traffic related (non-violent) citations. The state of California in 1999 had around 2.5 million outstanding warrants, with nearly 1 million of them in the Los Angeles area. The city of Baltimore, Maryland had 100,000 as of 2007. New Orleans, Louisiana had 49,000 in 1996. The state of Texas in 2009 had at least 1.7 million outstanding warrants in the Houston area alone.

Some jurisdictions have laws placing various restrictions on persons with outstanding warrants, such as prohibiting renewal of one's driver's license or obtaining a passport.

== See also ==
- Arrest without warrant
- European Arrest Warrant
- Interpol methodology
- Search warrant
