= Crown Proceedings Act 1947 =

Act of the Parliament of the United Kingdom

Crown Proceedings Act 1947 (Note: Section 47(1).)
- Act of Parliament
- Parliament of the United Kingdom
- Long title: An Act to amend the law relating to the civil liabilities and rights of the Crown and to civil proceedings by and against the Crown, to amend the law relating to the civil liabilities of persons other than the Crown in certain cases involving the affairs or property of the Crown, and for purposes connected with the matters aforesaid.
- Citation: 10 & 11 Geo. 6. c. 44
- Introduced by: Lord Jowitt Lord Chancellor (Lords)
- Territorial extent: England and Wales (Note: Section 52.); Scotland; Northern Ireland (Note: The Crown Proceedings (Northern Ireland) Order 1981 (SI 1981/233))

Dates
- Royal assent: 31 July 1947
- Commencement: 1 January 1948 (Note: Section 47(2). The Crown Proceedings Act 1947 (Commencement) Order 1947 (SR&O 1947/2527).)
Other legislation
Amends	Defence Act 1842; Admiralty Powers, &c. Act 1865; War Department Stores Act 1867; Administration of Justice (Miscellaneous Provisions) Act 1933; Law Reform (Miscellaneous Provisions) (Scotland) Act 1940; Ministers of the Crown (Transfer of Functions) Act 1946
Repeals/revokes	Magna Carta; Crown Debtors Act 1785; Extents in Aid Act 1817; Petitions of Right Act 1860; Admiralty Suits Act 1868; Merchant Shipping (Salvage) Act 1940
Amended by	Statute Law Revision Act 1950; Statute Law Revision Act 1953; Law Reform (Limitation of Actions, etc.) Act 1954; Charities Act 1960; Post Office Act 1969; Animals Act 1971; Administration of Justice Act 1977; Civil Liability (Contribution) Act 1978; Statute Law (Repeals) Act 1981; Senior Courts Act 1981; Armed Forces Act 1981; Law Reform (Miscellaneous Provisions) (Scotland) Act 1985; Debtors (Scotland) Act 1987; Crown Proceedings (Armed Forces) Act 1987; Statute Law (Repeals) Act 1993; Merchant Shipping Act 1995; Private International Law (Miscellaneous Provisions) Act 1995; Scotland Act 1998

Status: Amended

Text of statute as originally enacted

Revised text of statute as amended

Text of the Crown Proceedings Act 1947 as in force today (including any amendments) within the United Kingdom, from legislation.gov.uk.

The Crown Proceedings Act 1947 (10 & 11 Geo. 6. c. 44) is an act of the Parliament of the United Kingdom that allowed, for the first time, civil actions against the Crown to be brought in the same way as against any other party. The act also reasserted the common law doctrine of Crown privilege but by making it, for the first time, justiciable paved the way for the development of the modern law of public interest immunity.

The act received royal assent on 31 July 1947 and came into force on 1 January 1948.

There remain significant differences between Crown proceedings and claims between private parties, especially as to enforcement of judgments.

== Background ==
Before the act, it had not been possible to sue the Crown in court since the 13th century. However, it was seen to be desirable that Crown contractors could obtain redress, as they would otherwise be inhibited from taking on such work, so a petition of right came to be used in such situations, especially after the Petitions of Right Act 1860 (23 & 24 Vict. c. 34) simplified the process.

Before the petition could be heard by the courts, it had to be endorsed with the words fiat justitia (Latin for 'let justice be done') on the advice of the Home Secretary and the Attorney-General.

Similarly, the Crown could not be sued in tort. The usual remedy was for the complainant to sue the public servant responsible for the injury. A famous example was the case of Entick v Carrington. The Crown usually indemnified the servant against any damages.

Henry Brougham called for equality between Crown and subjects in a House of Commons motion in 1828, but the proposal was not realised for another century. Government departments came up with a range of pragmatic devices to mitigate some of the effects of Crown immunity, and although these left many problems unaddressed, many lawyers and politicians believed that the law generally struck a good balance.

In 1921 a Crown Proceedings Committee was established, following a campaign by the legal profession which was also supported by the Law Officers of the Crown. The committee was chaired by Lord Hewart. The committee was deeply divided on whether the Crown should be made liable in tort, but was directed by the Lord Chancellor to draft a bill on the assumption that such liability was desirable, leaving the political decision to the Government once the bill was prepared. The Committee produced a draft Bill in 1927. However, little was done to progress it through Parliament due to opposition within the Government (primarily from the Admiralty and Viscount Hailsham).

In the 1940s, there was adverse criticism of the state of affairs from the House of Lords and the Court of Appeal. There was also political pressure on the Labour government from the trade unions, who feared that Crown immunity would severely affect the rights of workers in nationalised industries. The Lord Chancellor, Lord Jowitt, also believed that it was politically important to demonstrate that the Labour government was committed to maintaining the rights of citizens against the state. The result was that the Act was made a priority, and it passed through Parliament in 1947 with little controversy and to general acclaim.

== Provisions ==
=== Actions allowed ===
Section 1 of the act allows claims, for which a petition of right would previously have been demanded, to be brought in the courts directly as against any other defendant. However, a petition and fiat still appear to be necessary for personal claims against the monarch.

Section 2 renders the Crown liable as though it were a natural person for:

- torts committed by its servants and agents;
- common law duties of an employer to its servants and agents; and
- common law duties as an owner or occupier of property.

Section 2(2) provides that the Crown is liable for breach of statutory duty so long as the statute binds both the Crown and private persons.

Section 3 provides for the protection of patents, registered trade marks, design rights and copyrights from breach by Crown servants.

=== Limitations ===
Section 2(5) exempts the Crown from liability for any person exercising "responsibilities of a judicial nature". This means, for example, that a claim under the Human Rights Act 1998 may not be brought against the Crown with respect to judicial decisions, unless it is brought within a right of appeal according to Section 9 of that act.

Section 10 exempted the Crown from actions for death or personal injury caused by members of the British Armed Forces to other members of the British Armed Forces. This section was suspended by the Crown Proceedings (Armed Forces) Act 1987, sections 1 and 2 with a power for the Secretary of State for Defence to revive it when "necessary and expedient". There was some retrospective litigation after the 1987 act in which a declaration was made under the Human Rights Act 1998, section 4 that such immunity was compatible with the European Convention on Human Rights, article 6(1).

=== Crown privilege and public interest immunity ===
Section 28 gave the courts, for the first time, the power to order disclosure of documents by the Crown and require the Crown to answer requests for further information. This new power is subject to the important qualification in s. 28(2) that the Crown can resist disclosure where this could be "injurious to the public interest". This reasserted the traditional doctrine of Crown privilege but also made the issue justiciable, ultimately giving rise to the doctrine of public-interest immunity.

Section 38(3) states that references to the monarch in their private capacity are to be construed as including the monarch in right of the Duchy of Lancaster and the Duke of Cornwall. A subsequent law officers' opinion stated that "the same principles which render an Act of Parliament inapplicable to the Crown unless the Crown is expressly named, apply also to the Prince of Wales in his capacity as the Duke of Cornwall". Several other laws contain references to this section stating that they do not bind the monarch in his private capacity within the meaning of section 38(3) of the Crown Proceedings Act 1947. This includes:

- The Terrorist Asset-Freezing etc. Act 2010 (repealed)
- The Cluster Munitions (Prohibitions) Act 2010
- The Counter-Terrorism Act 2008
- The Safeguarding Vulnerable Groups Act 2006
- The Pensions Act 2004
- The Traffic Management Act 2004
- The Licensing Act 2003
- The Export Control Act 2002
- The Water Industry (Scotland) Act 2002
- The Transport Act 2000
- The Competition Act 1998
- The Nuclear Explosions (Prohibition and Inspections) Act 1998
- The Landmines Act 1998
- The Pensions (Northern Ireland) Order 1995 and the Pensions Act 1995
- The Environment Act 1995
- The Radioactive Substances Act 1993
- The Railways Act 1993
- The Water Resources Act 1991
- The Water Industry Act 1991
- The Medical Act 1983
- The Environmental Protection Act 1990
- The Food Safety Act 1990
- The Reservoirs Act 1975
- The Health and Safety at Work etc. Act 1974
- The Animals Act 1971
- The Administration of Justice Act 1970
- Several statutory instruments

=== Proceedings abolished ===
Apart from petitions of right, the act abolished several ancient writs and procedures:

- informations, in Latin or English;
- writs of capias ad respondendum, subpoena ad respondendum and writs of appraisement;
- writs of scire facias;
- proceedings for the determination of any issue upon a writ of extent or of diem clausit extremum;
- writs of summons under Part V of the Crown Suits Act 1865;
- proceedings against the Crown by way of Anglo-Norman: monstrans de droit.

== Amendments since royal assent ==
Sections 5 to 8 originally covered Admiralty claims but these sections were repealed and replaced by provisions under the Merchant Shipping Act 1995.

Section 9 originally excluded claims arising from the operations of the Post Office, including telegraphic and telephone services, other than the loss or damage of a registered letter. These provisions were repealed and replaced by the Post Office Act 1969.

=== Crown Proceedings (Armed Forces) Act 1987 ===
Crown Proceedings (Armed Forces) Act 1987 (Note: Section 5(1).)
- Act of Parliament
- Parliament of the United Kingdom
- Long title: An Act to repeal section 10 of the Crown Proceedings Act 1947 and to provide for the revival of that section in certain circumstances.
- Citation: 1987 c. 25
- Territorial extent: United Kingdom (Note: Section 5(3).)

Dates
- Royal assent: 15 May 1987
- Commencement: 15 May 1987 (Note: Section 4(b) of the Interpretation Act 1978.)
Other legislation
Amends	Crown Proceedings Act 1947

Status: Current legislation

Text of statute as originally enacted

Revised text of statute as amended

Text of the Crown Proceedings Act 1947 as in force today (including any amendments) within the United Kingdom, from legislation.gov.uk.

Section 10 originally excluded claims arising from the operations of the Armed Forces, however this was repealed by the Crown Proceedings (Armed Forces) Act 1987 (c. 25), except in limited and specific situations.

== Bibliography ==
- Bradley, A. W.; Ewing, K. D. (2003). Constitutional and Administrative Law (13th ed.). London: Pearson. ISBN 0-582-43807-1.
- Jaffe, L. L. (1965). Judicial Control of Administrative Action. London: Little Brown. pp. pp198–212.
- Street, H. (1948). "Crown Proceedings Act, 1947". Modern Law Review. 11 (2): 129–142. doi:10.1111/j.1468-2230.1948.tb00078.x.
- Arvind, T. T. (2013). "Restraining the State through Tort? The Crown Proceedings Act in Retrospect". In Arvind, T. T.; Steele, Jenny (eds.). Tort Law and the Legislature. Hart.
