= Crown proceedings =

In English law, Crown proceedings are legal proceedings which involve the Crown, and this would include all government departments.

Proceedings commenced by or against the Crown are governed by the Crown Proceedings Act 1947, and procedurally by Part 66 of the Civil Procedure Rules 1998.

In particular, judgments against the Crown cannot be enforced in the usual way.

== See also ==
- Sovereign immunity
