= Pinxit =

Amendment added to signature depiction

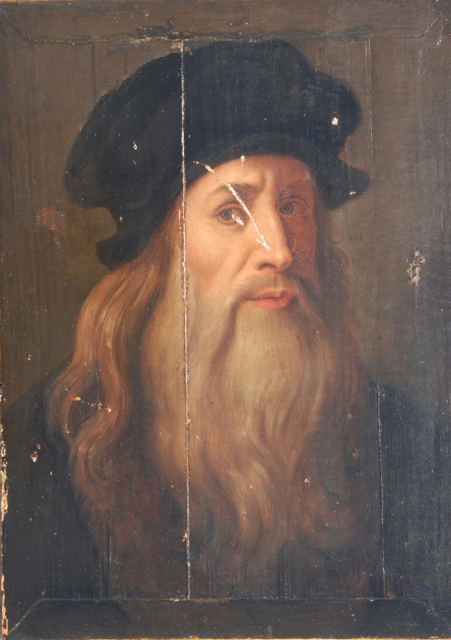
Attributed to Cristofano dell'Altissimo or Leonardo da Vinci - Portrait of a man, signed Pinxit Mea

Pinxit (from Latin: 'one painted') is a stylized amendment added to the signature depiction of the name of the person responsible for a work of art, found conventionally in the Late Middle Ages and the Renaissance. It is sometimes abbreviated P, PIN, or PINX, as in some paintings by Raphael. The locution me pinxit is found on a 12th-century crucifix, not in a sense connected to individual authorship but rather as a more impersonal devotional statement, a "pious [formula] appropriate for liturgical gifts".

Its use by Duccio c. 1255–1260 – c. 1318–1319) on the Maestà in Siena Cathedral is seen as an "audacious" claim by the author, who asserts an individual status on a par with that of the city. By the Late Middle Ages in Venice and elsewhere pinxit (or other forms of pingere, in Gothic lettering) had become customary, and was often found on a cartellino, "any form of fictive paper carrying an inscription", established in Venice by the 1440s. Other verbs used to establish authorship include conjugations of facere ("to make"; fecit ("made by") was frequently used by Titian) or fingere ("to conceive").

In 18th century New Spain, artists increasingly included pinxit Mexici (painted in Mexico) on works bound for the European market as a sign of pride in their artistic tradition.

== Latin ==
pinxit is the third-person singular perfect active indicative of pingō, with the meanings: I decorate or embellish; I paint, tint or colour; I portray.
