= Petitions of Right Act 1860 =

Act of the Parliament of the United Kingdom

Petitions of Right Act 1860 (Note: Section 17.)
- Act of Parliament
- Parliament of the United Kingdom
- Long title: An Act to amend the law relating to Petitions of Right, to simplify the Proceedings, and to make Provisions for the Costs thereof.
- Citation: 23 & 24 Vict. c. 34
- Territorial extent: United Kingdom

Dates
- Royal assent: 3 July 1860
- Commencement: 3 July 1860 (Note: The Acts of Parliament (Commencement) Act 1793.)
- Repealed: 1 January 1948 (Note: The Crown Proceedings Act 1947 (Commencement) Order 1947 (SR&O 1947/2527).)
Other legislation
Amended by	Statute Law Revision and Civil Procedure Act 1881
Repealed by	Crown Proceedings Act 1947

Status: Repealed

Text of statute as originally enacted

The Petitions of Right Act 1860 (23 & 24 Vict. c. 34) was an act of the Parliament of the United Kingdom that codified and simplified the process of obtaining a petition of right.

== Procedure ==
The act preserved the right to proceed at common law, but gave an alternative remedy. The procedure was regulated by the act, and in England also by rules made under the act on 1 February 1862. The petition was left with the Home Secretary "for the consideration of His Majesty", who if he thought fit granted his fiat that right be done. The fiat was sealed in the Home Office and issued to the applicant who filed it in the central office of the High Court of Justice, and a sealed copy was served on the Treasury Solicitor, with a demand for a response on behalf of the Crown. The subsequent proceedings, including those as to disclosing relevant documents followed as far as possible those in an ordinary action. A judgment in favour of the applicant was equivalent to a judgment of amoveas manus ouster le main.

Costs were payable to and by the Crown. A petition of right was usually tried in the Chancery or King's Bench divisions but where the subject-matter of the petition arose out of the exercise of belligerent rights on behalf of the Crown, or would be heard in a prize court if the matter were in dispute between private persons, the applicant could at his option start his petition in the Admiralty Court. The Lord Chancellor could direct the hearing of petitions of right in that court even when not started there.

== Territorial extent ==
Petitions of Right (Ireland) Act 1873 (Note: Section 1.)
- Act of Parliament
- Parliament of the United Kingdom
- Long title: An Act to provide for proceeding on Petitions of Right in the Courts of Law and Equity in Ireland.
- Citation: 36 & 37 Vict. c. 69
- Territorial extent: United Kingdom

Dates
- Royal assent: 5 August 1873
- Commencement: 5 August 1873
- Repealed: 1 January 1950
Other legislation
Repealed by	Northern Ireland Crown Proceedings Order 1949

Status: Repealed

Text of statute as originally enacted

The act applied only to England and Wales but was extended to Ireland by the Petitions of Right (Ireland) Act 1873 (36 & 37 Vict. c. 69).

== Subsequent developments ==
The whole act was repealed by section 39(1) of, and the second schedule to, the Crown Proceedings Act 1947 (10 & 11 Geo. 6. c. 44), which came into force on 1 January 1948.

The 1947 act ultimately allowed claims to be brought against the Crown as against any other party and throughout the UK, rendering the act and process obsolete.

== Bibliography ==
- The Public General Statutes passed in the Twenty-third & Twenty-fourth Years of the Reign of Her Majesty Queen Victoria. London: Eyre & Spottiswoode. 1860. pp. 207–214.
- Bradley, A.W. & Ewing, K.D. (2003). Constitutional and Administrative Law (13th ed.). London: Longman. ISBN 0-582-43807-1., pp770-771
