= Hoehne, Colorado =

Census-designated place in Las Animas County, CO, USA

- Census-designated place
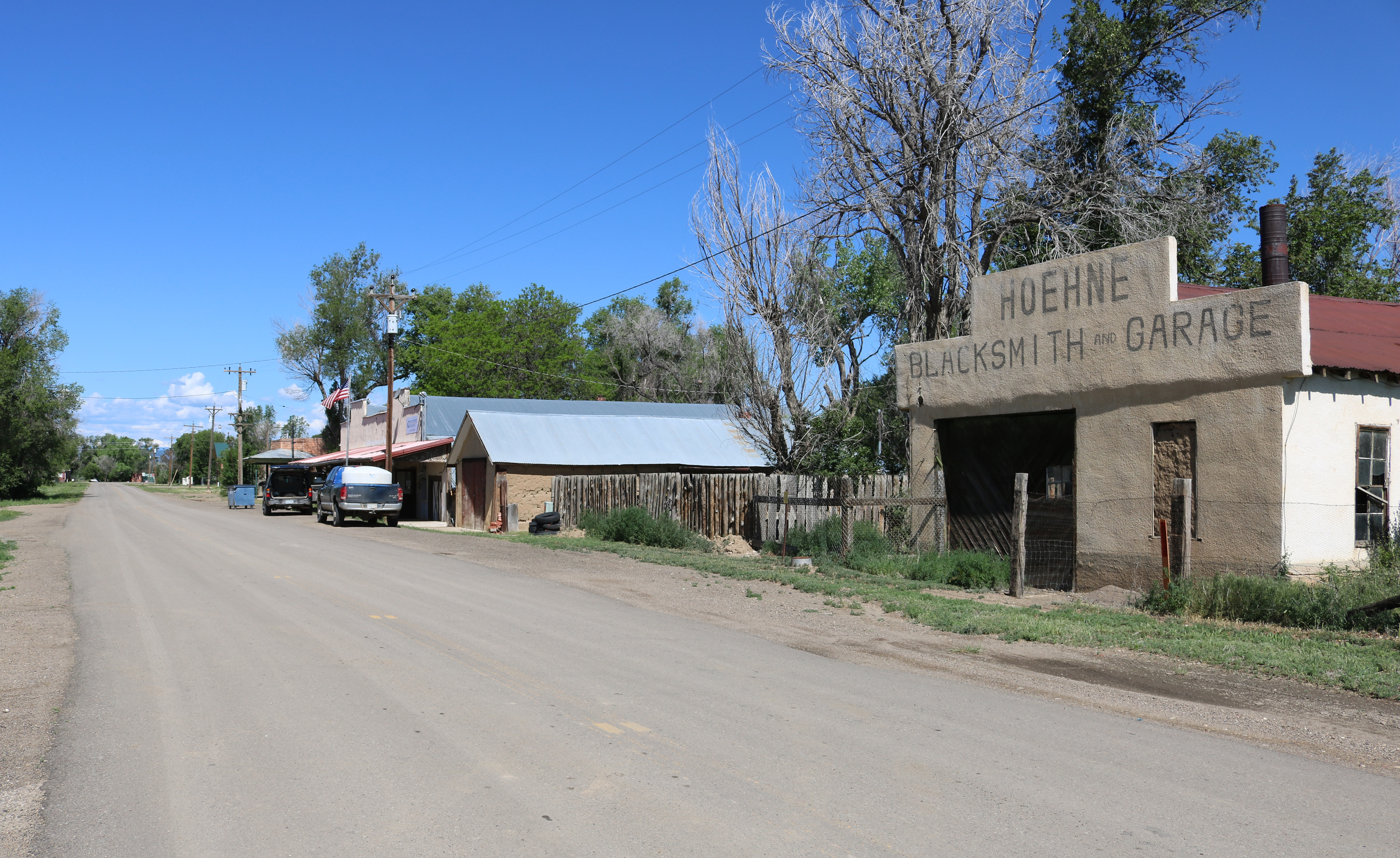
- County Road 40.6 in Hoehne.

- Location of the Hoehne CDP in Las Animas County, Colorado
- Coordinates: 37°17′16″N 104°22′42″W
- Country: United States
- State: Colorado
- County: Las Animas County
- Founded: 1859

Government
  - Type: unincorporated town

Area
  - Total: 3.107 sq mi (8.046 km^{2})
  - Land: 3.107 sq mi (8.046 km^{2})
  - Water: 0 sq mi (0.000 km^{2})
- Elevation: 5,738 ft (1,749 m)

Population (2020)
  - Total: 80
  - Density: 26/sq mi (9.9/km^{2})
- Time zone: UTC-7 (MST)
  - Summer (DST): UTC-6 (MDT)
- ZIP Code: 81046
- Area code: 719
- GNIS feature ID: 2583247

Hoehne is an unincorporated town, a post office, and a census-designated place (CDP) located in and governed by Las Animas County, Colorado, United States. At the United States Census 2020, the population of the Hoehne CDP was 80.

== History ==
Hoehne was founded by German immigrant William Hoehne in 1859 in what was then the Territory of New Mexico. He is credited with founding the Hoehne Ditch Company and introducing the first mill and threshing machine into the area. William Hoehne farmed 1,000 acres (400 ha), planting strawberries, apples, and cherries. Hoehne is still a farming community, but the focus has shifted from fruits to alfalfa and grass hay.

The population of Hoehne today is around 80 people. But during its heyday, the town boasted a hotel, a train depot called "Hoehnes", a blacksmith, a Catholic church, and several stores. The train depot was retired in 1967 and was moved twice - the second time to its current location in Texas Creek, where it was restored to its original condition. The Hoehne train depot sign is still visible today at the original depot location.

Hoehne is located near the Santa Fe Trail, and a historical marker is located approximately one mile north of the town on County Road 42.0.

== Geography ==
Hoehne is located in west-central Las Animas County on high ground north of the Purgatoire River. It is 11 miles (18 km) northeast of Trinidad, the county seat.

The Hoehne CDP has an area of 1,988 acres (8.046 km^{2}), all land.

== Demographics ==
The United States Census Bureau initially defined the Hoehne CDP for the United States Census 2010.

Hoehne CDP, Colorado
Year	Pop.	±%
2010	111	—
2020	80	−27.9%
Source: United States Census Bureau

== Notable residents ==
- Ventura Tenario, known as Chief Little Wolf, professional wrestler

== See also ==
- Colorado cities and towns
