= Fiat justitia ruat caelum =

Latin phrase

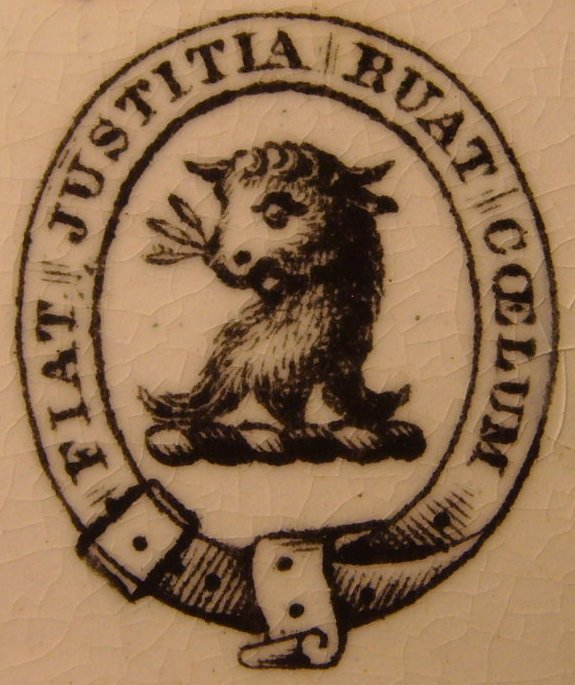
Crest of the family of Joseph Drew of Weymouth, Dorset, 1870. Variant spelling cœlum.

Fīat iūstitia ruat cælum is a Latin legal phrase, meaning "Let justice be done though the heavens fall." The maxim signifies the belief that justice must be realized regardless of consequences. According to the 19th-century abolitionist politician Charles Sumner, it does not come from any classical source, though others have ascribed it to Lucius Calpurnius Piso Caesoninus.

The concept is cited in Somerset v Stewart.

== Classical forms ==
=== Ancient metaphor of the falling sky ===
The falling sky clause occurs in a passage of Heauton Timorumenos, by Terence, suggesting that it was a common saying in his time. In the scene, Syrus suggests a scheme through which Clinia might deceive another into taking actions that would further his love interests. Syrus lays out his plan, while Clinia, who must act it out, finds faults with it, finally asking, "Is that sufficient? If his father should come to know of it, pray, what then?" To which Syrus replies, "Quid si redeo ad illos qui aiunt, 'Quid si nunc cœlum ruat?' (transl. What if I have recourse to those who say, 'What now if the sky were to fall?')", the suggestion being that Clinia has no other options available, so to worry that the plan will, obviously, fail if the father finds out makes no more sense than worrying about the fact that it will also fail if the world were to suddenly end.

This concern recalls a passage in Arrian's Campaigns of Alexander, Book I, 4, where ambassadors of the Celtae from the Adriatic sea, tall men of haughty demeanor, upon being asked by Alexander what in the world they feared most, answered that their worst fear was that the sky might fall on their heads. Alexander, who hoped to hear himself named, was disappointed by an answer that implied that nothing within human power could hurt them, short of a total destruction of nature.

In a similar vein, Theognis of Megara urges "May the great broad sky of bronze fall on my head / (That fear of earth-born men) if I am not / A friend to those who love me, and a pain / And irritation to my enemies." Whereas Aristotle asserts in his Physics, B. IV, that it was the early notion of ignorant nations that the sky was supported on the shoulders of Atlas, and that when he let go of it, it would fall.

On the other hand, Horace opens one of his odes with a depiction of a Stoic hero who will submit to the ruin of the universe around him: "Si fractus illabatur orbis, / impavidum ferient ruinae (transl. Should the whole frame of Nature round him break, / In ruin and confusion hurled, / He, unconcerned, would hear the mighty crack, / And stand secure amidst a falling world.)

=== Seneca: "Piso's justice" ===
In De Ira (On Anger), Book I, Chapter XVIII, Seneca tells of Gnaeus Calpurnius Piso, a Roman governor and lawmaker, when he was angry, ordering the execution of a soldier who had returned from a leave of absence without his comrade, on the grounds that if the man did not produce his companion, he had presumably killed the latter. As the condemned man was presenting his neck to the executioner's sword, there suddenly appeared the very comrade who was supposedly murdered. The centurion overseeing the execution halted the proceedings and led the condemned man back to Piso, expecting a reprieve. But Piso mounted the tribunal in a rage, and ordered the three soldiers to be executed. He ordered the death of the man who was to have been executed, because the sentence had already been passed; he also ordered the death of the centurion who was in charge of the original execution, for failing to perform his duty; and finally, he ordered the death of the man who had been supposed to have been murdered, because he had been the cause of the death of two innocent men.

In subsequent versions of this legend, this principle became known as "Piso's justice", a term that characterizes sentences that are carried out or passed from retaliation—whose intentions are theoretically defensible, but technically and morally wrong—and this could be construed as a negative interpretation of the meaning of Fīat iūstitia ruat cælum according to Brewer's entry on Seneca. However, the phrase Fīat iūstitia ruat cælum does not appear in De Ira; and, in fact, Seneca used the story as an example of anger leading people to ignore right and do wrong, as Piso's decisions trampled on several legal principles, particularly that of Corpus delicti, which states that a person cannot be convicted of a crime unless it can be proven that the crime was even committed. Piso's verdict could never be an example of justice because of these fatal flaws: he could not charge a suspect with murder because he lacked physical, demonstrative and testimonial evidence to establish that the missing individual has indeed died (the physical body of the deceased being the most important of these absences).

Piso was put to trial a short time after this episode, accused of a long list of crimes, and committed suicide. Among the charges brought against him was summary judgment, the crime of sentencing a suspect with undue haste and without proper investigation, thus ignoring the legal procedures of justice.

The phrase is sometimes attributed to a different Piso, Lucius Calpurnius Piso Caesoninus, possibly a confusion with this case.

== Modern origins ==
The exact phrase as used for approval of justice at all cost—usually seen in a positive sense—appears to originate in modern jurisprudence, but it is really an adaptation of the motto of Ferdinand I, Holy Roman Emperor, Fiat iustitia, et pereat mundus: "Let justice be done, though the world perish". In English law, William Watson in "Ten Quodlibetical Quotations Concerning Religion and State" (1601) wrote "You go against that general maxim in the laws, which is 'Fiat justitia et ruant coeli.'" This is its first known appearance in English literature.

The maxim was used by William Prynne in "Fresh Discovery of Prodigious Wandering New-Blazing Stars" (1646), by Nathaniel Ward in "Simple Cobbler of Agawam" (1647), and frequently thereafter, but it was given its widest celebrity by William Murray, 1st Baron Mansfield's 1772 decision in Somerset v Stewart, in which, impatient that the contesting counsels would not settle the case amongst themselves, Mansfield tells them "If the parties will have judgment, fiat justitia, ruat cœlum, let justice be done whatever be the consequences." Another famous eighteenth-century usage appears in David Hume's 1748 essay "Of Passive Obedience". Hume rejects it as false, although he argues that justice must in extraordinary cases of necessity be sacrificed to the public interest.

Picking up on its usage in both Hume's essay and the Somerset decision, Henry David Thoreau deployed it in his Civil Disobedience, expanding the concept "in which a people, as well as an individual, must do justice, cost what it may."

In 1860 this maxim was placed on the flag of the Alamo City Guards Texas Militia.

The maxim is given in various forms:

- Fiat justitia, ruat cœlum/coelum/cælum/caelum (spellings)
- Fiat justitia et ruant coeli (Watson)
- Fiat justitia et coelum ruat (John Manningham, Diary, 11 April 1603)
- Fiat justitia, ruat cœlum (Mansfield)

== Notable modern uses ==
In British India, this phrase was used by Sir S. Subramania Iyer during a case ("Tirupati (or Tirupathi) Mahant case") in Madras High Court. It was a case regarding religious faith versus the law, where a Hindu Temple administrator (called the 'mahant') was accused by the high priest of misappropriation of donations, replacing a vessel full of gold with base metals, like copper and placing it beneath the flagstaff of the temple. The barrister representing the high priest used this phrase in his speech to justify digging up the flagstaff to check the vessel. More recently, Judge James Edwin Horton referred to the maxim when he recalled his decision to overturn the conviction of Haywood Patterson in the infamous Scottsboro Boys trial. In 1933, Judge Horton set aside the death sentence of Patterson, one of nine black men who were wrongfully convicted of raping two white women in Alabama. Horton quoted the phrase when explaining why he made his decision, even though he knew it would mean the end of his judicial career.

Joseph Conrad's 1899 novella Heart of Darkness contains a possible reference to the maxim at the very end of the text. The protagonist Marlow says, "It seemed to me that the house would collapse before I could escape, that the heavens would fall upon my head. But nothing happened. The heavens do not fall for such a trifle."

George Eliot has Mr. Brooke mangle and misattribute this phrase in Middlemarch, where he says, "You should read history – look at ostracism, persecution, martyrdom, and that kind of thing. They always happen to the best men, you know. But what is that in Horace?—fiat justitia, ruat ... something or other."

In Oliver Stone's 1991 film JFK, the character of district attorney Jim Garrison during the only trial brought in the murder of President John F. Kennedy declares "Let justice be done, though the heavens fall".

The first lyrics of the Frank Wildhorn musical The Count of Monte Cristo contain this phrase.

In the Better Call Saul episode "Chicanery", the character Chuck McGill utters the phrase "Let justice be done though the heavens fall!" before making an argument to appear in open court in a trial against his brother Jimmy. Jimmy uses the phrase to his receptionist Francesca at the end of the episode "Fun and Games" as he begins a day of work.

In The Boys Season 4, Episode 3, "We'll Keep the Red Flag Flying Here", the saying can be seen engraved at the bottom of the large sculpture of The Seven just outside of their meeting room. In addition, Season 5, Episode 6 is titled “Though the Heavens Fall”.

In the anime series Aldnoah.Zero, the phrase appears several times. Heaven's Fall is the name given to the event in which the Moon exploded, causing massive destruction to the Earth's surface.

The phrase appears in the Judge from Hell a 2024 Korean drama.

== See also ==
- Fiat justitia
- Fiat iustitia, et pereat mundus, a similar phrase
- Henny Penny, or Chicken Little, a folk tale about a chick who believes the sky is falling
