= Fiat justitia =

Latin phrase for a British legal concept

Fiat justitia is a Latin phrase, meaning "Let justice be done". Historically in England, a warrant for a writ of error in Parliament or later a petition of right in the courts could be brought only after the king, or on his behalf the Home Secretary, had endorsed fiat justitia on a petition for such a warrant. It was a means of granting leave to appeal by exercise of the royal prerogative.

== Famous modern uses ==
Fiat Justitia appears at the bottom of the 1835 portrait of Chief Justice of the United States John Marshall by Rembrandt Peale, which hangs in a conference room at the Supreme Court Building in Washington. It is also the motto of Sri Lanka Law College, Richmond County, North Carolina; Jefferson County, New York; University of California College of the Law, San Francisco; the Massachusetts Bar Association, University of Saskatchewan College of Law, and the Supreme Court of Nevada, and appears on the official seals of these institutions.

Fiat Justitia is the motto of Britain's Royal Air Force Police as well as the Eastern Caribbean Supreme Court.

Fiat Justitia also appears as the motto of Nuffield College, Oxford, and the Sri Lanka law college, and is also found in the Holy Bible on the crest of St. Sylvester's College, Kandy, Sri Lanka.

Fiat Justitia is the motto on the town crest of South Molton in North Devon.

== See also ==
- Fiat justitia ruat caelum
- Fiat iustitia, et pereat mundus
