= The Crown =

Political term in the Commonwealth realms

A symbolic representation of the Crown, present on the symbols of many institutions in Commonwealth realms

The Crown is a political concept used in Commonwealth realms, analogous to the concept of the government in legal systems influenced by Roman civil law.

English common law never developed a concept of the state and left supreme executive power with the monarch. The concept of the Crown as a corporation sole developed in the Kingdom of England as a separation of the physical crown and property of the kingdom from the person and personal property of the monarch. It spread through English and later British colonisation, becoming embedded in the legal lexicon of the British dominions. As the dominions gained control over the royal prerogative in the 1930s, the concept evolved such that 'the Crown in right of' each realm and territory acts independently of the other realms and territories.

Depending on the context, it may refer to the entirety of the state or country, the executive government specifically (either of a realm or one of its provinces, states or territories) or only to the monarch and their direct representatives. The Crown as a political concept should not be confused with physical crowns, such as those of the British regalia.

== Definition ==
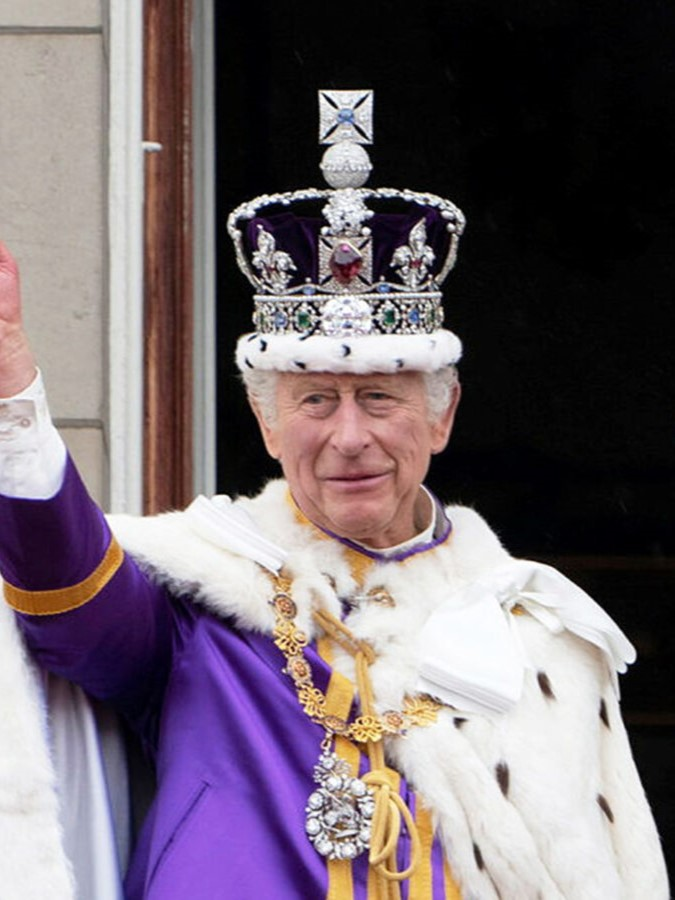
King Charles III (wearing the Imperial State Crown), the living embodiment of the Crown in each of the Commonwealth realms

The term the Crown does not have a single definition. Legal scholars Maurice Sunkin and Sebastian Payne opined, "the nature of the Crown has been taken for granted, in part because it is fundamental and, in part, because many academics have no idea what the term the Crown amounts to". Nicholas Browne-Wilkinson theorised that the Crown is "an amorphous, abstract concept" and, thus, "impossible to define", while William Wade stated the Crown "means simply the Queen".

Warren J. Newman described the Crown as "a useful and convenient means of conveying, in a word, the compendious formal, executive and administrative powers and apparatus attendant upon the modern constitutional and monarchical state."

Lord Simon of Glaisdale stated:

The crown as an object is a piece of jewelled headgear under guard at the Tower of London. But it symbolizes the powers of government which were formerly wielded by the wearer of the crown ... The term "the Crown" is therefore used in constitutional law to denote the collection of such of those powers as remain extant (the royal prerogative), together with such other powers as have been expressly conferred by statute on "the Crown".

Lord Diplock suggested the Crown means "the government [and] all of the ministers and parliamentary secretaries under whose direction the administrative work of the government is carried out by the civil servants employed in the various government departments." This interpretation was supported by section 8 of the Pensions (Colonial Service) Act 1887 (50 & 51 Vict. c. 13), which set the terms "permanent civil service of the state", "permanent civil service of Her Majesty" and "permanent civil service of the Crown" as having the same meaning.

In each Commonwealth realm, the term the Crown, at its broadest, means the government or the polity known as the state, while the sovereign in all realms is the living embodiment of the state, or symbolic personification of the Crown. (Note: In the Canadian context, the monarch has been described by Eugene Forsey as the "symbolic embodiment of the people—not a particular group or interest or party, but the people; the whole people"; his daughter, Helen Forsey, said of his opinion on the Crown, "for him, the essence of the monarchy was its impartial representation of the common interests of the citizenry as a whole, as opposed to those of any particular government." The Department of Canadian Heritage said the Crown serves as the "personal symbol of allegiance, unity, and authority for all Canadians," a concept akin to that expressed by King Louis XIV: "L'État, c'est moi", or, "I am the state". Robertson Davies stated in 1994, "the Crown is the consecrated spirit of Canada", and past Ontario chairman of the Monarchist League of Canada Gary Toffoli opined, "the Queen is the legal embodiment of the state at both the national and the provincial levels [...] She is our sovereign and it is the role of the Queen, recognized by the constitutional law of Canada, to embody the state.") The body of the reigning sovereign thus holds two distinct personas in constant coexistence, an ancient theory of the "King's two bodies"—the body natural (subject to infirmity and death) and the body politic (which never dies). The Crown and the sovereign are "conceptually divisible but legally indivisible [...] The office cannot exist without the office-holder". (Note: As Peter Boyce put it, "the Crown as a concept cannot be disentangled from the person of the monarch, but standard reference to the Crown extends well beyond the Queen's person.") This theory is the basis of the immediate succession of the new British monarch upon the death of his or her predecessor; whilst the body natural may have passed, the body politic lives on.

The terms the Crown, the Crown in Right of [jurisdiction], His Majesty the King in Right of [jurisdiction], and similar, are all synonymous and the monarch's legal personality is sometimes referred to simply as the relevant jurisdiction's name. In countries using systems of government derived from Roman civil law, the state is the equivalent concept. However, the terms the sovereign or monarch and the Crown, though related, have different meanings: the Crown includes both the monarch and the government.

The Crown also represents the legal embodiment of executive, legislative, and judicial governance. While the Crown's legal personality is usually regarded as a corporation sole, it can, at least for some purposes, be described as a corporation aggregate headed by the monarch. Frederic William Maitland argued the Crown is a corporation aggregate embracing the government and the "whole political community". J.G. Allen preferred to view the Crown as a corporation sole; one office occupied by a single person, enduring "through generations of incumbents and, historically, lends coherence to a network of other institutions of a similar nature." Canadian academic Philippe Lagassé found the crown "acts in various capacities, as such: crown-in-council (executive); crown-in-parliament (legislative); crown-in-court (judicial). It is also an artificial person and office as a corporation sole. At its most basic, 'the Crown' is, in the UK and other Commonwealth realms, what in most other countries is 'the state'."

== History ==
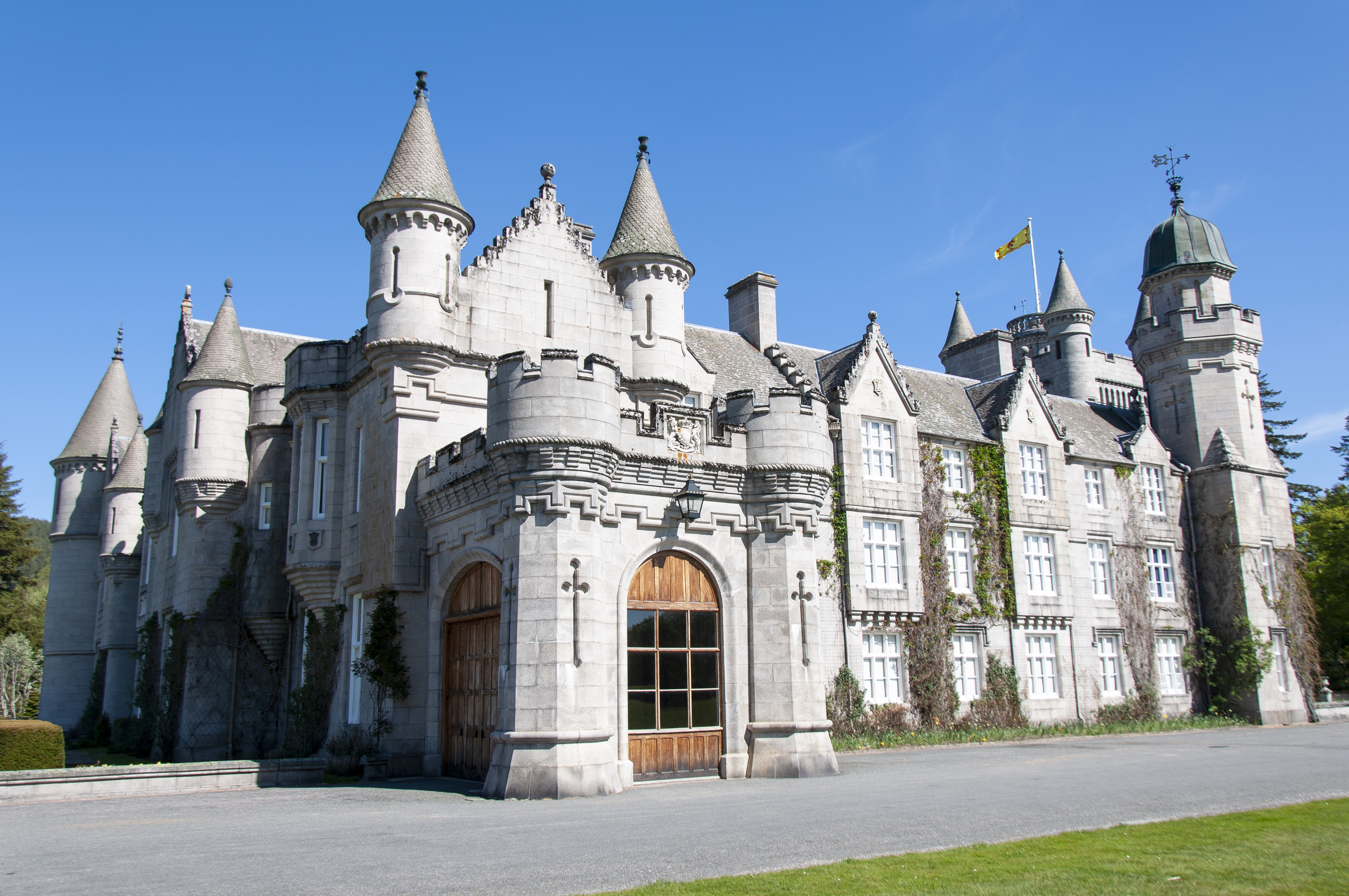
Balmoral Castle in Aberdeenshire, Scotland, a privately owned property of Charles III and not property of the Crown

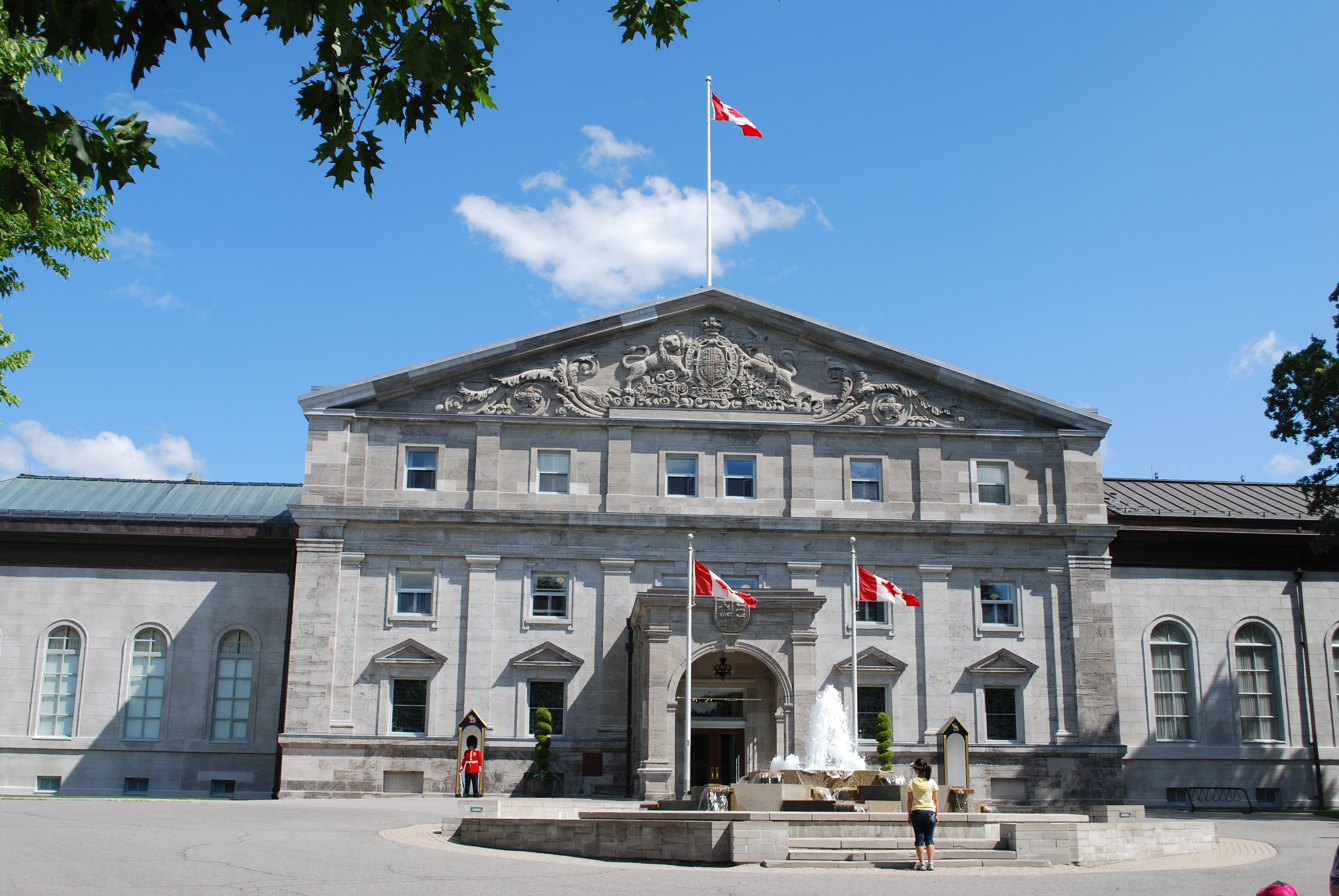
Rideau Hall in Ottawa, Ontario; the seat of the governor general of Canada and a property of the Crown in Right of Canada

The concept of the Crown took form under the feudal system. Though not used this way in all countries that had this system, in England, all rights and privileges were ultimately bestowed by the ruler. Land, for instance, was granted by the Crown to lords in exchange for feudal services and they, in turn, granted the land to lesser lords. One exception to this was common socage: owners of land held as socage held it subject only to the crown. When such lands become ownerless, they are said to escheat; i.e. return to direct ownership of the Crown (Crown land). Bona vacantia is the royal prerogative by which unowned property, primarily unclaimed inheritances, becomes the property of the Crown. (Note: Jurisdictions in which this prerogative does not apply include Cornwall, where unowned property becomes the property of the duke of Cornwall, and Lancashire, where it becomes the property of the duke of Lancaster.)

As such, the physical crown and the property belonging to successive monarchs in perpetuity came to be separated from the person of the monarch and his or her private property. After several centuries of the monarch personally exercising supreme legislative, executive, and judicial power, these functions decreased as parliaments, ministries, and courts grew through the 13th century. The term the Crown then developed into a means by which to differentiate the monarch's official functions from his personal choices and actions. Even within medieval England, there was the doctrine of capacities separating the person of the king from his actions in the capacity of monarch.

The Crown was first defined as an 'imperial' crown during the reign of Henry VIII in the Ecclesiastical Appeals Act 1532 which declared that 'this realm of England is an empire ... governed by one Supreme Head and King having the dignity and royal estate of the imperial Crown of the same'. In William Blackstone's 1765 Commentaries on the Laws of England, he explained that "the meaning therefore of the legislature, when it uses these terms of empire and imperial, and applies them to the realm and crown of England, is only to assert that our king is equally sovereign and independent within these his dominions, as any emperor is in his empire; and owes no kind of subjection to any other potentate on earth."

When the Kingdom of England merged with those of Scotland and Ireland, the concept extended into the legal lexicons of the United Kingdom and its dependencies and overseas territories and, eventually, all of the independent Commonwealth realms.

== Functions ==
=== Executive government ===
The institution and powers of the Crown are formally vested in the king, but, conventionally, its functions are exercised in the sovereign's name by ministers of the Crown (Note: Executives who are themselves servants of the Crown.) drawn from and responsible to the elected chamber of parliament.

The king or queen is the employer of all government officials and staff (including the viceroys, judges, members of the armed forces, police officers, and parliamentarians), (Note: The Supreme Court found in the 1980 case Attorney General of Quebec v. Labrecque that civil servants in Canada are not contracted by an abstraction called the state, but, rather, they are employed by the monarch, who "enjoys a general capacity to contract in accordance with the rule of ordinary law.") the guardian of foster children (Crown wards), as well as the owner of all Crown land (public land or state land in other countries), buildings and equipment (Crown property), state-owned companies (Crown corporations or Crown entities), and the copyright for government publications (Crown copyright). This is all in his or her position as sovereign, not as an individual; all such property is held by the Crown in perpetuity and cannot be sold by the sovereign without the proper advice and consent of his or her relevant ministers. Should the monarch abdicate, all such property would remain with the Crown and come under the ownership of their successor.

=== Legislative ===
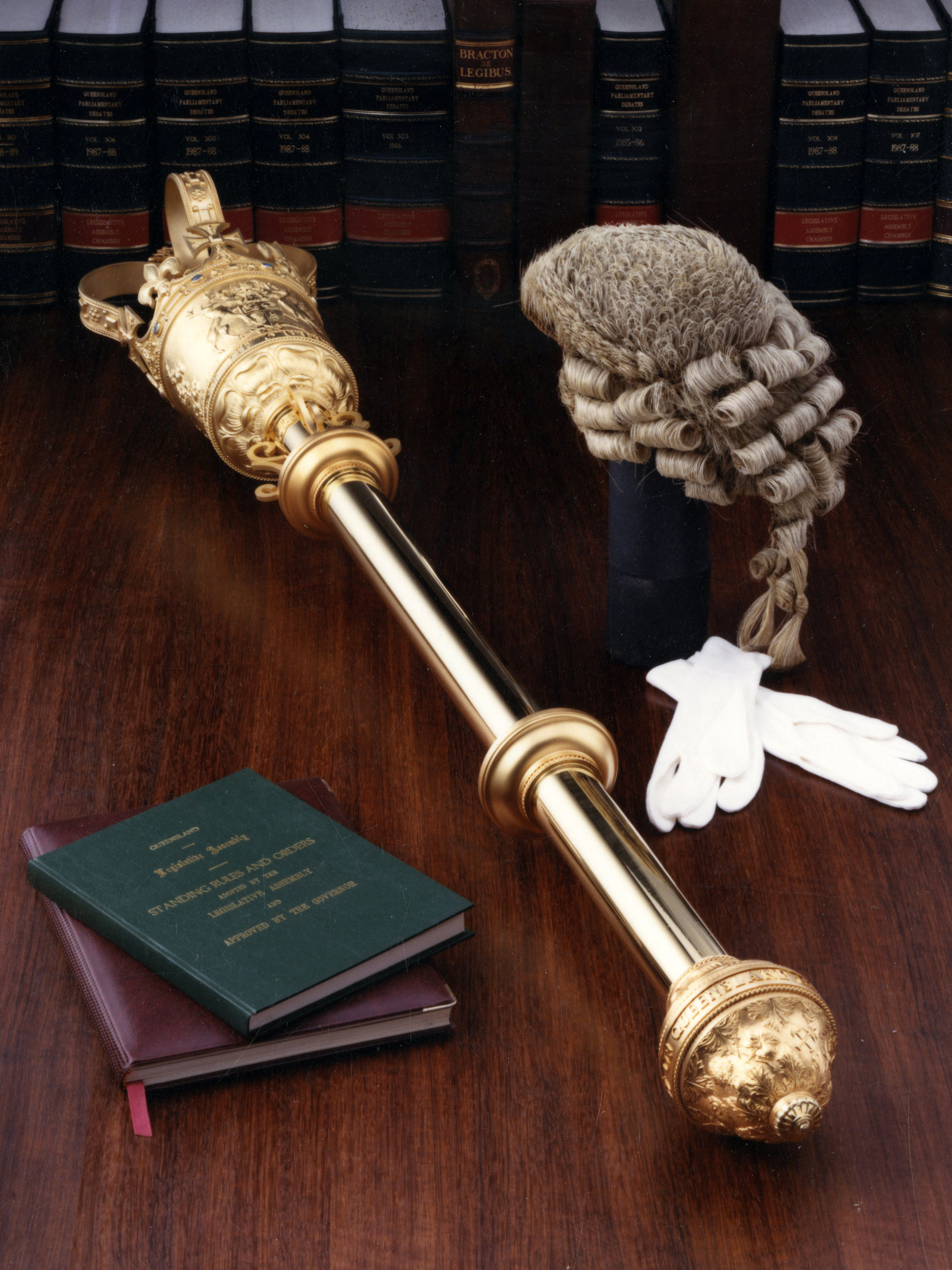
The mace of the Parliament of Queensland, symbolising the authority of parliament as derived from the Crown.

The concept of the Crown as a part of parliament is related to the idea of the fusion of powers, meaning that the executive branch and legislative branch of government are fused together. This is a key concept of the Westminster system of government, developed in England and used in countries in the Commonwealth of Nations and beyond. It is in contradistinction to the idea of the separation of powers.

In Commonwealth realms that are federations, the concept of the King in parliament applies within that specific parliament only, as each sub-national parliament is considered separate and distinct from each other and from the federal parliaments (such as Australian states or the Canadian provinces).

=== Justice ===
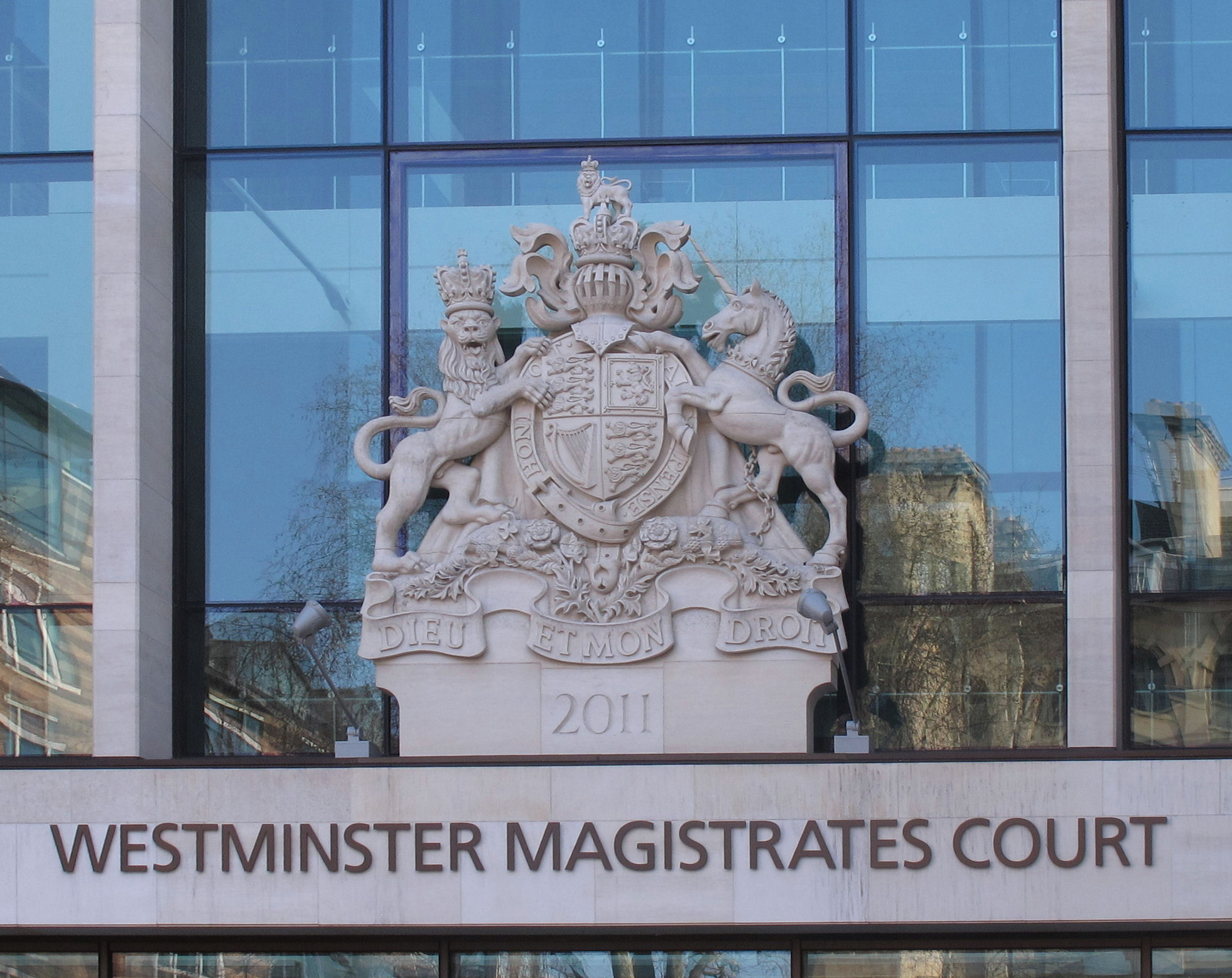
The coat of arms of the sovereign of the United Kingdom on the Westminster Magistrates' Court building in London, England

The King is the 'fountain of justice'. In criminal proceedings, the Crown is the prosecuting party (led by a Crown prosecutor, or Crown attorney in parts of Canada); the case is usually designated (in case citation) as R v [defendant], where R can stand for either rex (if the current monarch is male) or regina (if the monarch is female), and the v stands for versus. For example, a criminal case against Smith might be referred to as R v Smith and verbally read as "the Crown against Smith".

The Crown is, in general, immune to prosecution and civil lawsuits. So, R is rarely (albeit sometimes (Note: For exceptions in the United Kingdom, see Crown Proceedings Act 1947)) seen on the right hand side of the 'v' in the first instance. To pursue a case against alleged unlawful activity by the government, a case in judicial review is brought by the Crown against a minister of the Crown on the application of a claimant. The titles of these cases now follow the pattern of R (on the application of [X]) v [Y], notated as R ([X]) v [Y], for short. Thus, R (Miller) v Secretary of State for Exiting the European Union is R (on the application of Miller and other) v Secretary of State for Exiting the European Union, where "Miller" is Gina Miller, a citizen. Until the end of the 20th century, such case titles used the pattern R v Secretary of State for Exiting the European Union, ex parte Miller. Either form may be abbreviated R (Miller) v Secretary of State for Exiting the European Union.

In Scotland, criminal prosecutions are undertaken by the Lord Advocate (or the relevant procurator fiscal) in the name of the Crown. Accordingly, the abbreviation HMA is used in the High Court of Justiciary for His/Her Majesty's Advocate, in place of rex or regina; as in, HMA v Al Megrahi and Fahima.

Most jurisdictions in Australia use R or The King (or The Queen) in criminal cases. If the Crown is the respondent to an appeal, the words The King will be spelled out, instead of using the abbreviation R (i.e. the case name at trial would be R v Smith; if the defendant appeals against the Crown, the case name would be Smith v The King). In Western Australia and Tasmania, prosecutions will be brought in the name of the respective state instead of the Crown (e.g. The State of Western Australia v Smith). Victorian trials in the original jurisdiction will be brought in the name of the director of public prosecutions. The Commonwealth director of public prosecutions may choose which name to bring the proceeding in. Judges usually refer to the prosecuting party as simply "the prosecution" in the text of judgments. In civil cases where the Crown is a party, it is a customary to list the body politic (e.g. State of Queensland or Commonwealth of Australia) or the appropriate government minister as the party, instead. When a case is announced in court, the clerk or bailiff may refer to the Crown orally as our sovereign lord the king (or our sovereign lady the queen).

In reporting on court proceedings in New Zealand, news reports will refer to the prosecuting lawyer (often called a Crown prosecutor, as in Canada and the United Kingdom) as representing the Crown; usages such as, "for the Crown, Joe Bloggs argued", being common.

The Crown can also be a plaintiff or defendant in civil actions to which the government of the Commonwealth realm in question is a party. Such crown proceedings are often subject to specific rules and limitations, such as the enforcement of judgments against the Crown. Qui tam lawsuits on behalf of the Crown were once common, but have been unusual since the Common Informers Act 1951 ended the practice of allowing such suits by common informers.

== Divisibility of the Crown ==
Historically, the Crown was considered to be indivisible and the sovereign was advised only by their ministers in the United Kingdom. However, as the self-governing dominions of the British Commonwealth gained control over the exercise of the royal prerogative in the 1930s, this concept has evolved such that "the Crown in right of" each realm and territory acts independently of the other realms and territories.

The Balfour Declaration of 1926 recognised the dominions as "autonomous Communities within the British Empire, equal in status, in no way subordinate one to another in any aspect of their domestic or external affairs, though united by a common allegiance to the Crown, and freely associated as members of the British Commonwealth of Nations." The Statute of Westminster 1931, enshrined in law in the United Kingdom, Canada and Australia (though repealed in New Zealand under the Constitution Act 1986), recognised "a common allegiance to the Crown" in its preamble and established a constitutional convention that any "alteration in the law touching the Succession to the Throne or the Royal Style and Titles" would require the assent of each of the dominion parliaments as well as the UK Parliament. (Note: The convention requiring parliamentary assent from each realm to a change in the royal style and titles was created when a uniform single title existed for the British monarch. However, with the accession of Elizabeth II in 1952, this was replaced by an agreement that each realm would pass its own Royal Style and Titles Act, allowing the monarch's title to vary in each realm but sharing a common format.) However, this unity of action was tested with the 1936 abdication of Edward VIII when the Irish Free State implemented the abdication a day later than the United Kingdom and the other dominions, creating a 24-hour divergence whereby Edward VIII was king in the Irish Free State and George VI was king elsewhere. The convention was reaffirmed with respect to succession in the 2011 Perth Agreement, whereby the Commonwealth realms co-operated to end male-preference primogeniture, with the changes coming into force in unison in March 2015.

The historian Vernon Bogdanor has stated that it remains constitutionally inappropriate for the succession to the Crown to diverge, even as the Commonwealth realms have attained complete independence from the United Kingdom. Legal scholar Noel Cox chronicled a transition from "unity of title, and unity of person" in 1931, to a division of responsibility among the realms by 1952, albeit with an expectation of uniformity concerning "matters of common concern, such as the succession to the throne". Cox views the relationship inversely to Bogdanor: the assent of each Commonwealth parliament would have effect within its own jurisdiction, and that absent mutual assent, the "Crown [is] potentially divisible in actuality as well as in law".

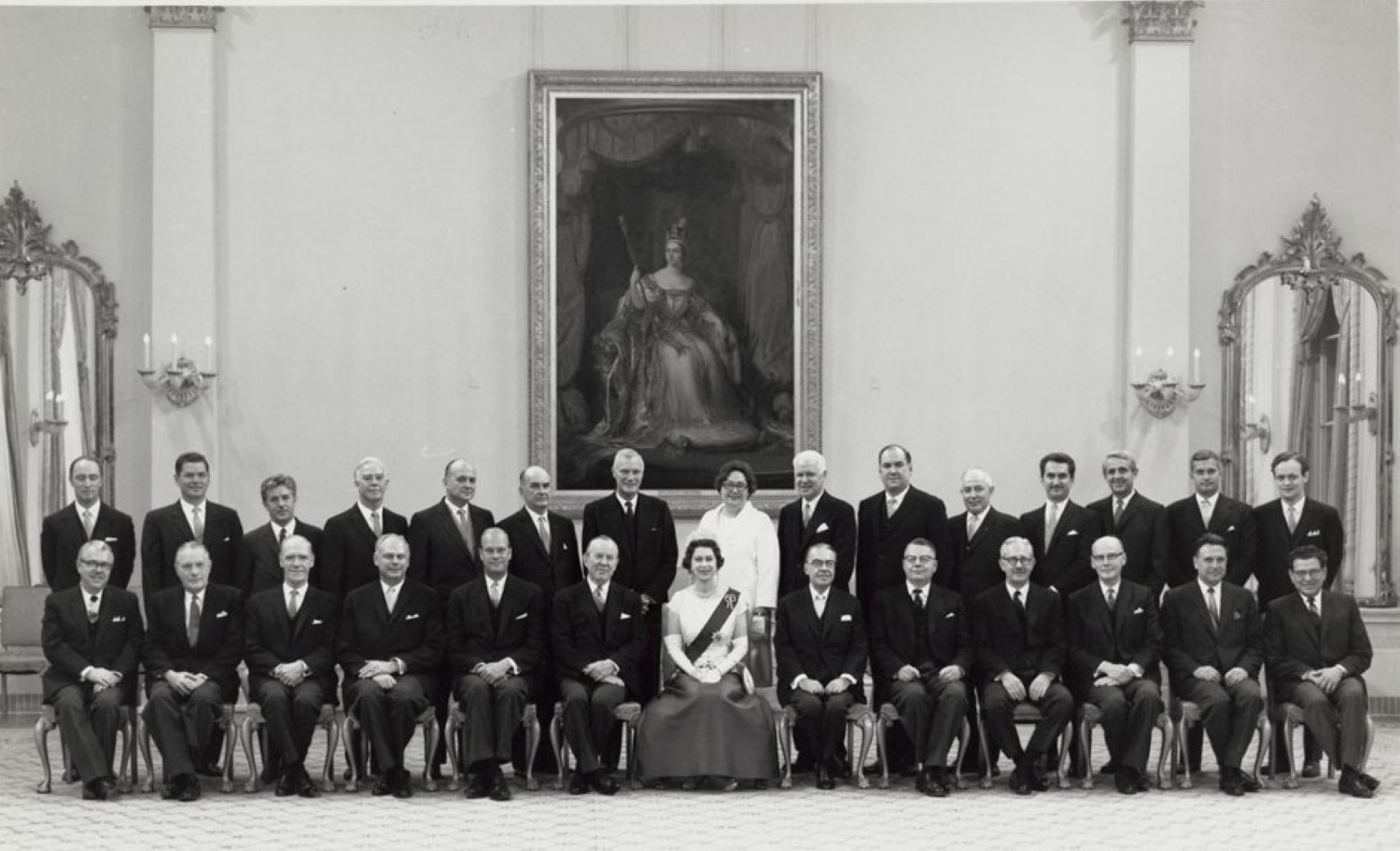
Elizabeth II, Queen of Canada, with her Cabinet in Rideau Hall, 1 July 1967

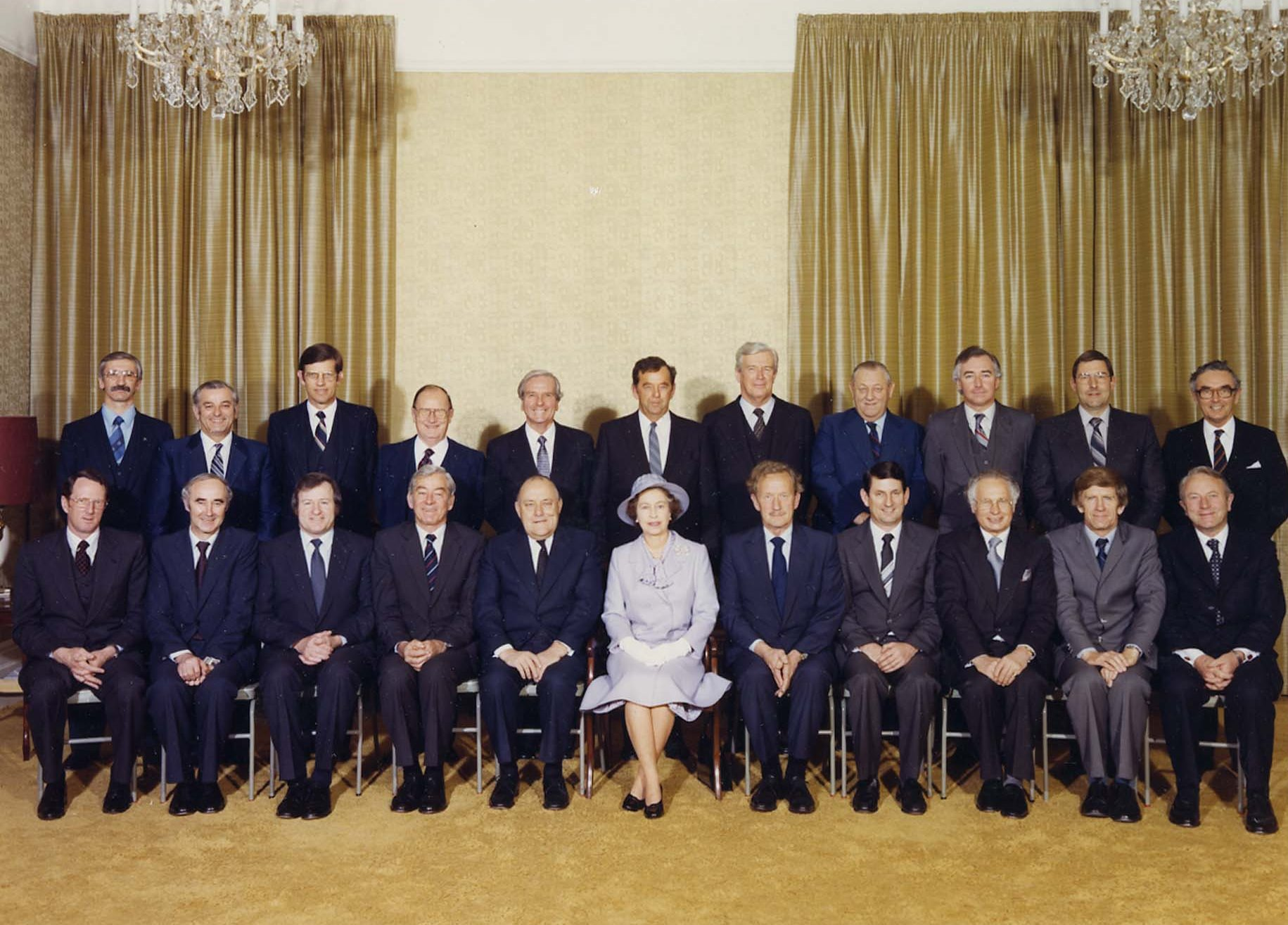
Elizabeth II, Queen of New Zealand, with her Cabinet, 1981

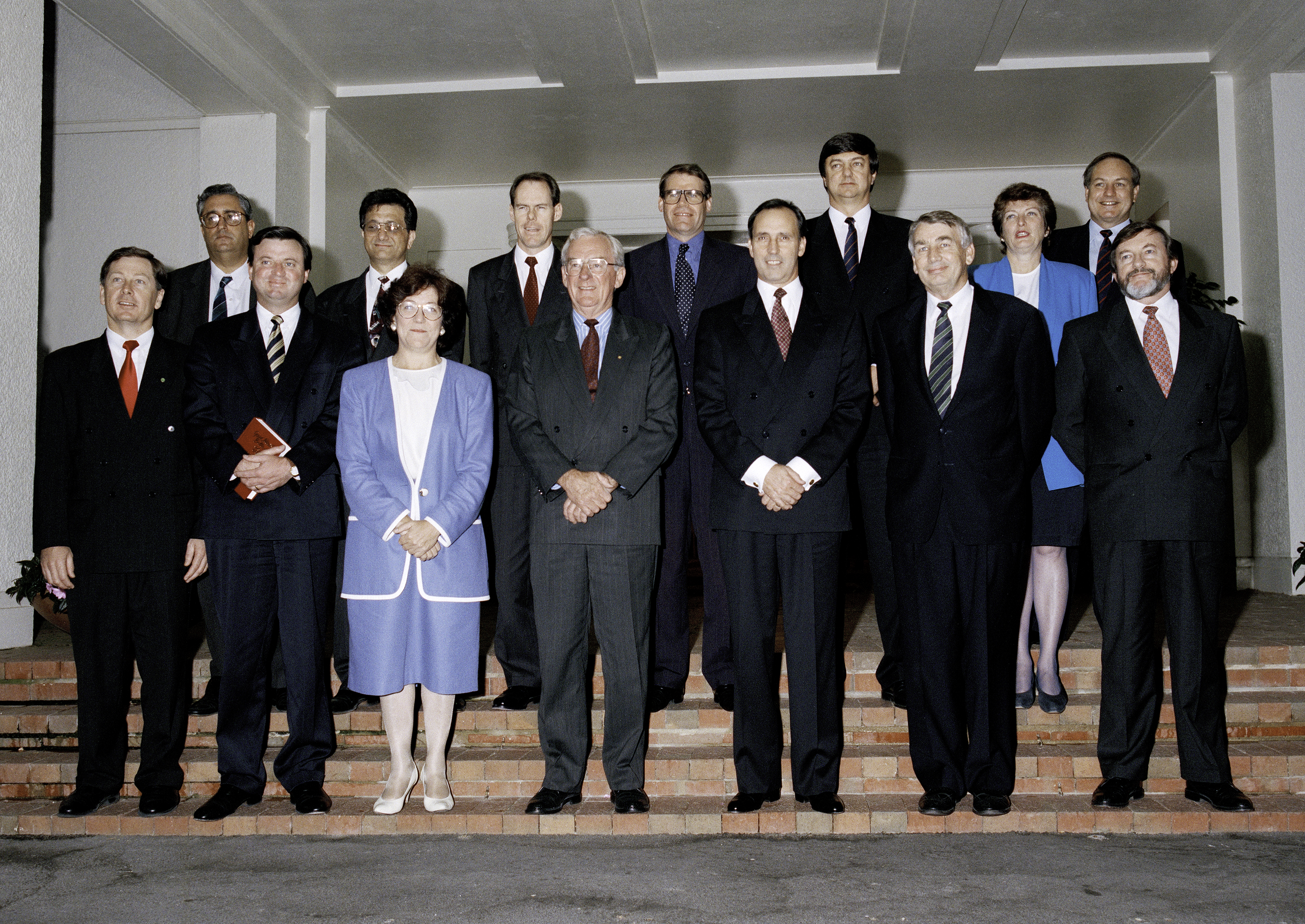
Governor-General Bill Hayden, representing Elizabeth II, Queen of Australia, with Cabinet outside Government House, 25 March 1994

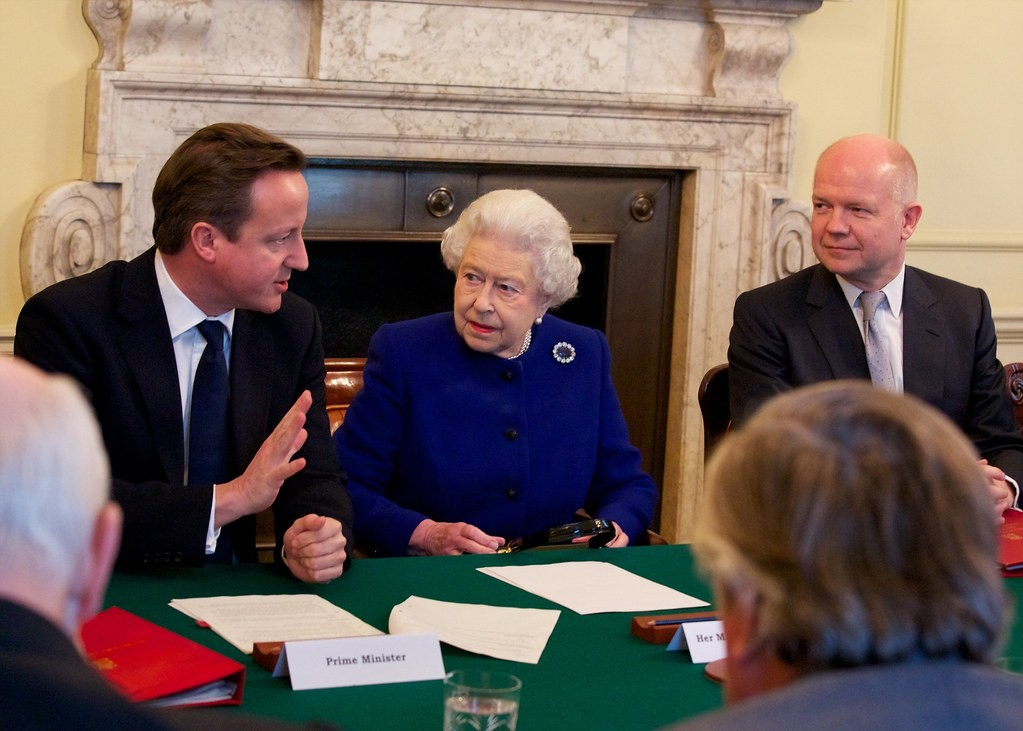
Elizabeth II, Queen of the United Kingdom, with her Cabinet at 10 Downing Street, 18 December 2012

The monarch, and their governors or governors-general, may only act in relation to each realm or territory on the advice of that realm or territory's respective ministers

=== Canada ===
The preamble to the British North America Act 1867 expressed the desire of the Canadian provinces to be united into one dominion "under the Crown of the United Kingdom of Great Britain and Ireland, with a Constitution similar in Principle to that of the United Kingdom". However, the judgement in Ex parte Indian Association of Alberta (EWCA, 1982) ruled that the obligations of the Crown towards the indigenous peoples in Canada were held by the Crown in right of Canada and not the Crown in right of the United Kingdom.

In Canada, one Crown acts separately in each of Canada's eleven governments (one federal and ten provincial). For example, when Crown land is transferred between the federal government and a province, it is the responsibility to manage the land that is being transferred; the Crown does not transfer ownership to itself. As Eugene Forsey wrote in Crown and Cabinet, "the provinces are not themselves 'monarchies.' They are a part of a constitutional monarchy, Canada. The Queen is Queen of Canada, not Queen of Ontario, Queen of Quebec, Queen of British Columbia, etc. She is, of course, queen in all these provinces. But she is 'Queen of Canada,' and it is as such that she is queen in each of the provinces."

=== Australia ===
It is a matter of debate whether separate Crowns exist for each Australian state. When referring to the Crown in multiple jurisdictions, wording is typically akin to "the Crown in right of [place], and all its other capacities".

=== New Zealand ===
In New Zealand, the term "the Crown" is used to mostly mean the authority of government; its meaning changes in different contexts. In the context of considering the claims and settlements related to the Treaty of Waitangi, historian Alan Ward defines the Crown as "the people of New Zealand—including Māori themselves—acted through elected parliament and government."

=== Crown Dependencies ===
The flag of Jersey, displaying the badge of Jersey surmounted by a Plantagenet crown

In the Bailiwick of Guernsey, legislation refers to "the Crown in Right of the Bailiwick of Guernsey" or "the Crown in Right of the Bailiwick" and the law officers of the Crown of Guernsey submitted that, "the Crown in this context ordinarily means the Crown in right of the république of the Bailiwick of Guernsey" and that this comprises "the collective governmental and civic institutions, established by and under the authority of the monarch, for the governance of these islands, including the states of Guernsey and legislatures in the other islands, the royal court and other courts, the lieutenant governor, parish authorities, and the Crown acting in and through the Privy Council".

In the Bailiwick of Jersey, statements by the law officers of the Crown define the Crown's operation in that jurisdiction as "the Crown in Right of Jersey", with all Crown land in the Bailiwick of Jersey belonging to the Crown in Right of Jersey and not to the Crown Estate of the United Kingdom. The Succession to the Crown (Jersey) Law 2013 defined the Crown, for the purposes of implementing the Perth Agreement in Jersey law, as the "Crown in Right of the Bailiwick of Jersey".

Legislation in the Isle of Man also defines the Crown in Right of the Isle of Man as being separate from the Crown in Right of the United Kingdom.

=== British Overseas Territories ===
Following the decision of the Lords of Appeal in Ordinary in Ex parte Quark, 2005, it is held that the King, in exercising his authority over British Overseas Territories, does not act on the advice of the Cabinet of the United Kingdom, but in his role as king of each territory, with the exception of fulfilling the UK's international responsibilities for its territories. To comply with the court's decision, the territorial governors now act on the advice of each territory's executive and the UK government can no longer disallow legislation passed by territorial legislatures. The Lords of Appeal wrote that "the Queen is as much the Queen of New South Wales and Mauritius and other territories acknowledging her as head of state as she is of England and Wales, Scotland, Northern Ireland, or the United Kingdom."

== Symbolism ==
The Crown is represented by the image of a crown in heraldry and other imagery such as cap badges, uniforms, government logos and elsewhere. The heraldic crown is chosen by the reigning monarch. From 1661 to the reign of Queen Victoria, an image of St Edward's Crown was used. The early part of Victoria's reign depicted the Imperial State Crown created for her coronation, while a Tudor Crown began to be used from the 1860s. In 1901, the Tudor Crown design was standardised and continued in use until the reign of Elizabeth II in 1952 when a heraldic St Edward's Crown was restored. In 2022, Charles III opted for a modified Tudor Crown design.

St Edward's Crown

1901 pattern Tudor Crown

2022 pattern Tudor Crown

Under section 4 of the Trade Marks Act 1994, images of the royal crowns may not be used in a trade mark in the UK (or in a country which is party to the Paris Convention) without permission. Section 99 of the act also restricts business use of images of the crowns in a way which is calculated to give the impression that the user is an employee of, or a supplier to, the King or a member of the royal family. The Lord Chamberlain's Office governs the use of depictions of the royal crowns and also maintains a selection of images which may be used without infringement.

== Crown forces ==
The term "Crown forces" has been used by Irish republicans and nationalists, including members of paramilitary groups, to refer to British security forces which have operated in Ireland. "Crown forces" was used by various iterations of the Irish Republican Army during conflicts such as Irish War of Independence (applied to the British Army, the Royal Irish Constabulary—regular, Black and Tans, and Auxiliary Division—and the Ulster Special Constabulary or USC) and the Troubles (applied to British Army units deployed from Great Britain, the local Ulster Defence Regiment, the Royal Ulster Constabulary and the USC). Due to the Irish War of Independence, "the phrase 'Crown Forces' came to represent something abhorrent in the Republican narrative". As noted by Irish republican Danny Morrison, "[t]he term 'security forces' suggests legitimacy, which is why republicans prefer terms like 'the Brits' or 'the Crown Forces', which undermines their authority."

== See also ==
- Crown Court – Criminal court of first instance of England and Wales
