= Fiat iustitia, et pereat mundus =

Latin phrase

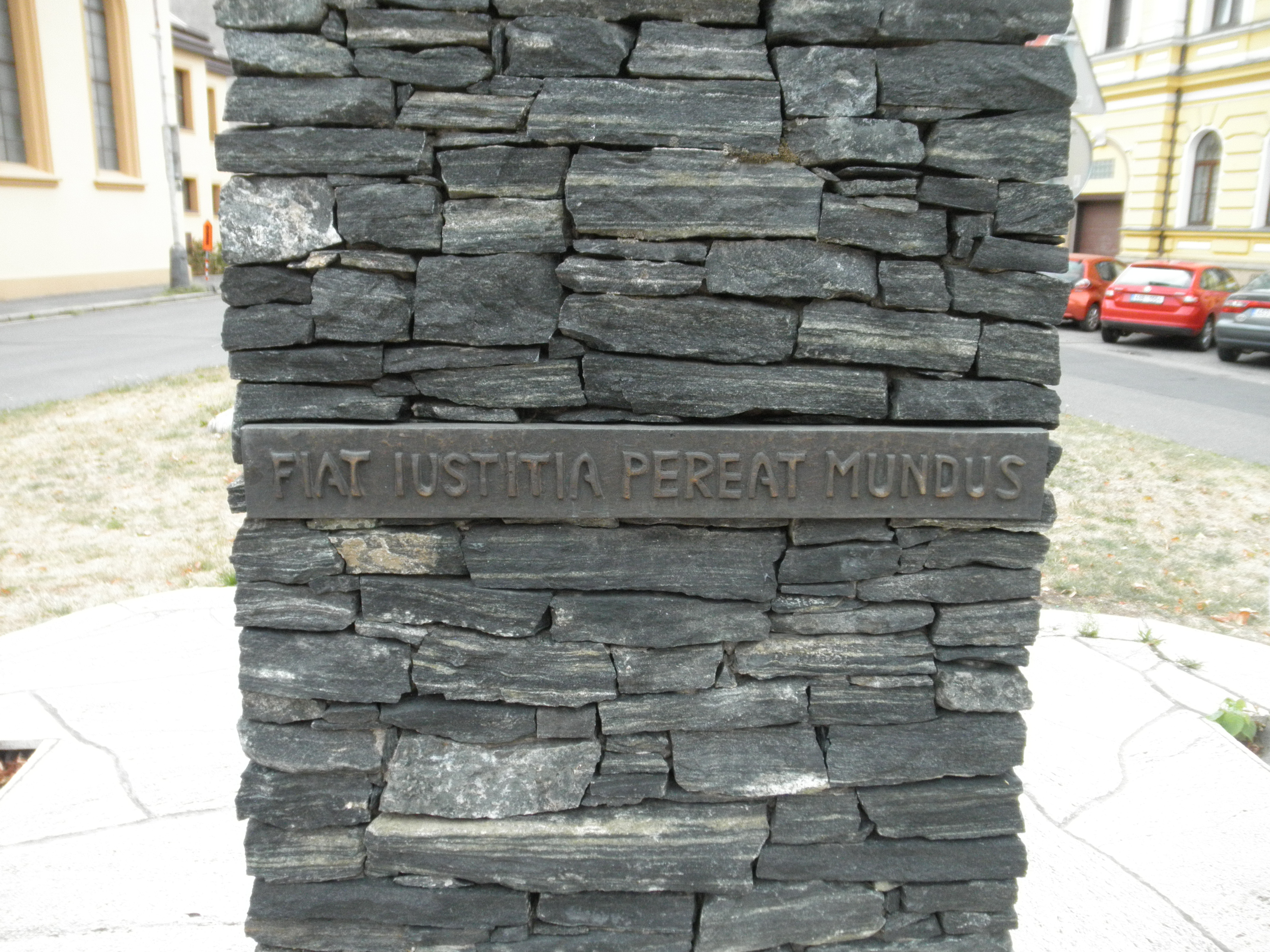
An inscription Fiat iustitia pereat mundus on the sculpture The Scales of Justice in Kolín. The sculpture was made by Ivan Erben in 2001.

Fiat iustitia, et pereat mundus is a Latin phrase, meaning "Let justice be done, though the world perish".

This sentence was the motto of Ferdinand I, Holy Roman Emperor (1556–1564), who used it as his slogan, and it became an important rule to control the nation. It probably originated from Johannes Jacobus Manlius's book Loci Communes (1563). It is a maxim meaning that a just decision should be made at whatever cost in terms of practical consequences. An alternative phrase is Fiat justitia ruat caelum, meaning "Let justice be done, though the heavens may fall."

A famous use is by Immanuel Kant, in his 1795 Perpetual Peace: A Philosophical Sketch (German: Zum ewigen Frieden. Ein philosophischer Entwurf), to summarize the counter-utilitarian nature of his moral philosophy, in the form Fiat justitia, pereat mundus, which he paraphrases as "Let justice reign even if all the rascals in the world should perish from it."

Ludwig von Mises wrote in Human Action, "The utilitarian economist does not say: Fiat justitia, pereat mundus. He says: Fiat justitia, ne pereat mundus." (Let Justice be done, so that the world won't perish, or, Let justice be done, lest the world perish).

== See also ==
- Fiat justitia ruat caelum, a similar phrase
