= Capias ad respondendum =

Legal writ

In the common law legal systems, capias ad respondendum (Latin: "that you may capture [him] in order for him to reply") is or was a writ issued by a court to the sheriff of a particular county to bring the defendant, having failed to appear, to answer a civil action against him.

== Specific jurisdictions ==
Under the American legal system, this writ was replaced by the practice of serving process directly to the person of the defendant in order to compel him to appear before the court to establish in personam jurisdiction over him. But now that the capias ad respondendum has given way to personal service of summons or other form of notice, due process requires only that in order to subject a defendant to a judgment in personam, if he be not present within the territory of the forum, he have certain minimum contacts with it such that the maintenance of the suit does not offend "traditional notions of fair play and substantial justice".

In the United Kingdom, this writ was abolished by the Crown Proceedings Act 1947, which came into effect on January 1, 1948.

In New South Wales (Australia), this writ is abolished by the Civil Procedure Act 2005 (NSW) along with any other process for attachment to the person ('in personam') or for committal of the person for trial in order to enforce a debt against a person.
