= Billy Meeske =

Australian wrestler

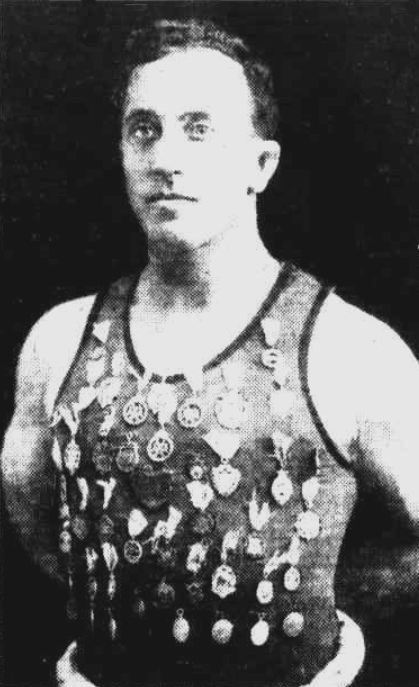

Personal information
- Born: 1891 South Melbourne, Victoria
- Died: 1970 (aged 78–79) Sydney

Professional wrestling career
- Trained by: Clarence Weber; Strangler Lewis
- Debut: 1915
- Retired: 1947

Billy Meeske (1891–1970) was an Australian professional wrestler who was three-time Australian heavyweight champion and one time Pacific Coast light heavyweight champion.

He was an active professional wrestler from 1915 to 1947. While he achieved his greatest fame in professional wrestling he was also an all-round sportsman competing in many sports at the amateur and professional levels, served in the Australian Imperial Force during the First World War with the rank of sergeant, and performed as part of vaudeville acts demonstrating feats of strength, such as supporting the weight of five men, feats of agility, and Russian dancing.

== Biography ==
=== Early life ===
Meeske was born in South Melbourne, Victoria, to Australian born parents and he would later claim to be 'purebred' Australian with the exception of one of his grandfather's grandfathers being Russian. He achieved renown as an all-round athlete in his youth, particularly for cycling, wrestling, weightlifting, swimming, gymnastics, and as a motorcyclist.

In 1903 he enrolled in the wrestling school of Weber and Rice. In 1907 he began cycling professionally, however in 1910 he decided he wished to compete in amateur events and was required to stand down from athletic competitions for one year in order to qualify for them. He began competing in amateur wrestling after his hiatus and became the Australian middleweight champion, holding the title from 1912 to 1914. He began his professional wrestling career in 1915 wrestling on an athletic program in April that year at a Melbourne event held to raise money for Belgium. He wrestled again in October on a Police Charity Carnival program.

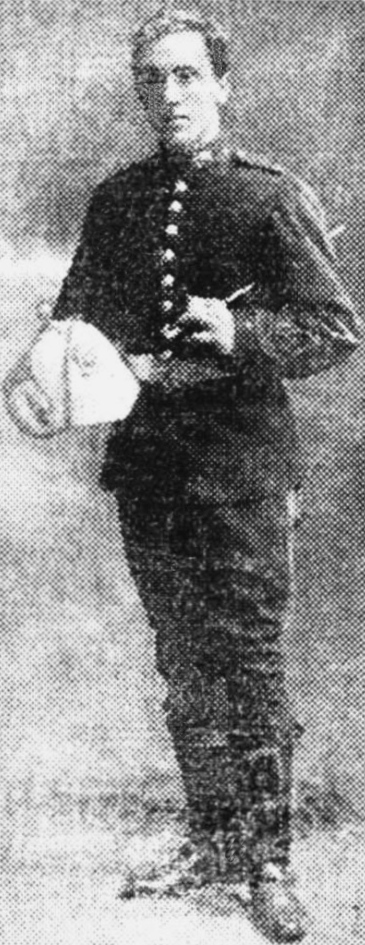
Sgt. Meeske in his military uniform.

=== Military service ===
In November 1915 he enlisted in the Australian Imperial Force due to the First World War. At the time of his enlistment he was married to May J. Meeske. During his training he was appointed physical instructor to the Royal Park Camp and began training for boxing. He showed an aptitude for boxing and in July 1916 he sparred with twenty men in one evening at the Royal Park Camp. He was valued for his ability as a physical trainer and as such his superiors were reluctant to deploy him however he wished to serve at the front and was finally deployed with the Railway Unit in early 1917. He wrestled a Russian soldier during the voyage to the front, and while boxing competitions took place during the voyage Meeske was banned from participating due to his skill.

As of November 1917 he was serving as a sapper in Belgium, and boxed against fellow soldiers while on active service there. As of 1918 he was in France and serving on the physical training staff of a convalescent camp, and wrestled in a competition between Australian, American, Canadian, English, and Belgian soldiers in 1918, and judged a boxing competition in 1919. During his time deployed in France he had eighteen boxing matches winning seventeen and drawing one and defeated former French wrestling champion M. Pernin in a wrestling match.

=== First reign as heavyweight champion of Australia ===
Meeske was back in Australia in 1920 and became an instructor at the Victorian Railways Institute and at some point became physical instructor for the Essendon Football Club. In February he directed an athletic program during which he demonstrated Russian dance, jiu-jitsu, and weightlifting. In April he issued a challenge wagering twenty pounds that no light heavyweight wrestler in Australia could beat him in a catch-as-catch-can style best of three falls match. As of September 1920 it was being suggested that he may have a superior physique to respected wrestler Clarence Weber, and he challenged Weber to put the heavy-weight championship on the line, but later learnt that Weber had officially retired in 1913 and as such claimed to be the Australian heavyweight champion and stated that he was willing to defend the title against any challenger including Weber. Weber declined to wrestle Meeske unless he was paid one hundred pounds, and in 1921 it was suggested that there were no worthy opponents for Meeske in Australia. In August 1921 he wrestled his first match after the war defeating Billy Tonkin.

In January 1922 Meeske had a jiu-jitsu match against Billy McGarvey. Professional wrestling was described as having almost lapsed out of existence in Australia as of 1922, and in late January the company Country Stadiums Ltd. moved to reinvigorate the sport organizing for Meeske to wrestle Billy Kopsch under their auspices in March. Victorian wrestler, Bert Potts, challenged Meeske for the Australian championship before Meeske had wrestled Kopsch. As the scheduled date approached Meeske delayed the match by a fortnight, but by April it had still not taken place, with Kopsch stating he had not heard any news regarding it. As of July 1922 Meeske was still claiming the heavyweight championship and giving wrestling demonstrations with Billy Tonkin, and in July he issued a challenge claiming he was able to throw any twelve wrestlers in Australia within an hour.

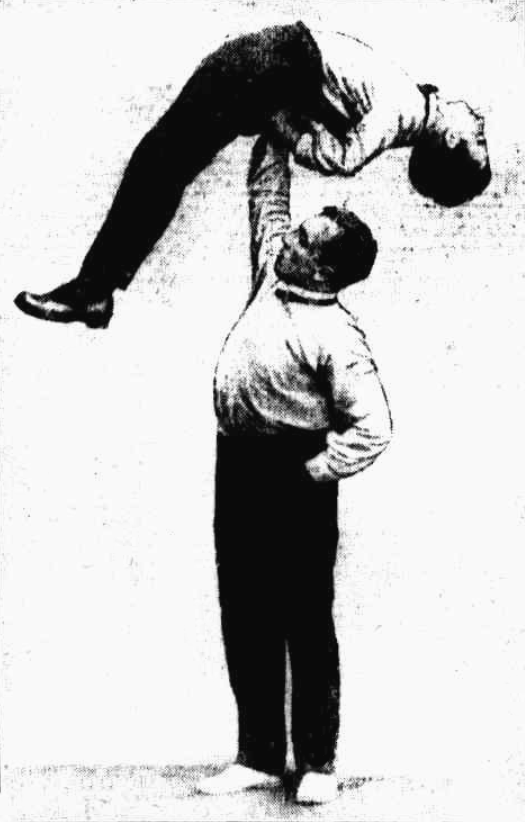
Billy Meeske demonstrating a feat of strength, 1923

In August 1922 a meeting of all professional wrestlers in Victoria was held by the newspaper Sporting Globe to organize and reinvigorate the sport and resolve the issue of scheduled matches falling through. At the meeting it was decided that the two wrestlers with the best claim to the heavyweight championship of Australia were Joe Bailey and Meeske and a match was scheduled. In September 1922 to promote the match Meeske antagonized Bailey by having ten pounds delivered to him via the newspaper the Sporting Globe as a wager and suggesting that Bailey may not show due to cowardice. He later sent an additional fifteen pounds to Bailey saying he would wrestle him at any time and any location with ten days notice. Meeske finally wrestled for the heavyweight championship against Bailey on November 22 at Melbourne Stadium, defeating him and becoming the recognized heavyweight champion of Australia. After his victory he went on holiday to Gippsland Lakes.

In January 1923 Meeske agreed to face Dave Smith for the heavyweight title in February, and announced that he would defend the title against Billy Kopsch if he defeated Smith ahead of the match. He defeated Smith with the victory being described as easy, and decisive with the match lasting just three minutes. Meeske's manager demanded that Kopsch wager twenty-five pounds ahead of their match, accusing him of not drawing large enough crowds to his matches, and Meeske instead wrestled and defeated Scotsman Jim McMurdo in April 1923. Another notable event in April was that Meeske joined the coaching staff of the South Melbourne Football Club.

In May, 1923, Kopsch challenged Meeske again, and they finally wrestled on May 31 with Meeske winning after Kopsche sustained a shoulder injury he claimed seriously handicapped him. They wrestled a second time in June with Meeske winning again. After this a match between Meeske and Clarence Weber, who had recently come out of retirement, was hotly anticipated but Meeske postponed scheduling a bout due to his commitments with the South Melbourne Football Club, although he did wrestle and beat Charles Honroth in late June. In July the date of a Meeske and Weber wrestling match was set, and the prospect received interest throughout the month. In early August Meeske won a jiu-jitsu match against Billy Kopsch which was billed as a 'fight to the death' due to strangle holds being allowed. They fought a second jiu-jitsu match with the stipulation that they wear jackets in late August which Meeske also won.

In late August Weber and Meeske participated in vaudeville acts to promote their match, demonstrating feats of strength, and they finally wrestled on 1 September 1923 before a crowd reported to be from 8,000 to 9,000 strong with Weber dominating the match and winning the championship. Meeske claimed to have been hampered by injuring his knee during training, and limped from the ring, but declined to release a medical certificate due to 'medical etiquette'. Shortly after the match he offered to wager one hundred pounds that he could defeat Weber in a fair fight.

=== Cruiserweight champion ===
After losing the championship Meeske performed at a local concerts across Victoria, performing demonstrations of feats of strength and agility and Russian dancing. He also gave wrestling exhibitions in Melbourne alongside Weber, and their joint promotional work was credited with greatly increasing the popularity of professional wrestling in Melbourne.

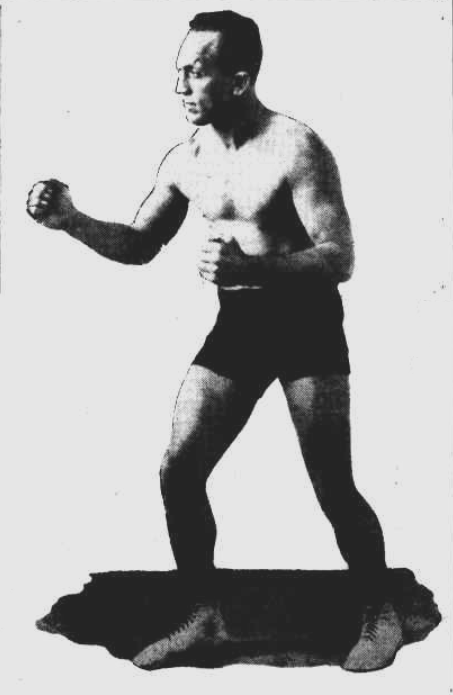
Billy Meeske, 1924

In November 1923 Meeske announced his knee had recovered and he was ready to wrestle again, and a match against Jim McMurdo was scheduled for the cruiserweight championship with Meeske describing it as a chance to have "another chance at Weber". Meeske spoke positively about McMurdo's skill prior to the match, which took place in December and was described as an even contest which Meeske won with some cheating. A notable spot in the match was Meeske being thrown out of the ring and landing on a reporter.

In January 1924 Meeske and McMurdo were scheduled to wrestle again but McMurdo was injured causing the match to be canceled. In February Meeske wrestled Charles Honroth instead in a match which Meeske won, but was criticized for being slow paced. Meeske then accused Weber of avoiding a match against him, and reiterated that he felt he had only lost due to his leg injury. In March 1924 Meeske was scheduled to fight Peter Fatouros, a Greek wrestler, in his debut in a challenge match in which he had to throw Fatouros out of the ring twice. He claimed to have cut open his hand on a kerosene tin full of soap ahead of the match, which was postponed as Meeske was booked to wrestle the visiting American wrestler Walter Miller after Weber pulled out of a match against him. The bout was promoted as being a test of the standard of Australian wrestling relative to America, and a test of whether Meeske deserved to challenge for the world championship. Miller defeated Meeske, badly injuring his shoulder in the finish resulting in tension between both wrestlers camps, Meeske demonstrating discontent with his own team for throwing in the towel after his injury, and Miller being heckled as he left the ring.

In late May 1924 Meeske expressed that he wanted a no-rules rematch with Walter Miller before he returned to America and then a title match against Weber. The Miller-Meeske rematch took place in June and was evenly matched going the distance with Miller winning on points to the crowds dismay, although there was a lack of heat for the match and attendance was poor. Meeske almost immediately issued a challenge for a second rematch wagering two hundred pounds that he could beat Miller, and it was suggested that a rematch may decide the heavyweight championship, as Miller had beaten reigning champion Clarence Weber, however it was determined that as Miller had not lived in Australia for six months before beating Weber he could not qualify as champion and the match did not go ahead. Miller invited Meeske to come to America with him when he departed Australia.

In October 1924 Meeske visited Brisbane, Queensland, to assist a team of amateur boxers and wrestlers and during his time there he trained for a match against Peter Limutkin. The Limutkin match was scheduled to take place in Sydney, New South Wales, and was the first major professional wrestling event in the city since before the war began, and the first time Meeske had wrestled in Sydney. It was organized as a result of the success of professional wrestling events involving Walter Miller in Melbourne. To promote the match both wrestlers gave training displays at the stadium where it was going to take place in late October. The match took place in late October and was attended by an estimated 2,000 or 3,000 people, which Meeske regarded as less than he expected, although he felt there was potential for professional wrestling to gain popularity. It went the full rounds with Meeske winning by decision although a doctor determining Limutkin had fractured a rib during it. Meeske went on holiday to the Blue Mountains after the match before returning to Melbourne in November and beginning to train to face Weber.

American light-heavy champion wrestler Ted Thye visited Australia in late 1924 and Meeske was scheduled to wrestle him in Sydney in December although he needed to secure leave of absence from his position with Victorian Railways to make the trip. Thye won the match using a toehold and forcing Meeske to tapout. The match impressed a manager to the extent that they immediately arranged a rematch, suggesting that as Meeske was Australian cruiserweight champion and Thye was American cruiserweight champion it could be billed as a world championship match, although a report did note that there was not a full house in attendance. When he returned to Melbourne after the match Meeske told reporters there was no ill will between him and Thye, noting that they had soaped each other's backs in the showers after the bout. In late December Thye and Meeske wrestled in Sydney a second time and went for the full eight rounds with the match being called a draw on points. The second match was also poorly attended resulting in the future of professional wrestling in Sydney being questioned.

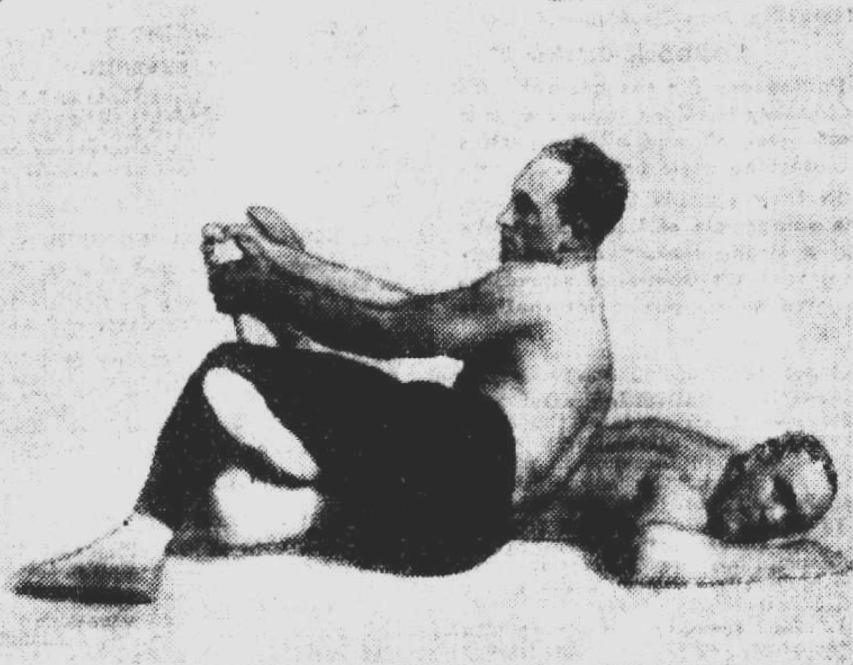
Meeske demonstrating a toehold, 1924

In January 1925 Meeske lost to Al Karasik in Melbourne in a wrestling match which devolved into a brawl with a dozen men reportedly being required to separate them to end the match. In late January Weber announced he was ready to wrestle Meeske in a championship bout, however Meeske responded that he was already making preparations to participate in a cruiserweight world championship and have a rematch with Karasick to prepare and would have to wait until after the championship to wrestle Weber, and noted that he had challenged Weber several times in the past year with no response. Weber retorted that Meeske had also kept him waiting for several months before their first championship match. In February Meeske challenged Karasick to a rematch, stating he had developed a counter to his headholds.

In March Walter Miller returned to Australia and Meeske was scheduled to be his first opponent, however Stadiums Ltd. instead booked Karasick to face Miller, resulting in Meeske expressing that he had been treated unfairly by the company, and as such he expressed his intention to move to America after wrestling Bill Dutton, who had challenged him in January, and issuing a challenge to Peter Limutkin or Samuel Burmister. A media report on Meeske's comments noted that he had been overlooked by promoters in recent years who were favoring visiting wrestlers from overseas, causing the careers of Australian wrestlers like Meeske to be neglected and the professional wrestling scene overall to slump when the visitor left the country. On March 29 Meeske beat Dutton in Wollongong, and in April he secured a match against Sam Burmister who threatened to crush Meeske's shoulders into the canvas ahead of the bout, however Meeske won the match which was described as a poor exhibition.

Meeske did not follow through on his threat to leave the country after wrestling Burmister as Walter Miller had issued a general challenge to all Australian wrestlers which he intended to accept, and in preparation he renewed his challenge to Karasick. In May 1925 he secured publicity by challenging Karasick in person at a match between Thye and Karasick which was accepted, however he was ultimately booked to face Miller instead in late May and outscored Miller on points, but lost due to being pinned. In August 1925 he won a match against Indian wrestler Mahomet Ali Sunni, and lost against American wrestler James O'Connell, who was billed as the welter and middle-weight world champion. As of September Meeske was again planning to go to America, but late in the month he wrestled Sam Burmister again, this time in Adelaide in the first professional wrestling event in the city for many years which Meeske won, although it was noticed that Burmister only made aggressive maneuvers twice in the match, allowing Meeske to attack for the majority of the time. He was scheduled to wrestle Karasick again in October, but Karasick reported he was unfit on the scheduled date.

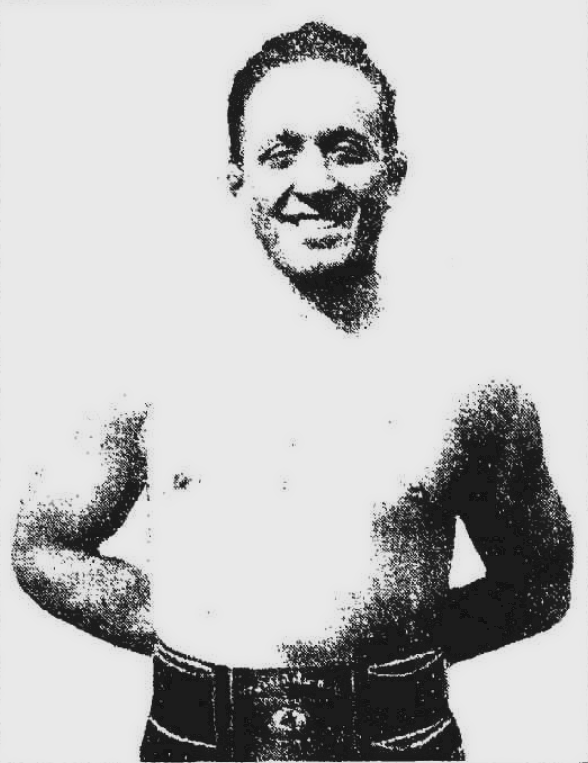
Billy Meeske with the Pacific Coast Championship belt, 1926.

=== Wrestling abroad ===
In October 1925 Meeske departed Australia for America with his wife on the ship Aorangi, and he was fare-welled by colleagues of the Railways Institute at an evening in his honor and given a travel rug by the South Melbourne Football Club upon his departure. En route to America Meeske visited New Zealand and won two wrestling matches, against a Brown and Simpson, in Auckland. Meeske first arrived in Vancouver, staying for two days, before travelling on to Chicago through Seattle and Portland. As of November 1925 he had settled in Sioux City, Iowa, and won three wrestling matches there, and despite his absence from the country he was still being reported as the Australian cruiserweight champion. In December he beat Vladimir Kuzmak.

By January 1926 Meeske had moved to Chicago where he signed with the promoter Ed White for six matches and began training with Strangler Lewis, and he defeated Mike Yokel for the Pacific Coast Light Heavyweight Championship (billed as the world light heavy-weight belt) that month. By February he had defeated Ralph Hands, billed as champion of San Francisco, and August Burch, billed as champion of Salt Lake City. In early February he beat Ralph Hands in a rematch and also beat Al Karasick who was also in America. On 18 February 1926 he had his first loss in America to Billy Edwards in a match in Portland, dropping the Pacific Coast Light Heavyweight Championship, due to kicking Edwards in the chin during the bout which he claimed was an accident. His wrestling schedule was becoming busier and in late February he defeated Ralph Hands a third time and Frank Pilling in the same week he lost to Edwards. He lost a rematch to Edwards before the close of February, and in early March he lost to Karasick.

In total Meeske wrestled twenty-eight matches and won twenty-six of them while in America. He noted that American wrestling audiences were very hostile to him as a foreigner, and after one match he assaulted a fan who was abusing him as he left the ring and was pursued by police, but after explaining the situation he was not arrested, although on another occasion he claimed a local chief of police threatened to run him out of town. In one match a fan invaded the ring to interfere and drew a gun when Meeske hit him, but was swiftly rushed by several people and disarmed.

Sydney Stadiums Ltd. organized for several wrestlers, including Meeske, to come to Australia from America to wrestle in March 1926. His successful run in America was noted as an indication he would be an even competitor with the rest of the touring wrestlers. He visited New Zealand before arriving back in Australia, and wrestled H. Anderson, the New Zealand light-heavyweight champion, three times winning twice and losing once.

=== Pursuit of the Heavyweight Championship ===
He arrived back in Melbourne on 22 April 1926 and resumed employment with Victorian Railways and as a trainer with the South Melbourne Football Club. In May he made a public appearance at Melbourne Stadium and received a large ovation. He wrestled his first match after returning against the American Mike Yokel on May 16 in what was described as one of the cruelest and roughest wrestling matches ever seen in Melbourne, with moves becoming gradually more extreme until Yokel appeared to render Meeske unconscious and began celebrating before being disqualified. The American 'rough-house' style was not well received by audiences and Meeske adopted more conventional wrestling in a match against Martin Ludecke the following week, which he lost. In June a boxing committee attempted to have Meeske come to Broken Hill to wrestle, but he responded that he was under contract with Stadium Ltd. for a few more matches.

By the end of June a title match between Meeske and the reigning heavyweight champion Clarence Weber had been scheduled for July 10, and there was an immediate heavy demand for bookings. Emphasis was placed on the fact Meeske had improved from their last bout by enhancing his technique in America in the leadup to the match, although general sentiment was reportedly that Weber would retain the title. The two wrestlers attracted a large crowd just for a demonstration session in which they demonstrated wrestling holds ahead of the match. They wrestled on July 11 and it was an even match until Meeske was disqualified for knocking Weber out with a punch to the jaw after which Weber's camp invaded the ring and Meeske was heckled as he fled to his dressing room protected by several police constables, with Weber receiving loud cheers when he came to. After the match Meeske claimed the blow was accidental and said he would wrestle Weber again any time. The crowd reaction to the Weber-Meeske match was described as unprecedented and prompted the manager of the stadium where the match took place to launch an inquiry, during which fellow wrestlers Mike Yokel and Martin Ludecke explained that such blows easily occur in wrestling by accident, with Yokel showing injuries to prove it. Weber also stated that Meeske had apologized to him and asked for leniency. It was concluded that Meeske could retain his share of the gate money, with the manager of Stadiums Ltd. publicly warning Meeske to avoid roughness in future.

In early August Meeske made an appearance at ringside at a match between Sam Clapham, a British wrestler billed as the British Empire champion, and Ted Thye in Melbourne. In late August Meeske denied that Clapham was the best wrestler in the British Empire and challenged him to a match to prove it, however ultimately no match took place. He was training wrestlers as of 1926 and in late August he gave an exhibition with his students at a carnival in Northcote. By September the Weber rematch had been scheduled, which took place on September 18. Despite crowd expectations of rough behavior Meeske beat Weber cleanly with conventional wrestling to become heavyweight champion of Australia for the second time in his career. The match was noted as lacking the animosity that had come to characterize recent high-profile wrestling matches, being completely clean.

=== Second reign as heavyweight champion ===
Meeske retained the cruiserweight championship of Australia after becoming heavyweight champion, and as such calls for him to wrestle Sam Clapham, who by this time was being billed as the world cruiserweight championship, continued throughout October 1926, however Clapham's schedule was already full up until he was to depart the country making it impossible to schedule a bout.

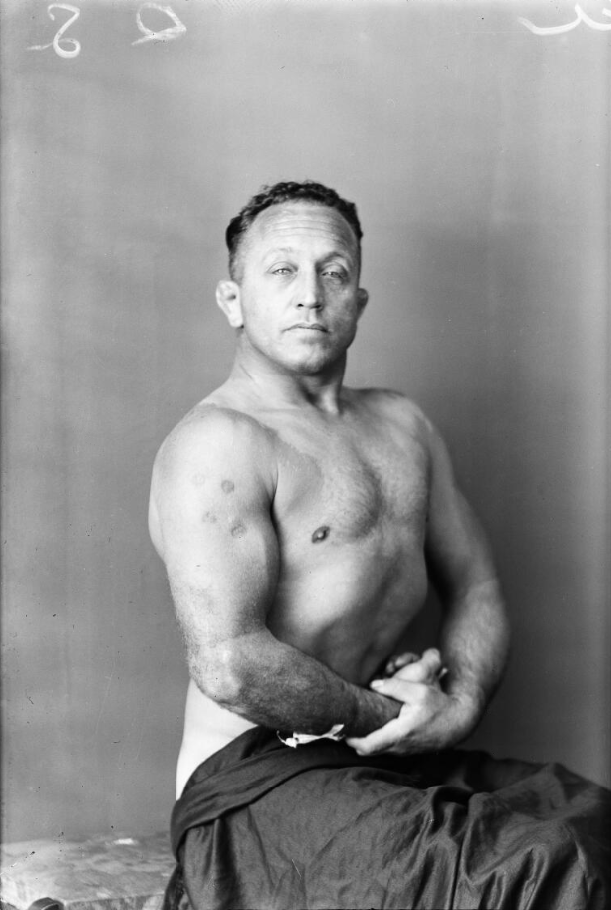
Billy Meeske, 1927.

In early October 1926 Meeske wrestled Mike Yokel and lost after retiring due to being thrown out of the ring onto the steps and then the stone floor, which did not cause a change in the heavyweight title as Yokel did not qualify as an Australian. Weber challenged Meeske for another shot at the heavyweight title late in November and it was suggested a rematch could take place before the end of the year, however Meeske wrestled Yokel a second time instead to close the year's wrestling season in an 'all-in' match in which ju-jitsu holds were allowed.

Meeske wrestled Con Keatos in a demonstration to promote the Yokel match, which took place in early November 1926 and was won by Yokel, with one spot featuring Yokel pointing to Meeske's trunks to imply they were falling and tackling him when he looked. During the match the referees shirt was ripped off when he tried to separate the fighters and Meeske tackled the referee once and threw Yokel out of the ring several times reflecting the 'all-in' nature of the match. The match was well-attended and a rematch was swiftly organized for the following week, shortly before Yokel was to return to America, and tickets to the rematch sold well. Yokel beat Meeske again in the match which was well received by the crowd, but some felt it incorporated too much ju-jitsu at the expense of wrestling holds which was a criticism leveled at the direction professional wrestling had taken in general over the year. In December Peter Limutkin challenged Meeske to a match.

In April 1927 Meeske opened his year by wrestling Canadian champion Billy Edwards, billed as the roughest wrestler in the world, and lost by appearing to be rendered unconscious by a headlock and carried from the ring. The match was 'all-in' featuring biting, gouging, and assault of the referee from Edwards, however Meeske wrestled cleanly. In late May Meeske wrestled Ted Thye and lost due to being pinned, and while the match impressed some critics its clean nature and lack of brutality bored spectators.

In June 1927 Clarence Weber accused Meeske of ignoring his challenge despite agreeing to defend the title against him in January, and announced that if Meeske did not respond in fourteen days he would claim the heavyweight title for himself by default, which prompted Meeske to agree to schedule a bout. They wrestled in August and the match went the full rounds and was drawn on points with Meeske retaining the title, however the match was of very low quality with the lack of athleticism, particularly due to Weber's age, making spectators suspect that the contest was staged and it was suggested that the match may lead to a collapse in professional wrestling in Melbourne. In September Meeske made acrobatic vaudeville appearances and it was suggested that he could make a career outside of wrestling as an entertainer.

In October 1927 Meeske wrestled John Kilonis in Melbourne and won after Kilonis was disqualified for kicking him in the face and throwing him out of the ring. After the disqualification Meeske and Kilonis fought an impromptu boxing match which resulted in Kilonis being knocked out of the ring onto the press seats, however it was observed that he was sent out of the ring by a light tap and the match was described as "a huge joke", although it was also reported it received a positive reaction from the audience. Before the end of the month they fought a mixed boxing/wrestling rematch with Kilonis winning the wrestling match and Meeske winning the boxing bout but punching Kilonis after receiving the decision resulting in a short scuffle. In November he wrestled and beat Al Karasick in what was described as a moderate display. While the Karasick bout was the last match of the 1927 season Meeske wrestled again in Burnie, Tasmania, in December successfully defending the heavyweight title against Sam Burmister, and also wrestled a match in Latrobe before returning to Victoria in early January, 1928.

In January 1928 Meeske served as a referee for wrestling matches at the South Melbourne Carnival, and toured performing a vaudeville act and feats of strength into February and March. He returned to the ring in May wrestling in New South Wales where he beat Hugo Jorgenson, and John Savelieff, then beat Sam Burmister in Launceston, Tasmania, Late in May he returned to Melbourne where he lost in a non-title match to American wrestler Bobby "Bullet" Meyers, before defending the heavyweight title against Hugo Jorgenson. He lost to Bob Kruse, another American wrestler, in a non-title match in early June, with the match being described as disappointing and unexciting. In August he defeated Clete Kauffman in South Australia, and in September he wrestled in a draw against Louis Percantas in Queensland. While in Queensland he also lost in a non-title match to American wrestler Hugh Nicholls, during which he almost attacked the referee, with the match being criticized as a circus act with a media report noting the display appeared scripted.

In November 1928 Meeske relocated to Perth and defeated George Boganski with media reports noting the match was likely to increase interest in professional wrestling in Western Australia, and in early December he wrestled in Perth again against Louis Pergantes with Meeske winning despite interference from Sam Burmister to promote their upcoming Perth match. He defeated Burmister a week later in a match at the Subiaco Oval which reportedly had the largest attendance of any professional wrestling event in Western Australia up to that point, however the match was also described as one of the most disappointing matches held in Australia. In late December he wrestled in Perth again against English wrestler Henry Irslinger in a match billed as being for the light-heavyweight championship of the British Empire which he lost by being thrown from the ring. The Irslinger bout received positive media coverage, and Meeske remained in Perth into 1929 losing in a match to Pergantas early in January.

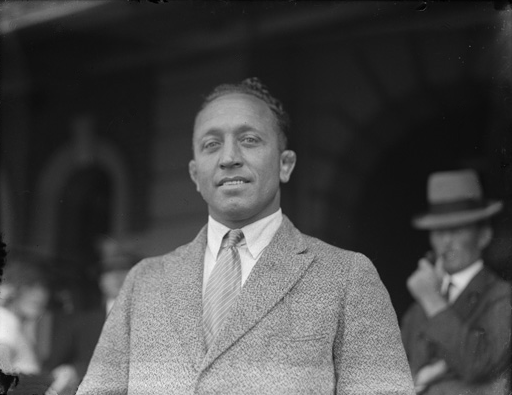
Billy Meeske, 1929.

In mid January 1929 Meeske announced he intended to embark on a tour of Canada, the United States, and England to wrestle, although ultimately he remained in Australia and late in the month he wrestled in Mildura, Victoria, defeating Hugo Jorgenson to retain the heavyweight title. In March he moved to Perth from Melbourne again and began performing wrestling exhibitions and promoting professional wrestling in the city. At the end of March he wrestled and beat Henry Irslinger at the Subiaco Oval with thousands attending the match, and in April he lost in a non-title match to Louis Pergantes.

Meeske returned to Melbourne in May 1929 and opened a gym where he began coaching boxing, wrestling, and general fitness, and the business quickly became successful. He returned to the ring in late June being defeated in a non-title match by American Clarence Ecklund, billed as world champion, in what was his first match in Melbourne for some time. Attendance at the match was poor sparking speculation professional wrestling was no longer viable in Victoria, and his next match was in September when he lost to British wrestler Scotty McDougall in Newcastle, New South Wales. During the match McDougall began bleeding profusely from the brow drawing some media criticism of the bout being excessively violent. The match was well-attended despite criticism, prompting a rematch the following week which was a draw characterized by over the top spots which lead to it being described as a farce in the media albeit drawing positive crowd reactions. They wrestled a third time in Newcastle in October in an "all-in" match described as rough with McDougall winning by decision. In December Meeske wrestled in Newcastle again against George Walker and lost by disqualification, however the bout received only a moderate attendance and was regarded as unexciting.

In 1930 a report noted that Meeske had found it difficult to earn money through wrestling in recent years as foreign wrestlers had dominated bookings in the Australian industry, and he did not wrestle again until February 1930 when he lost to Italian Leone Labriola in Sydney in a bout which reportedly restored Stadiums Ltd. confidence in him as a wrestler. He wrestled in Sydney again before the end of the month losing to Russian Tom Lurich. In March he expanded his Melbourne gym due to having more customers than its facilities could handle and began providing physical training to women. In late March he returned to Sydney where he defeated Jack Higgins in a match, then wrestled a draw against Tom Lurich in April, and a win against John Savelieff and loss against Lurich in May. In June he returned to Newcastle where he wrestled in a loss to George Penchell. In late July 1930 Meeske issued a public request to be booked for matches, prompting comments that he was still being underutilised by Stadiums Ltd. In September he went to Adelaide where he successfully defended the heavyweight title against Australian Jack "Tiger" Higgins, and they fought a rematch in October which was a draw with Meeske retaining the title. In November he wrestled in New South Wales again defeating John Savelieff.

In February 1931 Meeske wrestled in Victoria again defeating Jim McMurdo in Warrnambool, with McMurdo breaking ribs due to being thrown into an orchestra pit during the match. In March he defended the heavyweight title defeating Karl Stenning in Newtown, New South Wales, then organized a match against South African "Tiger" McMurdo which was billed as being for the British Empire Championship. In the leadup to the match Meeske claimed to have secured the title while in England during the First World War, and when he defeated McMurdo in Sydney in late March he was billed as having retained the British Empire title. After the McMurdo match Meeske toured his vaudeville act in Victoria into April. In May 1931 the New Zealand Wrestling Union decided to bar him from competing in the country citing a preference for booking American wrestlers, as he had expressed interest in wrestling in New Zealand.

Meeske relocated to Rockhampton, Queensland, in May 1931 and early in the month he wrestled and beat Canadian Jack Savaloff in what was regarded as an extremely exciting match with good attendance. In late May he wrestled and defeated American Louis Marsella receiving strong support from the Rockhampton audience, and in early June he defeated South African Carl Stenning with Stenning winning the crowd over during their match. Later in June he and Marschello faced each other again in Longreach with Meeske again winning. The first professional wrestling championship match to be held in Queensland was scheduled in Rockhampton between Savaloff and Meeske for the Australian cruiserweight belt in June 1931. Savaloff defeated Meeske winning the cruiserweight title, and he reportedly attempted to immediately leave the country with Meeske confronting him at the Rockhampton train station and convincing him to book a rematch. In late June Meeske defeated Martin Butch in a violent match, and a few days later defeated Savaloff to regain the cruiserweight title, shortly before returning to Melbourne. In August 1931 Meeske wrestled in Melbourne defeating Peter Fatouros to defend the heavyweight championship. Fatouros was known for running a fish and chips shop and the announcement of the match resulted in laughter, with the match itself being viewed as a comedy bout.

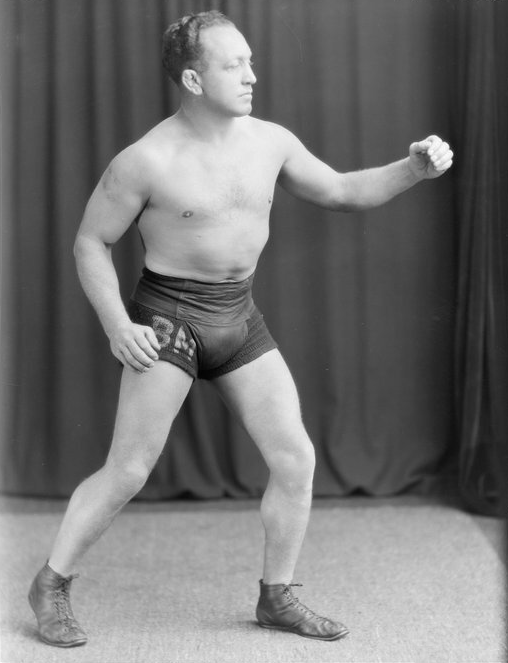
Billy Meeske, 1931.

By October 1931 Meeske had secured permission to wrestle in New Zealand, despite having earlier being barred, and he relocated to Wellington that month. During October he defeated Stanley Buresh and Scotty McDougall and was beaten by Tom Alley in Wellington, then wrestled King Elliott in Invercargill for a loss and Stanley Buresh in Dunedin for a win. In early November he was defeated by Stanley Pinto in Auckland in what was described as the roughest match to be held in the city, and won in a match against Scotty McDougall which received high praise as one of the best matches to be held in Auckland. He remained active in Auckland wrestling several matches throughout November and late in the month he wrestled for the British Empire championship losing the title to Canadian George Walker.

In late November 1931 Stadiums Ltd. announced plans to arrange several wrestling matches due to a decline in their boxing events and Meeske was named as part of a team of wrestlers they intended to utilise, and he returned to Australia in early December. He wrestled a draw against Tom Lurich in Sydney in January 1932 in what was described as a rough match, and won a match against Walter Browning the following week which featured Browning diving over a group of police officers standing ringside. While in Sydney he also regularly performed his vaudeville act. In February he wrestled Lurich again and was disqualified after wrestling the referee during the match which resulted in a near riot from the five thousand strong crowd, with around three thousand people having been turned away at the gate due to the venue being sold out. In late February he wrestled Walter Browning winning on points, in what was reported as a comedy match.

In February 1932 Meeske returned to Rockhampton, Queensland, to wrestle, and defeated Alec Lundin before a sellout crowd. In March he wrestled Sam Burmister in Rockhampton in what became a draw due to the referee abandoning the match, then went to Brisbane to participate in a season of wrestling which had been organized for the city. He defeated Lundin in March in his first Brisbane bout, then wrestled a draw against John Savaloff and beat Karl Stenning in April. Meeske traveled to Sydney later in April and was defeated by Tom Lurich in the city, then returned to Rockhampton before the end of the month defeating John Savaloff in a match during which he debuted a new move. In early May he wrestled in Brisbane again in a draw against Martin Bucht, then a victory against Greek Con Grevas, then beat Jack Higgins by disqualification prompting a post match brawl. In late May he wrestled in a draw against George Pencheff in what was praised as the best wrestling contest to be held in Brisbane.

At the close of May 1932 Meeske briefly relocated to Newcastle, New South Wales, wrestling a draw against Walter Browning which featured grappling with the referee, before returning to Sydney in June where he lost a match against Tom Lurich during which the referee appeared to be knocked unconscious. He then wrestled Leone Labriola during which he was disqualified prompting a brawl which was halted by police intervention. The following week he was back in Brisbane where he defeated Sam Burmister, and was disqualified in a match against George Pencheff with the police issuing him a warning due to his violence against the referee during the match. He then took a break from matches for a few weeks before wrestling a draw against Nicholas Dneprovsky, and in early July he defeated Leon Labriola. He then fought a heavyweight championship defence defeating Terrence O'Brien, and began August by defeating Dneprovsky.

In August 1932 Meeske returned to Sydney where he began his wrestling in the city with a loss to Tom Lurich, and they wrestled a highly anticipated rematch in Newcastle, which drew a record crowd, late in the month which Lurich also won. The match was regarded as disappointing with the crowd booing. He returned to Brisbane before the end of the month wrestling Martin Bucht in a match ruled a draw when the referee appeared to be knocked unconscious, and the crowd invaded the ring. They wrestled again in September with Bucht being disqualified. In September an elimination tournament was organized for the heavyweight championship title in Brisbane. Meeske participated in the tournament and he was eliminated by Sam Burmister in a semi-final, however as title holder the final was scheduled to be between him and Jack Savaloff and he retained the title. Meeske was booed by the crowd after winning, and his shirt was stolen from his dressing room later being recovered at a thrift store. In early November he faced Burmister again and successfully defended the title, and he closed the month losing to Englishman Krupps Miller in a non-title match. In early December he defended the title against Jack Savaloff again in a draw, and beat Miller in a rematch.

In January 1933 Meeske made appearances to perform vaudeville in Melbourne, before returning to Brisbane to wrestle a draw against Ted Gill, and another victory against Krupps Miller. He then went to Rockhampton and wrestled a draw with Joe Dawson with the match being delayed from its initial date due to poor ticket sales, however when it did take place it saw strong crowd reactions with the crowd supporting Dawson. He stayed in Queensland into February, beating Con Grevas and Krupps Miller in Brisbane, and Ted Gill in Rockhampton. In March he beat Joe Dawson in Brisbane in a title match, and New Zealand wrestler Nugget Potaka, with the police interrupting the Potaka match.

=== Losing the title and disputed reign ===
On 18 March 1933 Meeske faced Joe Dawson in a title match in Brisbane and lost after being disqualified for throwing punches with the crowd cheering enthusiastically for Dawson becoming the new heavyweight champion of Australia, and he then went to Rockhampton where he lost again to George Tiki. In April he relocated to New South Wales for a week where he lost to Walter Browning, and drew with George Pencheff in Newcastle, then went back to Brisbane where he beat George Taki. On April 15 he wrestled Joe Dawson for the heavyweight championship in Brisbane and won regaining the title, then went to New South Wales to promote a film of wrestlers active in Australia. In May he wrestled Alec Lundin in a draw in Newcastle, before returning to Brisbane where he beat King Elliott in a title match, and international wrestlers Nugget Potaka, Mick Dneprovsky, Emil Wagner, and George Tiki in non title matches.

In late May 1933 Meeske made arrangements to wrestle in Perth from June onwards, and in response Stadiums Ltd. organized for Tom Lurich and Bonny Muir to wrestle for the heavyweight championship in Sydney which Meeske strongly objected to. Lurich was named heavyweight champion of Australia with Meeske continuing to claim he was the title holder in early June, however Lurich responded in the press by stating that he had beaten Meeske several times although those bouts had not been classified as title matches at the time. Meeske defeated Johnny Lewis in Perth later in the month and was billed as the ex champion in reports of the bout reflecting that he had been stripped of the title. Late in the month Lurich issued a five hundred pound challenge for Meeske to wrestle him in Brisbane or Sydney to settle the matter of the title, however Meeske remained in Perth, defeating Con Grivas, expressing that he would face Lurich once his commitments in Perth were completed. At the end of June he defeated John Savelieff in Perth and the result was billed as Meeske retaining the heavyweight title although he had acknowledged Lurich's claim earlier in the month. In July he lost by disqualification Johnny Lewis, being billed as the heavyweight champion in promotion of the bout, however they were heckled by the audience with the spectacle being noted as being poor quality. He lost in a rematch against Johnny Lewis with the match again being criticized in what was his final match in his Perth sojourn.

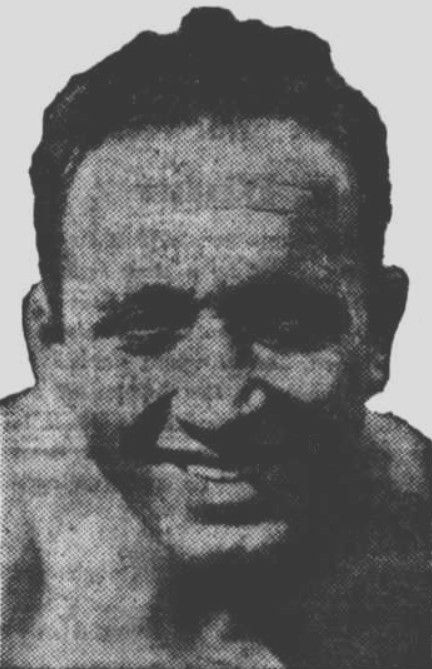
Meeske portrait, 1934.

Meeske returned to Brisbane at the end of July 1933 and defeated Leo Demetval, and Paul Egel. In August he defeated George Tiki in Brisbane and was billed as having retained the heavyweight title again, then defeated and unmasked a masked wrestler revealing them to be American Tarry Morrison. In September he defeated Joe Gotch twice in Brisbane, and Lurich reiterated his challenge for Meeske to face him to determine the heavyweight championship. In October he briefly relocated to New Zealand to wrestle and he remained recognized as heavyweight champion in Brisbane with Joe Gotch challenging him to a title match upon his return to Australia, and Brisbane media dismissed Lurich's claim to the title citing that he never faced Meeske under championship rules. He came back to Brisbane at the end of October and defeated Jerry Morrison. In early November he defeated Leo Demetral in Toowoomba, and Joe Gotsch in Brisbane and was billed as having retained the heavyweight title after both bouts.

In November 1933 Meeske returned to Sydney in order to complete his contract with Stadiums Ltd., with Sydney media touting him as the legitimate heavyweight champion upon his arrival, however he underwent surgery shortly after arriving leaving him unable to wrestle for a few weeks. He made his return to the ring in December, traveling back to Brisbane rather than wrestling in Sydney, and defeated Whiskers Blake. He then went to Newcastle and wrestled a draw with Joe Gotch, then made his return to Sydney where he was defeated by American Jack Clarke.

In January 1934 Meeske was invited to tour the United States by American wrestling promoters, but instead opted to remain in Australia losing to King Elliott in Brisbane, and defeating Whiskers Blake in what was billed as a title match for the heavyweight championship in Mackay that month. In late January he lost to Joe Gotch in Brisbane, and wrestled Whiskers Blake again in Newcastle to a draw, before wrestling in Sydney again in a draw with Bill Beth which was criticized as boring. In February he began actively antagonizing Lurich in the media challenging him to wrestle under championship rules, and he defeated Whiskers Blake in a match for Stadiums Ltd. in Sydney that month, before defeating Dick Shikat in Newcastle, and returning to Brisbane where he beat Jack Clarke, King Elliott, and Joe Gotch. In March he defeated Martin Bucht in what was billed as a grudge match then Kippasto Razgon, before losing to Martin Bucht in what was billed as a match for the heavyweight championship. Meeske acknowledged Bucht as the legitimate heavyweight champion of Australia after the match gifting him one hundred pounds after the loss. They wrestled again in a draw before the end of the month, then Meeske went to Sydney where he wrestled a draw against Joe Gotch.

=== Later career ===
Meeske was back in Queensland in April 1934 and wrestled in Ipswich where he defeated Whiskers Blake, then drew with Jack Clarke in Brisbane. Although Meeske had already dropped his claim to the heavyweight title Tom Lurich challenged him again expressing he was willing to wrestle him in Brisbane in April for the heavyweight title. Meeske wrestled a draw against Sam Burmister at the end of April with the bout being halted by the police mid-way through after the referee appeared to be knocked unconscious. In May he defeated Joe Keatos, and King Elliott, and Lurich agreed to face Meeske in Brisbane in June but stated that it would not be a title match and the booking eventually fell through. Meeske wrestled in Brisbane through to early September and in August he wrestled a novelty match inside the lion cage at Wirth's Circus. In October he briefly wrestled in Sydney, then returned to Brisbane. In November he spent time wrestling in Bundaberg, and he remained active in Queensland through to January 1935.

In January 1935 Meeske returned to Melbourne where he was cast as an actor in an adventure film set on the Great Barrier Reef, but in February he returned to Brisbane where he resumed wrestling, being billed as the British Empire heavyweight champion again. At the end of March Meeske finally faced Tom Lurich again for the Australian heavyweight title in Sydney however the bout was declared a no contest after police halted the event, and Meeske returned to Brisbane to resume wrestling in April maintaining a constant schedule of Brisbane matches into the following year. In March 1936 he faced Lurich again in Brisbane in an anticipated match which he lost, and in May he moved to Adelaide where he was billed as heavyweight champion of Australia wrestling matches until resuming his Brisbane schedule in July, which was briefly interrupted when he went back to Adelaide in August to wrestle as the British Empire heavyweight champion, and also to Melbourne where he wrestled in the first professional wrestling event held at the Princess Theatre. He toured Australia extensively wrestling in Adelaide, Brisbane, Perth, and Sydney throughout the rest of the year.

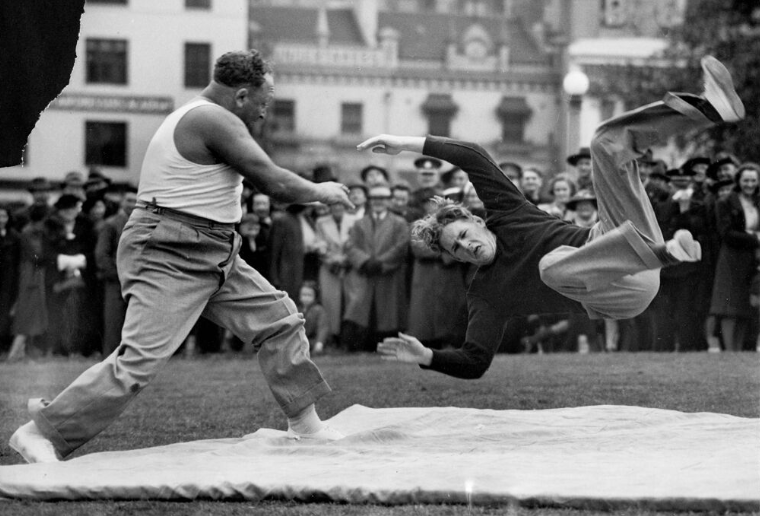
Meeske giving an unarmed defence demonstration, 1941.

Meeske maintained a busy active wrestling schedule in 1937 competing in Brisbane, Adelaide, Port Pirie, and Melbourne. He also wrestled extensively in 1938 notably in Adelaide, Brisbane, and Sydney. In July he wrestled in Adelaide as the British Empire heavyweight champion and lost the title to George Tiki announcing he intended to retire soon after the bout, however he remained active wrestling in Sydney in January 1939 where he formed a tag team with former rival Tom Lurich. He wrestled in Queensland in July, defeating Jack Clarke in Brisbane that month, then wrestled in Melbourne in low profile curtain raiser bouts from October to December.

In 1940 Meeske wrestled several matches in Carlton, Victoria, in what was billed as his return to professional wrestling, promoting himself as never having been beaten for the heavyweight championship, and in 1941 he wrestled in Adelaide. In 1942 he joined the Australian Volunteer Defence Corps being given the rank of Warrant Officer and serving as an unarmed combat instructor in New South Wales. In 1944 he issued a challenge to wrestle any heavyweight in the Australian Military in an event to raise money for the Red Cross, and he wrestled in a charity tournament for the Red Cross organized in Brisbane.

In 1946 Meeske made another comeback to wrestling in Sydney taking part in matches from May that year to January 1947. In July he wrestled in a few matches in Liverpool, New South Wales, and in December he wrestled in Fairfield.

=== In retirement ===
In 1953 Meeske volunteered to assist the New South Wales Amateur Boxing and Wrestling Association as a coach and talent scout working for free in order to assist preparations for the 1956 Melbourne Olympic Games. He died in 1970 in a home for war veterans in Sydney.

== Championships and accomplishments ==
- Professional wrestling
  - Australasian Heavyweight Championship (1 time)
  - Australasian Light Heavyweight Championship (1 time)
  - Australian Heavyweight Championship (3 times)
  - Australian Cruiserweight Championship (1 time)
  - Australian Light Heavyweight Championship (1 time)
  - British Empire/Commonwealth Heavyweight Championship (1 time)
