= Billy Kopsch =

French professional wrestler

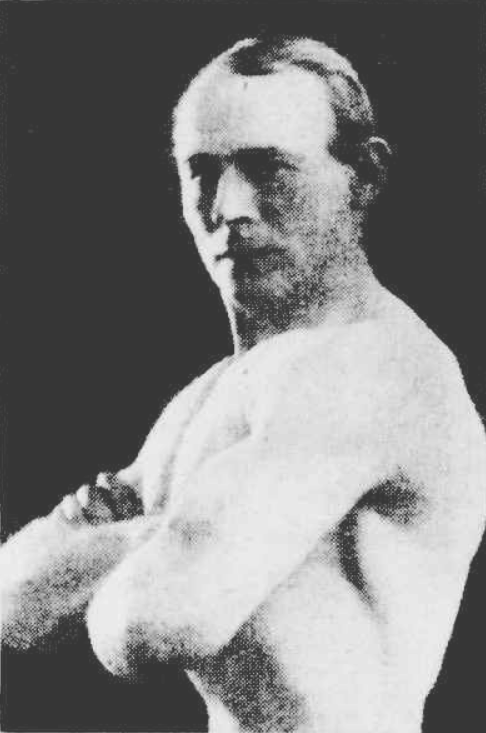

Personal information
- Born: William Kopsch Alsace, France

Professional wrestling career
- Trained by: George Hackenschmidt
- Retired: 1926

Billy Kopsch was a French professional wrestler who moved to Australia where he achieved notability.

Kopsch claimed to have been trained by George Hackenschmidt in London and competed in America before coming to Australia where he was an active professional wrestler in the early 1900s. He participated in the revival of professional wrestling in the country following the First World War and was in contention to be the Australian Heavyweight Champion and New South Wales Heavyweight Champion in the 1920s. He later disappeared.

== Biography ==
Kopsch stated that he was born in Alsace, France, in the early 1880s but emigrated to Germany where he studied medicine at Bonn University at the direction of his parents. He was expelled from the university after fighting with another student and decided to become a gymnast and was able to join a gymnastics troupe ultimately winning a tournament in Munich. He later moved to London where he studied under George Hackenschmidt and then Iceland to study Glíma. He ultimately moved to America where he performed as a professional wrestler, and claimed to have come to Australia to wrestle alongside George Hackenschmidt when he toured the country in 1905 choosing to settle in Broken Hill.

Kopsch attempted to establish himself as a professional wrestler after arriving in Australia, wrestling Buttan Singh in 1906, however his efforts were curtailed when the First World War caused Australian professional wrestling to almost cease to exist. He was able to establish a gymnasium in Broken Hill, and achieved notoriety for claiming to drink bull blood and eat raw steak to build strength, and staging a publicity stunt in which two men used hammers to break a large rock placed on his chest.

In the early 1920s Billy Meeske attempted to revive Australian professional wrestling actively promoting himself as the countries heavyweight champion and in January 1922 Kopsch publicly issued a challenge to Meeske or the retired Clarence Weber to wrestle him for the championship with Meeske accepting the challenge. Later the same month the newly established company Country Stadiums Ltd. arranged for Meeske and Kopsch to wrestle in Geelong attempting to assume responsibility for professional wrestling in Australia, however as of April the bout had still not taken place with Kopsch having received no further communication regarding it. In August 1922 Meeske instead organized to wrestle Joe Bailey for the title, winning and being dubbed heavyweight champion of Australia in November.

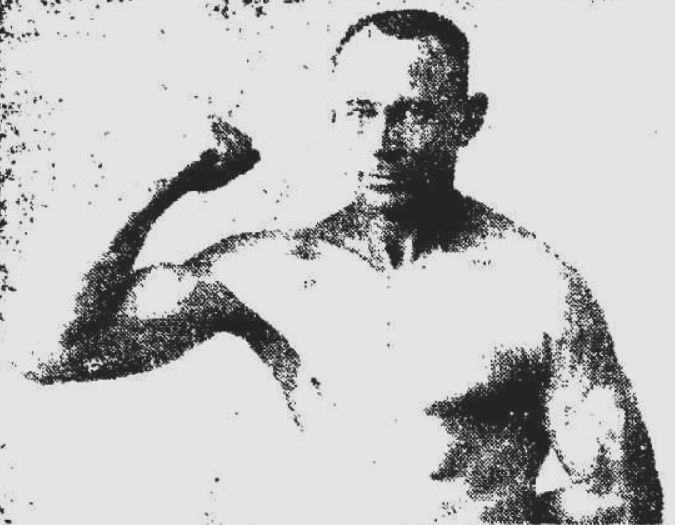
Billy Kopsch, 1923.

In December 1922 Kopsch issued another challenge to Meeske for the championship, and in February 1923 Meeske agreed to arrange a match. They faced each other in May before a large crowd in Melbourne with Meeske defeating him decisively, with Kopsch appearing to suffer a dislocated shoulder. They wrestled a second time in June with Meeske winning a second time, and later in the month Kopsch also wrestled South African Jim McMurdo losing a third time. In August Kopsch challenged Meeske again this time to a jiu-jitsu match, with strangle-holds permitted and Kopsch, being billed as a Russian, lost again. He then left Melbourne returning to Broken Hill.

In April 1924 Jim McMurdo's manager contacted Kopsch to attempt to organize another match, and in June he returned to the ring wrestling New Zealander Theo Gadding, billed as champion of New Zealand, in a draw in Broken Hill. In December 1925 he wrestled again against Samuel Burmister in Broken Hill in a match billed as being for the heavyweight championship of New South Wales which he lost, claiming a wrist injury. He next wrestled in January 1926 being easily defeated by Mahomet Ali Sunni, and he promoted Sunni's wrestling credentials after the bout, participating in his match against Peter Limutkin from ringside later that month, and promoting his match against Jim McMurdo in February. He arranged wrestling exhibitions to promote professional wrestling in Broken Hill in February.

Kopsch fell into obscurity and disappeared with his nephew writing to the Broken Hill city council to request any information on his whereabouts in 1946, and the local Broken Hill police requesting information on his whereabouts in 1948.
