= Peter Fatouros =

Greek-Australian wrestler

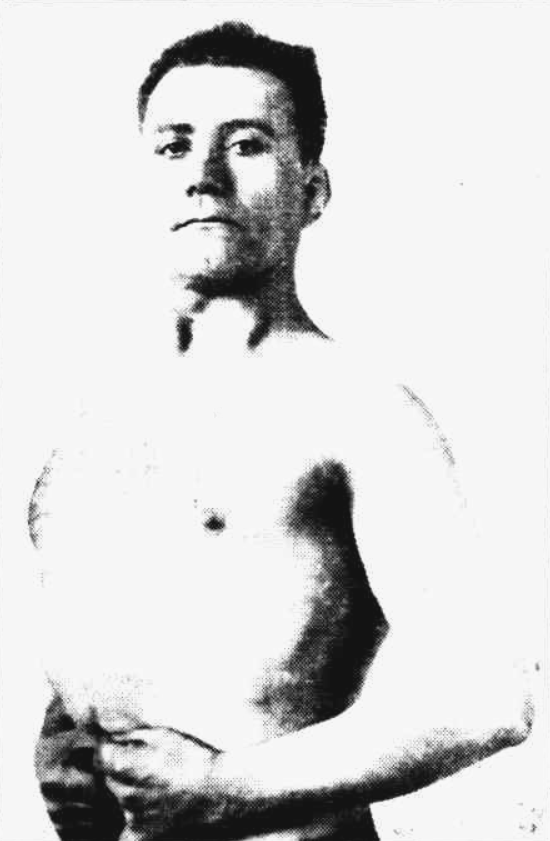

Personal information
- Born: Speros Peter Fatouros c. 1891 Greece
- Died: 1953 Melbourne, Australia

Professional wrestling career
- Trained by: Clarence Weber
- Debut: 1914
- Retired: 1931

Peter Fatouros (1891 - 1953) was a Greek-Australian wrestler who was active in the 1920s and 1930s and was a contender for the Australian Heavyweight Championship. He was also known for running a fish and chips shop in Melbourne.

== Biography ==
Fatouros was born in Greece in approximately 1891 and moved to Australia in 1912. He began wrestling after arriving in Australia, training under Clarence Weber and Oscar Wasem. He had matches in Melbourne in 1914 and 1915, however the First World War led to a significant decline in the professional wrestling industry in Australia.

In the early 1920s, Australian professional wrestling experienced a revival, and Fatouros began training with visiting American Walter Miller and Con Keatos in 1924. In April that year he achieved a small level of fame when he secured a match against Australian heavyweight champion Billy Meeske, however the match was cancelled when Meeske injured his hand. He did not have a match until September when he wrestled in a loss to Charles Honroth, and afterwards he began training with Meeske.

In April 1925, Fatouros assisted American wrestler Ted Thye when Thye toured Australia, serving as a cornerman during his matches. In July he was promoted as a sparring partner of Al Karasick, and billed as the heavyweight champion of Victoria when he visited Queensland to wrestle Jim Sank in a victory. He next wrestled in Broken Hill, New South Wales, in January 1926 in a loss to Mahomet Ali Sunni, then defeated Hughie Whitman in February. While in Broken Hill he also worked with Billy Kopsch to perform wrestling exhibitions to promote the industry, and wrestled in another loss to Sunni at the end of February. He next wrestled in May in a draw with Sam Burmister in Melbourne.

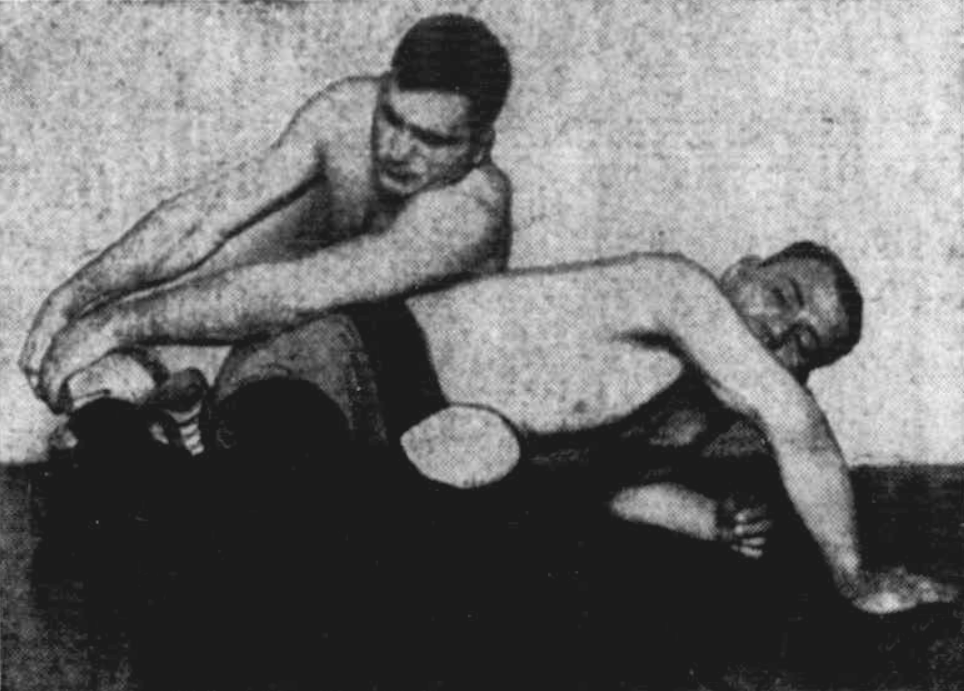
Louis Pergantas applying a toehold to Fatouros, 1927.

As of November 1926, Fatouros had become the owner of a Cafe on Punt Road in Melbourne and that month he and two of his employees were involved in a brawl with four customers, when Fatouros informed them they could not drink alcohol at the Cafe and they then refused to pay for their food. He was not involved in wrestling publicly again until June 1927 when he gave a wrestling exhibition with Louis Pergantas, to promote the fellow Greek wrestler who he was training. In September he became manager of the Whiteway Fish Cafe on Sydney Road in Melbourne, and he wrestled Burmister again this time in South Australia in a draw at the end of October. In December he lost to heavyweight champion Billy Meeske in a match in Yarrawonga, Victoria.

In January 1928 Fatouros wrestled in a loss to former heavyweight champion Clarence Weber in Tasmania, and in April and May he wrestled losses to American Jack Sorensen in Newcastle. In June he wrestled in Newcastle again in a match billed as being for qualification for a title match against Meeske, losing to Socks McKenna. He wrestled in Newcastle again in July losing to Scotty McDougall however the match was described as a disappointment due to Fatouros dominating until losing in the final round, and in October he wrestled in Sydney losing to Count Zarynoff.

In February 1929 Fatouros publicly complained publicly about not being booked to wrestle, and at the end of the month he organized a fundraiser for Jack Brown, a boxer who had become blind. In July he wrestled in a draw against Bert Asker in Melbourne in what was his last match for a few years. He returned to the ring for his last match in 1931 when he was booked to face heavyweight champion Billy Meeske in Brunswick, however as he was known in the suburb for owning a local fish and chips shop the audience laughed when he was announced with the match, won by Meeske, being viewed as a comedy bout, and afterwards the promoter refused to pay Fatouros.

After his match with Meeske Fatouros focused on his cafe but retained some fame with a visit he made to Broken Hill in 1945 receiving coverage in a local newspaper due to his former wrestling career. He died in Melbourne in 1953.
