= Charles Honroth =

Australian professional wrestler

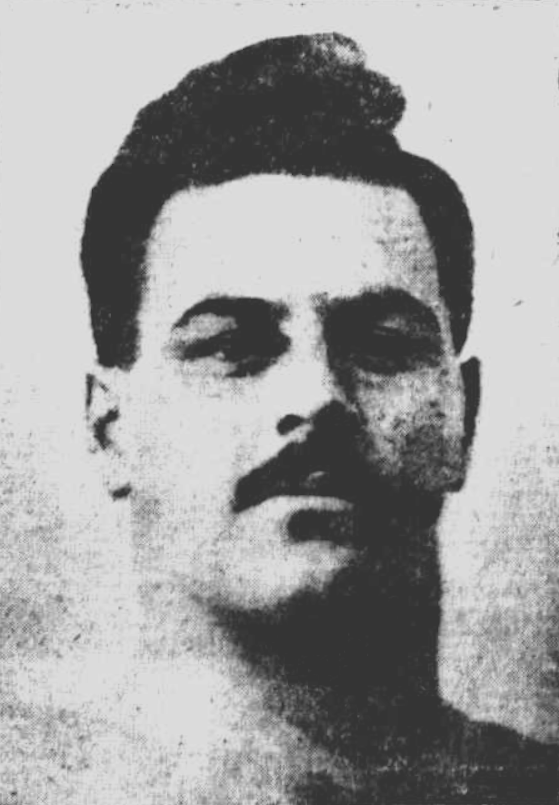

Personal information
- Born: Charles Robert W. Honroth c. 1897
- Died: February 10, 1976

Professional wrestling career
- Trained by: Clarence Weber
- Debut: 1923
- Retired: 1936

Charles Honroth (1897–February 10, 1976) was an Australian professional wrestler who was active in the 1920s revival of professional wrestling in Australia contending for the Australian Heavyweight Championship and being billed as the heavyweight champion of South Australia from 1927 to 1936.

== Biography ==
Honroth was born in 1897. He began studying wrestling in 1918 training at Weber and Rice's gymnasium in Melbourne, also becoming an employee of the business. He attempted to become an active professional wrestler in 1922, with the public endorsement of his trainer former heavyweight champion Clarence Weber. He made his debut in June 1923 defeating Jim McMurdo then lost to heavyweight champion Billy Meeske in a title match in Melbourne. His next match was a victory against Floria Franish in September, in what was described as an unexciting bout, in November he wrestled a draw with Jim McMurdo, then in December he went on hiatus from wrestling for a holiday.

In January 1924 Honroth was described as having the potential to become as good as Clarence Weber the reigning heavyweight champion, and was booked to wrestle Meeske for the cruiserweight championship with promotion of the match emphasizing that his training with Weber and improvement since his last match with Meeske. He lost to Meeske in February, however reporting noted he had improved considerably, although the match was described as featuring too much defense to be a spectacle. In May a rematch was booked between Honroth and Jim McMurdo, which Honroth won after an even bout. He then fell ill with influenza leaving him unable to wrestle although he continued working as a trainer for the Weber and Rice gymnasium, and was able to conduct wrestling exhibitions with Weber. He returned to the ring in September defeating Peter Fatouros, and in December he faced Australian amateur heavyweight wrestling champion Jim Heslin in his professional wrestling debut winning on points.

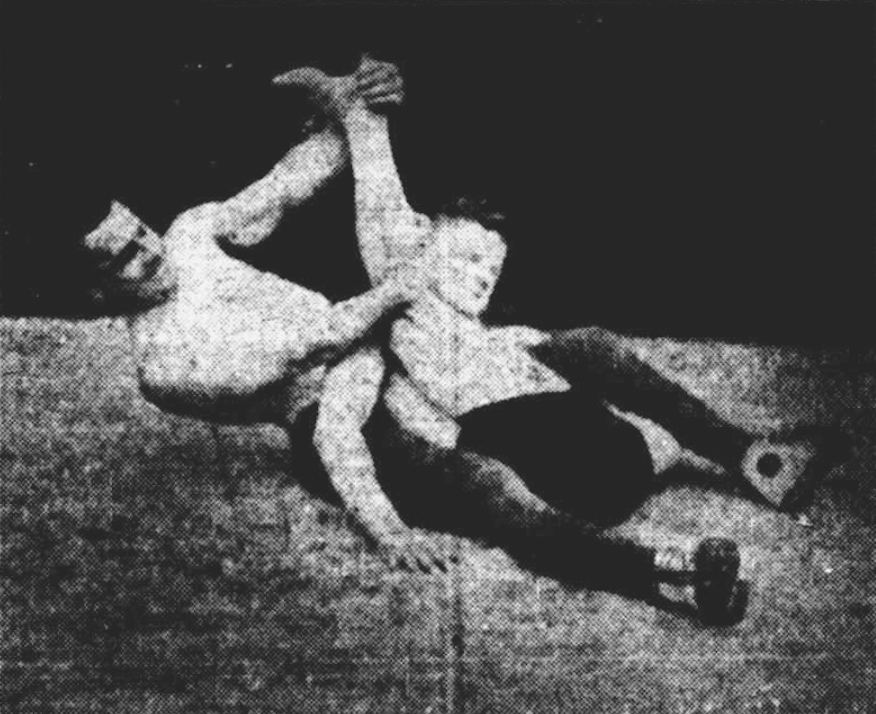
Honroth demonstrating a wrestling hold on Hughie Whitman, 1927.

In March 1925 Honroth performed demonstrations alongside Clarence Weber to promote professional wrestling and the Weber and Rice gymnasium. In April he rescued a man in Bairnsdale who was drowning after a boat collision, and the same month he married and embarked on his honeymoon. In March 1926 he returned to the ring losing in a rematch to Jim Heslin. He then performed wrestling demonstrations to promote the profession, but did not have another match until July when he defeated Fred Bromley.

In September 1926 Honroth moved to Adelaide to work for the Adelaide branch of the Weber and Rice fitness business which was now named the Weber, Shorthouse & Rice Health and Strength College, and in October Clarence Weber visited Adelaide to give wrestling demonstrations with him. He was not actively involved in wrestling again until July 1927 when he served as a referee for a match between American wrestlers Ted Thye and Mike Yokel who had a match in Adelaide, and in August he refereed a match between Walter Miller and Al Karasick also in Adelaide. In October he wrestled Harry Titchen in a match billed as being to determine the heavyweight champion of South Australia and won the bout.

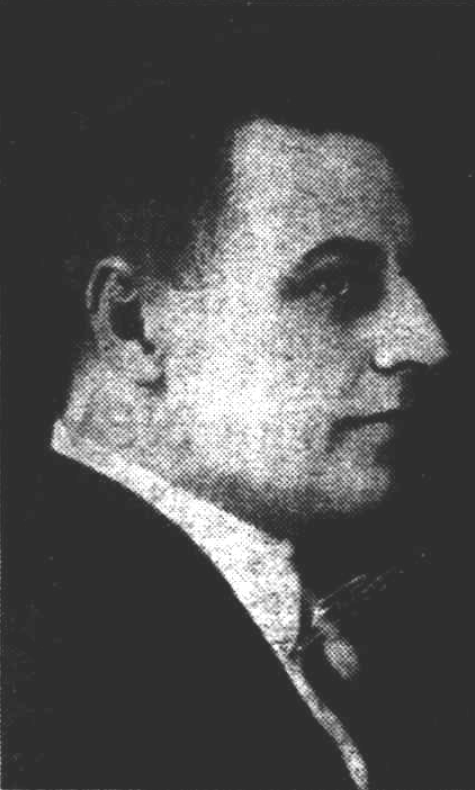
Charles Honroth, 1930.

In September 1928 Honroth publicly challenged Billy Meeske for the heavyweight championship of Australia stating that he had been sidelined from the professional wrestling scene since moving to Adelaide but felt he was just as entitled to the championship as other active wrestlers, and Meeske accepted the challenge although a match was not booked. Honroth continued to serve as a referee for wrestling bouts in Adelaide and by 1929 it was what he was best known for, not wrestling again himself until July 1930 when he defeated Leon Labriola in Port Pirie and lost to Sam Burmister in Adelaide. He wrestled again in October 1931, billed as the heavyweight champion of South Australia, against Alf Walloscheck, and in 1932 he defeated John Lewis in Adelaide.

In November 1933 Honroth wrestled Bruce Robertson in Adelaide in a match billed as being a title defence of the South Australian heavyweight championship and he won retaining the title, and in December 1934 he was named South Australia's most perfect man in a physical culture competition held in Melbourne. In July 1936 he wrestled in a victory against Leo Demetral in Adelaide being billed as again retaining the South Australia heavyweight title. In 1937 he established a massage parlor in Adelaide, advertising himself as the cities leading specialist in physical therapeutics, with the business operating until at least 1942 and Honroth being in the news as a masseuse at late as 1945.

Honroth died in 1976 and was buried in Enfield Memorial Park.
