= Joe Bailey (wrestler) =

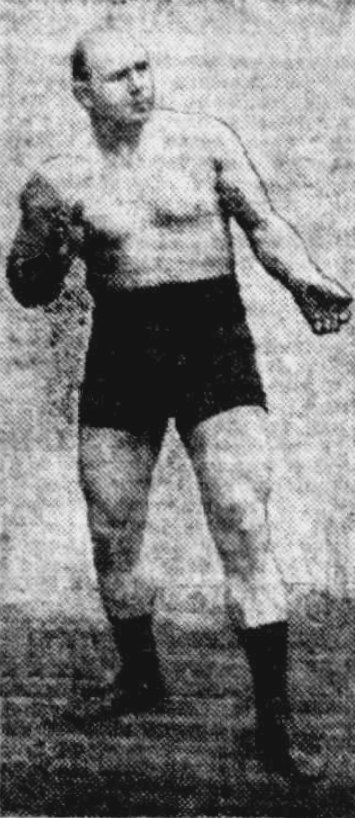

Professional wrestling career

Joe Bailey (c. 1886 - 28 January 1951) was an Australian professional wrestler most notable for losing to Billy Meeske in a match to determine the Australian Heavyweight Championship in 1922. He was also an all-round sportsman competing in football, amateur wrestling, and competitive cycling.

== Biography ==
Bailey was an amateur wrestler before taking up professional wrestling, beginning his career by asking to be trained at Fred Porter's gymnasium and impressing with his ability to lift weights. He was a respected heavyweight as of 1913, and was Australian amateur heavyweight champion by 1914. He continued wrestling during the First World War, beating a J. McKenna in a bout at the Railway Institute in Melbourne in 1917. In 1918 he helped organize an Athletics Programme in Melbourne as part of a Police Charity Carnival.

In 1920 Bailey was one of two wrestlers to be able to throw Australian Olympic prospect Roy Jenkin during his training at the Victorian Railways Institute, although he lost to him in the Ballarat Championship later in the year. As of 1921 Bailey had begun training boxers.

As of 1922 professional wrestling had almost ceased to exist in Australia since the First World War and the company Country Stadiums Ltd. aimed to re-establish it. The professional wrestling Heavyweight Championship had been vacated when Clarence Weber retired in 1913, and in August a meeting of Victorian professional wrestlers was held at which it was determined that Joe Bailey and Billy Meeske had the best claims to be heavyweight champion and a match between them was scheduled. Meeske promoted the fight by antagonizing Bailey by publicly wagering money and suggesting that Bailey may not show due to cowardice. They wrestled for the heavyweight championship on November 22 at Melbourne Stadium, and Bailey lost leading to Meeske becoming champion.

Bailey did not consider returning to the ring until July 1923 when he began training again, however no match was scheduled. In 1927 he announced he was willing to wrestle any heavyweight in Melbourne, and in October 1927 he refereed a match between Ted Thye and Walter Miller in Launceston. In 1928 a Launceston promoter offered to book him, with Sam Burmeister agreeing to wrestle him in the city in May, although it is not clear if the match ultimately took place.

As of 1930 Bailey had begun coaching boxers in Melbourne, and he coached boxing and amateur wrestling up until a few months before his passing.
