= Eddie Scarf =

Australian wrestler

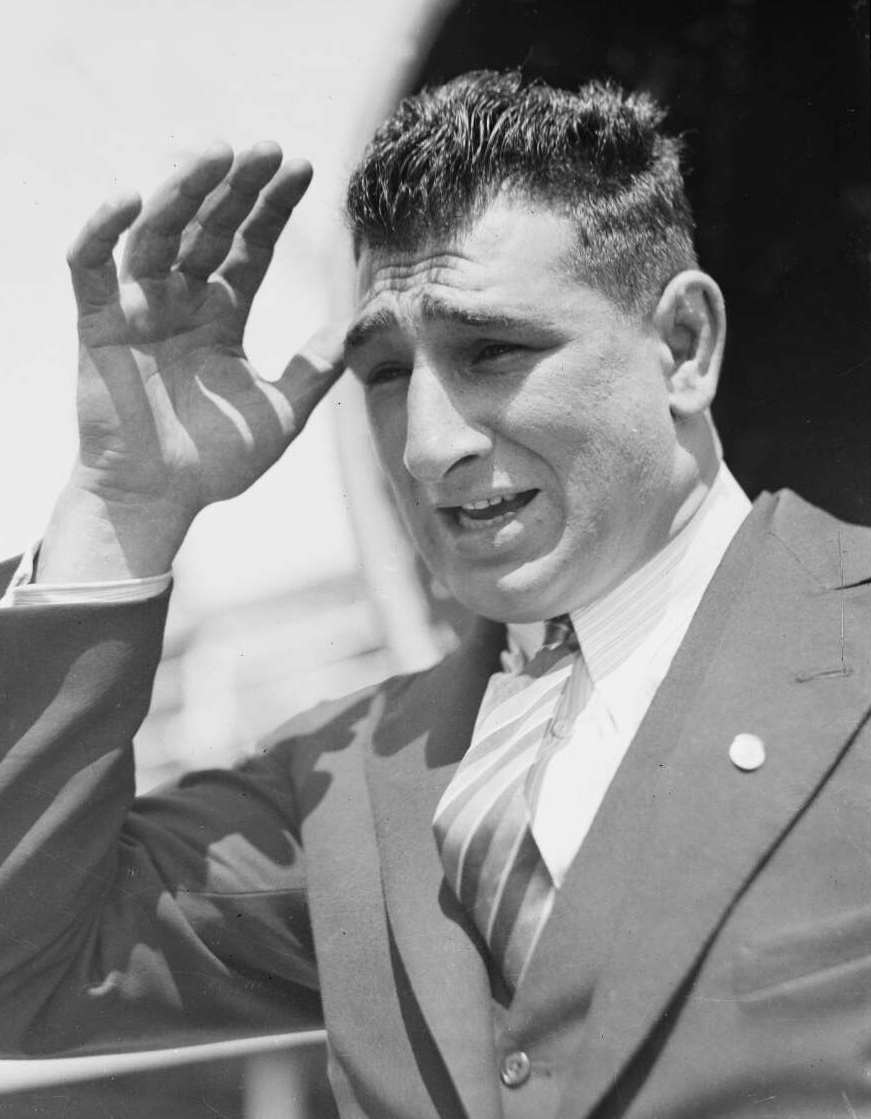
- Scarf in the 1930s

Personal information
- Full name: Edward Richard Scarf
- Nickname: Eddie
- Nationality: Australian
- Born: 3 November 1908 Quirindi, New South Wales
- Died: 7 January 1980 (aged 71) Camperdown, New South Wales
- Education: Marist College North Shore
- Occupation: Butcher
- Height: 180 cm (5 ft 11 in)
- Weight: 99 kg (218 lb)
- Spouse: Edna May Gale

Sport
- Country: Australia
- Sport: Wrestling, boxing
- Weight class: middleweight, light heavyweight, heavyweight
Medal record
Men's freestyle wrestling
Representing Australia
Olympic Games
Bronze medal – third place	1932 Los Angeles	Light heavyweight
British Empire Games
Gold medal – first place	1938 Sydney	Light heavyweight

Edward Richard Scarf (3 November 1908 – 7 January 1980) was an Australian wrestler and boxer. He was Olympic bronze medalist in freestyle wrestling in 1932, and also competed at the 1936 Olympics.

== Early life ==
He was born in Quirindi in New South Wales. He was the fourth child of Michael Eli Scarf and Amelia, née Zraysarty, who had both migrated from Lebanon. He attended Marist Brothers School in North Sydney.

== Career ==
In February 1938, Scarf won the wrestling gold medal at the Empire Games in Sydney in the light heavyweight division. His victory came in spite of pulling a muscle in his right thigh during the preliminary rounds. In November that year he turned professional and moved up to the heavyweight class in order to compete in a competition sponsored by Stadiums Limited to determine the heavyweight professional champion of Australia. He had been training with American wrestlers, Ray Steele, Dean Detton, and Bobby Roberts. He was crowned professional champion by defeating Jim Bartlett of New Zealand one fall to nil in four rounds. He retained hs title the following year. In 1940, he famously beat Chief Little Wolf on points, using Little Wolf's signature move, the Indian deathlock against him.

On 29 April 1941 Scarf enlisted in the Royal Australian Air Force as a storekeeper. He served with the Parachute Training Unit from 1943 and in 1944 participated in an exhibition wrestling match with Jerry Visscher during a boxing tournament in Madang, New Guinea. He was discharged from the R.A.A.F. on 7 February 1945.

== Personal life ==
In 1942, Scarf married Edna May Gale at the Church of Our Lady of Dolours in Chatswood. They had one daughter and two sons. After the war, he focused on his butchery business, opening new shops across the Northern Beaches at North Narrabeen, Dee Why and Palm Beach. He also became active in community and charity work. He was a founding member of the Warringah Rotary Club, a member of the Dee Why Surf Life Saving Club and president and first patron of The House with No Steps. He died on 7 January 1980 at Camperdown and is buried in Mona Vale cemetery.
