= Bill Verna =

Australian professional wrestler (born 1929)

Personal information
- Born: 1929 Perth, Western Australia

Professional wrestling career
- Ring name: Bill Verna
- Billed height: 5 ft 10 in (1.78 m)
- Billed weight: 267 lb (121 kg; 19.1 st) (at his heaviest)
- Debut: 1950
- Retired: 1966

Bill Verna (born 1929), also known as Big Bill Verna, is an Australian professional wrestler. He wrestled throughout the world during his 20-year career, especially in his adopted country of Great Britain, winning the All European Championship and the British Empire/Commonwealth Heavyweight Championship during the 1950s. One of the first major heels in Joint Promotions, he was mentioned by "Exotic" Adrian Street as one of the wrestlers who helped shape professional wrestling in Britain.

== Biography ==
Bill Verna was born in Perth, Western Australia in 1929. He moved to Belgium in 1947 and adopted freestyle wrestling as his profession. When he became a pro wrestler, he weighed around 224 pounds, and stood 5 feet and 10 inches in height. He trained for two to three hours each morning and raised his weight to 280 pounds. After settling in Britain, he traveled the world to wrestle but continued to return to Britain to face such wrestlers as Billy Two Rivers, Gord Nelson, and Paul "Butcher" Vachon. He also faced, but was defeated by, Lou Thesz in a match that took place in Brighton, East Sussex. In 1948, he wrestled in the main event at a show at Happy World Stadium in Singapore. In the sixth round, he was knocked out by Dara Singh. He then wrestled a series of matches against Jagindar Singh, defeating him in the main event of a show on 4 September and again on 16 October. The following January, he was again knocked out during a match in Singapore. Competing against Jejl Goldstein, he was hit and fell out of the ring and on to a fan at ringside. Two months later, he collapsed during a match; as a result, his opponent, King Kong, was awarded the victory.

Verna fought more than 2000 wrestling bouts. In 1952, he won the All European Championship. Bill married a Singaporean in 1954 while he was living in Belgium. In the mid-1950s, he wrestled in Pakistan as a face. During this time, he was outspoken against the Pakistani media, as he objected to them always depicting local wrestlers controlling matches against foreign wrestlers. While he was competing, Verna's best friend was Wrestling Observer Newsletter Hall of Famer Bert Assirati, although the two had matches in which both wrestlers made each other bleed quite a bit. Verna explained in an interview that neither man held back because they did not want the fans to "complain that they did not enjoy the fight".

While competing against Pakistani wrestler Akram Pahalwan, Verna's opponent suffered a dislocated left shoulder that forced Pahalwan to take a break from wrestling. Verna later held the British Empire/Commonwealth Heavyweight Championship in the 1950s before dropping the title to Geoff Portz during a match in Newcastle, New South Wales in 1959. He also defeated Phil Siki, the heavyweight champion of the West Indies, in a match at Cambridge Road Baths. In the summer of 1960, he headlined wrestling events held at the California Ballroom in bouts against Francis Sullivan and Ray Hunter. In the 1960s, Verna appeared regularly on televised wrestling programs in Britain. These were some of the earliest televised matches broadcast in the United Kingdom and, between 1961–62, were promoted by Joint Promotions. Among his opponents included Frankie Townsend and Bill Rawlings. He wrestled as a heel and gained the hatred of many fans. In March 1966, Verna agreed to serve as a last minute replacement for the "flu-struck" Wayne Bridges in his match against Dennis Mitchell at Royal Albert Hall. Verna scored a submission victory in the second round but was knocked out by Mitchell in the next round.

In Pakistan, where Verna spent most of his career, the journal Ash Shuja featured Verna in a 1955 story. He was said to be "appreciated and admired as a player throughout the world". It also stated that he was "acknowledged with great respect among the famous wrestlers of the world".

== Championships and accomplishments ==
- Other titles
  - All European Championship (1 time)
  - British Empire/Commonwealth Heavyweight Championship (1 time)
