= British Empire/Commonwealth Heavyweight Championship =

Details
- Promotion: Joint Promotions; British Wrestling Federation; All Star Wrestling
Statistics
- First champion(s): Scotty McDougall
- Final champion(s): Count Bartelli

The British Empire/Commonwealth Heavyweight Championship was one of the first Heavyweight professional wrestling championships in the United Kingdom and Australia

The championship was recognised and defended on matches screened by UK national television network ITV as part of the professional wrestling slot on World of Sport as well as standalone broadcasts. Pre-publicity for these championship match broadcasts was given in ITV's nationally published listings magazine TVTimes The retirement of final champion Count Bartelli in 1986 received coverage from sources such as ITN.

== Title history ==
Wrestler:	Times:	Date won:	Location:	Notes:
Scotty McDougall	1	29/07/20	Newcastle, New South Wales	
Billy Meeske	1	1931	New South Wales	
Douglas Clark	1	1936		
Tom Lurich	1	36/05/30	Sydney	
George Pencheff	1	37/07/22	Melbourne	
Alan Muir	1	38/02/24		Holds both British and British Empire Titles as of 38/02/24
Earl McCready	1	38/08/23	Melbourne	George Clark vs George Pencheff on 38/12/13 in Castleford, GBR (champion unknown)
Bill Verna	1		Melbourne	
Geoff Portz	1	1959	Newcastle, New South Wales	
Vic Stewart	1		Brisbane, Queensland	
Ray Hunter	2		Brisbane, Queensland	
Allen Garfield	1		New South Wales	
Ray Hunter	3		Sydney	
Don Steadman	1	64/03/04	London	
Ray Hunter	3	64/10/14	London	
Laurie Boyd	1		New South Wales	
Count Bartelli	1	1969	Adelaide, South Australia	
George Gordienko	1	1971	Newcastle, New South Wales	
Albert Wall	1	72/01/08	Hanley, Staffordshire	
Count Bartelli	2	72/09/02	Hanley, Staffordshire	
Hans Streiger	1	1981	Liverpool	
Count Bartelli	3	1981	Melbourne	Title retired on 86/01/18 when Bartelli retires

== See also ==
- Professional wrestling in the United Kingdom
