= Fred Atkins =

Canadian wrestler (1910–1988)

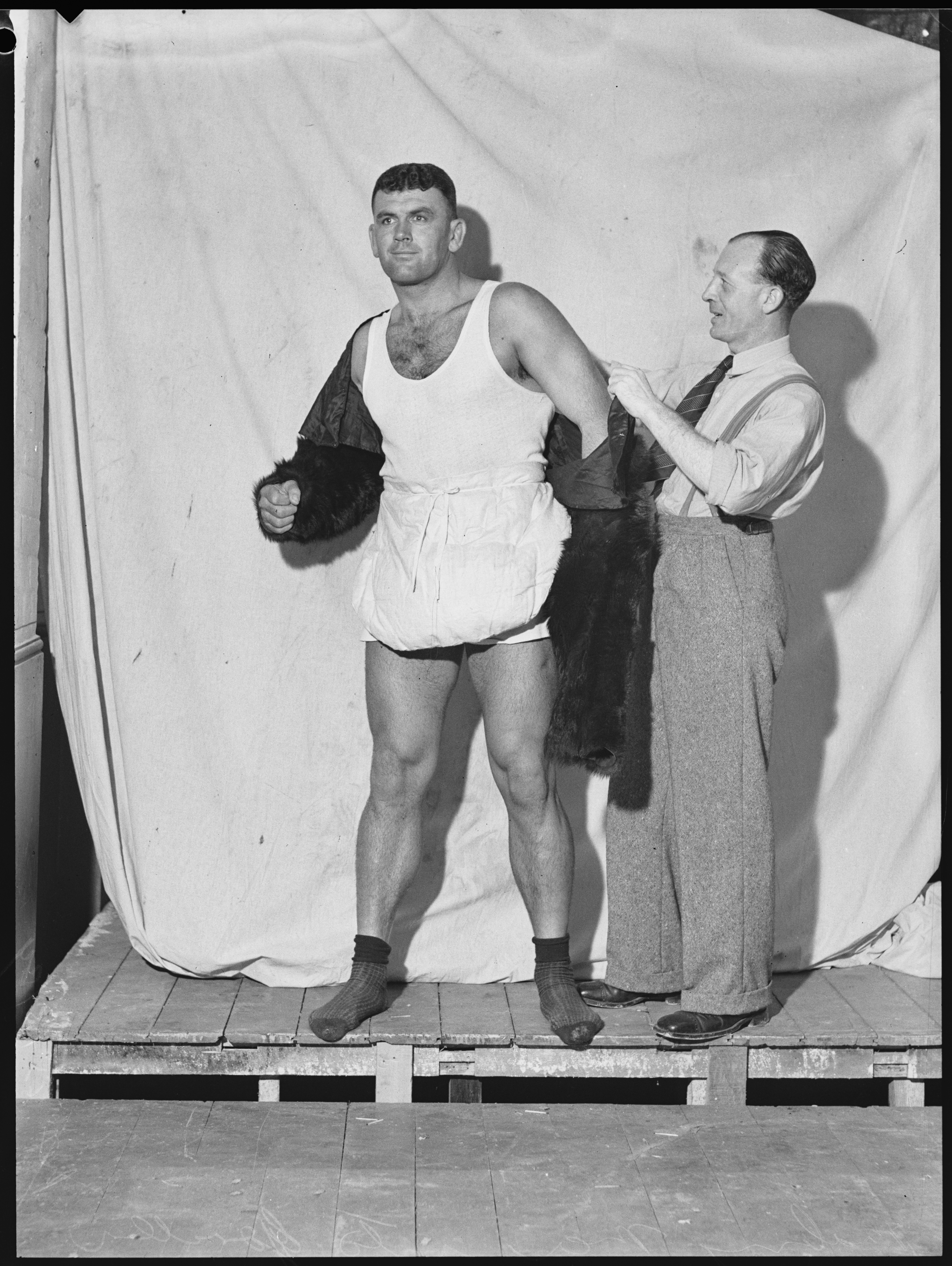
- Fred Atkins at Cinesound Studio, Sydney, 21 February 1939

Personal information
- Born: Fred Atkinson; 1910 Westport, New Zealand
- Died: May 14, 1988 (aged 77–78) Welland, Ontario, Canada

Professional wrestling career
- Ring name(s): The Brute; Fred Atkins; Fred Atkinson
- Billed height: 6 ft 0 in (1.83 m)
- Billed weight: 240 lb (110 kg; 17 st)
- Debut: late 1930s
- Retired: 1974

Fred Atkinson (1910 – May 14, 1988), better known by his ring name Fred Atkins, was a New Zealand-born Canadian professional wrestler, trainer, referee, manager, and announcer, best known for his time with Maple Leaf Wrestling.

== Early life ==
Atkinson was born in Westport, New Zealand. He worked in the Australian outback cutting railway ties during the Great Depression. Atkinson spent his spare time wrestling for exercise and recreation. He wrestled as an amateur wrestler for five years before turning pro during World War II.

== Professional wrestling career ==
Footage of a match between Aktins and Laverne Baxter at Sydney Stadium in 1947

Footage of a match between Aktins and Chief Little Wolf, also in Sydney in 1947

Atkinson first wrestled as an amateur in New Zealand before turning pro in the late 1930s. On October 10, 1942, he defeated Pat Meehan in a tournament final to win the Australian Heavyweight Championship. He wrestled in New Zealand, Australia and Singapore into the mid-1940s. Atkinson's bout against world champion Jim Londos in November 1946 was held at Sydney Stadium in front of a record setting 14,000 spectators. Atkinson remained champion for several years until leaving the country in 1949. From there, he immigrated to Canada where he started a long association with Toronto promoter Frank Tunney. While Atkins was not flashy compared to his fellow wrestlers he put on strong efforts as a heel.

As well as Toronto he appeared in St. Louis and Chicago facing the likes of Moose Cholak, Sweet Daddy Siki, Pat Flanagan, Lou Thesz, Whipper Billy Watson and Pat O'Connor. For a time he also appeared in San Francisco. In Toronto he pulled a major victory over Watson for the NWA British Empire Championship before losing it back to him. Into the 1960s he became a popular and respected baby face but again turned heel as a manager mainly to the men he also trained like Giant Shoehi Baba and Tiger Jeet Singh. Atkinson also worked as a pre-season conditioning trainer for the Toronto Maple Leafs hockey club.

Later he worked as a referee for the Tunney promotion and wrestled his final match in 1974 at age 63. He lived in Crystal Beach, Ontario, near Fort Erie and when training wrestlers would have them run along a Lake Erie beach on the sand to build their leg strength. As a referee he was no nonsense. If a wrestler wouldn't let go of a hold Atkins would shove an elbow in his face. At Maple Leaf Gardens he refereed the February 6, 1977, NWA World Heavyweight title match in which Harley Race beat Terry Funk for the championship. On another card between Superstar Billy Graham and prelim Terry Yorkston he angrily removed his shirt and threatened to go at Graham as Graham roughed up Yorkston after the match. In 1977 he looked after follow longtime wrestler Lee Henning in his home until Henning died there of cancer. As the Tunney promotion went through changes holding cards for the American Wrestling Association, NWA Mid-Atlantic and the World Wrestling Federation he stayed on as a referee while working as a trainer for the Buffalo Sabres hockey club and later for the Toronto Maple Leafs.

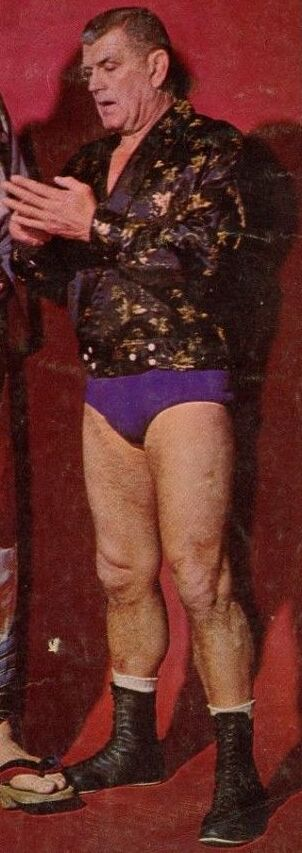
Atkins in 1964

== Championships and accomplishments ==
- Championship Wrestling from Florida
  - NWA Southern Heavyweight Championship (Florida version) (1 time)
- Maple Leaf Wrestling
  - NWA British Empire Heavyweight Championship (Toronto version) (1 time)
  - NWA Canadian Open Tag Team Championship (1 time) - with Lord Athol Layton
  - NWA International Tag Team Championship (Toronto version) (4 times) - with Professor Hiro (3) and Tiger Jeet Singh (1)
- Mid-South Sports
  - NWA International Tag Team Championship (Georgia version) (1 time) - with Ike Eakins
- NWA San Francisco
  - NWA World Tag Team Championship (San Francisco version) (1 time) - with Ray Eckert
  - NWA Pacific Coast Tag Team Championship (San Francisco version) (3 times) - with Ray Eckert
- Other titles
  - Australian Heavyweight Championship (1 time)
  - Silver Belt Australian Heavyweight Championship (1 time)
