= Tom Lurich =

Polish professional wrestler

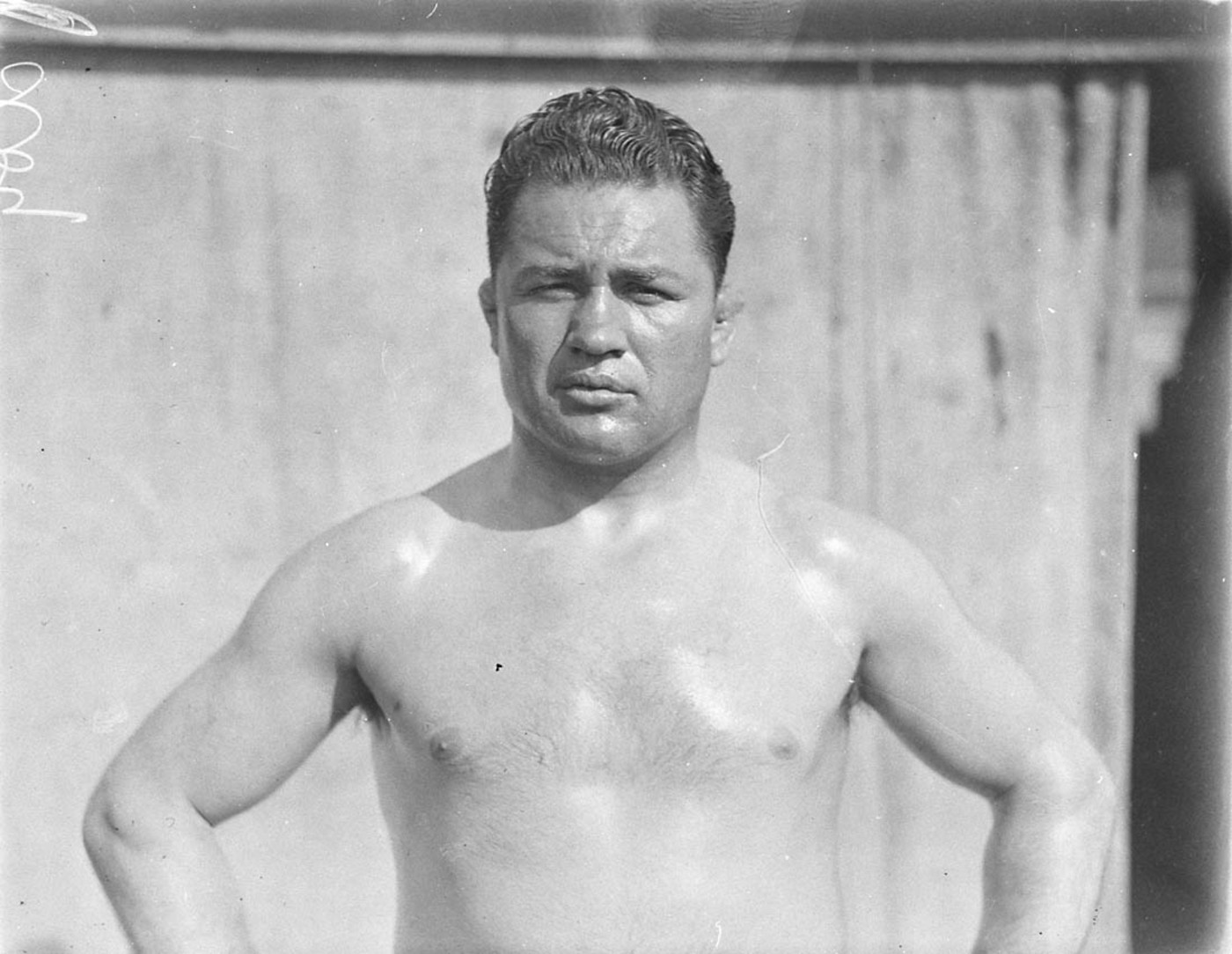

Personal information
- Born: Tom Lurich; 1897 Russian Empire
- Died: 21 November 1968

Professional wrestling career

Tom Lurich (1897 – November 1968) was a Polish professional wrestler.

== Championships and accomplishments ==
- Professional wrestling
  - Australian Heavyweight Championship (1 time)
  - British Empire/Commonwealth Heavyweight Championship (1 time)
