= Buttan Singh =

Australian professional wrestler (1863–1939)

- Photograph of Buttan Singh, Chicago, Illinois, USA (pre-1929)

Personal information
- Born: 1863 Punjab, British Raj
- Died: after 1934

Professional wrestling career
- Billed height: 5 ft 9.5 in (1.765 m)
- Billed weight: 11 st 7 lb (73 kg; 161 lb)

Buttan Singh (born 1863; occasionally reported as 'Buttin Singh') was a professional wrestler in Australia, with a catch-as-catch-can style, and billed as one of the 'champion Hindu wrestlers of Australia', and 'champion of the world' by others. Singh was given to be 'a model for the young wrestlers of his day'.

Singh was one of several Australian wrestlers of Indian heritage, from the early 1900s, including Massa Singh (born 1860), and Gunga Brahm (c. 1872–February 1916). At one time he was part of Wirth Brothers Circus' stable of athletes.

== Early life ==
Singh was born in the Punjab region of the British Raj (now India) in 1863.

He arrived in Australia from the Punjab in 1900. While newspapers and documents referred to him and others as 'Hindoo', he was recognised as being of the Sikh religion. It was suggested he was the greatest wrestler India had ever known. Trying to grow the branch of the sport in eastern Australia, he later moved to Western Australia and worked with another Sikh in a hawking business, while continuing to do catch-as-catch-can wrestling.

It was indicated Singh's brother was Dava Singh, who by 1931 was living in Carlton, Victoria and now blind.

== Wrestling career ==
Throughout his career, Singh was generally regarded as a polite, quietly-spoken gentleman, especially when compared to the more boastful Brahm. Singh was described as tall and wiry, a commanding figure, deeply-bronzed and very clear skin, white teeth, trimmed moustache, penetrating dark eyes, does not bore with anecdotes, and 'had beaten all the great wrestlers [of the world] except the giant, George Hackenschmidt, and was even prepared to back his comparatively diminutive frame against the colossal strength of Sandow'.

It was reported that Singh did club swinging, weighing up to 100 pounds (45 kg), which aided his substantial grip. Singh also wore a small silver charm around his neck, from when he was a boy, that he called 'Buttan's Luck'. At one point, Singh was managed by W. H. 'Billy' Williams (d. 19 July 1929).

1900

On Saturday 9 June 1900 at the Victoria Hall in Melbourne, the best-of-three contest took part between Singh 'of India' and William Pagel (1878–1948) of Germany, stated to be a revival in wrestling. It was reported Singh, lithe and sinewy, weighing 12 stone 7 pounds (79 kg; 175 lb), had 'held the belt' against all-comers for many years, winning 82 of 85 matches. Pagal on the other hand was 13 stone (180 lb; 83 kg) and the 'Champion strong man of Germany'. Two shoulders on the floor at one time constituted a fall. The catch-as-catch-can or Lancashire wrestling rules included for the match were:

1. Either opponent may press his arm against his antagonist's throat.
2. Kicking the limbs shall be considered fair.
3. No fall to count unless one party is thrown on his back: two shoulders touching the floor at the same time to constitute a fall.
4. The match to consist of first fall, best two in three or three in five, according to the mutual understanding.
5. No less than 10 or more than 20 minutes' rest allowed between each wrestling bout.
6. Letting go either hand, changing holds, or grabbing by the legs shall be allowed.
7. The ring, when practicable, to be 24 square feet (2.2 m^{2}).
8. All bets to go with the stakes. The stake-holder or his deputy to announce on the ground publicly at all times, when the match is not concluded, which way the stakes go.
9. If the referee be not chosen in the articles, and the wrestler or backers cannot agree to appoint one within fifteen minutes from the time of entering the ring, the stakeholder shall appoint one.
10. In all matches the wrestlers must be in stocking feet or bare-footed, and they will not be permitted to scratch, throttle, or pull each other's ears, or commit any unfair act towards each other. Neither will they be allowed to be rubbed with grease, resin, or any other pernicious drug on any part of their bodies. The competitors will be allowed one second each, who must not be changed during the continuance of the match; neither will a second be allowed to touch his own or his opponent's man when wrestling; touching either competitor while in the act of wrestling will be a disqualification against the offender and his party, and the referee shall decide against them. If the wrestlers entangle with what may be considered the boundary of the ring, they shall draw off and renew the contest with the same hold as when they drew off.
11. Should any match not be finished on the day appointed, both wrestlers to meet, weigh, and commence wrestling at the some time place day by day (Sundays excepted) until the match is finished, except otherwise agreed upon; but in the event of one wrestler gaining a throw in any match, and the said match be not finished, the wrestler winning the throw to claim the stokes in the absence of any arrangement to continue the match. In the event of a wrestler giving up 1he match when he has won a back fall, the stokes shall be claimed by his opponent.

Many spectators in red turbans and Singh's attendant Jack Graham saw him take the first fall at 23 minutes and 30 seconds. After a couple of rushes, Pagel starting to show being out of condition, a neck hold on the ropes, a necklock, and a foot hammerlock, saw the second fall and match to Singh at 12 minutes 30 seconds.

Singh followed up with a competition against 6 feet (1.8 m)-tall Victorian wrestler Jack Graham in December 1900 at the Democratic Club, Melbourne. Singh took the first bout in 3 minutes 45 seconds, and the second in 4 minutes 40 seconds, using leg holds and neck locks, before Singh threw Graham.

1901

Monday 15 April 1901 saw a wrestling match between Jim McDermott, from Newcastle, New South Wales, and Singh, at Melbourne's Democratic Club, for the 'championship of Australia'. The 'Champion of NSW', McDermott had never been thrown by anyone within 1 stone (14 lb; 6.4 kg) of his weight. After delays starting due to selecting a judge acceptable to both parties, the first bout saw McDermott go for a neck hold but soon Singh took him to the mat and put on a strong underhold. After a struggle they were sitting on the ropes. Restarting in the centre, after various grapples, Singh lifted McDermott in the air, throwing him, then had Singh's legs wrapped locked around McDermott's neck, being slowly worked around the carpet until McDermott cried 'He's breaking my jaw'. After a four-minute first bout, McDermott withdrew from the second bout due to boils on the arm, resulting in Singh being declared the winner.

1903

Wirth's Circus in Melbourne was to see a closely contested wrestling match between Singh and Brahm on Thursday 30 April 1903, with a substantial wager for the championship of Australia. It was noted the contest would be genuine that caste prejudice precluded any arrangements as Brahm was a Brahmin while Singh was a Sikh. Friends of Brahm were going to make various religious invocations that would assure his victory. Before 3000 people, the first bout went to Brahm after fifty minutes, Singh secured the second with a fall in 6.5 minutes, and the third and final bout lasted only four minutes, with the championship being retained by Brahm.

Later defending the championship of Australia in the catch style was held at Sydney's National Sporting Club on 28 October 1903 between the now-champion Singh and former champion Brahm; with an agreement that 'neither shall oil or grease himself in the slightest degree', a reference to Brahm's claim that in the recent match at the circus, Singh had rubbed fat or other substance over his body.

1904

In January 1904, Singh was to wrestle Brahm in the catch style, the best two-out-of-three bouts, at Her Majesty's Theatre in Kalgoorlie.

By early April 1904, Singh was staying in Melbourne, and responded to a challenge to New Zealand champion wrestler, Robert James 'Bob' Scott, whether in Australia or New Zealand. Scheduled for 17 March at Greymouth, New Zealand with his travel costs, it appears Singh did not attend (instead the bout was between George Riordan and Sunda Singh). In June 1905, Scott arrived in Melbourne and looked forward to taking on the victor of the Weber–Singh match.

In May 1904 (also reported as October 1904, and 6 November 1904), with the Wirth Brothers Circus, offering £10 for any person he could not pin in 15 minutes, 42-year-old Singh wrestled the 24-year-old Clarence Weber (1882–1930). Whilst years before Tom Cannon had taken the championship from Jack Connor using a strangle hold without issue, and it was not debarred from the competition, it was not accepted this time from the crowds. With the 3 stone (42 lb; 19 kg) heavier Weber prostrate across the ground intending to wait out the time unpinned, Singh used the unpopular but legitimate strangle; but it nearly resulted in a riot. '[T]he infuriated spectators chased Buttan Singh from the building because he had used the strangle hold on Weber'.

1905

It was recounted in 'an Eastern city', at Melbourne's Exhibition Building on 11 February 1905 before 7000 spectators, Singh and Brahm separately competed against Estonian strongman 'The Russian Lion' George Hackenschmidt (1877–1968) in the same ring, although both were dispatched by the Estonian quickly. While Brahm had strutted out in a long red velvet coat trimmed with gold cord, Singh stepped onto the mat without 'no gorgeous rainment covering the lithe Sihk. He stood there nude, except for his usual scanty trunks'. Prior to the competition Hackenschmidt was advised 'Watch Buttan, he gets very slippery after he's been wrestling a bit', to which Hack replied, 'He won't have time to get slippery'. Hack weighed about 15 stone (210 lb; 95 kg) to Singh's around 12 stone (170 lb; 76 kg). Singh was shaken violently and whirled around Hackenschmidt's shoulders and hurled into the mat, such that Singh had to be assisted home. It was considered the earlier 'dirty' upon Weber had been cleanly revenged. Hack had 'the old Hindoo master' 'as flat as a pancake in 9min. 45sec.'.

1906

July 1906 saw Weber arranged for another match with his arch-rival Singh, referencing the earlier May 1904 acrimonious outcome. An agreement saw the Cyclorama, Melbourne, on Monday evening, 19 November 1906 booked for their fourth and final meeting. 'It was a fair dinkum and actual wrestling according to the rules of the game. The men wrestled for supremacy, a side wager, and a percentage of the gate receipts.' The 'white and massive' 14 stone 3 pounds (90 kg; 199 lb) Weber commenced with a Cumberland clip (swing the leg, striking the opponent above the ankle, and simultaneously throwing the body off-balance) to the 'dusky, muscular body' of 11 stone 12 pounds (75 kg; 166 lb) Singh. Regaining his feet, Singh went to the mat again from another clip. Weber executed half-Nelsons and head-holds, with a bar across the face, but shortly after Singh became 'top dog'. With a grapevine on Weber's left knee, and with Weber now facing quitting or a broken leg, Singh was awarded the bout at 14 minutes and 24.5 seconds. After the ten minute break, the second bout saw an unhappy but determined Weber take immediately to Singh, picking him up and shaking him, and going from a bar Nelson to a half Nelson, to take the bout at 13 minutes and 33.75 seconds. With a bleeding nose and unsettled in the ring post-second bout, Singh threw in the towel; Weber was declared the overall winner.

1908

On Friday 12 June 1908 at the Melbourne Athletic Club, Exhibition Street, in the catch-as-catch-can wrestling style, Singh competed with George Dinnie (1875–1939). Singh was billed by Wirth Brothers Circus as one of the 'champion Hindu wrestlers of Australia'. The meeting between the 'burly Scotchman and the sinewy Hindu', weighing 14 stone 10 pounds (93 kg; 206 lb) and 11 stone 4 pounds (72 kg; 158 lb)) respectively, saw Singh use Dinnie's force to his own advantage, with a result that neither man could throw the other: 'Dinnie was too heavy and powerful for Buttan to pin to the mat, and Buttan was too clever for Dinnie. After an hour and a-quarter's wrestling, during which Buttan gave an exhibition of wonderful skill, a draw was declared'.

The 'famous Hindoo exponent' Buttan Singh met 'the English champion' Peter Bannon several times. In their first meeting, with no fall secured, the contest was declared a draw. Their second meeting had Singh securing two of the three falls. On Saturday evening, 8 August 1908, at Melbourne's City Baths Athletic Hall they came together for the 'championship of Australia'. Evenly matched, with only 1 pound (0.45 kg) weight difference, the first seven minutes was about hold manoeuvring, before Bannon was taken to the ground. Singh, using a leg hold and a scissor hold, could not secure a fall. Bannon countered with a sitting waist lock. At twenty-five minutes, Singh had Bannon in a back waist hold, who escaped to use a half Nelson, for which Singh eluded. Bannon secured the first fall at 64 minutes with a half Nelson. Ten minutes later and the second bout saw Singh secure a fall with a barlock in 12 minutes and 50 seconds. For an additional twenty minutes, neither wrestler secured a fall, and the contest was declared a draw.

A return match between Dinnie and Singh for the 'championship of Australia' and £100 on Saturday night, 15 August 1908, was organised, with Dinnie securing two out of the three falls, 'his great strength telling'. Dinnie at the time weighed 13 stone 10 pounds (87 kg; 192 lb), to Singh's 11 stone 6 pounds (73 kg; 160 lb).

By October Gunga Brahm was advertising in the newspapers to get invited to the series of matches between Singh, George Dinnie, and Peter Bannon. This was separate to Singh's challenge to matches with any wrestlers within Australia.

1910

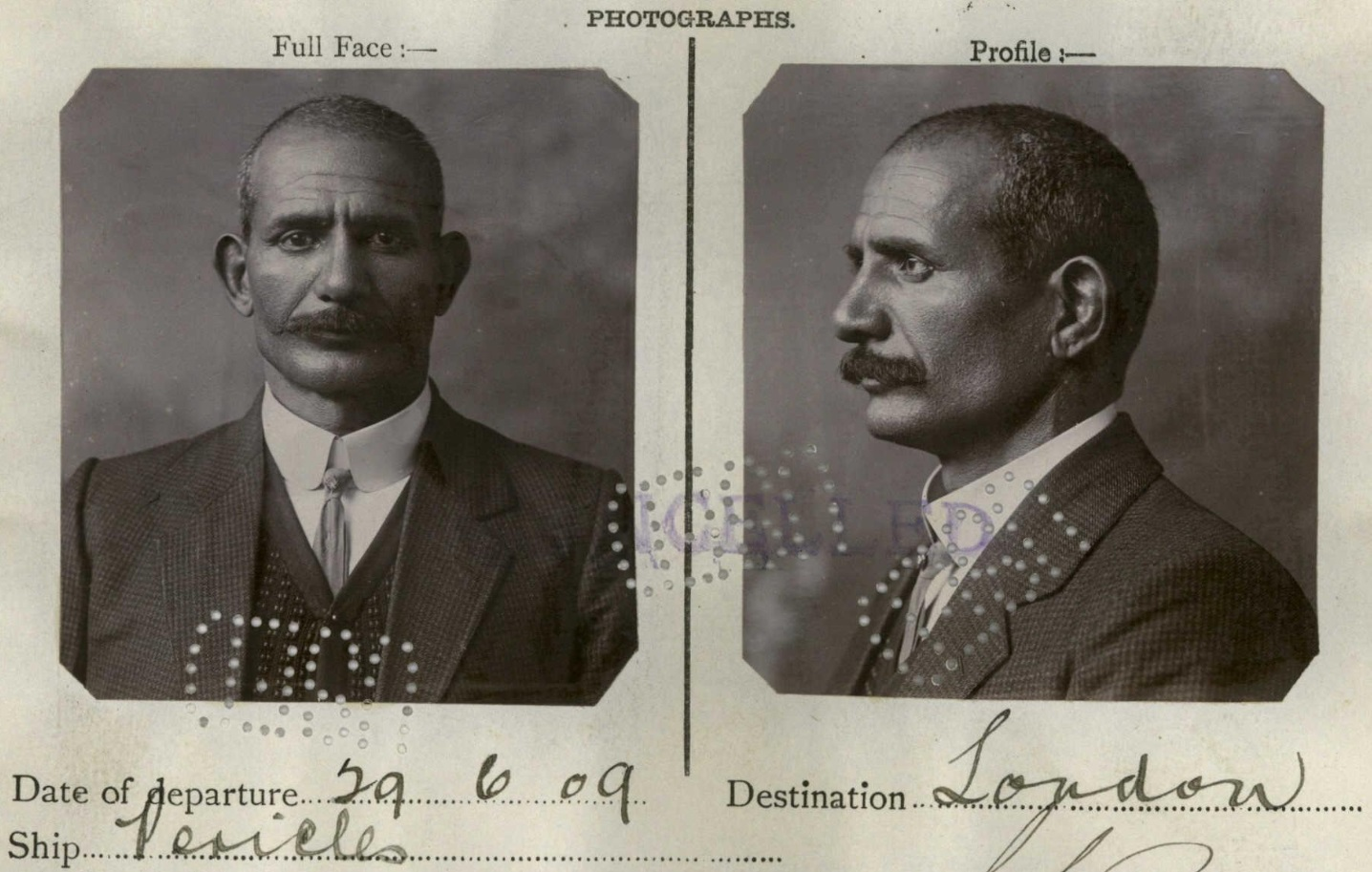
Photograph (1909) of Singh

Involving the dictation test issued under Australia's Immigration Restriction Act 1901, on 28 June 1909 from Western Australia, Singh was issued a certificate to exempt him from the test should he return to Australia. At this time he was described as 5 feet 9.5 inches (1.765 m) height, dark complexion, black hair, black eyes, and a 'thick set build'. Having already competed with Peter Bannon and Massa Singh, he departed for London on 29 June 1909 on board the short-lived SS Pericles, returning on the SS Roon, disembarking at Fremantle on 17 June 1912.

While wrestling in England he beat Bob Berry, Jack Winrow, Jack Whistler, and others, but most notably, the all-conquering Henry Irslinger. Irslinger was a veteran already at twenty-one weighed 11 stone 4.5 pounds (71.9 kg; 158.5 lb), to Singh's 11 stone 0.75 pounds (70.19 kg; 154.75 lb) at 46 years of age, when they met in York for a £100 purse and £25 side-wager. With double-barred Nelsons and strangle-holds prohibited, after four continuous and punishing hours without a fall, Irslinger gave in, and Singh was declared 'champion of the world'. A mustachioed Singh appeared on the 1910 Taddy wrestler cigarette card.

Buttan Singh also demonstrated his skill in the United States of America. Whilst not comparing the day's current wrestlers to their predecessors, he did not care for the Boston crab, toeholds, and other grips, indicating it spoiled a clean sport.

== Later life ==
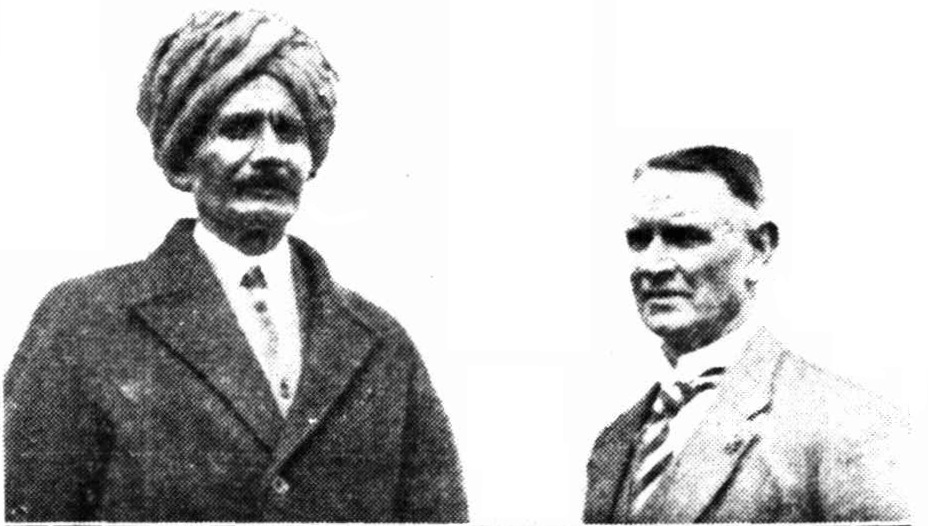
Singh, and Wirth's Circus advance manager, Charlie Peterson, in Perth, September 1929

Singh allegedly by July 1906 'had taken unto himself a wife and a pub, so his time was fully occupied in attending to the beer and telling Desdemona of the battles he had waged on the mat'.

With the death of wrestler Gunga Brahm in February 1916, Singh was one of the campaigners to have him cremated instead of buried, in accordance with the Sikh religion. Brahm's ashes were then to be sent to India to be thrown into the Ganges.

Advertised as the 'Hindoo Wonder Worker', Singh appeared as the 'exceptional vaudeville attraction' at the Carlton Theatre, Kogarah, southern Sydney, for Saturday 27 August 1927.

Singh was well-alive by 1929 where a report of his death was a mistaken identity ("Whereupon the old fellow skipper around to the office of a Perth daily [newspaper] to indignantly and emphatically deny the rumor"), in early 1932 was at Wiluna, Western Australia, at a local welterweight event, and was present at the Luxor Theatre, Perth, match in October 1934. Singh's whereabouts and life after 1934 have not been found.

== Championships and accomplishments ==
- Professional wrestling
  - Australasian Heavyweight Championship (1 time)
  - Australian Heavyweight Championship (1 time)

== See also ==
- Indian Australians
