= Australian Heavyweight Championship =

Statistics
- First champion: "Professor" William Miller
- Final champion: Billy White Wolf
- Most reigns: Billy Meeske and Fred Atkins (3)

The Australian Heavyweight Wrestling Championship was the first Heavyweight professional wrestling championship in Australia.

== History ==
In September 1885 Australian William Miller wrestled American Clarence Whistler in Australia in a match billed as being to decide the champion of the world with Whistler winning the bout. Whistler would later die in November of that year.

A later mention of a wrestling championship for Australia being actively contested came in April 1901 when Jim McDermott, billed as champion of New South Wales, challenged Indian wrestler Buttan Singh to a bout to determine the champion of Australia, which Singh won on April 16. When Singh lost to Gunga Brahm in April 1903 Brahm was billed as the new champion of Australia, holding the title until losing to Abdul Kadir in February 1904 who was a late stand in for Singh who was injured. Kadir's win was ignored a week later when Buttan Singh and Gunga Brahm were billed as wrestling for the Australian Championship, with Singh winning. Singh was billed as champion throughout 1904 and 1905, holding the title until losing to Clarence Weber on November 20, 1906.

Weber remained champion until the First World War disrupted professional wrestling in Australia. After the war Billy Meeske attempted to revive professional wrestling and in 1920 he challenged Weber for the heavyweight championship, however he was advised Weber had officially retired in 1913 and as such claimed to hold the title by default. Due to the lack of organisation, many professional bookings fell through and the newspaper The Sporting Globe hosted a meeting of professional wrestlers, chaired by Weber, at which it was decided Meeske and Joe Bailey were the two wrestlers with the best claim to the heavyweight championship. A bout was scheduled for November 22, 1922, which Meeske won, becoming recognized as the undisputed champion of Australia. On September 1, 1923, Weber came out of retirement and took the title back from Meeske, holding it until September 18, 1926, when Meeske beat him in a rematch. Meeske often lost to visiting international wrestlers during his title reigns, however it had been decided that wrestlers who had lived in Australia for less than six months were ineligible for Australian titles, allowing him a long reign.

In December 1932 the company Stadiums Ltd. booked a match between Tom Lurich and Bonnie Muir as a championship decider. This was due to Meeske not wrestling at their stadium in Sydney for an extended period. This decision was met with criticism from the public, with Lurich responding by arguing that he had beaten Meeske previously, although as a foreigner he had been ineligible for the title at the time of his victories under the established rules. Despite the decision Meeske continued to be billed as the champion in Western Australia and Queensland.

The first Lurich-Muir match was a draw and Stadiums then booked several wrestlers to face Lurich promoting him as having defeated every notable wrestler in the country except for Muir. In March 1934 Meeske lost to Martin Bucht and acknowledged Bucht as the new heavyweight champion, while Stadiums Ltd. named Lurich heavyweight champion after he finally defeated Muir in June. Meeske resumed billing himself as the heavyweight champion in 1936, and the same year Billy Bayne claimed to be heavyweight champion based on having beaten Martin Bucht.

In 1938 a bout between Eddie Scarf and Jim Bartlett was billed as being for the heavyweight championship with Scarf being reported as champion after his win, however Lurich continued to be billed as the unbeaten reigning heavyweight champion by Stadiums Ltd. until dropping the title to George Pencheff in December, 1939. Leo Demetral issued a public claim to be the only legitimate heavyweight champion of Australia in July 1940 based on having beaten Billy Meeske in a match in 1938, ignoring Bucht's earlier victory, and he challenged others to wrestle him for the title, losing it to Fred Atkins in August. Atkins and Pencheff wrestled each other in October 1940 however the match was ruled a non title bout by both their promoters, with Atkins ultimately winning. Atkins agreed to wrestle Pencheff again in January 1941 however he was ultimately unable to participate in the match due to travel problems, although on February 1 it was reported Pencheff had defeated Atkins unifying the title claims.

== Title history ==
Wrestler:	Times:	Date won:	Location:	Notes:
"Professor" William Miller	1	before 1880	New South Wales	
Clarence Whistler	1	1885/10/26	New South Wales	
Vacant/Abandoned				Whistler Died in 1885
Harry Pearce	1	1894	Perth	
Buttan Singh	1	1903	Melbourne	
Clarence Weber	1	1906/11	Melbourne	
Vacant		1915		Weber retired
Billy Meeske	1	1922/11/22	Melbourne	Defeated Joe Bailey in a tournament final
Clarence Weber	2	1923/09/01	Melbourne	
Billy Meeske	2	1926/09/18	Melbourne	
Joe Dawson	1	1933/03/18	Brisbane	
Billy Meeske	3	1933/04/15	Brisbane	Ordered to defend title at Leichhardt Stadium in 33, but refused
Tom Lurich	1	1933/06/03	New South Wales	Defeats Bonny Muir to win the Leichhardt Stadium version after Meeske refuses to defend the title. Eddie Scarf defeats Jim Barlett in tournament final to win the Stadiums Limited version in 38 and defend it at least until 41 Meeske loses in earlier round. Leo Demetral claims the title in 38.
Eddie Scarf	1	1938	Sydney Stadium, Rushcutters Bay	Defeated Chief Little Wolf
George Pencheff	1	1939/12/09	Sydney	Still recognised as champion of 47; Fred Atkins defeats Leo Demetral to claim the title in 40; Pencheff defeats Atkins on 40/12/07 in Broken Hill to unify the two versions
Fred Atkins	1	1942/10/10	Sydney	Defeated Pat Meehan in a tournament final and left the country in 1949
Fred Atkins	2	1944		
Fred Atkins	3	1947		
Leo Jensen	1	1952/12/03	Leichhardt	Defends against Bonnie Muir on this day
Rocky Riley	1	1953	Leichhardt	Defeated Alf Greer in a tournament final.
George Pencheff	2	1955	New South Wales	Returned from overseas and claimed the title
Baron Von Heczy	1	1957/02/04	Adelaide	
Kangaroo Kennedy	1	1962/04/14	Newcastle	
Brian Ashby	1	1965/05	New South Wales	
Larry O'Dea	1	1965/05/07	Sydney	
Earl Black	1	1966/01/28	Melbourne	
Billy White Wolf	1	1967/01/28	Melbourne	Wins tournament for the title
Vacant/Abandoned		1967/02/11	Melbourne	White Wolf won the IWA World Heavyweight Championship

== See also ==
- Professional wrestling in Australia
