= Sydney Stadium =

Sporting and entertainment venue in Sydney

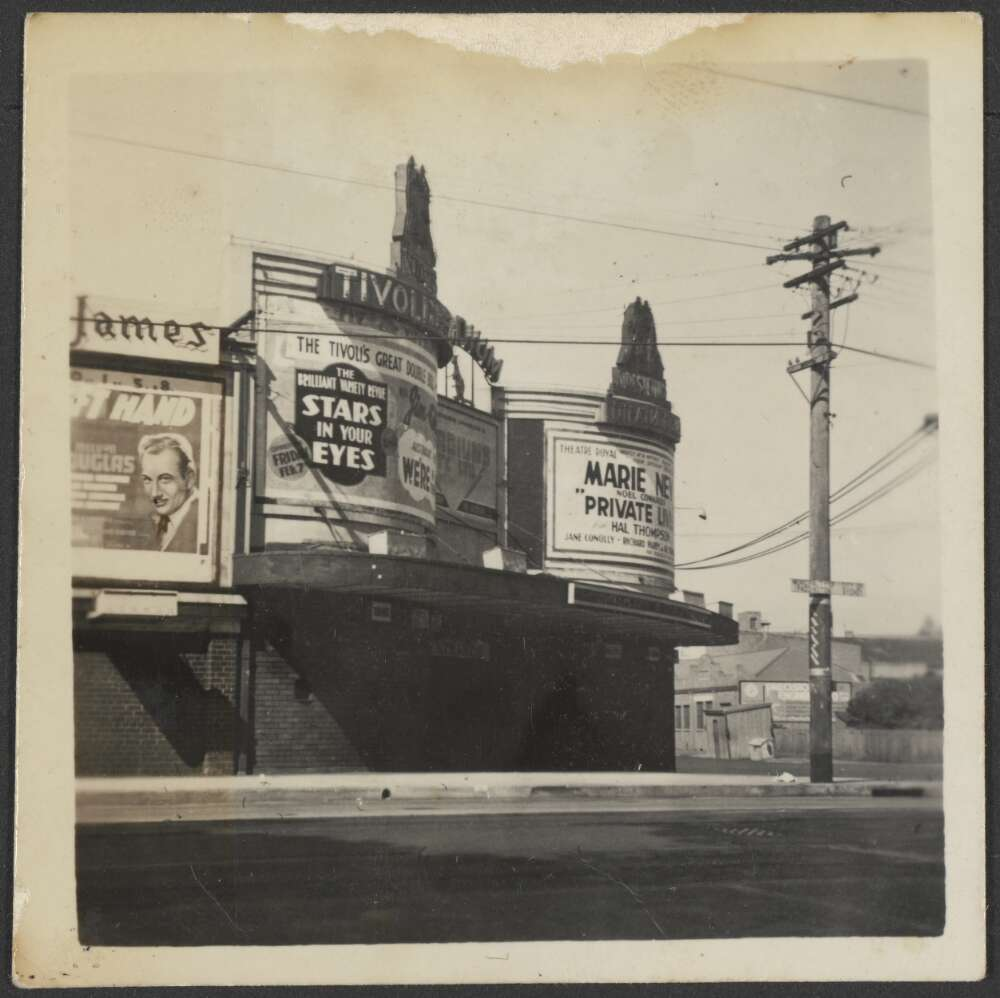
- Sydney Stadium c1941
- Interactive map of Sydney Stadium
- Address: Neild Ave
- Location: Rushcutters Bay
- Coordinates: 33°52′37″S 151°13′49″E
- Owner: Stadiums Limited
- Capacity: 15,000
- Type: Stadium
- Events: music, concerts, sporting events

Construction
- Architect: In 1912 an indoor facility was built to a design by T.P. Sampson

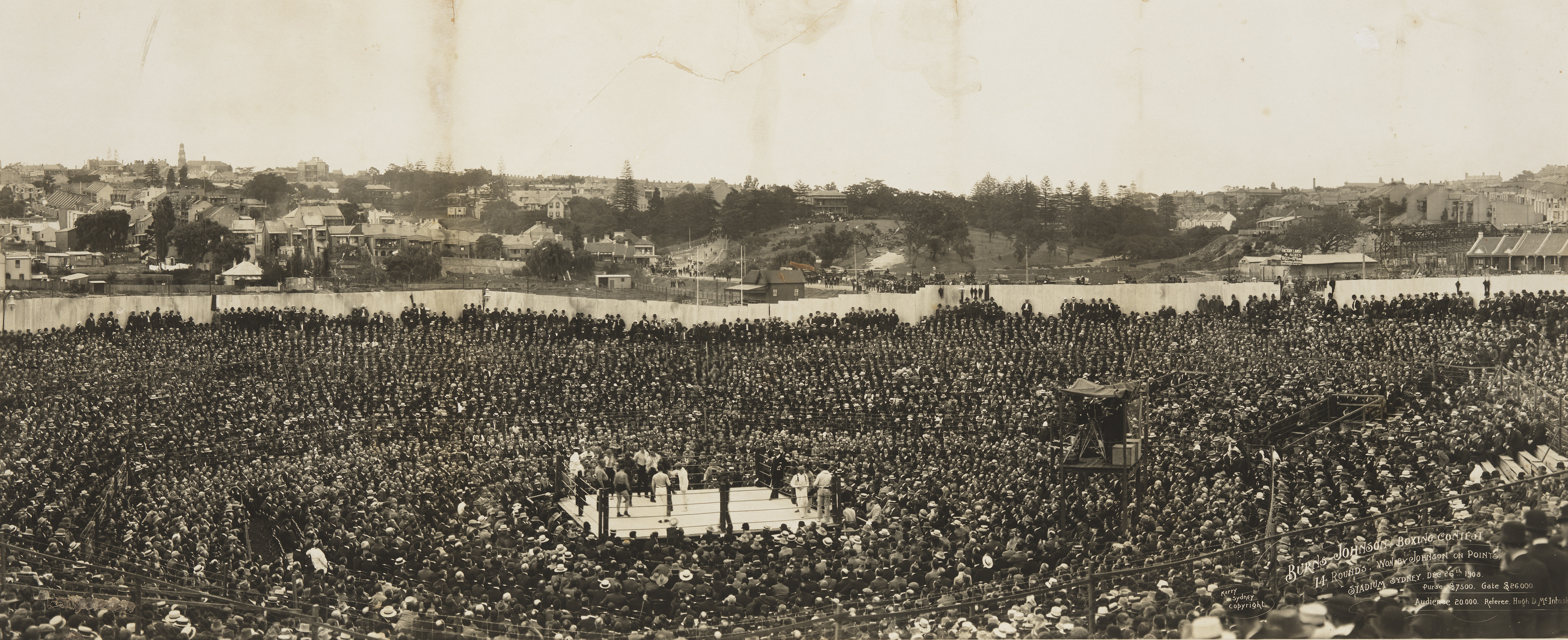
The Burns-Johnson fight at the open-air Sydney Stadium in 1908

The Sydney Stadium also known as the Rushcutters Bay Stadium was a sporting and entertainment venue in Sydney, which formerly stood on the corner of New South Head Road and Neild Avenue, Rushcutters Bay. Built in 1908, it was demolished in 1970 to make way for the construction of the Eastern Suburbs Railway.

== History ==
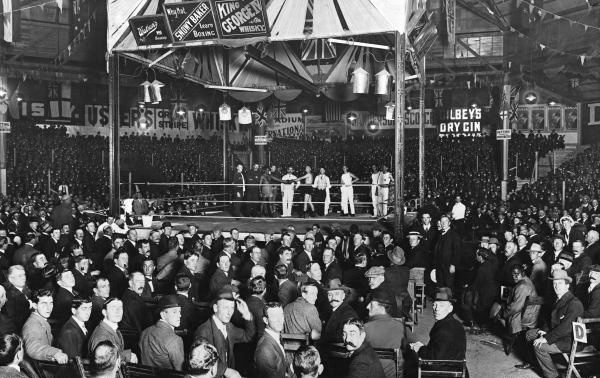
Dave Smith v Jerry Jerome at Sydney Stadium in April 1913

Footage of a professional wrestling match between Fred Atkins and Laverne Baxter at the Stadium in 1947

Sydney Stadium was built in 1908 on the site of a former Chinese market garden that was leased by boxing promoter Hugh Donald Macintosh as a venue for sporting events.

Macintosh originally built a temporary open-air stadium to promote a World heavyweight boxing championship title fight between Canadian world heavyweight champion Tommy Burns and Australian champion Bill "Boshter" Squires on 24 August 1908, which Burns won by a knockout in the 13th Round. It also hosted the biggest sporting event in Australia's history up till then, where over 20,000 crammed in the stadium on 26 December 1908 to see Tommy Burns fight the African-American Jack Johnson. This fight captivated the world because it was the first time that a black man fought for the World Heavyweight Boxing Championship, with Johnson winning to take the title.

In 1912 an octagonal structure, with a roof, was built to a design by Thomas Pollard Sampson. The new venue had raked wooden seats facing the central stage and could accommodate as many as 12,000 people. It was mainly used as a venue for boxing matches until the mid-1900s.

It held the boxing events and westling events at the 1938 British Empire Games.

== The Old Tin Shed ==
From 1954 onwards and through the 1960s, the stadium was frequently used to host concerts by visiting overseas performers – notably the groundbreaking "The Big Show" package tours promoted by expatriate American entrepreneur Lee Gordon – as it was the only large-capacity indoor venue in Sydney at that time. It colloquially became known by performers as "The Old Tin Shed" and was so big that American star Bob Hope purportedly said it was "like Texas with a roof on it".

The stadium hosted many major Australian, New Zealand, British and United States stars.

List of performers
Little Richard
Ella Fitzgerald
Buddy Rich
Artie Shaw
Johnnie Ray
Judy Garland
Frank Sinatra
Cliff Richard
Chuck Berry
Bobby Darin
The Beach Boys
Gerry and the Pacemakers
Peter, Paul and Mary
The Beatles
Bob Dylan
The Who
Johnny Devlin
Johnny O'Keefe
Col Joye and the Joy Boys.

Sydney Stadium was demolished in 1970 to make way for the construction of the Eastern Suburbs Railway. The location of the former site is commemorated by a plaque at the edge of the Weigall sporting field, the sports fields of Sydney Grammar and the Sydney Grammar Edgecliff Preparatory School.

== Exhibition ==
The Museum of Sydney held a major exhibition about the history of the Sydney Stadium. The exhibition started on 22 September 2012 and finished on 10 March 2013. It looked at the origins of the Stadium as well as the fights, performers, wrestling, fans and Roller derby among other topics.
