= Samuel Burmister =

Estonian professional wrestler

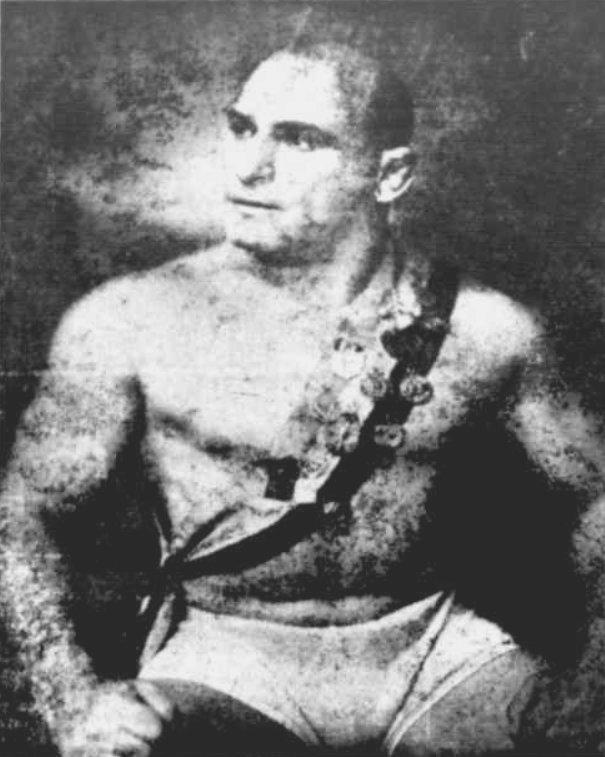
- Burmister, c. 1936

Personal information
- Born: Salomon Burmistrovich; 5 January 1897 Pärnu, Estonia
- Died: October 4, 1962 (aged 65) Brisbane, Australia

Professional wrestling career

Samuel (Sam) Burmister (1897–1962) was a professional wrestler from Estonia. He was also a trainer of wrestlers, and performed in vaudeville and sideshows as a strongman.

== Early life ==
Burmister was born in Pärnu, Estonia on 5 January 1897 to a Jewish family. Sam's obituary writer claimed he participated in the 1912 Olympics for Russia and served as a pilot in the Imperial Russian Air Force in World War I. The writer confused Sam with August Kippasto, Russia's Estonian lightweight wrestling representative at the 1912 Olympic Games, who later migrated to Australia and wrestled professionally. Sam stated he served with the 432nd Company of the 180th Division of the Russian infantry during World War I. As the situation in Russia worsened for Jews after the war, Burmister left Russia on a world tour across Asia and the Pacific and America. His tour took him to Australia in 1925, and found the local wrestling scene so receptive that he decided to return permanently. Burmister emigrated to Brisbane in 1937.

== Wrestling career ==
Burmister had an active career in professional wrestling from 1925 to 1934, including winning the 1929 Australian Heavyweight title. He was also World Jewish Wrestling Champion several times. The press described him as "a low-set, bull-necked, heavily torsoed fellow", and he was well-known and popular with audiences for his "vigorous methods"

In addition to his professional wrestling career, Burmister was also a vaudeville performer and sideshow strongman, under the stage name "The Modern Samson". Anecdotally, one of the highlights of his routine included driving nails into a pine board with his fists and allowing a motor car to be driven across his chest. He also had a small cameo role in the 1925 Australian film "Those Terrible Twins" Burmister switched from competitor to trainer in the late 1940s, training Australian rugby league and rugby union star Bob McMaster when the latter made his foray into professional wrestling.

== Death ==
He died unexpectedly on 4 October 1962 in Brisbane, and is buried in the Jewish section of the Toowong Cemetery, Brisbane.

== Championships and accomplishments ==
- Professional wrestling
  - Australian Catch-as-Catch-Can Championship (1 time)
  - Western Australian Heavyweight Championship (1 time)
