= Clarence Weber =

Australian wrestler

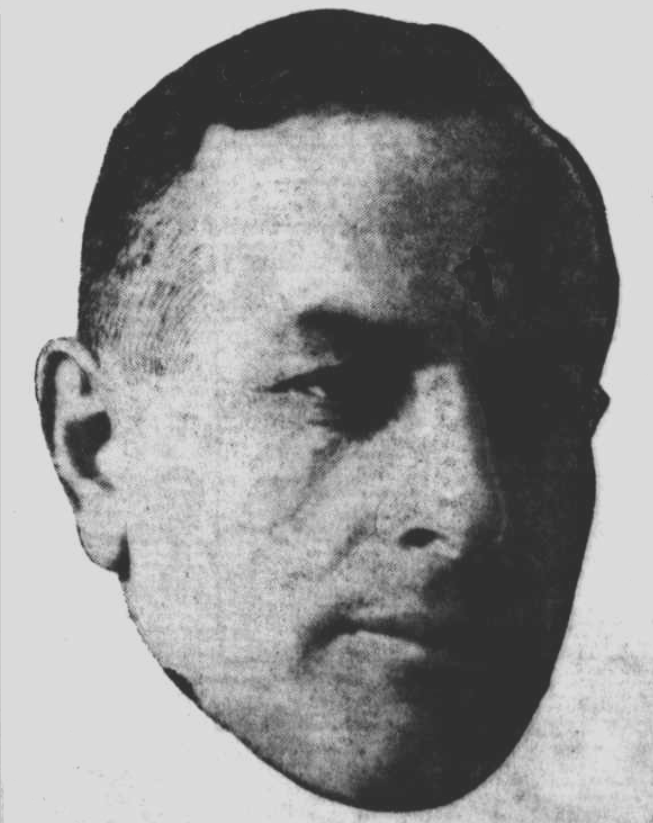

Personal information
- Born: Clarence Alfred Weber; 27 March 1882 Brighton, Melbourne, Australia
- Died: 20 November 1930 (aged 48) Mont Albert, Melbourne, Australia

Professional wrestling career
- Ring name: Clarence Weber
- Billed from: Melbourne, Australia

Clarence Alfred Weber (27 March 1882 – 20 November 1930) was an Australian athlete, wrestler and physical culturalist.

== Career ==
Weber opened a health and strength college in Flinders Street, Melbourne with partner John Rice.

He took up wrestling in 1904, defeating Buttan Singh for the Australian Heavyweight Championship in November 1906. He won the Australian title again in September 1911, and retired in 1913. His return to wrestling in 1923 was less successful. In 1925, Ike Robin defeated Clarence Weber in a Best 2 out of 3 Falls match for the NWA Australasian Heavyweight Championship in Melbourne. Upon returning to Napier, he was apparently awarded a gold medal in recognition of his victory. Robin became so popular in the country that a patented wire-strainer for fencing, the "Ike Grip", was named after him.

Weber's final bout took place in 1926.

== Personal life ==
Weber was the seventh surviving child of Robert Gustaf Frederick Weber and Eliza nee Head.

Weber married Louisa Peck in 1906, and had four daughters and three sons. Louisa died on 19 May 1918.

Weber then married fellow physical culturist Ivy Mitchell (nee Filshie), on 7 March 1919. Ivy had been widowed during World War I and had one son. Together, Clarence and Ivy had one son and two daughters.

== Death ==
Weber collapsed and died on 20 November 1930 while washing his hands before dinner in Victoria Crescent, Mont Albert at the age of 48, the cause of death was a coronary occlusion. His second wife, Ivy, became the second woman to be elected to the Victorian parliament and the first at a general election.

== Championships and accomplishments ==
- Professional boxing
  - Australian Heavyweight Championship
- Professional wrestling
  - Australian Heavyweight Championship (1 time)
  - Australasian Heavyweight Championship (1 time)
