= Acron (disambiguation) =

Acron was an ancient Greek physician. Acron may also refer to:

== People ==
- Acron or Acro, a king of the Caeninenses, whom Romulus slew in battle
- Helenius Acron, 2nd century commentator
- Otto Acron (born 1935), Australian strongman

== Business ==
- Acron Aviation, an American avionics and flight training company
- Acron Group, a Russian mineral fertiliser company

== Places ==
- Acron, Florida, a ghost town in the US

== Science ==
- Prostomium or "acron", the first body segment of Annelid worms
- Acrosome or "acron", the anterior part of a spermatozoon

== See also ==
- Akron (disambiguation)
- Acorn
- Acorn (disambiguation)
