= Basilica Aemilia =

Ancient Roman civic basilica in Rome

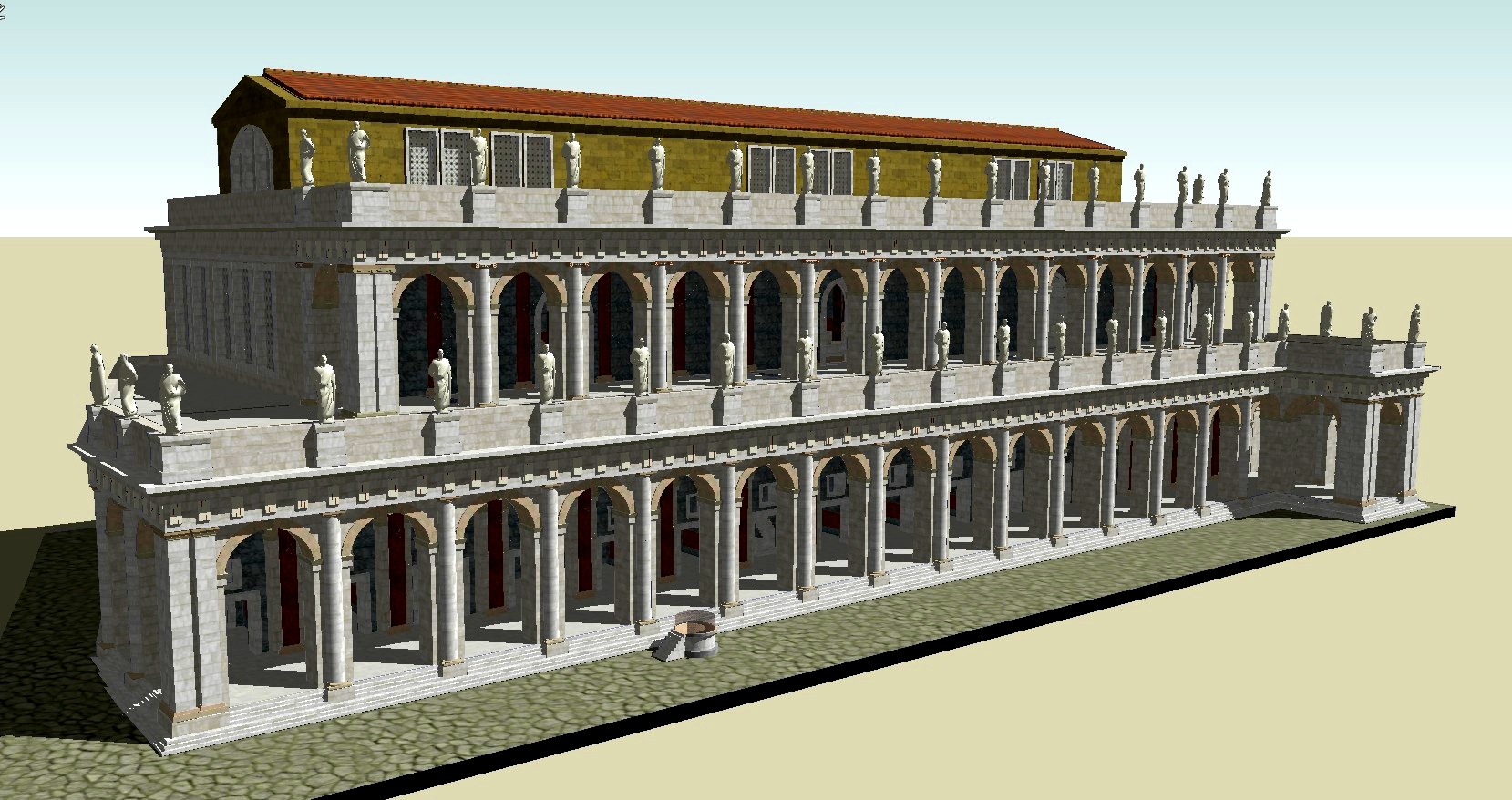
- Computer generated reconstruction of the basilica as it appeared under Augustus

- Shown in ancient Rome
- Click on the map for a fullscreen view
- 41°53′33″N 12°29′10″E
- Type: Basilica
- Location: Regio IV Templum Pacis

History
- Built: 34 BCE
- Built by: Marcus Fulvius Nobilior

The Basilica Aemilia (Italian: Basilica Emilia), or the Basilica Paulli, was a civil basilica in the Roman Forum. Lucius Aemilius Paullus initiated its construction, but the building was completed by his son, Paullus Aemilius Lepidus, in 34 BCE. Under Augustus, it was reconstructed in 22 CE and was described by Pliny as one of the most beautiful examples of Roman architecture. Today, only fragments of the floorplan and colonnade remain, but a sculptural frieze from the basilica's interior was partially reconstructed and is now on display in the cloister of Santa Francesca Romana.

== History ==
=== Pre-existing structures ===
Archaeological and historical studies place the Forum's earliest commercial activity along its central axis, where a series of butcher shops (Latin: tabernae lanienae) occupied a prominent position during the early Republic. These were replaced around 310 BCE by money-changers (Latin: argentariae), a change interpreted as reflecting broader economic diversification and the Forum's growing role in diplomatic affairs during the late fourth century BCE. The central placement of the argentariae has been seen as evidence of the Forum's transformation into a space for financial transactions, political business, and the reception of foreign envoys. A fire in 210 destroyed the stalls, which were subsequently rebuilt as the argentariae novae on the Forum's northern side, in front of the later Basilica Aemilia. The reconstructed shops may have incorporated upper-level galleries (Latin: maeniana) for viewing public spectacles in the square below.

In two plays written in the early second century BCE, Plautus refers to an unnamed basilica adjacent to the tabernae and the near Shrine of Venus Cloacina. Although he does not explicitly identify the structure, some scholars interpret these references as evidence for the construction of an earlier basilica on this site in the years following the fire of 210 BCE, likely between 195 and 191 BCE. Excavations have uncovered tuff foundations made of Monteverde stone, along with remains of a northeast-facing portico that probably fronted the Forum Piscarium.

=== Basilica Fulvia ===
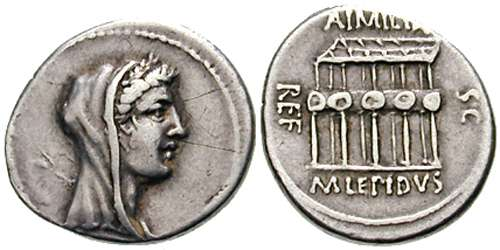
Coin of M. Aemilius Lepidus showing the Basilica Aemilia decorated with shields.

The Basilica Fulvia, constructed in 179 BCE by consuls Marcus Fulvius Nobilior and Marcus Aemilius Lepidus, laid the architectural and historical groundwork for the later Basilica Aemilia. Built behind the argentariae novae, it was later referred to as the "Basilica Aemilia et Fulvia" by Varro, reflecting continued contributions by the gens Aemilia. Enhancements over the decades included the installation of a water clock in 159 BCE and decorative shields added by another Marcus Aemilius Lepidus in 78 BCE, elements possibly depicted on coins from 61 BCE. Architecturally, the Basilica Fulvia introduced a significant innovation: an enlarged central nave supported by two rows of columns, allowing for an open interior space unlike the dense colonnades of earlier Greek-inspired basilicas. Today, only a portion of its tuff foundations remains visible beneath a canopy on the site's northwest side.

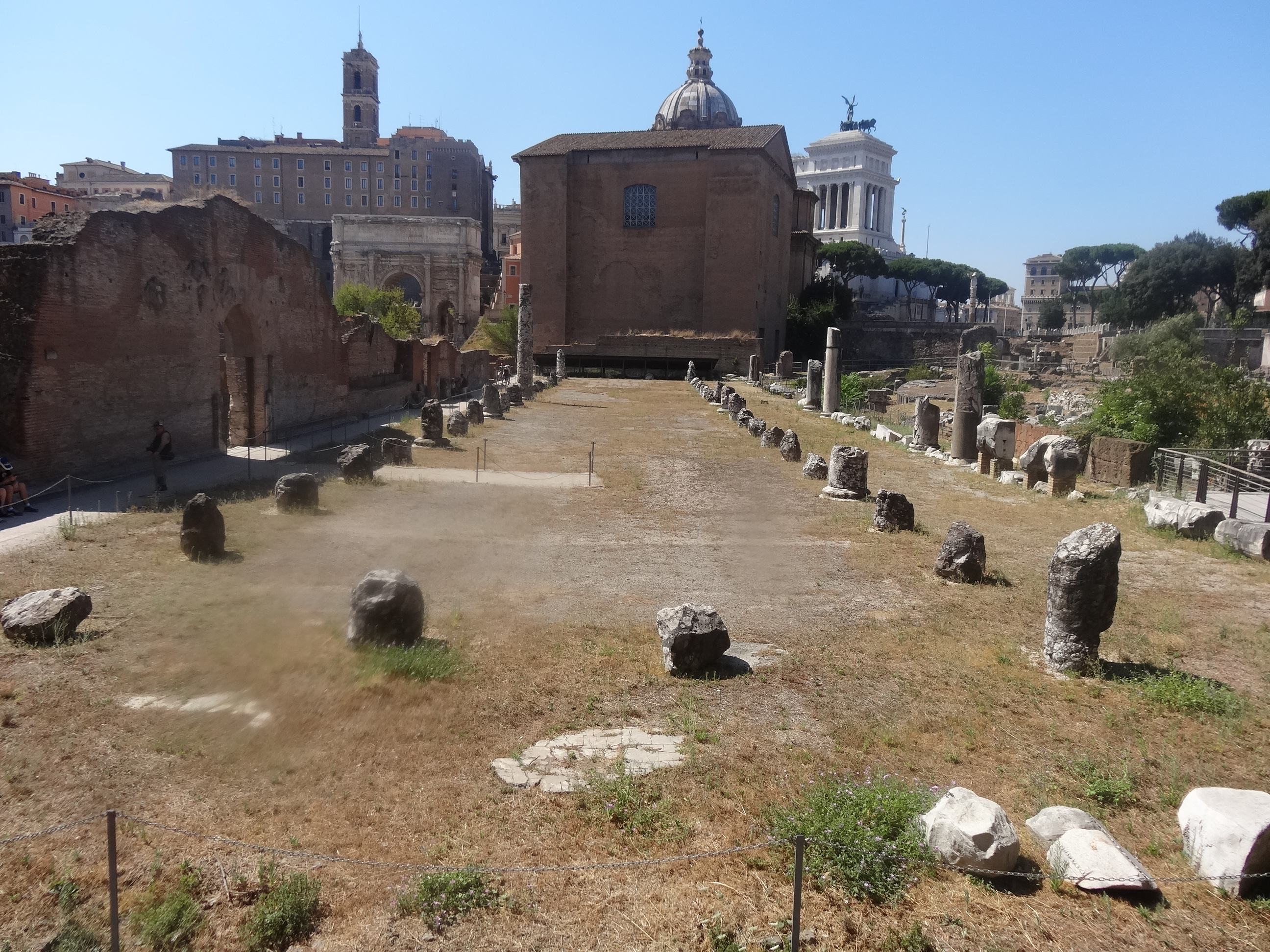
Basilica Aemilia, as seen today.

=== Basilica Aemilia/Paulli ===
Construction of a new basilica on the site began around 55 BCE under censor Lucius Aemilius Paullus, replacing the earlier basilica Fulvia and incorporating its interior columns. By 50 BCE, Julius Caesar purportedly contributed substantial funds towards the building's embellishment, a gesture that has been linked to his need for the Paullus family's allyship during his political fight with Pompey. The project was completed by 34 BCE by Paullus's son, Paullus Aemilius Lepidus. A fire in 14 BCE caused extensive damage, prompting Augustus to oversee a full reconstruction and dedicate the structure to the gens Aemilis. In 2 BCE, a monumental portico above the tabernae was added in honor of Gaius and Lucius Caesar. Augustus' contributions to the basilica occurred at a time when the princeps began to exert absolute control over all construction in the Roman Forum, and it is clear that Augustus prioritized projects that had historical associations with Julius Caesar.

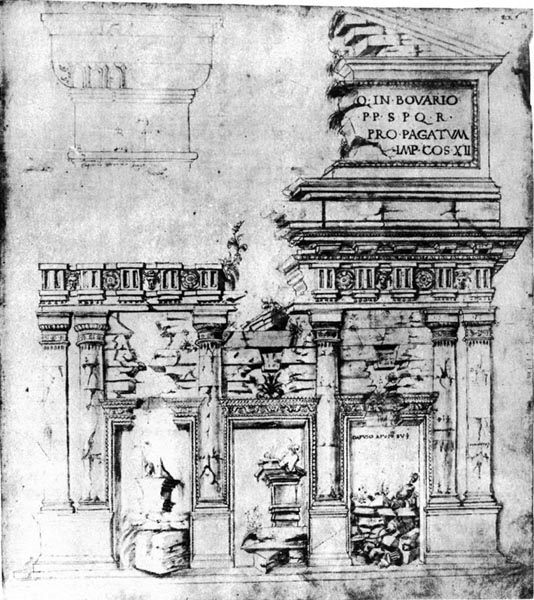
Drawing of the remains of the Basilica Aemilia, by Giuliano da Sangallo, 1480.

The Basilica Aemilia stood for nearly 400 years in the Roman Forum, undergoing a restoration in 22 CE under the direction of the senator Marcus Aemilius Lepidus. A portion of the basilica's floorplan appears on a small fragment of the Forma Urbis Romae, showing the tabernae along the southwest side and an interior colonnade with the inscription "[B]ASILIC[A]." The basilica was ultimately destroyed during the sack of Rome in 410 CE by Alaric I and his Visigoth army, as evidenced by bronze coins burned into the pavement that remain visible on the site today. While the tabernae remained in use until the 6th century, the site itself fell into disrepair throughout the early Middle Ages. In 847, an earthquake destroyed what little remained of the structure. During the Renaissance, architects reused the basilica's building materials as spolia, notably at the Palazzo Torlonia. A drawing by Giuliano da Sangallo from 1480 depicts the Basilica Aemilia in a ruinous state.

Giacomo Boni was the first archaeologist to excavate the site from 1898 to 1912, uncovering the tabernae underneath the portico along the Via Sacra. Alfonso Bartoli continued excavations from 1922 to 1940, clearing the site to reveal the entire basilica hall while working in tandem with the excavation teams at the Temple of Peace. In 1939, the Roman city government declared the full "liberation" of the basilica. Pietro Romanelli and Gianfilippo Carettoni dug deeper and found evidence of the older foundations of the Basilica Fulvia underneath the imperial marble floor of the Augustan era. Heinrich Bauer led a survey of the site in the early 1970s, but his untimely death left much of his material unpublished until 2016 with the publication of Klaus Freyberger and Christine Etel's study that synthesized Bauer's meticulous reconstruction with the latest discoveries on the site.

== Description ==
=== Location ===
The Basilica Aemilia is located on the northeast edge of the Roman Forum, running parallel to the Via Sacra. It is flanked on either side by the Temple of Antoninus and Faustina, and the Curia Julia, putting it at the heart of civic, economic, and religious activity in the city of Rome. The Cloaca Maxima runs underneath the basilica, as evidenced by the presence of the nearby Shrine of Venus Cloaca, located in front of the tabernae facing the Forum. In the late first century CE, the construction of the Temple of Peace and the Forum of Nerva to the north of the basilica rendered the southern façade facing the Via Sacra and Forum the most visible.

=== Exterior ===
The basilica stood on a tufa podium with a continuous marble staircase on three sides, granting access from the Forum to the southwest-facing porticus. Its façade featured engaged Doric columns with fluted shafts, Attic bases, and capitals decorated with egg-and-dart molding. Each bay of the entablature included five triglyphs, four metopes alternating between bucrania and decorative shields, and a richly carved cornice with coffered soffits and projecting modillions. All three façades were topped with a Doric entablature and attic, and decorated bases supported colossal statues of Parthian prisoners above the half-columns. These figures, possibly numbering at least eighteen, were carved from Pavonazzo marble and giallo antico, with Pentelic marble heads. Between each statue were niches intended for imagines clipeatae, likely recalling earlier commemorative portraits installed by Marcus Aemilius Lepidus in 78 BCE.

A fragmentary pediment shown in the drawing by Giuliano da Sangello at the west end suggests that the basilica featured a wooden gable roof at its east and west end. Additional decorative and architectural elements were concentrated along the building's northern and southern flanks. The outermost colonnade, forming a shallow porch, was constructed with shafts of Cipollino marble, but was later walled off in the late 1st century CE, due to the nearly Temple of Peace and Forum of Nerva.

=== Interior ===
Several passageways between the shops lining the southern end of the basilica granted access to the central hall. The expansive interior, nearly 100 meters long and 30 meters wide, was entirely clad in marble, with richly colored marble flooring and African marble columns in both the Ionic and Corinthian orders. It consisted of a central nave surrounded by a single aisle, with an additional aisle on the northern end.

A series of reliefs along lower entablature depicted key episodes from the life of Romulus and the founding of Rome. The most securely identified scenes include Romulus and Remus departing Alba Longa, the construction of Rome's walls, the rape of the Sabine women, Romulus's combat with Acron, and the punishment of Tarpeia. Each episode was visually paired with a corresponding Roman festival, such as the Parilia, the Consualia, and the Matronalia, highlighting Romulus not only as a political leader but also as the founder of Rome's religious calendar. This strong association between Romulus and Roman religion formed part of a broader ideological program initiated by Julius Caesar and continued by Augustus, aiming to present Romulus as the ideal monarch. In doing so, they reinforced the image of the princeps during Rome's transition from Republic to Empire. Accordingly, most scholars date the frieze to the basilica's construction under the direction of Lucius Aemilius Paullus and his son Paullus Aemilius Lepidus, between 43 and 34 BCE.

Fragments from the frieze of the Basilica Aemilia, Roman Forum Museum, Rome.

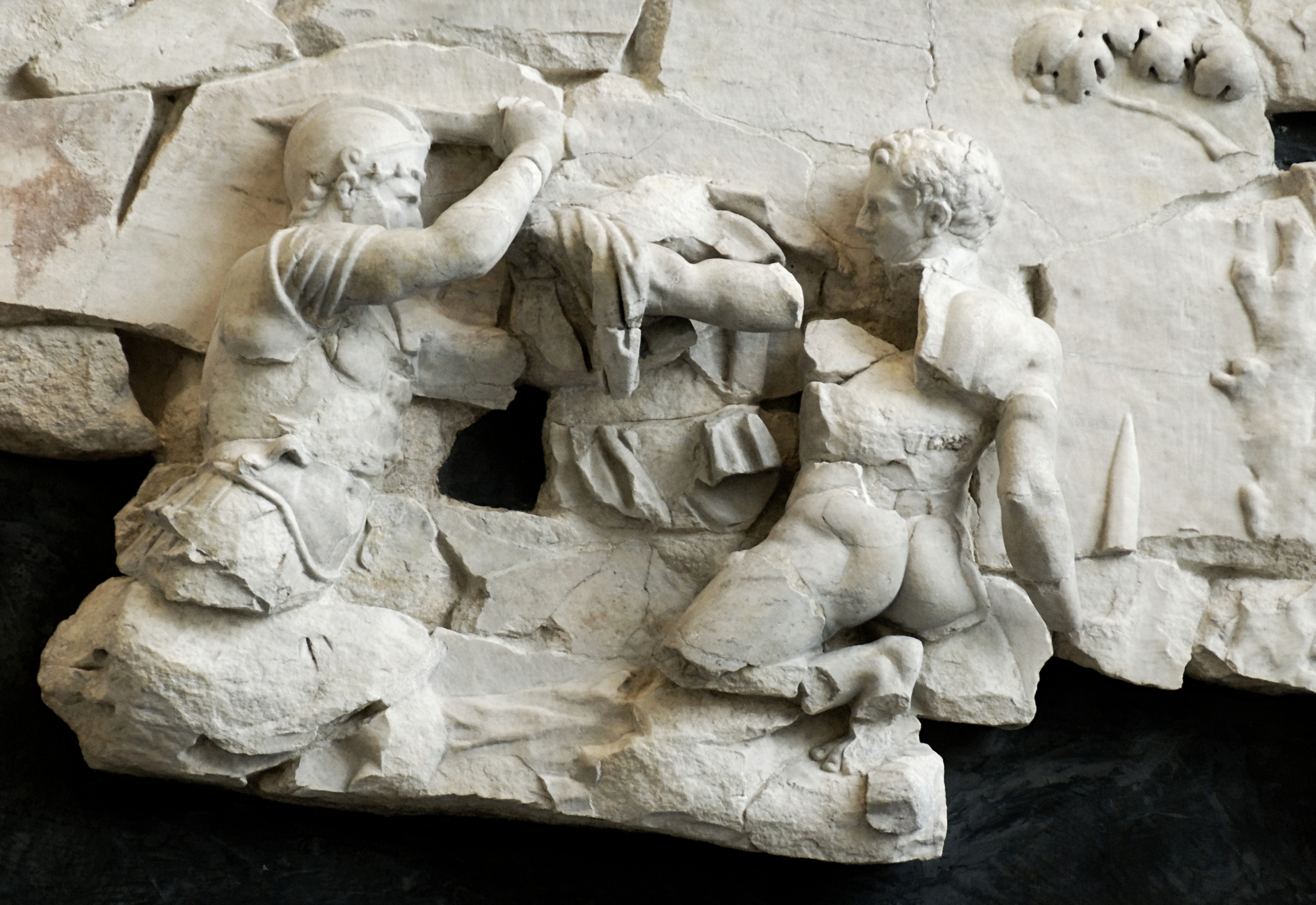
Duel between Romulus and Acron.

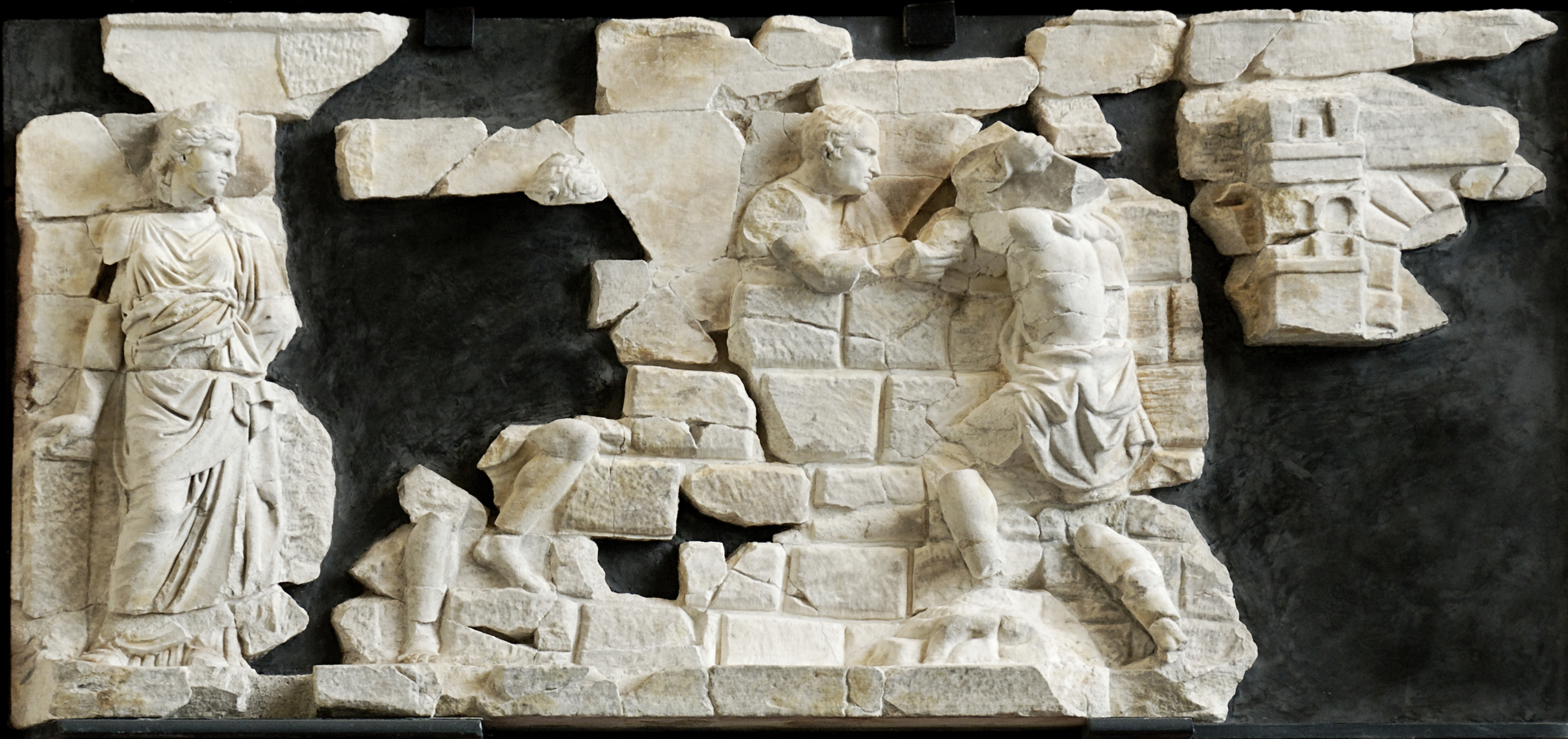
Building Rome's fortification walls

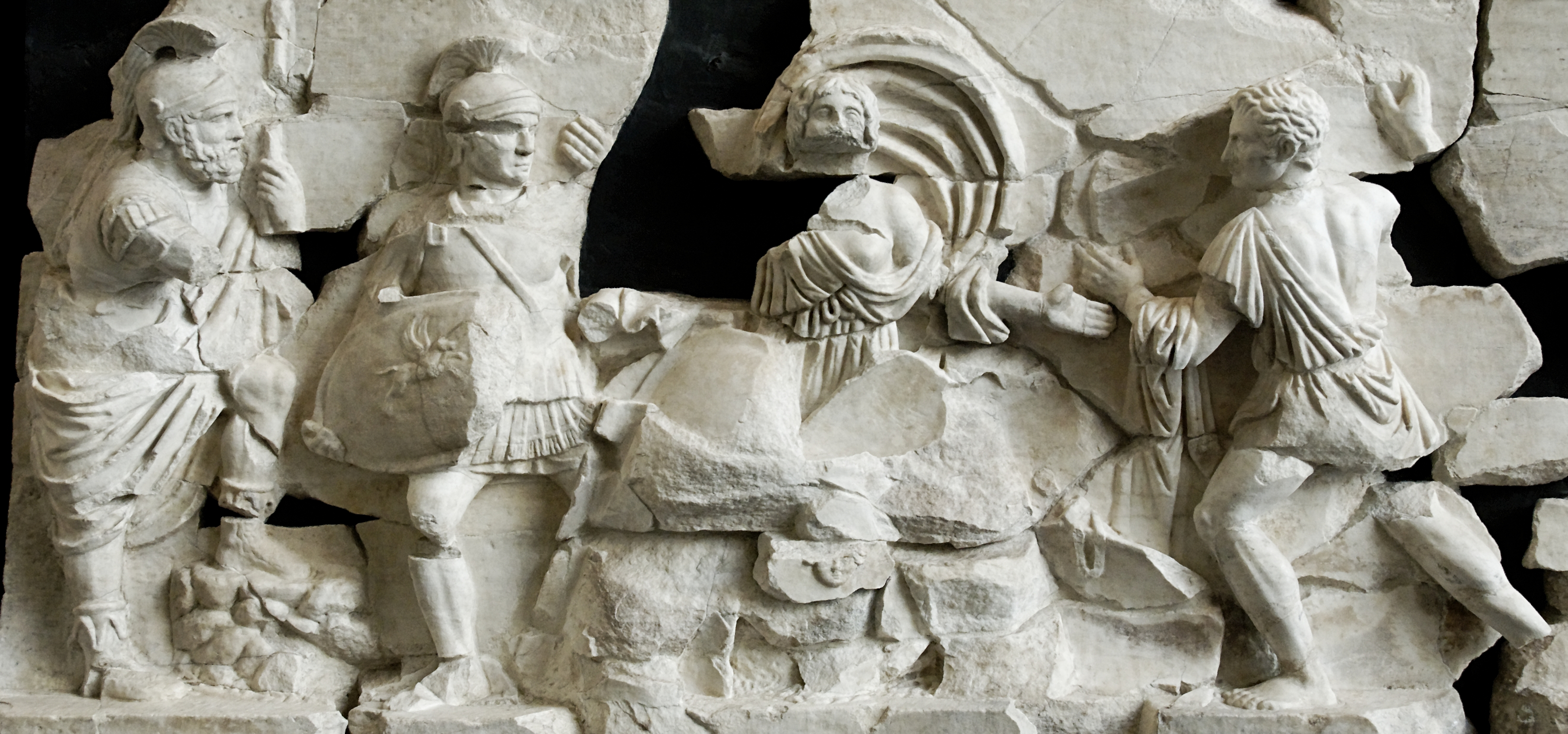
Punishment of Tarpeia

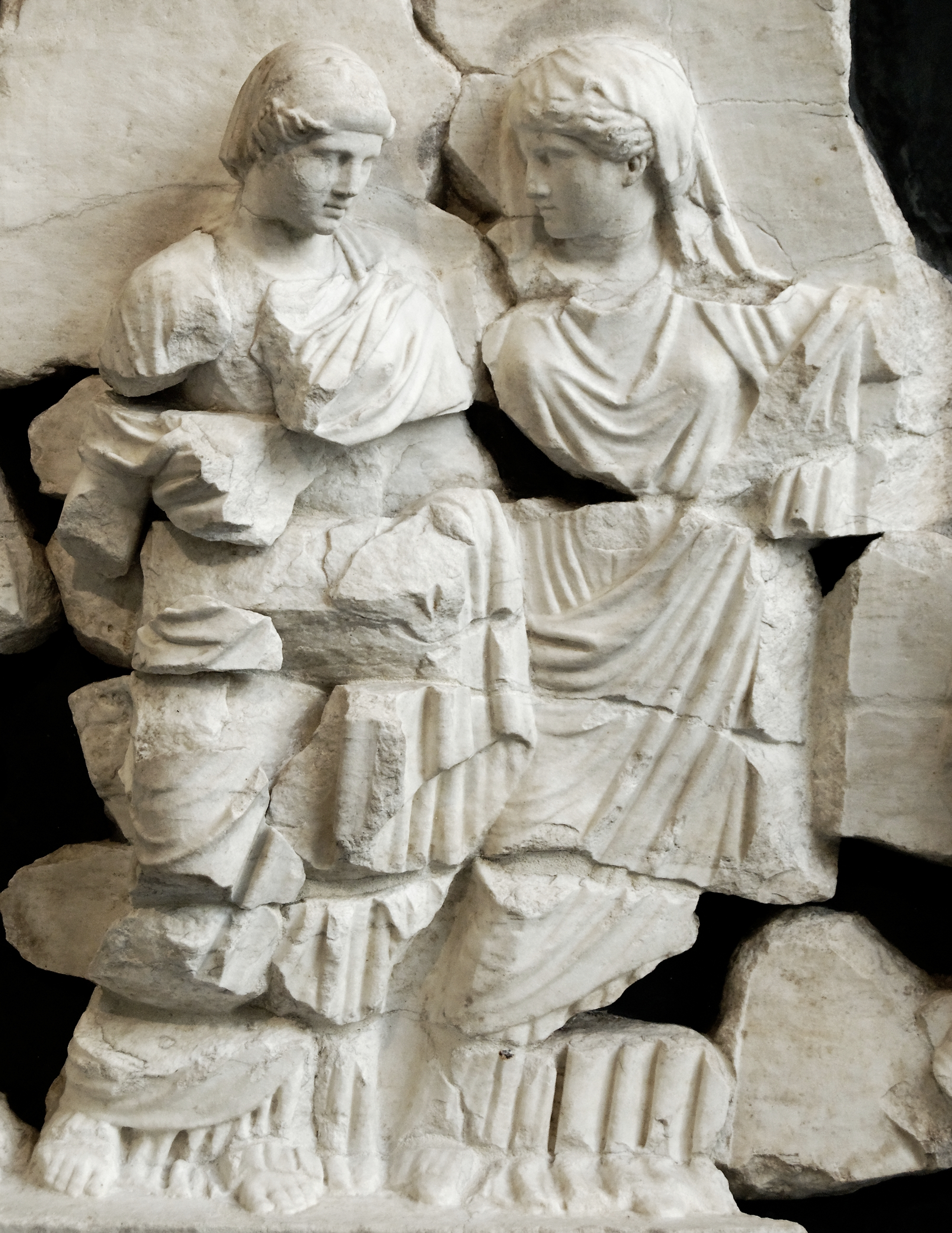
Wedding scene

=== Function ===
Like many Roman basilicas, the Basilica Aemilia may have been used as a civil court or as a place to conduct business. The presence of the shops along the southern end of the building suggests that the basilica served primarily as a place of commercial activity. Along with the bronze coin burned into the structure during the sack of Rome in 410, archaeologists have uncovered bolts with nail holes, and metal fittings in the debris that may have come from wooden counters placed between the interior columns where shopkeepers or bankers may have stocked their most costly items. Furthermore, markings in the pavement indicate that certain areas of the basilica were used for gambling.

== See also ==
- Basilica Julia – nearby Augustan-era basilica
- Basilica of Maxentius – Late Antique basilica
