= Akron (disambiguation) =

Akron is a city in the U.S. state of Ohio.

The name is adapted from the Greek word ἄκρον (ákron), meaning summit or high point.

Akron may also refer to:

== Aviation ==
- USS Akron, a rigid airship of the United States Navy
- Akron (1911 airship), a semirigid airship that exploded in 1912

== Entertainment ==
- Akron (film), a 2015 independent, LGBT-themed film, directed by Brian O'Donnell
- Akron / Family, a folk-influenced experimental rock band

== Places ==
=== Canada ===
- Akron, Ontario

=== United States ===
- Akron, Alabama
- Akron, Colorado
- Akron, Indiana
- Akron, Iowa
- Akron, Kansas
- Akron, Michigan
- Akron, Missouri
- Akron, Nebraska
- Akron, New York
- Akron, Ohio
- Akron, Pennsylvania
- Akron, West Virginia
- Akron Township, Illinois
- Akron Township, Michigan
- Akron Township, Big Stone County, Minnesota
- Akron Township, Wilkin County, Minnesota

== Other uses ==
- University of Akron, in Ohio
- Akron and Barberton Belt Railroad
- Akron Plan, an architectural plan for church buildings in the late 19th and early 20th century
- Acron Group, sometimes spelled Akron Group, a Russian chemical company
- Independence Akron, a German paraglider design
- The Akron (1948–1985), a Southern California-based imported goods and home decorating retail chain
- Akron Stadium, a football stadium in Guadalajara, Mexico
- FC Akron Tolyatti, a Russian professional football club based in Tolyatti

== See also ==
- Acron (disambiguation)
- Akron Airport (disambiguation)
