= Roman food =

Roman food may refer to:

- Ancient Roman cuisine
- Food and dining in the Roman Empire
- Roman cuisine
