= Acro =

Acro or ACRO may refer to:

== Sports ==
- Acro dance, a dance style combining classical dance technique and acrobatics
- Acroyoga, a physical practice combining yoga and acrobatics

== Organizations ==
- Acro Sport, an aircraft manufacturer
- G103a Twin II Acro, a sailplane manufactured by Grob Aircraft
- ACPO Criminal Records Office, an ancillary body of the British Association of Chief Police Officers

== People ==
- Helenius Acron or Acro, an ancient Roman writer

== See also ==
- Acron (disambiguation)
