= Ekron (disambiguation) =

Ekron may refer to:

- Ekron, a city in Canaan, famous for its domination by the Philistines
- Ekron, Kentucky, in the United States
- The former name of Mazkeret Batya, Israel
- Ekron (comics), a character in the works of DC Comics

== See also ==
- Akron (disambiguation)
