= Cena =

Main meal in Ancient Roman culture

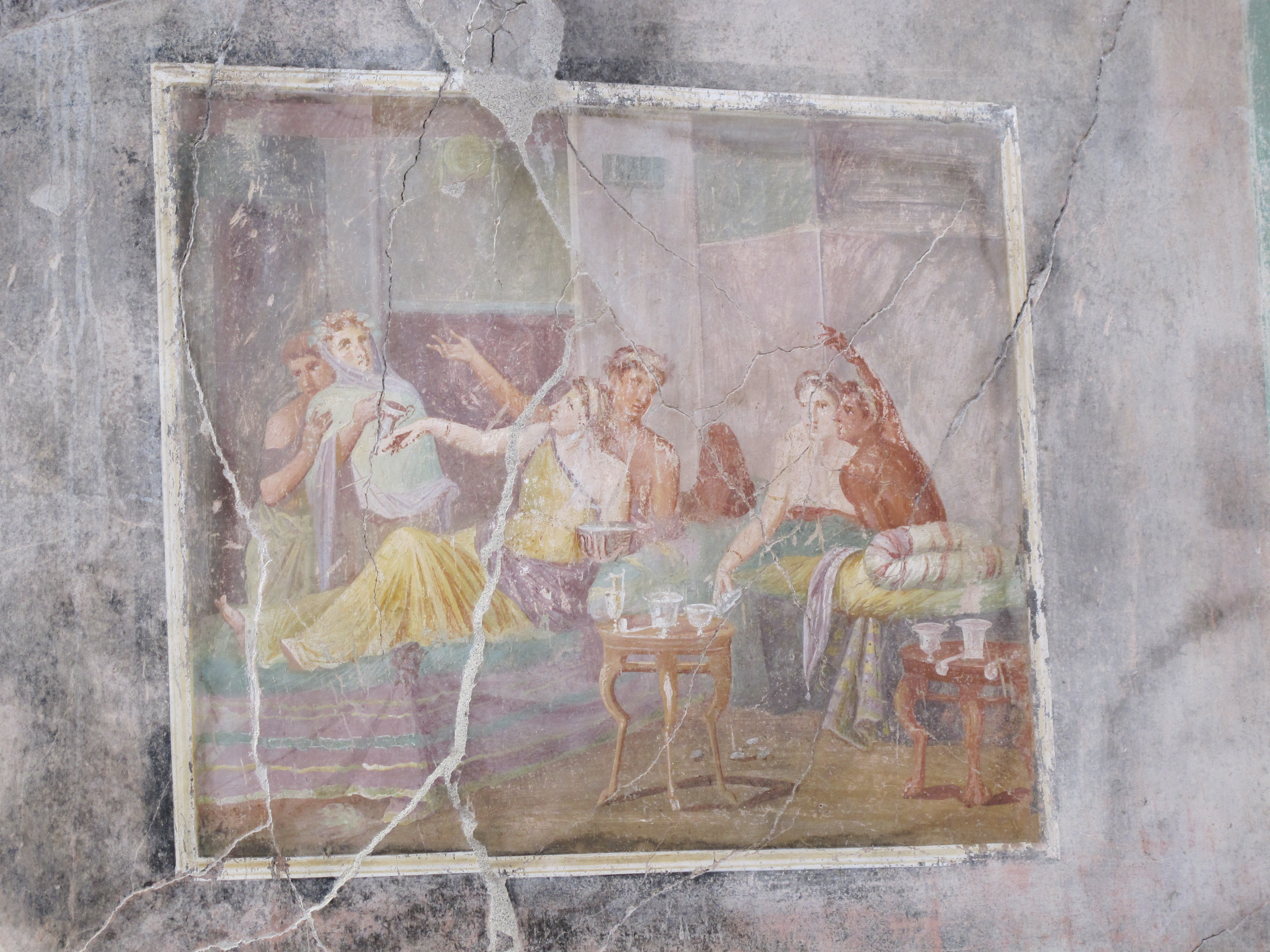
Banqueting scene from the House of the Chaste Lovers, Pompeii, IX.12.6

In Ancient Roman culture, cena or coena was the main meal of the day. The grammarian, Sextus Pompeius Festus, preserved in his De verborum significatione that in earlier times, cena was held midday but later began to be held in evenings, with prandium replacing the noon meal. Cena would occur after work was completed for the day and was a focal point of social life, along with the public baths, the frequenting of which often preceded the meal. Seating during dinner was in the triclinium, three couches for reclining arranged as three sides of a square, with a small table for food in the middle of all these, although masonry dining areas have been found in Pompeian gardens for out of doors dining during warmer weather. Whether inside or out, the couches would have been cushioned by mattresses and pillows while the diners reclined on their elbows. Ancient Romans believed that having more than one meal per day was unhealthy.

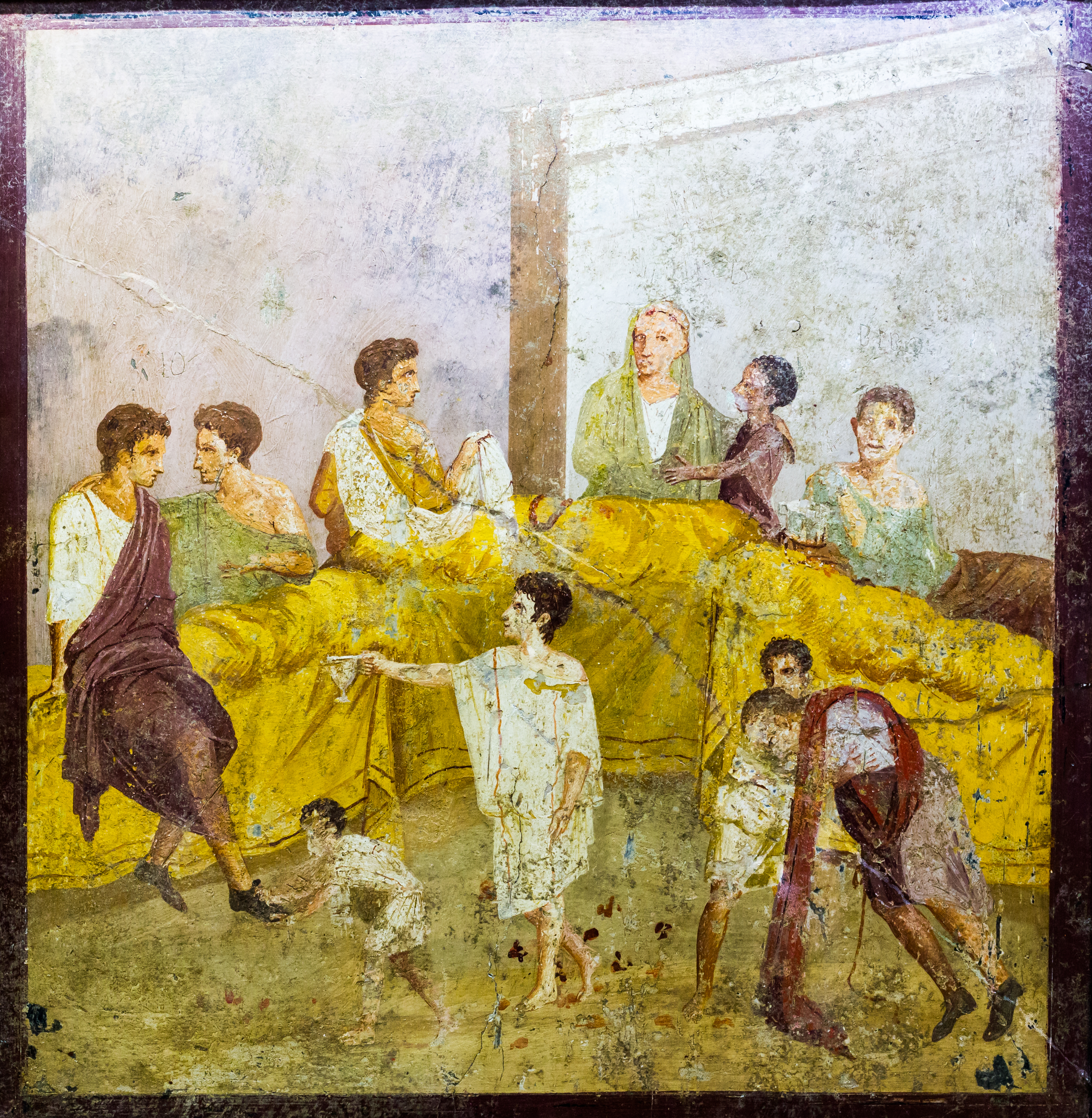
Banquet Fresco from the House of the Triclinium, Pompeii, V.2.4

While most often cena would be a simple affair, for wealthier Romans on special occasions it could be an elaborate banquet as described by Martial, Pliny, and Petronius. During these cenae, the host could show off their wealth and impress their guests, although some were prone to creating class distinctions between guests. Some of the surviving descriptions are prone to exaggeration such as the banquets of the emperor's written about in the Lives of the Twelve Caesars and the Lives of the Later Caesars. The 3rd century C.E. author, Athenaeus organizes his book Deipnosophists as a series of conversations around the order of a dinner party and the meals served.

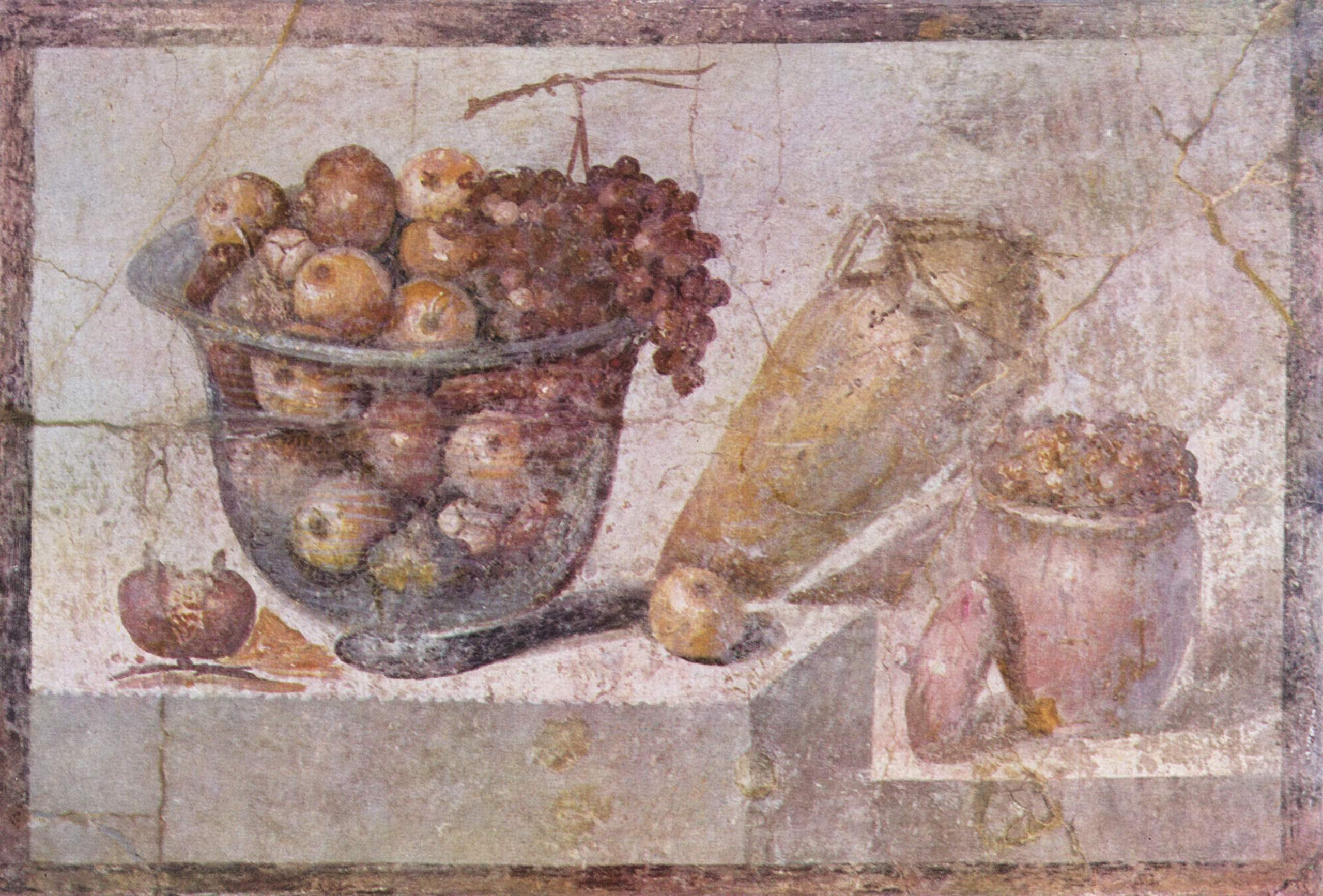
Still life from Pompeii showing Grapes and Apples

The cena traditionally consisted of three parts. The appetizer course (gustatio) often included eggs, olives, and honeyed wine, but could include clams and snails as found in nearby refuse piles by some outdoor Pompeian Triclina. Other dishes included in the gustatio would come from the host's garden such as lettuce, leeks, mallows, mint, and arugula or fish from the coast such as tuna or anchovies. The second, main course often included the main meat dish, like a roasted pig, or for variety sheep or goats alongside vegetables like beans or cabbage. Throughout the Roman world, pork was the preferred meat dish in various forms, although sausage and blood pudding were also common. The third and final course included desserts such as fruits or nuts. All courses would be served with wine and bread.

Only the very wealthy would consume exotic dishes such as giraffes, ostrich, lions, and peacocks. Some of the dishes would be elaborately sauced and dressed, with many enslaved cooks drawing inspiration from M. Gavius Apicius, a famous chef from the early imperial period. Many of these enslaved cooks would also be skilled at disguising dishes as things they are not, adding to the pageantry of the more elaborate of these events which could include musicians, singers, acrobats, poets, and dancers in addition to the displays of food service. Many, but not all of the entertainers were enslaved persons. Some meals would be a time for storytelling and philosophical discussions between the guests, often being a time for them to hear news from around the empire.

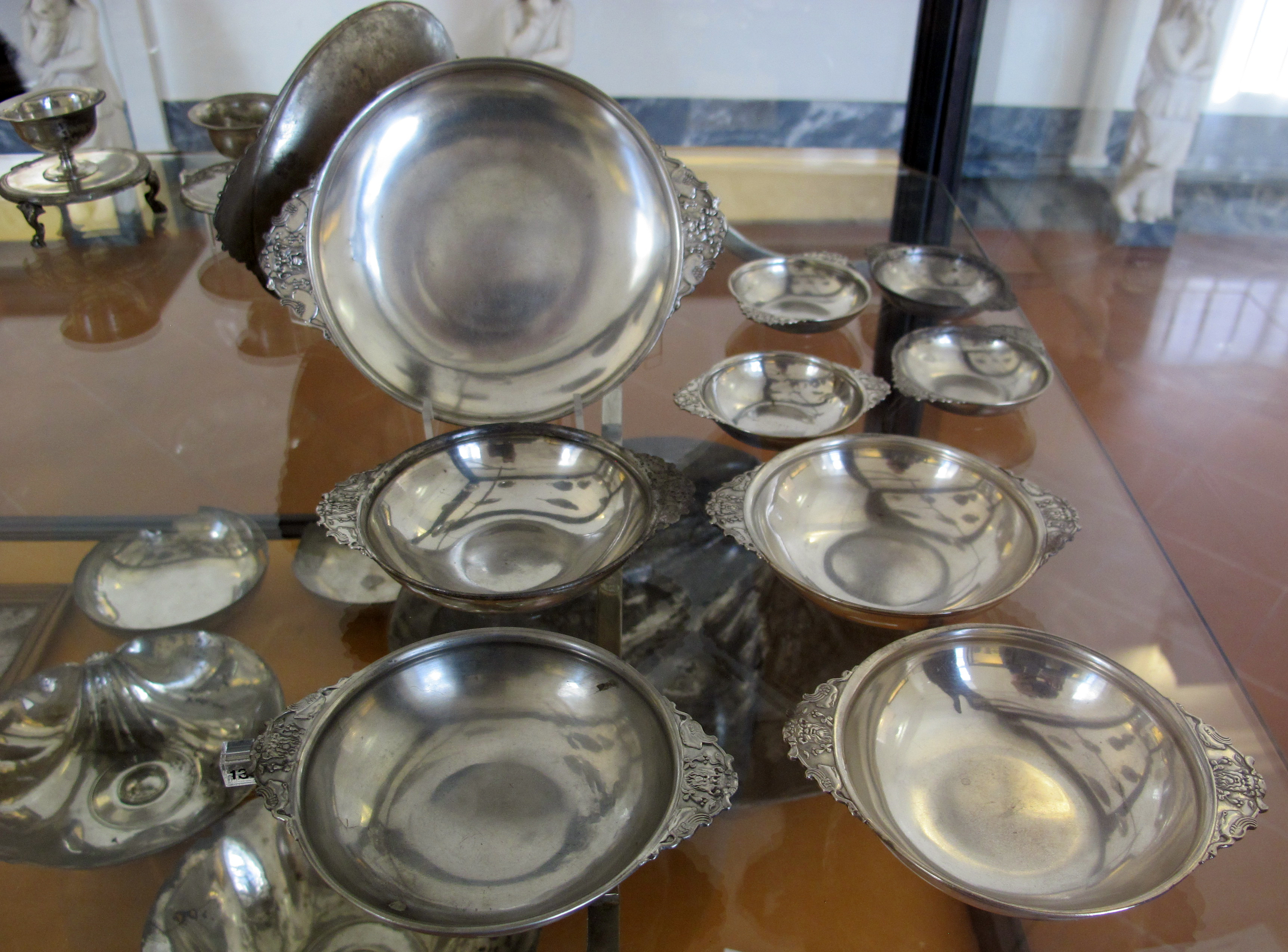
Part of the Silver Hoard from the House of Menander

The courses of the more elaborate cena would have been served on silverware, as evidenced by the hoards found at Boscoreale and the House of Menander, or if that was unaffordable then bronze or glass. The cena of a farmer would be served on simple wood or terracotta dishes.

== See also ==
- Cuisine of ancient Rome
- Food and dining in the Roman Empire
- Ancient Rome and wine
