= Otto Acron =

Australian strongman (born 1935)

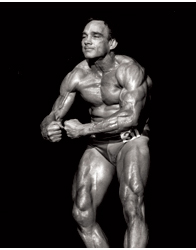
- Born: Alexander James Alsop; 12 May 1935 (age 91); Sydney, Australia
- Occupations: Circus strongman, Wrestler, modern strongman

Otto Acron (born 12 May 1935) is an Australian strongman.

== Early life ==
Otto Acron was born 12 May 1935 as Alexander James Alsop in Sydney, Australia to Lilly Elizabeth and James Gess Alsop. He had two brothers, Ken his older and Ian his younger brother. His father worked on the railways as a boilermaker. Otto recalls him being a "very big man, not all muscle, but with very impressive big arms".

Otto liked to read Superman and Captain Marvel comics and was interested in the feats of strongmen and wrestlers from an early age. When he was 14 he suffered a severe injury during a friendly boxing match which damaged his brain and took years to heal. He became determined during recovery to train himself to be able to perform extraordinary physical feats.

== Career as a circus strongman ==
In 1955 he worked as a circus strongman on fairgrounds throughout New South Wales bending iron bars, breaking chains, getting run over by cars. He also worked in Roy Bell's, Jimmy Sharman's and Les McNabb's boxing tents taking on all comers.

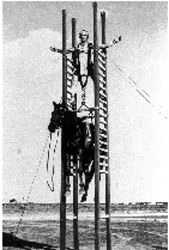
Otto Acron carrying a horse up the ladders

In 1959 he approached Bullens Circus to work as a strongman. To get the job he had to carry a 1,000 lb (450 kg) horse up a 14 ft (4.3 m) ladder (a feat performed earlier by South African strongman William Pagel). This became one of his signature stunts, performed over 2,000 times in his career. He also became known for holding at bay two lorries, one with each arm and for having two elephants attempting to move him from the centre of the ring.

In 1961 he joined Boswell Brother's Circus in South Africa. In December 1962 he wrestled for Dale Martin Promotions, wrestling all over England. In the summer of 1962 he worked for Circus Arnardo in Norway and returned to England, where he wrestled during the winter season. In the summer of 1963 he went and worked for Circus Toni Boltini in the Netherlands. He was married there and continued working in the Netherlands, Belgium, and Germany.

== Career as a modern strongman ==
In August 1971 Otto Acron took on two aeroplanes in a tug of war at Rotterdam Airport. This was the first time he had performed this stunt that he would later perform with increasingly strong planes.

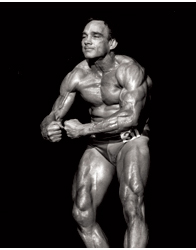
Winning the 1985 Mr. Australia championship

In 1984 he entered many physique competitions, winning the masters: Mr. Sydney, Mr. Australia., Mr. Oceania, Mr. Southern Hemisphere. In 1984 and 1985, he entered power lifting competitions in the masters division, and became state champion and Australian champion for the 82.5 kg class. In 1992 he came seventh in the world power lifting contest.

== Later career ==
In 1995 he left Sydney and took his family to Hervey Bay in Queensland where he started a gym called Otto's Fitness World.

In 2005, at the age of seventy he did 1125 push ups in half an hour to raise money for a young boy who needed a motorised wheel chair.

On 14 November 2000, he was awarded the Australian Sports Medal.
