= Akron Airport (disambiguation) =

Akron Airport may refer to:

- Akron Airport in Akron, New York, United States (FAA: 9G3)
- Akron–Canton Airport serving Akron, Ohio, United States (FAA/IATA: CAK)
- Akron Executive Airport in Akron, Ohio, United States (FAA: AKR, IATA: AKC)
- Colorado Plains Regional Airport in Akron, Colorado, United States (FAA/IATA: AKO)
