= William Pagel =

Strongman and circus proprietor (1878–1948)

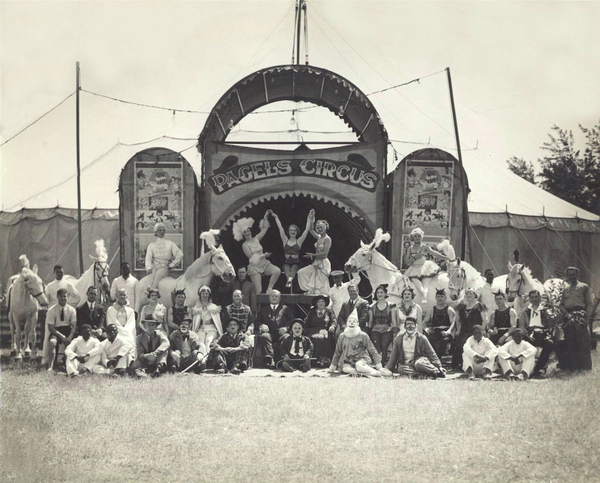

Friedrich Wilhelm August Pagel aka William Pagel (5 February 1878 Plathe, Pomerania, Germany – 13 October 1948 Knysna) was a "strongman" and South African circus proprietor.

== Biography ==
He was the second of eight children raised by Antonia Fraudnich and August Pagel.

Friedrich took after his father physically in having great size and strength. His first working years were spent as a blacksmith, but after qualifying at seventeen, he joined a ship's crew as a stoker.

After extensive travelling, he went ashore at Sydney, Australia, and was employed in various menial occupations. His robust build found him a position as bouncer at a licensed restaurant where he also peeled potatoes and washed dishes.

In 1899 in Tasmania, he met and married Mary Dinsdale (1865–1939), a Yorkshire woman with a keen understanding of financial matters. Under her guidance their fortunes improved, while Pagel's act gained renown.

In 1904, the couple visited Europe, and in England assembled the equipment necessary for a travelling circus. A voyage along the African East Coast saw them landing at Durban in February 1905. They toured the province, continuing to Johannesburg where Pagel worked on extending the repertoire of his circus.

A tour of South Africa followed and another to Rhodesia, the success of which established Pagel's Circus as a national institution. Pagel's feats of strength and his control of the big cats soon made him a household name, particularly in the countryside. However, the circus as a career remained financially hazardous.

In early 1906, Pagel and his wife travelled to India and Burma to acquire tigers, elephants and other animals. Madame Pagel herself entered the ring in an act starring lions, tigers and leopards.

The circus flourished until the advent of the First World War (1914–1918) when Pagel, because of his German origin, was regarded with grave suspicion by the authorities, and crowds became openly hostile. Madame Pagel displayed her marriage certificate above the box-office in an attempt to defuse the situation. Even so, Pagel was interned at Pietermaritzburg near the beginning of 1918 for a brief period.

After the war, he acquired South African citizenship.
