= Acron (King of the Caeninenses) =

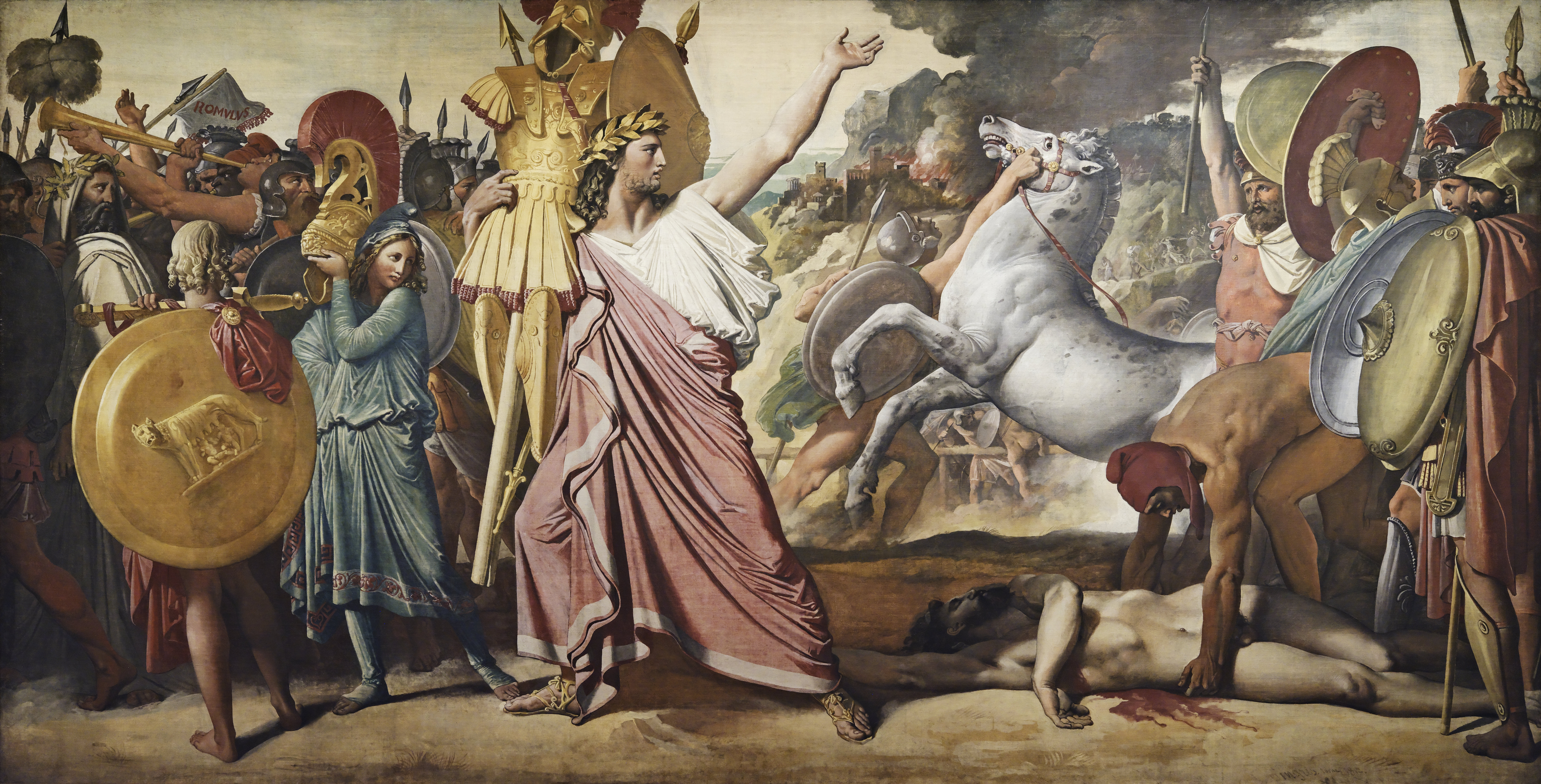
- Romulus' Victory Over Acron'
- Died: 753 BCE

Acron was the king of the Caeninenses, who rejected the proposal of the king of Rome, Romulus, which dictated that Romans intermarry with the locals of Caenina and other towns. Insulted, Romulus kidnapped Latin and Sabine women and forced them to marry, in an event known as the Rape of the Sabine Women.

The enraged Acron allied with the cities of Antemnae, Crustumerium, and the king of Cures, Titus Tatius, to fight Rome. Acron invaded Rome and began to lay waste to the countryside. Romulus, however, struck back and attacked the raiders, and even managed to capture Acron's camp. During the battle, Romulus slew Acron in a duel, and Romulus took his armor as spoils.

Following Acron's death, Romulus marched his army to Caenina, where he attacked and sacked the town. Romulus dictated that the remaining Caeninenses should relinquish their weapons and ordered many adult males to permanently relocate to Rome. Romulus took children as hostages. Romulus then forced the Caeninenses to destroy large parts of their city. The Caeninenses never challenged Rome again, following this conflict.

== Historicity ==
As there are no contemporary 8th-century BC sources on King Acron, it is probable that he is mythical.
