= Acron Group =

Russian fertiliser producer

PJSC Acron
- Type: Public (ПAO)
- Traded as: MCX: AKRN, LSE: AKRN
- Industry: Chemicals
- Founded: 1961
- Headquarters: Velikiy Novgorod, Russia
- Key people: Vladimir Kunitsky (CEO), Alexander Popov (Chairman)
- Products: Nitrogen fertilizers, nitrates
- Revenue: $1.66 billion (2020)
- Operating income: $361 million (2020)
- Net income: $52.7 million (2020)
- Total assets: $3.05 billion (2020)
- Total equity: $954 million (2020)
- Number of employees: 13,023
- Website: www.acron.ru/en

Acron Group (Russian: Группа "Акрон") is a global Russian mineral fertilizer producer.

== History ==
At the core of the Group are two production facilities, Acron (established in 1961) and Dorogobuzh (established in 1965), which at one time formed the basis of the Soviet fertiliser industry. After the collapse of the Soviet Union, both enterprises were privatised, underwent a large-scale revamping and adopted the long-term reconstruction and upgrade programme and consolidated corporate governance system.

The company in its current form exists since 2002, when Acron developed a vertically integrated business. In addition to its production assets, the Group has its own logistics and distribution networks and is investing in raw material projects. In order to strengthen its position in the world's largest fertiliser market – China – in 2005 the Group acquired complex fertiliser producer Hongri Acron and created its own extensive distribution network. In August 2016 Hongri Acron plant was sold to a Hong Kong industrial and investment company. In 2011 the company entered a joint venture with Rio Tinto to develop the Albany potash prospect in Saskatchewan, Canada.

== Ownership ==
As of December 2025, Redbrick Investments S.a.r.l. holds 34.16%, JSC Positive Investments and Management (FM)* — 17.68%, JSC Greenfert (FM)* — 16.05%, JSC Demetra (FM)* — 16.04%, Acron Group — 11.62%, National Settlement Depository (nominee holder) —1.48%, Others 2.97%.

* Fiduciary Management

The Group is ultimately controlled by Viatcheslav Kantor.

== Executives ==
Vladimir Kunitsky has been the Chairman of the Managing Board and CEO since 29 July 2011. Vladimir Gavrikov was executive director in 2005–2011; he is still a member of the board of directors and also a deputy of the duma (parliament) of Novgorod Oblast.

Chairman of the Board of Directors is Alexander Popov.

== Operations ==
Acron is a global mineral fertiliser producer of complex fertilisers such as NPK and bulk blends, and nitrogen fertilisers such as urea, ammonium nitrate and urea-ammonium nitrate. The Group's key markets are Russia, Brazil, Europe and the United States.
Acron has two production facilities – Acron (Veliky Novgorod, Russia) and Dorogobuzh (Smolensk Region, Russia). Acron's logistics and transportation capabilities include its own fleet of railway cars and three sea port trans-shipment facilities on the Baltic Sea – at the Kaliningrad port of Russia, at the Estonian Sillamäe port and at the Estonian Muuga port. The Group operates distribution networks in Russia and China. Acron employs over 13,000 people. North-Western Phosphorus Company (NWPC) was established by Acron in 2005 to secure an independent phosphate raw material base. On 24 October 2006 NWPC obtained state licences to develop apatite-nepheline ore deposits at the Oleniy Ruchey and Partomchorr fields in the Murmansk region.

Verkhnekamsk Potash Company (VPC) implements a project to create a potash raw material base for Acron Group. In 2008, Acron Group obtained a licence to develop the Talitsky area of the Verkhnekamsk potassium-magnesium salt deposit (VPMSD) with sylvinite reserves (categories А+В+С1) of 726.1 mn t. The deposit development is expected to start in 2018. However, construction was ongoing as of June 2019, and with a new $1.7 billion financing agreement concluded between Acron and PAO Sberbank, Gazprombank and Vnesheconombank to accelerate construction, production is set to begin "at the end of 2022 or the beginning of 2023."

In June 2014 the company described the Albany potash project which it develops with Rio Tinto as "one of the best potash development opportunities in the world."

== Subsidiaries ==
Acron USA Inc. was founded by Acron in 2008 to handle marketing, distribution and sea transportation of the Group's export cargos. Acron Switzerland AG was set up in 2009 to supply the Group's products to the European market. In 2018, Acron Group set up its distribution companies Acron Brasil Ltda. in Brazil and Acron Argentina S.R.L. in Argentina. The Group is currently developing its own distribution network in China, called Yong Sheng Feng. Yong Sheng Feng's key business is wholesaling fertilisers and other chemicals.

== Financial results ==
In 2020, the Group's output of ammonia and mineral fertilisers (exclusive of own use) totaled 8,0 million tonnes. In 2020 the Group's consolidated revenues under IFRS were RUB 119,864 billion (US$1.8 billion), and net profit was RUB 3,836 billion (US$53 million).

IFRS Financials

Item	9M 2021	2022	2023	2024	2025
1. Revenue, RUB mn	137,215	257,195	179,458	198,167	237,638
2. Net Profit, RUB mn	50,934	91,034	35,866	30,520	39,776

== Sales ==
The Group sells its products both via retailers and directly to end users. The Group established its own distribution network under the Agronova brand in 2005 to improve the efficiency of its domestic sales. Agronova comprises 9 specialised agrochemical companies, which allow direct access to product consumers in major farming regions of the country. The total storage capacity of the distribution network is 225,000 tonnes.
