= List of oldest surviving professional wrestlers =

This is a list of oldest surviving professional wrestlers. As of 2024, there are 43 living veterans from the "Golden Age of Wrestling" (1950s–1970s) over 75 years old. The last surviving wrestler from the "Pioneer Era" (WWWF) (1900s–1940s) was American wrestler Angelo Savoldi (born April 21, 1914, died September 13, 2013, aged 99 years, 145 days). The title of the oldest verified wrestler of all time belongs to Polish wrestler Abe Coleman (1905–2007), who lived 101 years, 189 days. The oldest person ever to be involved in the wrestling industry was promoter Harry Elliott (1904–2006), aged 101 years, 314 days.

The current oldest male living retired wrestler is Australia's Bill Verna, aged 95–96. The oldest female wrestler was Princess Bonita (1919–2014), aged 94 years, 273 days. The oldest female to be involved in the wrestling industry was Gorgeous George's valet Betty Wagner, who lived to the age of 98.

The oldest female wrestler to have a match is Mae Young, who defeated LayCool in a WWE Raw handicap match on November 15, 2010, at the age of 87. The oldest male wrestler to have a match is Baron Von Raschke, who wrestled in LaSalle, Illinois at age 86.

== List ==
=== Oldest wrestlers ever ===
Living

Rank	Name	Sex	Age	Birth	Death	Notes
1	Harry Elliott	M	101 years, 313 days	August 16, 1904	June 25, 2006	Was the promoter of Seattle wrestling, from 1958 to 1969 he was the sole promoter in Washington, Idaho, and Northeast Oregon.
2	Abe Coleman	M	101 years, 189 days	September 20, 1905	March 28, 2007	Oldest wrestler ever.
3	Joe D'Orazio	M	99 years, 225 days	July 27, 1922	March 9, 2022	Referee, and British Wrestlers Reunion president until BWR ended in January 2022 after 30 years.
4	Angelo Savoldi	M	99 years, 152 days	April 21, 1914	September 20, 2013	Last surviving veteran of the "Pioneer Era".
5	Bill Mercer	M	99 years, 38 days	February 13, 1926	March 23, 2025	Voice of World Class Championship Wrestling.
6	Jackie Stallone	F	98 years, 297 days	November 29, 1921	September 21, 2020	Manager and promoter for Gorgeous Ladies of Wrestling from 1986 to 1989. Mother of Sylvester Stallone.
7	Cesar Pabon	M	98 years, 201 days	February 23, 1928	September 12, 2026	Puerto Rican wrestler and bodybuilder who wrestled for the AWA from 1969 to 1981.
8	Dan McLeod	M	98 years, 6 days	June 14, 1860	June 20, 1958	Last surviving American Heavyweight Champion and veteran of the "Farmer" Burns-Frank Gotch era.
9	Betty Wagner	F	98 years	1912–1913	June 3, 2011	First wife and valet of Gorgeous George.
10	Jarvis Astaire	M	97 years, 319 days	October 6, 1923	August 21, 2021	Promoter for Joint Promotions in the United Kingdom in the early 1970s.
11	Pedro Septién	M	97 years, 273 days	March 21, 1916	December 19, 2013	Mexican actor, wrestling announcer and baseball broadcaster.
12	Gerry Hoggarth	M	97 years, 119 days	April 17, 1922	August 14, 2019	Began his career in the 1940s
13	Luis Magana	M	97 years	1910	March 23, 2008	Spanish announcer in boxing and wrestling in Los Angeles
14	Samson Burke	M	96 years, 223 days	April 8, 1930	Living	Canadian wrestler, actor, bodybuilder, swimmer. Known as Sammy Berg during his wrestling career.
15	Gorilla Pogi	M	96 years, 219 days	January 23, 1902	August 30, 1998	Italian-American wrestler most notably took part in the EMLL 1st Anniversary Show in 1934.
16	Jack LaLanne	M	96 years, 119 days	September 26, 1914	January 23, 2011	World-famous fitness guru, had a brief pro wrestling career in 1938.
17	Milo Steinborn	M	95 years, 328 days	March 18, 1893	February 9, 1989	Promoted wrestling in Florida
18	Abe Jacobs	M	95 years, 125 days	April 18, 1928	August 21, 2023	New Zealand wrestler. Former NWA World Tag Team Champion.
19	Hélio Gracie	M	95 years, 120 days	October 1, 1913	January 29, 2009	Brazilian martial artist who wrestled occasionally.
20	Bob Caudle	M	96 years, 107 days	August 2, 1930	November 16, 2025	Voice of Mid-Atlantic Championship Wrestling. Later announced in South Atlantic Pro Wrestling and Smoky Mountain Wrestling.
21	Meshulam Riklis	M	95 years, 54 days	December 2, 1923	January 25, 2019	Turkish-Israeli businessman that owned Gorgeous Ladies of Wrestling from 1986 to 2001.
22	Octavio Gaona Jr.	M	95 years, 44 days	October 4, 1931	Living	Son of Octavio Gaona
23	Andrew Tsimpides	M	95 years, 34 days	August 16, 1916	September 19, 2011	Former manager of Gorgeous George
24	Hank Garrett	M	95 years, 22 days	October 26, 1931	Living	Wrestled as The Minnesota Farm Boy from 1957 to 1966.
25	Princess Bonita	F	94 years, 273 days	May 31, 1919	February 28, 2014	Oldest female, mainly wrestled as Princess White Dove

=== Oldest female wrestlers ever ===
Living

Rank	Name	Sex	Age	Birth	Death	Notes
1	Princess Bonita	F	94 years, 273 days	May 31, 1919	February 28, 2014	Oldest female, mainly wrestled as Princess White Dove
2	Ann Lake	M	92–93 years	1933	Living	Inducted into the New England Pro Wrestling Hall of Fame.
3	Yukiko Tomoe	F	91 years, 16 days	November 1, 1935	Living	Oldest living female wrestler. First Japanese woman to win the NWA World Women's Championship in 1968.
4	Mae Young	F	90 years, 308 days	March 12, 1923	January 14, 2014	Oldest person to wrestle ever at 87 years old. Wrestled for WWF from 1999 to 2000, 2004 and 2010.
5	Lorraine Johnson	F	90 years, 217 days	March 2, 1930	October 5, 2020	
6	Kathy Starr	F	90 years, 162 days	June 8, 1936	Living	Wrestled mainly in Hawaii. Former Central States Women's Champion.
7	Irma Gonzalez	F	90 years, 89 days	August 20, 1936	Living	Wrestled mainly in Mexico and WCCW. Oldest surviving Mexican women wrestler.
8	Ethel Brown	F	90 years, 57 days	May 25, 1931	July 21, 2021	
9	Gladys Gillem	F	89 years, 218 days	January 6, 1920	August 12, 2009	Feuded with Mildred Burke.
10	Cora Combs	F	88 years, 96 days	March 17, 1927	June 21, 2015	

=== Oldest wrestlers currently living ===
Rank	Name	Sex	Age	Birth	Notes
1	Bill Verna	M	96–97 years	1929	Aussie wrestler won the British Empire/Commonwealth Heavyweight Championship.
2	Samson Burke	M	96 years, 223 days	April 8, 1930	Oldest Canadian Wrestler. Known as Sammy Berg. Also was a bodybuilder, swimmer, and actor.
3	Octavio Gaona Jr.	M	95 years, 44 days	October 4, 1931	Son of Octavio Gaona.
4	Hank Garrett	M	95 years, 22 days	October 26, 1931	Wrestled as The Minnesota Farm Boy from 1957 to 1966.
5	Nick Kozak	M	94 years, 14 days	November 3, 1932	Raised in Texas. Wrestled for Pacific Northwest, WCCW and NWA Georgia.
6	Steve Novak	M	93 years, 358 days	November 24, 1932	Wrestled in Studio Wrestling out of Pittsburgh in the 1950s and 1960s. Also wrestled as The Battling Bohemian and Red Menace.
7	Ann Lake	M	92–93 years	1933	Inducted into the New England Pro Wrestling Hall of Fame.
8	Keita Meretana	M	92–93 years	1933	Former NWA New Zealand Heavyweight Championship
9	Dory Dixon	M	92 years, 289 days	February 1, 1934	First Jamaican wrestler in the WWWF.
10	Guillotine Gordon	M	91 years, 307 days	January 14, 1935	Wrestled in the WWWF from 1964 to 1969. Later in his career he wrestled as Enforcer Luciano in NWA Hollywood.
11	Horst Hoffman	M	91 years, 49 days	September 29, 1935	German wrestler. Wrestled in Germany, France, Japan and AWA.
12	Paul Diamond	M	91 years, 24 days	October 24, 1935	Wrestled for NWA Vancouver and AWA from 1960 to 1972
13	Yukiko Tomoe	F	91 years, 16 days	November 1, 1935	Japanese female wrestler. Oldest living female wrestler. Former NWA World Women's Champion
14	Earl Maynard	M	90 years, 354 days	November 28, 1935	From Barbados former Mr. Universe, a bodybuilder wrestler in the 60s and 70s and teamed with Rocky Johnson. He wrestled for Pacific Northwest, Stampede, NWA, and WWWF.
15	Tony Kontellis	M	90–91 years	1935	Wrestled in Australia and WWWF
16	Eddie Sharkey	M	90 years, 286 days	February 4, 1936	Wrestled in AWA. Owns Pro Wrestling America. Also has trained many wrestlers like Rick Rude, Bob Backlund, Jesse Ventura, etc.
17	Escorpion I	M	90 years, 205 days	April 26, 1936	Mexican wrestler. Two time NWA Americas Tag Team Champion.
18	Kathy Starr	F	90 years, 162 days	June 8, 1936	Wrestled mainly in Hawaii. Former Central States Women's Champion.
19	Irma Gonzalez	F	90 years, 89 days	August 20, 1936	Wrestled mainly in Mexico and WCCW.
20	Black Gordman	M	90 years, 43 days	October 5, 1936	Well known in Los Angeles, Texas and WWWF from 1972 to 1974.
21	Eddie Morrow	M	89–90 years	1936	From Martinique wrestled for Pacific Northwest and Stampede Wrestling. Brother of Gerry Morrow. Resides in Calgary, Canada.
22	Mark Lewin	M	89 years, 246 days	March 16, 1937	Multi-time regional champion. Worked as Purple Haze.
23	Zivko Kovacic	M	89 years, 48 days	September 30, 1937	Croatian wrestler. Mid-West Tag Team Champion
24	Paul DeMarco (wrestler)	M	88–89 years	1937	Canadian wrestler. Former 3-time NWA Georgia Champion.
25	Steve Veidor	M	88 years, 311 days	January 10, 1938	Former European Heavyweight Champion.
26	Omar Atlas	M	88 years, 209 days	April 22, 1938	Former NWA Central States Heavyweight Champion. Worked for WWF from 1986 to 1992.
27	Johnny Rodz	M	88 years, 185 days	May 16, 1938	WWE Hall of Famer. Worked for WWF (WWWF) from 1965 to 1985.
28	Gantetsu Matsuoka	M	87 years, 357 days	November 25, 1938	Former two-time NWA United States Tag Team Champion.
29	Harvey Smith (equestrian)	M	87 years, 323 days	December 29, 1938	British show jumping champion. Wrestled occasionally in the 1970s.
30	Lumberjack Pierre	M	87 years, 277 days	February 13, 1939	Former WWWF World Tag Team Champion.
31	Chuck Wepner	M	87 years, 264 days	February 26, 1939	Former professional boxer. Fought Andre the Giant at Showdown At Shea in 1976.
32	George Hultz	M	87 years, 255 days	March 7, 1939	Former NFL football player. Had a short career in Tri-State and Alabama from 1969 to 1974.
33	Lars Anderson	M	87 years, 248 days	March 14, 1939	Five-time NWA Polynesian Pacific Heavyweight Champion.
35	Tinieblas	M	87 years, 162 days	June 8, 1939	One time WWA World Heavyweight Champion.
36	Ramona Isbella	F	87 years, 150 days	June 20, 1939	African-American female wrestler
37	Fred Peloquin	M	87 years, 16 days	November 1, 1939	Known as Mad Dog Peloquin in Winnipeg and AWA. Three-time WFWA Canadian Heavyweight Champion.
38	El Matematico	M	86 years, 211 days	April 20, 1940	Mexican wrestler
39	Spiros Arion	M	86 years, 75 days	September 3, 1940	Egyptian-Greek wrestler. Well known in the WWWF from 1966 to 1978.

=== Oldest wrestlers to ever perform 70 and over ===
Still active

Rank	Name	Sex	Age in last match	Birth	Death	Date of last match	Notes
1	Mae Young	F	87 years, 248 days	March 12, 1923	January 14, 2014	November 15, 2010	She took part in a Falls Count Anywhere 2-on-1 Handicap Match against LayCool (Layla and Michelle McCool) on WWE's Old School Raw, when she put her foot over Layla for a pinfall victory outside the ring.
2	Baron Von Raschke	M	86 years, 72 days	July 30, 1940	Still Living	October 10, 2026	He took part in gauntlet match entering at No. 10, eliminating Sidney Bakabella and Jordan Kross using his signature "Iron Claw" hold to win the gauntlet. This took place at Sidney Bakabella's Halloween Ball Gauntlet Extravaganza (at Dreamwave's "Trick or Treat" show) in LaSalle, Illinois.
3	KY Wakamatsu	M	84 years, 320 days	January 1, 1942	Living	Still active	Last wrestled on August 15, 2026, for Shonan Pro Wrestling in Yokohama, Japan, teaming with Yuki Takasugi in a loss to the team of Kazuhiko Matsuzaki and Raijin Yaguchi.
4	Kendo Nagasaki	M	84 years, 43 days	October 11, 1941	Living	November 23, 2025	Most recently wrestled on November 23, 2025, for LDN Wrestling, teaming with the tag team Dead Gorgeous to defeat Sage Valentine, Sanjay Bagga & Stevie Fee in Croydon, England.
5	Jimmy Valiant	M	83 years, 262 days	August 6, 1942	Living	April 25, 2026	Wrestled on April 25, 2026 "Boogie's Last Dance" for NAWA Championship Wrestling in Lancaster, South Carolina teaming with Magnet Man and Moonshine Express (Big Nasty & Dusty Money) defeating Curtis Robertson, Deon Johnson, Mike Maughn and Tommy Thomas.
6	Dory Funk Jr.	M	83 years, 203 days	February 3, 1941	August 4, 2026	August 24, 2024	Wrestled on Frontier Martial-Arts Wrestling-Explosion Terry Funk Memorial & Atsushi Onita 50th Anniversary event teaming with Osamu Nishimura to defeat Atsushi Onita and Raijin Yaguchi in Kawasaki, Japan.
7	Great Kojika	M	82 years, 357 days	April 28, 1942	Living	April 20, 2025	Most recently wrestled on April 20, 2025, for Niigata Pro Wrestling in Niigata, Japan, teaming with Tatsumi Fujinami and LEONA to defeat the team of Akira Jo, Isami Kodaka and Ryota Nakatsu.
8	Popoff Le Gitan	M	82 years, 227 days	March 12, 1943	Living	October 25, 2025	Last wrestled for KHAO in Plouasne, France, defeating Koro. Also known as Theo Pouzade and Domingo Valdez.
9	Dave Kidney	M	82 years, 39 days	September 5, 1930	July 21, 2020	October 14, 2012	Last known match took place in Dalkeith, Scotland.
10	Killer Kowalski	M	81 years, 153 days	October 13, 1926	August 30, 2008	March 14, 2008	Kowalski wrestled his last match as he defeated Gino Giovanni with the clawhold at Top Rope Promotions in Fall River, Massachusetts.
11	The Fabulous Moolah	F	81 years, 61 days	July 22, 1923	November 2, 2007	September 21, 2004	Teamed with Mae Young to defeat Dawn Marie and Torrie Wilson in a tag team match at the WWE SmackDown taping. The match aired on TV two days later.
12	Dominic DeNucci	M	80 years, 82 days	January 23, 1932	August 12, 2021	April 14, 2012	DeNucci wrestled his last match at a PWS card in Toronto, Ontario, Canada, teaming up with Shane Douglas to defeat the team of Lord Zoltan and Shawn Blanchard.
13	Tinieblas	M	80 years, 71 days	June 8, 1939	Living	August 18, 2019	Last wrestled at the 2019 Expo Lucha convention in San Diego, California, teaming up with Dr. Wagner Jr. and Octagón to defeat the team of Fuerza Guerrera, Misterioso Jr., and Pirata Morgan.
14	Bob Armstrong	M	80 years, 30 days	October 3, 1939	August 27, 2020	November 2, 2019	Armstrong's last match was for New Heights Wrestling in Caryville, Florida, where he lost to The Assassin by count-out.
15	Ox Baker	M	80 years, 0 days	April 19, 1934	October 20, 2014	April 19, 2014	Wrestled his last match on his 80th birthday against Bobo Brazil Jr. at a CCW card in Marion, Ohio.
16	Bushwhacker Luke	M	79 years, 313 days	January 8, 1947	Living	Still active	Most recently wrestled on July 26, 2026, at AWE Anniversay XIX in Petersham, New South Wales, Australia teaming with Scotty Magnum and Psychotic defeating Robbie Zucco, Tristan Slade and Osama Hussein.
17	Mr. Chile	M	79 years, 279 days	November 21, 1942	Living	August 27, 2022	Last wrestled for Valparaiso Lucha Libre in Valparaiso, Chile, teaming with Angel Blanco to defeat La Momia Porteña and Zaddam.
18	John Cena Sr.	M	79 years, 170 days	June 16, 1944	Living	December 3, 2023	The biological father of John Cena. He wrestled his last match for LIVE Pro Wrestling in New Bedford, Massachusetts, defeating Smart Mark Sterling.
19	Chick Donovan	M	79 years, 15 days	March 7, 1947	Living	March 22, 2026	Most recently wrestled on March 22, 2026, for Create A Pro Wrestling teaming with Just Joe, CPA and Evil Kip defeating Jackson Crowe, JGeorge, Liam Davis and Seabass Finn in Lynbrook, New York.
20	Victor Jovica	M	78 years, 195 days	November 26, 1945	Living	June 8, 2024	Wrestled his last match at CWA Colision En La Bahia in Catano, Puerto Rico where he teamed with La Industria Honorable (Alfred Allen, Angel Rodriguez and Black Scorpion) losing to Los Hermanos Rivera (Marcial Rivera & Wilfredo Rivera) in a 4 on 2 handicap match.
21	Frank Hickey	M	78 years, 66 days	March 10, 1915	December 8, 1993	May 15, 1993	Wrestled his last match at a USWA event in Nashville, Tennessee, teaming with Brian Christopher in a loss to Frank Morrell and Koko B. Ware. He died a few months later.
22	George Julio	M	78 years, 27 days	March 10, 1946	Living	April 6, 2024	Last wrestled for Victoria Professional Wrestling in Strathmore, Victoria, Australia, defeating Mason Stoneheart in a Street Fight.
23	Yoshiaki Fujiwara	M	77 years, 46 days	April 27, 1949	Living	June 12, 2026	Most recently wrestled on June 12, 2026, for Up Town Show in Tokyo, Japan, defeating Kuroshio TOKYO Japan.
24	Gypsy Joe	M	77 years, 36 days	December 2, 1933	June 14, 2016	January 7, 2011	Joe wrestled his last match at the Gypsy Joe retirement show held in Tullahoma, Tennessee by the Southern Wrestling Federation.
25	Mike Jackson	M	77 years, 6 days	November 11, 1949	Living	Still active	Most recently wrestled on September 26, 2026, for All Star Wrestling in Greysville, Alabama in a four-way match won by Jerry Joyner.
26	Mil Máscaras	M	76 years, 237 days	July 15, 1942	Living	March 9, 2019	Last wrestled for Lucha Libre Acapulco in Acapulco, Mexico, teaming with Capitan Atomo and Dragon Lee to defeat the team of La Bestia del Ring, Rey Bucanero, and Valiente.
27	Vince McMahon	M	76 years, 222 days	August 24, 1945	Living	April 3, 2022	Wrestled his last match at WrestleMania 38 in Arlington, Texas, defeating Pat McAfee.
28	Kim Duk	M	76 years, 199 days	February 7, 1948	Living	August 24, 2024	Wrestled his last match at the FMW-E Terry Funk Memorial & Atsushi Onita 50th Anniversary in Kawasaki, Japan, where he teamed with Yuichi Taniguchi defeating Chikara and Masahiko Takasugi.
29	El Satánico	M	76 years, 145 days	October 26, 1949	Living	March 20, 2026	Wrestled his last match for CMLL in Mexico City, Mexico, as he defeated Blue Panther and Atlantis in a triple threat.
30	José González	M	76 years, 141 days	March 18, 1946	Living	August 6, 2022	Most recently wrestled on August 6, 2022, for IWA Puerto Rico, teaming with Savio Vega defeated Manny Ferno, Mr. Big and El Bronco in a handicap match.
31	Claude Roca	M	76 years, 127 days	March 18, 1945	Living	July 23, 2021	Last wrestled for ABC Wrestling in Béziers, France, losing to Matthew Ford.
32	Jackie Fargo	M	76 years, 82 days	June 26, 1930	June 24, 2013	September 16, 2006	Wrestled in a tag team match with Jeff Justice and Officer McKenny to defeat Dr. Tom Prichard, Beau James and The Sheik of Araby for Big Time Wrestling in Granite Quarry, North Carolina.
33	Frank Durso	M	76 years, 52 days	January 30, 1937	December 7, 2018	March 23, 2013	Wrestled in a tag team match with Shawn Blanchard and Lou Martin to defeat Bobby O, Kris Kash, Shane Starr and Justin Sane for Keystone State Wrestling Alliance in Pittsburgh, Pennsylvania.
34	King Cobra	M	76 years, 52 days	March 14, 1948	Living	May 5, 2024	Teamed with Michael as they defeated the Hollywood Clique (Jimmy Blaylock and Van Vicious) at Championship Wrestling From Memphis in Memphis, Tennessee.
35	Bill Dundee	M	76 years, 51 days	October 24, 1943	September 6, 2026	December 14, 2019	Wrestled last for Bobby Eaton: A Night Of Appreciation event in Knoxville, Tennessee, where he teamed with George South, Beau James, and Stan Lee as they lost to Bobby Fulton, Brad Thomas, Ryan Dookie, and Shane Williams.
36	Kenny Jay	M	75 years, 77 days	March 27, 1937	February 2, 2023	June 16, 2012	Last wrestled in an 11-person Royal Rumble style match, where he entered last and won, last eliminating Erik Lockhart, for Rock n Roll Wrestling in Wahpeton, North Dakota.
37	El Matematico	M	75 years, 27 days	April 20, 1940	Living	May 17, 2015	Wrestled his last match for FMLL teaming with Mano Negra and Jalisco as they lost to Blue Panther, Damián 666, and Negro Navarro in El Monte, California.
38	Octavio Gaona	M	74 years, 304 days	March 22, 1902	June 26, 1996	January 20, 1977	Wrestled his last match at a show in Guadalajara, Mexico teaming with his grandson, Arturo Gaona and Bucanero I defeating Babe Sharon, Comando I and Luis Chavir.
39	Lou Thesz	M	74 years, 246 days	April 24, 1916	April 28, 2002	December 26, 1990	The former undisputed World Heavyweight Champion last wrestled for New Japan Pro Wrestling in Hamamatsu, Japan, losing to Masahiro Chono.
40	Father Time	M	74 years, 244 days	August 25, 1951	Living	April 26, 2026	Most recently wrestled on April 26, 2026, for Pure Pro Wrestling in Flint, Michigan, losing to Big D to drop the PPW Michigan State Heavyweight Championship.
41	El Canek	M	74 years, 151 days	June 19, 1952	Living	Still active	Most recently wrestled on June 21, 2026, for Imperio Lucha Libre in Ciudad Nezahualcoyotl, Mexico, teaming with El Canek Jr. and Hijo de Canek defeating Celestial, Halloween Jr. and Rey Vikingo.
42	Bob Orton Jr.	M	74 years, 97 days	November 10, 1950	Living	February 15, 2025	Most recently wrestled for Midwest Wrestling Coalition in the St Louis, MO area, where he fought Attila Khan to a double countout.
43	The Great Gama	M	73–74 years	May 22, 1878	May 23, 1960	1952	Sources say that Gama remained active as a wrestler until 1952.
44	Johnny Saint	M	73 years, 349 days	June 29, 1941	Living	June 13, 2015	Wrestled his last match for Italian Championship Wrestling in Brescia, Italy, teaming with Manuel Majoli to defeat Mr. Excellent and Psycho Mike.
45	Adrian Street	M	73 years, 191 days	December 5, 1940	July 31, 2023	June 14, 2014	Wrestled his last match for NWA Wrestle Birmingham, in Birmingham, Alabama.
46	Ric Flair	M	73 years, 156 days	February 25, 1949	Living	July 31, 2022	Wrestled his last match in Nashville, Tennessee, teaming with his son-in-law Andrade El Idolo to defeat the team of Jay Lethal and Jeff Jarrett at the Ric Flair's Last Match pay-per-view.
47	Estrella Blanca	M	73 years, 92 days	January 15, 1938	November 15, 2021	April 17, 2011	Wrestled his last match on a AAA show in a loss to El Pistolero in San Pedro Cholula, Mexico.
48	Terry Funk	M	73 years, 85 days	June 30, 1944	August 23, 2023	September 23, 2017	Last wrestled for Big Time Wrestling in Spartanburg, South Carolina where he teamed with the Rock 'n' Roll Express as they defeated Doug Gilbert, Jerry Lawler and Brian Christopher.
49	Jerry Lawler	M	73 years, 53 days	November 29, 1949	Living	January 21, 2023	Last wrestled for AML Acts Of War Games 2 in Winston-Salem, North Carolina defeating Beer City Bruiser.
50	Mr. Wrestling II	M	73 years, 33 days	September 10, 1934	June 10, 2020	October 13, 2007	Last wrestled for Hawaii Championship Wrestling as he teamed up with Steve Corino and won the HCW Kekaulike Heritage Tag Team Championship title.
51	Dick the Bruiser Jr.	M	73 years, 12 days	August 4, 1952	Living	August 16, 2025	Most recently wrestled for Pro Wrestling King in Fort Wayne, Indiana, teaming with Malachi, Shawn Sparks, and Top Gun Shuler to defeat the team of Alex Rase, BD Smooth, Mitchell Taylor, and Ryan Paradise.
52	Mitsuo Momota	M	73 years, 8 days	September 21, 1948	Living	September 29, 2021	Wrestled last match for Asakusa Pro Wrestling in Tokyo, Japan, where he teamed with Chikara to defeat Destroyman and Mr. Atomiko.
53	Sergio El Hermoso	M	72–73 years	1946	May 14, 2021	August 17, 2019	Wrestled his last match teaming with Zoraya to defeat Carta Brava and Fantasma de la Opera by disqualification at Promociones HUMO in Mexico City, Mexico.
54	Tatsumi Fujinami	M	72 years, 324 days	December 28, 1953	Living	Still active	Most recently wrestled on July 18, 2026, teaming with LEONA defeating Big THE Ryokan and Makoto Maeda for Niigata Pro Wrestling in Niigaya, Japan.
55	Black Terry	M	72 years, 206 days	September 3, 1952	April 20, 2025	March 28, 2025	Wrestled his last match for CVW Wresting in Atizapán de Zaragoza, Mexico, losing to Kundra.
56	Tony Atlas	M	72 years, 208 days	April 23, 1954	Living	Still active	Most recently wrestled on September 6, 2026, for Limitless Wrestling in Portland, Maine, defeating Sidney Bakabella.
57	Fuerza Guerrera	M	72 years, 196 days	December 13, 1953	Living	June 27, 2026	Most recently wrestled on June 27, 2026, for PatronMania I in Apodaca, Mexico, in a 6 tag amtch with Alish Aguerrida and Payasita Pura Santa defeating Baby Love, Karisma and Lady Jagaur.
58	Woody Farmer	M	72 years, 109 days	December 25, 1935	February 29, 2012	April 12, 2008	Wrestled his last match for Bay Wrestling Federation in Alameda, California, teaming with his son Shane Kody and his grandson Riot defeating Boom Boom Comini, Johnny Starr and Mr. Frost.
59	The Cuban Assassin	M	72 years, 92 days	January 27, 1945	Living	April 29, 2017	Last wrestled for Ultimate Championship Wrestling in Halifax, Nova Scotia, Canada, teaming with Bushwhacker Luke and Dillon Sharpe to defeat the team of Brett Howett, Jakob Moore and Kris Hicks.
60	Cien Caras	M	72 years, 27 days	October 18, 1949	Living	November 14, 2021	Last wrestled on November 14, 2021, for an event in Guadalajara, Mexico where he defeated El Gallo for the Arena Jalisco Heavyweight Title.
61	Billy Riley	M	71–72 years	June 22, 1896	August 27, 1977	1968	Last known match took place in 1968.
T-62	Gustav Frištenský	M	72 years (unverified)	May 18, 1879	April 6, 1957	1951	It is said that Gustav Frištenský wrestled until the age of 72.
T-62	Warren Bockwinkel	M	72 years (unverified)	May 21, 1911	March 25, 1986	1983	It is said that Warren Bockwinkel, father of Nick Bockwinkel, wrestled until the age of 72.
T-62	Les Kellett	M	72 years (unverified)	May 11, 1915	January 9, 2002	1987	It is said that Les Kellett wrestled until the age of 72.
63	Jimmy Snuka	M	71 years, 362 days	May 18, 1943	January 15, 2017	May 15, 2015	His last match was at an ECPW event, where he teamed up with Frankie Flow to defeat the team of Andrew Anderson and Jason Knight.
64	Ron Fuller	M	71 years, 328 days	March 3, 1948	Living	January 25, 2020	Last wrestled on January 25, 2020, for Continental Championship Wrestling in Dothan, Alabama, teaming with Jimmy Golden to defeat The Dirty Blondes (Leo Brien and Mike Patrick).
65	Ultraman	M	71 years, 321 days	July 14, 1947	Living	May 31, 2019	His last match was teaming with El Solar and Super Astro as they defeated Black Terry, Negro Navarro, and Mano Negra at an event in Cuautitlan, Mexico.
66	Masanobu Kurisu	M	71 years, 304 days	November 15, 1946	Living	September 15, 2018	His last match was teaming with Shigeo Okumura and Felino as they defeated, Mano Negra, Solar I, and Villano IV at the ExpoMuseo event in Benito Juarez, Mexico.
67	Mae Weston	F	71 years, 138 days	January 30, 1923	October 14, 1999	June 17, 1994	Wrestled in her last match in a tag team match with Stormy Apple as they lost to Josie Navarro and Margaret Garcia at Ladies International Wrestling Association in Las Vegas, Nevada.
68	John Pesek	M	71 years, 124 days	February 21, 1894	March 21, 1978	June 25, 1965	Wrestled in his last match defeating Frenchy Roberre at a Pacific Northwest Wrestling event in Portland, Oregon.
69	Américo Rocca	M	71 years, 121 days	September 22, 1952	Living	January 21, 2024	Most recently wrestled on January 21, 2024, for CROM Jalisco in Guadalajara, Mexico, teaming with Mortis and Funebre to defeat the team of Avigor, Principle Dragon and Shezmu.
70	Rocky Santana	M	71 years, 114 days	July 26, 1955	Living	Still active	Most recently wrestled on July 23, 2026, in Naucalpan de Juarez, Mexico for IWRG/CMLL/LLB Todo O Nada teaming with Romano Garica and El Gallego as they lost to Lunatik Extreme, Ovett Jr. and Super Boy.
71	Afa Anoaʻi	M	71 years, 100 days	November 21, 1942	August 16, 2024	March 1, 2014	Wrestled his last match with his sons Afa Anoa'i Jr., LA Smooth, Samu and his grandson Lance Anoa'i. They defeated Homicide, AC Anderson, Eric Cobain, Havok and Mustafa Aziz in a 10-tag match for his promotion World Xtreme Wrestling in Allentown, Pennsylvania.
T-72	Ivan Koloff	M	71 years, 83 days	August 25, 1942	February 18, 2017	November 16, 2013	Wrestled his last match as he lost to Bob Armstrong at Superstars of Wrestling 1 in Rome, Georgia.
T-72	Stu Hart	M	71 years, 83 days	May 3, 1915	October 16, 2003	July 25, 1986	Wrestled his last match in a tag team match with his son, Keith defeating Honky Tonk Wayne and JR Foley at Stampede Wrestling in Calgary, Alberta, Canada.
74	Jaque Mate	M	70 years, 351 days	September 29, 1948	Living	September 15, 2019	Wrestled his last match at the VerdugoMania 3rd Anniversary show in Tonala, Jalisco, Mexico, teaming with Jaque Mate Jr., Rafaga, and Rayman in a loss to the team of Américo Rocca, El Gallego, Huracán Ramirez, and Starman.
75	Bobo Brazil Jr.	M	70 years, 312 days	September 14, 1952	Living	July 23, 2023	Wrestled for FEW Unbreakable in Greenfield, Indiana, defeating Jacob Rose.
76	Oriental	M	70 years, 306 days	November 1, 1950	January 12, 2025	September 3, 2021	His last match was teaming with Centenario and Tronos losing to Lil Blay, Miles Deville and Sweet Daddy Soul for ULLO Promociones in Orizaba, Veracruz, Mexico.
77	Ricky Knight	M	70 years, 272 days	December 24, 1953	Living	September 21, 2024	Teamed with his sons Roy Knight and Zak Knight to defeat the team of Brad Slayer, Sam Bates and Swede at his promotion World Association Of Wrestling Fightmare 6 in Norwich, England.
78	Katsuji Ueda	M	70 years, 236 days	December 15, 1945	April 20, 2017	August 7, 2016	Wrestled his last match for Frontier Martial-Arts Wrestling in Tokyo, Japan, defeating HASEGAWA and The Shooter in a MMA Three Way match.
79	El Sicodelico	M	70 years, 226 days	April 4, 1944	Living	November 16, 2014	Wrestled his last match in an event in Mexico City, Mexico, teaming with Mil Mascaras and Dos Caras defeating Brazo de Oro, Brazo de Plata and Brazo de Platino.
80	Nikolai Volkoff	M	70 years, 203 days	October 14, 1947	July 29, 2018	May 5, 2018	Wrestled his last match for Battleground Championship Wrestling in Feasterville, Pennsylvania, teaming with Jim Duggan to defeat the team of Mecha Mercenary and Nicky Benz.
81	Masanobu Fuchi	M	70 years, 188 days	January 14, 1954	Living	July 20, 2024	Most recently wrestled on July 20, 2024, for All Japan Pro Wrestling in Tokyo, Japan, losing to Yuma Anzai.
82	El Solar	M	70 years, 175 days	May 26, 1956	Living	Still Active	Wrestled on September 20, 1956, for CMLL teaming with Neon losing to Blue Panther and Xeelhua in a four-way tag match in Mexico City, Mexico.
83	Águila Solitaria	M	70 years, 66 days	August 31, 1954	Living	November 5, 2024	Most recently wrestled on November 5, 2024, in Pachuca, Mexico for MaxProad teaming with Falcon Jr., and Halcon 78 as they defeated Negro Navarro, Oriental and Rugido.
84	Baron Michele Leone	M	70 years, 67 days	June 8, 1909	November 26, 1988	August 14, 1979	Wrestled his last match defeating Rat Ferraro at a wrestling event in Montreal, Canada.
85	Yoshiaki Yatsu	M	70 years, 27 days	July 19, 1956	Living	August 15, 2026	Wrestled for NWCA Aid In Tokyo teaming with Kazunori Yoshida and Shinigami as they defeated Great Pogo, Leatherface and Lil Kraken in Tokyo, Japan.
86	Ultra Seven	M	70 years, 60 days	June 17, 1955	Living	August 16, 2025	Wrestled for Shonan Pro teaming with Yuki Takasugi as they defeated Machince Seven and Navy Curry Tiger in Yokohama, Japan.
87	Ricky Morton	M	70 years, 57 days	September 21, 1956	Living	Still Active	Wrestled on October 10, 2026, losing to Nick Hamrick at Appalachian Championship Wrestling in Wayne, West Virginia.
88	The Great Kabuki	M	70 years, 22 days	September 8, 1948	Living	September 30, 2018	Wrestled his last match at a show that was independently produced by Masakatsu Funaki in Osaka, Japan, teaming with Giant Small Baba, Small Antonio Inoki, and Teruko Kagawa to defeat the team of HIRO Dai Circus Yasuda, Mitsukuni Daiso, Waka Shoyo, and Yamaishi Meijin in an 8-person tag team match.

=== Oldest wrestlers still wrestling ===
Rank	Name	Sex	Age	Birth	Notes
1	KY Wakamatsu	M	84 years, 320 days	January 1, 1942	Still wrestles in Japan.
2	Bushwhacker Luke	M	79 years, 313 days	January 8, 1947	Still wrestles for independent shows.
3	Mike Jackson	M	77 years, 6 days	November 11, 1949	Still wrestles for independent shows.
4	Tatsumi Fujinami	M	72 years, 324 days	December 28, 1953	Wrestles in Japan as of 2026.
5	Tony Atlas	M	72 years, 208 days	April 23, 1954	Still wrestles for independent shows.
6	Rocky Santana	M	71 years, 114 days	July 26, 1955	Still wrestles in Mexico.
7	El Solar	M	70 years, 176 days	May 25, 1956	Still wrestles in Mexico.
8	Tommy Rich	M	70 years, 114 days	July 26, 1956	Still wrestles for independent shows.
9	Ricky Morton	M	70 years, 57 days	September 21, 1956	Still wrestles for independent shows.
10	Hiroshi Shimada	M	70 years, 7 days	November 10, 1956	Still wrestles in Japan.

== See also ==
- List of premature professional wrestling deaths
