= 1935 in professional wrestling =

1935 in professional wrestling describes the year's events in the world of professional wrestling.

== Gallery ==
Video footage of professional wrestling in 1935
A professional wrestling match between Danno O'Mahony and Chief Little Wolf in Yankee Stadium, New York City, USA in 1935.

== List of notable promotions ==
Only one promotion held notable shows in 1935.

Promotion Name	Abbreviation
Empresa Mexicana de Lucha Libre	EMLL

== Calendar of notable shows ==
Date	Promotion(s)	Event	Location	Main event
September 26	EMLL	EMLL 2nd Anniversary Show	Mexico City, Mexico	Eric Bouloff defeated Bobby Segura in a Singles match

== Championship changes ==
=== EMLL ===
Mexican National Heavyweight Championship
incoming champion - Francisco Aguayo
No title changes

Mexican National Middleweight Championship
incoming champion – Uncertain
No title changes

Mexican National Lightweight Championship
incoming champion - Jack O'Brien
No title changes

Mexican National Welterweight Championship
incoming champion – Mario Nuñez
No title changes

== Debuts ==
- Debut date uncertain:
  - Angelo Savoldi
  - Freddie Blassie
  - Gargantua
  - Vince McMahon Sr.
- February 26 – Frank Stojack

== Retirements ==
- Atholl Oakeley (15 December 1930-1935)
- George Wilson (1930-August 25, 1935)

== Births ==
- January 14 – Guillotine Gordon
- January 21 – Jack Tunney(died in 2004)
- March 16 – Lorenzo Parente (died in 2014)
- March 21 – Chief Little Eagle (died in 1990)
- March 22 – Hisashi Shinma (died in 2025)
- April 19 – Sam Bass (wrestler) (died in 1976)
- May 5 – Billy Two Rivers (died in 2023)
- May 6 – Ted Lewin (died in 2021)
- May 14 – Ethel Johnson (wrestler) (died in 2018)
- May 27 – Tarzan Taborda (died in 2005)
- June 5 – Rickin Sánchez (died in 2023)
- June 9 – Dutch Savage (died in 2013)
- July 2 – Whitey Caldwell(died in 1972)
- July 6 – Moose Morowski (died in 2016)
- July 7 – Smasher Sloan (died in 2001)
- July 15
  - Tony Charles(died in 2015)
  - Alex Karras (died in 2012)
- July 21 – Nelson Royal (died in 2002)
- July 28 – Luke Brown(died in 1997)
- August 21 – Judy Grable (died in 2008)
- August 31 – Bearcat Brown(died in 1996)
- September 5 – Ray Stevens (wrestler)(died in 1996)
- September 29 – Horst Hoffman
- October 6 – Bruno Sammartino(died in 2018)
- October 14 – Jack Lanza(died in 2021)
- October 24 – Paul Diamond (Paul Lehman)
- November 1 – Yukiko Tomoe
- November 17 – Johnny Weaver(died in 2008)
- November 28 – Earl Maynard
- December 13 – Hogan Wharton (died in 2008)
- December 25 – Woody Farmer (died in 2012)
