= Joe Savoldi =

Italian-American athlete and spy

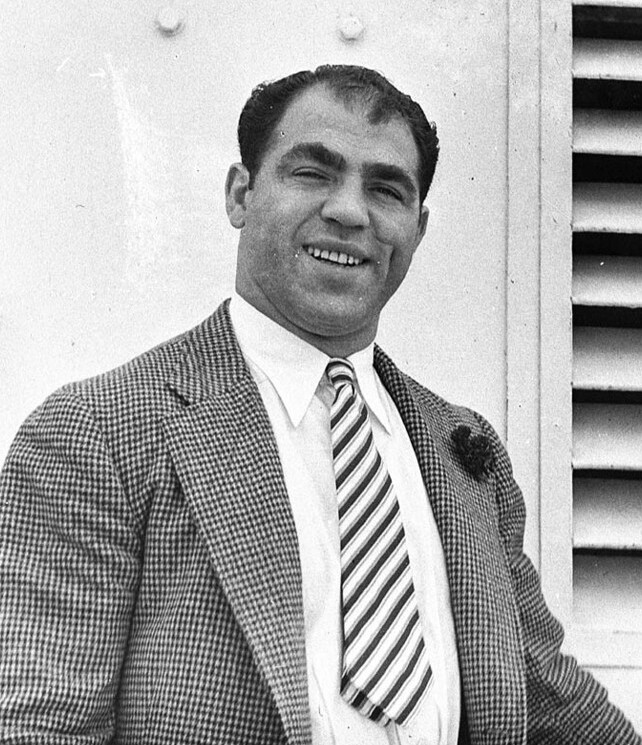
- Savoldi in 1936
- Born: Giuseppe Antonio Savoldi; March 5, 1908; Castano Primo, Province of Milan, Italy
- Died: January 25, 1974 (aged 65); Henderson, Kentucky, US
- Education: University of Notre Dame
- Professional wrestling career
- Ring name: Jumping Joe Savoldi
- Billed height: 5 ft 11 in (1.80 m)
- Billed weight: 255 lb (116 kg)
- Billed from: Milan, Italy
- Trained by: Billy Sandow; Ed “Strangler” Lewis
- Debut: 1931
- Retired: 1950
- Football career

Profile
- Position: Fullback

Personal information
- Listed height: 5 ft 11 in (1.80 m)
- Listed weight: 270 lb (122 kg)

Career information
- High school: Three Oaks (Three Oaks, Michigan)
- College: Notre Dame

Career history
- Chicago Bears (1930)

Awards and highlights
- Second-team All-American (1930)
- Stats at Pro Football Reference

Joseph Anthony Savoldi Jr. (born Giuseppe Antonio Savoldi; March 5, 1908 – January 25, 1974), commonly known by his nickname "Jumping Joe" Savoldi, was an Italian-American professional wrestler, football player, and special operations agent for the Office of Strategic Services (OSS) during World War II.

== Early life ==
Savoldi was born two months premature in Castano Primo, about 22 miles from Milan, Italy. He spent his childhood in Castano Primo and Bergamo, and was raised by his grandmother and an aunt before finally joining his family in Three Oaks, Michigan at age 12. Giuseppe Savoldi anglicized his first name to "Joe" and became an athlete in high school, excelling in football, basketball, baseball, and track.

== Football career ==
=== Notre Dame ===
After graduation from Three Oaks High, he enrolled at the University of Notre Dame, where, beginning in 1928, he played football for the Fighting Irish teams coached by Knute Rockne. His first start for Notre Dame came during his sophomore year against would-be national champion, Georgia Tech, after Rockne's first, second, and third string fullbacks all fell to injuries. The following week, coach Rockne moved Savoldi from running back to the line, and Savoldi briefly quit the squad before being moved back to the running back position.

The All-American fullback was first nicknamed, "Galloping Joe," followed by "The Wandering Wop," followed by "The People's Choice," before finally earning the moniker "Jumping Joe." The nickname that finally stuck, was a result of a play he made in a 1929 game against Carnegie Tech, when he scored a touchdown by diving up and over the goal line to win the game. Although commonplace now, diving over the line of scrimmage could be dangerous during a period of leather helmets and little, or no, shoulder padding. Other career highlights for Savoldi came on October 4, 1930, when he scored the first ever Notre Dame touchdown at the newly opened Notre Dame Stadium; and one week later, when he scored three touchdowns against Navy, sealing his fame as "the first hero in the lore of Notre Dame's $750,000.00 stadium." Savoldi averaged 11 yards per carry and 40 yards per kick off return, and due to his size (5 feet 11 inches (1.80 m) 218 pounds (99 kg)) was known for his punishing style of running the ball. His career came to a sudden end on November 17, 1930, when he withdrew from school after divorce papers were filed, and news of his secret marriage was leaked to the press. Savoldi and his Notre Dame teammates were undefeated national champions during both the 1929 and 1930 seasons.

=== NFL ===
Upon Savoldi's expulsion from Notre Dame, he was first signed by Curly Lambeau of the Green Bay Packers, but when local Chicago Bears fans heard the news, their harsh criticism of George Halas not signing Savoldi led to an elaborate double-cross of Lambeau. According to Halas, Lambeau had broken the newly created "Grange Rule" by signing Savoldi prior to his senior class having graduated. But as soon as Lambeau retracted Savoldi's contract, Halas signed Savoldi, and Jumping Joe joined the Bears. Lambeau and the Packers then protested with commissioner Carr, but the commissioner allowed the Bears to keep Savoldi as long as they were willing to pay a fine of $1,000 per game that Savoldi played in. The Bears started Savoldi at the halfback position opposite Red Grange, and in his first game (only ten days after leaving Notre Dame), he scored the only touchdown in a 6–0 victory over Ernie Nevers' Cardinals on Thanksgiving Day in Wrigley Field.

After helping the Bears win their final three games of the season (including a 21–0 upset of Lambeau's Packers on December 7, 1930, at Wrigley Field), Savoldi was invited to re-join his fighting Irish team in a Notre Dame All-Star vs West/South All-Star game in the Los Angeles Coliseum. During the 20–7 victory, Savoldi scored three touchdowns.

== Professional wrestling career ==
Newsreel footage of a professional wrestling match between Man Mountain Dean and "Jumping" Joe Savoldi in Los Angeles in 1934

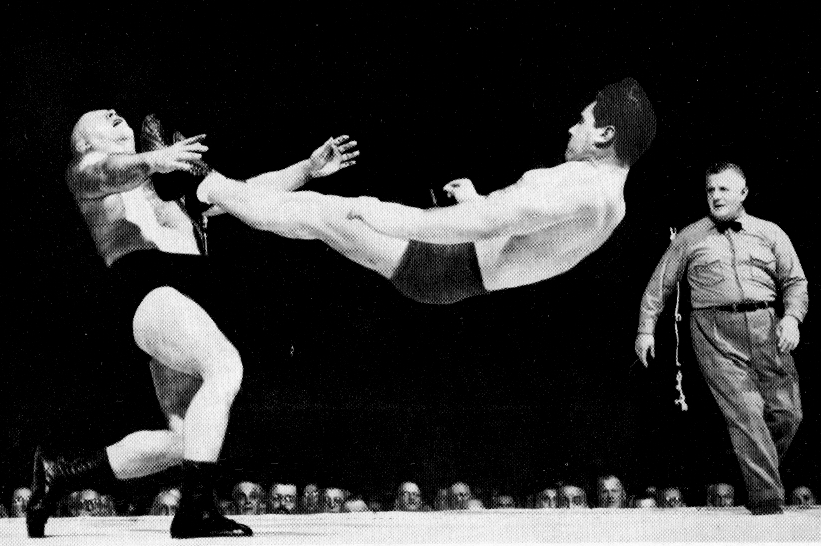
Jumping Joe Savoldi executing a dropkick at Madison Square Garden (1934)

During the All-Star game, he caught the eye of two famous spectators—wrestling promoter Billy Sandow and former world champion Ed "Strangler" Lewis. Savoldi agreed to meet Lewis and Sandow the following day at a local gym, and after an informal tryout in which Strangler Lewis proclaimed Savoldi the strongest man he had ever wrestled, Sandow eventually signed Savoldi to a contract in May 1931. Savoldi's debut match took place in February 1931, wrestling under the management of Puss Halbritter, and before formalizing his contract with Sandow, he appeared in a final charity football game in Kezar Stadium with the Savoldi all-stars.

As a wrestler, Savoldi became known for his finishing move, the flying dropkick (the pro wrestling move known today as simply the "dropkick"). From the early 1930s through the end of his career in 1950, Savoldi was credited as having originated the move but today that attribution is disputed between him and Abe Coleman.

Interpromotional wars were raging at the time, and on April 7, 1933, at Chicago Stadium, Savoldi was involved in a double cross on heavyweight champion Jim Londos. After a tangle by the ropes, referee Bob Managoff declared Savoldi the winner by pinfall and awarded him the title. Vigorous arguments were waged over whether Savoldi had truly won the match, and whether Londos' title had even been on the line. As a result, Savoldi and Managoff were suspended in some territories and the title change was not universally recognized. Londos continued to bill himself as world champion, while Savoldi went to the New York area claiming the same, until he was defeated by Jim Browning on June 12 at Yankee Stadium. After peace was made between rival promotions, a Londos/Savoldi rematch was held at Chicago Stadium on January 31, 1934. Londos won the contest.

Savoldi continued his wrestling career throughout the decade, touring New Zealand in 1936, appearing in Hawaii and Australia in 1937, and spending a lengthy time in Europe shortly before World War II.

== World War II ==
Joe Savoldi
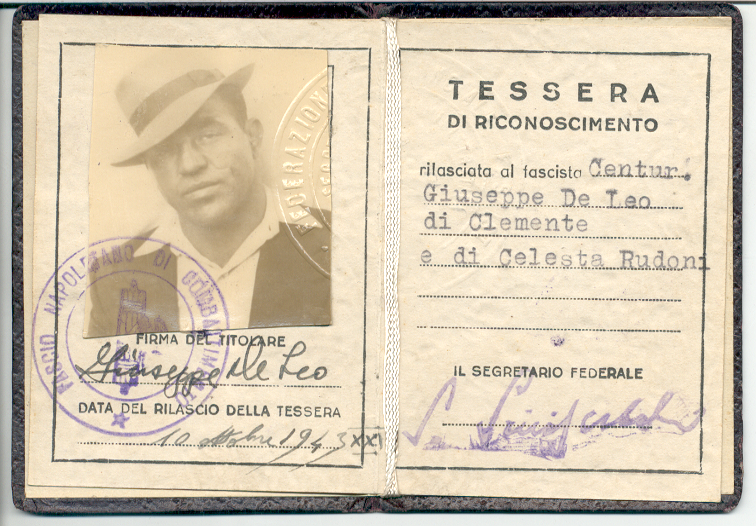
- false ID created by OSS
- Espionage activity
- Country: United States
- Agency: Office of Strategic Services (OSS)
- Service years: 1942–1945
- Codename: Sampson
- Operations: McGregor Project

Savoldi was approached by the U.S. government in 1942 about joining the war effort in an espionage role. He was chosen due to his fluency in multiple dialects of Italian, his expertise in hand-to-hand combat, and his deep knowledge of the Italian geography—including the interior of Benito Mussolini's compound. Savoldi was assigned to the Special Operations branch of the Office of Strategic Services (OSS), with the code name "Sampson". He took part in missions in North Africa, Italy, and France during 1943–1945.

As a member the 2677th Regiment APO 512, Savoldi took part in multiple missions behind enemy lines. His service in Special Operations included at least three successful, high-visibility missions, all within the McGregor Project under the assumed identity of Giuseppe DeLeo. The real Giuseppe DeLeo was a captain in the Italian Army who had been captured in North Africa. The McGregor Project used Savoldi and other Italian and Italian-American contacts to expedite the Italian surrender to the Allies in 1943.

Savoldi's first operation (July–December 1943) was with Lt. Mike Burke, Lt. John Ringling North, and Peter Tompkins. Their mission was to escort Italian-American film producer Marcello Girosi (whose brother Massimo was commander of the Italian Navy) around the Mediterranean theater. Savoldi may have provided security for OSS chief "Wild Bill" Donovan, when he met with General George S. Patton in Palermo on 10 July 1943.

Savoldi's second operation as part of the ongoing McGregor Project was to extract Italian scientist Carlo Calosi from the German-occupied part of Italy. Calosi was the inventor of the highly effective magnetic trigger used in the Silvrifici Italiano Calosi (SIC) torpedo, which the Germans used extensively. Savoldi and colleagues Donald Downes and Andre Pacatte located Calosi in Rome. They moved him, his commander Admiral Minisini, their wives, several technicians, and secret documents on the SIC to the Amalfi Coast, where they were picked up by US forces. Calosi's party went to the US and developed countermeasures against the SIC for the Allies.

During his third major mission, Savoldi worked undercover in Naples, where he infiltrated the local Camorra and helped break up one of the largest black market operations in all of Italy. While undercover, Savoldi again assumed the identity of Giuseppe De Leo, but he worked in civilian clothing, posing as a rogue operator. Savoldi spoke Italian in several dialects as well as French, Spanish, and some German, and his dangerous work behind enemy lines was highly regarded according to several, now declassified, documents.

The 1946 book Cloak and Dagger by Alastair MacBain and Corey Ford includes an entire chapter titled "The Saga of Jumping Joe", recounting Savoldi's participation in the McGregor Project. The book was later adapted to film under the same title, Cloak and Dagger starring Gary Cooper. Savoldi's friend, former OSS agent, E. Michael Burke acted as technical advisor. A 1950 NBC radio show of the same title based on Ford and MacBain's book lasted 26 episodes.

== Retirement ==
Savoldi resumed his wrestling career before war's end, but his ability to move around in the ring would begin to diminish due to the onset of arthritis. He tried promoting in the Chicago area for a while between 1946 and 1948, and is credited with nicknaming and training the first African-American pro wrestling champion Bobo Brazil. Savoldi returned to the ring for a couple more years, wrestling his final match in 1950. He then went back to university to work towards earning his qualifications for a teacher's degree, and eventually started a program to mentor hard-to-reach kids before becoming a full-time science teacher at Henderson County High School in Henderson, Kentucky. Savoldi died in 1974 at the age of 65, and is buried in Henderson.

== Other media ==
In October 1931, Savoldi signed a motion picture contract with Hollywood and committed to appear in football and wrestling pictures.

In 1941, he brought a new energy drink to market, called Dropkick, The Drink For "All Americans". Despite excellent pre-sales, including a contract with the University of Notre Dame to feature the drink in their stadium during the 1942 season, the business venture fizzled when the United States entered the war, and the ensuing sugar rationing eliminated his ability to mass-produce the drink.

== Championships and accomplishments ==
- Montreal Athletic Commission
  - World Heavyweight Championship (Montreal version) (1 time)
- National Wrestling Association
  - European Heavyweight Championship (1 time)
- Other titles
  - Rocky Mountain Heavyweight Championship (1 time)

== See also ==
- List of gridiron football players who became professional wrestlers
