= Dropkick =

Professional wrestling attack

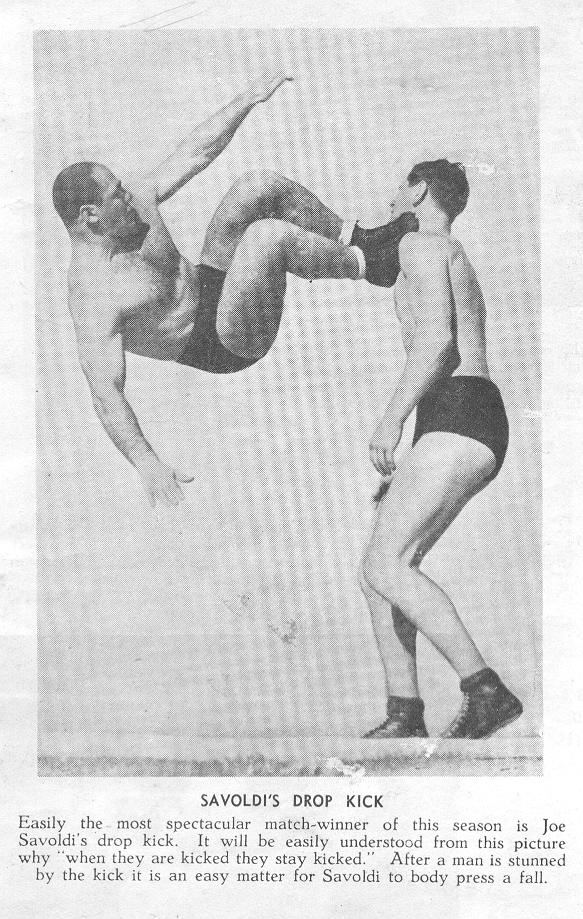
Jumping Joe Savoldi in Australia 1937.

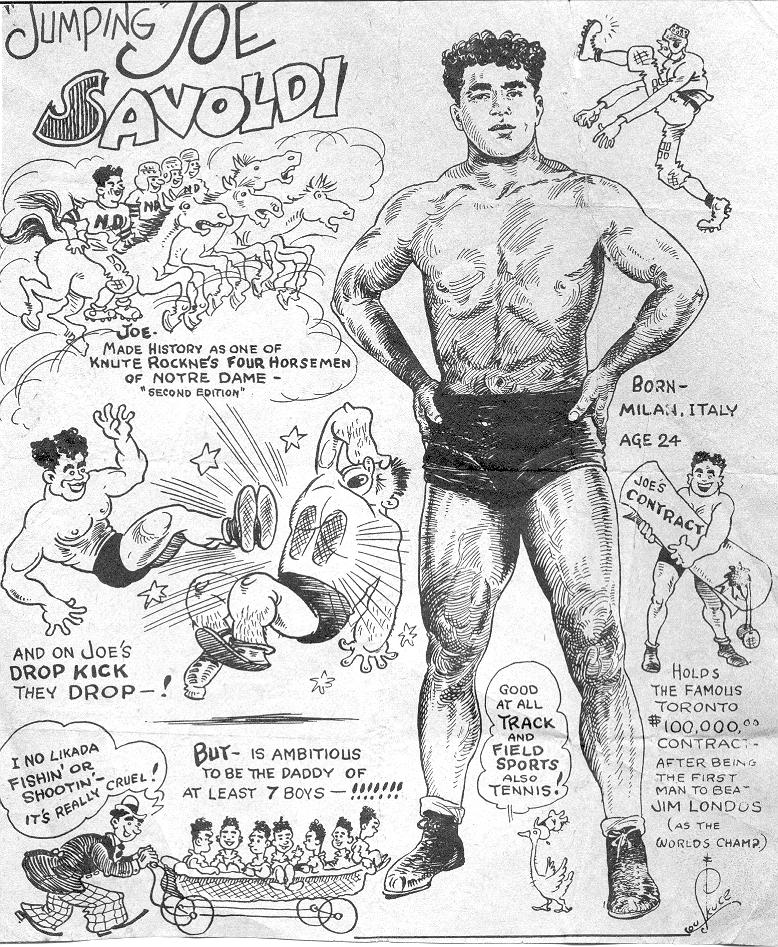
Jumping Joe Savoldi publicity article in 1933.

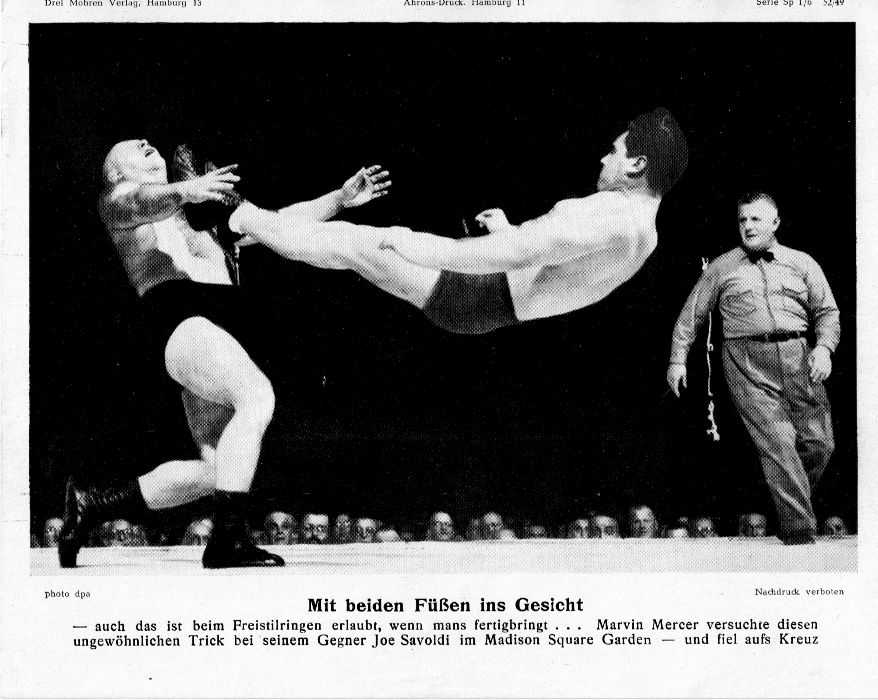
The original dropkick by Jumping Joe Savoldi at Madison Square Garden in 1934.

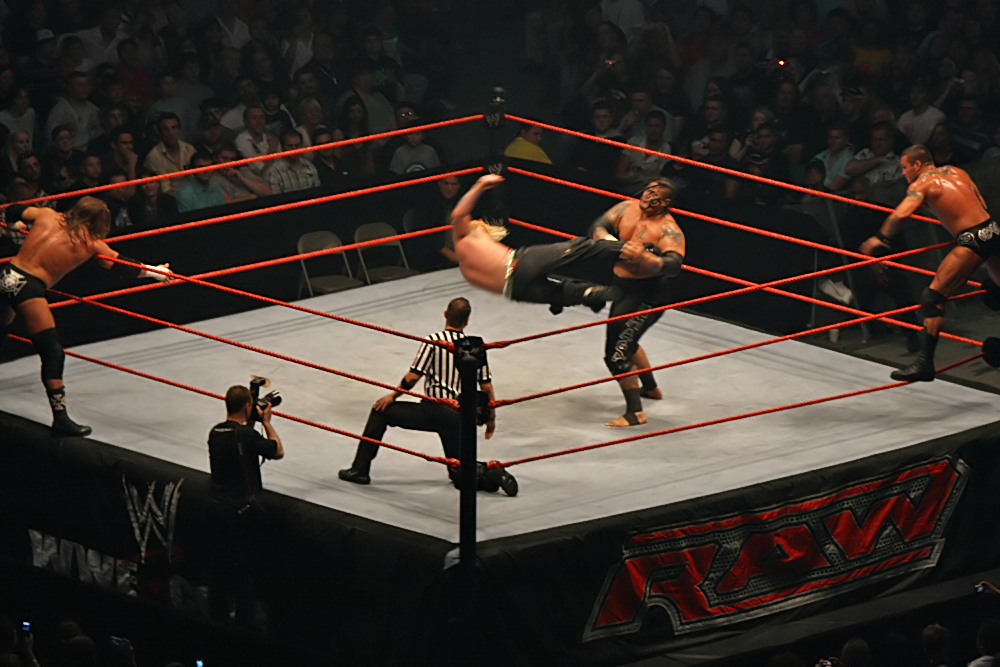
Jeff Hardy performing a dropkick on Umaga during a live show.

A dropkick is an attacking maneuver in professional wrestling. It is defined as an attack where the wrestler jumps up and kicks the opponent with the soles of both feet; this sees the wrestler twist as they jump so that when the feet connect with the opponent one foot is raised higher than the other (depending on which way they twist) and the wrestler falls back to the mat on their side, or front. This is commonly employed by light and nimble wrestlers who can take advantage of their agility, and is often executed on a charging opponent, while charging at an opponent, or a combination of the two.

The most basic form of a dropkick, but potentially the hardest to pull off, is a standing dropkick first used by "Jumping Joe" Savoldi where the wrestler catches a standing or running opponent with a standard dropkick from a standing position. In order to be pulled off effectively, it requires great leg strength in order to gain elevation. Savoldi, a former All-American running back for Knute Rockne at Notre Dame, used his association with football to identify the move as the "drop-kick" and the press also called it a "flying dropkick".

The dropkick in its current form was thought to perhaps originated by "Jumping Joe" Savoldi, although wrestler Abe Coleman, known as "Hebrew Hercules" and "Jewish Cougars", can also be seen in early video using a feet-first dive at an opponent's waist. Coleman, listed at 5'2" in height, called the move a "Kangaroo Kick" and claimed the move was inspired by kangaroos he saw on a tour of Australia in 1930. When Savoldi performed the "drop" kick in 1933, the press simply said it was another name for Coleman's existing "kangaroo" kick specialty.

== Variations ==
There are many variations, including the following.

=== Dropsault ===
Also known as a backflip dropkick, or a moonsault dropkick, this move is an attack where the wrestler jumps up and kicks the opponent with both feet and then executes a backflip, landing on the mat chest-first. This move was popularized by Paul London during his tenure in the WWE and is also used by Matt Sydal and Adam Page. Randy Orton sparingly used this move early in his career; notably once while in OVW and one time later in a WWE dark match, both in 2001.

This move can also be used to each attack both a standing opponent as well as an already supine opponent. The attacker begins with an opponent standing in front of them and a supine horizontal opponent just behind them. The attacker performs the dropsault to strike standing Opponent A. The contact is brief and controlled so the attacker’s rotation continues. Using of momentum and rebound from the on impact from knocking Opponent A back or down, the attacker’s body naturally continues rotating and moving back and downward, redirecting the rotation and trajectory so they land chest or torso across supine Opponent B. Paul London and Adam Page have used this technique. Jack Evans has used a version of this move earlier in his career with both the standing and supine opponents in front of him.

Because the move in general combines a full backward rotation with a striking extension, the dropsault carries significant risk of mis‑timing, under‑rotation, or severe head/neck impact, for the attacker upon failing. Both the attacker must make sure they are agile enough to leap high into the air, while striking the opponent, to push themselves up and away while the opponent must provide a strong standing base to rebound the attack off of them, also pushing up and back to allow the attacker to land safely.

=== Front dropkick ===
Popularized by Jumping Joe Savoldi and Abe Coleman, the front dropkick involves the wrestler jumping kicking forward so that they hit the opponent with the soles of both feet. This enables the wrestler to fall backwards to the mat, landing on their upper back and shoulder area. This is often used to attack lower parts of the opponent than the modern dropkick.

Another variation, known as a shotgun dropkick, sees the wrestler charge from one corner to an opponent standing in the middle of the ring and dropkicking them with such force that it catapults the opponent into the corner. This was popularized in Japan by Takahiro Suwa and Yasushi Kanda before Finn Bálor made it famous in America.

=== Missile dropkick ===
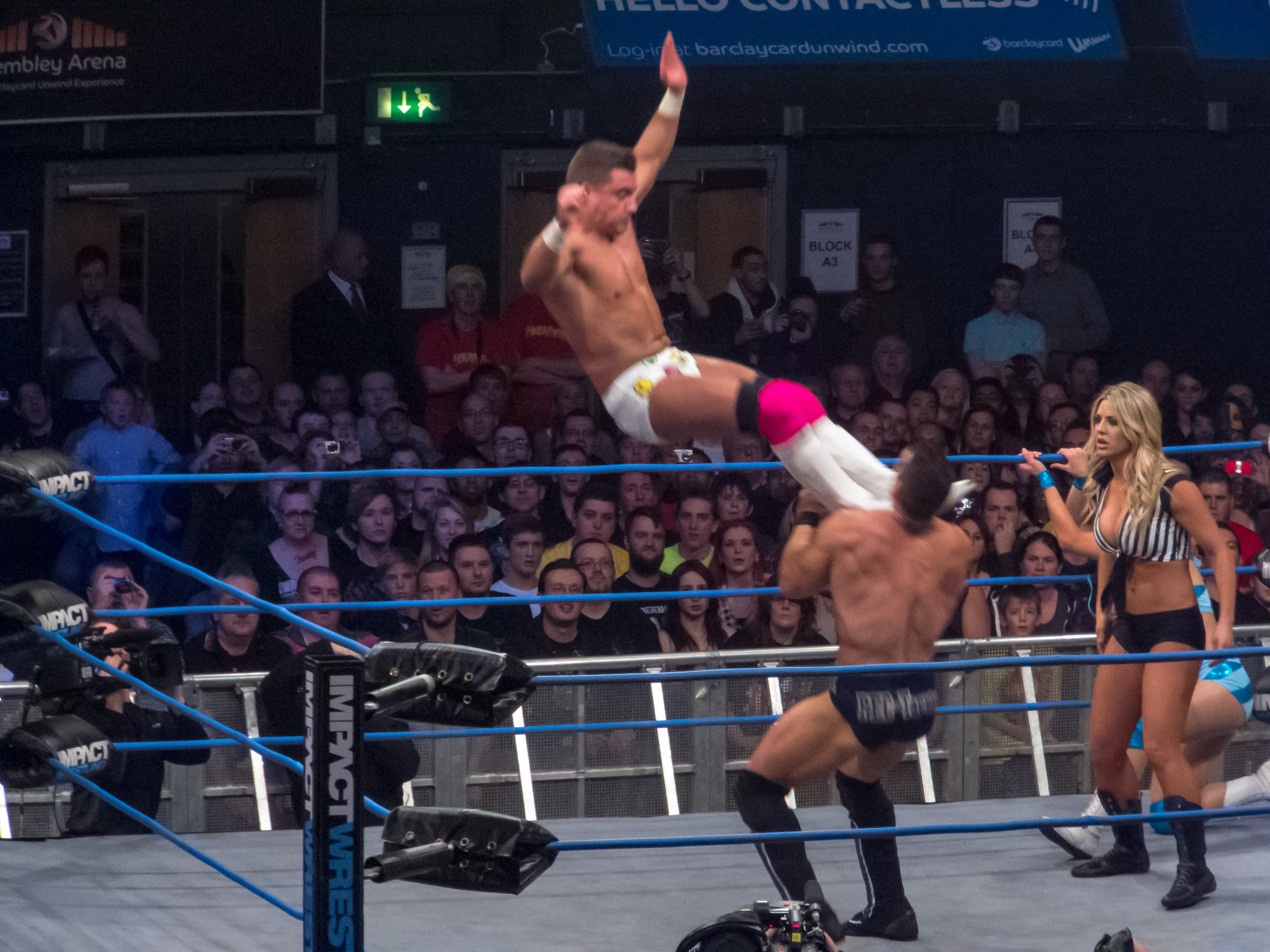
Marty Scurll performs a missile dropkick.

A missile dropkick involves the wrestler jumping off the second or top turnbuckle and performing the dropkick on a standing opponent.

=== Running single leg dropkick ===
In this dropkick an attacking wrestler runs towards an opponent and jumps up sideways striking an opponent's head or chin with the sole of their highest foot, with similar execution as a big boot. A front dropkick variation, in which the attacking wrestler does not twist like in a normal dropkick, is also possible. Drew McIntyre uses this as a finisher and calls it the Claymore. Swerve Strickland also uses this as his finisher called the House Call.

=== Standing dropkick ===
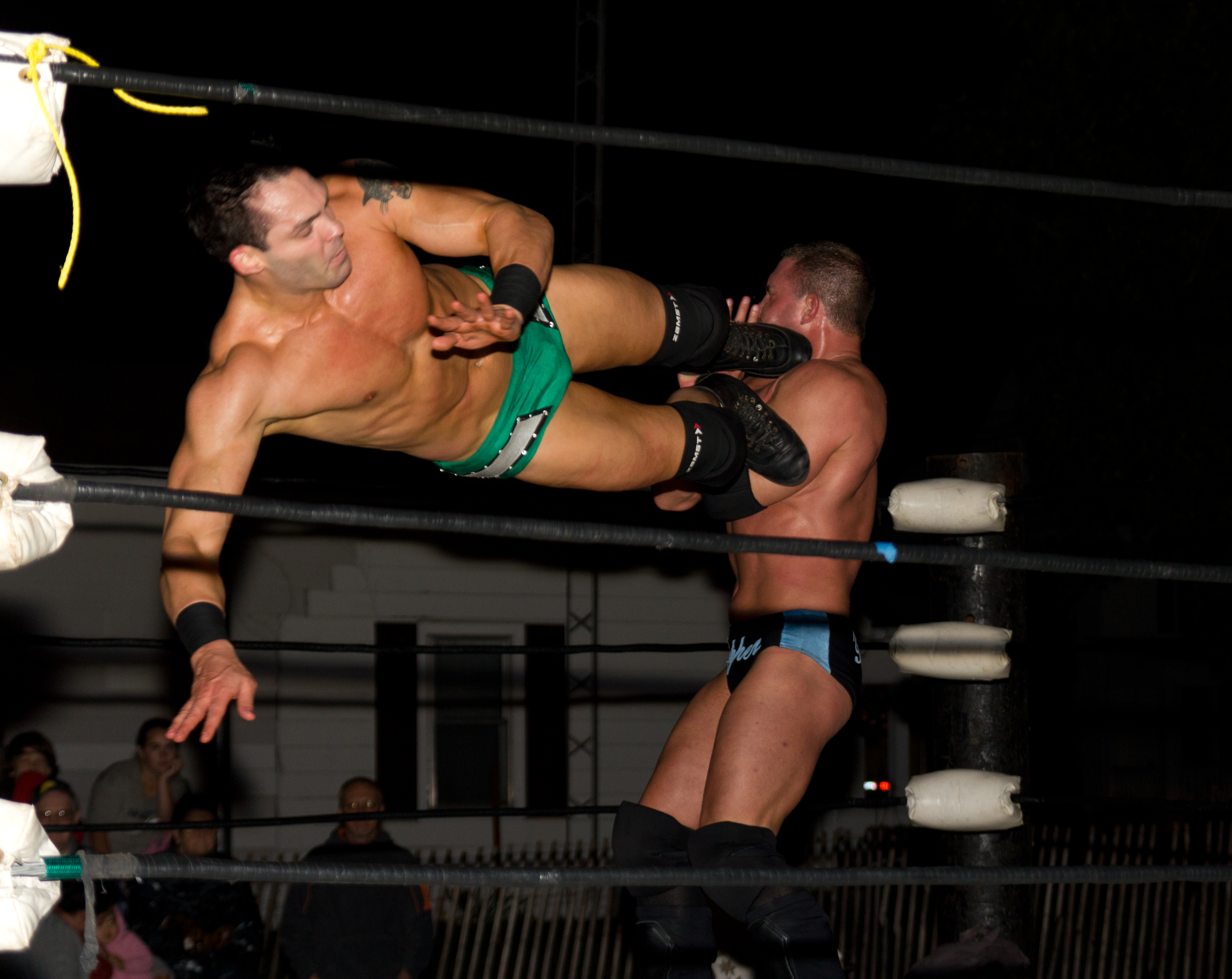
Shawn Spears executing a standing dropkick on Pepper Parks.

In this variation, the wrestler executes a traditional dropkick, but twists their body while performing it in a standing position. There is also a slight variation where the attacker holds on to their opponent by the head with one hand while dropkicking them. This variation was innovated by David Von Erich and popularized by Curt Hennig.

== See also ==
- Double-team dropkicks
- Professional wrestling attacks
- Professional wrestling aerial techniques
