= Man Mountain Dean =

American professional wrestler

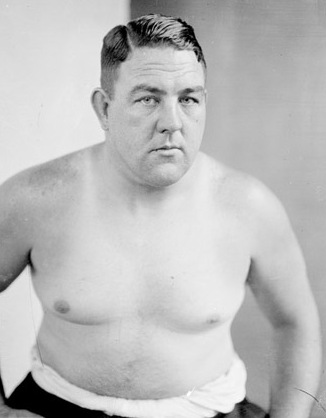
- Wrestler Frank Leavitt, Chicago, Illinois, 1924

Personal information
- Born: Frank Simmons Leavitt; June 30, 1891 New York City, New York, U.S.
- Died: May 29, 1953 (aged 61) Norcross, Georgia, U.S.
- Spouse: Doris Dean

Professional wrestling career
- Ring names: Soldier Leavitt; Hell's Kitchen Bill-Bill; Stone Mountain; Man Mountain Dean
- Billed height: 5 ft 11 in (180 cm)
- Billed weight: 310 lb (141 kg)
- Debut: 1914
- Retired: 1946
- Football career

Profile
- Position: Guard, center

Career history
- New York Brickley Giants (1921)
- Stats at Pro Football Reference

Frank Simmons Leavitt (June 30, 1891 – May 29, 1953) was an American professional wrestler of the early 20th century, known by the ring name Man Mountain Dean.

== Early life ==
Leavitt was born in New York City, the son of John McKenney Leavitt and Henrietta N. (née Decker) Leavitt. From childhood, Leavitt was above average in size and strength. This led to a lifelong interest in competitive sport, and also enabled him to lie about his age in order to join the United States Army at the age of fourteen.

While enlisted he saw duty on the Mexico–United States border with John J. Pershing, and was later sent to France where he participated in combat during World War I. Also during this period (1914) he began his wrestling career using the ring name of "Soldier Leavitt".

== Professional wrestling career ==
After the war, Leavitt embarked on a career in athletics. Although he played guard and center for the New York Brickley Giants of the National Football League (NFL) in 1921, he concentrated most of his efforts on professional wrestling. He competed in the ring for a time under the name "Hell's Kitchen Bill-Bill" (a "hillbilly" reference which was suggested to him by the writer Damon Runyon) but eventually settled on the moniker of "Stone Mountain".

Newsreel footage of a professional wrestling match between Man Mountain Dean and "Jumping" Joe Savoldi in Los Angeles in 1934

Leavitt wrestled with limited success at first, and after an injury took a job in 1925 as a Miami Beach police officer. He worked for the City of Miami Beach Police Department for one year. In 1926 he transferred to the City of Miami Police Department where he became a traffic officer. He was a fixture at his traffic post at East Flagler Street and 2nd Avenue. Starting in 1926, the City of Miami would send Leavitt on summer publicity tours across the United States and Canada to promote Miami. While on his traffic post in Miami he met his wife, Doris Dean Cooper, who also became his manager. In 1930 Leavitt was fired from the police force for visiting Al Capone's residence on Palm Island in Miami Beach. In 1932, at his wife's suggestion, he adopted the nickname "Man Mountain" and substituted the more Anglo-Saxon-sounding last name of Dean. At a stocky 5'11" and weighing over 300 pounds, Dean was an imposing figure. He also grew a long, full beard as part of his ring persona. After a successful wrestling tour of Germany which had been booked by his wife, Doris Dean, he was invited to take a job in the UK as stunt-double for Charles Laughton in the movie The Private Life of Henry VIII. This would be the beginning of a subsidiary movie career for Dean, who would appear in various roles in twelve other movies, playing himself in five of them. One of the movies in which he portrayed himself was the Joe E. Brown comedy The Gladiator, a 1938 adaptation of Philip Gordon Wylie's 1930 novel Gladiator.

Meanwhile, he continued a successful wrestling career, participating altogether in 504 professional bouts; he commanded fees of upwards of $1,500 for each match. In 1940 he retired from the ring to a farm outside of Norcross, Georgia.

Dean ran for a seat in the Georgia House of Representatives in 1938 but withdrew his candidacy, citing discomfort with the political process. During World War II he again joined the Army despite his age, and eventually retired with the rank of master sergeant. In the 1940s he was the First Sergeant of the Military Intelligence Training Center at Camp Ritchie in Maryland, where he instructed soldiers in hand-to-hand combat. Afterward he studied at the University of Georgia's school of journalism. He appeared as a guest on the December 29, 1944 episode of the radio program It Pays to be Ignorant. During the program, broadcast from New York City, Dean gave his weight as 280 pounds (127 kg). Several other wrestlers would go on to use the "Man Mountain Dean Jr." and "Man Mountain" moniker, including Man Mountain Mike, Man Mountain Link and Man Mountain Rock.

== Death ==
Dean died of a heart attack in his home in Norcross, Georgia, aged 61, in 1953, and is buried in Marietta National Cemetery under a military marker bearing his birth name and an erroneous year of birth (1889) that likely represents the year Dean put when he joined the Army.

== Filmography ==
Year	Title	Role	Notes
1935	Reckless	Himself	
1935	We're in the Money	Himself	
1935	Cappy Ricks Returns	One of Bill's Men	Uncredited
1937	Three Legionnaires	Ivan	
1937	Big City	Himself	
1938	The Gladiator	Himself	
1949	Mighty Joe Young	Strongman	Uncredited, (final film role)

== Championships and accomplishments ==
- Professional Wrestling Hall of Fame and Museum
  - Class of 2021
- Southern California Pro-Wrestling Hall of Fame
  - Inducted 2017

Dean and his life story was featured in the June 2022 edition of Sports Illustrated under the title "The Classified Case of the Pro Wrestler Who Helped Beat the Nazis" and primarily examined his time as a trainer at Camp Ritchie.
