= Pacific Coast Light Heavyweight Championship =

American Pacific Northwest wrestling championship

The Pacific Coast Light Heavyweight Championship was a professional wrestling championship that was contended for in the Pacific Northwest from the 1920s to the mid-1950s.

== Title history ==
Silver areas in the history indicate periods of unknown lineage.

Wrestler:	Times:	Date:	Location:	Notes:
Milton Harnden	1	February 14, 1917	Bellingham, WA	Defeats Owen Dailey
Paul Poulos	1	February 11, 1922	Ukiah, Ca	Defeats Adolph Borgstrom
Ted Thye	1	Circa 1924		
Billy Meeske	1	January 15, 1926	Portland, OR	Defeats Mike Yokel
Billy Edwards	1	February 18, 1926	Portland, OR	
Fred Bruno	1	April 16, 1934	Portland, OR	Defeats George Dussette
Jack Lipscomb	1	December 10, 1936	Eugene, OR	Defeats Walter Achieu
George Wagner	1	May 19, 1938	Eugene, OR	Defeats Pat O'Dowdy.
Bulldog Jackson	1	February 16, 1939	Eugene, OR	
Eddie Roberts	1	1939		
Bulldog Jackson	2	July 27, 1939	Eugene, OR	
Ernie Piluso	1	39		
Pete Belcastro	1	January 1, 1940	Eugene, OR	
Prince Ilaki	1	February 29, 1940	Eugene, OR	
Herb Parks	1	May 9, 1940	Eugene, OR	
Billy McEuin	1	June 12, 1941	Eugene, OR	
Jack Kiser	1	1941		
George Wagner	2	August 4, 1941	Eugene, OR	
Jack Lipscomb	2	April 30, 1942	Eugene, OR	Defeats Milt Olsen
Milt Olsen	1	May 21, 1942	Eugene, OR	
Jack Lipscomb	3	About 1943		
George Wagner	3	May 10, 1943		
Tony Ross	1	July 10, 1943	Eugene, OR	
George Wagner	4	November 1, 1943	Eugene, OR	
Tonn Ross	2	November 30, 1943	Eugene, OR	
Jack Kiser	2	August 22, 1944	Salem, OR	Defeats Paavo Ketonnen
Paavo Ketonnen	1	July 28, 1945	Eugene, OR	
Jack Lipscomb	4	July 30, 1945	Portland, OR	Defeats George Dussette
Joe Lynam	1	December 10, 1945	Portland, OR	
Jack Lipscomb	5	January 1946		
Joe Lynam	2	January 21, 1946	Portland, OR	
Paavo Ketonnen	2	Before May 1946		
Al Szasz	1	May 6, 1946	Portland, OR	
Paavo Ketonnen	3	1946		
Billy Goelz	1			
The Gray Mask	1	February 3, 1947	Eugene, OR	
Billy Hickson	1	1947		
Gypsy Joe Dorsetti	1	January 20, 1948	Eugene, OR	
Gordon Hessel	1	March 23, 1948	Eugene, OR	
Tex Hager	1	1948		
Jack O'Reilly	1	January 15, 1949		
Ben Sherman	1	March 5, 1949	Eugene, OR	
Buck Weaver	1	March 26, 1949		
Jack O'Reilly	2	January 1, 1950	Portland, OR	
Eddie Williams	1	June 16, 1950	Portland, OR	
Fred Mitchell	1			
Andy Tremaine	1	1952		
Masked Marvel (Buddy Knox)	1	1952		
Roger Mackay	1			
Frank Stojack	1	1953		
Danny McShain	1			
Frank Stojack	2			Recognition withdrawn in Portland
Carl Engstrom	1	54		
Buddy Knox	2	March 24, 1954		
Frank Stojack	3			
Jack Kiser	3	before October 1954		
