= Cyclone Mackey =

American professional wrestler

Personal information
- Born: Corbin James Massey; July 19, 1903 Missouri, United States
- Died: December 30, 1979 (aged 76) Los Angeles, California, United States

Professional wrestling career
- Ring name(s): Ciclón McKey; Ciclón Mackey; Corbin MacKey; Corbin Massey; Cyclone Mackey; Cy Mackey; The Gray Mask; John Mackey; La Maravilla Enmascarada; Mask Mackey; Mr. The Mysterious X The Yellow Mask
- Billed weight: 160 lb (73 kg)
- Billed from: Los Angeles, California, US; Amarillo, Texas, US; Galveston, Texas, US; Houston, Texas, US; San Antonio, Texas, US; Ireland
- Trained by: Cal Farley; Dutch Mantell (Note: Not the modern day wrestler known as Dutch Mantel.)
- Debut: 1930
- Retired: 1951

Corbin James Massey (July 19, 1903 – December 30, 1979) was an American professional wrestler known under a number of ring names such as Cyclone Mackey, Ciclón McKey, La Maravilla Enmascarada, Mr. X, The Grey Mask and The Yellow Mask. Massey was the first wrestler to work masked in Mexico as the enmascarado character La Maravilla Enmascarada (Spanish for "The Masked Marvel") and helped starting the tradition of masks in Lucha libre that still exists today. Massey was one of many wrestlers who used the name "Masked Marvel" during the early days of wrestling. During his career he held both the World Light Heavyweight Championship twice and the Pacific Coast Light Heavyweight Championship, both while working as "Grey Mask".

== Professional wrestling career (1930–1951) ==
Corbin Massey was trained for his professional wrestling career by Cal Farley and Alfred Albert Joe de Re la Gardiur. Massey took the ring name "Cyclone Mackey" due to his fast moves inside the ring early on. He made his debut in 1930 and initially worked for Al Haft's Midwest Wrestling Association in Ohio. In 1931 and 1932 he worked throughout Texas after he moved there and bought a house. In June, 1933 he received a match against Yaqui Joe for the World Middleweight Championship, but it was decided to not make him the champion.

=== Mexico (1933–1936) ===
While Massey was working in Texas, Mexican wrestling promoter Salvador Lutteroth saw him in action and invited Mackey to compete for his newly created Empresa Mexicana de Lucha Libre (EMLL). Working under the name "Cíclon MacKey" he wrestled on EMLL's first show, which took place in Arena Moreno in Mexico City. On the show Mackey lost to Liong Tin Kit. A year later Mackey would help make Lucha libre history as he started to wrestle in a mask under the name La Maravilla Enmascarada ("The Masked Marvel"). While masked wrestlers had competed in the United States for a number of years, including several "Masked Marvels", this would be the first masked wrestler in Mexico. The colorful mask and the imagery of the masked warrior soon became a fundamental part of Lucha Libre based on the work of La Maravilla Enmascarada, El Enmascarado ("The Masked Man"), El Enmascarado de Chicago and El Murciélago Enmascarado ("The Masked Bat"). The tradition of the mask would rise to take a "sacred" place, with the majority of all Mexican wrestlers starting out as masked wrestlers. La Maravilla Enmascarada made his in-ring debut at the EMLL 1st Anniversary Show defeating Frank Gou in three falls. Two years later, at the EMLL 3rd Anniversary Show he defeated Bobby Pearce. in late 1936 Mackey stopped working in Mexico, moving to territories in California instead.

=== Mr. X (1936–1940) ===
After Massey moved to California he began working as "Mr. X", another masked character which, like the Masked Marvel, was an identity used by many wrestlers both before and after Massey used it. At times he was billed as the "Mysterious X", but it was the same mask and character he played. Playing a masked character he was able to work two separate characters, the heel (wrestling term for those that play the "bad guy" role) Mr. X and the face ("Good guy") character Cyclone Mackey without the public being aware that they were one and the same. In 1940 Mackey was unmasked, taking off the Mr. X mask as a result of losing a match to Gil LaCross and Paul Orth. After he was unmasked he resumed using the Cyclone Mackey ring name.

=== Gray Mask (1943–1949) ===
Over the years the Cyclone Mackey style of wrestling took its toll on Massey's body and he had to adopt a slower, more brawling style. To fit the style he developed a masked heel character called "The Grey Mask" as he wrestled in California. As the Gray Mask he defeated Wild Red Berry to win the National Wrestling Association's World Light Heavyweight Championship on December 27, 1943. As the champion he toured the West Coast defending the championship several times, including a successful defense against Frankie Hart in Eugene, Oregon. He later lost the championship to Gorilla Ramos on March 13, but regained it two weeks later. His second run as the champion was ended by Wild Red Berry on April 24. The Grey Mask was such a despised wrestling character that he would occasionally incite a riot in the arena, with the fans trying to attack him. In 1944 he moved on to Don Owen's Pacific Northwest Wrestling (PNW) promotion based in Portland, Oregon, where he also worked as The Gray Mask. During his time in PNW he faced a young George Wagner, before he adopted his famous "Gorgeous George" character. On February 3, 1947, he defeated Billy Goelz to win the Pacific Coast Light Heavyweight Championship, a title he would later lose to Billy Hickson. He would later do double duty in PNW as well, working as Cyclone Mackey once more while also making appearances as the Gray Mask.

=== Final years (1950–1951) ===
In the early 1950s Massey worked less and less, adopting another masked character known as "The Yellow Mask" as well as a run as the masked Mr. X once more

== Retirement and death ==
Corbin Massey retired from wrestling around 1951–1952 and died on December 30, 1979, at the age of 76.

== Championships and accomplishments ==
- National Wrestling Association
  - World Light Heavyweight Championship (2 times)
- Pacific Northwest Wrestling
  - Pacific Coast Light Heavyweight Championship (1 time)

== Luchas de Apuestas record ==
Winner (wager)	Loser (wager)	Location	Event	Date	Notes
Gil LaCross and Paul Orth (hair)	Mr. X (mask) and Tex Hagar	Lima, Ohio	Live event	April 9, 1940	(Note: Only Mr. X's mask was on the line in the match.)
