= Harry Elliott (wrestler) =

American businessperson (1904 – 2006)

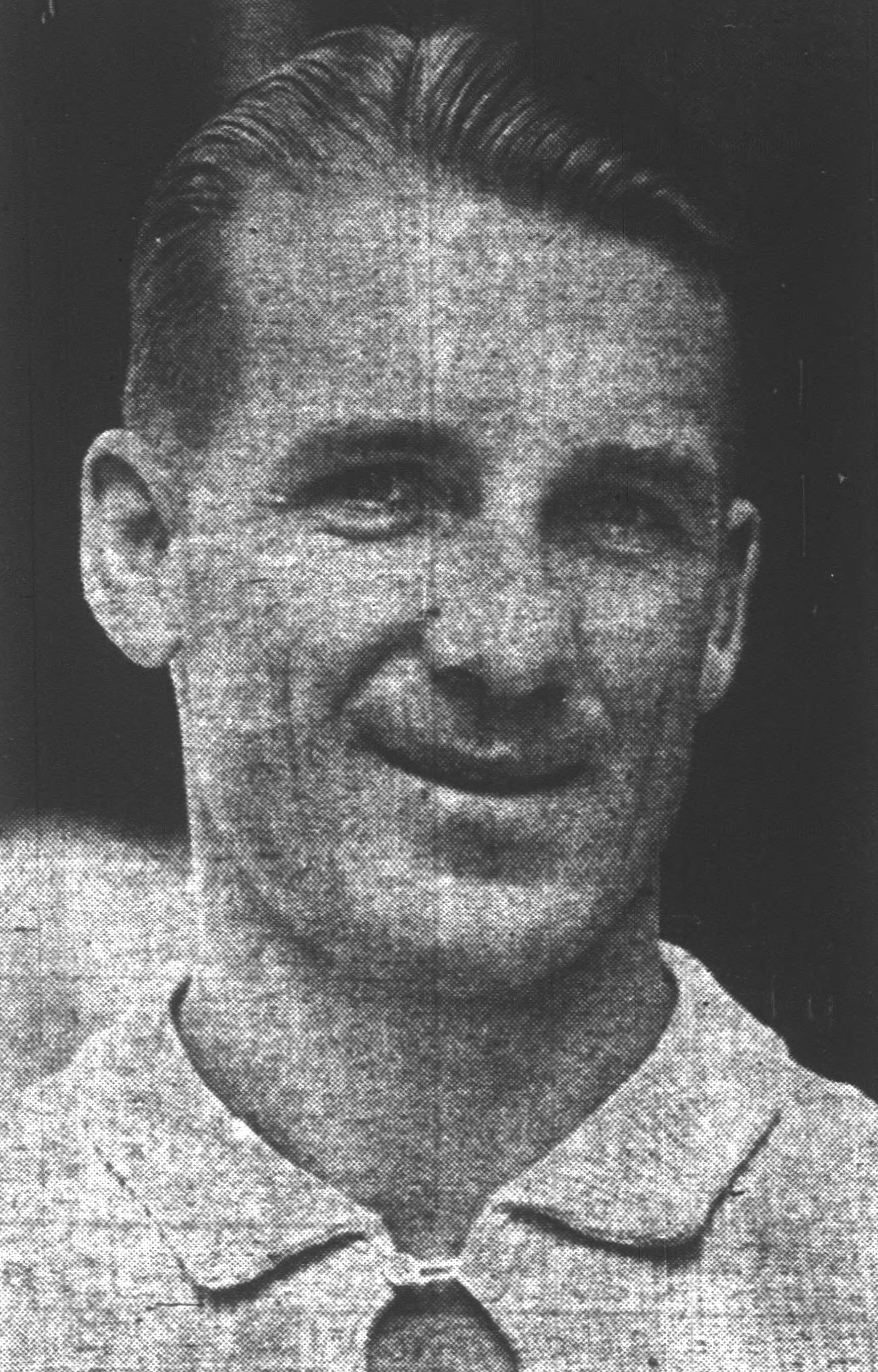

Personal information
- Born: John Harrison Elliott; August 16, 1904 Shreveport, Louisiana, U.S.
- Died: June 25, 2006 (aged 101) Portland, Oregon, U.S.

Professional wrestling career
- Debut: c. 1920s
- Retired: c. 1950s

John Harrison "Harry" Elliott (August 16, 1904 – June 25, 2006) was an American professional wrestler, and promoter. He is the oldest wrestler to have ever lived, at 101 years and 313 days.

== Career ==
Elliott started out as a wrestler in Oregon in the 1930s. He retired from wrestling in the 1950s.

From 1958 to 1969, he was the sole promoter in Washington, Idaho, and Northeast Oregon, promoting Seattle wrestling.

== Personal life ==
Elliott died on June 25, 2006, at 101 years old, making him the oldest wrestler to have ever lived.

== See also ==
- List of oldest surviving professional wrestlers
