= KY Wakamatsu =

Japanese professional wrestler and judoka

Personal information
- Born: Ichimasa Wakamatsu; January 1, 1942 (age 84) Hakodate, Hokkaido, Japan

Professional wrestling career
- Ring name(s): General KY Wakamatsu; Ichimasa Wakamatsu; KY Wakamatsu; Shogun KY Wakamatsu
- Billed height: 180 cm (5 ft 11 in)
- Billed weight: 105 kg (231 lb)
- Trained by: IWE Dojo
- Debut: 29 September 1973
- Retired: 2 September 2023

Ichimasa Wakamatsu (若松市政, Wakamatsu Ichimasa; born January 1, 1942), is a Japanese retired professional wrestler, manager, promoter and actor. He is best known for his tenures in International Wrestling Enterprise (IWE), New Japan Pro Wrestling (NJPW), Super World of Sports (SWS) and Stampede Wrestling in Canada. Wakamatsu managed many wrestlers during his career including, most notably, the heel stable The Machine Gun Army (Giant Machine, Strong Machine and Super Machine). According to Dave Meltzer, Wakamatsu was the most famous manager in Japanese professional wrestling during the 1980s wrestling boom.

Although retiring as a full-time pro wrestler in 1984, Wakamatsu continued to make occasional in-ring appearances well into the late-2010s. He was a regular fixture on the Japanese independent circuit with brief stints in Frontier Martial-Arts Wrestling, Michinoku Pro Wrestling and WRESTLE-1. On September 2, 2023, Wakamatsu wrestled a three-way match and a battle royal in what would be his retirement match. He is the oldest male wrestler to ever wrestle at 81 years.

== Career ==
Wakamatsu began his pro wrestling career at 31 years old in 1973 for International Wrestling Enterprise where he worked there until the promotion folded in 1981.

In 1982, he made his debut in North America for Stampede Wrestling in Calgary, Alberta where he mainly managed Bad News Allen. He was known for hitting his opponents with his kendo stick. In 1985, he began managing Andre the Giant, later Giant Machine, for New Japan Pro Wrestling. He subsequently formed The Machine Gun Army with Giant Machine, Strong Machine and Super Machine. One of the group's high points occurred when Giant Machine won a pinfall victory over Antonio Inoki under Wakamatsu's management, reportedly Inoki's first loss via pinfall in almost seven years. In 1987, Wakamatsu was fourth runner-up for WON Manager of the Year, losing out to Jim Cornette, and was considered the most famous manager in Japanese pro wrestling during the 1980s according to Dave Meltzer of the Wrestling Observer.

From 1990 to 1992 he worked for Super World of Sports as manager of the Geki Dojo stable. Wakamatsu and The Great Kabuki appeared in the 1991 Japanese comedy-science fiction film Kunoichi senshi ninja (Kunoichi Soldiers: The Ninja Warriors) with Tetsuro Tamba. Throughout the decades he managed, refereed and promoted on the Japanese independent circuit.

On February 15, 2019 Wakamatsu teamed with Great Kojika and Kim Duk in a losing effort against Heisei Ishingun (Shiro Koshinaka, Masashi Aoyagi and Akitoshi Saito) at Keiji Muto Produce Pro-Wrestling Masters, a WRESTLE-1 television special held at Korakuen Hall.

On September 2, 2023, Wakamatsu became the oldest male wrestler to fight at 81 years old, 244 days; he wrestled in two events that day for Asian Pro Wrestling in Yubetsu, Japan. In the first match, he defeated Animal Warrior and Agu in a three-way bout, and the second match was for a battle royal won by Agu.

== Filmography ==
Film appearances
Year	Title	Role	Notes	Ref.
1991	Kunoichi senshi ninja			

== See also ==
- Professional wrestling in Japan
