= Frank Gou =

American professional wrestler

Frank Gou was an American professional wrestler that most notably took part in the EMLL 1st Anniversary Show on September 21, 1934. During the event he was defeated by La Maravilla Enmascarada,

Gou continued to wrestle in Mexico throughout the 1930s, including a loss to Tony Canales in 1935. Gou's last recorded match took place on January 1, 1940, at a Wrestling In Guadalajara event, where he was defeated by Luis Robles.
