= The Gladiator (1938 film) =

1938 film directed by Edward Sedgwick

- Theatrical release poster
- Directed by: Edward Sedgwick
- Written by: Arthur Sheekman; Charlie Melson
- Based on: Gladiator by Philip Wylie
- Produced by: David L. Loew; Edward Gross (assistant producer)
- Starring: Joe E. Brown; Man Mountain Dean; Dickie Moore; June Travis; Robert Kent
- Cinematography: George Schneiderman
- Edited by: Robert O. Crandall (as Robert Crandall)
- Music by: Victor Young (uncredited)
- Production company: David L. Loew Productions
- Distributed by: Columbia Pictures
- Release date: August 15, 1938
- Running time: 72 minutes
- Country: United States
- Language: English

The Gladiator is a 1938 American fantasy comedy film directed by Edward Sedgwick and starring Joe E. Brown, Dickie Moore and June Travis. The movie is an adaptation of Philip Gordon Wylie's 1930 novel Gladiator, which is often credited with having influenced the creation of Superman.

== Plot ==
Hugo Kipp, a man, upon returning to college is invited into playing for the football team. He is considered a loser on the team, until an professor Danner send him a drug that gives him super strength.

After the formula turns him into a campus hero, Hugo Kipp enters a wrestling ring against Man Mountain Dean to raise money for an orphanage. He finds out too late that the serum is only temporary, losing his strength with the match in progress. Only a few lucky moves enable Hugo to win the match.

== Cast ==
Main cast

- Joe E. Brown as Hugo Kipp
- Dickie Moore as Bobby
- Man Mountain Dean as Himself
- June Travis as Iris Bennett
- Lucien Littlefield as Professor Danner
- Ethel Wales as Mrs. Danner
- Robert Kent as Tom Dixon
- Donald Douglas as Coach Robbins

Uncredited appearances

- Richard Alexander as Tough Guy
- William Gould as Professor
- Harrison Greene as Trophy Giver / Jokester
- Sam Hayes as Announcer
- Eddie Kane as "Speed" Burns
- Marjorie Kane as Miss Taylor, Student
- Milton Kibbee as Assistant Coach
- Wright Kramer as Dr. DeRay
- Edward LeSaint as Committee Member
- Frank Mills as Man In Movie Audience
- Jack Mulhall as Spectator At Wrestling Match
- Lee Phelps as Coach Stetson
- Harry Semels as Hamburger Man
- John Shelton as Student
- Charles Sullivan as Football Fan
- Charles C. Wilson as Theatre Manager
- Robert Winkler

== Production ==
The film reached theatres two months after the publication of the first appearance of Superman in a comic book.

There is a famous publicity picture of Brown lifting Man Mountain Dean over his head with only one hand. By bracing himself, Brown did it effortlessly on the first try. But when the director called for a retake shot, Brown suffered a hernia and was rushed to the hospital.

== See also ==
- List of American football films
