= EMLL 3rd Anniversary Show =

Mexican Professional wrestling show

- Promotion: Empresa Mexicana de Lucha Libre
- Date: September 27, 1936
- City: Mexico City, Mexico
- Venue: Arena Nacional

EMLL Anniversary Shows chronology
← Previous; 2nd Anniversary	Next → 4th Anniversary

The EMLL 3rd Anniversary Show (Spanish: 3. Aniversario de EMLL) was a professional wrestling major show event produced by Empresa Mexicana de Lucha Libre (EMLL, later renamed Consejo Mundial de Lucha Libre, CMLL) that took place on September 27, 1936, in Arena Nacional, EMLL's main venue at the time located in Mexico City, Mexico. The event commemorated the third anniversary of EMLL, which would become the oldest still active professional wrestling promotion in the world. The Anniversary show is EMLL's biggest show of the year, their Super Bowl event. The EMLL Anniversary Show series is the longest-running annual professional wrestling show, starting in 1934.

== Production ==
=== Background ===
The 1936 Anniversary show commemorated the 3rd anniversary of the Mexican professional wrestling company Empresa Mexicana de Lucha Libre (Spanish for "Mexican Wrestling Promotion"; EMLL) holding their first show on September 22, 1933, by promoter and founder Salvador Lutteroth. EMLL was rebranded early in 1992 to become Consejo Mundial de Lucha Libre ("World Wrestling Council"; CMLL) signal their departure from the National Wrestling Alliance. With the sales of the Jim Crockett Promotions to Ted Turner in 1988 EMLL became the oldest, still-operating wrestling promotion in the world. Over the years EMLL/CMLL has on occasion held multiple shows to celebrate their anniversary but since 1977 the company has only held one annual show, which is considered the biggest show of the year, CMLL's equivalent of WWE's WrestleMania or their Super Bowl event. CMLL has held their Anniversary show at Arena México in Mexico City, Mexico since 1956, the year the building was completed, over time Arena México earned the nickname "The Cathedral of Lucha Libre" due to it hosting most of EMLL/CMLL's major events since the building was completed. EMLL held their first anniversary show at Arena Modelo in 1933 and returned to that building in 1937 through 1943. From 1934 through 1936 EMLL rented Arena Nacional for their shows, but in 1944 they began holding their anniversary shows at Arena Coliseo, an arena they owned. From 1944 through 1955 EMLL held all their anniversary shows at Arena Coliseo. Traditionally EMLL/CMLL holds their major events on Friday Nights, replacing their regularly scheduled Super Viernes show.

=== Storylines ===
The event featured six professional wrestling matches with different wrestlers involved in pre-existing scripted feuds, plots and storylines. Wrestlers were portrayed as either heels (referred to as rudos in Mexico, those that portray the "bad guys") or faces (técnicos in Mexico, the "good guy" characters) as they followed a series of tension-building events, which culminated in a wrestling match or series of matches. Due to the nature of keeping mainly paper records of wrestling at the time no documentation has been found for some of the matches of the show.

== Event ==
Unlike most of the early Anniversary shows records of all six anniversary show matches have been found. In the opening match of the show American Bobby Pearce defeated Mexican wrestler Rojo Enigma ("Red Enigma") in the first of two matches Pearce worked that night. Maravilla Enmascarada, ("The Masked Marvel"), a wrestler who wore a black leather mask while wrestling, was the first masked wrestler in Mexico, starting a tradition in Lucha Libre where the mask plays a significant part of the culture. Maravilla Enmascarada defeated Bobby Pearce in the second match of the night. The third match of the night saw Pocho Aguirre defeat Ben Ali Mar Allah, Ali Mar Allah played a Sheikh character, enhancing his middle eastern heritage. In the fourth match Mexican Chimuelo Campos defeated the Greek wrestler Jimmy el Apolo. In the semi main event Asian Chong Yip defeated local hero Bobby Bonales. The main event match saw Zimba Parka from Moreno, Jalisco defeated Tuffy Klein

== Results ==
No.	Results	Stipulations
1	Bobby Pearce defeated Roja Enigma	Singles match
2	La Maravilla Enmascarada defeated Bobby Pearce	Singles match
3	Pocho Aguirre defeated Ben Ali Mar Allah	Singles match
4	Chimuelo Campos defeated Jimmy el Apolo	Singles match
5	Chong Yip defeated Bobby Bonales	Singles match
6	Zimba Parka defeated Tuffy Klein	Two-out-of-three falls match
