= Abe Coleman =

Polish professional wrestler, promoter and referee

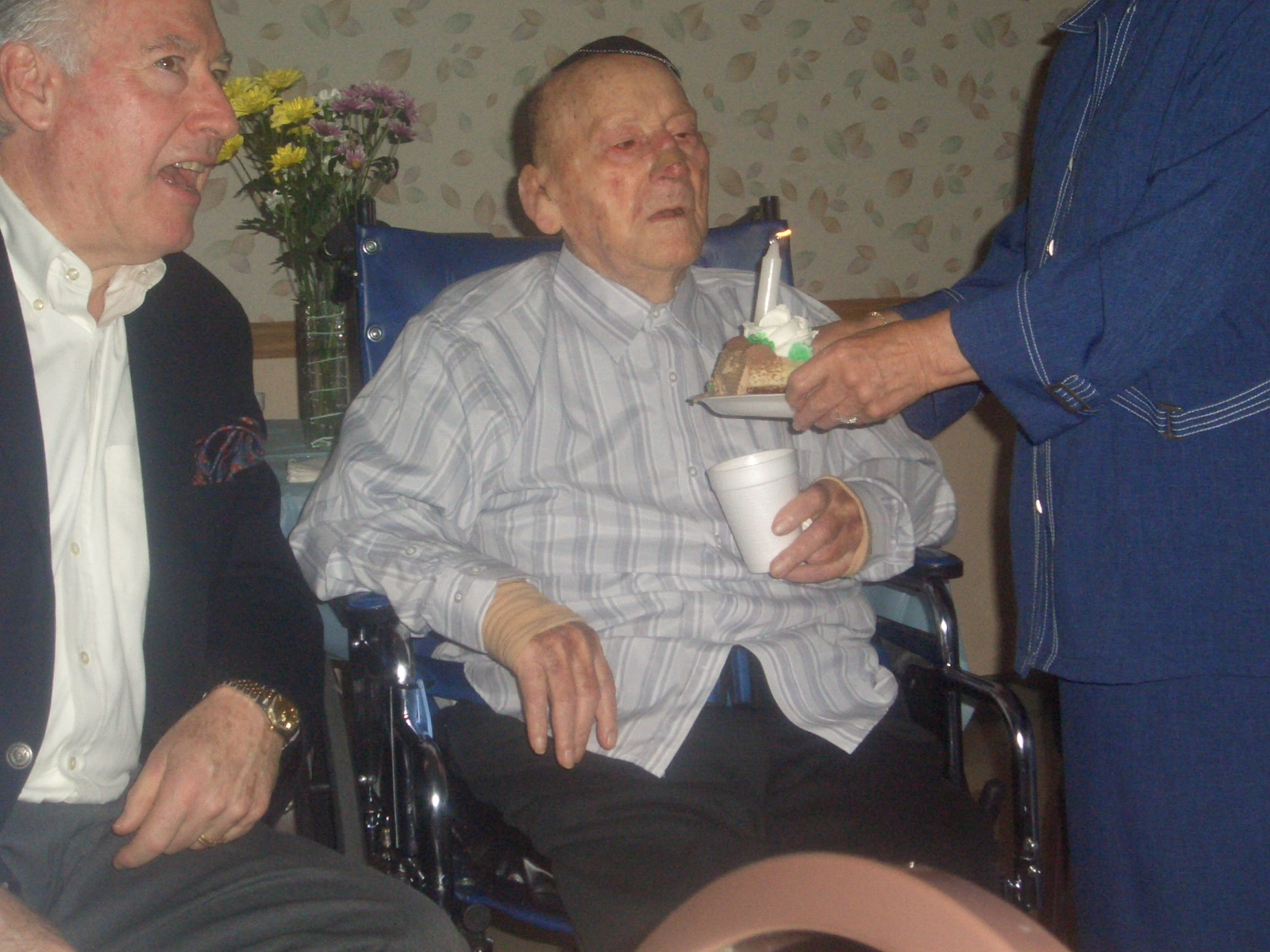
- Abe Coleman at his 100th birthday party on September 18, 2005

Personal information
- Born: Abe Kelmer; September 20, 1905 Żychlin, Congress Poland, Russian Empire (now Poland)
- Died: March 28, 2007 (aged 101) Queens, New York, U.S.
- Spouse: June Miller (m. 1939; died 1987)

Professional wrestling career
- Ring name(s): Abe Coleman; Hebrew Hercules; Jewish Tarzan; Little Hercules
- Billed height: 5 ft 3 in (1.60 m)
- Billed weight: 220 lb (100 kg)
- Billed from: Los Angeles, California
- Debut: 1927
- Retired: 1961

Abe Kelmer / Abba Kelmer (September 20, 1905 – March 28, 2007) was a Polish professional wrestler, promoter and referee, known by the ring names Abe Coleman, Hebrew Hercules, and Jewish Tarzan. At the time of his death, Coleman was believed to be the oldest professional wrestler in the world, and the only known wrestler to live past the age of 100 years.

== Early life ==
Kelmer was born to a Jewish family in Żychlin, Congress Poland in 1905. His father was a coal-seller. Kelmer had 15 older brothers and sisters, some of whom died in the Holocaust. In 1923, he emigrated to Winnipeg, Manitoba, Canada, and later moved to New York City in the United States.

== Professional wrestling career ==
According to the Canadian Online Explorer's Greg Oliver, there is debate regarding Kelmer's debut in professional wrestling. In 1929, local promoter Rudy Miller offered Coleman $25 (equivalent to $470 in 2025) to wrestle after seeing him work out in a Brooklyn gym. Despite this, an "Abe Coleman" wrestled to a draw with George Deslonchamps on March 19, 1928, at Madison Square Garden, but it is unknown if it was Kelmer or another wrestler with the same ring name.

Credited for inventing the dropkick, Coleman claims his inspiration to create the move came from kangaroos he observed while on a tour of Australia in 1930.

Coleman was never a champion but regarded as a solid mid-card standby. In the 1930s, Coleman defeated Jim Londos in a match in a Mexico City bullring in front of 60,000 spectators. During a 1936 match against Man Mountain Dean in front of 36,000 people, Coleman slammed Dean to the ground, breaking the ring mat and dropping the pair down to the arena floor.

Following his retirement from active in-ring competition, Coleman became a professional wrestling referee. He also promoted several wrestling shows with Bill Johnston.

== After wrestling ==
Following his retirement from wrestling, Kelmer inspected license plates for the New York State Department of Motor Vehicles.

== Personal life ==
Kelmer met June Miller in 1936, stating he met her in Madison Square Garden when he landed in her lap after being thrown from the ring. They married three years later in 1939. The couple had no children and Miller died in 1987. Kelmer lived in Forest Hills, New York. It was in Forest Hills that Kelmer subdued two attempted muggers when he was in his 80s.

Outside of wrestling, Kelmer's interests included poker and horse racing.

In his final years, Kelmer, primarily using a wheelchair, lived at the Meadow Park Rehabilitation and Health Care Center in Flushing, New York. Kelmer died on March 28, 2007, in a nursing home in Queens, New York, of kidney failure.

== Championships and accomplishments ==
- Cauliflower Alley Club
  - Other honoree (1995)
- Professional Wrestling Hall of Fame and Museum
  - Class of 2012 (Pioneer category)

== See also ==
- List of oldest surviving professional wrestlers
