= EMLL 1st Anniversary Show =

Mexican Professional wrestling show

- Promotion: Empresa Mexicana de Lucha Libre
- Date: September 21, 1934
- City: Mexico City, Mexico
- Venue: Arena Modelo

EMLL Anniversary Shows chronology
← Previous; First	Next → 2nd Anniversary

The EMLL 1st Anniversary Show (Spanish: 1. Aniversario de EMLL) was a professional wrestling major show event produced by Empresa Mexicana de Lucha Libre (EMLL, later renamed Consejo Mundial de Lucha Libre, CMLL) that took place on September 21, 1934, in Arena Modelo (In the same location Arena México was built years later), in Mexico City, Mexico. The event commemorated the first anniversary of EMLL, which became the oldest still active professional wrestling promotion in the world by the 1990s. The Anniversary show is EMLL's biggest show of the year, their Super Bowl event, where a lot of storylines conclude and important matches are held. The EMLL Anniversary Show series is the longest-running annual professional wrestling show, starting in 1934. The first anniversary show saw the debut of the first wrestler in Mexico to wear a wrestling mask, setting a trend that greatly influenced lucha libre in Mexico since then.

== Production ==
=== Background ===
The 1934 Anniversary show commemorated the 1st anniversary of the Mexican professional wrestling company Empresa Mexicana de Lucha Libre (Spanish for "Mexican Wrestling Promotion"; EMLL) holding their first show on September 22, 1933, by promoter and founder Salvador Lutteroth. EMLL was rebranded early in 1992 to become Consejo Mundial de Lucha Libre ("World Wrestling Council"; CMLL) signal their departure from the National Wrestling Alliance. With the sales of the Jim Crockett Promotions to Ted Turner in 1988, EMLL became the oldest, still-operating wrestling promotion in the world. Over the years EMLL/CMLL has on occasion held multiple shows to celebrate their anniversary but since 1977 the company has only held one annual show, which is considered the biggest show of the year, CMLL's equivalent of WWE's WrestleMania or their Super Bowl event. CMLL has held their anniversary show at Arena México in Mexico City, Mexico since 1956, the year the building was completed; over time Arena México earned the nickname "The Cathedral of Lucha Libre" due to its hosting of most of EMLL/CMLL's major events since the building was completed. EMLL held their first anniversary show at Arena Modelo in 1933 and returned to that building in 1937 through 1943. From 1934 through 1936 EMLL rented Arena Nacional for their shows, but in 1944 they began holding their anniversary shows at Arena Coliseo, an arena they owned. From 1944 through 1955 EMLL held all their anniversary shows at Arena Coliseo. Traditionally EMLL/CMLL holds their major events on Friday nights, replacing their regularly scheduled Super Viernes show. On the day of the anniversary show, EMLL owner Salvador Lutteroth won 40,000 pesos in the Mexican National Lottery, allowing him to purchase Arena Modelo and start to renovate it for future use.

=== Storylines ===
The event featured an undetermined number of professional wrestling matches with different wrestlers involved in pre-existing scripted feuds, plots and storylines. Wrestlers were portrayed as either heels (referred to as rudos in Mexico, those that portray the "bad guys") or faces (técnicos in Mexico, the "good guy" characters) as they followed a series of tension-building events, which culminated in a wrestling match or series of matches. Due to the nature of keeping mainly paper records of wrestling at the time no documentation has been found for some of the matches of the show.

== Event ==
Records of most of the first anniversary show are not found; only three of the matches are documented. On the undercard Raul Romero defeated Gorila Pogi. The main event featured two non-Mexican competitors, which was not unusual at the time since EMLL founder Salvador Lutteroth primarily used non-Mexicans in the Main Events early in EMLL's history. In the semi-main event Ray Ryan, nicknamed El Tigre ("The Tiger"), from the United States of America was disqualified for excessive violence against his opponent, French-Canadian Stephan Berne. The main event of the show featured a wrestler that would influence Lucha Libre forever as the masked La Maravilla Enmascarada (Spanish for "The Masked Marvel") made his in-ring debut. La Maravilla Enmascarada was the first ever masked wrestler in Mexico, starting a tradition of a majority of Mexican wrestlers wearing masks. Maravilla was actually Ciclon Mackey, an American wrestler that had worked for EMLL since its debut but was being presented as a new wrestler as part of the fictional storylines, or Kayfabe, that professional wrestling employs.

== Results ==
No.	Results	Stipulations
1	Stephan Berne defeated "Tigre" Ray Ryan by disqualification	Singles match
2	Raul Romero defeated Gorilla Pogi	Singles match
3	La Maravilla Enmascarada defeated Frank Gou	Singles match
