= Kurt Zehe =

German-Russian professional wrestler

Personal information
- Born: Kurt Zehe; January 12, 1913 Königsberg, Kaliningrad, German Empire (now Russia)
- Died: 1969

Professional wrestling career
- Ring name(s): Kurt Zehe; Gargantua
- Billed height: 7 ft 2 in (2.18 m)
- Billed weight: 430 lb (200 kg)
- Debut: 1935
- Retired: 1952

Kurt Zehe (January 12, 1913 – 1969), was a German-Russian professional wrestler and actor. He was better known for his ring name Gargantua and his height.

== Early life and World War II ==
Born in Kaliningrad, Germany (now Russia) stood at 7 feet 2 inches (2.18 m) and weighed 430 pounds (200 kg).

During World War II, Zehe served as a soldier stationed in Küstrin, where his extraordinary size required tailor-made uniforms and a custom-crafted steel helmet. By 1942, records indicate he weighed 195 kilograms (430 lb).

== Professional wrestling career ==
Made his professional wrestling debut in 1935. In 1936, he faced the 2.10-meter-tall Polish wrestler Leo Grabowski in a match held in Gdańsk that drew 8,000 spectators and lasted from approximately 21:30 to 23:11. In 1939, Zehe won the Gold Belt of Vienna tournament (Goldener Gürtel von Wien), securing the championship on August 26 by defeating Herbert Audersch in the final. This victory marked one of his notable pre-war achievements in Germany. Zehe would then take a hiatus from wrestling due to World War II.

After World War II, Kurt Zehe resumed his professional wrestling career in Germany, returning to the ring at the Berlin Palace. He had been imprisoned by Soviet forces toward the end of the war, suffering near-starvation and significant weight loss, but he recovered and quickly reestablished himself as a prominent heavyweight competitor. In 1947, Zehe faced world champion Hans Schwarz Jr. in Berlin in an extended bout that lasted 3½ hours, ultimately resulting in a loss for Zehe.

On September 21, 1951, Zehe fought former world heavyweight boxing champion Primo Carnera in a high-profile freestyle wrestling match in Frankfurt am Main. Carnera won in the third round with a heavy punch to the neck.

In 1952, British promoter Atholl Oakeley brought Zehe to the United Kingdom in an effort to revive the all-in wrestling style following the war. There, he adopted the size-based gimmick "Gargantua" and was heavily promoted for his extraordinary stature, with his weight recorded at 213.5 kg. He faced former boxer Jack Doyle at Harringay Arena in a widely publicized contest billed as a world heavyweight championship eliminator. Despite the advance hype, including international photos and national newspaper coverage, the match proved a major anti-climax and damaged the reputations of both Oakeley and the all-in promotion. Zehe's time in Britain was short-lived but generated significant attention due to his imposing presence.

== Acting career ==
Zehe started acting in the late 1930s. His first movie was Robert und Bertram in 1939.

Zehe resumed acting with a small number of appearances in West German films and television, where his imposing stature often led to typecasting in roles emphasizing physical size or strength. In 1950, he played Herkules in the comedy Die Sterne lügen nicht. That same year, he appeared as Gottlieb (also credited as Knecht), a farmhand, in the Heimatfilm Schwarzwaldmädel (The Black Forest Girl). Zehe continued in similar vein in 1956 with his portrayal of Balthasar in Schwarzwaldmelodie. His final credits came in 1958: he played the Kapitän in the television production Die Frau des Fotografen, a TV-Spiel directed by Imo Moszkowicz for Südwestfunk. Also that year, he appeared as the Großer Hotelangestellter (large hotel employee) in Schwarzwälder Kirsch.

== Death ==
Zehe died in 1969. His cause of death is unknown.
