= Gladiator (novel) =

1930 novel by Philip Wylie

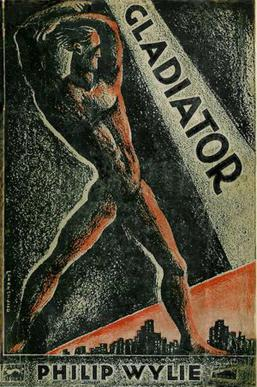
- Dust jacket of the first edition
- Author: Philip Wylie
- Language: English
- Genre: Speculative fiction
- Publisher: Alfred A. Knopf
- Publication date: 1930
- Media type: Print
- Pages: 332

Gladiator is a science fiction novel by American author Philip Wylie, first published in 1930. The story concerns a scientist who invents an "alkaline free-radical" serum to "improve" humankind by granting the proportionate strength of an ant and the leaping ability of the grasshopper. The scientist injects his pregnant wife with the serum and his son Hugo Danner is born with superhuman strength, speed, and bulletproof skin. Hugo spends much of the novel hiding his powers, rarely getting a chance to openly use them.

The novel is widely assumed to have been an inspiration for Superman due to similarities between Danner and the earliest versions of Superman who debuted in 1938, though no confirmation exists that Superman creators Jerry Siegel and Joe Shuster were directly influenced by Wylie's work.

== Publication history ==
The hardcover novel was first published by New York City, New York's Alfred A. Knopf in 1930, with book club editions that same year from Book League Monthly.

Gladiator has remained in print through several decades, with editions including hardcovers from Shakespeare House (1951), and Hyperion Press (1974, ISBN 0-88355-124-1, with an introduction by Sam Moskowitz), and paperback editions from Avon Books (1949 and 1957), Lancer Books (1958, 1965, 1967, 1973, and 1985), Manor Books (1976), the University of Nebraska Press imprint Bison Books (2004, with an introduction by Janny Wurts, ISBN 0-8032-9840-4), Disruptive Press (2004), and Blackmask (2004, ISBN 1-59654-013-3, ISBN 978-1-59654-013-2).

== Story ==
The story begins at the turn of the 20th century. Professor Abednego Danner lives in a small, rural Colorado town, and has a somewhat unhappy marriage to a conservative religious woman. Obsessed with unlocking genetic potential, Danner experiments with a tadpole (which breaks through the bowl he's keeping it in), and a pregnant cat, whose kitten displays incredible strength and speed, managing to maul larger animals. Fearing the cat may be uncontrollable, Danner poisons it. When his wife becomes pregnant with their first child, Danner duplicates his experiment on his unknowing wife.

Their child Hugo almost immediately displays incredible strength, and Danner's wife realizes what her husband has done. Though she hates him, she does not leave him, and they instead raise their son to be respectful of his incredible gift and sternly instruct him never to fight, or otherwise reveal his gifts, lest he be the target of a witch-hunt. Hugo grows up being bullied at school, unwilling to fight back. However, he finds release when he discovers the freedom the wilderness around his hometown provides, unleashing his great strength on trees as a manner of playing.

Hugo finds success in his teenage years, becoming a star football player, and receives a college scholarship. He spends summers and free time trying to find uses for his strength, becoming a professional fighter and strongman at a boardwalk. After killing another player during a football game, Hugo quits school.

Danner then journeys to France and joins the French Foreign Legion fighting in World War I, where his bulletproof skin comes in handy. Upon returning home, he gets a job at a bank, and when a person gets locked inside the vault, Hugo volunteers to get him out if everyone will leave the room. Alone, Hugo rips open the vault door, freeing the man. The banker's response is not gratitude but suspicion. Hugo is deemed an inventive safecracker who was otherwise waiting for an opportunity to rob the vault. Not only is he fired and threatened with arrest for the destruction of the vault, but he is taken away and (ineffectually) tortured. He withstands all attempts at getting him to tell how he opened the vault, escapes, and lifts a car into the air.

Next, he attempts to have an influence in politics, but becomes infuriated with the state of affairs and the bureaucracy of Washington. Still seeking a goal for his life and a purpose for his powers, he joins an archeological expedition headed for Mayan ruins. Finally finding a friend in the scientist heading the expedition, Hugo reveals his gifts and origin to him. The wise archeologist sympathizes with Danner and suggests some courses of action for him to take. That night, during a thunderstorm, Danner wanders to the top of a mountain, debating what to do. He asks God for advice, and is struck dead by a bolt of lightning.

== Reception ==
Reading the final chapter of Gladiator, you get the feeling that Philip Wylie simply didn't know what to do with his superhuman protagonist. How could he? He was not writing escapist pulp adventure, but literature. He had no guideposts, no fixed star to follow. By the conservative standards of early 20th Century literature, the superman was doomed by virtue of being a superman.

— Will Murray, "Gladiator of Iron"

According to Ellis Award nominee Andrew Salmon, "The writing is edgy, crisp, and fast-paced, with surprising disregard for the conventions and morals of the 30’s. Hugo Danner is no squeaky-clean Superman but rather comes across as gritty as Frank Miller... As an exciting superhero story, Gladiator delivers. As a piece of history, the novel rises above and beyond all expectation."

== Adaptations ==
=== Films ===
The novel was made into a comedy movie in 1938 starring Joe E. Brown and released only two months after Superman first appeared on newsstands.

=== Comics ===
The story was adapted for Marvel Comics in Marvel Preview #9 (1976) by Roy Thomas and Tony DeZuniga, roughly following the storyline of the first half of the novel. Thomas obviously hoped to conclude the adaptation but this has yet to be published. The story is billed as being "from the blockbusting novel 'Gladiator' by Philip Wylie" on the cover, with the story titled "Man God" inside. Thomas later created a character named Arn "Iron" Munro in the DC comic book Young All-Stars, as an homage to Gladiator. Iron Munro is the son of Hugo Danner, who had faked his own death, returned to Colorado and fathered Arn.

The novel was adapted into a four issue prestige style comic book by acclaimed writer Howard Chaykin with art by Russ Heath. The series was published by Wildstorm, a division of DC Comics, in 2005. The story was retitled "Legend", although the covers of the first two issues include a large blurb stating "Inspired by Philip Wylie's Gladiator". The setting of the story was moved forward to the second half of the century and the Vietnam War replaced World War I, but the story remained largely intact.

=== Television ===
Season 2 Episode 2 of the television show Fringe, entitled "Night of Desirable Objects", may have been inspired by the novel Gladiator. It involves a scientist who genetically altered his unborn child to enable his survival, and after birth, it developed into a "superbaby".

== In popular culture ==
The book appears in the possession of superhero Nite Owl in issue #1 of Alan Moore and Dave Gibbons' comic book Watchmen.
