= EMLL 2nd Anniversary Show =

Mexican Professional wrestling show

- Promotion: Empresa Mexicana de Lucha Libre
- Date: September 19, 1935
- City: Mexico City, Mexico
- Venue: Arena Nacional

EMLL Anniversary Shows chronology
| ← Previous; 1st Anniversary | Next → 3rd Anniversary |

The EMLL 2nd Anniversary Show (Spanish: 2. Aniversario de EMLL) was a professional wrestling major show event produced by Empresa Mexicana de Lucha Libre (EMLL, later renamed Consejo Mundial de Lucha Libre, CMLL) that took place on September 19, 1935, in Arena Modelo (In the same location Arena México was built years later), in Mexico City, Mexico. The event commemorated the second anniversary of EMLL, which would become the oldest still active professional wrestling promotion in the world. The Anniversary show is EMLL's biggest show of the year. The EMLL Anniversary Show series is the longest-running annual professional wrestling show, starting in 1934.

== Production ==
=== Background ===
The 1935 Anniversary show commemorated the 2nd anniversary of the Mexican professional wrestling company Empresa Mexicana de Lucha Libre (Spanish for "Mexican Wrestling Promotion"; EMLL) holding their first show on September 22, 1933 by promoter and founder Salvador Lutteroth. EMLL was rebranded early in 1992 to become Consejo Mundial de Lucha Libre ("World Wrestling Council"; CMLL) signal their departure from the National Wrestling Alliance. With the sales of the Jim Crockett Promotions to Ted Turner in 1988 EMLL became the oldest, still-operating wrestling promotion in the world. Over the years EMLL/CMLL has on occasion held multiple shows to celebrate their anniversary but since 1977 the company has only held one annual show, which is considered the biggest show of the year, CMLL's equivalent of WWE's WrestleMania or their Super Bowl event. CMLL has held their Anniversary show at Arena México in Mexico City, Mexico since 1956, the year the building was completed, over time Arena México earned the nickname "The Cathedral of Lucha Libre" due to it hosting most of EMLL/CMLL's major events since the building was completed. EMLL held their first anniversary show at Arena Modelo in 1933 and returned to that building in 1937 through 1943. From 1934 through 1936 EMLL rented Arena Nacional for their shows, but in 1944 they began holding their anniversary shows at Arena Coliseo, an arena they owned. From 1944 through 1955 EMLL held all their anniversary shows at Arena Coliseo. Traditionally EMLL/CMLL holds their major events on Friday Nights, replacing their regularly scheduled Super Viernes show.

=== Storylines ===
The event featured an undetermined number of professional wrestling matches with different wrestlers involved in pre-existing scripted feuds, plots and storylines. Wrestlers were portrayed as either heels (referred to as rudos in Mexico, those that portray the "bad guys") or faces (técnicos in Mexico, the "good guy" characters) as they followed a series of tension-building events, which culminated in a wrestling match or series of matches. Due to the nature of keeping mainly paper records of wrestling at the time no documentation has been found for some of the matches of the show.

== Event ==
Records of most of the early anniversary shows are not found, only four of the matches are documented. The overall theme for the show was "Mexico Vs Foreigners" as promoter Salvador Lutteroth started to use more and more Mexican born workers in the top matches on his show, which was part of why he became successful early on.

In the first documented match of the show Mexican Manuel "Toro" Hernandez defeated Buddy O'Brien. American representative Jack Howland defeated EMLL's own Firpo Segura. Russian Erick Bouloff wrestled and defeated Mexico born Bobby Segura, brother of Firpo Segura on the show. In the main event Luis Mayo defeated Gruber Sanson, sending the crowd home happy with a victory for the Mexicans.

== Results ==
| No. | Results | Stipulations |
|---|---|---|
| 1 | Luis Mayo defeated Phil "Sanson" Gruber | Singles match |
| 2 | Manuel "Toro" Hernandez defeated Buddy O'Brien | Singles match |
| 3 | Jack Howland defeated Firpo Segura | Singles match |
| 4 | Eric Bouloff defeated Bobby Segura | Singles match |

== September 26, 1935 show ==
Some records indicated that the September 26 show held in Arena Nacional was the 2nd Anniversary show, or perhaps the second event of 1935 to commemorate the second anniversary of EMLL.

| No. | Results | Stipulations |
|---|---|---|
| 1 | Luis Mayo defeated Jack Howland | Singles match |
| 2 | Buddy O’Brien defeated Manuel "Toro" Hernandez | Singles match |
| 3 | Douglas Hernandez defeated Sugi Shido | Singles match |
| 4 | Carlos Meza defeated Sammy Levine | Singles match |
