= Gorilla Pogi =

Italian professional wrestler

Luigi Mattu (January 23, 1902 – August 30, 1998), better known as Gorilla Pogi, and Ermete Poggi was an Italian-American professional wrestler that most notably took part in the EMLL 1st Anniversary Show on September 21, 1934. During the event he was defeated by Raul Romero

Poggi continued to wrestle in the United States throughout the 1930s to the 1950s.

He died in Albuquerque, New Mexico on August 30, 1988.
