= Paul Diamond (wrestler, born 1935) =

Canadian professional wrestler

Personal information
- Born: Paul Lehman; October 24, 1935 (age 90) Toronto, Ontario, Canada

Professional wrestling career
- Ring name: Paul Diamond
- Billed height: 6 ft 3 in (191 cm)
- Billed weight: 235 lb (107 kg)
- Debut: 1960
- Retired: 1972

Paul Lehman (born October 24, 1935) is a retired Canadian professional wrestler. He is best known by his ring name Paul Diamond who spent his career in Vancouver, Portland, Oregon and Minnesota.

== Professional wrestling career ==
Lehman began his wrestling career in 1960 in England. In 1962, he made his debut in the United States in New York City. Then in 1964, he made his debut in Vancouver for All-Star Wrestling. In 1967, Diamond made his debut in Hawaii.

In 1969, Diamond returned to his hometown Toronto to work for Maple Leaf Wrestling. That year he wrestled Lou Thesz on a show at Cobo Hall in Detroit.

Diamond made his debut for American Wrestling Association (AWA) based in Minnesota in 1970 working for Verne Gagne. He would feud with Nick Bockwinkel. In 1971 Diamond left the AWA and went to San Francisco. He retired from wrestling in 1972.

== Personal life ==
Since retiring from wrestling, Diamond has resided in California and runs a sandwich shop.
