= King of Europe Cup =

European professional wrestling event

King of Europe
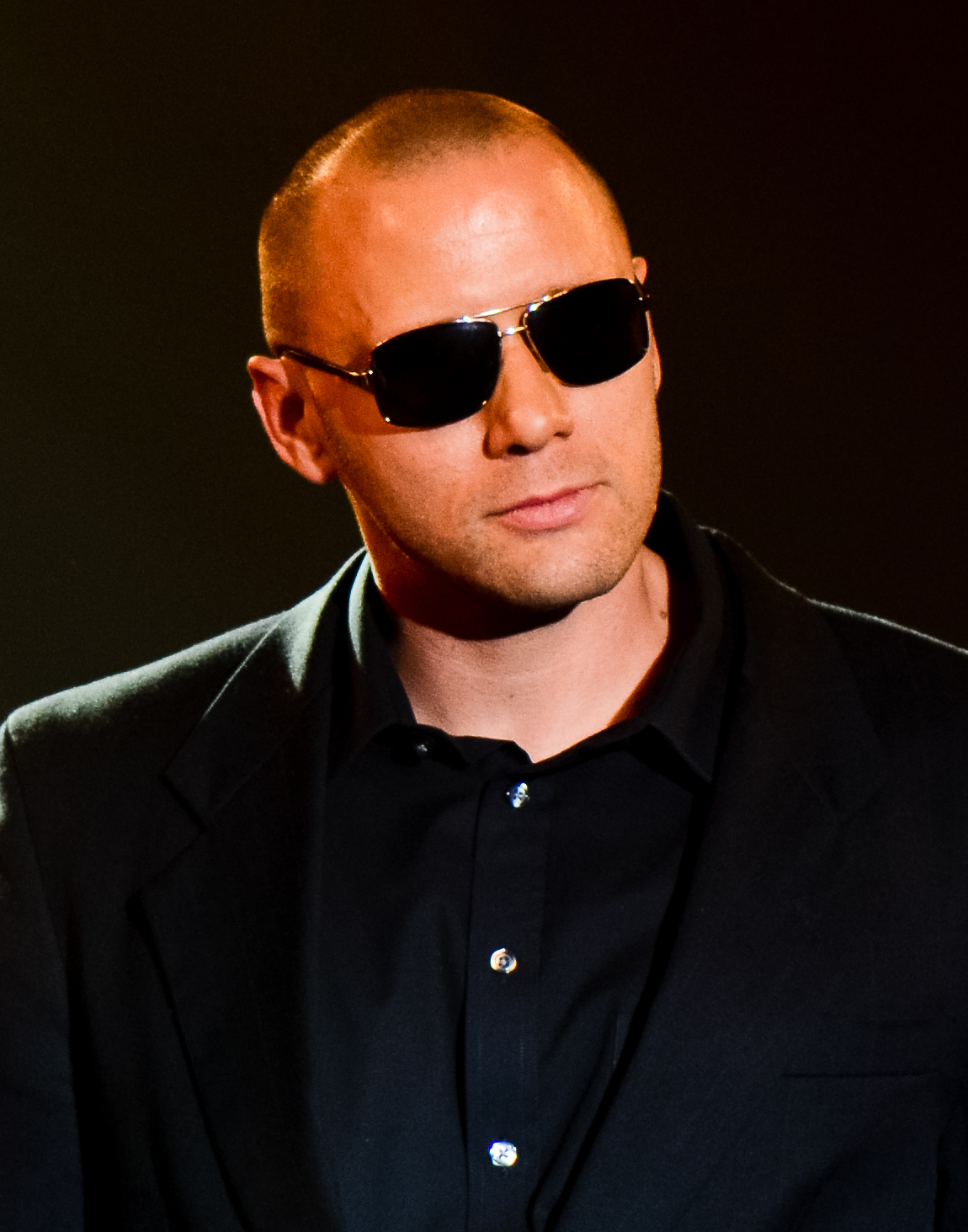
- Tournament winner Nigel McGuinness
- Venue: Liverpool Olympia
- Location: Liverpool, England
- Start date: 28 April 2007
- End date: 29 April 2007

Champion
- Nigel McGuinness

This tournament should not be confused with the "King of Europe Tournament", held in 2006 by the Austrian wrestling promotion Rings of Europe.

The King of Europe Cup (KOE cup) was a European professional wrestling tournament in the style of the Battle of Los Angeles, King of Indies, Super 8, and Ted Petty Invitational tournaments of the United States. The tournament was hosted at the Liverpool Olympia in Liverpool, England on 28 and 29 April 2007 and was the brainchild of two UK wrestling veterans Alex Shane and Doug Williams. In what was considered a historic event in British wrestling history, the tournament to crowned the KOE cup holder and involved 16 promotions and wrestlers from across the world.

== Interactive aspects ==
The following ideas were advertised on the web-site prior to the tournament, but were not implemented.

- Prize fighting

For the first time in modern British wrestling, fans were given the opportunity to make voluntary donations for match of the night. This money was then added to a £1000 match of the night cash prize which was donated by event organizers, giving £500 a night for the best match on each day. Fans were given score sheets at the start of the show and were asked to put their top three matches from that night in order. The votes were collected and the three matches with the most votes were decided. The fan donated money was then added to the $1000 prize fund giving grand cash reward.

The participants who fans selected to have the best 3 matches each night then received the prize money at the end of each night with 55% for 1st prize, 35% for second, and 10% for third prize, improving the earnings of the wrestlers who give fans the best matches.

- Match suggestions

At the end of night one, fans were asked upon leaving to select two matches using the eliminated 8 wrestlers from round one. Once again these suggestions were collected and the matches with the most audience votes were made for the following evening.

== Qualification ==
King of Europe Cup
- Promotion: Inter-promotional
- Date: 28 April 2007; 29 April 2007
- City: Liverpool, England
- Venue: Liverpool Olympia
- Attendance: up to 1700

Some promotions handpicked wrestlers to participate in the King of Europe Cup, while others held qualifying matches to determine their representatives in the tournament.

=== Chikara ===
Chikara held a qualifying match to determine its representative for the King of Europe Cup and Westside Xtreme Wrestling's 16 Carat Gold Tournament.

Time Will Prove Everything – 24 March 2007 (American Legion Hall – Hellertown, Pennsylvania, U.S.)
No.	Results	Stipulations	Times
1	Claudio Castagnoli defeated Mike Quackenbush	King of Europe Cup and 16 Carat Gold Tournament qualifying match	17:01

=== International Pro Wrestling: United Kingdom ===
Though involved with the pre-show, International Pro Wrestling: United Kingdom was not originally scheduled to enter a wrestler into the tournament. However, this was changed in February 2007 when it was revealed that IPW:UK would in fact be entering Pac.

=== International Wrestling Syndicate ===
International Wrestling Syndicate held a qualifying match to determine its representative for the King of Europe Cup and 16 Carat Gold Tournament.

Praise The Violence – 20 January 2007 (Bogey's World Bar & Billiard – Montreal, Quebec, Canada)
No.	Results	Stipulations
1	El Generico defeated Jagged and Kid Kamikaze	Three Way Dance to qualify for the King of Europe Cup and 16 Carat Gold Tournament

=== Pro Wrestling Guerrilla ===
Pro Wrestling Guerrilla held a qualifying match to determine its representative for the King of Europe Cup and 16 Carat Gold Tournament.

Passive Hostility – 2 December 2006 (American Legion Post #308 – Reseda, California, U.S.)
No.	Results	Stipulations	Times
1	Davey Richards defeated Rocky Romero	King of Europe Cup and 16 Carat Gold Tournament qualifying match	16:39

=== Real Quality Wrestling ===
Real Quality Wrestling's representative for the King of Europe Cup was determined through a one-night tournament for the vacant RQW Heavyweight Championship.

Not Just For Christmas – 16 December 2006 (York Hall – London, England)
No.	Results	Stipulations	Times
1	Pac defeated Ashley Reed	Singles match in the quarter-final round of the tournament for the vacant RQW Heavyweight Championship	—
2	Drew Galloway defeated El Ligero	Singles match in the quarter-final round of the tournament for the vacant RQW Heavyweight Championship	—
3	Martin Stone defeated Iceman	Singles match in the quarter-final round of the tournament for the vacant RQW Heavyweight Championship	—
4	Aviv Maayan defeated Jody Fleisch	Singles match in the quarter-final round of the tournament for the vacant RQW Heavyweight Championship	17:34
5	Martin Stone defeated Aviv Maayan	Singles match in the semi-final round of the tournament for the vacant RQW Heavyweight Championship	—
6	Pac defeated Drew Galloway via count-out	Singles match in the semi-final round of the tournament for the vacant RQW Heavyweight Championship	—
7	Martin Stone defeated Pac	Singles match in the tournament final for the vacant RQW Heavyweight Championship	10:38

=== Westside Xtreme Wrestling ===
Are$ qualified for the wXw spot after winning wXw's point system which saw any wrestler scoring a direct pinfall over another wrestler during one of wXw's shows was awarded one point; and whoever scored three points first would represent wXw in both this tournament and their own 16 Carat Gold Tournament. As the promotion is based on the pure effect of the sport, points are not given for a disqualification, countout, or draw or even if your tag team partner scores the fall. Wrestlers are unable to lose the points.

== Participants ==
Promotion	Country	Representative
One Pro Wrestling	United Kingdom	Jody Fleisch
Chikara	United States	Claudio Castagnoli
Combat Zone Wrestling	United States	Chris Hero
Dragon Gate	Japan	Ryo Saito
Independent Wrestling Association Mid-South	United States	Matt Sydal
International Wrestling Syndicate	Canada	El Generico
International Pro Wrestling: United Kingdom	United Kingdom	PAC
Premier Promotions	United Kingdom	Doug Williams
Pro Wrestling Guerrilla	United States	Davey Richards
Pro Wrestling Noah	Japan	Go Shiozaki
Pro Wrestling Unpluged	United States	Trent Acid
Real Quality Wrestling	United Kingdom	Martin Stone
Ring of Honor	United States	Nigel McGuinness
Total Nonstop Action Wrestling	United States	Rhino
Westside Xtreme Wrestling	Germany	Ares
World Association of Wrestling	United Kingdom	Zebra Kid

Note: Full Impact Pro was entered in the tournament with Roderick Strong as their representative, but they were replaced by World Association of Wrestling.

== Reception ==
King of Europe Cup received mixed reviews upon the DVD release of the event.

Arnold Furious of 411Mania praised the event with "an easy thumbs up", rating it 9.5. According to him, the tournament had "a number of excellent bouts". He felt that "The first night of the tournament seemed a little OTT with an assortment of finishers getting killed. It seemed in a few matches like it’d only end when someone was dead or in the case of Jody Fleisch, in hospital. That said night one contained some thrilling encounters and at the end a great and unexpected effort from Rhino of all people. The second night boasted some improved technical wrestling including a very strong final between Doug Williams and Nigel McGuinness. It’s a pity the semis were skipped over so quickly but the lack of filler meant the tournament needed a strong final and that was the only way to preserve it."

The Wrestling Revolution staff felt that the tournament featured "some great, British-style wrestling, but mostly from just Nigel (McGuinness), Doug (Williams), (Chris) Hero, Claudio (Castagnoli), and Ares" and "The lack of DQ’s was a big surprise". They praised the tournament final between McGuinness and Williams as "an awesome match", but "nothing on this show was truly special", as "many of the matches feel the like the same match over and over, especially on night one" and had "just a whole bunch of enjoyable wrestling matches".

== Results ==
=== "Taste of IPW:UK" pre-show ===
Several matches from International Pro Wrestling: United Kingdom took place on the afternoon card before the tournament matches in the evening of both dates. The two-hour pre-shows were billed as containing no interval, but due to travel problems for Rhino, the day one pre-show actually had two intervals. These pre-shows gave one of the UK's fastest growing independent companies a chance to be seen in front of their largest audience ever.

Afternoon One (28 April 2007)
No.	Results	Stipulations
1	The Untouchables (Dave Moralez and Jack Storm) defeated Sweet Justice (Blok Busta and C-Juice)	Tag team match
2	Dragon Phoenix defeated Claudio Castagnoli	Singles match
3	Andy Boy Simmonz (c) defeated Spud	Singles match for the IPW:UK World Championship
4	Pac defeated El Generico (2:1)^{1}	Two out of three falls match
5	Martin Stone defeated Rhino via disqualification	Singles match
(c) / – the champion(s) heading into the match

^1

Fall:	Scoring Wrestler	Method
1	Pac	Pac pinned Generico with a cradle
2	El Generico	Generico pinned Pac after a Brainbustahhh!!
3	Pac	Pac pinned Generico after a modified Dragonrana.
Winner:	Pac	

Afternoon Two (29 April 2007)
No.	Results	Stipulations
1	The Untouchables (Dave Moralez and Jack Storm) defeated The Entourage (Mark Sloan and Ollie Burns)	Tag team match
2	Dragon Aisu defeated CJ Juice	Singles match
3	Martin Stone defeated The Zebra Kid	Singles match
4	Andy Boy Simmonz (c) defeated Blok Busta	Singles match for the IPW:UK World Championship
5	Swiss Money Holding (Ares and Claudio Castagnoli) (c) defeated The Dragon Hearts (Dragon Phoenix and Spud)	Tag team match for the IPW:UK Tag Team Championship
(c) / – the champion(s) heading into the match

=== King of Europe ===
The results of the main King of Europe card for both days are as follows:

Night One (28 April 2007)
No.	Results	Stipulations	Times
1	Chris Hero defeated Claudio Castagnoli	Singles match in the King of Europe Cup first round	14:18
2	Go Shiozaki defeated Martin Stone	Singles match in the King of Europe Cup first round	13:30
3	Pac defeated Trent Acid	Singles match in the King of Europe Cup first round	17:24
4	Matt Sydal defeated El Generico	Singles match in the King of Europe Cup first round	12:25
5	Doug Williams defeated Ares	Singles match in the King of Europe Cup first round	14:08
6	Davey Richards defeated Zebra Kid	Singles match in the King of Europe Cup first round	12:05
7	Ryo Saito defeated Jody Fleisch	Singles match in the King of Europe Cup first round	15:04
8	Nigel McGuinness defeated Rhino	Singles match in the King of Europe Cup first round	14:47

Night Two (29 April 2007)
No.	Results	Stipulations	Times
1	Doug Williams defeated Chris Hero	Singles match in the King of Europe Cup quarter-final round	16:34
2	Nigel McGuinness defeated Pac	Singles match in the King of Europe Cup quarter-final round	10:50
3	Davey Richards defeated Go Shiozaki	Singles match in the King of Europe Cup quarter-final round	15:51
4	Matt Sydal defeated Ryo Saito	Singles match in the King of Europe Cup quarter-final round	10:03
5	Nigel McGuinness defeated Davey Richards	Singles match in the King of Europe Cup semi-final round	6:51
6	Doug Williams defeated Matt Sydal	Singles match in the King of Europe Cup semi-final round	9:19
7	Atsushi Aoki, El Generico and Martin Stone defeated Trent Acid and Swiss Money Holding (Ares and Claudio Castagnoli)^{2}	Six-man elimination tag team match	21:42
8	Nigel McGuinness defeated Doug Williams	Singles match in the King of Europe Cup final	18:49

^2

Eliminated:	Wrestler:	Eliminated by:	Method:
1	Trent Acid	Atsushi Aoki	Submission
2	Atsushi Aoki	Ares	Pinfall
3	El Generico	Claudio Castagnoli	Pinfall
4	Ares	Martin Stone	Pinfall
5	Claudio Castagnoli	Martin Stone	Pinfall
Winner:	Martin Stone		

=== Tournament brackets ===
16 wrestlers, chosen or qualified from sixteen separate promotions around the world, faced off in a single-elimination two-night tournament, to ultimately crown the King of Europe cupholder.

Round of 16; Night 1
Chris Hero (CZW)
Claudio Castagnoli (Chikara)
Doug Williams (Premier Promotions)
Are$ (wXw)
Ryo Saito (Dragon Gate)
Jody Fleisch (1PW)
Matt Sydal (IWA:MS)
El Generico (IWS)
Go Shiozaki (NOAH)
Martin Stone (RQW)
Davey Richards (PWG)
Zebra Kid (WAW)
Pac (IPW:UK)
Trent Acid (PWU)
Nigel McGuiness (ROH)
Rhino (TNA)

Quarterfinals; Night 2
Chris Hero
Doug Williams
Ryo Saito
Matt Sydal
Go Shiozaki
Davey Richards
Pac
Nigel McGuiness

Semifinals; Night 2
Doug Williams
Matt Sydal
Davey Richards
Nigel McGuiness

Final; Night 2
Doug Williams
Nigel McGuiness
