= Stevie Knight =

British wrestler (born 1976)

Personal information
- Born: 4 February 1976 (age 50) Grimsby, England

Professional wrestling career
- Ring name: Stevie Knight
- Billed height: 5 ft 11 in (1.80 m)
- Billed weight: 205 lb (93 kg)
- Debut: June 1991
- Retired: July 2009

Stevie Knight (born 4 February 1976) is a former English professional wrestler.

== Professional wrestling career ==
He began training in April 1991 and started putting up rings and taking photographs for promoter Max Crabtree. He made his professional debut in June 1991 at Whitby, Yorkshire, at the young age of 14. He wrestled extensively in and around Europe for the following ten years working as many as 10 shows a week for various promoters.

In 1997, Knight travelled to Germany and France and a tour of the Middle East. The following year, he worked for numerous promoters on a full-time basis and made a short tour of Belgium.

In 1999, he worked on British television for Ultimate Wrestling Alliance (UWA), the first nationally televised wrestling show in Britain in over 10 years, and was crowned UWA television champion in June of that year. He also wrestled a match for the UWA in a three-way with Doug Williams and Kerry Cabrero. He wrestled in the United States of America for 12 weeks in late 1999, picking up extra bookings and the offer of work in Puerto Rico. While living in America was a guest trainer at the Jimmy Valiant wrestling camp.

In 2000, he cut back on wrestling schedule due to a neck injury suffered in the US when the ring collapsed after a move of the top rope. Knight needed surgery to remove fragment of bones from his spinal column. In April 2000, he opened up the "Steve Knight School of Wrestling". In June 2003, after having intense physical therapy returned to wrestling with numerous promoters and was soon wrestling 3 – 4 times a week for numerous British promoters and was crowned BCW Champion on 5 December 2003 in Kilmarnock, by defeating Drew Galloway, who was declared champion the same night.

=== Frontier Wrestling Alliance ===
Knight worked with the Frontier Wrestling Alliance (FWA) from 2003 to 2006. On 2 August 2003, Knight – who had recently made a comeback to the ring after injury - won the FWA Tag Team Championship with Alex Shane at the Dome in Morecambe. The title reign was short-lived as Knight and Shane dropped the belts back to The Family two days later at his home ground of Cleethorpes.

Knight became a regular with the FWA as a heel, appearing at Hotwired 2003 and as a guest ring announcer at FWA British Uprising 2 on 18 October 2003, where he insulted female wrestler Nikita. This led to false speculation that Knight was the wrestler who had placed a bounty on Nikita's head. They had a one-on-one match in Morecambe on 29 May 2004, which he lost by clean pinfall.

In July 2004, Knight began a quest to win back the tag team title, which saw him try out various partners including Dirk Feelgood. He eventually settled on Mark Sloan. The Knight-Sloan tag team came to an end after they lost to Hampton Court on 13 November 2004, at the Coventry SkyDome at British Uprising 3.

In 2005, Knight embarked on a quest to win the FWA British Flyweight Title, even though his ground-based 'old school' brawling and scientific wrestling style were not exactly the typical lucha libre style used by most flyweight wrestlers. In several matches, Knight would precariously try to climb to the top rope to attempt a moonsault, only to think better of it when the fans chanted: "You can’t do it!” Knight's quest flopped as he was pinned by newcomer Stevie Lynn at War on the Shore on 26 March 2005.

On 18 March 2005, he teamed with long-time friend Doug Williams in a match with Mitsuharu Misawa and Yoshinari Ogawa for BCW in Carluke, Scotland. The following day at TWC International Showdown, an event that drew 3,500 fans to the Coventry SkyDome, Knight teamed with Stixx and Mark Sloan to lose to Jack Xavier, Aviv Maayan and Ross Jordan.

On 18 June 2005, Knight turned 'babyface' after he tried to retire from wrestling, only to be challenged to an FWA Title match by his former partner Alex Shane, which Knight lost. He agreed to continue his career for one more match, and beat Shane in a non-title lumberjack match back at The Dome on 30 July 2005. After this bout, Knight was attacked by a face from his past, a former opponent from the 1990s, Johnny Angel.

On 4 March 2006 Knight made a surprise return to the FWA and attacked Johnny Angel at War on the Shore 2. He and Angel were then the final two in the Gold Rush rumble only for All-Star Wrestling's Five Star Flash to interfere, meaning Knight and Angel were co-winners. Afterward, Flash and Robbie Brookside attacked Knight. On 13 May 2006 Knight captained FWA to reclaim the Cup from Brookside's ASW squad, although Knight himself tapped out to Brookside in a Survivor-style elimination match due to an ankle injury.

Knight resumed his feud with Johnny Angel and they wrestled at Cleethorpes on 23 September 2006 and at Worcester on 19 November 2006. The feud was decided in an 'I Quit' match at Morecambe on 3 February 2007 when Knight lost, the referee stopping the match after Knight was knocked cold by an Angel tombstone piledriver and had to be helped from the ring.

=== XWA ===
The FWA changed its name to the XWA and ran its first show under the new name on 7 April 2007. Knight, who had been omitted from the XWA's team to defend the British Inter-Federation Cup against WAW because XWA owner Greg Lambert was concerned over Knight's various injury problems, turned heel on this show by blasting Darren Burridge with a kendo stick, costing XWA the Cup.

Knight received a blistering heel reaction from the Morecambe crowd on 29 June 2007, when he pinned Declan O’Connor and declared himself 'Mr Deal Or No Deal'. He then entered a feud with Sam Slam. He and Ricky Knight beat Sam and Darren Burridge by DQ at XWA Last Fight at the Prom on 24 November 2007 in Morecambe. On 2 February 2008 he had a controversial win in the XWA's annual Goldrush 15-man rumble, lastly eliminating Sam Slam (who had earlier thrown Knight over the top rope when officials were distracted by an outside-ring brawl between Jonny Storm and Johnny Phere).

Knight challenged Jonny Storm for the British heavyweight title at "XWA War on the Shore at The Dome IV", Morecambe, on 12 April but failed to win the belt. Although he pinned Storm for a three count, referee Richard Young and ringside enforcer Stixx agreed to restart the match because Knight had illegally thrown powder in Storm's eyes. Storm then pinned Knight after a superkick.

On 5 July 2008 Knight was the final survivor in a Final Four elimination match at XWA Vendetta against Sam Slam, Johnny Phere and 'The Wonderkid' Jonny Storm, lastly pinning Storm after a series of piledrivers, becoming the British Heavyweight Champion for the first time. On 6 September 2008, Knight lost the title to Sam Slam and announced retirement. He returned to The Dome for Vendetta 2009 for a farewell match against 'RockStar' Spud and was given an emotional send-off by the XWA roster before going to live in Cyprus.

== Promoter ==
Having promoted wrestling events since 1994, Knight promoted his biggest show at the KC Arena in Hull, on 2 August 2004 which drew over 1,000 fans. Under the name of IWP, the show was supposed to be headlined by Jake 'The Snake' Roberts, who failed to show up. IWP returned to Hull on 6 November 2004, for a show headlined by D-Lo Brown versus Paul Burchill.

In May and June 2005, Knight promoted the FWA's Carnage Tour – centred on D-Lo Brown and Joe Legend. The intention was for FWA to run shows at new venues in the Yorkshire area to build up new fan bases for the promotion.

Knight was also the regional promoter for several FWA shows at the Winter Gardens in Cleethorpes from 2003 to 2006.

== Other media ==
In July 2007, Knight appeared on Britain's biggest game show Deal or No Deal (presented by Noel Edmonds) on Channel 4. After serving his time as one of the 'wing' contestants opening the boxes for the main gameplayer, he finally got his chance to play the game and take on the Banker on 29 August 2007. Knight took a Deal at £10,001 but had he played on, would have won £100,000.

== Where are they now ==
Knight now lives in Cyprus. He occasionally returns to the UK and recently as of this writing held several wrestling seminars.

== Championships and accomplishments ==
- British Championship Wrestling
  - BCW Heavyweight Championship (1 time)
- Frontier Wrestling Alliance
  - FWA Tag Team Championship (1 time) - with Alex Shane
- XWA
  - British Heavyweight Championship (1 time)
