= British Flyweight Championship =

Professional wrestling championship

Details
- Promotion: XWA; Frontier Wrestling Alliance
- Date established: 30 July 2005
- Date retired: July 28, 2012

Other name(s)
- FWA Flyweight Championship (2005–2007); XWA British Flyweight Championship (2007–present)
Statistics
- First champion(s): Ross Jordan
- Final champion(s): Jynkz
- Most reigns: RJ Singh, El Ligero (3 reigns)
- Longest reign: Spud (574 days)
- Shortest reign: El Ligero (63 days)

The British Flyweight Championship is a British flyweight professional wrestling championship currently defended in XWA. It was created in the Frontier Wrestling Alliance (FWA), a promotion that was closed in 2007. In 2009, FWA announced plans to reopen and initiate a Flyweight Championship tour; it is unknown how this will affect the status of the current British Flyweight Championship.

== History ==
The championship was originally created and defended in the Frontier Wrestling Alliance in 2005 as a title belt for the lighter wrestlers who did not qualify for the British Heavyweight Championship; though flyweight is often defined by a 123 lb or 112 lb weight limit in mixed martial arts and boxing, respectively, no strict weight limits are enforced for this belt. The inaugural champion was decided by an eight-man elimination tournament, the brackets for which were:

First Round
Aviv Maayan	Pin
Bubblegum
Ross Jordan	Pin
Dan Head
Spud	Pin
Jack Storm
Max Voltage	Pin
Mark Sloan

Semifinals
Ross Jordan	Pin
Aviv Maayan
Spud	Pin
Max Voltage

Final
Ross Jordan	Awd
Spud

Ross Jordan was awarded the final match against Spud after the referee stopped the contest due to an injury to Spud's leg. This controversial ending would see Jordan crowned the first FWA Flyweight Champion.

== Title History ==
No.	Champion	Reign	Date	Days held	Location	Event	Notes	Ref.
1	Ross Jordan	1	30 July 2005	246	Morecambe, Lancashire	Live event	Defeated Spud in a tournament final	
2	Pac	1	2 April 2006	252	Broxbourne, Hertfordshire	Crunch	Defeated Ross Jordan and Stevie Lynn in a three-way match	
3	Ross Jordan	2	10 December 2006	349	Colchester, Essex	Gorefest 2006 - King of the Death Match	This was an event cross held under the promotions X-Sports:Wrestling and Westside Xtreme Wrestling. The title was renamed the British Flyweight Championship in April 2007 when the Frontier Wrestling Alliance was put out of business and XWA carried its lineage	
4	El Ligero	1	24 November 2007	224	Morecambe, Lancashire	Last Fight at the Prom 2007	Mexican Street Fight	
5	Spud	1	5 July 2008	574	Morecambe, Lancashire	Vendetta 2008	Last Man Standing match; in September Spud becomes a double champion by winning the British Heavyweight Championship	
-	Vacant	-	30 January 2010		Morecambe, Lancashire	Goldrush 2010	Greg Lambert stripped Spud of the title for not defending the title	
6	El Ligero	2	30 January 2010	63	Morecambe, Lancashire	Goldrush 2010	Defeated CJ Banks, Marty Scurll and Sam Bailey for the vacant title	
7	RJ Singh	3	3 April 2010	105	Morecambe, Lancashire	War On The Shore VI	Previous held the championship under the name Ross Jordan	
8	El Ligero	3	17 July 2010	567	Morecambe, Lancashire	Vendetta 2011		
9	Jynkz	1	4 February 2012	175	Morecambe, Lancashire	Gold Rush 2012		
-	Retired	-	28 July 2012		Morecambe, Lancashire	XWA vs GPW Vendetta	The company went on hiatus after being defeated by GPW	

== Combined reigns ==
Rank	Champion	No. of reigns	Combined days
1	El Ligero	3	854
2	Ross Jordan/RJ Singh	3	700
3	Spud	1	574
4	Pac	1	252
5	Jynkz	1	175

== See also ==
- Professional wrestling in the United Kingdom
