= Drake Maverick =

British professional wrestler (born 1983)

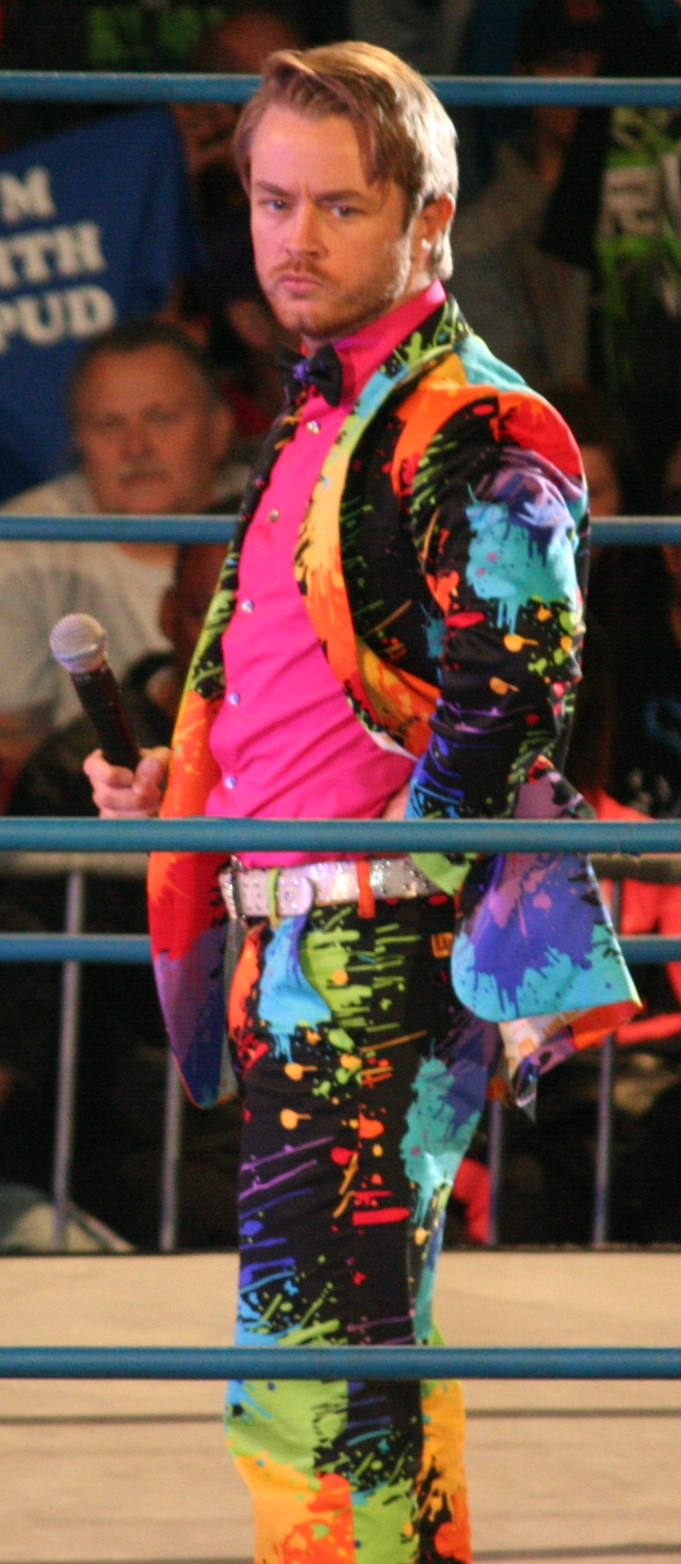
- Maverick (as Rockstar Spud) in 2014

Personal information
- Born: James Michael Curtin; 30 January 1983 (age 43) Birmingham, England
- Spouse: Renee Michelle (m. 2019)

Professional wrestling career
- Ring name(s): Drake Maverick; Rockstar Spud; Spud
- Billed height: 5 ft 4 in (163 cm)
- Billed weight: 140 lb (64 kg)
- Billed from: Birmingham, England
- Trained by: Don Charles; Jack Storm
- Debut: 2001

James Michael Curtin (born 30 January 1983) is an English professional wrestler. He is signed to WWE as a writer for the Raw brand. In the company he worked under the ring name Drake Maverick. He also worked for Total Nonstop Action Wrestling (TNA), under the ring name Rockstar Spud.

During his first decade, Curtin performed as Rockstar Spud, and worked in the British independent circuit, winning several championships in promotions like International Pro Wrestling: United Kingdom (IPW:UK), One Pro Wrestling (1PW), Revolution Pro Wrestling (RPW), and XWA Wrestling. In 2012, he appeared in the Total Nonstop Action Wrestling (TNA, later Impact Wrestling) program British Boot Camp, winning the competition and being signed to a contract with the promotion. In TNA/Impact, he was a two-time X Division Champion.

Curtin left Impact in October 2017 and signed a contract with WWE that same month. He performed under the ring name Drake Maverick, first as the on-screen General Manager of 205 Live, the brand created by WWE for their cruiserweight division (205 lbs. and under), and served for a brief time as the manager of AOP on Raw. In 2019, he became more active as an in-ring competitor, becoming an eight-time 24/7 Champion. He was released from the company in April 2020 due to budget cuts resulting from the COVID-19 pandemic. Following his release, WWE still had Curtin compete in the multi-month Interim NXT Cruiserweight Championship tournament. Despite losing in the finals, he was given a new WWE contract and joined the NXT brand, where he formed a short-lived tag team with Killian Dain, until he returned to the main roster as part of Raw, and was released once again in 2021. He returned to WWE a year later, working as a part of the creative team.

== Professional wrestling career ==
=== Independent circuit (2001–2014) ===
James Michael Curtin was born in Birmingham on 30 January 1983. He was originally trained by Jack Storm and Chris Gilbert at the K-Star Wrestling promotion in the Perry Barr area of Birmingham, before eventually coming under the tutelage of "Charming" Don Charles at the SAS Wrestling Academy. Under the ring name Spud, he went on to perform in many independent promotions within the United Kingdom, the United States, and Europe. While on the independent circuit, Spud's first major appearances came with Brenden Sumling and his brother (Billy Bernard Sumling Jr.) in the Revolution British Wrestling promotion in 2003. On 30 August 2003, Spud defeated Jack Hazard to become RBW's first British Welterweight Champion, a title he held for several months before losing it to "The Gift" Ross Jordan in an Iron Man match in December 2003.

Spud began working for Frontier Wrestling Alliance in 2004, and was brought up into the main roster to be used as a jobber for a short time, competing against many larger opponents. During the start of 2005, however, FWA began showcasing their flyweight division; later that year, Spud entered into a tournament to crown a Flyweight Champion. He made it to the tournament final, where he was defeated by Ross Jordan, who became the first FWA Flyweight Champion. However, Jordan was only awarded the match after the referee stopped the contest due to a kayfabe injury to Spud's leg. The pair continued to feud for over 14 months, with Jordan repeatedly attacking Spud in attempts to re-injure his leg. The feud ended when Spud defeated Jordan in a Last Man Standing match at FWA Last Fight at the Prom on 30 September 2006.

Following a talent trading agreement with the FWA, Spud made his first US appearance in April 2006, competing for Ring of Honor during their two-night Weekend of Champions shows. Spud appeared during ROH's first tour of shows in the UK in August 2006, Unified and Anarchy in the UK. He competed under the FWA banner during the British Under 23's Championship event, being FWA's entry into the tournament to crown the first champion under 23 years of age. However, Spud lost to the tournament's eventual winner Sam Slam in the first round.

Upon the FWA's relaunch, Spud performed under his Rockstar gimmick with an over-the-top entrance including a female security guard, a band, and a groupie. At the comeback show, New Frontiers, Spud was placed into the FWA Flyweight Championship Tournament and won the qualifying fatal four-way match. He lost in the next round to Jonny Storm. In 2010, Spud became locked in a war of words with Storm and would take part in multiple FWA Flyweight Championship tournaments. His feud with Storm culminated in a match at New Frontiers 2011, which ended in a no contest.

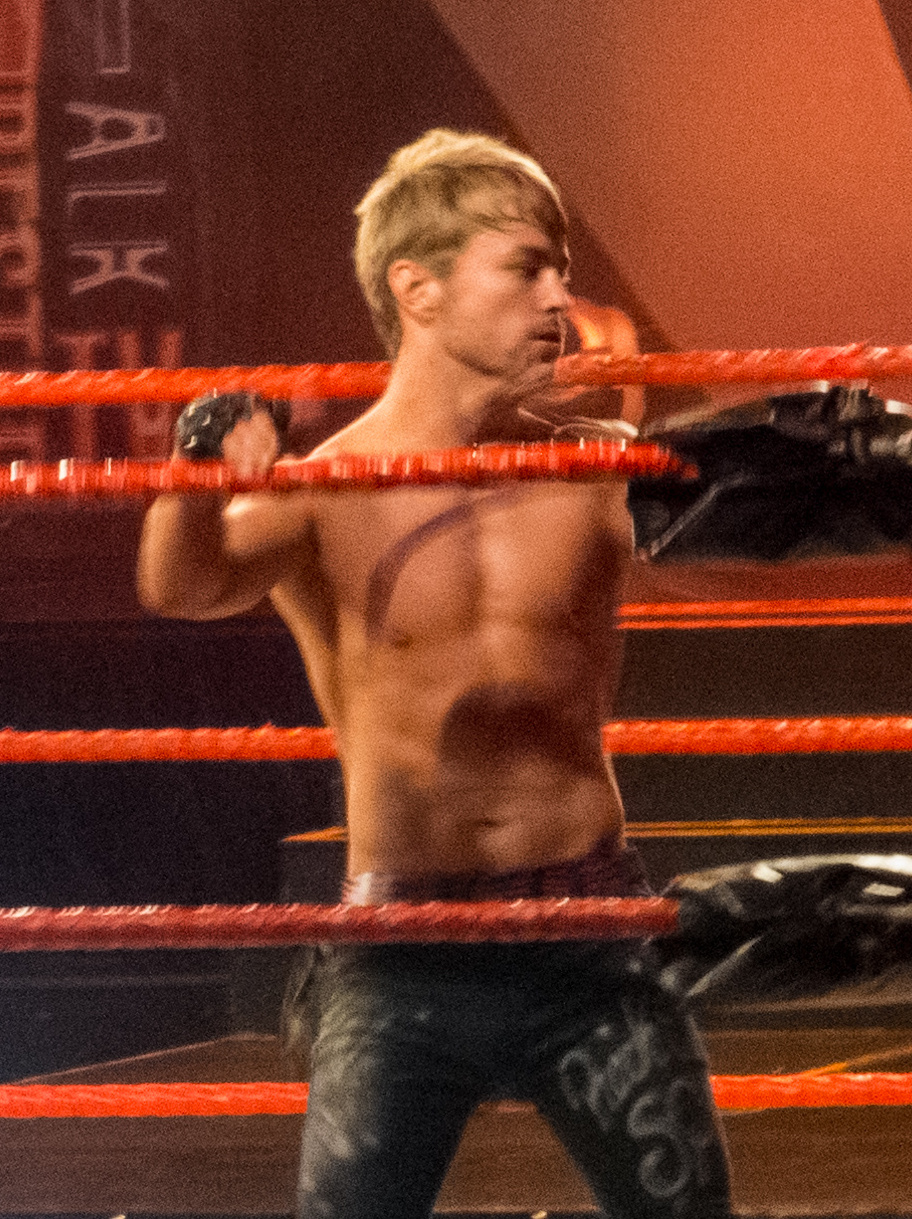
Spud wrestling for IPW in 2010

Spud competed regularly for the International Pro Wrestling: United Kingdom promotion right from its creation in 2004. Through 2005, Spud had a high-profile feud with Jack Storm, which culminated in a street fight in January 2006. While in IPW:UK, Spud became one half of the tag team Dragon Hearts, with fellow wrestler Dragon Phoenix. On 24 September 2006, Dragon Hearts defeated The Untouchables in a Tables, Ladders, and Chairs match to become IPW:UK Tag Team Champions. The Dragon Hearts also got involved with IPW:UK's inter-federation feud with Frontier Wrestling Alliance, and even though Spud is a regular for that promotion he wrestled on the side of IPW:UK in a match against Team FWA. The Dragon Hearts teamed up with Leroy Kincaide to face off against Iceman, Jonny Storm, and Jorge Castano in a match that saw both Phoenix and Spud suffer injury. Phoenix suffered a deep wound to his head while Spud suffered what appeared to be a separated or dislocated shoulder due to a dropkick at the hands of Storm. Storm and Spud faced off in a grudge match in early 2007 with Spud picking up the win.

Spud went on to represent IPW:UK in the joint FWA vs IPW:UK Final Frontiers show losing to Hade Vansen. After a losing effort against IPW:UK Tag team champions Swiss Money Holdings in IPW:UK's debut in Liverpool, Luke Dragon Phoenix left the promotion disbanding The Dragon Hearts. Back to singles action, Spud went on to face Big Brother contestant Billi Bhatti in a losing effort thanks to the Hated Heroes. Spud recently defeated Dave Moralez and Eamon O'Neill to advance in the opening rounds of the British National Championship but was defeated by Sam Slam in the Quarter Finals. Spud's last recent appearances for IPW:UK have seen him in losing efforts to former Gladiator's and current TNA star Magnus Nick 'Oblivion' Aldis.

Spud returned to the promotion after six months under his "Rockstar" character and defeated Lion Kid to become the IPW:UK Cruiserweight Champion. Spud has appeared for the London and Midlands based promotion SAS Wrestling since its establishment in 2005. He has waged war with long-time nemesis Jack Storm after he turned on him in the "Bring Your Jeans" show of November 2005. Spud battled against Team Charming members for nearly a year to get his hands on Jack Storm. He faced him eventually in the final of the first SAS UK Wrestling Championship tournament by pinning his foe after a hard-fought encounter thought by many as UK Match of the Year in 2006. Spud lost the championship a month later thanks to Jack Storm's manager Charming Don Charles, and in another long feud eventually wrestled him in a one on one Bring Your Jeans Streetfight match pinning him with one foot after a steel chair shot to the head.

Spud became SAS UK Champion once again by defeating Jack Storm in April 2008 in a steel cage match. Recently Spud turned his back on the fans by attacking Phil Bedwell, citing the fans not caring about him as much as they do about the former alcoholic as his motivation, and evolved into his 'Rockstar' persona. Spud defended the championship for most of 2009 against Derise Coffie and Bubblegum before finally losing the championship to Bubblegum in a Steel cage match in June 2010. Spud would continue to sporadically appear of IPW before leaving for Total Nonstop Action Wrestling.

After the feud between FWA and IPW:UK ended, the XWA promotion was founded from the remains of the FWA. Spud feuded with XWA Flyweight Champion El Ligero, defeating him in a last man standing match to become champion with help from The Kartel and Martin Stone to form 'The Firm' faction. Spud won the annual Goldrush rumble to become the No 1 Contender to the XWA Heavyweight Championship while still the XWA Flyweight Champion, which he succeeded in doing after beating Sam Slam at the 2009 Last Fight at the Prom. However, Curtin was stripped of the XWA Flyweight Championship due to his lack of defences and also lost the XWA Heavyweight Championship later in the year to Johnny Phere. Spud, since losing the XWA Heavyweight Championship, suffered a number of defeats and was then injured in September 2010 in a match with Nathan Cruz. Spud made his return in February 2011, confronting Cruz and his former allies Team Rockstar for abandoning him in the annual XWA Goldrush Rumble.

Pro Wrestling Guerrilla made their first tour of the UK in February 2006 where Spud teamed with Topgun Talwar and Aviv Maayan faced Excalibur, Disco Machine and Ronin in a 6-man tag team match where Spud was pinned by Excalibur. At PWG's second UK show in October 2007 Spud faced off against Joey Ryan. Ryan pinned Spud after a Superkick. Spud also became one of the top British stars in the One Pro Wrestling roster since its inception in 2005. Still competing under the out matched underdog gimmick, Spud had a longtime feud with American wrestler Sterling James Keenan and the super heavyweight Abyss. Spud and partner Luke Dragon Phoenix resurfaced in 1PW to win the Tag Team Titles in their debut as a team, but Spud left the promotion in the Winter of 2007 after losing the 1PW Tag Team Titles to The Damned Nation along with partner Luke Dragon Phoenix. Spud later returned to 1PW at The 3rd Year Anniversary, as Hubba Bubba Lucah's mystery tag team partner to finally cause the disbanding of the Damned Nation. On 15 November 2009, he defeated Darkside to win the 1PW Openweight Championship. On 20 September 2014, Spud made his debut for Chikara, losing to Juan Francisco de Coronado.

=== Total Nonstop Action Wrestling / Impact Wrestling (2012–2017) ===
==== British Boot Camp and Ohio Valley Wrestling (2012–2013) ====
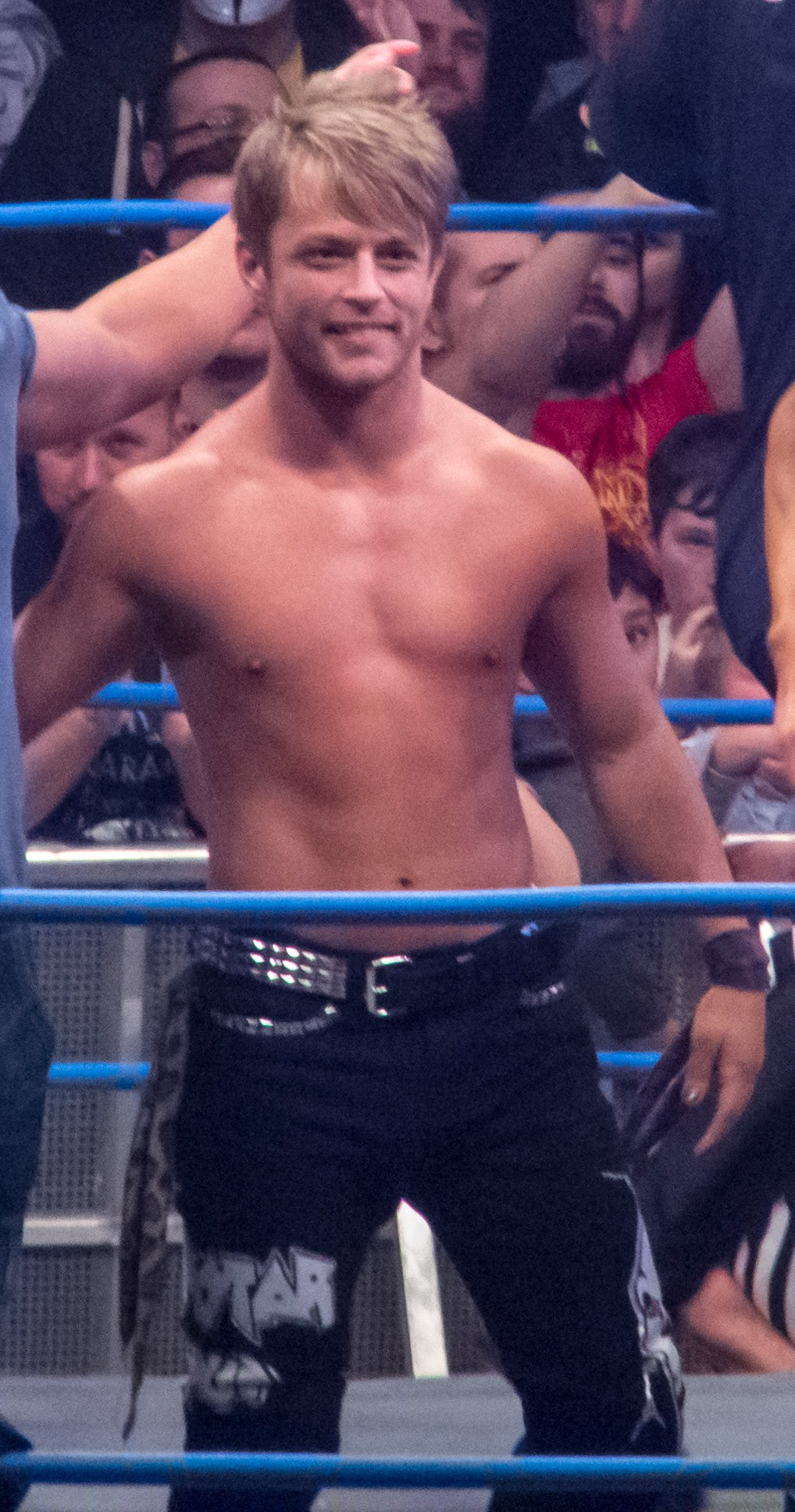
Rockstar Spud in 2013

On 5 September 2012, Total Nonstop Action Wrestling (TNA) announced that it had completed filming of British Boot Camp that began airing on 1 January 2013, it also including Spud. Spud won the competition and earned a spot in the TNA roster. Spud made his debut on 7 February episode of Impact Wrestling, in an interview segment that was interrupted by Robbie E and Robbie T and ended with Spud attacking Robbie E. Spud made his in-ring debut on 21 February episode of Impact Wrestling, defeating Robbie E.

Spud returned on 18 July episode of Impact Wrestling, when he took part in the Destination X episode of Impact Wrestling and entered a tournament to determine the new X Division Champion; he was defeated by Greg Marasciulo in his first round three-way match, which also included Rubix.

Then, Spud was sent to Ohio Valley Wrestling, TNA's developmental territory and made his debut on 13 March 2013 episode of OVW. He defeated Cliff Compton for the OVW Television Championship, making him the first man to win the title in his debut match. He would go on to defend the title for 59 days and making several successful weekly defences before losing it to Randy Royal.

==== Team Dixie (2013–2014) ====
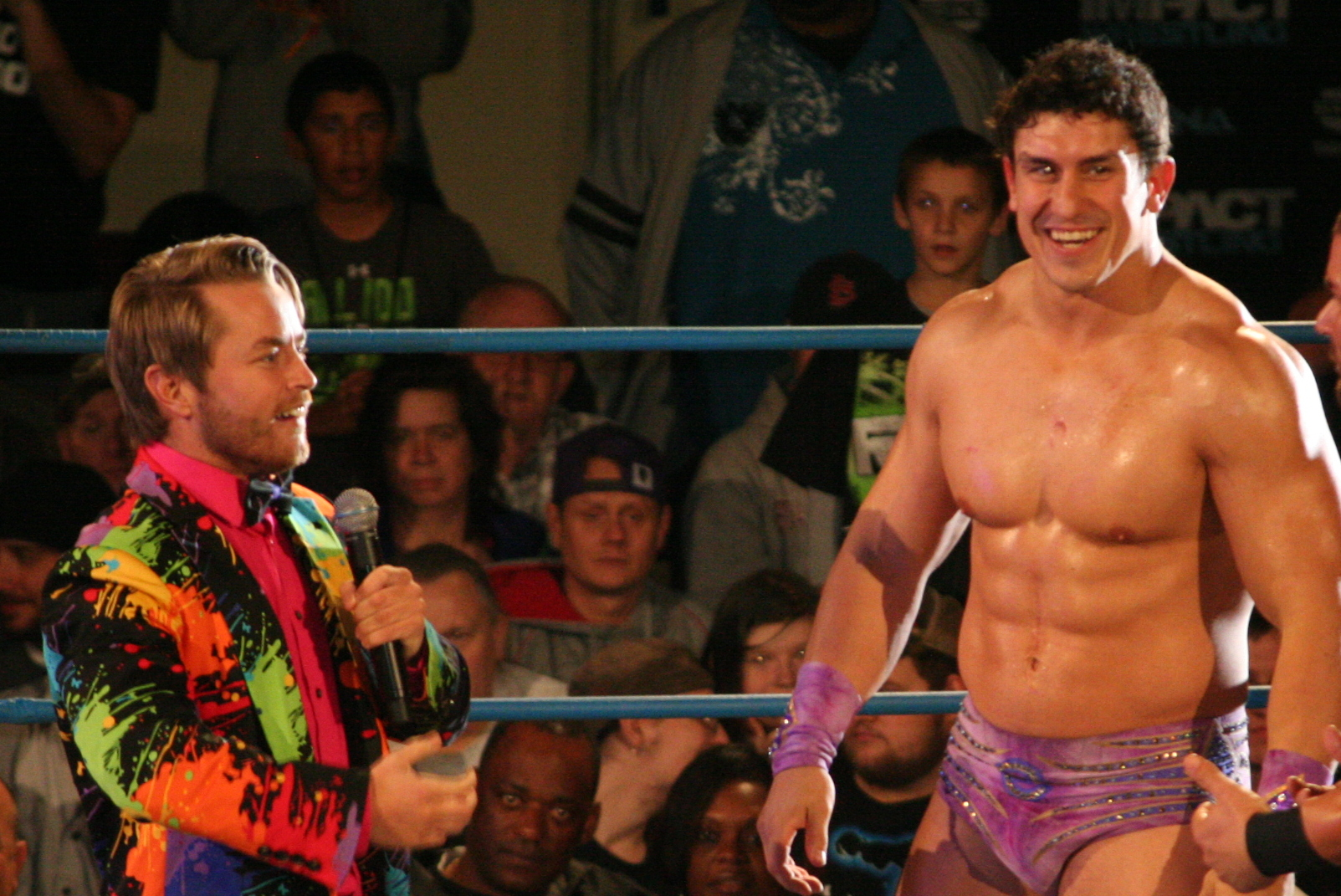
Spud (left) with Ethan Carter III in April 2014

On 28 November episode of Impact Wrestling, Spud returned as Dixie Carter's new chief of staff. Later on the night, he hosted an in-ring Thanksgiving dinner with the entire heel roster only to be interrupted by Kurt Angle and the faces of TNA which ended in a brawl. On 30 January 2014 episode of Impact Wrestling, he attempted to interrogate The Wolves (Davey Richards and Eddie Edwards) over who The Investor was, only to get beaten down. After Team Dixie was defeated by Team MVP at Lockdown, MVP, having become the director of wrestling operations, abolished the position of chief of staff.

However, when his TNA contract was up for renewal in April 2014, Carter, upon her return, awarded him a 'substantial contract extension' in reward for his loyalty to her, and also retained his position as her chief of staff. Through TNA's relationship with Wrestle-1, Spud made his debut for the Japanese promotion in Tokyo on 6 July, teaming with Ethan Carter III in a tag team match, where they were defeated by Tajiri and Yusuke Kodama. On 4 September episode of Impact Wrestling, Spud came out to the ring with Ethan Carter III and cut a promo about Carter's anger at those who he held responsible for TNA President and his aunt Dixie Carter getting put through a table.

On 8 October episode of Impact Wrestling, Ethan Carter III called him out and gave him a chance to make amends. Carter condemned Spud for his failure to stop Bully Ray from putting his aunt, TNA President Dixie Carter, through a table, EC3 would then publicly humiliate Spud by calling him a loser and slapping him in the face. In the end, Spud fought back and immediately punched Carter, and turning face in the process. Rather than physically retaliating, EC3 fired him from his position as the Carters' chief of staff. On 22 October episode of Impact Wrestling, Spud teamed up with Eric Young in a losing effort against EC3 and EC3's new ally Tyrus in a Tag Team tournament.

==== X Division Champion (2015–2017) ====
On 23 January 2015 episode of Impact Wrestling, Spud won the Feast or Fired match with an opportunity for the TNA X Division Championship. On 13 March episode of Impact Wrestling, Spud's feud with Carter ended in a Hair vs. Hair match, which Spud lost. The following week on 20 March episode of Impact Wrestling, Spud defeated Low Ki to win the X Division Championship. On 27 March episode of Impact Wrestling, he successfully defended his title against Low Ki in a rematch. On 1 May episode of Impact Wrestling, Spud lost his X Division Championship against Kenny King in a ladder match, also involving Tigre Uno and Mandrews. However, Spud won the title back on 29 May episode of Impact Wrestling during a Gauntlet match.

On 10 June episode of Impact Wrestling, Spud vacated the title to gain a title shot for the World Heavyweight Championship. That same day, Spud faced Kurt Angle for the TNA World Heavyweight Championship but failed to win the title. Later, he began feuding with Austin Aries. He defeated him on 5 August episode of Impact Wrestling in a name vs. career match, ending Aries's career at TNA. On 23 September episode of Impact Wrestling, Spud challenged his former rival Ethan Carter III for his TNA World Heavyweight Championship, in a losing effort. During late 2015, Spud took part in the first ever TNA World Title Series as a member of Group UK, on 7 October episode of Impact Wrestling, defeating Grado in the first round, thus earning him 3 points. He later failed to qualify for the Round of 16 following losses to both Drew Galloway and Bram who were also competing in Team UK.

In February, Spud started an alliance with his former rival Ethan Carter III in order to even things with Hardy and Tyrus, defeating them in a tag-team match on 16 February episode of Impact Wrestling. At 2016 Lockdown, Spud came out, supposedly to stop Reby Sky from attacking EC3. However, he would close the cage door on EC3 to help Matt Hardy retain his TNA World Heavyweight Championship, turning heel once again in the process. He would follow up, with encouragement from Matt Hardy, by delivering a conchairto to EC3 with his head on the steps. On 9 March 2016 episode of Impact Wrestling, Spud aligned with Matt Hardy and Tyrus to form a stable, after explaining his actions as getting revenge against Carter for his cruel treatment of him last year. The trio would go on to face EC3 and Jeff Hardy in a losing effort. On 29 March episode of Impact Wrestling, Matt Hardy, Rockstar Spud, Tyrus and Reby Hardy were defeated by Carter by disqualification in a Four On One Handicap match. On 10 May episode of Impact Wrestling, he was defeated by Carter in a Six Sides of Steel match. At May Mayhem, Spud and Tyrus were defeated by Jeff Hardy in a Ladder match. On 31 May episode of Impact Wrestling, Spud and Tyrus were defeated by The BroMans in a number one contendership match to challenge Decay for the TNA World Tag Team Championship at Slammiversary. On 21 June 2016 episode of Impact Wrestling, he challenged Braxton Sutter, Spud interrupting him when Sutter scheduled match against indy wrestler Balam. Sutter went on to defeat Spud and following his victory, was viciously attacked by Spud. During several months, Rockstar Spud and Braxton Sutter have many confrontation, during X Division matches. On 1 September edition of Impact Wrestling, Rockstar Spud viciously attacked Sutter with a chair during an Ultimate X match, and attacked him once again on 8 September edition of Impact Wrestling after his match against Drew Galloway, breaking one of his teeth. The feud ended in "Empty Arena, No Turnbuckles" match 15 September edition of Impact Wrestling, which was won by Sutter. At Bound for Glory, he participated in the Bound for Gold but was eliminated by Tyrus.

On 27 October episode of Impact Wrestling, Spud took part in the Team X Gold match teaming with Decay against DJ Z, Braxton Sutter and Mandrews ("Go for Broke"), in a losing effort. On 3 November episode of Impact Wrestling, Spud and Decay lost a three-way match against Go for Broke and The Helms Dynasty. They were defeated once again in a three-way tag team match against Go for Broke and The Helms Dynasty, this time in an elimination match. At "Total Nonstop Deletion", Spud was defeated by Broken Matt Hardy's son King Maxel. The same night, he lost at the Tag Team Apocalypto after his partner, Swoggle, attacked him. On 5 January episode Impact Wrestling, Spud called out Swoggle, seeking revenge for his betrayal but lost an impromptu match. A frustrated and angry Spud then ostensibly quit TNA. On 12 January 2017 episode of Impact Wrestling, Spud returned as Aron Rex's manservant, who was now portraying a "Liberace"-esque character. On 19 January 2017 episode of Impact, Aron Rex and Spud defeated Robbie E and Swoggle. The partnership with Rex abruptly ended due to the company's new management and Rex no longer being contracted with Impact Wrestling.

Spud was made the new ring announcer for Impact Wrestling. On the Impact broadcast aired on 27 April, Spud was viciously attacked with a hammer by Swoggle, who accidentally has his pants ripped off by Spud earlier in the night. This led to a feud which culminated on 29 June 2017 edition of iMPACT in a Mumbai Street Fight, where Spud revealed during the match that he did intentionally have Swoggle's pants ripped off. He, however, then accidentally ripped the pants off the referee(who was the size of Swoggle), eventually leading to him losing to Swoggle. On 30 October 2017, it was reported that Spud was officially released two or three weeks earlier by Impact Wrestling. Curtin reportedly requested the release himself after Impact told him the promotion would reduce his salary.

=== WWE (2017–present) ===
==== 205 Live General Manager (2017–2020) ====
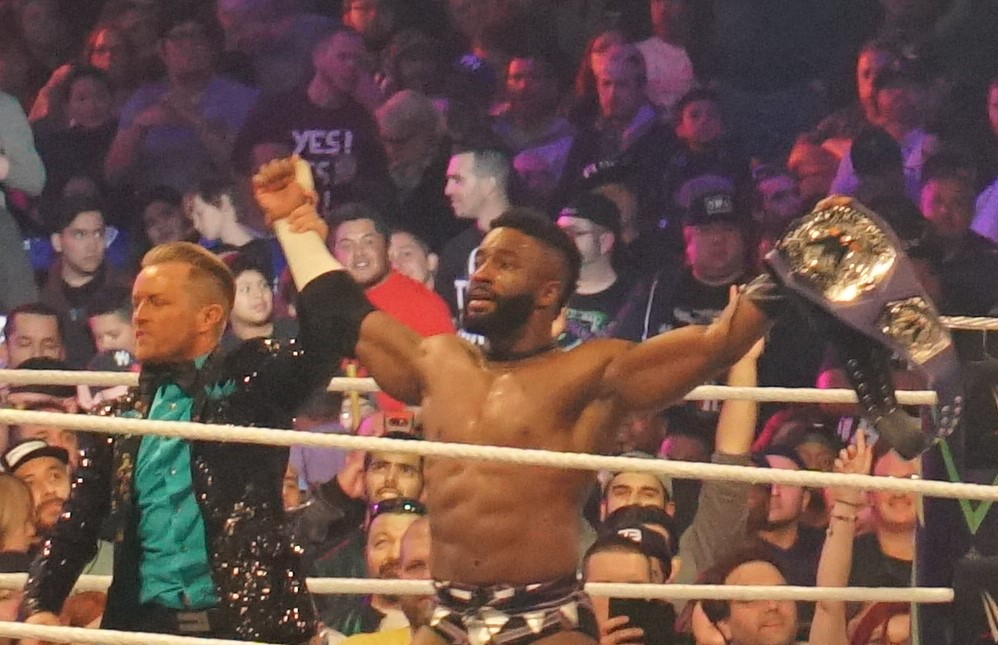
Maverick (left) congratulated Cedric Alexander after he won the WWE Cruiserweight Championship at WrestleMania 34

Curtin signed with WWE in October 2017, but had to postpone his debut until his U.S. work visa was renewed. On 30 January 2018 episode of 205 Live, he made his debut as a face under the ring name Drake Maverick and was appointed the new general manager of the brand. In his first appearance, he scheduled a 16-man WWE Cruiserweight Championship tournament that would culminate at WrestleMania 34.

On 3 September episode of Raw, Maverick accompanied the tag team AOP (Akam and Rezar) as their new manager, thus turning heel. On 5 November episode of Raw, Maverick led AOP to their first reign as Raw Tag Team Champions. At the Survivor Series pay-per-view, Maverick was in AOP's corner for their match against The Bar (Cesaro and Sheamus), threatened by The Bar's associate, Big Show, Maverick wetted his pants, distracting The Bar long enough to allow AOP to score the victory. On 10 December episode of Raw, AOP lost their title to Bobby Roode and Chad Gable in a three-on-two handicap match, that also involved Maverick. He quietly ended his partnership with AOP when Akam suffered an injury. While acting as a heel on the main roster, Maverick remained acting as a face general manager on 205 Live. In a dark match before the 9 April episode of SmackDown, Maverick managed EC3. However, the owner of WWE, Vince McMahon was reported to have disliked the match and manager spots, so the partnership was not brought to television.

Following the introduction of the WWE 24/7 Championship, Maverick chased the current holder of the championship on Raw, SmackDown and 205 Live throughout the next few months, becoming more active as a wrestler. During his title pursuit, Maverick would create flyers of whoever the current champion was and handed them out to fans, backstage personnel, and superstars in various places. WWE management liked Maverick's ideas and, in regard, gave him a little push. On 29 May episode of SmackDown, Maverick and R-Truth interrupted the Shane McMahon Appreciation Night in an impromptu match for the title, which Maverick lost. On 18 June, Maverick (disguised as R-Truth's ally Carmella) surprised R-Truth in the parking lot of the arena, pinned him for the title and immediately drove off in the referee's car. This marked his first championship win in WWE. Maverick also became the second holder - after R-Truth - to hold the title for over one day. However, he lost the title to R-Truth during his wedding, two days later. During the following episode of Raw, Maverick had a rematch against R-Truth for the title, but he was quickly defeated. On 1 July episode of Raw, Maverick attacked R-Truth with a suitcase and pinned him in the backstage area, while the latter was fleeing from a mob of wrestlers to become a two-time 24/7 Champion. However, Maverick lost the title to Truth 14 days later when Truth pinned him on his hotel room bed during his honeymoon. Throughout the following weeks, he would win and lose the title four times. As part of the 2019 WWE Draft, Maverick was drafted to SmackDown brand, though he would still serve as general manager of 205 Live.

==== NXT and second main roster run (2020–2021) ====
On 12 April 2020, Maverick was announced as a participant in the Interim NXT Cruiserweight Title Tournament, representing Group A in the tournament. On 15 April 2020, Maverick was originally released from his WWE contract as part of budget cuts stemming from the COVID-19 pandemic. Despite this, he was still expected to compete in the Interim Cruiserweight Title tournament. Maverick's release was put into his storyline for the tournament, as he continuously stated that he was not going to leave WWE without the Cruiserweight Championship. He would get into the finals against El Hijo del Fantasma, when he was defeated. After the match, Maverick was offered an NXT contract by Triple H which he signed immediately, re-hiring Maverick after he was originally supposed to only work the tournament.

Soon after, Maverick would form a tag team with Killian Dain. On 23 December episode of NXT, Maverick and Dain lost to NXT Tag Team Champions Danny Burch and Oney Lorcan in a Tag Team Street Fight match for the Tag Team titles. Following this, both Maverick and Dain entered the 2021 Dusty Rhodes Tag Team Classic, and they defeated Curt Stallion and August Grey in the first round on 15 January episode of 205 Live. However, the duo were eliminated in the second round by MSK on 27 January episode of NXT. On the NXT Takeover: Stand & Deliver pre-show, Maverick and Dain defeated Breezango (Tyler Breeze and Fandango) to earn a future NXT Tag Team Championship match. Maverick and Dain would receive their title opportunity on the following episode of NXT where they faced the reigning champions, MSK, in a losing effort. After the match Dain and Maverick were both attacked by Imperium. On 25 June, Dain was released from his WWE contract, thus disbanding the team. Maverick faced Ridge Holland on the premiere episode of NXT 2.0 on September 14 in a losing effort, marking his final appearance for the brand.

Maverick returned to the main roster after being drafted to the Raw brand as part of the 2021 Draft, and won the 24/7 Championship twice. He was once again released from WWE on 18 November.

==== Backstage roles (2022–present) ====
In February 2022, it was reported that Curtin had once again been rehired by WWE, now working as a member of their creative team.

== Other media ==
In January 2011, Curtin appeared as his Rockstar Spud character on BBC Three's Snog Marry Avoid, where he was given a "makeunder". He also played a small part as a clown in a short film called Light the Lights.

Curtin as Drake Maverick has appeared in the video games WWE 2K19 and WWE 2K20 as a manager.

=== Return to Independent Circuit (2026) ===
In September 2026, Maverick wrestled his first match since 2021. Returning in his Rockstar Spud persona, Maverick defeated Dave Mastiff, competing for Progress Wrestling.

== Personal life ==
On 8 September 2019 Curtin married American professional wrestler Renee Michelle.

Curtin is a supporter of Premier League football club Everton FC and the Nashville Predators ice hockey team.

== Championships and accomplishments ==
- Anti-Watershed Wrestling
  - AWW Heavyweight Championship (1 time)
- British Real Attitude Wrestling League
  - BRAWL Cruiserweight Championship (1 time)
- Future Championship Wrestling
  - FCW Tag Team Championship (1 time) – with Carlos
- Infinity Pro Wrestling
  - Infinity Trophy (1 time)
- International Pro Wrestling: United Kingdom
  - IPW:UK Cruiserweight Championship (1 time)
  - IPW:UK Tag Team Championship (1 time) – with Dragon Phoenix
  - Extreme Measures Tournament (2005)
- K-Star Wrestling
  - KSW Commonwealth Championship (1 time)
- Ohio Valley Wrestling
  - OVW Television Championship (1 time)
- One Pro Wrestling
  - 1PW Tag Team Championship (1 time) – with Dragon Phoenix
  - 1PW Openweight Championship (1 time)
- Pro Wrestling Illustrated
  - Ranked No. 100 of the top 500 singles wrestlers in the PWI 500 in 2016
- Revolution British Wrestling
  - RBW British Welterweight Championship (1 time)
- Revolution Pro Wrestling
  - RPW British Cruiserweight Championship (1 time)
  - Undisputed British Tag Team Championship (1 time) – with Dragon Phoenix
- River City Wrestling
  - RCW Championship (1 time)
- SAS Wrestling
  - SAS United Kingdom Championship (2 times)
  - SAS United Kingdom Title Tournament (2006)
- Southside Wrestling Entertainment
  - SWE Heavyweight Championship (1 time)
- Tri-County Association Pro Wrestling
  - TAP Junior Heavyweight Championship (1 time)
- Total Nonstop Action Wrestling
  - TNA X Division Championship (2 times)
  - British Boot Camp Winner (2013)
  - Feast or Fired (2015 – X Division Championship contract)
  - TNA World Cup (2015) – with Jeff Hardy, Gunner, Gail Kim, Davey Richards, and Crazzy Steve
  - Global Impact Tournament (2015) – with Team International (Drew Galloway, The Great Muta, The Great Sanada, Tigre Uno, Bram, Magnus, Sonjay Dutt, Khoya, and Angelina Love)
- Wrestling Association of Rugby
  - WAR Heavyweight Championship (1 time)
- WWE
  - WWE 24/7 Championship (8 times)
  - Bumpy Lifetime Achievement Award (2020)
- XWA Wrestling
  - XWA Flyweight Championship (1 time)
  - British Heavyweight Championship (1 time)
- HCW Championship Wrestling
  - HCW Rumblemania Winner (1 time)
- Xtreme Intense Championship Wrestling
  - XICW Midwest Heavyweight Championship (1 time)
- Gang Of 4 Promotions
  - Go4 Championship (1 time)

== Luchas de Apuestas record ==
Winner (wager)	Loser (wager)	Location	Event	Date	Notes
Ethan Carter III (hair)	Rockstar Spud (hair)	London, England	Impact Wrestling	January 31, 2015	Aired March 13, 2015
