= Jody Fleisch =

British professional wrestler

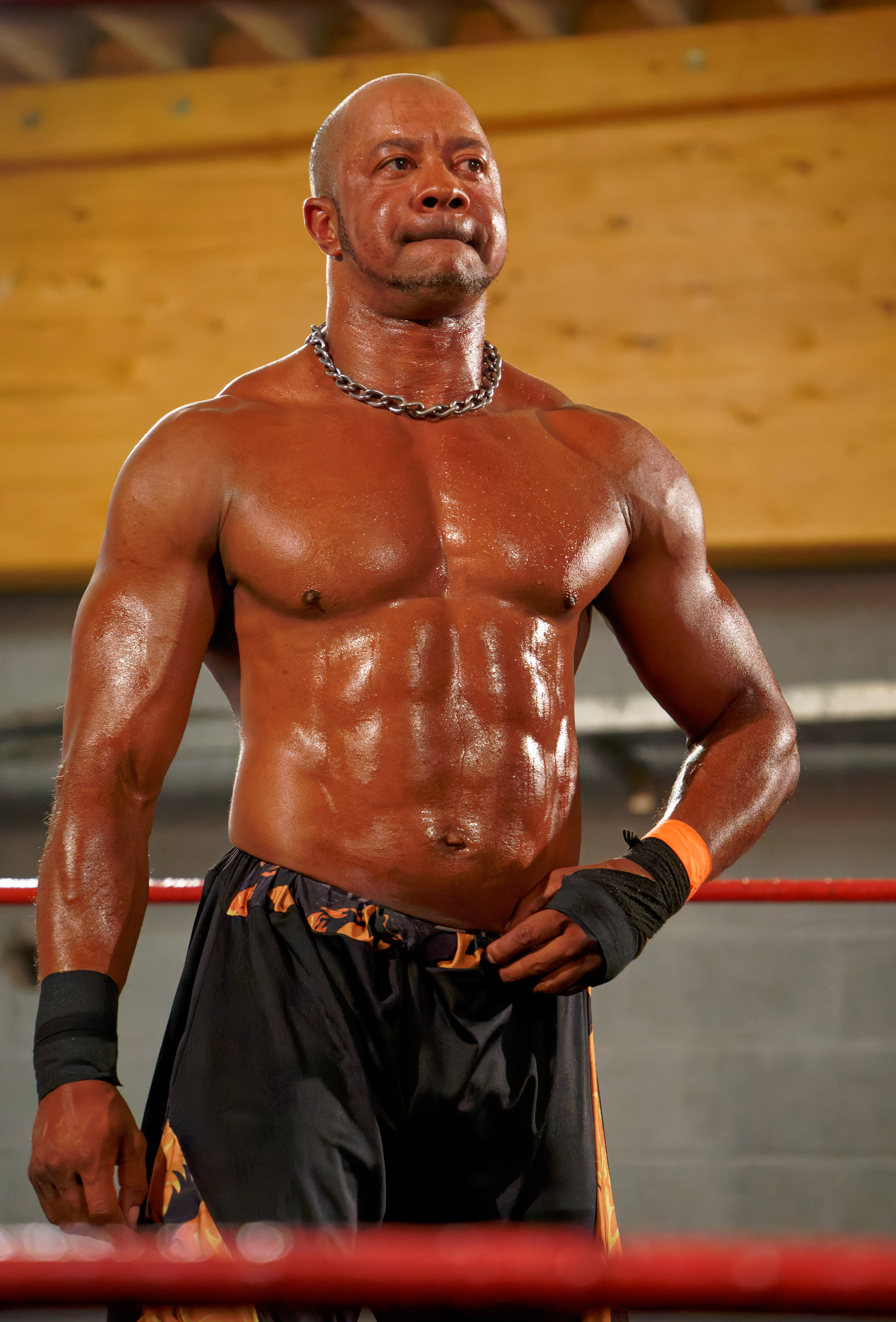
- Fleisch in 2022

Personal information
- Born: Jerome Fleisch; 2 April 1980 (age 46) Walthamstow, London

Professional wrestling career
- Ring name(s): Dakko Chan; Doc Chan; Jody Flash; Jody Fleisch
- Billed height: 5 ft 5 in (1.65 m)
- Billed weight: 154 lb (70 kg)
- Trained by: Dino Scarlo; Michinoku Pro Dojo
- Debut: 1996
- Retired: 2022

Jerome Fleisch (born 2 April 1980) is an English retired professional wrestler, better known by his ring name Jody Fleisch. He is best known for his work with the British promotions such as for Frontier Wrestling Alliance, One Pro Wrestling, Real Quality Wrestling, WhatCulture Pro Wrestling, All Star Wrestling, Preston City Wrestling, All Star Wrestling, Progress Wrestling and Revolution Pro Wrestling. He worked for independent promotions all over the world, having appeared for the likes of Pro Wrestling Guerrilla, Insane Championship Wrestling, Ring of Honor, Total Nonstop Action Wrestling, Westside Xtreme Wrestling, Absolute Intense Wrestling, Chikara, British Championship Wrestling, Over the Top Wrestling and many others.

== Professional wrestling career ==
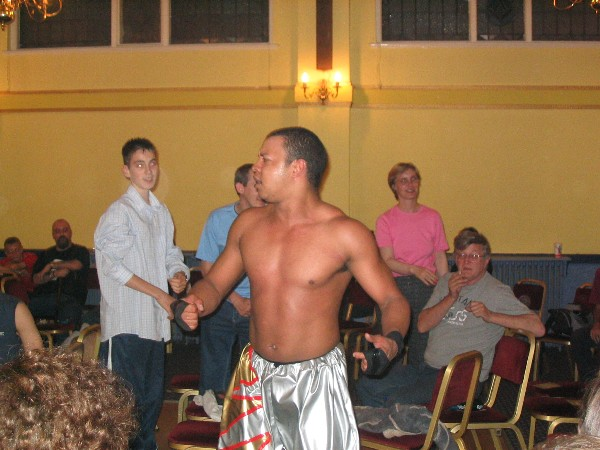
Fleisch in 2005

Fleisch studied Taekwondo, Ninjitsu and jujutsu for three years prior to his wrestling career. Aged 16, he made his wrestling debut for NWA UK Hammerlock, later forming a tag team with Jonny Storm. Fleisch continued wrestling in the UK for many years, as well as in the Netherlands, amongst other countries.

Fleisch made his first appearance for Michinoku Pro in Japan where he wrestled in the Fukumen World League 1999 as "Dakko Chan". In the finals, Dakko Chan lost his mask in a mask vs. mask match against the "White Bear" (Jason Cross).

In summer 2001, he sustained a serious elbow injury, suffered after an unsuccessful shooting star press. In February 2002, he made his return by winning Frontier Wrestling Alliance's King of England tournament, beating Doug Williams in the finals, before being presented with a medal by "Dynamite Kid" Tom Billington for his achievement.

In June 2002 Fleisch started taking bookings in the United States from companies like the Premier Wrestling Federation, Combat Zone Wrestling and Ring of Honor. During this time, Fleisch was involved in tournament matches for top honours in both ROH's Road To The Title and CZW's Best of the Best. Fleisch came close to winning these tournaments but ultimately failed. While back in England, Fleisch defeated Flash Barker to win the FWA Heavyweight title for the first time, only to be stripped of it on 3 August. On 13 October at FWA British Uprising Jody Fleisch beat Flash Barker again in a Ladder match to recapture the FWA Heavyweight title, during which Fleisch hit a jumping moonsault from a 12 feet high balcony onto Flash.

At FWA London Calling on 25 October, Christopher Daniels beat Fleisch and Doug Williams to capture the FWA Heavyweight title, and in the process became the first non-British wrestler to do so.

At ROH Final Battle, he defeated The Amazing Red and became part of the Special K stable, becoming a heel.

Throughout 2003, Fleisch wrestled mainly for both ROH and FWA, and in a cross promotional show between the two. During this time he faced stars such as Juventud Guerrera, Low Ki, Christopher Daniels, The Backseat Boyz, and James Tighe. In September of the same year, Fleisch was forced to retire due to injuries and personal issues, at the age of 23.

Fleisch made his return after a year's absence to sign the Jonny Storm Reinstatement petition, to aid his friend's return to the FWA promotion. After the main event (James Tighe versus AJ Styles), Fleisch was attacked by Tighe and Mark Belton. Fleisch would come out of retirement, entering a FWA ring to announce his full-time return to the promotion.

Since that time Jody Fleisch has appeared as one of England's top stars performing in promotions all across Europe for promotions like Irish Whip Wrestling, International Catch Wrestling Alliance, and IPW:UK, whilst also appearing at the Universal Uproar supershow. Fleisch went on to be a part of the 1 Pro Wrestling roster and become one half its tag team champions with long-time rival and friend Jonny Storm. He also made appearances during the first English tour of ROH in August 2006 and participated in the first King of Europe tournament in April 2007.

In 2009 Fleisch faced Último Dragón several times as part of the Nu-Wrestling Evolution promotion.

Between 2015 and 2019, Fleisch would work for Glasgow's Insane Championship Wrestling, debuting in a tag team victory with Storm over The Sumerian Death Squad (Tommy End and Michael Dante) in London. Fleisch made a number of appearances for ICW Fight Club and appeared on several ICW PPVs where he traded wins and losses with Super Crazy, James Storm, Andy Wild, Mark Coffey, Bram, Leyton Buzzard, Ricky Knight Jr., Mikey Whiplash, The Kinky Party (Jack Jester & Sha Samuels) and others. Though unsuccessful in his efforts, Fleisch was regularly in title contention for ICW as he twice challenged BT Gunn for the ICW Zero-G Championship and fought Lionheart for the ICW World Heavyweight Championship. He also participated in the 2017 Square Go! rumble match (won by Stevie Boy, who earned the title shot) and faced Joe Hendry, Ravie Davie, DCT, Kid Fite and Aaron Echo in a Seven Man Ladder match for ICW World Heavyweight & Zero-G title contendership at ICW Fear & Loathing X at the SSE Hydro which was won by Bram. Fleisch's final ICW appearance to date was an ICW Tag Team Championship match at ICW Shug's Hoose Party 6 where he teamed with Storm in a three way Tables, ladders, and chairs match against The Kings Of Catch (Aspen Faith and Lewis Girvan) and The Nine9 (Dickie Divers and Jack Morris) in which Faith & Girvan retained.

In 2018, Fleisch competed in Pro Wrestling Guerilla's Battle of Los Angeles, losing to CIMA in the first round.

== Championships and accomplishments ==
- Athletik Club Wrestling
  - ACW Cruiserweight Championship (1 time)
  - ACW Tag Team Championship (1 time) - with Jonny Storm
- Dynamic Over-The Top Action Wrestling
  - DOA UK Adrenaline Division Championship (1 time)
  - DOA UK Adrenaline Cup (2018)
- Frontier Wrestling Alliance
  - FWA British Heavyweight Championship (2 times)
  - FWA European Championship (1 time)
  - King Of England Tournament (2002)
- One Pro Wrestling
  - 1PW Tag Team Championship (1 time) – with Jonny Storm
- Pro Wrestling Illustrated
  - Ranked No. 419 of the top 500 singles wrestlers in the PWI 500 in 2018
- Scottish School Of Wrestling
  - SSW Hardcore Championship (1 time)
- The Wrestling Alliance
  - British Welterweight Championship (1 time)
- Ultimate Wrestling Alliance
  - UWA Tag Team Championship (1 time) - with Big Papa T
- Westside Xtreme Wrestling
  - wXw World Lightweight Championship (1 time)
- World Association of Wrestling
  - WAW World Light Heavyweight Championship (1 time)
- World Stars Of Wrestling
  - WSW Tag Team Championship (1 time) - with Jonny Storm
- WrestleForce
  - WrestleForce Tag Team Championship (1 time) - with Jonny Storm
- X Wrestling Alliance
  - XWA Frontier Sports Championship (1 time)
