= XWA (professional wrestling) =

British professional wrestling promotion

X Wrestling Alliance
- Acronym: XWA
- Founded: 2007
- Defunct: September 2018
- Style: Professional wrestling Sports entertainment
- Headquarters: Sudbury, Suffolk, United Kingdom
- Founder: Greg Lambert
- Owner: Dann Read
- Sister: Pro-Wrestling: EVE
- Predecessor: Frontier Wrestling Alliance
- Website: http://www.xwauk.com

XWA was a British professional wrestling promotion, based in the English southeast town of Sudbury, Suffolk. The XWA was formed in March 2007, following the demise of the Frontier Wrestling Alliance, and acted as a spiritual successor. XWA initially ran quarterly events in Morecambe using FWA titles and some former FWA talent. XWA had an extended hiatus between 2012 and 2014. After resuming operations in 2014, the promotion ran its final events in September 2018.

== History ==
=== Formation and Closure (2007–2012) ===
Following the closure of the Frontier Wrestling Alliance (FWA) after FWA v IPW:UK Final Frontiers at Orpington Halls, Kent on 25 March 2007, Greg Lambert called a press conference announcing that he was unhappy with the circumstances of the FWA's defeat, blaming Robbie Brookside for interfering and costing Flash Barker the Losing Promotion Must Close match with IPW representative Martin Stone. Lambert stated that he intended to start a new promotion, the XWA. In reality, Lambert had wanted to change the name of the promotion from FWA to XWA so he could run the promotion as a storyline-based, family-friendly product centred on its British stars, rather than the more 'American indie-style' company geared towards young adults and with a heavy reliance on overseas imports which the FWA had always been. In summer 2006, Lambert and his business partner Mark Kay agreed to 'put IPW:UK over' in a promotion versus promotion feud to give IPW a boost, and also to give a storyline reason for the demise of the FWA so they could make a completely fresh start.

The new promotion was named 'XWA' because it was close enough to the original name to ensure some semblance of continuity for their regular fans in Morecambe. Lambert said when the promotion was formed that the XWA stood for high quality British wrestling featuring the cream of UK wrestling talent on shows in the best UK wrestling venue (The Morecambe Dome) in front of the hottest crowd in UK wrestling, and also stood for the desire to keep the name of the FWA alive.

To this end, Lambert and Kay continued storylines in Morecambe where they left off when they promoted the first ever XWA show, XWA War on the Shore, on 7 April 2007. The last FWA British Heavyweight Champion, Robbie Brookside, was recognised as XWA British Heavyweight Champion. FWA Flyweight Champion Ross Jordan was now recognised as XWA British Flyweight Champion. However, other former FWA titles did not fall under the banner of the XWA. The XWA has also continued with names of live events that were formerly used by the FWA, such as Vendetta, Goldrush and War on the Shore.

On 11 April 2009 at XWA War on the Shore V, former FWA owner 'The Showstealer' Alex Shane made his return to the Morecambe Dome after a three-and-a-half-year absence. In an angle, British Heavyweight Champion Sam Slam handed Alex the old FWA Heavyweight Title belt which the XWA had continued to use as its main title belt ever since the XWA was formed. In exchange, Shane handed Slam the brand new XWA Title belt. This angle was conceived so Shane could once again take possession of the FWA Title belt ahead of the reformation of the FWA, which was announced a week afterwards and also to 'pass the torch' to Slam.

In July 2012 the XWA lost an inter-promotional feud to the North-West promotion Grand Pro Wrestling after XWA roster member Joey Hayes turned on his XWA teammates Rockstar Spud, Jack Clarke, Jynx and XWA British Heavyweight Champion Johnny Phere, giving the GPW team victory in the final elimination tag team contest.

Following this storyline, XWA went on an extended hiatus. All scheduled XWA shows were cancelled and all XWA titles were vacated.

=== Revival (2014–2018) ===
On 22 August 2014, Greg Lambert released a video of a telephone conversation between him and an unnamed person that revealed he had sold the XWA and that the promotion would be returning on 31 October 2014.

On 13 October, XWA released a video of Kay Lee Ray issuing an open challenge for XWA Please Don't Die on 1 November in Colchester. On 26 October The Suicidal, Suicidal, Suicidal Jimmy Havoc answered the challenge but added the stipulation of 'No Rules'.

On 31 October, XWA returned to The Delphi Centre in Sudbury, Suffolk for their first event in 2 years. Featured on this show was an 8-man tournament for the then vacant XWA British Heavyweight Championship. With Martin Stone defeating 'Loco' Mike Mason, Doug Williams defeating Jimmy Havoc, Damian O'Connor defeating Sam 'Slam' Naylor and James Castle defeating Lord Gideon Grey in a casket match. After the casket match, a dissatisfied Jimmy Havoc attacked James Castle taking him out of the title picture and entering himself back into the four way final. In non-tournament action, Pro-Wrestling: EVE Champion Nikki Storm defeated Kay Lee Ray after interference from Jimmy Havoc. In the four way final for the XWA British Heavyweight Championship Damian O'Connor defeated Jimmy Havoc after Kay Lee Ray returned the favour by interfering in his match.

At their next event 'Please Don't Die' on 1 November at the Liquid and Envy nightclub in Colchester, Essex. Nikki Storm successfully defended her Pro-wrestling: EVE Championship against Pollyanna, Damian O'Connor also successfully defended his XWA British Heavyweight Championship against both Paul London and Martin Stone and Kay Lee Ray defeated Jimmy Havoc in a No Rules match.

On 29 November, XWA made its debut at the Evoke nightclub in Chelmsford, Essex for 'We Need A Hero' Damian O'Connor defended the XWA British Heavyweight Championship against Chris Hero and Rhia O'Reilly won the Pro-Wrestling: EVE Championship from Nikki Storm in a No DQ match.

XWA returned to The Deplhi Centre in Sudbury, Suffolk on 6 February 2015 for 'Goldrush'. Damian O'Connor vs James Castle for the XWA British Heavyweight Championship ended in a no contest after Jimmy Havoc attacked both men with a chair. Rhia O'Reilly successfully defended the Pro-Wrestling: EVE Championship against Nikki Storm, And Jimmy Havoc won the Goldrush Rumble for a future championship match.

XWA ran its final shows in September 2018, all of which were co-promoted with Pro Wrestling EVE.

== Training centre ==
The XWA opened its first training centre at Regent Park Studios, Morecambe, in January 2009. The head trainer was formerly 'Deadly' Damon Leigh, who has stepped back from training due to responsibilities in his work as a Police Community Support officer. Training at the Morecambe school was headed up by Dave Rayne who also taught at the Manchester-based FutureShock School. The Centres were part of the British Wrestling Council. A second training school opened in Ipswich, Suffolk, in April 2009 under the management of Dann Read and head trainer Ashe.

== Championships ==
=== Final champions ===
Championship	Final champion	Date won	Event	Previous champion
XWA British Heavyweight Championship	Malik	18 August 2018	XWA 54: Everything Stops At 3 O'Clock	Rhia O'Reilly
XWA Frontier Sports Championship	Simon Grimm	23 July 2017	XWA 48	Vacant
Pro-Wrestling: EVE Championship	Rhia O'Reilly	30 June 2019	Pro-Wrestling: Wrestle Queendom	Sammii Jayne
XWA Flyweight Championship	Vacant	28 July 2012	XWA vs GPW Vendetta	Spud

=== Other accomplishments ===
Accomplishment	Latest winner	Date won
Goldrush	Cara Noir	11 March 2017
Best of the North West	Declan O'Connor	4 July 2009

== See also ==
- Professional wrestling in the United Kingdom
- List of professional wrestling promotions in the United Kingdom
