= King of the Deathmatch =

King of the Deathmatch is a professional wrestling tournament or championship contested under hardcore rules.

- IWA Japan's King of the Deathmatch
- IWA Mid-South's King of the Deathmatch
- Xtreme Pro Wrestling's King of the Deathmatch Championship
