= British Heavyweight Championship (XWA) =

Professional wrestling championship

XWA British Heavyweight Championship

Details
- Promotion: XWA; Frontier Wrestling Alliance
- Date established: 11 July 1999
- Date retired: 07 October 2018

Other name(s)
- FWA British Heavyweight Championship (1999–2007); XWA British Heavyweight Championship (2007 – current)
Statistics
- First champion(s): Mark Sloan
- Final champion(s): Malik
- Most reigns: Jody Fleisch, Doug Williams, Alex Shane, Johnny Phere, Thomas Dawkins/Cara Noir (2 reigns)
- Longest reign: Damian O'Connor (653 days)
- Shortest reign: Johnny Phere (<1 day)
- Oldest champion: Robbie Brookside (40 years, 4 months)
- Youngest champion: Mark Sloan (21 years, 4 days)
- Heaviest champion: Damian O'Connor (295 lb (134 kg; 21.1 st))
- Lightest champion: Lion Kid (110 lb (50 kg; 7.9 st))

The British Heavyweight Championship is a professional wrestling championship contested for in the XWA. The championship was originally created and contested for in the Frontier Wrestling Alliance (FWA) but moved to XWA when the former company became defunct. It has also been contested for in Ring of Honor (ROH) due to a working relationship between them and FWA.

== History ==
The first Champion was Mark Sloan, who defeated Paul Glory in a tournament final on 11 July 1999. Jody Fleisch was the first person to win the belt twice after being stripped of it, while American wrestler Christopher Daniels was the first non-British person to win the belt and go on to defend it on foreign soil.

Originally the belt was mostly defended under two out of three falls match rules, as was the tradition in British wrestling. This changed on 12 April 2005, when champion Alex Shane signed a cast-iron contract to make new FWA British Title rules official and permanent making all future championship matches simply one fall.

On 13 May 2006 the FWA British Heavyweight Title belt was stolen from the Morecambe Dome immediately following the FWA event at the venue during an FWA versus All-Star Wrestling show. Due to being stolen a new belt had to be created. When the FWA was forced to retire in its interpromotional war with International Pro Wrestling: United Kingdom, the XWA carried the lineage of the championship simply renaming it the British Heavyweight Championship and using the same physical belt. However, in April 2009, XWA founder Greg Lambert announced the creation of a new British Heavyweight Championship that did not bear the FWA initials and gave the original belt back to Alex Shane in time for the resurrection of the FWA.

On 17 February 2018 Rhia O’Reilly became the first woman to hold the title, defeating Cara Noir in an inter-promotional show with Pro Wrestling: EVE.

== Reigns ==
No.	Champion	Reign	Date	Days held	Location	Event	Notes	Ref.
1	Mark Sloan	1	11 July 1999	231	Portsmouth, Hampshire	No Surprises	Defeated Paul Glory in a tournament final	
2	Alex Shane	1	27 February 2000	129	Birmingham, West Midlands	Black Country Chaos	Two out of three falls match	
3	Guy Thunder	1	5 July 2000	8	Hertford, Hertfordshire	Live event	Two out of three falls match	
-	Vacant	-	13 July 2000			N/A		
4	Justin Richards	1	5 August 2000	259	Halifax, West Yorkshire	Evil Intentions	Defeated Scottie Rock, Guy Thunder & Jorge Castano in a four-way match	
-	Vacant	-	21 April 2001		Bolton, Greater Manchester	When Thunder Strikes	Stripped for missing title defence	
5	Doug Williams	1	19 May 2001	307	Portsmouth, Hampshire	High Potential	Defeated Scott Parker in a tournament final	
6	Flash Barker	1	22 March 2002	128	Walthamstow, London	Urban Legends	Two out of three falls match	
7	Jody Fleisch	1	28 July 2002	6	Portsmouth, Hampshire	No Surprises	Two out of three falls match	
-	Vacant	-	3 August 2002			N/A		
8	Jody Fleisch	2	13 October 2002	12	Bethnal Green, London	British Uprising	Defeated Flash Barker in a ladder match	
9	Christopher Daniels	1	25 October 2002	148	Walthamstow, London	London Calling	Defeated Jody Fleish & Doug Williams in a three-way match	
10	Doug Williams	2	22 March 2003	602	Philadelphia, PA	Night of Champions		
11	Alex Shane	2	13 November 2004	449	Coventry, West Midlands	British Uprising 3		
12	Hade Vansen	1	5 February 2006	160	Hoddesdon, Hertfordshire	New Frontiers	Defeated Alex Shane, Joe Legend, Jody Fleisch and Jonny Storm in The Champion Series five-way match	
13	Robbie Brookside	1	15 July 2006	266	Morecambe, Lancashire	Summer Classic	Defeated Hade Vansen & Jonny Storm in a no-disqualification three-way match. Championship renamed British Heavyweight Championship	
14	Jonny Storm	1	7 April 2007	455	Morecambe, Lancashire	War On The Shore 3		
15	Stevie Knight	1	5 July 2008	63	Morecambe, Lancashire	Vendetta 2008	Defeated Jonny Storm, Sam Slam, and Johnny Phere in a Final Four match	
16	Sam Slam	1	6 September 2008	371	Morecambe, Lancashire	Last Fight at the Prom 2008		
17	Spud	1	12 September 2009	203	Morecambe, Lancashire	Last Fight at the Prom 2009	Spud becomes XWA's first double champion by holding the British Flyweight Championship before this match	
18	Johnny Phere	1	3 April 2010	0	Morecambe, Lancashire	War On The Shore 6		
19	Alex Shane	3	3 April 2010	553	Morecambe, Lancashire	War On The Shore 6		
20	Johnny Phere	2	8 October 2011	294	Morecambe, Lancashire	Last Fight At The Prom 2011		
-	Vacant	-	28 July 2012		Morecambe, Lancashire	XWA vs GPW Vendetta	The company went on hiatus after being defeated by GPW	
21	Damian O'Connor	1	31 October 2014	653	Sudbury, Suffolk	XWA Revival	Defeated Doug Williams, Martin Stone and Jimmy Havoc in a Four-way match	
22	Lion Kid	1	14 August 2016	81	Colchester, Essex	XWA 42: The Summer Supershow		
23	Thomas Dawkins	1	27 November 2016	104	Colchester, Essex	XWA 44: Go Big!	Defeated Paul London and Lion Kid in a triple threat match	
-	Vacant	-	11 March 2017		Colchester, Essex	XWA 45: Goldrush	Vacated after interference from a mystery assailant on behalf of the champion, the winner of the Goldrush rumble later in the evening would become the new champion	
24	Cara Noir	2	11 March 2017	365	Colchester, Essex	XWA 45: Goldrush	Formerly Thomas Dawkins	
25	Rhia O'Reilly	2	17 February 2018	160	Bethnal Green, London	XWA 51: WrestleFriends: Equal Fights!		
26	Malik	2	18 August 2018	50	Bethnal Green, London	XWA 54: Everything Stops At 3 O'Clock		
-	Retired	-	07 October 2018					

== Combined reigns ==
Rank	Champion	No. of reigns	Combined days
1	Doug Williams	2	909
2	Damian O'Connor	1	653
3	Alex Shane	2	578
4	Thomas Dawkins/Cara Noir	2	469
5	Jonny Storm	1	455
6	Lion Kid	1	399
7	Sam Slam	1	371
8	Johnny Phere	2	294
9	Robbie Brookside	1	266
10	Justin Richards	1	259
11	Mark Sloan	1	231
12	Spud	1	203
13	Hade Vansen	1	160
14	Rhia O'Reilly	1	160
15	Christopher Daniels	1	148
16	Flash Barker	1	128
17	Stevie Knight	1	63
18	Malik	1	50
19	Jody Fleisch	2	18
20	Guy Thunder	1	8

== See also ==
- Professional wrestling in the United Kingdom
