= Professional wrestling tournament =

Type of tournament

On various occasions in professional wrestling, a single-elimination tournament of varying match types are held, often to determine a champion for a vacant or newly-created championship, to determine the number-one contender for a championship, to determine the participants in a future championship match, or is held with no championship or future championship match qualification attached to winning, such as in most editions of the King of the Ring tournament. Sometimes promotion (especially in earlier eras of wrestling) may use a title tournament that are fictitious in nature (that is, the title may have been simply awarded under the pretext of winning a tournament elsewhere) - notable ones include the tournaments that established the WWE World Heavyweight Championship, the WWE Intercontinental Championship, and the WWE United States Championship (the latter when it was the NWA United States Championship).

In tournaments with a fixed bracket, a multiple-disqualification or a multiple-countout eliminates all parties involved, and those who are slated to face the winner of such a match simply partakes in a match with one less opponent (or simply does not wrestle, if no opponents remain). Tournaments, however, rarely have a final match where only one such finalist remain, with no others qualifying for the final round.

Tournaments may employ a single match type throughout, or may vary match by match or round by round.

== Notable tournaments from active promotions ==
=== World Wrestling Federation/Entertainment ===
- King of the Ring

King of the Ring is a World Wrestling Entertainment event held initially in 1985 and evolving into its own pay-per-view event in 1993. The weeks leading to the tournament were often filled with qualifying matches, while only the semifinal and final rounds (and occasionally, the quarterfinal round) made it to the actual King of the Ring PPV card. The tournament (but not the event) made its return in April 2006 where all the matches would be contested as part of the SmackDown brand. It was again used in 2008 and 2010 during an episode of WWE Raw. In 2015, a two night tournament was held, beginning on the April 27 episode of Raw, with the semifinals and final airing as a special on the WWE Network the next night.

- Brawl for All

The Brawl For All was a shoot (unscripted) contest held in the World Wrestling Federation that took place from June 29 to August 24, 1998.

- Deadly Game

At the 1998 edition of the Survivor Series pay per view, a fourteen-man tournament billed as the Deadly Games tournament was held to determine the WWF Champion The title had been vacated earlier in the year. The Rock won the tournament and the title.

- Road to WrestleMania

This was an eight-man tournament to determine a number one contender for the WWE Championship at WrestleMania. Held in both 2005 and 2006 a few months before that year's WrestleMania.

- WWE Women's Championship Tournament

This was a seven Diva tournament to determine a new Women's Champion due to the title being vacated by Trish Stratus following her winning the title in her last match as a full time performer. Lita defeated Mickie James in a Diva Lumberjack match at the 2006 Cyber Sunday to win the tournament and the title.

- United States Championship

This eight-man tournament was to determine the first United States Champion of the WWE era (the title was originally a WCW championship, which was reactivated). Eddie Guerrero won, defeating Chris Benoit in the finals.

- WrestleMania IV

A fourteen-man tournament was held at the event for the vacant WWF Championship. The first round only had twelve competitors, however Hulk Hogan and André the Giant received byes into the quarterfinals, increasing the field to fourteen. Randy Savage won the tournament by defeating Ted DiBiase in the finals.

- The Wrestling Classic

A sixteen-man tournament held in November 1985. Junkyard Dog defeated Randy Savage to win the tournament.

- Gold Rush Tournament

An eight man tournament used to determine the number one contender for the World Heavyweight Championship, held in May 2005. Edge defeated Kane in the finals to win the tournament. A second Gold Rush tournament was held on NXT in 2012 to crown the first ever NXT Champion. Seth Rollins won the tournament and the championship, defeating Jinder Mahal on the August 29 edition of NXT.

- Intercontinental Championship

When Drew Mcintyre was fired from the WWE, the title became vacant, so the WWE organized an Intercontinental Championship tournament. Kofi Kingston was the winner, but Drew returned and was reinstated as the Intercontinental Champion, so Kingston became the number one contender.

- WWE Championship

After CM Punk won the WWE Championship by defeating John Cena at WWE Money in the Bank and walked out of the company with the title, Vince McMahon set up a tournament to decide a new champion the following night on Raw. A week later in the final, Rey Mysterio defeated The Miz in the opening match of the broadcast to become WWE Champion. However, Mysterio would lose the title later that night to Cena, who would win the title for a WWE record ninth time. CM Punk then returned to the WWE with the title he won, meaning that, for the first time in WWE history, two men had a claim to the championship. The issue was settled at SummerSlam where Punk won a controversial rematch with Cena to become Undisputed Champion, though he would lose the title to Raw Money In The Bank winner Alberto Del Rio seconds later.

=== Total Nonstop Action Wrestling ===
- Chris Candido Cup

A memorial TNA tag team tournament was held in 2005 in memory for Chris Candido, which featured teams consisting of one established veteran and one young rookie, representing Candido's veteran status at a young age and his commitment to working with and helping younger wrestlers.

- TNA Hard 10 Tournament

This was a Hardcore tournament featured in Total Nonstop Action Wrestling, where a wrestler must build over 10 points and be 2 points above the opponent to win the match. Points are awarded for using a weapon (1 point), and putting an opponent though a table (5 points).

- Super X-Cup

This was a TNA tournament for the X-Cup, featuring X Division superstars from around the world. Super X-Cup Tournaments have been held in 2003 and 2005 (Christopher Daniels Invitational).

- America's X-Cup

This was a TNA tournament-like event, first seen in 2004, where two four-man teams have 4 singles matches, 2 tag team matches, and one 8-man tag elimination. The singles matches are worth 1 point, the tag teams are worth 2 and the Elimination is worth 4. To win you must have the most points. The Tournament would later become the World X-Cup.

- World X-Cup

With a point based system like the America's X-Cup, the World X-Cup would see four teams enter at the same time competing in a variety of matches; firstly a Gauntlet Battle Royal, where the last two remaining would earn a point for their team and would compete against each other for a further two points, next tag team matches for two points, following this a ladder match where a member from each team would compete for three points. from her the team with the lowest score would be removed allowing one member from each team to compete in an Ultimate X match for the final 3 points.

- Fight for the Right Tournament

This setup starts with a reverse battle royal with 18 wrestlers trying to be among the first seven to get into the ring over the top rope. Those seven then compete with traditional TNA battle royal rules to determine tournament seeding. The final two in the ring go to pin or submission with the winner getting a bye into the tournament final. The other six compete in singles matches with the winners facing each other in a three-way match with the winner facing the wrestler who received the bye.

=== Ring of Honor ===
- Field of Honor

This was a Ring of Honor tournament held in 2003. Matt Stryker came out as the winner.

- Survival of the Fittest

Ring of Honor held this one-night tournament in 2004, 2005, 2006, 2007, 2009 and 2012 with the winners being Bryan Danielson, Roderick Strong, Delirious, Chris Hero, Tyler Black and Jay Lethal respectively.

- ROH Championship

This tournament was held in 2002 to crown ROH's first champion. Low Ki emerged victorious.

- ROH Pure Wrestling Championship

In February 2004, A.J. Styles won this tournament to become the first Pure Champion.

=== Combat Zone Wrestling ===
- CZW Best of the Best

This is a tournament held in the Combat Zone Wrestling promotion. The annual Best of The Best was originally a junior heavyweight tournament, which in 2005 was repurposed as an all weight tournament.

- CZW Tournament of Death

This is CZW's version of the King of the Deathmatch, 8 superstars start out, each match has an extreme variation.

=== Pro Wrestling Guerrilla ===
- Bad Ass Mother 3000

The Bad Ass Mother 3000 was a tournament held on August 29 and 30, 2003, in Eagle Rock, California and City of Industry, California. The winner of the tournament would become the inaugural PWG Champion.

- Tango and Cash Invitational

The Tango & Cash Invitational was a tag team tournament held on January 24 and 25, 2004, in Santa Ana, California. The winners of the tournament would be crowned the first ever PWG Tag Team Champions.

- Battle of Los Angeles

This is an annual tournament held by Pro Wrestling Guerrilla. Over the years, the tournament has attracted numerous famous independent wrestlers from A.J. Styles and Christopher Daniels to Bryan Danielson. The tournament is infamous for having many of its winners never receiving the title shot they're promised for winning (although Chris Bosh, the winner of the 2005 tournament, did receive his). In 2009 the tournament was contested for the then vacant PWG Championship.

- Dynamite Duumvirate Tag Team Title Tournament (DDT4)

The Dynamite Duumvirate Tag Team Title Tournament (DDT4) is an annual tag team tournament contested for the PWG World Tag Team Championship. If the title isn't vacant, the reigning Champions will be forced to enter the tournament and defend their titles in every one of their matches. The tournament was created in 2007 after Quicksilver (then one half of the PWG Tag Team Champions) was forced to retire and thus the titles became vacant.

=== Chikara ===
- King of Trios

King of Trios is a three-night tournament promoted by Chikara. In King of Trios, there are trios that will compete in six-man tag team matches to see which of them will advance. All in all, sixteen trios competed in the tournament, making for a total of forty-eight competitors. The tournament marked the 2007 season premiere of the promotion. The three nights of the 2007 tournament took place on February 16, 2007 in Hellertown, Pennsylvania, February 17 in Barnesville, Pennsylvania, and February 18 in Philadelphia, Pennsylvania. The 2008 King of Trios tournament was held at the New Alhambra Arena in Philadelphia, Pennsylvania. This time the tournament featured 28 teams, up from the 16 of 2007. The 2009 King of Trios tournament only had 16 teams due to the financial troubles of last year (down from the 28 of last year). Since 2009, the tournament has only featured 16 teams.

- Chikara Young Lions Cup

A tournament is held every year to determine the champion. The primary basis for eligibility was later changed to age, making the tournament open only to wrestlers who are 25 years old or younger. The winner of the Young Lions Cup can defend the cup as an actual title until the following tournament, and Young Lions Cup tournament winners are not allowed to compete in the tournament again once they win it.

- Torneo cibernetico

The match is a 16-man elimination tag team match consisting of 2 teams of 8. It uses standard Lucha Libre tag-team rules with elimination occurring with a pinfall, submission, disqualification and count out. A special 'batting' system is also used in which the wrestlers are given a specific order and may only tag in and out in this order. If two or more men from the same team remain, they must face each other to determine one individual winner.

- Rey de Voladores

CHIKARA used to have this as a stand alone event in 2007 and 2008, then it was included in the King of Trios weekend in 2009. It is a "King of Flyers" mini tournament featuring the more agile wrestlers that are out of the King of Trios tournament itself. In 2007 and 2008, the tournament features eight wrestlers and holds two Fatal Four-Way elimination matches. The winner of both matches goes on to wrestle on the next night to crown the King of Flyers. Since 2009, the Fatal Four-Way matches have been held on Night 2 of King of Trios and the finals being held on Night 3.

- La Lotería Letal

In English, La Lotería Letal means The Lethal Lottery. It is a tag team tournament that was held in autumn 2008. It consisted of eight teams, who competed in a single-elimination tournament. To determine the participants in the tournament, eighteen CHIKARA regulars and other independent wrestlers. Names were drawn at random to form tag teams and determine the match pairings. The two remaining wrestlers, faced each other in a singles match at the September 6 event.

- Tag World Grand Prix

The Tag World Grand Prix is a tag team professional wrestling tournament that was held in 2003, 2005, 2006, and 2008. In 2003 was the first Tag World Grand Prix tournament. Twelve teams entered the tournament with the finals being scheduled in a three-way dance format. In 2005, the number of participating teams was expanded to 32. In 2006 was to crowned CHIKARA's first-ever Campeones de Parejas (Tag Team Champions). The tournament was won by The Kings of Wrestling (Chris Hero and Claudio Castagnoli). In 2008 was to date the final Tag World Grand Prix tournament. The tournament was held in Oberhausen, Germany. This time only 12 teams entered the tournament, with the finals being scheduled to be contested under three-way elimination match.

== Notable tournaments from defunct promotions ==
=== Stampede Wrestling ===
- Alberta Gold Belt Tournament

The Alberta Gold Belt Tournament was an eight-man single-elimination tournament held in Stampede Wrestling that took place on June 4, 1955.

- Stampede International Tag Team Title Tournament

A Stampede Wrestling tournament was held where multiple wrestlers fought in an eight-team tournament for the Stampede Wrestling International Tag Team Championship.

=== World Championship Wrestling ===
- Cruiserweight Tag Team Championship

A WCW tournament was held where multiple Cruiserweight Tag Teams fought in an eight-team tournament for the WCW Cruiserweight Tag Team Championships.

- United States Championship

In the NWA/WCW era (which precedes the title's WWE era mentioned above), there had been 9 tournaments to fill the title vacancy (not counting the fictitious "tournament" in early 1975 that enabled Harley Race to be billed as the first champion). All the tournaments were single-elimination. The finals have been as follows:

  - Terry Funk over Paul Jones - The first 16-man tournament ever to determine the champion.
  - Jimmy Snuka over Ricky Steamboat
  - Sgt. Slaughter over Ricky Steamboat
  - Barry Windham over Nikita Koloff
  - Sting over Steve Austin
  - Dustin Rhodes over Rick Steamboat - originally the final a No. 1 contendership tournament, it became a title deciding match when Rick Rude was injured.
  - Sting over Meng - a 16-man tournament, marred by the elimination of both Ric Flair and Randy Savage in their semifinal bracket. Sting vs. Meng, which was the other semifinal bracket, became the final instead.
  - Scott Steiner over Booker T
  - Scott Steiner over Sting
- Jim Crockett, Sr. Memorial Cup Tag Team Tournament

The Jim Crockett, Sr. Memorial Cup Tag Team Tournament was an invitational tag team tournament.

- Bunkhouse Stampede

A series of tournaments where wrestlers competed for Bunkhouse points which would allow them to qualify for the Bunkhouse stampede finals.

  - Hardcore Junkyard Invitational Tournament (1999)
  - WCW EUROPEAN TITLE Tournament (1994)
  - WCW BATTLEBOWL CHAMPIONS Tournament
  - Pat O'Connor Memorial International Cup Tag Team Tournament
  - WCW KING OF CABLE TOURNAMENT
  - WCW EUROPEAN CUP

== Other promotions ==
=== Progress Wrestling ===
- ECWA Super 8 Tournament

This is an annual tournament held by the East Coast Wrestling Association. The eight man tournament is known for jump-starting the careers of many indy wrestlers, often booking veterans (ex. Billy Kidman) and relatively unknown wrestlers (ex. Eric Matlock) alike.

- FWA Flyweight Championship

On June 30, 2003, Ross Jordan won a tournament to become Frontier Wrestling Alliance's first flyweight champion.

- Grand Prix

Exclusive to the UWA, the Grand Prix tournament starts out with eight wrestlers, the winner gets a UWA Canadian Championship shot at a future event.

- King of the Deathmatch

This is an eight-man tournament with extreme violence. Each match has an extreme variation. Most famous tournaments based on this include the IWA JAPAN 1995 King of the Death, and CZW's Tournament Of Death. Also the IWA Mid South holds an annual KOTDM featuring sixteen men.

- Ted Petty Invitational

The Ted Petty Invitational tournament (the TPI) was an independent wrestling tournament in North America, run and promoted by Independent Wrestling Association Mid-South. Created as the Sweet Science Sixteen in 2000 by Ian Rotten, the tournament was originally supposed to showcase the top technical independent wrestlers. After the death of Ted Petty in September 2002, Rotten changed the name to honor his friend. The tournament was expanded to 24 participants, with a three-way final, in 2003. Over the years, the tournament has attracted numerous famous independent wrestlers from Ken Anderson, A.J. Styles to James Gibson.

- World Tag Team Tournament

This was an American Wrestling Association tournament for their AWA World Tag Team Championships in Rochester, Minnesota on October 1, 1989.

- ECCW Pacific Cup

Since 2000, ECCW has held an annual tournament called the ECCW Pacific Cup, considered to be the Canadian equivalent of such American tournaments as the East Coast Wrestling Association's Super 8 Tournament. The first edition of the tournament took place on November 24, 2000, in New Westminster, with Asian Cougar defeating Havoc and Tony Kozina in the final; beginning with the 2002 edition (it was not held in 2001), the event was moved closer to the start of the year and alternated between Surrey and Vancouver in later years. As well, in 2004 ECCW held the first, and so far only, tag version of the Pacific Cup.

== See also ==
- All Japan Pro Wrestling tournaments
- All Pro Wrestling tournaments
- AWA tournaments
- ECW tournaments
- New Japan Pro Wrestling tournaments
- Pro Wrestling Guerrilla tournaments
- Lucha Underground tournaments
- Ohio Valley Wrestling tournaments
- Ring of Honor tournaments
- Total Nonstop Action Wrestling tournaments
- WCW tournaments
- WWE tournaments
- Professional wrestling match types
