= Doug Williams (wrestler) =

British professional wrestler (born 1972)

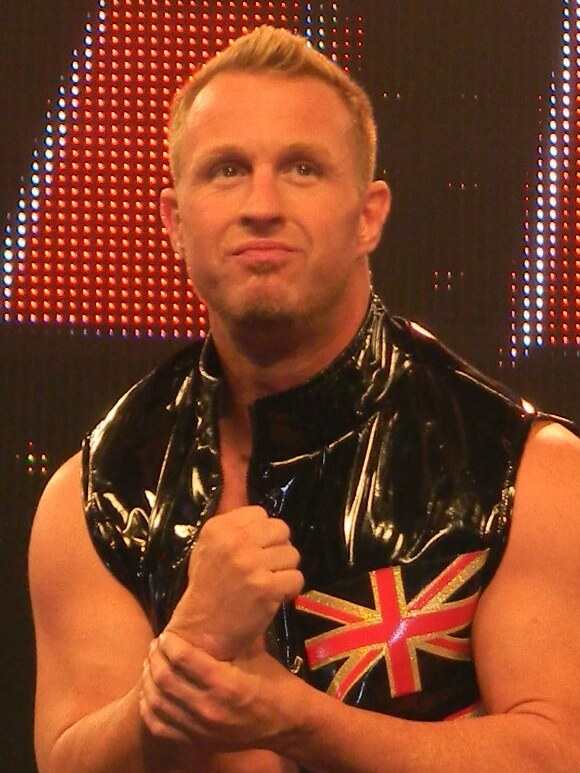
- Williams in 2010

Personal information
- Born: Douglas Clayton Durdle; 1 September 1972 (age 54) Reading, Berkshire, England

Professional wrestling career
- Ring name(s): Doug Williams; Douglas Williams
- Billed height: 5 ft 11 in (1.80 m)
- Billed weight: 240 lb (110 kg)
- Billed from: Reading, England; The United Kingdom (TNA)
- Trained by: NWA UK Hammerlock; Andre Baker; Dino Scarlo
- Debut: 1993
- Retired: June 17, 2023

Douglas Clayton Durdle (born 1 September 1972), known by his ring name Doug Williams, is an English retired professional wrestler. He is best known for his work in Total Nonstop Action Wrestling (TNA), where he was a one–time TNA Television Champion, two–time TNA X Division Champion and a two-time tag team champion, having held the TNA World Tag Team Championship and the IWGP Tag Team Championship once each as part of The British Invasion. He also worked as a trainer for TNA's developmental territory Ohio Valley Wrestling (OVW), where he was a one-time OVW Heavyweight Champion. Throughout his career, Williams has also worked in various promotions in the United Kingdom and abroad, including the Frontier Wrestling Alliance (FWA), One Pro Wrestling (1PW) and Pro Wrestling Noah.

== Professional wrestling career ==
=== Early career ===
Williams studied judo from the age of 11. Using this as his background, he began training to become a professional wrestler at the age of 16. At 19 Williams started working with NWA UK Hammerlock and became an active member of the roster during the mid-1990s, before moving on to FWA in 2001.

While competing in FWA's King of England tournament, Williams wrestled and won a match against Eddie Guerrero. Williams would also go on to become the promotion's top champion on two occasions. Williams wrestled against Martin Stone in the main event of the promotion's comeback show "New Frontiers" in August 2009, and has since become embroiled in the ongoing feud between Stone's faction "The Agenda" and the FWA Resistance.

By 2004, Williams would begin touring with Pro Wrestling Noah in Japan where he would become a Global Honored Crown Tag Team Champion with Scorpio.

Williams continued to win many foreign and local championships, even defeating "American Dragon" Bryan Danielson in the final of a tournament in Rethel, France on 6 May 2005 to become the first International Catch Wrestling Alliance World Heavyweight Champion.

While World Wrestling Entertainment was touring England in November 2006, Williams made a dark match appearance where he lost to Carlito.

Williams would also appear occasionally on television throughout 2007 and 2008 with British wrestling promotions whilst working with TNA Wrestling, due to the ruling their contracted wrestlers can appear in independent promotions that aren't televised in the USA.

=== Ring of Honor (2002–2007, 2015) ===
Williams went on a tour around the United States on several occasions making notable appearances in Ring of Honor over the course of several years. He debuted for the promotion on 22 June 2002, defeating American Dragon. This victory earned Doug a shot at the ROH World Championship on 27 July 2002, which was fought under ironman rules in a four-way contest, which also featured Christopher Daniels, Low Ki and Spanky.

His return to Ring of Honor saw Williams regain the FWA British Heavyweight Championship from Christopher Daniels, on 22 March 2003, before unsuccessfully challenging Samoa Joe for the ROH World Championship on 26 April 2003. On 19 July 2003, Reckless Youth defeated Doug Williams in a pure wrestling challenge.

After another stint away, Williams returned on 14 February 2004 to defeat Chris Sabin in the pure wrestling tournament, but was later knocked out by CM Punk. On 17 July, in Elizabeth, New Jersey, Williams defeated Jay Lethal, Nigel McGuinness and R. J. Brewer, to qualify for the Pure Wrestling final. The final was contested later that evening, and saw Williams defeat Alex Shelley to capture the Pure Wrestling Championship. Williams had two successful defences of the Pure Wrestling Championship, defeating Shelley in a rematch on 23 July, and Austin Aries the following day. He would go on to lose the title to John Walters on 28 August.

On 11 September, Williams had another unsuccessful shot at the World Championship, which was also against Samoa Joe. On 13 May 2005, Williams once again wrestled in ROH when he teamed with Colt Cabana to defeat the team of Nigel McGuiness and Chad Collyer, before losing to Homicide the next day.

During ROH's tour of the United Kingdom in August 2006, Williams teamed with Jody Fleisch as "Team UK", defeating "Team Noah" (SUWA and Go Shiozaki). The second show of the tour took place in Broxbourne and saw Williams defeat Jimmy Rave.

Williams' last appearances in ROH were in 2007. On 13 April, Williams teamed with regular partner Nigel McGuinness to face then-World Champion Takeshi Morishima and Chris Hero in a tag team match. McGuinness pinned Hero to win the match for his team. The next night at Fighting Spirit on 14 April, Doug made it two for two by defeating Colt Cabana with his Chaos Theory finisher.

In November 2015, Williams was booked as part of a series of "Supershow" cross-promotion events between Preston City Wrestling and ROH in Preston, England. Williams was victorious against Silas Young on the first night but unsuccessful the second night in a match against Jay Lethal for the ROH World Championship.

=== Total Nonstop Action Wrestling ===
==== Sporadic appearances (2003, 2008) ====
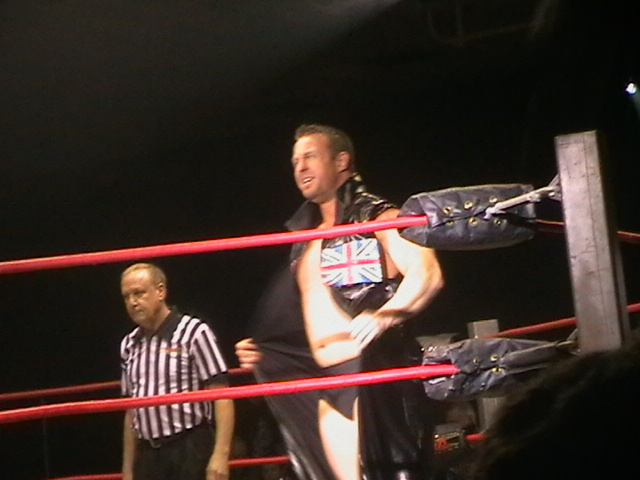
Williams at a TNA House Show in Dublin in January 2009

Williams wrestled James Storm on 26 March 2003 during TNA Xplosion. It was not until Williams was confirmed to have signed a contract with TNA Wrestling from 12 June 2008 that he became part of their roster to take part in TNA Wrestling's World X Cup.

Williams was part of TNA's UK tour, wrestling in all four shows. On 12 June 2008, in Liverpool, Williams teamed with Gail Kim, though they fell short in defeat to the team of Awesome Kong and "Cowboy" James Storm. On 13, 14 and 15 June, TNA held a second show in Liverpool, along with others in Coventry and Brentwood. Doug also wrestled on these shows, with multiple 3 Way Dances against Jay Lethal and A.J. Styles. Styles was victorious on all three occasions.

Williams represented Team International during the 2008 World X Cup tournament, where he defeated Team Japan's Masato Yoshino in his Impact! debut on 10 July 2008. He then wrestled in a 12-Man World X Cup elimination contest, at Victory Road. Williams returned to TNA at Turning Point where he competed in a X Division seeding match. He eliminated Jimmy Rave from the ten-man match, but in the end the eventual winner Eric Young eliminated him placing him third in the X Division rankings. Williams competed on TNA's 2009 Maximum Impact Tour in X Division matches.

==== British Invasion and World Elite (2009–2010) ====
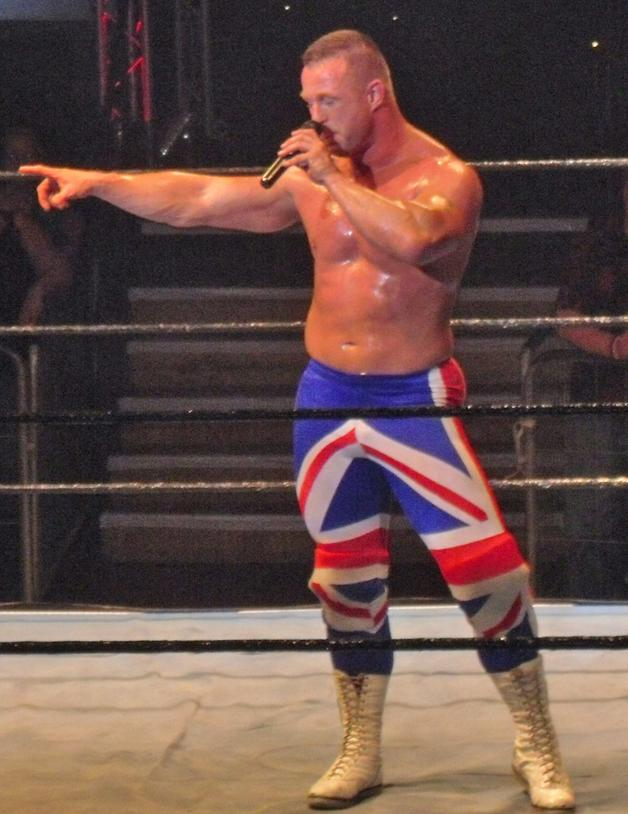
Williams in his British Invasion attire

Williams re-appeared on TNA television on 30 April 2009, episode of Impact!, as a member of The British Invasion faction, along with Brutus Magnus and Rob Terry. The British Invasion got to the final of the Team 3D Invitational Tag Team Tournament but lost to Beer Money, Inc. (James Storm and Robert Roode) at Sacrifice. In the dark match of Slammiversary, the British Invasion defeated Rhino and Eric Young. Later that evening, they interfered in the TNA World Tag Title match. At Victory Road, Team 3D retained their IWGP World Tag Team Titles against the British Invasion. On 25 July episode of Impact!, the British Invasion, Sheik Abdul Bashir and Kiyoshi defeated the TNA Originals after Eric Young turned on his team. After the match, Young, the British Invasion, Bashir and Kiyoshi formed World Elite. On 30 July episode of Impact!, Williams and Magnus won the IWGP Tag Team Championship by defeating Team 3D in a Tables Match. However, New Japan Pro-Wrestling would state that they still recognised Team 3D as the official champions since TNA did not have proper sanction to make the title change. On 10 August 2009, NJPW formally recognised the title switch. At Bound for Glory the British Invasion lost the IWGP Tag Team Titles back to Team 3D, but managed to win the TNA World Tag Team Titles in a four way Full Metal Mayhem Tag Team match against Booker T and Scott Steiner, Team 3D and Beer Money. The following month at Turning Point Williams and Magnus successfully defended the titles in a three-way match against Beer Money and The Motor City Machineguns (Alex Shelley and Chris Sabin). At Final Resolution they were once again able to retain their titles in a match against Shelley and Sabin. At Genesis the British Invasion lost the TNA World Tag Team Titles to Matt Morgan and Hernandez.

==== X Division and Television Champion (2010–2011) ====
On 28 January episode of Impact! Williams cashed in Rob Terry's "Feast or Fired" briefcase and used it to defeat Amazing Red for the TNA X Division Championship. Two days later Williams competed in his first Ultimate X match at a house show in London, successfully defending his new title against Daniels, Suicide, Amazing Red and Chris Sabin. On 18 February episode of Impact! Rob Terry grew tired of his stable mates' abuse and attacked Magnus, thus completing his face turn. At Destination X Williams successfully defended the TNA X Division Championship against Shannon Moore after hitting him with a brick and afterwards cut a promo, where he claimed to hate the current X Division, full of acrobats calling themselves wrestlers, before announcing that he was going to re-establish the division as a place for pure catch-as-catch-can wrestlers like himself. The British Invasion quietly disbanded after Magnus was taken off television following the event. On 5 April episode of Impact! Williams began using the ring name Douglas Williams. At Lockdown Williams was scheduled to defend his title in a three-way Steel Cage match against both Kazarian and Moore, but was forced to miss the event due to being unable to fly out of England after the country's airspace was closed following a volcano eruption in Iceland. At the event TNA announced that as a result of missing the show, Williams was stripped of the TNA X Division Championship. After missing two more weeks of Impact!, Williams returned on 3 May episode of Impact! and refused to hand the Championship belt over to the new champion, Kazarian, and claimed that he had to beat him for it at Sacrifice, to get it. Two weeks later at Sacrifice Williams defeated Kazarian to regain the TNA X Division Championship. The following month at Slammiversary VIII Williams successfully defended his TNA X Division Championship against Brian Kendrick, using a high flying manoeuvre, a tornado DDT, despite his previous anti–high flying statements.

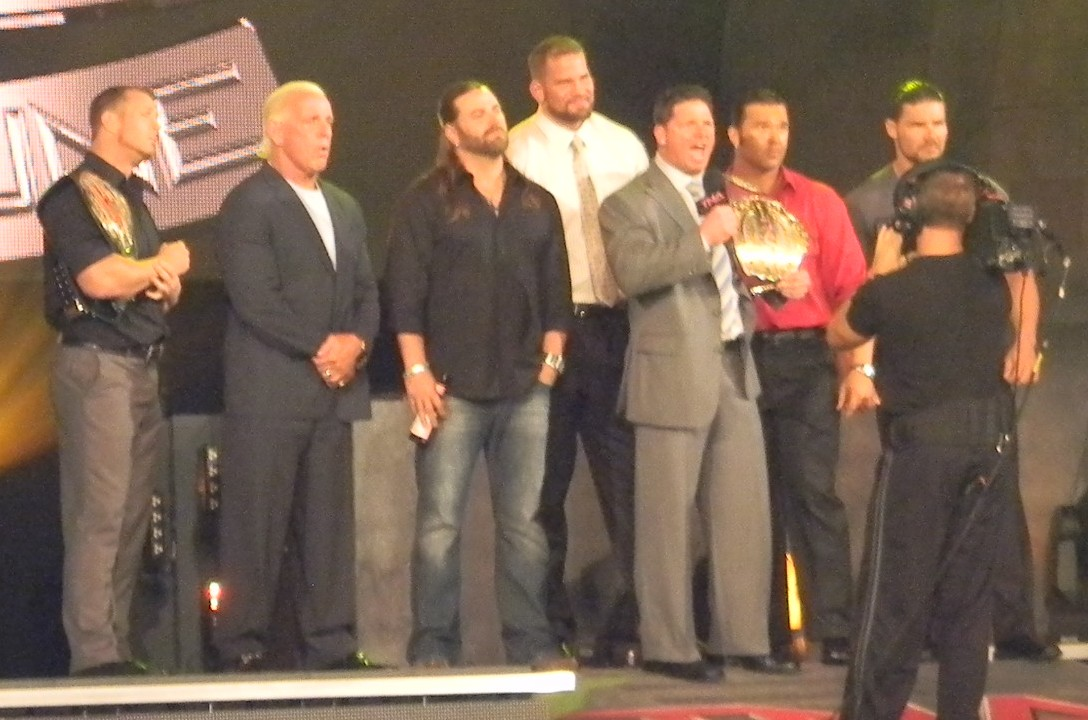
Williams (far left) with Fortune in August 2010

On 3 July 2010, Dixie Carter announced that Durdle had signed a new long–term contract with TNA which also led to him relocating from the United Kingdom to the United States. On 11 July at Victory Road Williams successfully defended his TNA X Division Championship against Brian Kendrick, this time in an Ultimate X submission match. On 5 August episode of Impact! Williams interfered in a Street Fight between Jay Lethal and Ric Flair, helping Flair win the match. The following week Williams joined Flair's Fortune (originally spelled Fourtune) stable, as he, A.J. Styles, Kazarian, Robert Roode, James Storm and Matt Morgan attacked EV 2.0, a stable consisting of former Extreme Championship Wrestling performers. At No Surrender Williams defeated EV 2.0 member Sabu to retain the X Division Championship. On 6 September, at the tapings of 16 September episode of Impact!, Williams lost the X Division Championship to Jay Lethal. Williams received his rematch for the title at Bound for Glory. After failing to finish Lethal with his pure wrestling, Williams resorted to going for a high flying manoeuvre, a Frankensteiner, which ended up backfiring as Lethal countered it into a sunset flip for the victory. On the following episode of Impact! Fortune formed an alliance with Hulk Hogan's and Eric Bischoff's new stable, Immortal.

On 28 October episode of Impact! tensions rose between Williams and the rest of Fortune, in particular his former X Division rival Kazarian, who thought he had a bad attitude. Williams then replaced Kazarian in a tag team match, where he and A.J. Styles defeated EV 2.0 members Rob Van Dam and Raven, after Styles blind tagged Williams and stole his pinfall. Williams then began showing signs of a possible face turn by standing up for Matt Morgan, who was kicked out of Fortune for showing concern for Mr. Anderson, while also voicing his own concern for not being able to spotlight his talent, while a member of Fortune. The following week Flair ordered Williams and Kazarian to settle their differences in the ring. Kazarian won the match between the members of Fortune, after a miscommunication between Williams and James Storm. After the match Flair made Williams and Kazarian shake hands. At Turning Point the seemingly re–united Fortune defeated EV 2.0 in a ten-man tag team match and, as a result, EV 2.0's Sabu was released from TNA. On 11 November episode of Impact! Williams, Roode and Storm faced former Fortune member Matt Morgan in a three–on–one handicap match. During the match Roode and Storm abandoned Williams and left him to be pinned by Morgan. The following week Fortune interfered in a match between Morgan and Ric Flair, however, Williams refused to take part in beating Morgan down. When confronted by Styles, Williams turned face for the first time in his TNA career by attacking the rest of Fortune, helping Morgan clear the ring and costing Flair the match. On 5 December at Final Resolution Williams defeated Styles to win the TNA Television Championship for the first time. On 23 December episode of Impact! Williams defended the Television Championship against Styles in a 20-minute Iron Man match. The match ended in a 1–1 draw, setting up another match at Genesis on 9 January 2011, where Styles would put his spot in Fortune on the line against Williams' title. However, Styles was forced to pull out of the match after suffering a legitimate hip injury and was replaced by his ally Abyss, who proceeded to defeat Williams for the Television Championship, after Styles ran in and hit Williams with the title belt.

==== British Invasion reunion and singles competition (2011–2012) ====
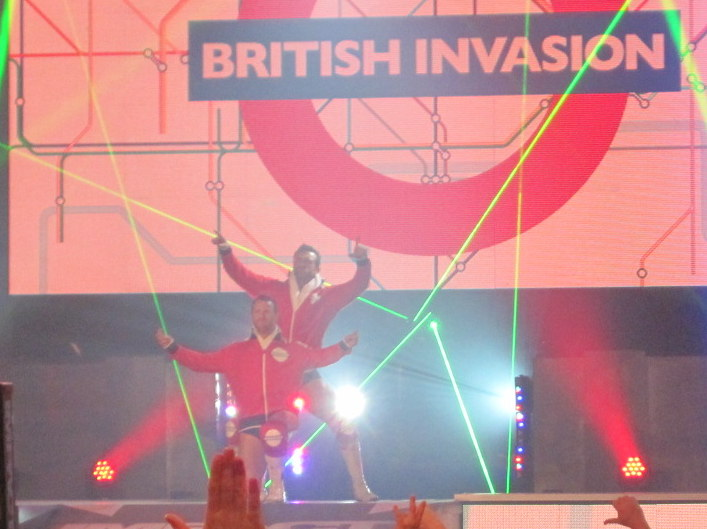
The British Invasion making their entrance at Slammiversary IX

On 31 March episode of Impact!, Williams turned heel and reformed the British Invasion with Magnus by attacking the team of Eric Young and Orlando Jordan. In their first match back together, Williams and Magnus were defeated by Ink Inc. (Jesse Neal and Shannon Moore) on 12 April episode of Xplosion. On 17 April at Lockdown, Williams and Magnus were defeated again by Ink Inc. in a four tag team number one contenders' Steel Cage match. Despite not having won a single match since their reformation, it was announced on 2 June episode of Impact Wrestling that the British Invasion would receive a shot at the TNA World Tag Team Championship at Slammiversary IX. At the pay-per-view, Williams and Magnus were unsuccessful in their challenge for the title, losing to the team of James Storm and Alex Shelley, who filled in for Robert Roode, who was sidelined with a storyline injury. On 30 June episode of Impact Wrestling, Williams and Magnus turned face by responding to Mexican America's bad remarks by praising the United States. They were then attacked until Rob Terry returned to save them, effectively adding him back to the group. On 14 July episode of Impact Wrestling, Mexican America's Anarquia and Hernandez defeated Williams and Magnus in a TNA World Tag Team Championship number one contender's match, following outside interference from their stablemate Rosita. In December, Magnus formed a new tag team with Samoa Joe, which eventually led to the dissolution of the British Invasion.

On 29 December episode of Impact Wrestling, Williams was sidelined with a storyline injury, after Gunner dropped him onto the concrete floor with a DDT. Williams returned to Impact Wrestling on 9 February 2012, episode, taped in London, losing to Alex Shelley in a three-way match, which also included TNA X Division Champion Austin Aries. On 8 July at Destination X, Williams entered a tournament to determine the new X Division Champion, but was defeated in his first round match by Kenny King.

==== Ohio Valley Wrestling (2012–2013) ====
During the summer of 2012, Williams began working as a trainer in TNA's developmental territory Ohio Valley Wrestling (OVW). In September, Williams also began making appearances for OVW's weekly television program. Despite his new job in OVW, Williams also continued making appearances for TNA, unsuccessfully challenging Zema Ion for the TNA X Division Championship on 4 October episode of Impact Wrestling. On 30 January 2013, Williams defeated Rob Terry to win the OVW Heavyweight Championship for the first time. He held the title until 10 April, when he lost it to Jamin Olivencia. On 5 June 2013, Durdle confirmed that he had been released from his TNA Wrestling contract, which also ended his run with OVW.

==== Return (2014) ====
On 1 February 2014, Williams returned to take part in TNA's Impact Wrestling tapings in London, he lost to Ethan Carter III in a singles match. The following day, Williams also took part in the tapings of the Joker's Wild II pay-per-view, where he and Magnus reunited to defeat Chris Sabin and Gunner in a tag team match.

=== Independent circuit (2014–2018) ===
After leaving TNA Wrestling, Williams began working for various independent promotions, most notably in United Kingdom. On 4 October, Williams faced AJ Styles in a 3 way bout for the IWGP heavyweight championship but failed to win the title. on 8 November, Doug Williams defeated Tiger Ali to win the 4FW heavyweight title. on 29 December, Williams defeated Josh Faulkner in the semi-finals then defeated Zack Sabre Jr. to win the 2014 Worthing Trophy. On 28 October 2015, Williams and Nick Aldis reunited as The British Invasion as part of Global Force Wrestling's GFW UK Invasion tour, defeating Marty Scurll and Rampage Brown. On 20 May 2018, Douglas defeated Joseph Conners, Rampage Brown and Rob Lynch to win the vacant Progress Atlas Championship. He lost the title on 30 September 2018 at the event Hello Wembley. He was scheduled for a match on 21 December 2018 against Yoshinari Ogawa for Pro Wrestling Noah, in what was considered to be his final advertised match.

=== Return and retirement (2019–2023) ===
In 2019, Williams began taking bookings in Japan and Germany before committing to a return. On 15 March 2021, Williams announced his return to professional wrestling with the following statement on his twitter; "The events of the past year has made me reassess my decision to retire as it made me understand that you should use your life to fullest doing what you enjoy. As such I am open to bookings again, email is in my bio...". After a 3-year hiatus from the ring, Williams once again returned to the ring, touring the UK Independent circuit under the moniker of "The Ambassador" with companies such as ICW, PROGRESS, 1PW and Rev Pro.

On 17 June 2021, Williams defeated Lookachu in a tournament final for the All Nations Championship at an event promoted jointly by Solent Wrestling Federation and Kreative Alternative Professional Organised Wrestling.

Williams began to wind down his in-ring career in mid 2023. He challenged Andy Roberts for the Union of European Wrestling Alliances European Heavyweight Championship in Scotland for British Championship Wrestling and Martin Steers for the Irish Junior Heavyweight Championship in Belgium.

Williams indicated he was retiring on 17 June 2023 before confirming it in July by saying: Doug Williams the Pro Wrestler is over. A new story awaits. Farewell for now. Thank you for the appreciation. 30 Years of incredible memories.

On June 17, 2023, The Doug Williams retirement Show took place where Williams lost to Taylor Bryden in a two out of three falls match losing the W3L Heavyweight Championship.

=== National Wrestling Alliance (2021–2022) ===
On 7 December 2021, Williams made his NWA Power debut teaming with Nick Aldis reforming The British Invasion defeating Hawx Aerie (PJ and Luke Hawx). On March 22, Williams and Harry Smith were defeated by The Briscoe Brothers in the finals of the Crockett Cup. On June 11, Williams and Smith, now called the Commonwealth Connection defeated La Rebelión Amarilla to become the NWA World Tag Team Champions. The duo defended the titles against the Dirty Sexy Boys (JTG & Dirty Dango) before having to vacate the titles after 77 days.

== Championships and accomplishments ==
=== Martial arts ===
- Judo
  - British Judo Championship (72 kg weight class; 1992)

=== Professional wrestling ===
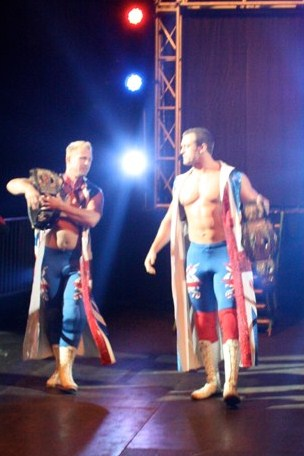
Williams (left) and Brutus Magnus - The British Invasion - as the TNA World Tag Team Champions

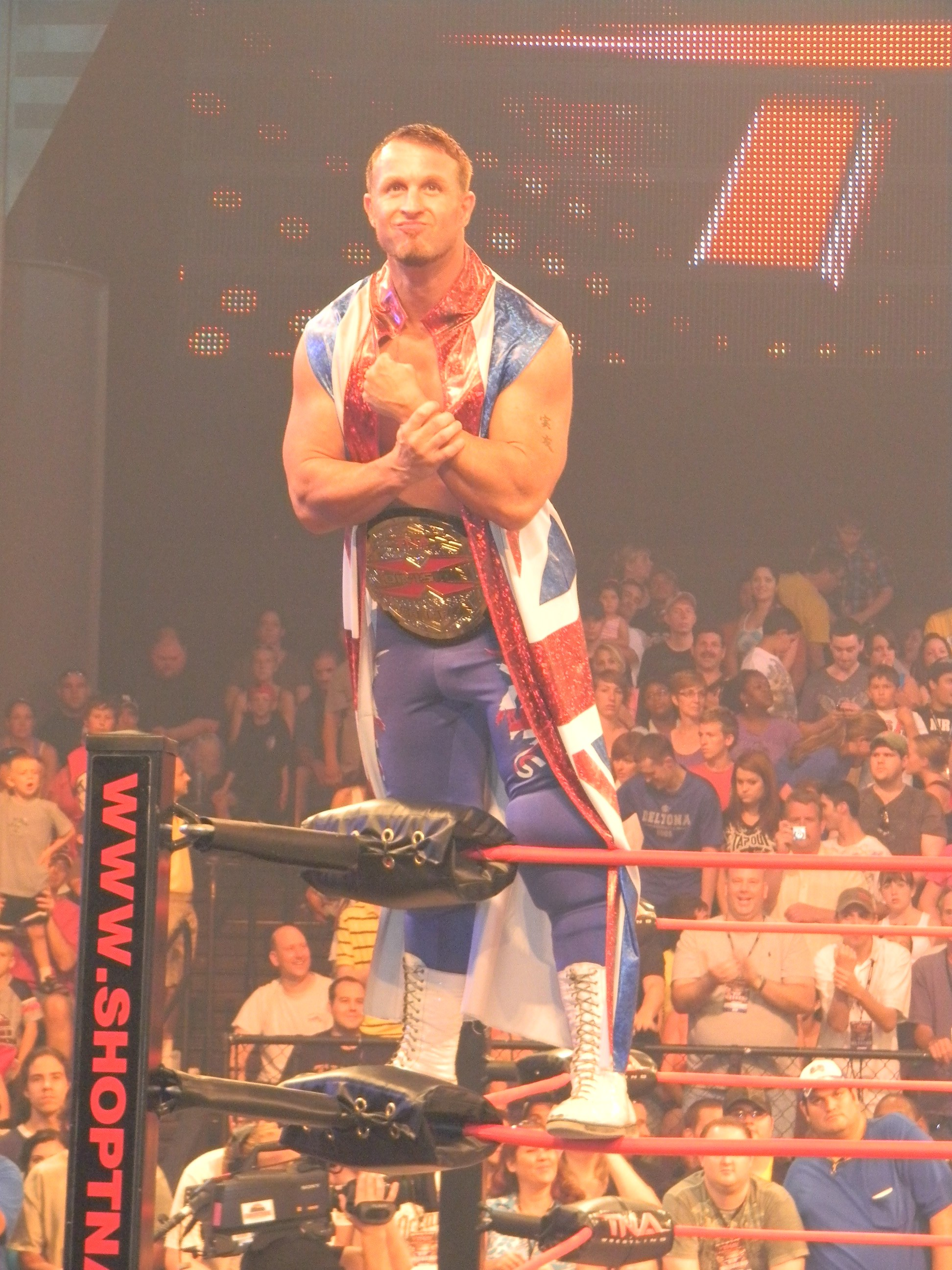
Williams is also a two-time TNA X Division Champion...

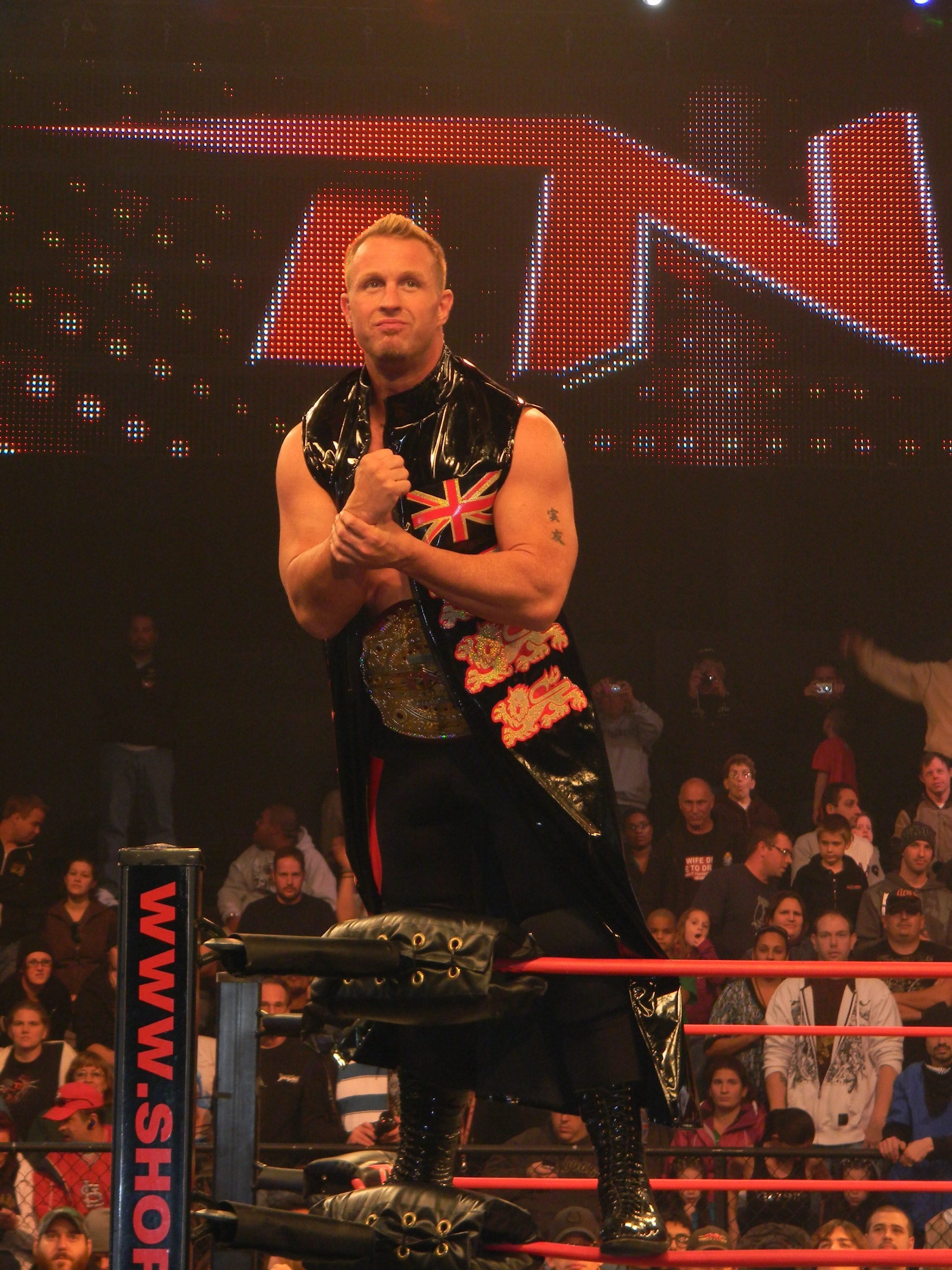
...and a former TNA Television Champion

- 3 Count Wrestling
  - 3CW Heavyweight Championship (1 time)
- 4 Front Wrestling
  - 4FW Heavyweight Championship (1 time)
  - 4FW Inter-Trophy Championship (1 time)
- All Star Wrestling
  - ASW British Heavyweight Championship (1 time)
  - ASW Middle Heavyweight Championship (1 time)
  - ASW People's Championship (1 time)
- Athletik Club Wrestling
  - ACW German Championship (1 time)
  - ACW World Wrestling Championship (1 time)
- Dynamic Over-The-Top Action Wrestling
  - DOA UK Heavyweight Championship (1 time)
- Dropkixx Wrestling
  - Hall of Fame (2006)
- European Wrestling Association
  - EWA Intercontinental Championship (1 time)
- European Wrestling Promotion
  - EWP Intercontinental Championship (1 time)
  - EWP Submission Shootfight Championship (1 time)
- Frontier Wrestling Alliance
  - FWA British Heavyweight Championship (2 times)
  - FWA British Heavyweight Championship Tournament (2001)
- German Stampede Wrestling
  - GSW Tag Team Championship (1 times) - with Martin Stone
- German Wrestling Promotion
  - GWP WrestlingCorner Championship (2 times)
- Full Force Wrestling
  - FFW Finest 4 Trophy (1 time)
- Hammerlock Wrestling
  - Hammerlock Allcomers Championship (1 time)
  - Hammerlock Allcomers Championship Tournament (1995)
  - One Night Tournament (1997)
- International Catch Wrestling Alliance
  - ICWA World Heavyweight Championship (1 time)
- K-Star Promotions
  - One Night Tournament (1998)
- Maximum Wrestling
  - Maximum Championship (1 time)
  - Maximum Rumble (2016)
- NWA UK Hammerlock
  - King of the Ring (1998)
  - Survivor Series Tournament (1996, 1997)
- National Wrestling Alliance
  - NWA World Tag Team Championship (1 time) – with Harry Smith
- New Japan Pro-Wrestling
  - IWGP Tag Team Championship (1 time) – with Brutus Magnus
- Ohio Valley Wrestling
  - OVW Heavyweight Championship (1 time)
- Power of Wrestling
  - POW Intercontinental Championship (1 time)
  - POW Tag Team Championship (2 times) - with Dave Mastiff (1 time), Michael Kovac (1 time)
- Premier Wrestling Federation
  - PWF Heavyweight Championship (1 time)
  - PWF International Championship (1 time)
  - PWF Mid-Heavyweight Championship (1 time)
  - Worthing Trophy (2002, 2003, 2004, 2006, 2014, 2017)
  - Wrestler of the Year (2002–2004, 2006, 2007)
- Preston City Wrestling
  - PCW Heavyweight Championship (1 time)
- Pro Wrestling Illustrated
  - Ranked No. 45 of the top 500 singles wrestlers in the PWI 500 in 2010
- Pro Wrestling Noah
  - GHC Tag Team Championship (1 time) – with Scorpio
- Pro Wrestling Pride
  - PWP Catch Division Championship (1 time)
- Progress Wrestling
  - Progress Atlas Championship (1 time)
- Revolution British Wrestling
  - One Night Tournament (2005)
- Ring of Honor
  - ROH Pure Championship (1 time)
  - ROH Pure Championship Tournament (2004)
- Rings of Europe
  - Thermencup (2005)
- Scottish Wrestling Alliance
  - SWA Scottish Heavyweight Championship (1 time)
- Solent Wrestling Federation/Kreative Alternative Professional Organised Wrestling
  - KAPOW All Nations Championship (1 time, inaugural)
  - KAPOW All Nations Title Tournament (2021)
- Total Nonstop Action Wrestling
  - TNA Television Championship (1 time)
  - TNA X Division Championship (2 times)
  - TNA World Tag Team Championship (1 time) – with Brutus Magnus
  - Feast or Fired (2009 – X Division Championship contract)
- The Wrestling Alliance
  - Universal British Heavyweight Championship (1 time)
  - TWA British Heavyweight Championship (2 times)
  - TWA European Heavyweight Championship (1 time)
  - TWA British Tag Team Championship (1 time) – with Robbie Brookside
  - TWA British Heavyweight Championship Tournament (2001)
  - British Heavyweight Championship Tournament (2002)
- TopCatch
  - TopCatch Europameisterschaft Championship (1 time)
- Triple X Wrestling
  - TXW Crush Championship (1 time)
- Ultimate Wrestling Alliance
  - UWA Heavyweight Championship (1 time)
- Westside Xtreme Wrestling
  - wXw Tag Team Championship (1 time) – with Martin Stone
  - Trios Tournament (2006) – with Takashi Sugiura and Yoshinobu Kanemaru
  - wXw Hall of Fame (Class of 2018)
- World Association of Wrestling
  - WAW European Heavyweight Championship (1 time)
- World Wide Wrestling League
  - W3L Heavyweight Championship (1 time)
- WrestleZone
  - Battle of the Nations (2015)
