= Paul Burchill =

English professional wrestler (born 1979)

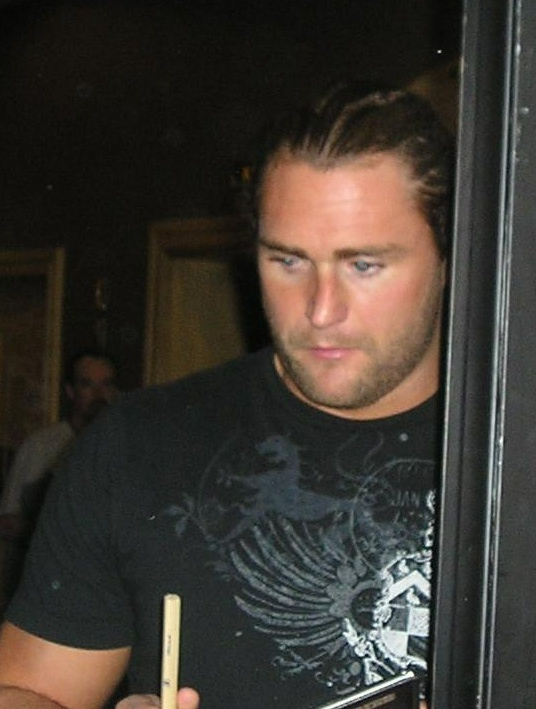
- Burchill at a signing in Belfast, Northern Ireland, 2009.

Personal information
- Born: Paul Birchall; 8 October 1979 (age 46) Guildford, England
- Spouse: Pat Sanchez (m. 1998)
- Children: 4

Professional wrestling career
- Ring name(s): Paul Burchill; Burchill; The Ripper
- Billed height: 6 ft 4 in (193 cm)
- Billed weight: 247 lb (112 kg)
- Billed from: Chelsea, England; London, England; Guildford, Surrey; Saint Thomas, US Virgin Islands
- Trained by: Frontier Wrestling Alliance; Mark Sloan
- Debut: 2002

Paul Birchall (born 8 October 1979), better known by his ring name Paul Burchill, is an English professional wrestler, making appearances for the National Wrestling Alliance under the ring name Burchill (shortened from his previous ring name Paul Burchill). He is best known for his time with WWE. Prior to joining WWE, Burchill wrestled for the Frontier Wrestling Alliance and other promotions in Europe.

After signing with WWE, Burchill competed in their former developmental territory, Ohio Valley Wrestling, where he won the OVW Heavyweight Championship four times and the OVW Tag Team Championship one time. He was called up to the main roster in August 2005, forming a tag team with William Regal. After they split up the following year, Burchill was repackaged with a pirate gimmick and was aligned with Katie Lea, competing sporadically on the Heat, Raw, and ECW brands until his release from the company in 2010. He later made appearances for several promotions on the independent circuit until retiring in 2017.

== Professional wrestling career ==
=== Frontier Wrestling Alliance (2002–2004) ===
Birchall is a former primary school teacher from Surrey, but got into professional wrestling in 2001 after walking into the Frontier Wrestling Alliance's (FWA) Academy and quickly impressing the man running the camp, Mark Sloan.

While training at the Academy under Sloan's guidance, Birchall made his debut in August 2002 using the slightly modified spelling of his name Paul Burchill. In mid-2002, Burchill began to appear in the FWA by interfering in matches or before them, making unscheduled appearances and beating other wrestlers leading to October at Uprising when he took out both members of The New Breed (Ashe and Curve) singlehandedly before their match. He went on interfering in matches, even taking out all four competitors in a four-way match until May when he made his first scheduled appearance at Frontiers of Honour, jointly held between FWA and Ring of Honor (ROH). Debuting with manager 'Twisted Genius' Dean Ayass he defeated the tag team of Double Dragon (Raj Jordon and Ross Jordan), in his first sanctioned match by double knockout. Burchill went on an undefeated streak in handicap matches against tag teams for the rest of the year, often running into the Duke of Danger (who he'd taken out in the four-way) and Andy Simmons, part of the aristocrat themed group Hampton Court. He cemented this winning streak in a moment voted thirteenth on the FWA's Top 20 Moments when he interrupted the Duke's thrashing of peasants (squashing jobbers) at Hotwired in September and performed a double rolling fireman's carry slam before debuting his C-4 finishing move. By the end of 2003 he was voted Rookie of the Year by both Total Wrestling and 1 Stop Wrestling.

His winning streak would go untarnished until mid-2004 at June's Carpe Diem event where Simmons continued to resist being pinned or submitting to Burchill. Frustrated, Burchill went up the ramp to talk to his manager Ayass but while there veteran Drew McDonald came from the back and hit him with a steel chair causing Burchill to lose via count out. Burchill gained some level of revenge when he teamed up with Terry Funk and Paul Travell to take on McDonald, Thunder and his first victim Ghosh at November's British Uprising III, receiving a standing ovation from the 1,800 fans in attendance as news broke that he had signed with American promotion World Wrestling Entertainment (WWE). A fortnight later at FWA's annual Gold Rush event he faced FWA British Heavyweight Champion Alex Shane in a non-title match, being pinned for the first time since training in the Academy in his last match.

=== Other promotions (2004) ===
On 1 August 2004, Burchill defeated Doug Williams and The Zebra Kid (Roy Bevis) in a No Holds Barred three-way match to become the International Wrestling Promotions (IWP) Heavyweight Champion. He would hold the title until 6 November, when he lost a Falls Count Anywhere match to D'Lo Brown.

In May 2004, Burchill made two appearances in Athletik Club Wrestling (ACW) in Germany losing in a tag team match to Jerry Lynn and Michael Kovac. Later that night he took part in a 22-man battle royal losing to fellow Brit Doug Williams. He returned in July for Summer Heat where he took on Patrick Shulz, who he had tagged with at the previous event, and won in a grudge match. Shulz, with his Made in Germany tag team partner Eric Shwarz, gained a return victory later that night over Burchill and Crazy Sexy Mike.

=== World Wrestling Entertainment (2005–2010) ===
==== Ohio Valley Wrestling (2005–2008) ====
Burchill briefly appeared in Ohio Valley Wrestling (OVW) in 2005 before his appearance on SmackDown, making it to the second round of a tournament for the OVW Television Championship. He also feuded briefly with Nick Nemeth, exchanging victories before winning an OVW Southern Tag Team Championship shot along with Seth Skyfire in a battle royal but the hastily assembled pair could not defeat The Blond Bombers (Tank and Chad Toland) in the next match.

In January 2006 he began a feud with Ken Doane after Doane abandoned Burchill during a tag team match. The following week Burchill defeated Doane despite the presence of the rest of The Spirit Squad at ringside. He also had a brief angle where he interrupted a match to attack Shelly Martinez but instead carried her backstage and she was later seen wearing a pirate's wench outfit and chasing him to no avail. She would later attack Cherry Pie during his win over Deuce Shade. In September he won a battle royal for a shot at the OVW Heavyweight Championship but lost the match later that night. He earned another shot at the championship in December by defeating Seth Skyfire in a Christmas Presents match. A week later Chett the Jet beat Jacob Duncan for the championship at which point Burchill came to the ring and hit Chett with a steel chair, telling Danny Basham, the Troubleshooter, that he was the primary contender for the belt and demanded a match instantly thus ending 2006 with his first OVW Heavyweight Championship.

He defended the belt frequently against both Chett and Duncan in 2007 and earned the nickname "Ripper" by repeatedly defeating them both but lost it on 17 February in his second defence against Cody Runnels. He won it back the next day from Rhodes. After more successful defences Aaron "The Idol" Stevens won the belt from him on 14 March. A rematch on 18 April ended in a double count-out but Burchill would not be appeased, interfering in Runnels' title shot to make the match a no contest and on 9 May he was given another shot at the title and won it for a third time. Two weeks later on 23 May, a rematch between Burchill and Stevens went to a draw when both men simultaneously pinned each other leading the title to be held up and vacated. A match for the vacant title was booked between Burchill, Stevens and Jay Bradley on 1 June with Bradley picking up the win. Burchill regained the belt later that month on 27 June but lost it 28 July to Vladimir Kozlov.

In August, Burchill pinned Mark Henry in retaliation for Henry injuring him on SmackDown months prior. In November he defeated Stu Sanders by the referee's ten count but teamed with him the following week, eventually getting to the finals of a tournament for the OVW Southern Tag Team Championship but losing the last match to Shawn Spears and Colt Cabana. In the first show of 2008 the team beat Cabana and Charles Evans to capture the titles. Around the same time he also began sending presents to Katie "The Kat" Lea as a secret admirer, eventually revealing himself when he helped her win her second OVW Women's Championship. His final appearance in OVW, on 27 February, was in a four corners tag team match where he and Sanders lost their championship to Los Locos (Ramón and Raúl).

==== Teaming and feuding with William Regal (2005–2007) ====
After arriving in the US, Burchill was scouted by Tommy Dreamer and called up to the main roster by August. He made his WWE debut on 27 August 2005 episode of Velocity, when he made a run-in in a match between fellow Englishman William Regal and Scotty 2 Hotty. Burchill quickly established an alliance with his countryman, helping Regal to beat down Scotty 2 Hotty. A week later he debuted on SmackDown!, teaming with Regal to defeat Hotty and Funaki via submission when Scotty tapped out to Burchill's Royal Mutilation. The next week on SmackDown!, Burchill defeated Scotty 2 Hotty in a singles match in the same manner. After rising through the tag team ranks Regal and Burchill were given a chance at the Tag Team Championship in a Fatal Four Way match facing The Mexicools, MNM and then-champions Legion of Doom (Road Warrior Animal and Heidenreich), but lost out to MNM. Regal and Burchill continued tagging together, mainly feuding with The Mexicools on Velocity while Regal often acted as a manager for Burchill during his singles matches. He lost to Bobby Lashley in mid-December, but bounced back with a win on Velocity, debuting his C-4 move in WWE to defeat John Xavier. In January he appeared in a 20-man battle royal for the World Heavyweight Championship, but was eliminated by the eventual winner Kurt Angle.

On SmackDown! on 3 February 2006, Burchill and Regal told SmackDown! "network representative" Palmer Canon that they no longer wanted to be a tag team so they could go their separate ways. During this discussion, Burchill informed Canon that his family heritage traces back to the pirate Blackbeard and he wanted to do a pirate gimmick on SmackDown!. He followed through on this promise the following week when he appeared backstage dressed as a pirate, with a look similar to that of Johnny Depp's character from the Pirates of the Caribbean film series. Regal tried to convince Burchill to return to his former ruthless gimmick, while Burchill refused cementing him as a fan favourite. Burchill had his first match as a pirate on the edition of SmackDown! on 10 March 2006, making an elaborate entrance by swinging down to the floor on a rope. Burchill defeated Regal using the C-4, which was renamed Walking the Plank to suit the gimmick. After Regal continued to persuade Burchill to return to his former gimmick, the two were booked in a match where the loser would be forced to wear the winner's choice of clothing. Burchill won the match, forcing Regal to dress at his whim until Burchill lost another match, initially dressing him up as a buxom wench, and later in various costumes such as a chicken suit and a gorilla suit. Eventually, he made Regal dress up like a buccaneer to tag with him against Gymini on 21 April. Burchill ended up abandoning Regal during the match, which led to Gymini picking up the victory. In early June, Burchill's popular pirate gimmick came to an end when Mark Henry, who was going on a storyline rampage, defeated Burchill and then assaulted him afterwards resulting in him being stretchered off SmackDown. Afterwards, Burchill returned to Ohio Valley Wrestling.

In 2007, Burchill worked in dark matches for WWE teaming with Dave Taylor on Smackdown until October of that year when he was replaced by Drew McIntyre.

==== Alliance with Katie Lea and departure (2008–2010) ====
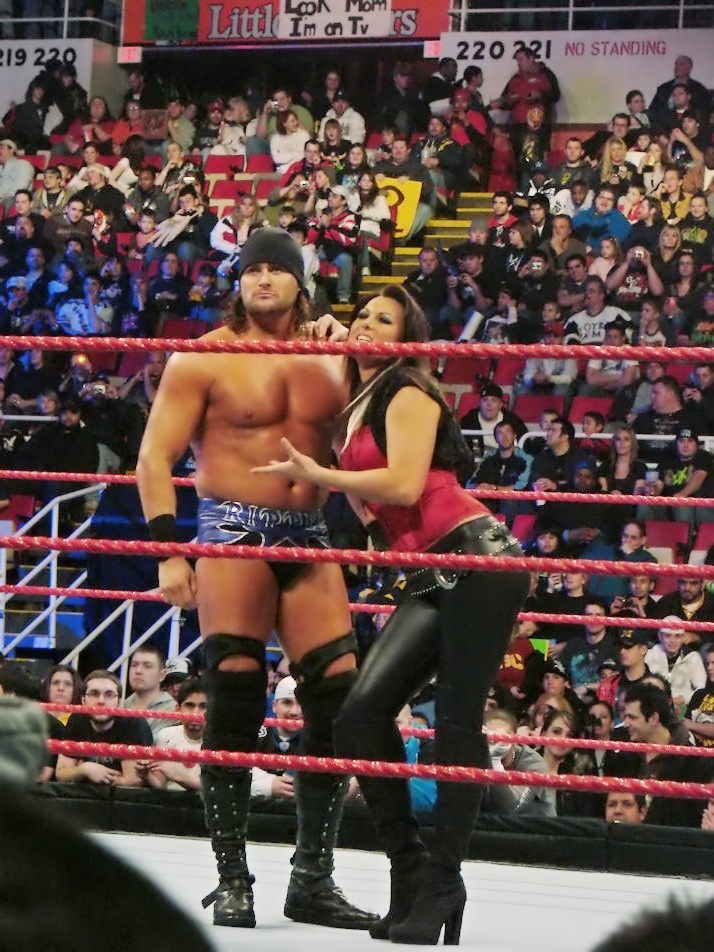
Burchill with his on-screen sister Katie Lea Burchill.

After appearing on Heat on several occasions, Burchill made his return to WWE television as a villain for the first time since June 2006 with fellow FWA alumna Katie Lea playing his on-screen sister during the episode of Raw on 11 February, defeating Brian Kendrick in a singles match. Continuing to appear on Heat, Burchill and Katie would occasionally appear on Raw in handicap matches. On 26 May, Burchill assaulted Mr. Kennedy because he forced William Regal to leave Raw which led to a brief feud until Kennedy was drafted to SmackDown. After this, Burchill engaged in a brief feud with then-Intercontinental Champion Kofi Kingston while Katie Lea feuded with then-Women's Champion Mickie James but despite defeating them in a tag team match, neither won their respective titles in singles matches. Following this Burchill had a minimal on-air role, making brief appearances in squash matches to Batista and Jamie Noble.

Burchill and Katie Lea were later both moved from Raw to the ECW brand on 30 December 2008, where Burchill lost to DJ Gabriel in his debut match for the brand. The Burchills were defeated in a mixed tag team match against Gabriel and Alicia Fox on 13 January 2009. On the edition of 3 February of ECW, Burchill scored his first win as a member of the ECW brand by defeating Tommy Dreamer. The following week on ECW, Burchill defeated The Boogeyman. At Bragging Rights, Burchill challenged Christian for the ECW Championship, but was defeated.

Burchill then became embroiled in a rivalry with backstage interviewer Gregory Helms, who he accused of being masked wrestler The Hurricane (who Helms also portrayed). After several months of matches and attacks, the two finally agreed to settle the matter in a match on 17 November's ECW, which saw Hurricane's mask put up against Burchill's career on the ECW brand, which Burchill lost. Despite the storyline firing, Burchill appeared on 3 December episode of Superstars under a mask during The Hurricane's match with Zack Ryder, and subsequently attacked Hurricane. The following week on ECW, Burchill and Katie Lea, now sporting masks and calling themselves The Ripper and The Beautiful Nightmare respectively, appeared in a backstage segment with general manager Tiffany and asked for a contract, which Tiffany said they would receive if The Ripper could defeat The Hurricane the following week in a match. However, The Ripper was unmasked by Hurricane and subsequently defeated, resulting in Burchill and Katie remaining off ECW. After the closure of the ECW brand, Burchill was formally released by WWE on 26 February 2010.

=== Independent circuit (2010–2018) ===
On 8 May 2010, Burchill lost to AJ Styles in a match for Pro Wrestling Syndicate.

On 22 and 23 April 2011 Paul appeared at Heartland Wrestling Association and took part in "Heartland Cup 2011". He defeated Jesse Emerson in the first round match, but lost to Jake Crist in quarterfinals who later won the tournament.

On 3 November 2012 at a CFW event Burchill faced Matt Hardy in a losing effort. On 5 January 2013 at Crossfire 2nd Anniversary Event, Rough Cut (Burchill and David Young) (w/Jillian Hall) defeated Blink 2-4-7 (Derrick King and Tatt2) and lost to The Hot Shots (Cassidy Riley and Chase Stevens) on the same night. He retired from wrestling in 2013.

On 23 September 2017, Burchill returned to wrestling being was one of eight contenders in a ladder match for the OVW Television Championship, which was won by Reverend Stuart Miles.

=== National Wrestling Alliance (2023–present) ===
Burchill returned from retirement in 2023 wrestling for the NWA on an episode of Powerrr. This marked his first match since 2018.

In August 2024, it was announced that Burchill had signed an exclusive contract with NWA. Since his return to wrestling, Burchill spent most of 2024 in contention for the NWA National Heavyweight Championship. In 2025, Burchill was an entrant in the Jax Dane Memorial Tournament to determine the #1 contender for the NWA World's Heavyweight Championship, defeating Zyon in the first round.

== Personal life ==
Birchall is married to Pat Sanchez and has four sons. His brother, Major Sean Birchall, was killed in Afghanistan on 19 June 2009. Birchall worked as a firefighter and EMT.

== Championships and accomplishments ==
  - One Night Tournament (2004)
- International Wrestling Promotions
  - IWP Heavyweight Championship (1 time)
- Ohio Valley Wrestling
  - OVW Heavyweight Championship (4 times)
  - OVW Southern Tag Team Championship (1 time) – with Stu Sanders
- Pro Wrestling Illustrated
  - PWI ranked him #123 of the top 500 singles wrestlers in the PWI 500 in 2009

• Stache Club Wrestling Championship 1X

=== Luchas de Apuestas record ===
Winner (wager)	Loser (wager)	Location	Event	Date	Notes
The Hurricane (mask)	Paul Burchill (career)	Philadelphia, Pennsylvania	ECW on Syfy	17 November 2009	
