= Danny Burch =

English professional wrestler (born 1981)

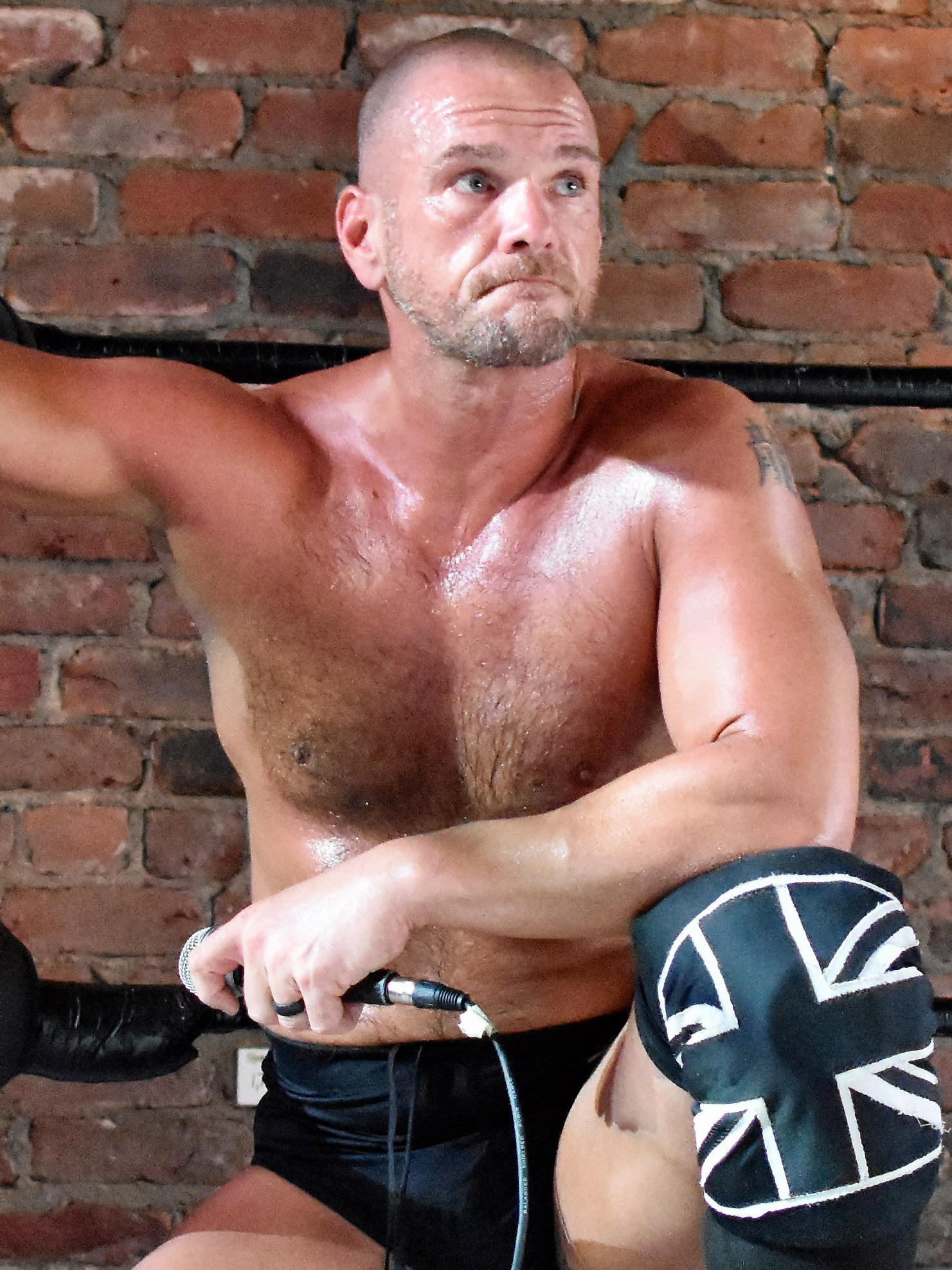
- Burch in April 2018

Personal information
- Born: Martin Harris; 31 December 1981 (age 44) London, England

Professional wrestling career
- Ring name(s): Danny Burch; Joe Riot; Martin Stone; Danny Briggs
- Billed height: 6 ft 0 in (183 cm)
- Billed weight: 190 lb (86 kg)
- Billed from: East London
- Debut: 2003

Martin Harris (born 31 December 1981) is an English professional wrestler. He currently performs for Coastal Championship Wrestling (CCW) under the ring name Martin Stone. He is best known for his time with WWE, where he performed on the NXT brand under the ring name Danny Burch. He is a former one time NXT Tag Team Champion with Oney Lorcan.

== Early life ==
Martin Harris was born on 31 December 1981 in London, England.

== Professional wrestling career ==
=== European independent circuit (2003–2011) ===
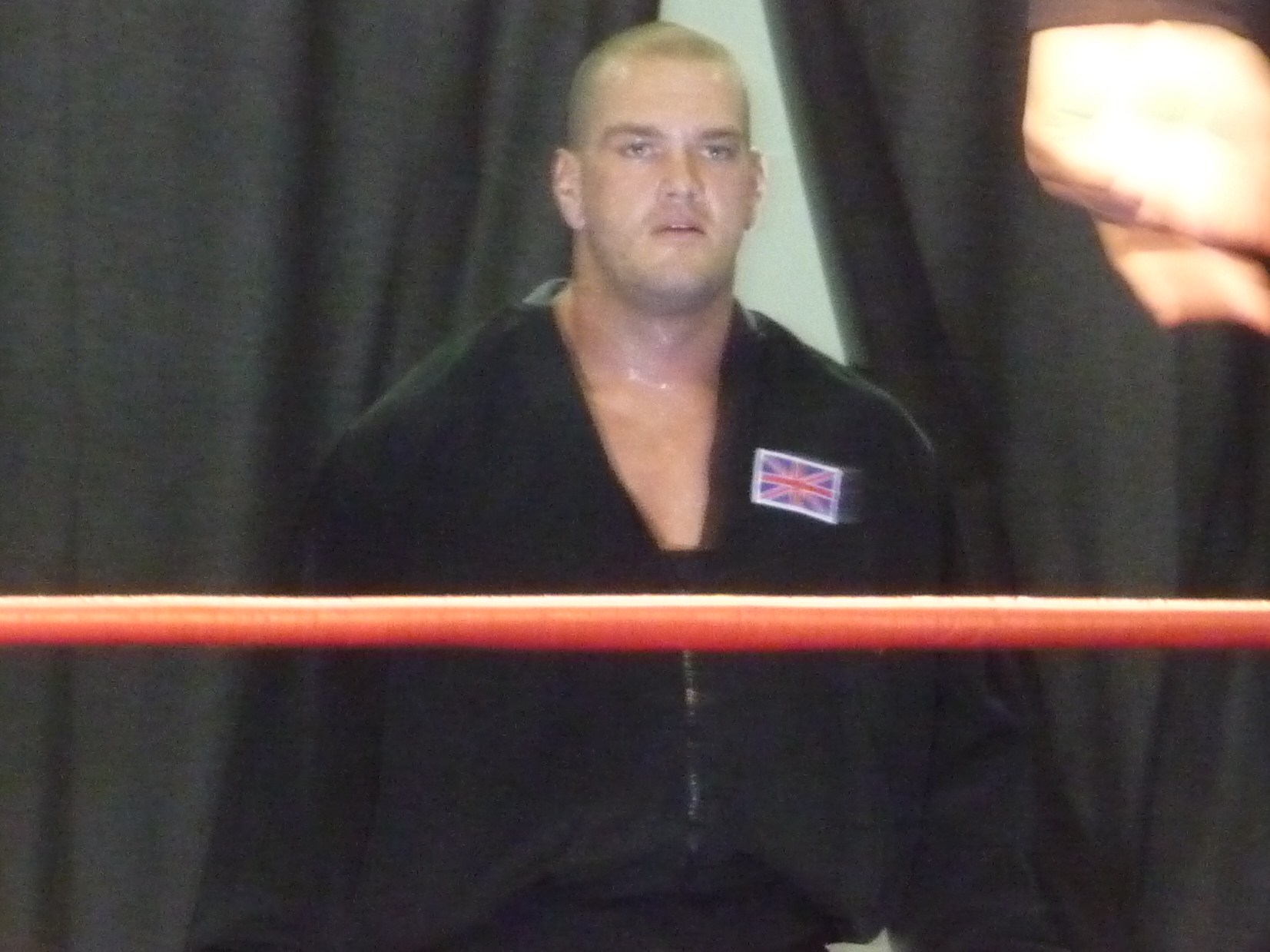
Stone in May 2010

Harris trained in the FWA Academy in 2003–04; competing under the ring name Joe Riot in various shows, including a match for All Star Wrestling in Croydon in Summer 2003; making his first appearance at FWA:A's Revenge – Chapter IV in losing effort to Leroy Kincaide on 29 November 2003 in Portsmouth. Harris made his first main roster appearance under the name "Martin Stone" on 4 September 2004, in a losing effort to Jack Xavier at a Live in Morecambe show. Stone would soon be paired with FWA:A trainee Stixx and manager "Twisted Genius" Dean Ayass to form the tag team Stixx and Stone.

While still in the FWA, Stone travelled all over the United Kingdom, competing in several other promotions including: International Pro Wrestling: United Kingdom, One Pro Wrestling, LDN Wrestling, and Real Quality Wrestling. Stone won several top titles in these promotions the most notable of which would be his 15-month title reign as IPW:UK Champion.

Back in the FWA, Stixx and Stone would quickly capture the FWA Tag Team Championships from the team of Hampton Court (Duke of Danger and Simmons) on 18 June 2005 at FWA NOAH Limits. Stone would be stripped of the title 16 months later after being unable to make a mandatory title defence on 19 November 2006 due to commitments with IPW:UK.

The tag title strip happened at the height of FWA's "Civil War" with IPW:UK, which would quickly see then-IPW:UK champion Stone officially leave FWA to stay on the side of IPW:UK. Stone would lead the war against the FWA and is in preparation to face semi-retired FWA star Alex Shane in a Promotion v Promotion – Winner Takes All Match at Broxbourne on 16 March 2007. This match however ended up taking place in Orpington several weeks later, with Flash Barker replacing an injured Alex Shane.

In late April 2007, Stone represented Real Quality Wrestling in the prestigious King of Europe Cup where he was defeated by Go Shiozaki in the first round.

During this time Stone would compete in and win an RQW tournament at Not Just For Christmas to become RQW's Heavyweight Champion. Stone defeated Iceman and Aviv Maayan in the first two rounds before defeating Pac in the final to win the vacant championship.

In September 2007, Stone began to compete regularly for the German promotion Westside Xtreme Wrestling. On 26 July 2008, Stone won the wXw Tag Team Championship alongside Doug Williams when the pair beat AbLas (Absolute Andy and Steve Douglas) at wXw Broken Rulz VIII in Oberhausen.

In February 2008, Stone competed Chikara's King of Trios tournament in Philadelphia, United States, teaming with The Kartel as Team IPW:UK, but were defeated in the second round of the tournament by the Golden Trio (Delirious, Hallowicked and Helios). On 28 August 2008, Stone defeated Eamon O'Neill and James Tighe to win the Premier Promotions Worthing Trophy.

On 13 February 2010 at the British Uproar event in Broxbourne, Martin Stone defeated Andy Simmonz in the tournament finals to become the first FWA World Heavyweight Champion. In a speech after the match he turned against the fans and claimed that he was only using British wrestling as a stepping stone to a big-money contract in the US. A month later he became the leader of "The Agenda", a faction of FWA wrestlers with aims along the same lines.

On 14 March 2010 at PW101 Unstoppable at The Hubs in Sheffield. Martin Stone defeated 11 other men in the 101 Championship Rush match last defeating Martin Kirby to become Pro Wrestling 101's first and only Heavyweight Champion. Upon returning to Britain in 2014, Stone challenged for Jack Jester's ICW Heavyweight Championship but was defeated.

=== WWE (2011–2014) ===
In late 2011, Harris signed with WWE and reported to its developmental territory in June 2012. He was given the ring name Danny Burch, and he made his televised debut for NXT Wrestling on 15 May 2013, episode of NXT with a loss to Bray Wyatt. From then on, Burch was used sporadically as enhancement talent until it was reported on 30 April 2014 that he was released by WWE.

=== Total Nonstop Action Wrestling (2014–2015) ===
In 2014 Harris, under his Martin Stone name, appeared on the second season of TNA British Boot Camp. On 16 February 2015 Harris competed at the TNA One Night Only: Gut Check, where he defeated Jessie Godderz to qualify for the final match later that night. He then competed in a five-way elimination match where the winner of that match would earn an appearance on the next episode of Impact Wrestling, though he was unsuccessful as the match was won by Tevita Fifita.

=== Return to WWE ===
==== Sporadic appearances (2015–2017) ====
On 16 July 2015, though not re-signed to WWE, Stone made an appearance on an NXT television taping, where he lost to Kevin Owens. He made a second appearance on the 13 August 2015 taping of NXT, where he lost to Apollo Crews. He made a third appearance on 16 September, where he was referred to as his old NXT name Danny Burch, losing to Tye Dillinger. He made a fourth appearance on the 21 October 2015 taping of NXT, where he lost to James Storm. Burch made a further appearance on NXT on 13 January 2016 in a losing effort against Tommaso Ciampa. He again faced Ciampa and Johnny Gargano, teaming up with Rob Ryzin on the 18 May taping of NXT, losing again. On 14 September 2016, during the Cruiserweight Classic Finale he teamed up with Sean Maluta and lost to The Bollywood Boyz, Gurv Sihra and Harv Sihra, in a dark match. On 6 January 2017 it was announced by WWE that Burch will be a participant in the 16 man WWE United Kingdom Championship Tournament. Burch was eliminated in the first round by Jordan Devlin. On the 19 April episode of NXT, Burch appeared in a losing effort to Andrade "Cien" Almas. He would then appear in NXT as part of the UK division this time losing to the WWE United Kingdom Champion Pete Dunne.

==== Teaming with Oney Lorcan (2017–2022) ====
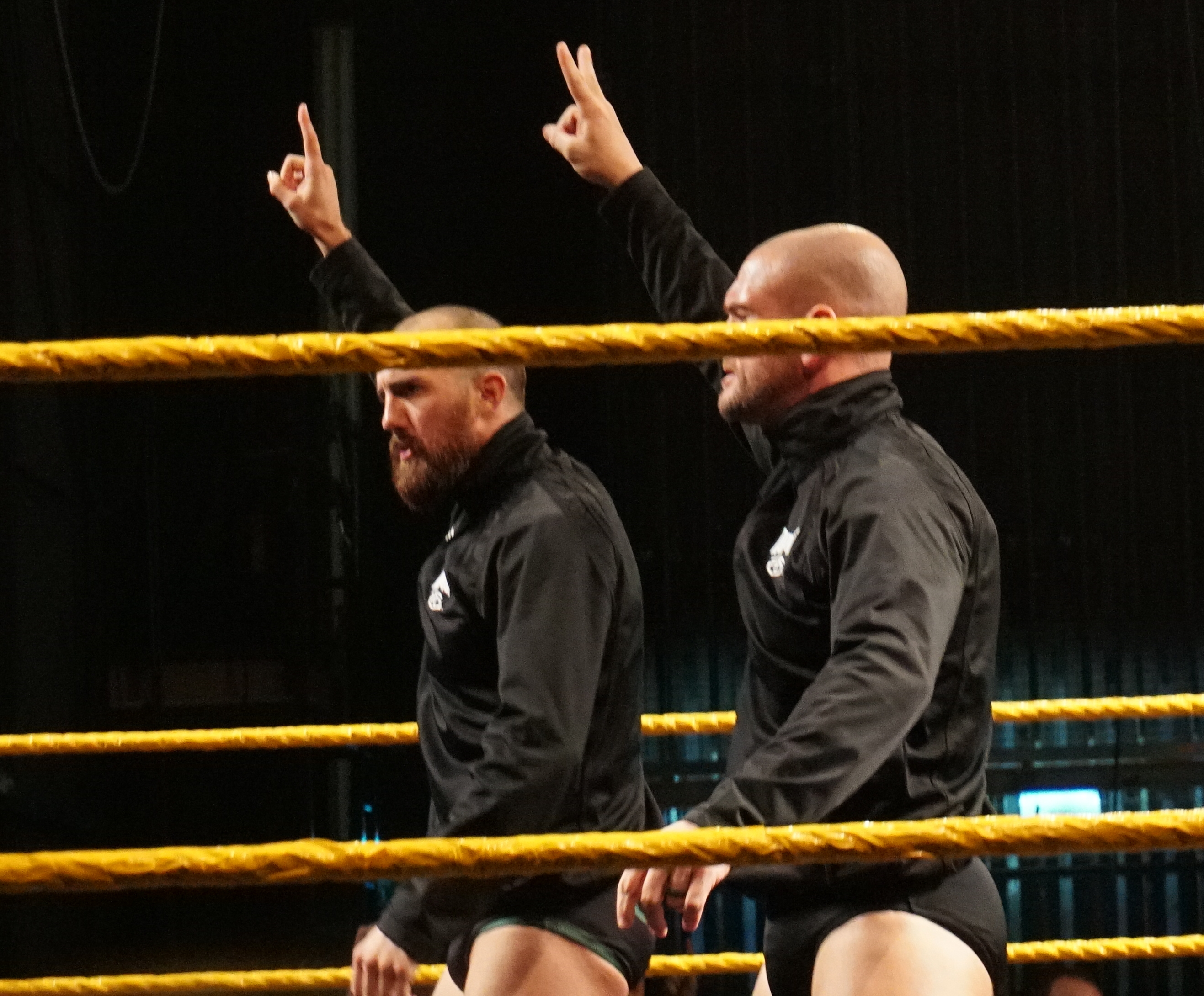
Burch (right) and Oney Lorcan performing their signature pose in June 2018

From August, Burch would begin a feud with Oney Lorcan, after the two traded victories, they would go on to form a tag team and would feud with Riddick Moss and Tino Sabbatelli. In early 2018 they would take part in the Dusty Rhodes Tag Team Classic, but were eliminated in the first round. On 29 April 2018, Burch signed a full-time contract with WWE again. Burch and Lorcan would go on to face The Undisputed Era (Kyle O'Reilly and Roderick Strong) at NXT Takeover: Chicago in a losing effort.

On 24 September 2019 Burch made his 205 Live debut when he and his tag team partner, Oney Lorcan defeated the WWE Cruiserweight Champion Drew Gulak and Tony Nese.

On 30 January 2020 Burch returned to NXT UK to team up with Oney Lorcan in a tag team match defeating The Hunt (Primate and Wild Boar). They then teamed up again on the 13 February episode of NXT UK in a non-title match against the NXT UK Tag Team Champions Gallus (Mark Coffey and Wolfgang) but failed to beat them. On the May 20 episode of NXT, Lorcan and Burch defeated Ever-Rise and proceeded to call out the NXT Tag Team Champions Imperium (Marcel Barthel and Fabian Aichner) afterwards by mocking their signature pose. The following week, they challenged them for the NXT Tag Team Titles but were defeated by Breezango (Tyler Breeze and Fandango) in a No #1 Contender's match.

On 21 October episode of NXT, after Undisputed Era members Bobby Fish and Roderick Strong were taken out, Lorcan and Burch replaced them in an NXT Tag Team Championship match. They won the titles by defeating Breezango (Tyler Breeze and Fandango) with help from Pat McAfee, turning heel in the process. On 23 March 2021, William Regal vacated the NXT Tag Team Championship after Burch suffered a shoulder injury. On the 7 September edition of NXT, Burch and Lorcan challenged MSK for the titles but were defeated. After the match both Holland and Dunne attacked Lorcan & Burch thus ending their alliance. On 4 November Lorcan was released from his WWE contract, disbanding their team. On 5 January 2022 Burch was released from his WWE contract.

=== Return to the independent circuit (2023–present) ===
On 13 January 2023 Stone returned to the ring following his release from WWE. In his first match back, he competed for Coastal Championship Wrestling in Kissimmee, Florida.

=== All Elite Wrestling (2024) ===
On 27 April 2024, under his Martin Stone name, debuted for All Elite Wrestling during an episode of AEW Collision, losing to Rush.

== Championships and accomplishments ==
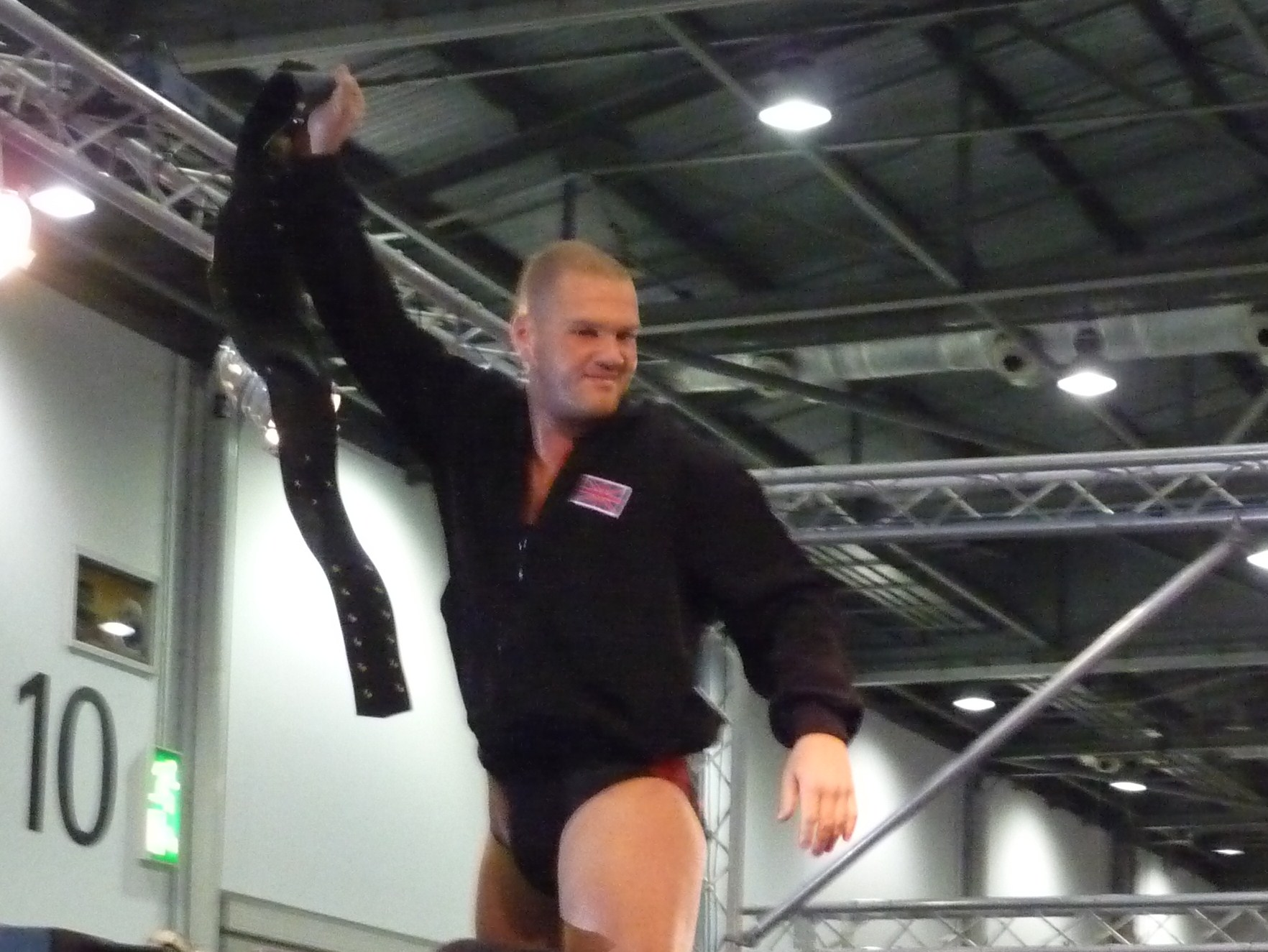
Martin Stone with the FWA World Heavyweight Championship in May 2010

- 4 Front Wrestling
  - 4FW Heavyweight Championship (1 time)
- Atlanta Wrestling Entertainment
  - GWC Championship (1 time)
- Best of British Wrestling
  - BOBW Heavyweight Championship (1 time)
- Coastal Championship Wrestling
  - CCW Tag Team championship (1 time) – with Stallion Rogers
- Frontier Wrestling Alliance
  - FWA World Heavyweight Championship (1 time)
  - FWA Tag Team Championship (1 time) – with Stixx
- Full Impact Pro
  - FIP Florida Heritage Championship (1 time)
- German Stampede Wrestling
  - GSW Tag Team Championship (2 time) – with Matt Vaughn (1) and Doug Williams (1)
- International Pro Wrestling: United Kingdom
  - IPW:UK Championship (3 times)
- LDN Wrestling
  - LDN Championship (2 times)
- NWA Florida Underground Wrestling
  - NWA FUW Flash Championship (1 time)
- One Pro Wrestling
  - 1PW World Heavyweight Championship (1 time)
  - 1PW Openweight Championship (1 time)
- Platinum Pro Wrestling
  - PPW Platinumweight Championship (1 time)
- Premier Promotions
  - Worthing Trophy (2008)
- Pro Wrestling 101
  - PW101 Championship (1 time)
- Pro Wrestling 2.0
  - PW2.0 Tag Team Championship (1 time) – with Aaron Epic
- Pro Wrestling Illustrated
  - Ranked No. 135 of the top 500 singles wrestlers in the PWI 500 in 2009
- Real Quality Wrestling
  - RQW Heavyweight Championship (1 time)
- Revolution Pro Wrestling
  - Undisputed British Heavyweight Championship (2 times)
  - RPW Undisputed British Tag Team Championship (1 time) – with Joel Redman
- Ronin Pro Wrestling
  - RONIN Heavyweight Championship (1 time)
- United States Wrestling Alliance (Jacksonville, FL)
  - Wrestle Bowl (2016)
- Southern States Pro Wrestling
  - SSPW Heavyweight Championship (1 time)
- Wardust Wrestling League
  - WWL Championship (1 time)
- The Wrestling League
  - Wrestling League World Championship (1 time)
- Westside Xtreme Wrestling
  - wXw Tag Team Championship (1 time) – with Doug Williams
- World Xtreme Wrestling
  - WXW Tag Team Championship (1 time) – with Jody Kristofferson
- WWE
  - NXT Tag Team Championship (1 time) – with Oney Lorcan
