= Mark Sloan (wrestler) =

British professional wrestler

Personal information
- Born: 7 July 1978 (age 48) Portsmouth, Hampshire, England

Professional wrestling career
- Ring name: Mark Sloan
- Billed height: 5 ft 8 in (1.73 m)
- Billed weight: 163 lb (74 kg)
- Billed from: Fratton, Portsmouth
- Trained by: Dave Hines
- Debut: 1995

Mark Sloan (born 7 July 1978) is a British professional wrestler. Sloan is best known for his work with the Frontier Wrestling Alliance due to founding the promotion and being head trainer in the company's training academy, FWA Academy.

== Professional wrestling career ==
Mark Sloan started training to become a wrestler in 1990 and made his debut five years later on 19 September 1995.

In 1999, whilst working at Ross Records, Mark Sloan founded the Fratton Wrestling Alliance, the company which would go on to become the now defunct Frontier Wrestling Alliance of today. Sloan was the first ever holder of its FWA British Heavyweight Championship, defeating Paul Glory in a tournament on 11 July 1999, before losing the title to Alex Shane on 27 February 2000.

Sloan has also held the FWA All England Championship before, defeating former tag team partner Paul Travell on 1 September 2001 before losing the title to Zebra Kid a few months later.

Sloan would become the head trainer of FWA's main training school. While in the FWA Academy which is located in Sloan's hometown of Portsmouth, Sloan trained many future British wrestlers, most notably Drew McIntyre, a former WWE Intercontinental Champion and Paul Burchill and Katie Lea Burchill who went on to wrestle for the WWE's ECW brand, but also Hade Vansen, Andy Boy Simmonz, James Tighe, Luke (Fruit Corner) Horner, "The Star Attraction" Mark Haskins and The Enigma.

Sloan would go on to lead the EntouRAGE, a faction consisting of FWA Academy students working as heels during FWA main shows while acting as babyfaces during FWA:A shows. The EntouRAGE has consisted of Sloan, Ollie Burns, Alan Gallagher, Graham Hughes, Matt Campbell, Tyrone Johnson, Ant Lacayo and Wade Fitzgerald. While part of the EntouRAGE Sloan and Burns would often work as a tag team and soon became the first holders of FWA:A's tag team titles after defeating Dan James and Harry Mills in a tournament final to become first ever champions on 25 November 2005. They would hold the tag titles for a year before losing them to Joel Redman and then FWA:A Champion LT Summers in a Round Robin tournament.

Mark Sloan closed the FWA:A shortly afterwards, as he was unhappy at the poor attitude of new students as well as students leaving FWA:A after a few weeks/months and telling wrestling promoters that they had been trained by him in order to get work. He continues to train a small group of no more than eight students who he feels are sufficiently dedicated to forging a career in professional wrestling.

Currently, Sloan wrestles alongside Wade Fitzgerald as the tag team BritRAGE, as well as making singles appearances for IPW:UK. Additionally, he sells wrestling/MMA merchandise, fitness supplements and print services under the business name A-Merchandise. He also promoted Pro Wrestling Noah's debut in the UK at the Coventry Skydome, European Navigation 2008, in June 2008 and four shows of Dragon Gate in 2009 and 2010. Sloan also ran two hugely successful Pro Wrestling NOAH shows on 13–14 May in Broxbourne, Hertfordshire and Wolverhampton which included two GHC Heavyweight Championship title defences.

== Championships and accomplishments ==
- 4 Front Wrestling
  - 4FW Tag Team Championship (2 time) – with Ollie Burns, with Wade Fitzgerald
- Frontier Wrestling Alliance
  - FWA British Heavyweight Championship (1 time)
  - FWA All England Championship (1 time)
- FWA Academy
  - FWA Academy Tag Team Championship (1 time) – with Ollie Burns
- Premier Promotions
  - PWF Tag Team Championship (1 time) – with Mark Haskins
  - Tag Team Championship Tournament (2009) – with Mark Haskins
- Wrestle Zone Wrestling
  - WZW Inter-Promotional Championship (1 time)
