= Andrew Simmons =

British professional wrestler

Andrew Ivan Simmons
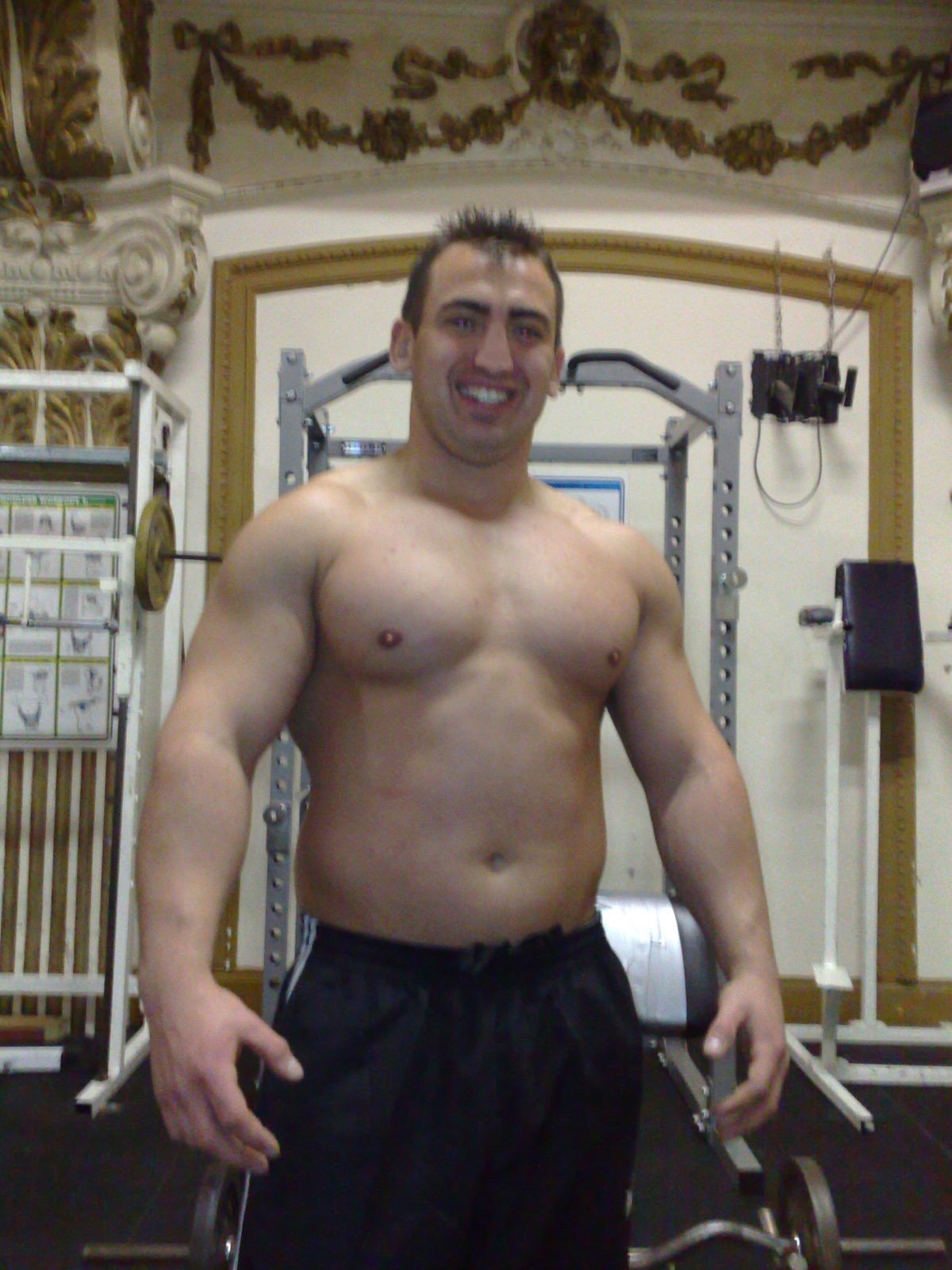
- Simmons in December 2008

Personal information
- Born: 21 May 1984 (age 42) Liss, Hampshire, England

Professional wrestling career
- Ring name(s): Andy Boy Simmonz; El Meano; The International Man of Mystery; Simmons; Simmons the Butler
- Billed height: 5 ft 7 in (1.70 m)
- Billed weight: 225 lb (102 kg)
- Billed from: Portsmouth, Hampshire
- Trained by: FWA Academy; Mark Sloan
- Debut: 2001

Andrew Simmons (born 21 May 1984), better known by his ring name Andy Boy Simmonz, is a British professional wrestler. He has worked on the independent circuit in the United Kingdom for several promotions. Simmons' most high-profile work in the UK came in the Frontier Wrestling Alliance under the face gimmick of Simmons the Butler. Simmons later returned to the FWA under the ring name Andy Boy Simmons but remained face.

The Boy in Simmons' ring name comes from his idol Davey Boy Smith, best known as WWF's British Bulldog. Simmons has taken on many elements of the Bulldog character including the ring gear and the finishing move.

== Professional wrestling career ==
He went to school in Liphook, Hampshire. Simmons first planned to train to become a wrestler at the NWA-UK Hammerlock training school, but not long after securing a week-long training session in August 2000 Simmons received news of a new training centre starting up in Portsmouth, The FWA Academy, which was 30 minutes away from him.

During 2004, Simmons would wrestle in Italy for the Italian Championship Wrestling promotion, and around the rest UK for All Star and Premier Promotions before finally leaving the FWA Academy for good. In May, Simmons defeated Tommy Stevens in a Tables Match to win a one night tournament for the EWF trophy at the Weymouth Pavilion in Weymouth, Dorset.

Outside of the more mainstream promotions Simmons competes for many independent promotions in the UK, most notably All Star, Real Quality Wrestling, Varsity Pro Wrestling and abroad on various European tours. During his time on the UK indies Simmons would begin teaming with Eamon O'Neill under the team name Irish Connection and later, The United Lions. During a tour of Italy in September 2006, Simmons suffered a broken ankle in a rumble match. Simmons was flown back early from the tour to have surgery which should have put him out of action until 2007.

=== Frontier Wrestling Alliance ===
Simmons' debut for the company was on 20 January 2001 at FWA Unknown Quantity 2 where he faced of in a Rookies Match against Dave Crispin, Simmons won the match with a victory roll, which he would later be named his Simmonz Roll. After this well received debut Simmons went undefeated for 18 months, but after his first defeat in the FWA Academy Simmons took time away to wrestle in The Wrestling Alliance.

After time away in the independent circuit, Simmons returned to the FWA Academy in 2003. During Simmons' time in the academy he wrestled against many of the up-and-coming British stars like James Tighe, Raj Ghosh, Mark Sloan, and Paul Burchill. Simmons also took part in the final TWA tour facing British wrestling superstars "The Anarchist" Doug Williams, Jody Fleisch, and Robbie Brookside.

Simmons came up into the FWA main roster with the gimmick of a stereotypical English butler, in the style of Jeeves in the Jeeves and Wooster novels. Within a year as The Duke of Danger's trusty butler sidekick, Simmons would become one of the most popular wrestlers in the FWA's history. As part of the tag-team Hampton Court with the Duke of Danger, and their valet "Buttercup". He would soon go on to hold the tag titles in the company with the Duke for a short time, before losing them to the team of Stixx & Martin Stone.

After another absence away from the FWA Simmons split away from Hampton Court but returned under the name Andy Boy Simmons. He set out to find a new tag partner, one he could team with to win the tag belts from the champs Stixx and Stone. Simmons return to FWA with new tag team partner, Eamon O'Neill, as The United Lions.

=== International Pro Wrestling: United Kingdom ===
Simmons has also appeared regularly in International Pro Wrestling: United Kingdom (IPW:UK) shows from late 2004 right through into 2006. During a show on 21 November 2004, Robbie Brookside defeated The International Man of Mystery 2–1 in a British Rules match after the match the Man of Mystery was unmasked as Simmons, but Brookside was then attacked by Stevie Douglas, Douglas went on to say that he was the real International Man of Mystery.

In 2005, Andy Boy Simmonz entered into IPW:UK's heavyweight division and became a fan favourite. In July 2005, Simmonz would also make his mark in IPW:UK's tag team division teaming with the British Bulldog's son, Harry "Bulldog" Smith as "British Beef". On 18 February 2006, however, Simmonz turned on the company's mainly internet based fans who regularly "booed" him and unsuccessfully attempted to de-throne IPW:UK Champion Martin Stone at the event in Orpington, Kent.

Simmonz soon fell back into his heel persona in IPW:UK and even had a bodyguard for a short time in June. Around this time, Simmonz won an over-the-top rumble at Battle Royale to earn himself any match of his choice in IPW:UK. However, by September, Simmonz had left IPW:UK (due to the injury he suffered on tour) claiming he was retiring without ever utilizing the stipulation. On 22 October 2006, while still incapacitated and in a wheelchair Simmonz used the stipulation to gain himself a No DQ, Falls Count Anywhere bout for the IPW:UK title. After help from Aviv Maayan and Simmons' former bodyguard, LT Summers, as well as a steel crutch, Simmonz became the third IPW:UK Champion. The team are known as the "Hated Heroes".

It was announced that at the cross over event IPW:UK vs New Generation Wrestling in Hull on Friday 13 February 2009, Simmonz would represent IPW to take on NGW's "Prima Donna" Nathan Cruz, a match which saw Simmonz win, thus earning the first point for team IPW, Simmonz later wrestled in an IPW vs NGW 6-man elimination tag team match which was won by NGW's Alex Cyanide when Cyanide pinned Simmonz.

=== 1 Pro Wrestling ===
Simmons would also become one of the British stars in the 1 Pro Wrestling roster from its inception in 2005, competing under his heel persona. Simmons appeared in 1PW's inaugural match the Proving Ground Battle Royal but didn't appear again on a 1PW card for several months for a brief stint before leaving the company once again.

In 2006, Simmons would make a return to 1PW as the surprise tag team partner from Lance Storm before working a pro wrestling storyline in which he would take open challenges from any competitor for a match. Simmonz's open challenges resulted in a long losing streak for Simmonz in 1PW.

=== Real Quality Wrestling ===
Simmons would also make appearances in Real Quality Wrestling as both a face and a heel. As a heel, Simmons would team with Aviv Maayan as The Hated Heroes. They participated in the RQW British Tag Team Tournament to have a chance of becoming RQW British Tag Team Champions. They made it to the final but were defeated by Team Charming. Simmons is also known for teaming with James Tighe as The Iron Lions.

=== World Wrestling Entertainment ===
During World Wrestling Entertainment shows held in London, England, Simmons has participated as an enhancement talent. Simmons was a part of WWE's 2006 tour of the United Kingdom where he worked for the company, competing on both its WWE Velocity and WWE Heat shows. Simmons would compete against Matt Hardy in a singles match on Velocity and teamed with Eric Schwarz to face the team of Goldust and Snitsky during Heat.

On 15 October 2007 Birmingham, England edition of WWE Raw, Simmons competed in a few squash matches against Umaga. He was put through 3 types of matches by Mr. McMahon: a Street Fight, a First Blood Match, and a Steel Cage Match. Simmons lost all three matches.

=== Irish Whip Wrestling ===
In June 2008, Simmons took part in an Irish Whip Wrestling Show in the ESB Arena in Dublin where he beat Chad Collyer.

=== Fightstar Sports Entertainment ===
On 16 November 2010, Simmons competed in a Championship Tournament for Fightstar Sports Entertainment's vacant All-Counties Championship at the Barrington Centre in Ferndown, Dorset. After beating X-Con in the first round, he went on to win the title in the main event Triple Threat match that night, beating Jivin' Jay Knox and 'Iron Hulk' Karl Atlas to lift the title.

=== Revolution Pro (2012–2020) ===
Simmons was an active competitor and trainer for Revolution Pro Wrestling at the FWA's former training facility. He made his last main show RevPro match in 2014. Andy retired from wrestling in 2020 after a recurring back injury.

== Championships and accomplishments ==
- Sports Entertainment Wrestling
  - King Of The Ring Tournament (2009)
- British Real Attitude Wrestling League
  - BRAWL Heavyweight Championship (1 time)
- Catch Wrestling Council
  - CWC All-In Championship (1 time)
- Celtic Wrestling
  - CW Tag Team Championship (1 time) – with Thomas Bassey
- Championship Wrestling League
  - CWL Heavyweight Championship (1 time,)
- European Wrestling Federation
  - EWF Trophy (2004)
- Extreme World Wrestling
  - EWW St. George's Championship (1 time)
- Fightstar Sports Entertainment
  - FSE All-Counties Championship (1 time, inaugural)
  - FSE All-Countries Title Tournament (2010)
- Frontier Wrestling Alliance
  - FWA Tag Team Championship (1 time) – with Duke of Danger
- International Pro Wrestling: United Kingdom
  - IPW:UK Championship (2 times)
  - ICW Tag Team Championship (1 time) – with James Tighe
  - Selsey Cup (2009)
- Italian Championship Wrestling
  - ICW Italian Tag Team Championship (1 Time) - with James Tighe
- Premier Promotions
  - PWF Tag Team Championship (1 time) - with Rishi Ghosh
  - PWF Welterweight Championship (1 time)
- Revolution Pro Wrestling
  - Dirty 24/7 Championship (1 time)
- Solent Wrestling Federation
  - SWF Tag Team Championship (1 time, inaugural) - with Flash Barker
  - SWF Tag Team Title Tournament (2011) – with Flash Barker
