= All-England Championship =

Professional wrestling championship

IPW:UK All-England Championship

Details
- Promotion: International Pro Wrestling: United Kingdom
- Date established: 9 July 2001
- Date retired: 24 September 2017

Other names
- FWA All England Championship (2001 - 2007); All England Championship (2007); IPW:UK All England Championship (2007 - 2017)
Statistics
- First champion: Scottie Rock
- Final champion: Earl Black Jr
- Most reigns: Jonny Storm (3 times)
- Longest reign: Hade Vansen (729 days)
- Shortest reign: Jonny Storm (1 day)

The IPW:UK All-England Championship (formerly the FWA All-England Championship) was a professional wrestling championship which was originally contested for in Frontier Wrestling Alliance (FWA) and subsequently in International Pro Wrestling: United Kingdom (IPW:UK) after FWA's closure. The title was established in 2001 and existed for eight years until it was unified with the IPW:UK Championship in September 2009. The IPW:UK Championship and the All-England Championship were de-unified in 2012 through until the company closing in 2017.

== History ==
=== FWA ===
The genesis of the All-England title had its roots in the weekly FWA TV show on Portsmouth's MyTV channel in the summer of 2001. With the main FWA title held by Doug Williams, and Williams in a storyline dispute with the promotion's commissioner, Victoria De Montfort, a decision was made to focus on a secondary belt as a TV championship. At the time, the FWA had been using the FWA European Union Championship as a secondary title, and with the company's ownership keen on promoting a particularly English flavour to the show, the title was renamed the All-England championship, a nod to the organisation running the Wimbledon tennis championships.

Scottie Rock, the last-recognised EU Champion, had been coming to the ring wearing the belt, which at that point was not recognised on the TV show. This was explained away as being a "gypsy fighting championship" belt by the commentary team. Nevertheless, Rock and Johnny Storm were chosen to compete for the initial championship, won by Storm in Portsmouth in July 2001.

The championship was initially envisaged as being a Brits-only competition. However, Ahmed Chaer, a Turkish-German wrestler from the German Stampede Wrestling promotion, was given the title to cement a short-lived alliance between the two promotions, though he lost it on his first defence a week later, to Paul Travell. Although the belt would then revert to its homegrown roots, the American Chris Hamrick would also later hold the title.

=== IPW:UK ===
Former champion Leroy Kincade, who defeated Hade Vansen on 19 October 2005, was stripped of the title on 19 November 2006 after siding with International Pro Wrestling: United Kingdom in an inter-promotional feud with FWA. Kincade first put his title reign in jeopardy on October 7 of that year by competing in an unsanctioned All-England Title defence at an IPW:UK show. Even though FWA had a working relationship with the promotion, and Kincade in fact retained the title, FWA refused to recognise the result of the match as the FWA management team did not agree for IPW:UK to use the All-England Title name and belt on their show. This continued with Kincade repeatedly siding with IPW:UK and scheduling his own title defences before finally being stripped of the FWA All-England Championship.

Kincade continued to defend the belt even though not officially being champion. However the next official champion would be FWA loyalist Iceman who defeated Kincade at an IPW show. Prior to the match, the FWA announced it would sanction the Title match only if Iceman won.

During the Final Frontiers show, IPW:UK wrestler Sam Slam won the title from Iceman. However, this show also saw IPW:UK win the inter-promotional feud and put FWA out of business, leaving the titles status unclear. FWA would also revive itself as XWA but would sever all ties with the All-England Championship. The title would continue to operate in IPW:UK for just under two years, being part of the British National Championship tournament in 2008, until it was unified into the IPW:UK Championship.

On 15 September 2012, Sha Samuels, holder of the IPW:UK Championship, un-unified the IPW:UK World and IPW:UK All-England belts, putting the All-England title back into active duty through until the company's closure in September 2017.

== Title history ==
Key
No.	Overall reign number
Reign	Reign number for the specific champion
Days	Number of days held
†	Championship change is unrecognized by the promotion
<1	Reign lasted less than a day

No.	Champion	Championship change			Reign statistics		Notes	Ref.
No.	Champion	Date	Event	Location	Reign	Days	Notes	Ref.
1	Scottie Rock	9 July 2001	Live event	N/A	1	20	Became champion when FWA European Union Championship stopped being recognised.	
2	Jonny Storm	29 July 2001	No Surprises	Portsmouth, Hampshire	1	28		
3	Ahmed Chaer	26 August 2001	Broken Rulz	Essen, Germany	1	6	Chaer defeats Storm and Crazy Sexy Mike at a Westside Xtreme Wrestling (wXw) event in a Winner Takes All Triangle Match for the wXw Highflying Trophy, FWA All-England Championship and Athletik Club Wrestling (ACW) International Championship, respectively.	
4	Paul Travell	1 September 2001	Trick or Treat	Harrow, London	1	104	Three way match also involving Scottie Rock.	
5	Mark Sloan	14 December 2001	Lights, Camera, Acton	Acton, London	1	203		
6	Zebra Kid	5 July 2002	Vendetta	Telford, Shropshire	1	290^{(254)}		
†	Jack Xavier	16 March 2003	Crunch	Broxbourne, Hertfordshire	1	1	Masked wrestler Jack Xavier defeats Zebra Kid then reveals himself to be Jack Xavier while under suspension.	
6	Zebra Kid	17 March 2003	Live event	N/A	2	290^{(35)}	Championship returned to Zebra Kid when it is revealed that Xavier won the title while suspended.	
7	Chris Hamrick	21 April 2003	Live event	Morecambe, Yorkshire	1	5		
8	Jonny Storm	26 April 2003	Live event	Sudbury, Suffolk, Suffolk	2	1		
9	Zebra Kid	27 April 2003	Live event	Portsmouth, Hampshire	2^{(3)}	174		
—		18 October 2003	British Uprising 2	Bethnal Green, London			Zebra Kid forfeits the title by no-showing a scheduled title defence against Flash Barker.	
10	Hade Vansen	18 October 2003	British Uprising 2	Bethnal Green, London	1	729	Defeats Flash Barker to win the vacant title after replacing Zebra Kid.	
11	Leroy Kincaide	16 October 2005	Hotwired	Broxbourne, Hertfordshire	1	469	FWA stopped recognising Kincaide as champion on November 19, 2006 when he sided with IPW:UK but was re-recognised for his defence against FWA wrestler Iceman	
12	Iceman	28 January 2007	No Escape	Orpington, Kent	1	56	Defeated Kincaide in a match which FWA would only recognise if Iceman won.	
13	Sam Slam	25 March 2007	IPW:UK vs. FWA: Final Frontiers	Orpington, Kent	1	553	Championship renamed All-England Championship when FWA closes at this event.	
14	Jonny Moss	28 September 2008	Fourth Anniversary Tour	Wolverhampton, West Midlands	1	28	Defeated Sam Slam in the quarter-finals of the British National Championship.	
15	Terry Frazier	26 October 2008	British National Finale	Bromley, Kent	1	252	Defeated Jonny Moss in the British National Championship final.	
16	Leroy Kincaide	5 July 2009	Summer Sizzler	Sittingbourne, Kent	2	70	Defeats Frazier for title and contendership for the IPW:UK Championship.	
—	Unified	13 September 2009	5th Anniversary Show	Sittingbourne, Kent	—	—	Unified with IPW:UK Championship when Kincaide defeats champion Alex Shane. Loses the RPW British Heavyweight Championship to Dave Mastiff on October 21, 2010	
17	Sha Samuels	15 September 2012	Samuels vs. Frazier 2012	Swanley, Kent	1	245	Sometime in 2012 or 2013, Samuels claims he never unified the belts. He de-unified them to crown himself a double champ and IPW:UK Triple-Crown Champion	
18	Zack Sabre, Jr	18 May 2013	Royale Rewards 2013	Swanley, Kent	1	155		
19	Jonny Storm	20 October 2013	IPW:UK vs. The LSLL #3	Bethnal Green, London	3	217		
20	Darrell Allen	25 May 2014	Royale Rewards 2014	Tonbridge, Kent	1	175	Defeats Storm in the semi-finals of the British National Championship.	
21	RJ Singh	16 November 2014	Unfinished Business 2014	Snodland, Kent	1	55		
—		10 January 2015	Weekend of Champions Night 1	Tonbridge, Kent			Vacated due to RJ Singh retiring.	
22	Grado	15 March 2015	Battle Royale 2015	Tonbridge, Kent	1	<1	Won a 30 man battle royal for the vacant title.	
23	Jimmy Havoc	15 March 2015	Battle Royale 2015	Tonbridge, Kent	1	188	Defeated Bad Bones on August 9, 2015 to win the IPW:UK World Championship as it was a title vs. title match.	
24	Sammy Smooth	19 September 2015	Future 8 2015	Tonbridge, Kent	1	399	IPW:UK World Championship was not on-the-line.	
25	Scott Star	22 October 2016	Future 8 2016	Selsdon, Surrey	1	3,603		
26	Earl Black Jr.	23 July 2017	Supershow 10	Rochester, Kent	1	61	Won an 8-man "Super Scrum" against Scott Star, Adam Maxted, El Phantasmo, Jonathan Windsor, Sammy Smooth, Sid Scala, and Spud.	

The title was declared vacant and retired on 24 September 2017.

== Combined reigns ==
Rank	Champion	No. of reigns	Combined days
1	Hade Vansen	1	729
2	Sam Slam	1	553
3	Leroy Kincaide	2	539
4	Sammy Smooth	2	462
5	Zebra Kid	3	461
6	Sha Samuels	2	270
7	Terry Frazier	1	252
8	Jonny Storm	1	245
9	Scott Star	2	211
10	Mark Sloan	1	203
11	Jimmy Havoc	1	188
12	Darrell Allen	1	175
13	Zack Sabre Jr.	1	155
14	Paul Travell	1	104
15	Earl Black Jr.	1	61
16	Iceman	1	56
17	RJ Singh	1	55
18	Johnny Moss	1	28
19	Scottie Rock	1	20
20	Ahmed Chaer	1	7
21	Chris Hamrick	1	5
22	Jack Xavier	1	3
23	Grado	1	<1

== See also ==
- Professional wrestling in the United Kingdom
