= Jimmy Havoc =

British professional wrestler (born 1984)

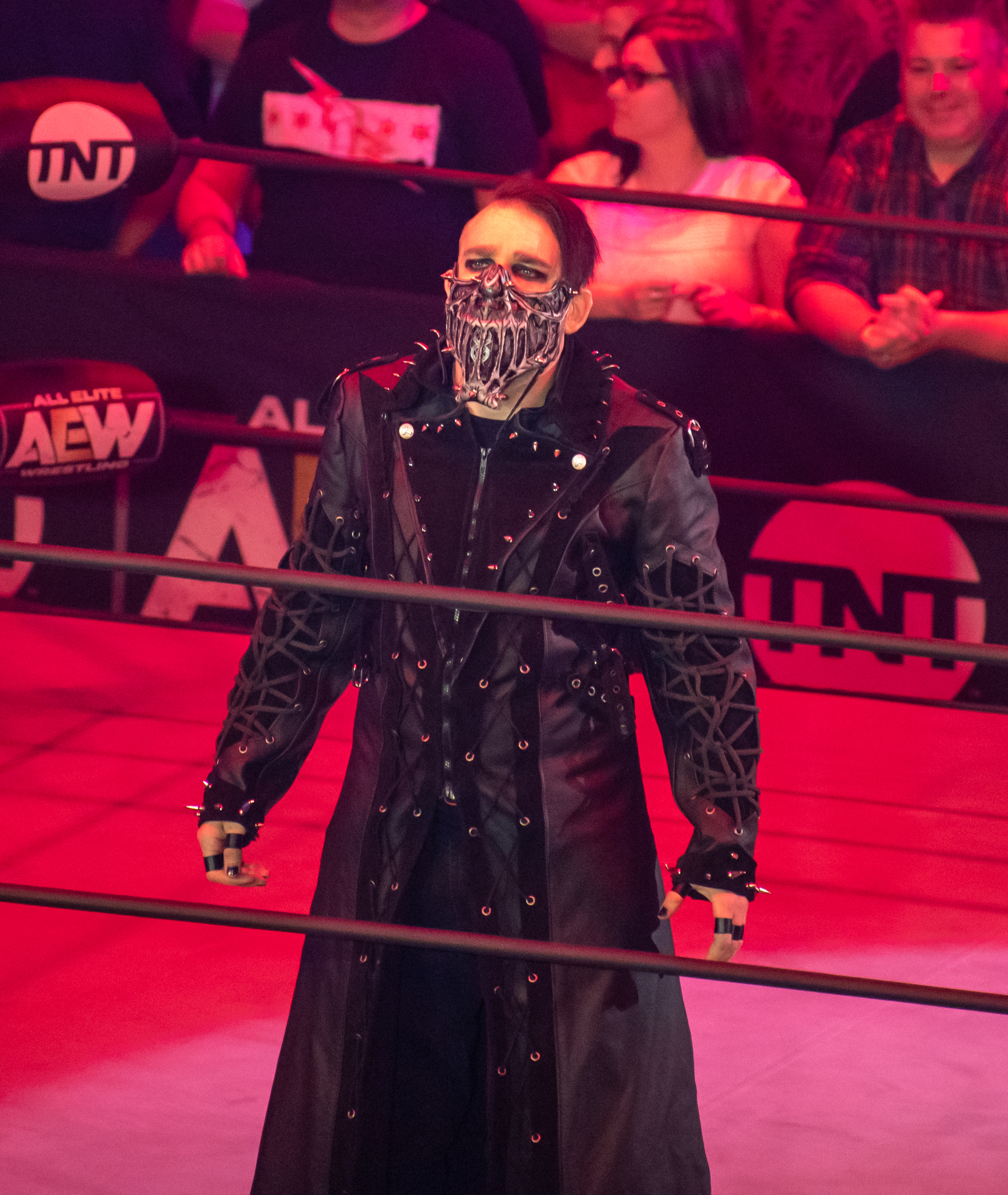
- Havoc in October 2019

Personal information
- Born: James McAhren; 19 March 1984 (age 42) Dartford, Kent, England

Professional wrestling career
- Ring name: Jimmy Havoc
- Billed height: 5 ft 10 in (1.78 m)
- Billed weight: 14 st (196 lb; 89 kg)
- Billed from: Camden, London, England
- Trained by: Andre Baker; Jon Ryan
- Debut: 2004
- Retired: 2021

James McAhren (born 19 March 1984), better known by his ring name Jimmy Havoc, is a British former professional wrestler. He is best known for his work with Defiant Wrestling, Insane Championship Wrestling (ICW), Major League Wrestling (MLW) and All Elite Wrestling (AEW).

== Professional wrestling career ==
=== Independent circuit (2004–2020) ===
Jimmy Havoc trained at NWA UK Hammerlock under Andre Baker and Jon Ryan, alongside the likes of Zack Sabre Jr. and Fergal Devitt before making his debut in 2004. Wrestling exclusively under the Hammerlock banner until 2006, he made his first appearances outside of the promotion for Triple X Wrestling where he first started appearing as a "deathmatch" or hardcore wrestler. He quickly became known as one of the top deathmatch wrestlers in Europe, debuting for International Pro Wrestling: United Kingdom in 2008, Germany's Westside Xtreme Wrestling in 2009 and appearing on a joint show between wXw and U.S. hardcore promotion Combat Zone Wrestling in 2010. Havoc appeared in European versions of the CZW Tournament of Death in both 2010 and 2012. As of 2013, he has made appearances in other independent companies such as Mid-Atlantic Wrestling and Full Impact Pro.

In February 2015, he captured the FPW Championship, adding the IPW:UK All-England Championship in March. In August 2015, he became IPW:UK World Heavyweight Champion after defeating Bad Bones in a TLC match.

Also towards the end of February 2016, Havoc made special appearances for Melbourne City Wrestling. His first one was at MCW At Out Best where he faced Mikey Nicholls from TMDK. However, he got injured at the St Kilda Festival, and missed out on facing Mr Juicy at MCW Uncensored.

On 4 October 2016, it was announced that Jimmy Havoc would be making his Canadian debut for Smash Wrestling on their 4th Anniversary Tour in November 2016.

On 18 March 2017, he and Clint Margera wrestled as "Callous Hearts" in a losing effort against #CCK (Chris Brookes & Kid Lykos) in the Dream Tag Team Invitational qualifier match at Fight Club: Pro The First Female Of Fight Club.

On 23 July 2017, Havoc defeated Carlito retaining the IPW:UK World Heavyweight Championship. On 6 July Havoc defeated Joseph Conners and Pete Dunne for the British Wrestling Revolution Heavyweight Championship.

=== Insane Championship Wrestling (2012–2018) ===
On 1 April 2012, Havoc made his debut for Insane Championship Wrestling, at 'So's Yer Maw' in The Garage, tagging with Iceman against Jack Jester & Chris Renfrew. A few months later, Havoc would face Renfrew again, in the first ever Scottish Rules match, with the final result coming to 1-1. One month later, he would compete as part of Team ICW in a Glasgow Street Fight, defeating The Official Community. On 2 September 2012 at ICW: Hadouken!, Havoc challenged Andy Wild for the ICW Zero-G Championship but was defeated.

In 2013, Havoc would enter a rivalry with James Scott, who took exception to Jimmy's hardcore style of wrestling. This led to a 2 out of 3 falls match, which Havoc would go on to win. Shortly after this, Havoc was at odds with the New Age Kliq, first competing in tag team match alongside Jack Jester, that was deemed too violent to air on YouTube. As the rivalry continued, Jimmy defeated BT Gunn in ICW's first ever Thumbtack Kickpad match, for the right to face Rhyno at Fear & Loathing VI. After James Scott was later added to the match, Havoc defeated both Scott & Rhyno in a Three Way Dance at Fear & Loathing VI.

On 24 January 2016, Havoc entered the ICW Square Go! match. On 19 November, Havoc defeated Bram.

After competing in the Square Go match in early 2017, Havoc returned at Shug's Hoose Party 4, appearing from inside a coffin to attack Mikey Whiplash, and announce the first ever King Of Insanity match at Fear & Loathing X. Battling Mikey Whiplash, Chris Renfrew & Stevie Boy on the Road To Fear & Loathing Tour, Havoc would be unsuccessful in the King Of Insanity match, losing to Stevie Boy.

Havoc would not be seen again in ICW until 1 April 2018, when he returned to The Garage to face Mikey Whiplash in a Death Match for the chance to challenge for the ICW World Heavyweight Championship, with Mikey gaining the victory by delivering a Zombie Maker to Havoc through a sheet of glass. Havoc then teamed with Mark Haskins in late 2018, defeating the Kings Of Catch, and gaining a spot in a 6 team Tables, Ladders, and Chairs match at Fear & Loathing XI.

=== Progress Wrestling (2012–2019) ===
Havoc debuted for Progress Wrestling on the Chapter Two event in May 2012 and went on to lose six matches without registering a victory, though became very popular with the Progress fans as an underdog babyface. In November 2013, at Chapter Nine, Havoc attacked promoter Jim Smallman, and aligned himself with the London Riots, turning heel in the process. Havoc would then use an open contract given to him by Smallman to defeat Progress Champion Mark Andrews (who had just wrestled both Paul Robinson and Rampage Brown in consecutive matches) to become champion and pick up his first victory in Progress.

In his first title defence at Chapter Eleven, Havoc defeated Zack Sabre Jr. with the help of his newest associate, Progress trainee "The Omega" Isaac Zercher. Havoc was joined at Chapter Thirteen by Paul Robinson, and the group later christened themselves "Regression" as a play on the name of the company and to symbolize their hatred of Progress Wrestling. The group lost its first members at Chapter Fifteen, as the four members of the group (not including Zercher) took on Progress Tag Team Champions Eddie Dennis and Mark Andrews, Will Ospreay and Noam Dar in a "titles vs careers" match. Ospreay pinned James Davis of the London Riots, meaning that the Riots were gone from Progress. Havoc eventually lost the title at Chapter Twenty to Ospreay in a no disqualification match, with his 609-day reign equalling that of all previous champions combined. At Chapter Twenty-One, Havoc and Robinson were placed in a number one contenders no disqualification match against each other. The two engaged in a bloody contest with Robinson emerging victorious, seemingly signalling the end of Regression. After the match, a beaten and bloody Havoc was helped to his feet by Smallman, his longtime nemesis, and left the Electric Ballroom to a thunderous standing ovation from a respectful crowd.

On 25 September 2016, over a year since he was last seen in the promotion, Havoc returned to Progress at Chapter Thirty-Six during the main event for the Progress Championship involving Marty Scurll, Tommy End and Mark Haskins. Havoc would cost Scurll the title whilst saving Smallman from an attack from the then-champion, turning face again in the process. After attacking Scurll again at Chapter 37, Havoc was part of a triple-threat match for the Progress Championship at Chapter 38, facing both Scurll and then-champion Haskins, who retained the title. At Chapter 39, he defeated Scurll by DQ, thus advancing to a 7-way elimination match for the vacant Progress championship making to the final two but lost to Pete Dunne after Tyler Bate attacked him. At Chapter 40 Havoc defeat Scurll in a No Disqualification match, ending their feud and becoming the number one contender to the Progress World Championship. On Progress's final show of 2016, Havoc faced his old rival Will Ospreay in a winning effort, after the match Havoc apologized to Ospreay for his past actions and ask to join him and fight British Strong Style. Ospreay initially accepted, but then brutally attacked Havoc alongside Paul Robinson, turning heel and restarting their feud.

At Chapter 43, Havoc defeated Pete Dunne in a championship match by disqualification after Trent Seven interfered. After the match Dunne and Seven continued attacking Havoc until Mark Haskins and Flash Morgan Webster rescued Havoc, leading to a six-man tag match at Chapter 44, where Haskins, Webster, and Havoc defeated British Strong Style, when Havoc pinned Dunne, thus winning another championship match. Havoc got his opportunity at Chapter 45 but was defeated by Dunne after Ospreay's interference, leading to a Fans Bring The Weapons match at chapter 46. During the match, Ospreay challenged Havoc to put their Progress contracts at stake, Havoc defeated Ospreay, thus expelling him from Progress and ending the feud. In May, Havoc entered the Super Strong Style 16 tournament, but was eliminated in the first round by the eventual winner, Travis Banks. Havoc then started to team with Mark Haskins, but they were defeated by The Origin (Zack Gibson & Nathan Cruz) at Chapter 50 and by British Strong Style(Trent Seven & Tyler Bate) in a match for the Progress Tag Team Championships at Chapter 53, after the latter match Havoc confronted Haskins about being distracted during the match, when Dunne took Haskins' wife hostage, and started a brawl thus turning heel once again. At Chapter 54 they were forced to team again against rivals Pete Dunne and Travis Banks in a losing effort, when Havoc walked out on Haskins. This led to Haskins challenging Havoc to a Deathmatch at Chapter 55, where Havoc was victorious. In the following chapter, Jimmy joined with Haskins and his wife to form a new faction by attacking a defenceless Jack Sexsmith who was then saved by David Starr. At Chapter 57, Havoc and Haskins defeated Sexsmith and Matt Riddle.

At Chapter 63, Havoc and Haskins defeated the Grizzled Young Veterans to win the Progress Tag Team Titles. At Chapter 64, Havoc & Haskins lost the tag titles back to Grizzled Young Veterans. After failed to regain the championships at Chapter 65, Havoc and Haskins would ally with Morgan Webster, starting a victory streak in six man tag team matches. Havoc would start a losing streak in Death matches losing against Joey Janela at Chapter 68, Spike Trivet at Chapter 71 and against Drew Parker on Chapter 73. He would finally defeat Ricky Shane Page in an ECW rules match at the first night of the Coust to Coast tour on the USA. On the four night of the tour, Havoc unsiccesfully challenged Walter for the Progress World Championship. Havoc was challenged by his former rival Will Ospreay, who had recently returned to the promotion, to a 2 out of 3 falls No Disqualification match at Chapter 75, Ospreay would win the match 2-1 after the special guest referee Paul Robinson interfered and attacked Havoc. This led to a match at Chapter 76: Hello Wembley!, where Havoc defeated Paul Robinson in a No Disqualification match. At Chapter 77, Havoc was defeated by his tag team partner Mark Haskins in a triple threat match that also included Chris Brookes to become the number one contender for the Progress World Championship, during the match he was attacked and taken out by Drew Parker. This led to a match between the two at Chapter 79, however, before the match could start Havoc was attacked by Spike Trivet who was joined by Drew Parker, William Eaver and Chuck Mambo, thus starting a new faction called Do Not Resuscitate.

On 18 April 2019 it was announced by Progress Wrestling that Havoc would be wrestling his final match for the company on 6 May 2019, day three of that year's Super Strong Style 16 tournament. Havoc subsequently lost to Paul Robinson. He returned to PROGRESS Chapter 100: Unboxing Live IV - A New Hope where he defeated David Starr in a deathmatch.

=== Total Nonstop Action Wrestling (2016) ===
In February 2016, Havoc entered Total Nonstop Action Wrestling saying he had "unfinished business" with Decay's valet Rosemary, Decay would later confront Havoc, with the ensuing beat down leading to Havoc taking on Abyss in a losing effort in a "no disqualification match" on 1 March episode of Impact Wrestling. On 4 March, Havoc teamed with Big Damo for TNA's One Night Only: Joker's Wild pay-per-view losing to Drew Galloway and Mike Bennett. Havoc also unsuccessfully competed for the TNA King of the Mountain Championship in a King of the Mountain match against champion Eric Young, Bram, Big Damo and Will Ospreay on the edition of 8 March of Impact Wrestling.

=== What Culture Pro/Defiant Wrestling (2016–2018) ===
Havoc moved to What Culture Pro Wrestling after his stint in CZW, Havoc faced Primate to crown the inaugural WCPW Hardcore Champion. On 11 February 2017, it was announced he, along with other wrestlers, would make his What Culture Pro Wrestling (WCPW) debut in the Pro Wrestling World Cup 2017, participating in the English Qualifier that will take place on 21 March 2017.

At WCPW Refuse To Lose, after War Machine retained the WCPW Tag Team Championships against The Young Bucks, Primate came out to get his Hardcore Championship back from ringside. War Machine didn't let him get his belt back. Havoc came out and announced that on Loaded, Havoc and Primate would face War Machine for the WCPW Tag Team Championships, which Havoc and Primate won. At #WeAreDefiant Havoc faced Primate for the new Defiant Hardcore Championship in a losing effort. On the second episode of Defiant, Havoc and Primate defeated BT Gunn and Joe Coffey to retain the Defiant Tag Team Championships.

On the edition of 9 February 2018 of Defiant's YouTube show, Havoc defeated his tag team partner to win the Hardcore Championship.

On edition of 9 March 2018 of Defiant' YouTube show Havoc turned on his tag team partner Primate and would voluntarily take the pin allowing Aussie Open (Kyle Fletcher and Mark Davis) to capture the tag team titles. However, Mark Haskins would attack them afterwards with Havoc joining him. Havoc would then announce to the crowd that he and Haskins are now a team. On 19 March, at Lights Out, Havoc and Haskins would participate in a triple threat for the tag titles, but would lose after mysteriously Primate's ape mask was thrown into the ring causing a distraction and allowing Aussie Open to capitalize and retain the titles. On 26 March, at Road to No Regrets, in a rematch they would beat Aussie Open and the team of Joe Coffey and BT Gunn to capture the tag titles. Haskins & Havoc eventually lost the tag titles back to Aussie Open. Some time after losing the tag titles, Havoc and Haskins turned face and entered into a rivalry with the Anti-Fun Police.

At Unstoppable, Havoc was set to defend the Hardcore Title against No Fun Dunne, but had to vacate the title due to an injury.

=== Combat Zone Wrestling (2017) ===
It was announced via Twitter in February 2017, that Havoc would be the first British wrestler to compete in CZW's Tournament of Death. He defeated Conor Claxton in the finals to win the tournament. Havoc then faced Jimmy Jacobs on 9 December at CZW Cage of Death 19. in a losing effort.

=== Major League Wrestling (2017–2019) ===
Jimmy Havoc wrestled for Major League Wrestling starting in December 2017 until October 2018. He competed in no-rules match against Sami Callihan in October. Callihan put Havoc in a body bag and hit him with a piledriver to finish the match. Following the loss, he disappeared from the promotion. In early 2019 vignettes begun airing hyping his return. In early March, it was announced that he would be wrestling MLW World Heavyweight Champion Tom Lawlor for the championship, at MLW Rise of the Renegades in a street fight. On 4 April 2019 the match took place, when Havoc lost. He later joined Promociones Dorado and began being promoted by Salina de la Renta and also started feuding with Mance Warner.

=== All Elite Wrestling (2019–2020) ===
On 5 February 2019, Jimmy Havoc announced that he had officially signed with All Elite Wrestling (AEW). He debuted at Double or Nothing as a part of the pre-show battle royale for an AEW World Championship opportunity. He lasted until the final four, before being eliminated by Luchasaurus. At Fyter Fest, he lost a 4-Way match against Jungle Boy, Maxwell Jacob Friedman and Hangman Page, with Page emerging victorious. At Fight For The Fallen, Havoc lost a six-man tag team match with Darby Allin and Joey Janela against the team of Maxwell Jacob Friedman, Sammy Guevara and Shawn Spears. At All Out, Jimmy Havoc defeated Darby Allin and Joey Janela in a Cracker Barrel Clash Three Way match, pinning Janela with an Acid Rainmaker through a barrel. After that, he worked in Dynamite but mostly in YouTube's program Dark.

On 9 November 2019, it was reported that Havoc had an altercation with Excalibur at Tony Schiavone's birthday party, which was being held at Jimmy's Famous Seafood in Baltimore. Tony Khan commented on the fight between the two during the media scrum for AEW Full Gear, claiming that "I wouldn’t call it a fight, I’ve seen a lot worse in the world of football, both in England and the NFL — I’ve seen a lot worse, and I saw a lot worse tonight. They scrapped around and it was cool yesterday."

On 15 April 2020, Havoc began teaming with Kip Sabian after he delivered a DDT to Orange Cassidy on the floor during Sabian's match against Chuck Taylor. They made their tag team debut losing to Best Friends in a no disqualifications tag team match on the 29 April 2020 edition of Dynamite. They would subsequently call themselves The SuperBad Squad. They defeated SoCal Uncensored's Frankie Kazarian and Scorpio Sky in a number one contender's match for the AEW World Tag Team Championship on 2 May. They faced the champions Kenny Omega and "Hangman" Adam Page on 3 June for the titles in a losing effort.

Havoc was released by AEW on 13 August 2020, ending his alliance with Sabian.

== Speaking Out allegations ==
On June 19, 2020, it was announced that McAhren would attend counselling and rehabilitation after allegations were made of rape, abusive behaviour, and assault. The allegations were made during the Speaking Out movement. AEW stated his employment status would be evaluated following the completion of treatment. McAhren was released after finishing treatment.

== Championships and accomplishments ==
- Anarchy Pro Wrestling
  - Anarchy Pro Heavyweight Championship (1 time)
- British Wrestling Revolution
  - BWR Heavyweight Championship (1 time)
- Championship of Wrestling
  - CoW Interstate Championship (1 time)
- Combat Zone Wrestling
  - Tournament of Death 16 (2017)
- Defiant Wrestling/WhatCulture Pro Wrestling
  - Defiant Hardcore Championship (1 time)
  - Defiant/WCPW Tag Team Championship (2 times) - with Primate (1) and Mark Haskins (1)
- Dragon Pro Wrestling
  - All-Wales Championship (1 time)
- Future Pro Wrestling
  - Future Pro Wrestling Championship (1 time)
- International Pro Wrestling: United Kingdom
  - IPW:UK All-England Championship (1 time)
  - IPW:UK World Championship (1 time)
  - Tag Team Tournament (2017) – with Zack Sabre Jr.
- Lucha Britannia
  - Lucha Britannia World Championship (1 time)
- NWA UK Hammerlock
  - NWA United Kingdom Junior Heavyweight Championship (1 time)
  - Hardcore Lottery Tournament (2007)
- Progress Wrestling
  - Progress Championship (1 time)
  - Progress Tag Team Championship (1 time) - with Mark Haskins
- Pro Wrestling Illustrated
  - PWI ranked him #147 of the top 500 singles wrestlers in the PWI 500 in 2017
- Royal Imperial Wrestling
  - RIW Heavyweight Championship (1 time)
- Southside Wrestling Entertainment
  - SWE Tag Team Championship (1 time) – with Joseph Connors and The Pledge
  - SWE Speed King Championship (1 time)
- Triple X Wrestling
  - TXW Smash Championship (1 time)
- X Wrestling Alliance
  - Goldrush (2015)
