= XPW European Championship =

Professional wrestling championship

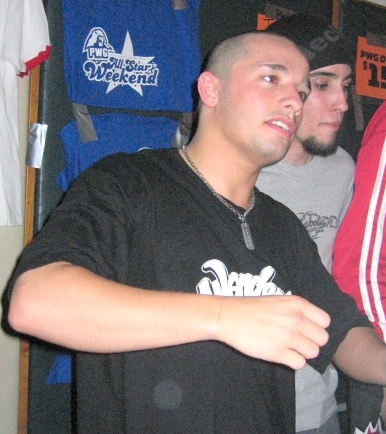
- Jonny Storm, first and only European champion

Details
- Promotion: Xtreme Pro Wrestling; Frontier Wrestling Alliance
- Date established: March 16, 2003
- Date retired: January 1, 2005
Statistics
- First champion: Jonny Storm
- Final champion: Jonny Storm

The XPW European Championship is a former professional wrestling title defended in Xtreme Pro Wrestling (XPW) and the Frontier Wrestling Alliance (FWA).

The championship was created in 2003 through a working relationship between XPW and the FWA. This was to be the flagship of the working relationship as the title would be defended throughout Europe and would appear on both promotions respective television programmes, however the title's primary home was to be the FWA. Though it was defended in the FWA, the belt itself was never actually seen, due to XPW folding shortly after the tournament final that determined the first champion and keeping the physical championship belt in the United States. Jonny Storm, the winner of the tournament, continued to defend the championship which was supposedly in the briefcase he carried with him around the world until January 2005 when Storm officially vacated and retired the title.

== First champion^{1} ==
Round One
Zebra Kid	DRAW^{2}
"Wild Cat" Robbie Brookside
Jonny Storm
Juventud Guerrera
Psicosis
Simon Diamond
Jerry Lynn
Chris Hamrick

Round Two
BYE
Jonny Storm
Psicosis
Jerry Lynn

Finals
Jonny Storm
Jerry Lynn

1. Zebra Kid, Robbie Brookside, Jonny Storm and Juventuded Guerrera wrestled representing FWA. Psicosis, Simon Diamond, Jerry Lynn and Chris Hamrick wrestled representing XPW.
2. The match ended in a Double Red Card as both men failed to return to the ring before a 20 count.

== Title history ==
#	Wrestler	Reign	Date	Days held	Location	Event	Notes	Ref.
1	Jonny Storm	1	March 16, 2003	657	Broxbourne, England	FWA Crunch 2003	Defeated Jerry Lynn in a tournament final.	
-	Deactivated	-	January 1, 2005	N/A	N/A	N/A		

== See also ==
- Professional wrestling in the United Kingdom
