= FWA Tag Team Championship =

Professional wrestling tag team championship

Details
- Promotion: Frontier Wrestling Alliance
- Date established: March 24, 2000
- Date retired: December 19, 2006
Statistics
- First champion(s): The New Breed (Ashe and Curve)
- Final champion(s): Stixx & Stone (Stixx and Martin Stone)
- Most reigns: The Family (Paul Travell, Raj Ghosh, Scott Parker, Brandon Thomas, Ashe, and Ian DaCypl) (3 reigns)
- Longest reign: Stixx & Stone (Stixx and Martin Stone) (549 days)
- Shortest reign: Alex Shane and Ulf Herman (1 day)
- Oldest champion: Robbie Brookside (40 years, 4 months)

The Frontier Wrestling Alliance (FWA) Tag Team Championship was a professional wrestling championship contested for in the British Frontier Wrestling Alliance promotion. The title was only contestable by male tag teams and in tag team matches. Being a professional wrestling championship, it was not won legitimately; it was instead won via a scripted ending to a match or awarded to a wrestler because of a storyline. The title was active between March 2000 and December 2006, just before the company folded in March 2007.

The championship has been known as:

- FWA Tag Team Championship (March 2000 – October 2002)
- FWA British Tag Team Championship (October 2002 – December 2006)

== History ==
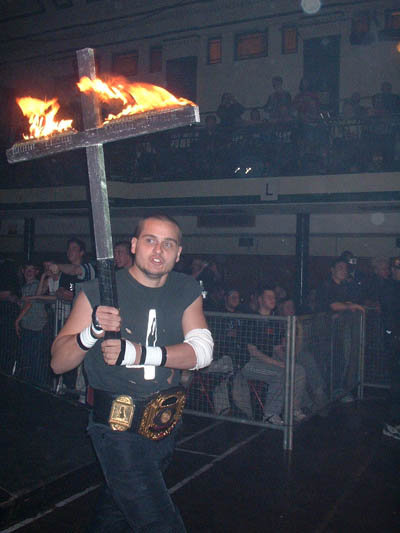
Family member Paul Travell wearing the Tag Team Championship belt.

After the promotion's national expansion in 1999, there was some interest in tag team matches including large-teamed elimination tag team matches as well as traditional two-on-two contests. At March 2000's Urban Legends a two-round tournament was held to inaugurate the FWA Tag Team Championship with The New Breed (Ashe and Curve) defeating Jorge Castano and Scottie Rock in the finals. The final champions, Stixx & Stone (Stixx and Martin Stone), defended their titles less regularly than previous champions resulting in them being stripped of their titles. Before new champions could be crowned, the FWA lost in an interpromotional rivalry with International Pro Wrestling: United Kingdom (IPW:UK) and had to close as a result. FWA's spiritual successor, XWA, originally promised to revive the Tag Team Championship but presently the belts remain inactive.

As well as being the first champions, The New Breed were also the first team to win the belt twice while member Ashe would later join The Family, a large faction that defended the title under the Freebird Rule which allowed any two members to defend the belts. The Family won the titles more than any other team with three wins, giving Ashe, who also won the championship twice with The New Breed, a total of five reigns individually. The Family, in their rivalry with Alex Shane and Ulf Herman, had a number of matches where the championship was contested under a variety of hardcore rules.

=== Tournament ===
The tournament brackets at Urban Legends were:

Semi-finals
Jorge Castano and Scottie Rock	Pin
Mark Sloan and Paul Travell
The New Breed	CO
Alex Shane and Guy Thunder

Final
The New Breed	Pin
Jorge Castano and Scottie Rock

== Title history ==
No.	Wrestlers	Reign	Date	Days held	Location	Event	Notes	Ref.
1	The New Breed (Ashe and Curve)	1	March 24, 2000	421	Barking, Essex	Urban Legends	Defeated Jorge Castano and Scottie Rock in a tournament final	
2	La Familia (Jorge Castano and Alex Castano)	1	May 19, 2001	105	Portsmouth, Hampshire	High Potential		
3	The New Breed (Ashe and Curve)	2	September 1, 2001	153	Harrow, London	Trick or Treat		
4	Drew McDonald and Ulf Herman	1	February 1, 2002	49	Broxbourne, Hertfordshire	Crunch		
-	Vacant	1	March 22, 2002	0	Walthamstow, London	Urban Legends	Vacated when Ulf Herman no-shows an event	
5	UK Pitbulls (Big Dave and Bulk)	1	March 22, 2002	217	Walthamstow, London	Urban Legends	Defeated beat Chris Justice and James Tighe, The Duke of Danger and Kruiz, Hade Vansen and Nikita, La Familia (Jorge Castano and Alex Castano) and The New Breed (Ashe and Curve) in a Gauntlet Match	
6	Alex Shane and Ulf Herman (2)	1	October 25, 2002	142	Walthamstow, London	London Calling		
7	The Family (Paul Travell, Raj Ghosh, Scott Parker, Brandon Thomas, Ashe (3), and Ian DaCyple)	1	March 16, 2003	42	Broxbourne, Hertfordshire	Crunch	Paul Travell and Scott Parker defeated Shane and Herman; The Family defends the title under The Freebird Rule	
8	Alex Shane and Ulf Herman (3)	2	April 27, 2003	1	Portsmouth, Hampshire	Live event		
9	The Family (Paul Travell, Raj Ghosh, Scott Parker, Brandon Thomas, Ashe (4), and Ian DaCyple)	2	April 28, 2003	97	Newport, Wales	Live event		
10	Alex Shane (3) and Stevie Knight	1	August 2, 2003	2	Morecambe, Lancashire	Live event		
11	The Family (Paul Travell, Raj Ghosh, Scott Parker, Brandon Thomas, Ashe (5), and Ian DaCyple)	3	August 4, 2003	356	Cleethorpes, Lincolnshire	Live event		
12	Hampton Court (Duke of Danger and Andy Simmons)	1	July 25, 2004	328	Broxbourne, Hertfordshire	Vendetta		
13	Stixx & Stone (Stixx and Martin Stone)	1	June 18, 2005	549	Morecambe, Lancashire	NOAH Limits		
-	Vacant	2	December 19, 2006	0	Worcester, Worcestershire	FWA Live in Worcester	Vacated when Stone is unable to make a mandatory title defence	

== See also ==
- Professional wrestling in the United Kingdom
- British Open Tag Team Championship
- British Heavyweight Championship (XWA)
