= IPW:UK World Championship =

Professional wrestling world championship

Details
- Promotion: International Pro Wrestling: United Kingdom
- Date established: 16 July 2005
- Date retired: 24 September 2017

Other names
- IPW:UK Championship (2005–2009); IPW:UK British Heavyweight Championship (2009–2012); IPW:UK World Championship (2012–2017)
Statistics
- First champion: Aviv Maayan
- Final champion: Jonny Storm
- Most reigns: Martin Stone (3 times)
- Longest reign: Sha Samuels (937 days)
- Shortest reign: Aviv Maayan (1 day)

The IPW:UK World Championship was a professional wrestling world championship created and promoted by the English professional wrestling promotion, International Pro Wrestling: United Kingdom.

The championship was originally established on July 16, 2005 as the IPW:UK Championship and Aviv Maayan was the inaugural champion. Maayan defeated Martin Stone and Steve Douglas in a three-way match to become the inaugural champion.

On 13 September 2009; reigning All-England Championship Leroy Kincaide defeated reigning IPW:UK Champion Alex Shane unifying both championships. The title was renamed the IPW:UK British Championship.

In August 2012; then IPW:UK booker Andy Quildan left the company thus Revolution Pro Wrestling (RPW or RevPro) was founded. Quidlan recognised a number of titles and champions he had been working with in IPW:UK, including the British Heavyweight Championship, thus creating RPW British Heavyweight Championship. Shortly after, the IPW:UK British Heavyweight Championship became the IPW:UK World Championship. Sha Samuels continued to be recognized as IPW:UK World Champion and RevPro continued to recognize him as their British Heavyweight Champions.

On 24 September 2017, all IPW:UK Championships were vacated and retired.

== Title history ==
=== Names ===
Name	Time of use
IPW:UK Championship	16 July 2005 – 13 September 2009
IPW:UK British Heavyweight Championship	13 September 2009 – 15 May 2011
IPW:UK World Championship	15 May 2011 – 24 September 2017

=== Reigns ===
No.	Order in reign history
Reign	The reign number for the specific set of wrestlers listed
Event	The event promoted by the respective promotion in which the titles were won
—	Used for vacated reigns so as not to count it as an official reign
<1	Indicates reigns was less than a day

No.	Champion	Date	Event	Location	Days held	Reign	Notes	Ref.
1	Aviv Maayan	16 July 2005	Weekend of Champions: Night 1	Orpington, Greater London, England	1	1	Maayan won a #1 contenders battle royal prior to the main event to make it a Three-Way match.	
2	Martin Stone	17 July 2005	Weekend of Champions: Night 2	Orpington, Greater London, England	462	1		
3	Andy Boy Simmonz	22 October 2006	Extreme Measures 3	Orpington, Greater London, England	210	1	This was a Falls Count Anywhere match.	
4	JC Thunder	20 May 2007	Royale Rewards 2007	Orpington, Greater London, England	126	1		
5	Andy Boy Simmonz	23 September 2007	Third Anniversary Weekender: Night Two	Orpington, Greater London, England	175	2	This was a Submission match.	
6	Martin Stone	16 March 2008	Battle Royale: The Last Orpington Stand	Orpington, Greater London, England	189	2	This was a Last Man Standing match.	
7	Iestyn Rees	21 September 2008	Fourth Anniversary Tour: Bromley	Bromley, Greater London, England	209	1		
8	Alex Shane	18 April 2009	Iron Fist	Swanley, Kent, England	148	1	This was an Iron Fish match.	
9	Leroy Kincaide	13 September 2009	Fifth Anniversary Show	Sittingbourne, Kent, England	161	1	This was also an All-England Championship match. Kincaide unified both titles and becomes the Undisputed British Champion.	
10	Dave Mastiff	21 February 2010	No Escape 2010	Sittingbourne, Kent, England	448	1		
11	Sha Samuels	15 May 2011	Sittingbourne Spectacular 2011	Sittingbourne, Kent, England	937	1	This was a Three-Way Elimination match which also included Takeshi Morishima. In August 2012; then IPW:UK booker Andy Quildan left the company, founding Revolution Pro Wrestling. Quidlan took a number of titles with him including the British Heavyweight Championship thus creating RPW British Heavyweight Championship. The IPW:UK British Heavyweight Championship became the IPW:UK World Championship.	
12	Paul Robinson	7 December 2013	Title Showdown 2013: Evening Show	Swanley, Kent, England	169	1		
13	Bad Bones	25 May 2014	Royale Rewards 2014	Tonbridge, Kent, England	154	1		
14	Martin Stone	26 October 2014	Last Man Standing 2014	Tonbridge, Kent, England	41	3		
15	John Klinger	26 December 2014	A Taste of IPW: Germany	Oberhausen, North Rhine-Westphalia, Germany	246	2		
16	Jimmy Havoc	9 August 2015	Summer Bonus 2015	Tonbridge, Kent, England	770	1	This was a Tables, Ladders, and Chairs match which was also for the All-England Championship. Between May 1 and August 21, 2016; Joseph Conners defended the title as an interim World Champion while Havoc was injured.	
17	Jonny Storm	17 September 2017	SuperShow 11: Havoc vs. Noir	Rochester, Kent, England	24	1	This was Storm's Royale Reward contract cash-in turning the match into three-way match. It also included Cara Noir.	
The title was declared vacant and retired on 24 September 2017.

== Combined reigns ==
Rank	Champion	No. of reigns	Combined days
1	Sha Samuels	1	937
2	Jimmy Havoc	1	770
3	Martin Stone	3	692
4	Dave Mastiff	1	448
5	Bad Bones	2	400
6	Andy Boy Simmonz	2	385
7	Iestyn Rees	1	209
8	Paul Robinson	1	169
9	Leroy Kincaide	1	161
10	Alex Shane	1	148
11	JC Thunder	1	126
12	Jonny Storm	1	24
13	Aviv Maayan	1	1

== See also ==
- IPW:UK Tag Team Championship
- IPW:UK Women's Championship
