= Jonny Storm =

British professional wrestler

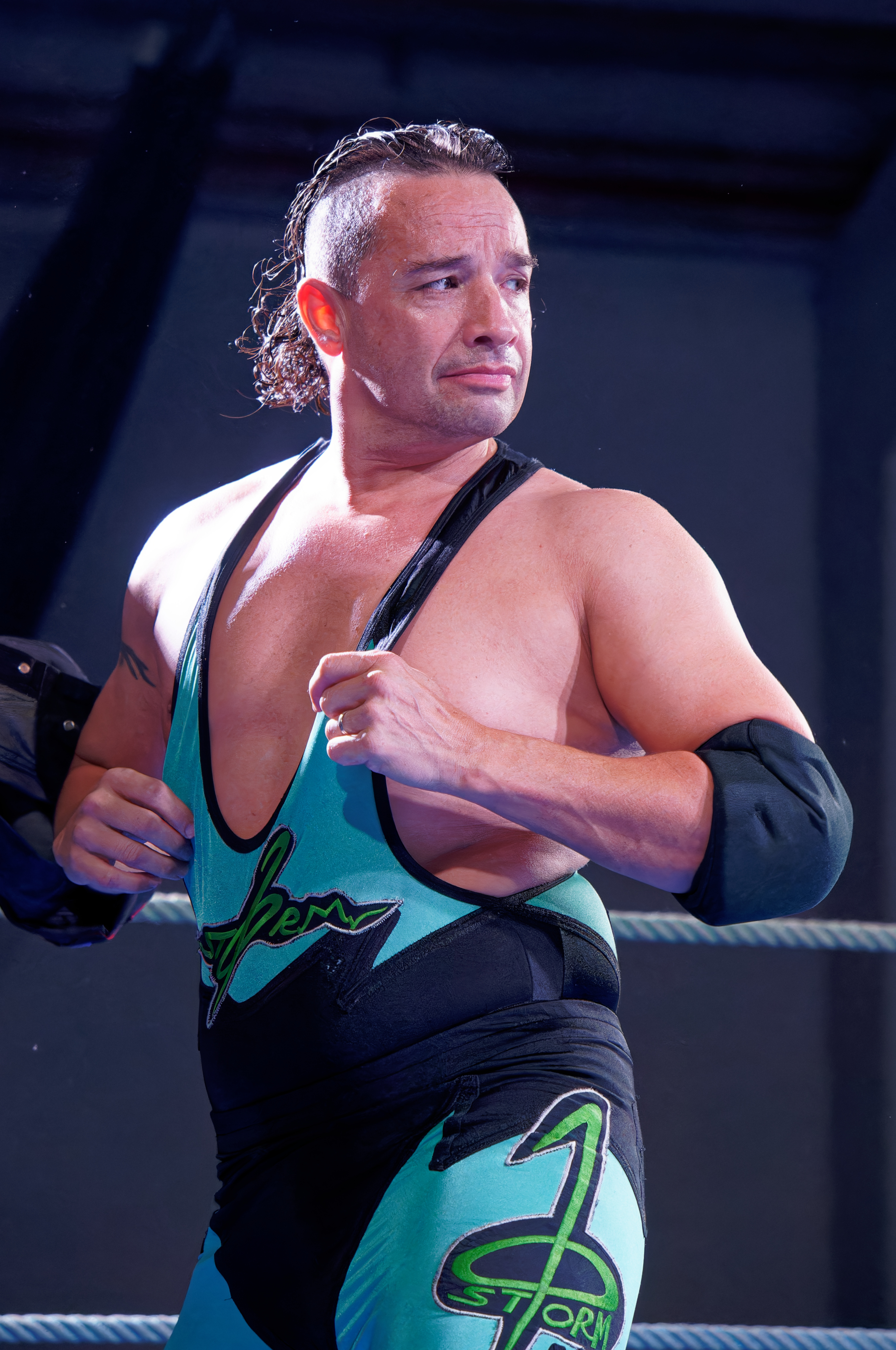
- Storm in 2023

Personal information
- Born: Jonathan Whitcombe; 19 April 1977 (age 49) Harlow, Essex, England

Professional wrestling career
- Ring name: "Wonderkid" Jonny Storm
- Billed height: 5 ft 5 in (1.65 m)
- Billed weight: 176 lb (80 kg; 12.6 st)
- Billed from: Harlow, Essex
- Trained by: Dino Scarlo
- Debut: 1997

Jonathan Whitcombe (born 19 April 1977) is an English professional wrestler, better known by his ring name Jonny Storm. He has worked for many independent promotions across the United Kingdom, including the Frontier Wrestling Alliance, Real Quality Wrestling and One Pro Wrestling. He has also worked in the United States, for promotions such as Ring of Honor, Pro Wrestling Guerrilla, Combat Zone Wrestling, and Total Nonstop Action Wrestling, as well as working in Japan.

== Professional wrestling career ==
=== British and other European promotions ===
At the start of his career, Storm became a mainstay in the Frontier Wrestling Alliance (FWA). He also competed for All-Star Wrestling. Storm began wrestling for Irish Whip Wrestling in March 2005, where he had a series of matches against M-Dogg 20. Storm was one of the trainers for ITV's Celebrity Wrestling in 2005. Although the show was considered a failure, Storm enjoyed it and said it was "a really good experience". Storm has wrestled for numerous other European promotions, including German Stampede Wrestling, Real Quality Wrestling, Rings of Europe and Dutch Championship Wrestling. Also in 2005, he won the Féderation Francophone de Catch promotion's top championship, which he has held since.

One of Storm's most enduring feuds has been with his real-life best friend Jody Fleisch, with whom he has wrestled against in American and British promotions. He has also wrestled regularly for One Pro Wrestling, where, with Fleisch, he was the one half of the first 1PW Tag Team Champions, after they defeated A.J. Styles and Christopher Daniels in a tournament final on 27 May 2006. On 1 January 2007, he won the Athletik Club Wrestling Wrestling Challenge Championship from Toby Nathland, but Nathland defeated him to win it back on 15 December 2007. On 23 March 2007, Storm defeated Maddog Maxx to win the Celtic Wrestling Heavyweight Championship, but he lost it to Maxx in July of that year.

In 2015, Storm began appearing for Insane Championship Wrestling. In 2019, he lost to Kieran Kelly at ICW I Ain't Yer Pal, Dickface! and challenged for the ICW Tag Team Championships. Storm runs his own wrestling holiday camp events between 6 and 12 times a week during summer, Easter and Christmas Holidays. Meanwhile, in the FWA he is currently part of the Flyweight Title Round Robin Tournament, having gained entry into the tournament thanks to another wrestler suffering an injury. He was involved in a bitter feud with Rockstar Spud, an obnoxious flyweight who believed he is the new "Wonderkid" of British wrestling.

=== American promotions ===
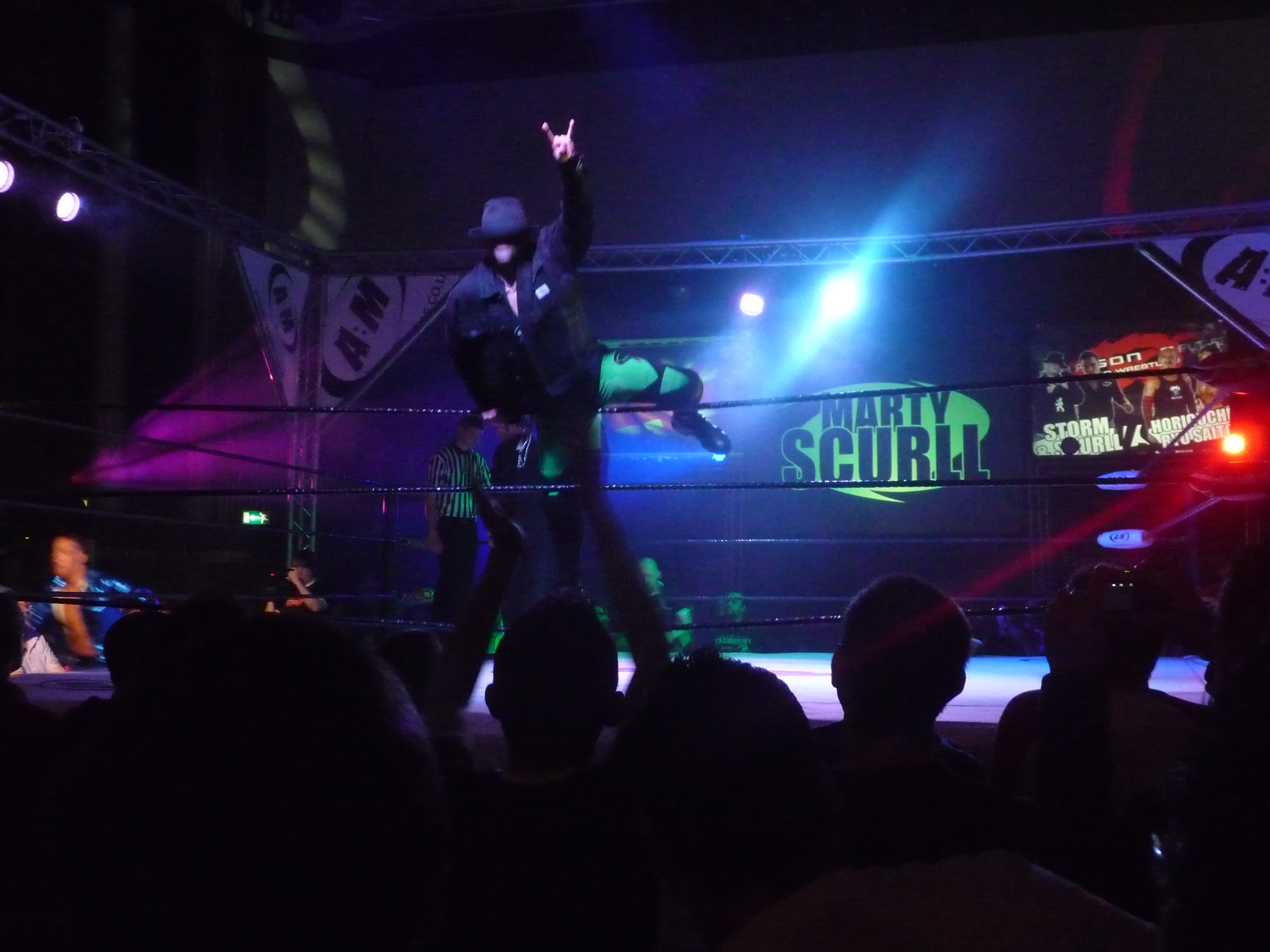
Storm making his ring entrance

Storm competed in Xtreme Pro Wrestling (XPW), and was in the tournament to decide the first XPW European Champion, which was created in 2003 through a working relationship between XPW and the FWA. He won the tournament and the championship by defeating Jerry Lynn in the finals at a FWA show in England. Storm made his first appearance for Total Nonstop Action Wrestling (TNA) on 12 March 2003, by competing in a triple threat match for TNA X Division Championship match, against the champion Kid Kash and Amazing Red, in which Kash retained. In May 2003, Storm competed in a cross-promotional show between Ring of Honor and FWA, entitled ROH/FWA Frontiers of Honor, where he lost to A.J. Styles. In September 2003, Storm competed as a member of Team UK during the TNA 2003 Super X Cup Tournament, losing to Teddy Hart in the first round. At the Combat Zone Wrestling (CZW) show, Respect, on 23 August 2003, Storm challenged Sonjay Dutt for the IWA Mid-South Light Heavyweight Championship, but was unsuccessful. He made further appearance for CZW in January 2004. He returned to the States in 2005, wrestling against Petey Williams and Kevin Steen for Pro Wrestling Guerrilla, and against Trik Davis for Independent Wrestling Association Mid-South. He was supposed to be a member of Team UK in the TNA 2006 World X Cup Tournament, however, two of the other members of the team, Nigel McGuinness and Doug Williams were already booked in Japan, and so they were replaced by Team Canada.

Overall Storm worked for more than 80 promotions across the world, working in 16 different countries.

=== Trainer ===
Storm has also trained other wrestlers, most notably Erin Marshall.

== Championships and accomplishments ==
- All Star Wrestling
  - ASW People's Championship (1 time)
- Alternative Wrestling World
  - AWW British Heavyweight Championship (2 times)
- ABC Pro Wrestling : Thailand
  - ABC Tag Team Championship (2 time, current, inaugural) - with Ronin Rider (1), Matthew Ford (1)
- Super Pro Wrestling
  - SPW Ian Cotter Memorial Championship (1 time)
- Heart and Essex Wrestling
  - HEW British Championship (1 time)
- Athletik Club Wrestling
  - ACW Cruiserweight Championship (5 times)
  - ACW German Championship (1 time)
  - ACW Wrestling Challenge Championship (1 time)
  - ACW Tag Team Championship (4 time) - with Jody Fleisch (2) and Jonas Weber (2)
- Kreative Alternative Professional Organised Wrestling
  - KAPOW All Nations Championship (1 time, current)
- Genesis Professional Wrestling
  - Genesis Tag Team Championship (1 time) – with Keef Chaos
- Best of British Wrestling
  - BOBW Heavyweight Championship (1 time)
- House of Pain Wrestling
  - HOP Heavyweight Championship (1 time, inaugural)
  - HOP Heavyweight Title Tournament (2009)
- Celtic Wrestling
  - CW Heavyweight Championship (1 time)
- Championship Xtreme Wrestling
  - CXW World Championship (1 time)
- Combat Zone Wrestling
  - CZW Match of the Year (2002) - vs. Jody Fleisch
- Falling Starr Wrestling
  - FSW Limitless Championship (1 time)
- Féderation Francophone de Catch
  - 2FC Championship (1 time, inaugural, final)
  - 2FC Title Tournament (2008)
- Frontier Wrestling Alliance / XWA
  - British Heavyweight Championship (1 time)
  - FWA All England Championship (2 times)
  - FWA Gold Rush Fifteen Man #1 Contender Battle Royal (2005, 2007)
  - British Inter-Federation Cup (2006)
- Future Championship Wrestling
  - FCW Heavyweight Championship (1 time)
- Global Wrestling Force
  - GWF Heavyweight Championship (1 time, inaugural)
  - GWF Heavyweight Title Tournament (2002)
- International Catch Wrestling Alliance
  - ICWA Cruiserweight Championship (1 time)
  - ICWA World Junior Heavyweight Championship (1 time)
- Turkish Power Wrestling
  - TPW Championship (1 time)
- International Pro Wrestling: United Kingdom
  - IPW:UK World Championship (1 time)
  - IPW:UK Tag Team Championship (1 time) - with Andreas Corr
  - Extreme Measures Tournament (2004)
- International Wrestling Association: Switzerland
  - IWA Switzerland Light Heavyweight Championship (1 time)
  - IWA Switzerland Cruiserweight Championship (1 time, inaugural, final)
  - IWA Switzerland Cruiserweight Championship Tournament (2005)
- Ligaunabhängig
  - Dragonhearts Championship (1 time)
- Nitro Pro Wrestling Alliance
  - NPWA Tag Team Championship (1 time) - with Gary Wild
- One Pro Wrestling
  - 1PW Tag Team Championship (1 time, inaugural) - with Jody Fleisch
  - 1PW Tag Team Title Tournament (2006)– with Jody Fleisch
- Playhouse Wrestlefest
  - Wrestlefest Tag Team Championship (1 time) - with Jody Fleisch
- Plex Wrestling
  - Plex-ceed Championship (1 time)
  - Plex Wrestling British Championship (1 time)
  - UIWA Heavyweight Championship (1 time)
- Premier Promotions
  - PWF Lightweight Championship (3 times)
  - One Night Tournament (2009)
  - Rumblemania Trophy (2008)
- Rings of Europe
  - RoE King of Europe Championship (1 time)
- Scottish School Of Wrestling
  - SSW Hardcore Championship (1 time)
- SLAM Wrestling
  - SLAM Championship (1 time, inaugural)
  - SLAM Title Tournament (2008)
- Charity Appeal Wrestling Shows
  - CAWS Light Heavyweight Championship (1 time)
- Sliced Bread Wrestling
  - SBW The Golden Toaster (2011)
- Solent Wrestling Federation
  - SWF Heavyweight Championship (1 time)
- The Wrestling Alliance
  - TWA British Commonwealth Championship (2 times)
  - TWA British Welterweight Championship (2 times)
- United Kingdom Pro Wrestling
  - UKPW Inter-Regional Championship (1 time)
- Vertigo Pro Wrestling
  - VPW Heavyweight Championship (1 time)
- Westside Xtreme Wrestling
  - wXw World Lightweight Championship (1 time)
- World Association of Wrestling
  - WAW British Lightweight Championship (2 times)
  - WAW Open Light Heavyweight Championship (2 time)
- World Stars of Wrestling
  - WSW Tag Team Championship (1 time) – with Jody Fleisch
- Xtreme Pro Wrestling
  - XPW European Championship (1 time)
- Real Deal Wrestling
  - RDW Tag Team Championship (1 time) – with Reese Ryan
- British Titles
  - British Middleweight Championship (1 time)
