= Frontier Wrestling Alliance =

British professional wrestling promotion

- Frontier Wrestling Alliance's logo
- Acronym: FWA
- Founded: 1999
- Defunct: 2012
- Style: Professional wrestling Sports entertainment
- Headquarters: London, England
- Founder: Mark Sloan (Founder of Fratton Wrestling Association)
- Owner(s): Mark Sloan (1993–1999); Mark Sloan & Elisar Cabrera (1999–2004); Tony Simpson (Managing Director 2009–)
- Formerly: Fratton Wrestling Association (1993–1999)
- Successor: XWA

Frontier Wrestling Alliance (FWA) was a professional wrestling promotion in Britain. Established in 1993 as the Fratton Wrestling Association it soon became the Frontier Wrestling Alliance six years later and until 2007 when it lost a scripted inter-promotional feud with International Pro Wrestling: United Kingdom. As a result of losing the promotion was forced to close and the company XWA was founded, largely based on the old FWA with some old staff and wrestlers as well as some championships. However, in 2009 the FWA brand was relaunched again as a separate promotion to the XWA, running for three more years before folding again in 2012.

== History ==
=== First run ===
Frontier Wrestling Alliance logo

The FWA initially started out as the Fratton Wrestling Association in 1993 by Mark Sloan in an attempt to create a forum for serious wrestling training and performance based in Portsmouth. Renaming the promotion to the Fratton Wrestling Alliance 1999, it experienced a renovation that geared it towards national expansion and promoted its first show in February of that year, changing to Frontier Wrestling Alliance by the second show in June. The promotion (now being co-run by Mark Sloan and film and TV producer Elisar Cabrera) soon produced a regional television programme ("Frontier Wrestling") in Portsmouth as well as founding a training academy to create its own talent. The emphasis on new wrestlers organically led to an early storyline of new, internationally influenced wrestling clashing with traditional British wrestling with some veterans brought in to help promote FWA's own performers.

The company created a British championship later that year and in 2000 also crowned tag team champions as it continued to expand, performing across the south of the country. By August FWA began promoting shows with foreign talent, initially Sabu and Dan Severn, which it would continue to do so during its first run by cross promoting with other promotions. This eventually led to the British Heavyweight Championship being won by American wrestler Christopher Daniels, the belt being defended on international soil and a joint-promoted event with American independent promotion Ring of Honor in 2003. The company used international stars to gain notoriety (including hosting the XPW European Championship) and were further aided in advertisement when Alex Shane became a regular presenter on national talk radio station Talksport, aiding the company's expansion into the north of England. The ties with Talksport became important when FWA promoted a show entitled "Revival" from the Crystal Palace Indoor Arena that was broadcast live on radio and later on national television, through Bravo.

FWA logo used during its final years

In late 2006, FWA entered into a scripted feud with International Pro Wrestling: United Kingdom (IPW:UK) when FWA wrestlers invaded IPW:UK's annual Brawl at the Hall event and took some of the locker room hostage. In the elimination tag team contest, Team FWA beat Team IPW:UK and proclaimed war on the company. As the rivalry intensified over the next few months, wrestlers from both rosters had matches in both promotions and neutral ground with FWA gaining the early advantage. After months of clashes three events were held under joint banners with the final show, IPW:UK vs. FWA: Final Frontiers, booked for a match between IPW's Martin Stone and an unnamed FWA wrestler to with both companies' future on the line. The show featured much in-fighting, including the two commentators breaking out into a brawl and ended with the mystery FWA wrestler being revealed as the retired former FWA British Heavyweight Champion Flash Barker who lost the match, resulting in FWA folding in March 2007.

=== Closure and XWA ===
After the FWA went out of business, Greg Lambert and Mark Kay held a press conference and formed a new promotion named XWA alluding to their former company but insisting the two had a different ethos, with the new company gearing its product towards family entertainment rather than being adult orientated. Despite only basing their promotion on the former company, XWA inherited the physical British Heavyweight and Flyweight Championship belts from FWA and continued to use them, promising to also resurrect the FWA Tag Team Championship, though they never would. However, in April 2009 at XWA's War on the Shore V, Lambert finally announced the creation of XWA's own British Heavyweight Championship belts and gave the FWA belt to Alex Shane, making his only appearance at an XWA event, while Shane presented the new physical title to the winner of the evening's championship match, Sam Slam.

=== Rebirth ===
Despite being on the losing end of the battle with International Pro Wrestling: United Kingdom and the XWA promotion purportedly taking its lineage, in May 2009, over two years after its original demise, Tony Simpson and Alex Shane announced their intention to revive the national promotion. They held their comeback show, New Frontiers, in early August with matches designed to crown a new FWA World Champion and FWA Flyweight Champion. On 13 February 2010 at the British Uproar event in Broxbourne, Martin Stone defeated Andy Simmonz in the tournament finals to become the first FWA World Heavyweight Champion. He subsequently turned heel and formed a faction called "The Agenda", whose aims are to decimate the UK's top talent in order to showcase their skills to the large American wrestling companies and earn a lucrative contract as a result. At the European Uprising show in Birmingham on 20 November 2010, Alex Shane turned heel and revealed it was he who was the real leader of the Agenda.

After April 2012, the company quietly went inactive again running no further events, and their website shutting down.

== Rules ==
The promotion followed the same rules as seen in most of professional wrestling but adopted the penalty card system from football, with the yellow card serving as a warning, and any red card offence resulting in disqualification. Piledrivers were banned under FWA rules and could result in a fine as well as disqualification.

== Notable wrestlers ==
- Alex Shane
- Zack Sabre Jr.
- Marty Scurll
- Andrew Simmonz
- Jonny Storm
- El Ligero
- Jody Fleisch
- Sha Samuels
- Terry Frazier
- Mark Haskins
- Rockstar Spud
- Bubblegum
- Drew Galloway
- Jorge Castano
- CM Punk
- Steve Corino
- AJ Styles
- Nikita

== Championships ==
=== Championships in other companies ===
Championship	Last FWA Champion	Date won	Current champion	Current promotion
British Heavyweight Championship	Robbie Brookside	15 July 2006	Spud	XWA
British Flyweight Championship	Ross Jordan	10 December 2006	Spud	XWA
All England Championship	Sam Slam	25 March 2007	Leroy Kincaide	International Pro Wrestling: United Kingdom

=== Defunct championships ===
Championship	Date created	First champion(s)	Date retired	Last champion(s)
FWA World Heavyweight Championship	13 February 2010	Martin Stone	1 April 2012	Martin Stone
FWA Flyweight Championship	30 July 2005	Ross Jordan	28 July 2012	Jynkz
FWA European Union Championship	2000	Stuart "Fury" Farrimond	9 July 2001	Scottie Rock
XPW European Championship	16 March 2003	Christopher Annino (Rescue 911)	28 November 2004	Jonny Storm
FWA Tag Team Championship	24 March 2000	The New Breed (Ashe and Curve)	20 October 2006	Stixx and Stone (Stixx and Martin Stone)
FWA Academy Championship	28 June 2003	James Tighe	27 January 2007	LT Summers
FWA Academy Tag Team Championship	25 November 2005	Mark Sloan & Ollie Burns	27 January 2007	Mark Sloan & Ollie Burns

=== Defunct accomplishments ===
Accomplishment	Latest winner	Date won	Notes
Gold Rush	Jonny Storm	3 February 2007	Now competed for in XWA
King of England	Jody Fleisch	9 February 2002	One-off tournament
Round Robin tournament	Jody Fleisch	31 July 2005	
