= James Tighe =

English professional wrestler

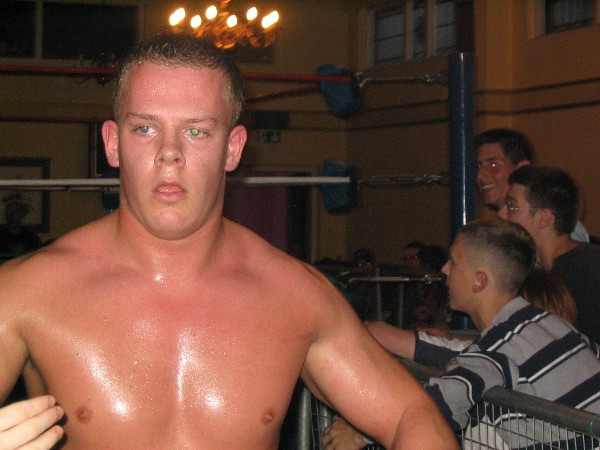
- Tighe in 2004

Personal information
- Born: 27 March 1982 (age 44) Chichester, West Sussex, England

Professional wrestling career
- Ring name: James Tighe
- Billed height: 5 ft 8 in (1.73 m)
- Billed weight: 220 lb (100 kg)
- Billed from: Portsmouth, Hampshire
- Trained by: Mark Sloan; Frontier Wrestling Alliance
- Debut: 28 October 2000

James Tighe (born 27 March 1982) is a semi-retired English professional wrestler. He is best known for his work with Frontier Wrestling Alliance. He currently competes around the United Kingdom.

== Professional wrestling career ==
In the FWA, Tighe was always billed as the 'first son' of the FWA Academy, having been the first wrestler to graduate. He won a tournament to become the first FWA Academy champion, beating Eamon Shrahan. Shrahan would beat Tighe a few months later to become the champion.

In the latter half of 2004, Tighe was engaged in a brief feud with AJ Styles. Tighe defeated Styles at FWA Vendetta 2004 by disqualification, only to be defeated in turn at FWA British Uprising III in a 30-min Iron Man Match.

James Tighe also appeared on International Showdown in March 2005, teaming with then GHC Tag Team Champions Doug Williams and Scorpio to win a 6-man tag team match against Tiger Emperor, Mitsuharu Misawa and Yoshinari Ogawa.

In February 2010, Tighe competed in a 2-falls-to-a-finish match which consisted of 6 5-minute rounds against Joel Redman for the Devon Wrestling Association in Teignmouth, UK. He lost by two falls to one, by disqualification when Redman had the referee believe that Tighe had used a steel chair.

Tighe also played a part in training current WWE and former TNA, ICW, PWG and EVOLVE wrestler Drew Galloway.

== Return to regular in ring action ==
Since Tighe semi-retired from professional wrestling in 2010 with his last recorded match being against Joel Redman for International Pro Wrestling:UK. 4 years later Tighe wrestled for Revolution Pro Wrestling twice in 2014.

In 2017, James Tighe returned to semi-regular action reuniting with former Tag Team partner Andy Boy Simmonz as the 'Iron Lions'. They suffered a loss against the team of Buff Daddy Johnny Rock-it and TIMO in December 2017 at Revolution Pro Wrestling. At the RevPro: Revolution Rumble event in January 2018, The Iron Lions defeated Eddie Kenway and Ace Grace. 4 months later in April 2018, The Iron Lions lost to the team of Kurtis Chapman and Dan Randall. At the RevPro Contenders 18 event in June 2018, The Iron Lions defeated Kelly Sixx and Joshua James. On Sunday 22 July 2018 James Tighe and Andy Simmonz returned to IPW.UK for the first time in almost 10 years to take on Jody Fleisch and Jonny Storm. Following on from this, James Tighe and Andy Simmonz will team up on Saturday 3 August to take on Harry Milligan and Dan Randall for Revolution Pro Wrestling.

== Championships and accomplishments ==
- FWA Academy
  - FWA Academy Championship (1 time)
  - ICW Tag Team Championship (1 time) – with Andy Boy Simmonz
- Pro Wrestling Illustrated
  - PWI ranked James Tighe # 237 of the 500 best singles wrestlers of the PWI 500 in 2004
- Ultimate Championship Wrestling
  - UCW Heavyweight Championship (1 time)
- Wrestle Zone Wrestling
  - WZW Interpromotional Championship (1 time)
- Italian Championship Wrestling
  - ICW Italian Tag Team Championship (1 Time) - with Andy Simmons
- Other titles
  - PWC Championship (2 times)
  - Purple Belt - Dynamics CRM (1 time)
