= Alex Shane =

British professional wrestler

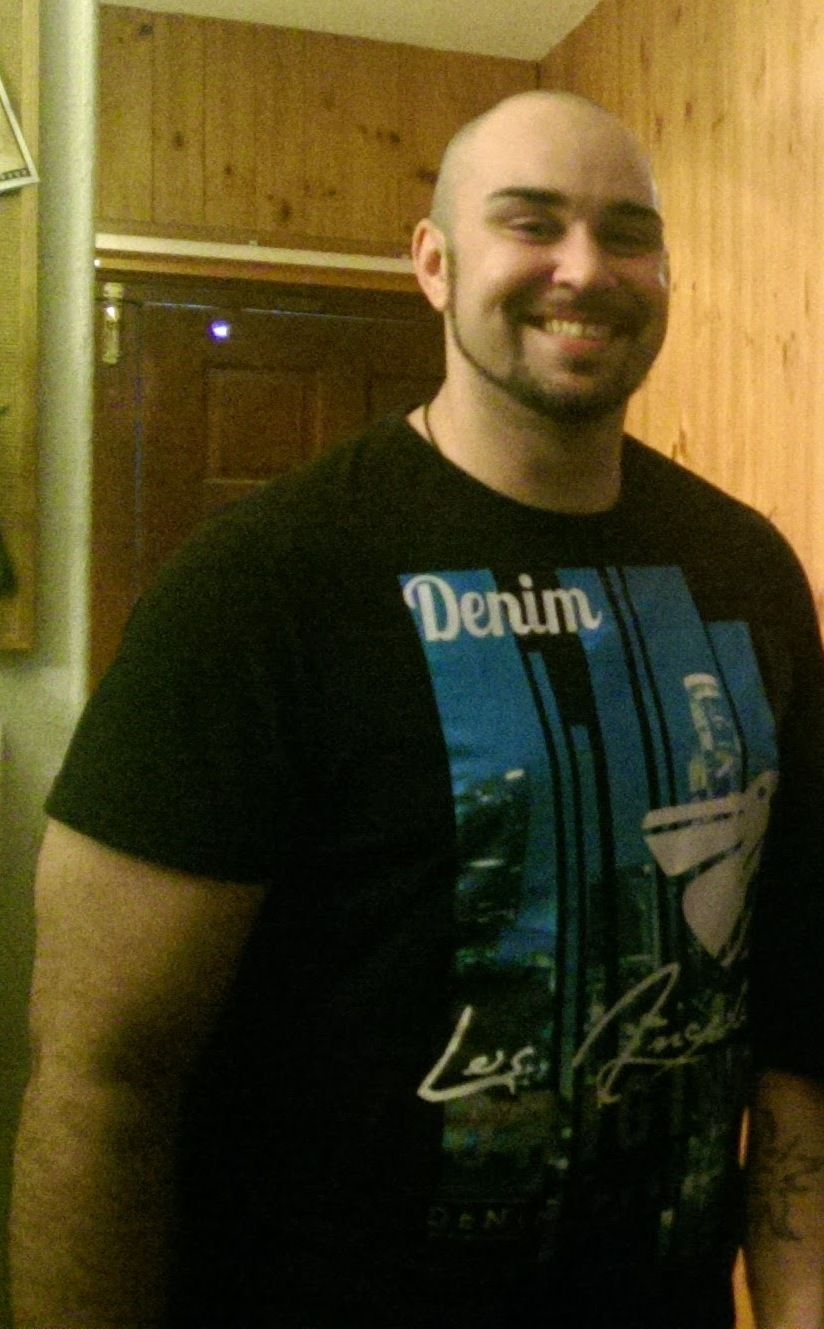
- Shane in July 2014

Personal information
- Born: Alexander Daniel Spilling; 15 November 1979 (age 46) London, England, UK

Professional wrestling career
- Ring name(s): Alex Shane; LX Blade; Robby Rage; The Showstealer
- Billed height: 6 ft 6 in (198 cm)
- Billed weight: 280 lb (127 kg)
- Trained by: Andre Baker; Dino Scarlo
- Debut: 1995
- Retired: 2011

Alexander Daniel Spilling (born 15 November 1979) is a British professional wrestler and professional wrestling commentator who is best known by his ring name "The Showstealer" Alex Shane. Spilling also works as a promoter, wrestling coach and television producer.

== Professional wrestling career ==
=== Early career ===
Alex Spilling began wrestling for the NWA UK Hammerlock promotion in 1995 under the tutelage of owner Andre Baker. After several years with the promotion, Spilling became an assistant trainer under Justin Richards and Doug Williams where he trained many of the Hammerlock roster such as Mad Dog Mcphie, Jonny Storm and Jody Fleisch, among others. Spilling later fell out with Baker and left to work for the brand-new UWA. During his time in the UWA, Spilling formed a tag team with fellow ex-Hammerlock wrestler Guy Thunder and developed much of his in-ring ability and mic skills as well as creating his heel persona, Alex Shane.

=== Frontier Wrestling Alliance ===
In 1999, Alex Shane was taken under the wing of Dino Scarlo and Jody Fleisch. During this time, Shane joined the newly revived Frontier Wrestling Alliance promotion. He worked the company's second show and later became the British Heavyweight Champion.

Shane opened his own wrestling school, Capital City Pro Wrestling. CCPW became the official London home of the FWA, and Shane became further involved in the company by helping to run the first-ever FWA London show in Barking, Essex in 2001. During this time, Shane also made appearances in a newly formed promotion known as Universal Championship Wrestling, it was here Shane was repackaged as LX Blade. The character was abandoned when the promotion folded after just two shows.

While promoting his CCPW venture, Shane appeared as a guest on the Talksport radio show hosted by Tommy Boyd. Shane soon became a regular co-host and helped the show become the UK's first fully fledged national wrestling radio show. During his time on the radio show in 2001, Shane returned to the FWA under his most successful persona "The Showstealer". Alex Shane later replaced Boyd with a brand new show: Wrestle-Talk. Talksport cancelled the show in December 2002 as it felt wrestling was not part of the image they wished to promote.

In October 2002, Shane teamed with Ulf Herman to defeat the UK Pitbulls and win the FWA Tag Team Championship.

=== End of the Showstealer ===
On 6 June "NGW 2nd Anniversary Show", Nathan Cruz faced Alex Shane for the rights of the name "Showstealer". The match was a variant of Last Man Standing, and resulted in Shane losing his nickname to the new "Showstealer", Nathan Cruz.

In 2007, Shane's return to in-ring competition was announced by his facing Martin Stone, but he was forced to withdraw from the match for medical reasons.

=== Promoting ===
Alex Shane would continue his career in wrestling promoting, presenting the International Showdown event at the Coventry Skydome. In its sequel, Universal Uproar, Shane gained a pinfall over three-time WWE champion and 'Hardcore Legend' Mick Foley in an elimination tag-match.

In March 2006, Shane was announced as the new head of European Marketing and promotion for Ring of Honor. In August, he promoted the group's first overseas tour, and it was also the company's biggest grossing weekend. In April 2007, Shane promoted a 16-man tournament called "King of Europe Cup".

In June 2008, Alex promoted a four-day UK tour for TNA, in which he returned to the ring in a surprise one shot deal for the International Pro Wrestling: United Kingdom promotion in South England to face Martin Stone. Billed as his last match before leaving for India, Shane lost to Stone after almost 30 minutes in an exciting contest which left Shane showing no signs of ring rust. At the end of 2008, Shane reportedly signed Indian bodybuilder and TV star Varinder Singh Ghuman to bring him to the UK and train to wrestle. Shane has said in interviews that he plans to use Singh as a spring board to bring wrestling to India.

In early 2009, Shane made a shocking return to IPW:UK, winning the annual "Extreme Measures" tournament. He also won the IPW:UK title from Lestyn Rees on 18 April, although claiming to still be retired.

Shane then went on to work as the creative and promotions director of the new FWA from August 2009 until September 2011. After only 18 months, Shane helped take the company from the Broxbourne Civic Hall to the London Excel Center and the world-famous Birmingham NEC.

In April 2012, Alex worked with Jamie Hadley to present BritWres-Fest 2012 in London for the Great Ormond Street Children's Hospital. Getting nine top UK promotions to work together for one night and presenting a free show to local families, BW-F 2012 was the first nationally televised British wrestling event in 25 years, with bouts airing on Challenge's BWC: British Wrestling Round-Up show which Shane produced.

=== TV producer ===
Alex is the creator and producer of WrestleTalk TV, which ran for seven series on Sky channel Challenge between mid-2012 and early 2016. The show was created by Shane for YouTube, before being signed by TV agency RDA for broadcast on Sky. This would lead to Shane producing BWC British Wrestling Round-Up on Sky (covered above) and game show mini series 'Beat The Beast' featuring ITV game show star Mark 'The Beast' Labbett. Shane also began producing Lucha Libre AAA for worldwide TV and NGW British Wrestling Weekly, currently aired in 36 countries globally under his Trident Vision Media company. The company, known as TVM, also works heavily in producing YouTube content with WrestleTalk TV, the WhatCulture.com wrestling show 'WCPW Loaded'.

=== Commentary ===
Alex Shane was the colour commentator for What Culture Pro Wrestling (WCPW) (later Defiant Pro Wrestling). He favoured the heels during matches, in keeping with his heel persona when he was an active wrestler. He also plays the heel role on AAA Lucha Libre and does a more play-by-play straight commentator role for the NGW British Wrestling Weekly program, which he also produces.

Shane was also the co-host and commentator of ITV's World of Sport Wrestling series (marketed as a reboot of the World of Sport wrestling segment), alongside WWE Hall of Famer Jim Ross. The 2 hours special aired over Christmas 2016 on ITV 1.

When World of Sport Wrestling returned to ITV1 as a series in 2018, Shane continued as commentator, this time alongside SoCal Val and Stu Bennett.

== Publications ==
In April 2009, Shane released his first book "Alex Shane's Guide to Pro Wrestling - Volume One". The book is a collection of his monthly articles in Fighting Spirit Magazine. Shane is the creator and producer of Sky TV show Wrestle Talk TV. Starting as a YouTube series in October 2011, the format was signed to a TV spot on Challenge in August 2012 after appearances from big-name stars such as Hulk Hogan. This success has led to the signing of Shane's second series, BWC: British Wrestling Round-Up in April 2013.

== Championships and accomplishments ==
- British Championship Wrestling
  - BCW Heavyweight Championship (1 time)
- Capital City Pro Wrestling
  - CCPW Championship (1 time)
- Frontier Wrestling Alliance
  - FWA British Heavyweight Championship (2 times)
  - FWA Tag Team Championship (2 times) – with Ulf Herman (1) and Stevie Knight (1)
  - FWA World Heavyweight Championship (1 time)
- FutureShock Wrestling
  - FSW Championship (1 time)
- Grand Pro Wrestling
  - GPW British Heavyweight Championship (1 time)
- International Pro Wrestling: United Kingdom
  - IPW:UK Championship (1 time)
  - Extreme Measures Tournament (2009)
- International Wrestling Promotions
  - IWP Heavyweight Championship (1 time)
- Original Pro Wrestling Organisation
  - OPWO Heavyweight Championship (1 time)
- Rock And Metal Wrestling Action
  - RAMWA Southern Area Championship (1 time)
- The Wrestling Alliance
  - TWA British Heavyweight Championship (1 time)
- World Association of Wrestling
  - WAW British Heavyweight Championship (1 time)
- X Wrestling Alliance
  - XWA British Heavyweight Championship (3 times)
- Other titles
  - IWP North East Heavyweight Championship (1 time)
  - BPW Championship (27 Times)
