= International Pro Wrestling: United Kingdom =

British professional wrestling promotion

- Acronym: IPW:UK
- Founded: September 2004
- Defunct: September 2017
- Style: Professional wrestling Sports entertainment
- Headquarters: Orpington, United Kingdom
- Founder: Daniel Edler
- Owner: Daniel Edler (2004–2017)

International Pro Wrestling: United Kingdom (Sometimes called IPW:UK or IPWUK) was a British professional wrestling promotion, founded by Daniel Edler. The company was established in 2004 and predominantly promoted events across Kent and the south-east; notably in Orpington, Sittingbourne, Tonbridge, Swanley and lastly Rochester.

== History ==
The promotion made its debut in September 2004 with a show called Extreme Measures at the Orpington Halls in Orpington, Greater London. The show included an Iron Fist match between Jonny Storm and Pro Wrestling Guerrilla's Super Dragon. At its inception, the promoter was Daniel Edler and the Booker was Andrew "Fozzy" Maddock.

Other memorable early shows for IPW:UK would include the Best of British series which would see matches to determine the best wrestlers in the UK of a certain class (High Flyers, and Heavyweights).

After initially coming in as a referee in 2005, Andy Quildan was promoted in the company to Booker, replacing Andrew Maddock - with Quildan also taking over the behind the scenes role of lead editor for all media output. The promotion would soon reach a deal with The Wrestling Channel to broadcast a weekly one-hour television show.

In August 2006, Frontier Wrestling Alliance allowed IPW:UK to participate in its second Frontiers of Honor show which also involves American promotion Ring of Honor. This working relationship with FWA would seem to take a turn for the worse when several incidents involving IPW:UK using FWA talent when the same talent were scheduled to appear in FWA events, and promoting FWA title defences without asking for permission from the FWA management team. However, these seemingly legit incidents were worked into an inter-promotional feud that would see then IPW:UK Champion Martin Stone be stripped of his FWA Tag Team Title, siding with IPW:UK in preparation to face semi-retired FWA Star Alex Shane in a Promotion vs. Promotion – Winner Takes All Match at Broxbourne on 16 March 2007. This was later changed to The Orpington Halls vs. Flash Barker, on 25 March - an event which IPW:UK won.

In early-2007, IPW:UK announced that from October 2007 to September 2008, they would be running a year-long, 64 person tournament entitled the "British National Championship". This culminated in a final bout between Johnny Moss and Terry Frazier, with Frazier coming out on top as the winner of the BNC and the new All-England Champion. The promotion tried a second version later down the line, with far less critical success.

On 26 August 2012, at booker Andy Quildan broke with the promotion to ensure "the high standards he set to the promotion" would be maintained. Quildan would bring with him the British Heavyweight, Tag Team and Cruiserweight Championships to his new promotion Revolution Pro Wrestling.

At the same time, Daniel Edler, still recognising all the current champions, began working on "Academy" events set in Swanley, with the aim being to produce the next generation of British talent. A star student would turn out to be WWE wrestler Sam Stoker (aka Kit Wilson, fka Sammy Smooth).

In November 2015 the company began a string of “SuperShow” events at the Casino Rooms Nightclub in Rochester, Kent. These featured famous former WWE and top independent wrestlers, facing off against IPW:UK roster members. There were 11 of these SuperShow events through until September 2017.

In July 2017, owner and founder Daniel Edler sold the company assets and the final ever IPW:UK event was held on 24 September 2017, one day shy of 13 years to the date of the first show.

In 2022 a one-off return show happened in Kent, featuring just four matches.

== Championships ==
IPW:UK promoted four main championships during its time, with the major title, the IPW:UK World Championship being a World championship - after being defended internationally.

=== Retired championships ===
| Championship | Final champion(s) | Date retired | Location | Notes |
|---|---|---|---|---|
| IPW:UK World Championship | Jonny Storm | September 2017 | Swanley, Kent, England | Vacated and retired |
| IPW:UK Tag Team Championship | Sammy Smooth & James Castle | September 2017 | Swanley, Kent, England | Vacated and retired |
| IPW:UK Women's Championship | Livvii Grace | September 2017 | Swanley, Kent, England | Vacated and retired |
| IPW:UK All-England Championship | Earl Black Jr | September 2017 | Swanley, Kent, England | Vacated and retired |

== See also ==
- Professional wrestling in the United Kingdom
- List of professional wrestling promotions in the United Kingdom
