= Leviticus (film) =

2026 film by Adrian Chiarella

- Theatrical release poster
- Directed by: Adrian Chiarella
- Written by: Adrian Chiarella
- Produced by: Samantha Jennings; Kristina Ceyton; Hannah Ngo
- Starring: Joe Bird; Stacy Clausen; Jeremy Blewitt; Mia Wasikowska
- Cinematography: Tyson Perkins
- Edited by: Nick Fenton
- Music by: Jed Kurzel
- Production company: Causeway Films
- Distributed by: Maslow Entertainment
- Release dates: 23 January 2026 (Sundance); 18 June 2026 (Australia)
- Running time: 88 minutes
- Country: Australia
- Language: English
- Budget: $3.5 million
- Box office: $9 million

Leviticus is a 2026 Australian coming-of-age romantic supernatural horror film written and directed by Adrian Chiarella in his feature directorial debut. Starring Joe Bird, Stacy Clausen, Jeremy Blewitt, and Mia Wasikowska (who also serves as an executive producer), the film follows two teenagers who, after being forced to undergo a supernatural conversion therapy ritual, are tormented by a violent entity that shapeshifts into the person they desire most - each other.

The film premiered in the Midnight section of the 2026 Sundance Film Festival on 23 January. It was theatrically released in Australia on 18 June to positive reviews from critics, who praised its premise and performances.

== Plot ==
Following his father's death, Naim Reid and his mother Arlene relocate to a devout evangelical Christian town in Victoria. There, Naim meets and begins a secret romance with local teenager Ryan Whelan. After witnessing Ryan kissing the pastor's son, Hunter, a jealous Naim vengefully outs Ryan and Hunter to the latter's parents.

Hunter's parents enlist a "deliverance healer" to purge the boys of their homosexual desires through a form of gay exorcism. Ryan and Hunter uncontrollably convulse, vomit, and scream in agony throughout the ritual. Naim later attempts to make amends with an increasingly withdrawn Ryan, who rebuffs him. Naim witnesses Ryan talking to empty air, then follows him to a local roller rink, where photo booth pictures are printed of Ryan kissing an invisible figure. Naim opens the curtain to see Ryan being strangled by an unseen force. Ryan escapes and screams at Naim to stay away from him.

Naim seeks out Hunter, and witnesses him being attacked and dragged away by another invisible force. Hunter's severed head is later discovered in a nearby field. Terrified for Ryan's fate, Naim approaches the police, divulging their relationship to a detective and pleading with her to stop the entity. She dismisses him and informs Arlene about his relationship with Ryan.

Hoping to protect Naim from hatred and persecution, Arlene hires the healer to perform the ritual on him. At Hunter's wake, Naim confronts Ryan outside. The two kiss before "Ryan" begins violently attacking Naim. Naim returns to the house and sees Ryan inside, whereupon he realizes he was not being attacked by the real Ryan. Hunter's sister, Izzie, tells them that a girl named Marnie in a nearby town died under mysterious circumstances after she and her girlfriend Jessica were subjected to the ritual.

Naim and Ryan visit Jessica at a hospital. She explains that the entity takes the form of the person its victim desires most, only appears when the victim is alone, and grows stronger over time, and that there is no way to stop it. On the bus ride home, Ryan and Naim kiss, and Ryan gives Naim a handjob.

The entity attacks Ryan in the school bathroom, mutilating his ear. Desperate to protect them both, Naim informs Ryan that he plans to leave town and begs him not to follow. Ryan confesses that if the entity will follow them forever, he does not want it to appear as anyone else but Naim.

Blaming Ryan and Naim for her brother's death and her father's subsequent abandonment of the family, Izzie lures them to an abandoned car park under the pretense of helping them locate the healer. A group of teens who have been bullying Ryan then arrive to assault them. Izzie reveals that Naim was the one who outed Hunter and Ryan. Ryan fights off the attackers and helps Naim escape, before furiously asserting that he never wants to see him again.

While Naim is home alone, the entity attempts to break into the house. Ryan arrives at Naim's back door, seemingly also running from the entity. The two reconcile before "Ryan", actually the entity, breaks through the screen door and attacks Naim. Naim manages to ward off the entity with a lighter. The entity chases him to a derelict mill, which Naim sets ablaze with the entity trapped inside.

When Ryan disappears soon after, Naim fears he may have mistakenly killed the real Ryan. Authorities later confirm that no trace of Ryan was found in the ruins of the mill. Arlene admits that she knew the consequences of the ritual, but insists that she did what was necessary for his survival. Hurt and betrayed, Naim abandons Arlene at a petrol station and heads to a nearby bus stop to leave town. He finds Ryan, who also intends to leave, and the two board the bus together. As it drives away, Naim glimpses the entity outside, suggesting that the fear of being alone will always be nearby. He places his head on Ryan's shoulder, and they travel into the unknown future together.

== Cast ==
- Joe Bird as Naim Reid
- Stacy Clausen as Ryan Whelan
- Mia Wasikowska as Arlene Reid, Naim's mother
- Jeremy Blewitt as Hunter
- Ewen Leslie as Rob, Hunter and Izzie’s father and the town's pastor
- Davida McKenzie as Izzie, Hunter's sister
- Nicholas Hope as the "Deliverance Healer"
- Zahra Newman as Rita, a detective
- Edwina Wren as Jacky, Hunter and Izzie’s mother
- Tyallah Bullock as Marnie, a lifeguard who was killed by the entity
- Shannon Berry as Jessica, Marnie’s girlfriend

== Production ==
Leviticus was developed through VicScreen's Originate initiative under the mentorship of script developer Angeli Macfarlane, with writer and director Adrian Chiarella drawing on his background in film editing and his personal experiences to craft a "queer social horror" inspired by Asian cinema and modern genre classics like It Follows (2014) and The Witch (2015). The project received funding in July 2024 as part of Screen Australia's 2024–25 production slate. It was produced by Australian's Causeway Films, who co-financed the film with Samira Productions. Post production was provided by VicScreen and Kojo Studio.

The title is a reference to the Book of Leviticus, a book of the Bible often cited by religious conservatives as evidence of divine prohibition of homosexuality.

In the post-production phase, Frank Ocean's track "Self Control" was added as the end credits song with his approval shared through a personal letter. This is the first use of his music licensed in a film in a half decade, as the last use was Waves in 2019.

== Release ==
The film had its world premiere on 23 January 2026 at the 2026 Sundance Film Festival in the Midnight section. Shortly after, Neon acquired worldwide distribution rights excluding Australia and New Zealand to the film in a deal worth around US$5 million. The film later had its Australian premiere on 6 June 2026 at the 73rd Sydney Film Festival, where it also played in the Official Competition.

Maslow Entertainment released the film in Australia on 18 June 2026, with Neon releasing the film in the United States the following day.

Leviticus was released on streaming in the US on 28 July 2026. It was released on DVD and Blu-ray on 8 September 2026.

== Reception ==
=== Critical response ===
On the review aggregator website Rotten Tomatoes, 92% of 177 critics' reviews are positive, with an average rating of 7.6/10. The website's consensus reads: "Merging an emotionally-involving queer relationship with its clever monster concept, Leviticus executes its intriguing hook with eerie aplomb." Metacritic, which uses a weighted average, assigned the film a score of 83 out of 100, based on 30 critics, indicating "universal acclaim".

Benjamin Lee of The Guardian wrote that Leviticus is "a haunting and innovative horror film", praising its unsettling blend of genre thrills and tender romance, noting the "genuine chemistry between leads Joe Bird and Stacy Clausen" that helps balance its emotional stakes and supernatural dread. Marshall Shaffer of Slant Magazine similarly described the film as "at times intensely creepy" yet also "a potent and poignant teen romance", emphasizing how the performances of Bird and Clausen fuel both the film's emotional depth and its escalating horror.

Richard Lawson of The Hollywood Reporter wrote that the film "takes a solemn, eerie look at homophobia and repression", grounding its allegorical terror in the relationship between its two central characters. Meagan Navarro of Bloody Disgusting highlighted the cast's contributions, writing that "Leviticus owes much of its success to the tremendous performances by its two leads. Joe Bird and Stacy Clausen deftly navigate all the emotional complexities of coming-of-age in a repressed setting that hits too close to home for any reprieve. While the tenderness beneath Ryan’s machismo endears, it's Naim's bone-deep fear and melancholy that's as heartbreaking as it is compelling."

Alan French of FandomWire singled out Joe Bird's work more directly, noting that, "Bird and Clausen are both excellent in the movie," further adding, "Bird, who first popped in Talk to Me, is particularly impressive. Bird’s performance alone is worth watching, and there are some genuinely incredible moments exploring life in a fundamentalist religious movement." Preston Barta of Dallas Observer wrote, "If Chiarella supplies the film’s aching brain, Joe Bird supplies its heart. The young actor, already a breakout from the horror hit Talk to Me, anchors Leviticus as the boy through whom we experience everything. He understood the assignment instinctively."

=== Accolades ===
Award	Ceremony	Category	Nominee(s)	Result	Ref.
SXSW Film Festival	March 12–18, 2026	Festival Favorites	Leviticus	Nominated	
Sydney Film Festival	June 3–14, 2026	Best Film	Leviticus	Nominated	
Frameline Film Festival	June 17–27, 2026	Outstanding First Narrative Feature Award	Leviticus	Won (Note: Tied with Test)	
Astra Midseason Movie Awards	June 30, 2026	Best Independent Feature	Leviticus	Won	
Fangoria Chainsaw Awards	October 25, 2026	Best Wide Release	Leviticus	Nominated	
Fangoria Chainsaw Awards	October 25, 2026	Best Supporting Performance	Stacy Clausen	Nominated	
Fangoria Chainsaw Awards	October 25, 2026	Editor's Eyeball	Joe Bird	Won	
