= The Last Druid (film) =

Upcoming American historical drama film

- Directed by: William Eubank
- Written by: William Eubank; Philip Gawthorne; Carlyle Eubank
- Produced by: Ben Pugh; Brian Kavanaugh-Jones; Fred Berger; Adrián Guerra
- Starring: Russell Crowe; Drew McIntyre; Rose Leslie; Andreas Pietschmann; Daniel Zovatto
- Cinematography: Agustin Claramunt
- Production companies: AGC Studios; 42; CAA Media Finance; Nostromo
- Release date: June 24, 2027 (Mexico)
- Country: United States
- Language: English

The Last Druid is an upcoming American historical action drama film directed by William Eubank, who co-wrote the screenplay with Phil Gawthorne and Carlyle Eubank. It stars Russell Crowe, Rose Leslie, Andreas Pietschmann, and Daniel Zovatto.

== Premise ==
A Celtic elder living in a secluded Druid stronghold in the mountains of Caledonia must take up arms to protect his family and people from the invading Roman army.

== Cast ==
- Russell Crowe
- Rose Leslie
- Andreas Pietschmann
- Daniel Zovatto
- Drew McIntyre
- Stacy Clausen
- Pablo Derqui
- Tennyson Crowe
- Haitcham J Díaz

== Production ==
In October 2024, it was announced that Will Eubank would direct The Last Druid, from a script he co-wrote with Phil Gawthorne and Carlyle Eubank with Russell Crowe set to star. In November 2024, Amazon MGM Studios bought select international distribution rights for the film. In May 2026, Rose Leslie, Andreas Pietschmann, and Daniel Zovatto joined the cast. In June 2026, Drew McIntyre, Stacy Clausen, Pablo Derqui, and Tennyson Crowe joined the cast.

=== Filming ===
Principal photography began on June 8, 2026 in Barcelona and the Canary Islands. The film is produced by AGC Studios, 42, CAA Media Finance, and Nostromo Pictures S.L.

In late May 2026, the Catalonia Department of Agriculture, Livestock, Fisheries and Food issued a production halt order at the set in Serra de Collserola until compliance with regulations regarding the 2025 Catalonia swine fever outbreak are guaranteed. The entire Collserola Natural Park is currently closed to the public and requires wild boar countermeasures, in order to prevent the spread of the African swine fever virus. Officials in nearby Sant Cugat del Vallès cited the film when requesting that restrictions be removed for public use of the park while the Agrarian Association of Young Farmers has called for a total suspension of the film from this area during the outbreak. Agriculture minister Òscar Ordeig later allowed filming to resume.

== Release ==
The film is scheduled to be released in Mexico on June 24, 2027.
