= Joe Bird (actor) =

Australian actor (born 2007)

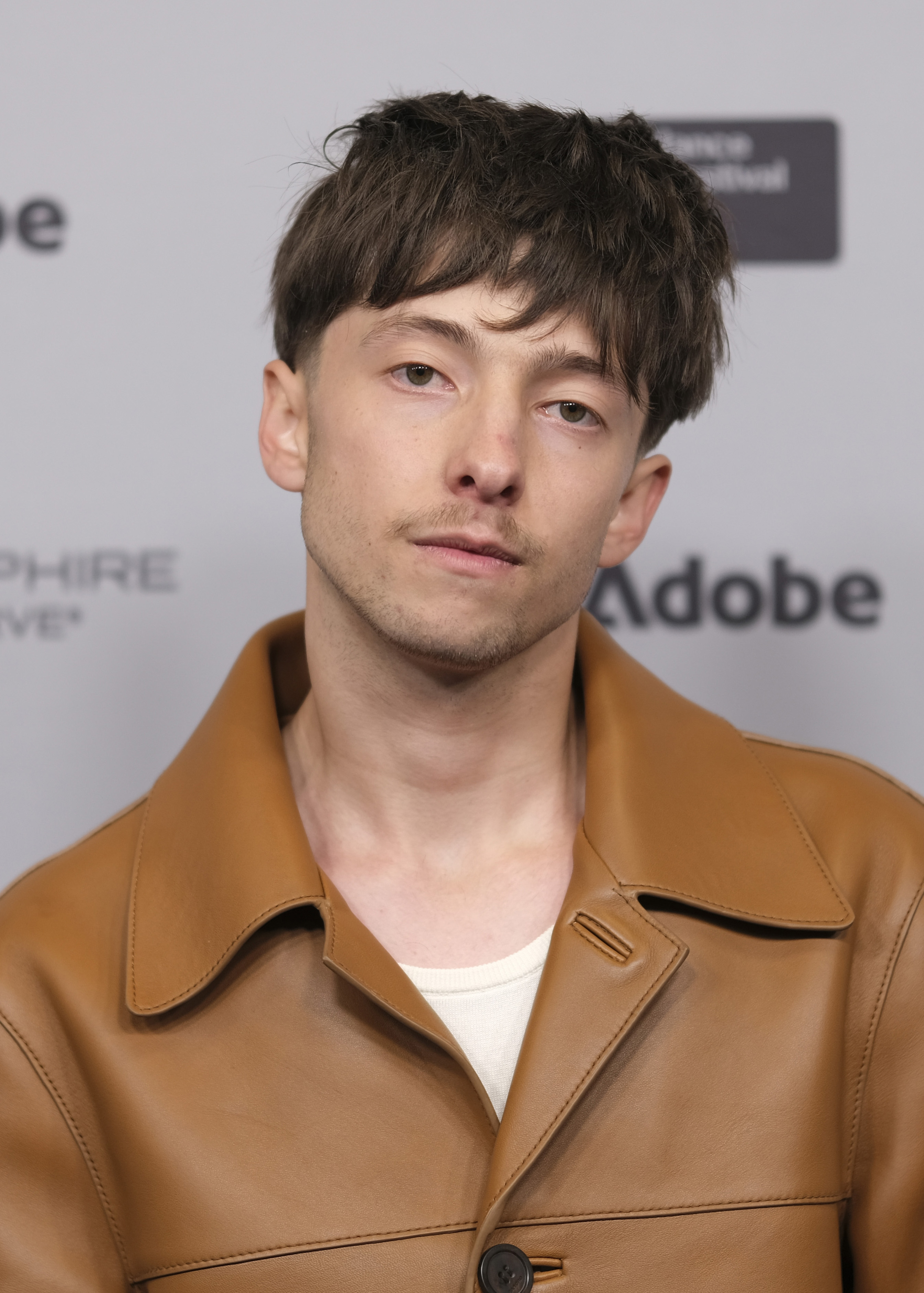
- Bird at the 2026 Sundance Film Festival
- Born: 8 April 2007 (age 19); Liverpool, England
- Citizenship: Australia; United Kingdom
- Occupation: Actor
- Years active: 2017–present

Joe Bird (born April 8, 2007) is a British-Australian actor. He is best known for his starring roles in the horror films Talk to Me (2022) and Leviticus (2026).

== Early life ==
Bird was born on April 8, 2007, in Liverpool, England and raised in Adelaide, Australia.

== Career ==
Bird is best known for his breakout performance as Riley in the horror film Talk to Me (2022), which he filmed at age 14 and earned him multiple nominations from film critics associations. He received the AACTA Young Stars Award in 2025. In 2026, he starred in the horror film Leviticus, which premiered at the Sundance Film Festival.

== Filmography ==
=== Feature film ===
Year	Title	Role	Notes	Ref.
2017	Rabbit	Aiden		
2023	Talk to Me	Riley		
2025	Wolfram	Frank		
2026	Leviticus	Naim Reid	Lead role	
2026	Crashout	Jock	In production	

=== Short film ===
Year	Title	Role	Notes
2021	Treasure	Eddy	
2026	The Worm	Kieran	Lead role
2026	Despite the Night	Cole	

=== Television ===
Year	Title	Role
2020–2022	First Day	Kevin

== Awards and nominations ==
Year	Award	Category	Work	Result
2023	Australian Film Critics Association Awards	Best Supporting Actor	Talk to Me	Nominated
2023	San Diego Film Critics Society Awards	Best Youth Performance	Talk to Me	Nominated
2023	Washington DC Area Film Critics Association Awards	Best Youth Performance	Talk to Me	Nominated
2024	Fangoria Chainsaw Awards	Best Supporting Performance	Talk to Me	Nominated
2024	Music City Film Critics' Association Awards	Best Young Actor	Talk to Me	Nominated
2024	Golden Scythe Horror Awards	Best Supporting Actor	Talk to Me	Nominated
2025	AACTA Young Stars	National Youth Casting Call	Himself	Won
2026	Fangoria Chainsaw Awards	Editor's Eyeball	Leviticus	Won
