= Drew McIntyre =

Scottish professional wrestler (born 1985)

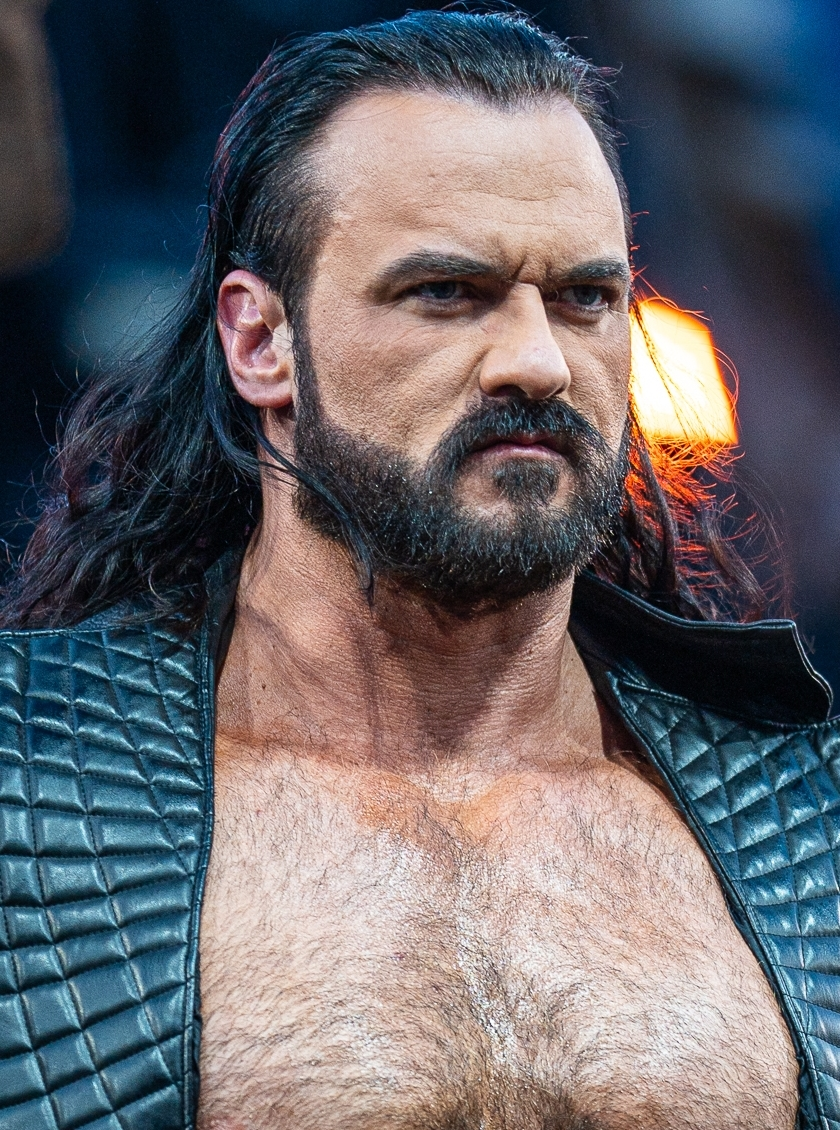
- McIntyre in 2024

Personal information
- Born: Andrew McLean Galloway IV; 6 June 1985 (age 41) Ayr, Scotland
- Education: Glasgow Caledonian University (BA)
- Spouses: Taryn Terrell (m. 2010; div. 2011) Kaitlyn Frohnapfel (m. 2016)

Professional wrestling career
- Ring name(s): Drew Galloway; Drew McIntyre
- Billed height: 6 ft 5 in (196 cm)
- Billed weight: 275 lb (125 kg)
- Billed from: Ayr, Scotland
- Trained by: Spinner McKenzie; Justin Richards; Mark Sloan; James Tighe; Colin McKay
- Debut: 2001

Andrew McLean Galloway IV (born 6 June 1985) is a Scottish professional wrestler and actor. As of April 2017, he is signed to WWE, where he performs on the SmackDown brand under the ring name Drew McIntyre.

Galloway began his career in 2001 in the United Kingdom with Scottish promotions British Championship Wrestling (BCW) and Insane Championship Wrestling (ICW), and also performed in Ireland with Irish Whip Wrestling (IWW), all under his real name stylized as Drew Galloway; he is the inaugural ICW World Heavyweight Champion. He signed a development contract with WWE in 2007, took on the ring name Drew McIntyre, and was sent to its developmental territories Ohio Valley Wrestling (OVW) and Florida Championship Wrestling (FCW) after appearances on both SmackDown and Raw. Using the moniker "The Chosen One", he returned to SmackDown in 2009 (two years since his first appearance on said brand), winning the WWE Intercontinental Championship and the WWE Tag Team Championship alongside "Dashing" Cody Rhodes. He would then be relegated to lower-card status until he was released from his WWE contract in 2014.

Between 2014 and 2017, he worked once again under his real name in several independent promotions across the world, as well as returning to ICW, where he won the ICW World Heavyweight Championship for a second time and was inducted into the ICW Hall of Fame in 2018. He made his debut for Total Nonstop Action Wrestling (TNA) in 2015, becoming a one-time TNA World Heavyweight Champion and one-time Impact Grand Champion. He also performed in Evolve, where he was a one-time Evolve Champion and two-time Evolve Tag Team Champion. He was also a one-time Open the Freedom Gate Champion due to Evolve's partnership with Dragon Gate USA. Galloway also appeared in Pro Wrestling Guerilla (PWG) between 2015 and 2016.

Galloway returned to WWE in 2017, once again as Drew McIntyre, and was assigned to NXT, where he won the NXT Championship once. Upon returning to WWE's main roster in 2018, he has since won the Raw Tag Team Championship alongside Dolph Ziggler, the 2020 Men's Royal Rumble match, the 2024 Men's Money in the Bank ladder match, three WWE Championships , and the World Heavyweight Championship. He is the 31st WWE Triple Crown champion.

== Early life ==
Andrew McLean Galloway IV was born in Ayr on 6 June 1985. He grew up in nearby Prestwick, where he studied at Prestwick Academy. He considered being a professional football player when he was younger, playing for the youth club Prestwick Boys, normally in defensive positions. When he was 10 years old, Galloway read a magazine named X Factor, which focused on conspiracy theories and ghost stories; this prompted him to write a letter to the FBI under the Freedom of Information Act, to which the FBI responded by sending him a file with several documents. A fan of professional wrestling as a child, he started training at the age of 15, and his parents agreed to support him as long as he gave the same amount of focus to his studies. He agreed and earned a bachelor's degree in criminology from Glasgow Caledonian University in 2006, also briefly attending University of Birmingham during his exchange year.

== Professional wrestling career ==
=== Independent circuit (2001–2007) ===
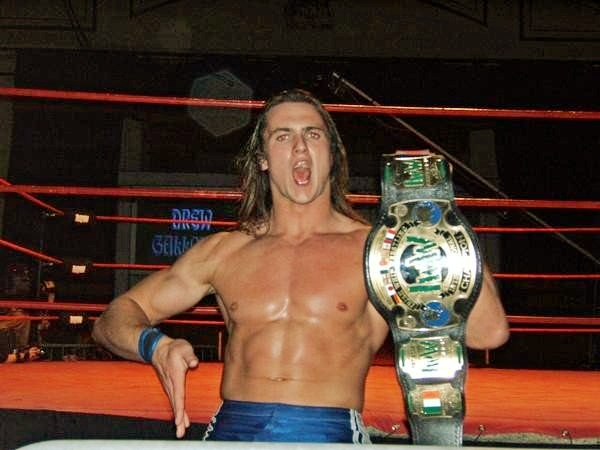
Galloway as the IWW International Heavyweight Champion in August 2006.

Galloway began training as a wrestler at the Frontier Wrestling Alliance's Academy at the age of 15 after his family moved to England and settled in Portsmouth. Although he was trained by the promotion's operator Mark Sloan along with Justin Richards and James Tighe, he also cites the promotion's established wrestlers helping out with training, including Doug Williams, Paul Burchill and Alex Shane.

In 2003, Galloway made his debut for the inaugural show of British Championship Wrestling (BCW), operating in the Greater Glasgow area. While there, he trained under Colin McKay and Spinner McKenzie, then developing the character of "Thee" Drew Galloway, a cocky narcissist. His first match, which took place at February's No Blood, No Sympathy: Night 1, saw him lose to Stu Natt. He picked up his first win on the second night in a tag team match alongside Wolfgang, defeating Blade and Stu Pendous. By December, Galloway was managed by Charles Boddington, who aided him in his first significant success and managed him for the next four years.

Later that year, Galloway had a series of matches against American veterans. In June, he lost to The Honky Tonk Man and later that month lost to Marty Jannetty and Highlander, with Sabotage on his side. In November, at the aptly titled Lo Down, Galloway main-evented against D'Lo Brown in a match which ended in a double countout. He then had a brief series of feuds as in March 2005, he defeated Jay Phoenix but their rematch in November, officiated by Mick Foley, ended in a no contest. In May 2006, after their lengthy feud in Irish Whip Wrestling, Galloway lost then won in successive matches against long-term rival Sheamus O'Shaunessy.

In November 2006, Galloway and Lionheart defeated BCW Heavyweight Champion Highlander and Wolfgang at Live in East Kilbride, after Galloway pinned Highlander. At December's No Blood, No Sympathy IV event, Galloway defeated Highlander in an "I Quit" match with Conscience as the special guest referee to win his second BCW Heavyweight Championship. He held the title through 2007, with successful defenses against the likes of Martin Stone, Allan Grogan and Lionheart, before vacating the title when he relocated to the United States in September.

After gaining momentum in Scotland, Galloway began wrestling dates across the Republic of Ireland with Irish Whip Wrestling (IWW). After losing to "SOS" Sheamus O'Shaunessy on 27 August 2006, Galloway defeated O'Shaunessy to win the IWW International Heavyweight Championship.

=== World Wrestling Entertainment/WWE (2007–2014) ===
==== Beginnings (2007–2009) ====
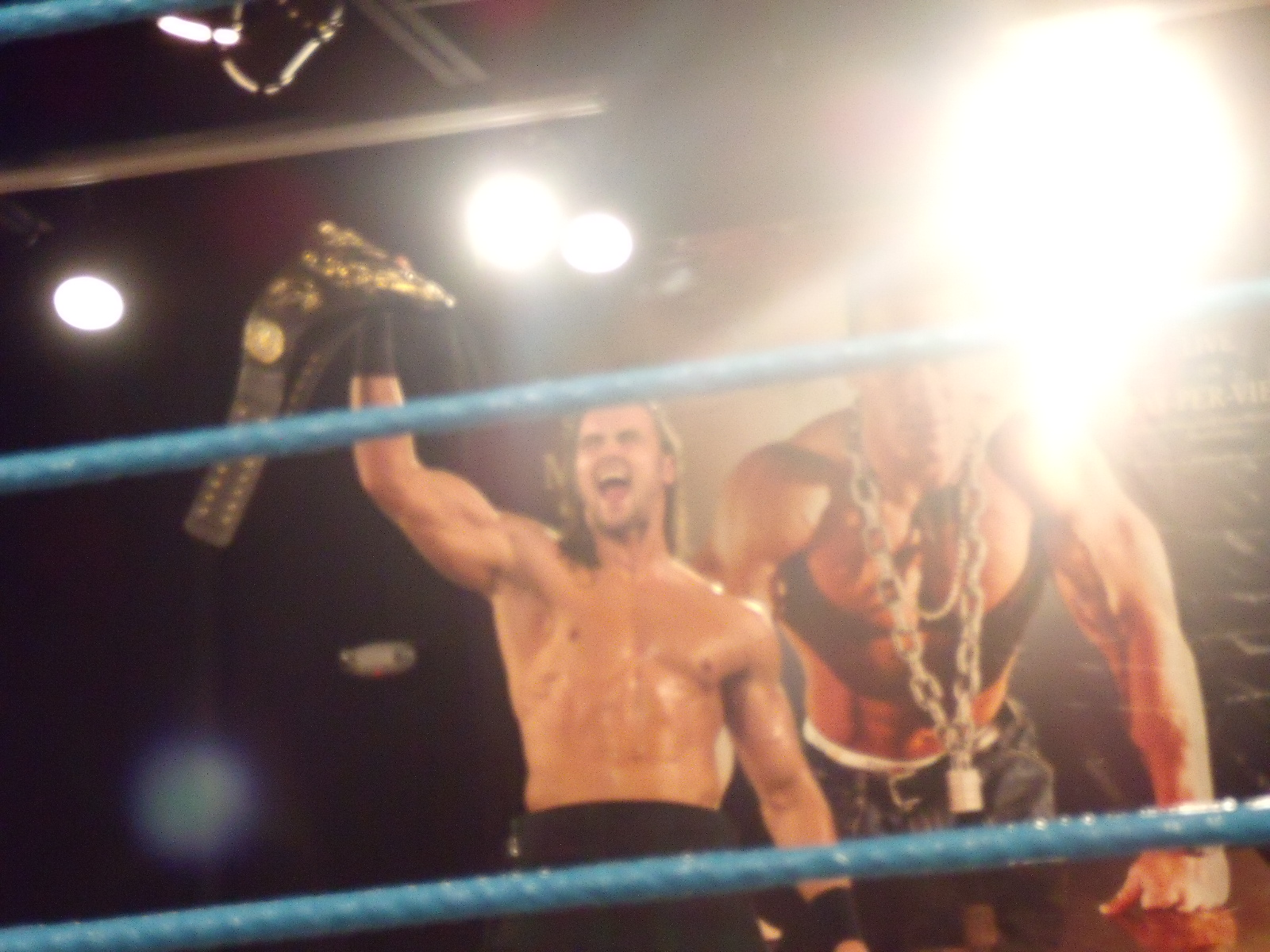
McIntyre moved to WWE's developmental territory Florida Championship Wrestling, where he won the FCW Florida Heavyweight Championship.

Galloway signed with WWE in 2007 and made his official debut on 12 October 2007 episode of SmackDown! under the modified ring name of Drew McIntyre. Accompanied by his on-screen mentor Dave Taylor, McIntyre defeated Brett Major with a roll-up, establishing himself as a villainous character. At the beginning of 2008, McIntyre was separated from Taylor and moved to the Raw brand, making his official debut on 6 January episode of Heat as a face, defeating Charlie Haas.

In September 2007, McIntyre went to Louisville, Kentucky for Ohio Valley Wrestling (OVW) and later, he was sent to the new farm territory, Florida Championship Wrestling (FCW). In FCW, he won the FCW Florida Tag Team Championship with Stu Bennett and the FCW Florida Heavyweight Championship.

==== Intercontinental Champion (2009–2010) ====
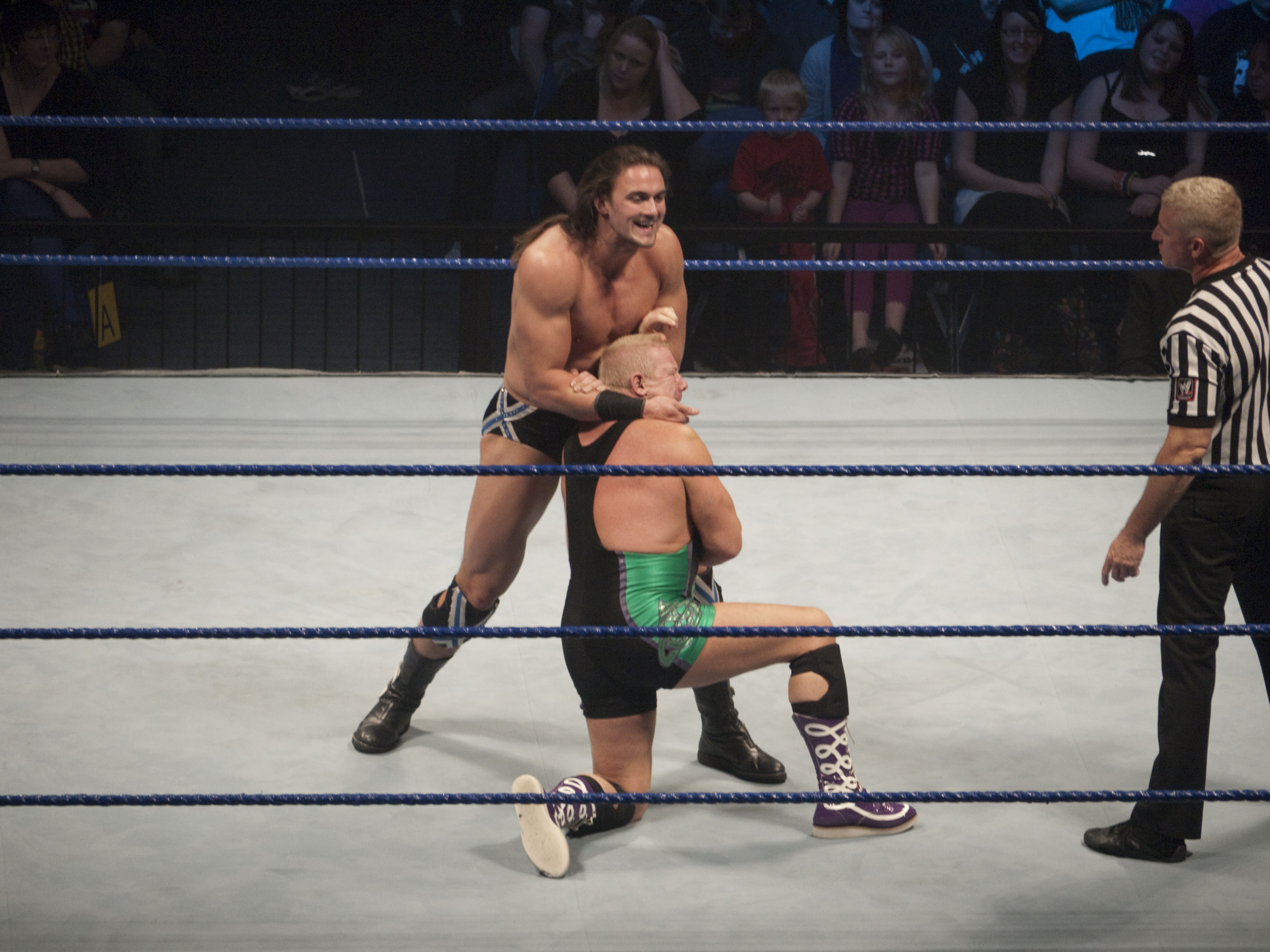
McIntyre in a match against Finlay in November 2009.

McIntyre returned to the main roster on 28 August 2009 episode of SmackDown, attacking R-Truth. One month later, he received a push when WWE chairman Mr. McMahon promoted him as a "future world champion", going by the nickname "The Chosen One". After defeating R-Truth on 4 October at the Hell in a Cell pay-per-view McIntyre participated at Survivor Series on The Miz's team for the traditional Survivor Series elimination match on 22 November, where he, The Miz and his former rival Sheamus were the surviving members on their winning team.

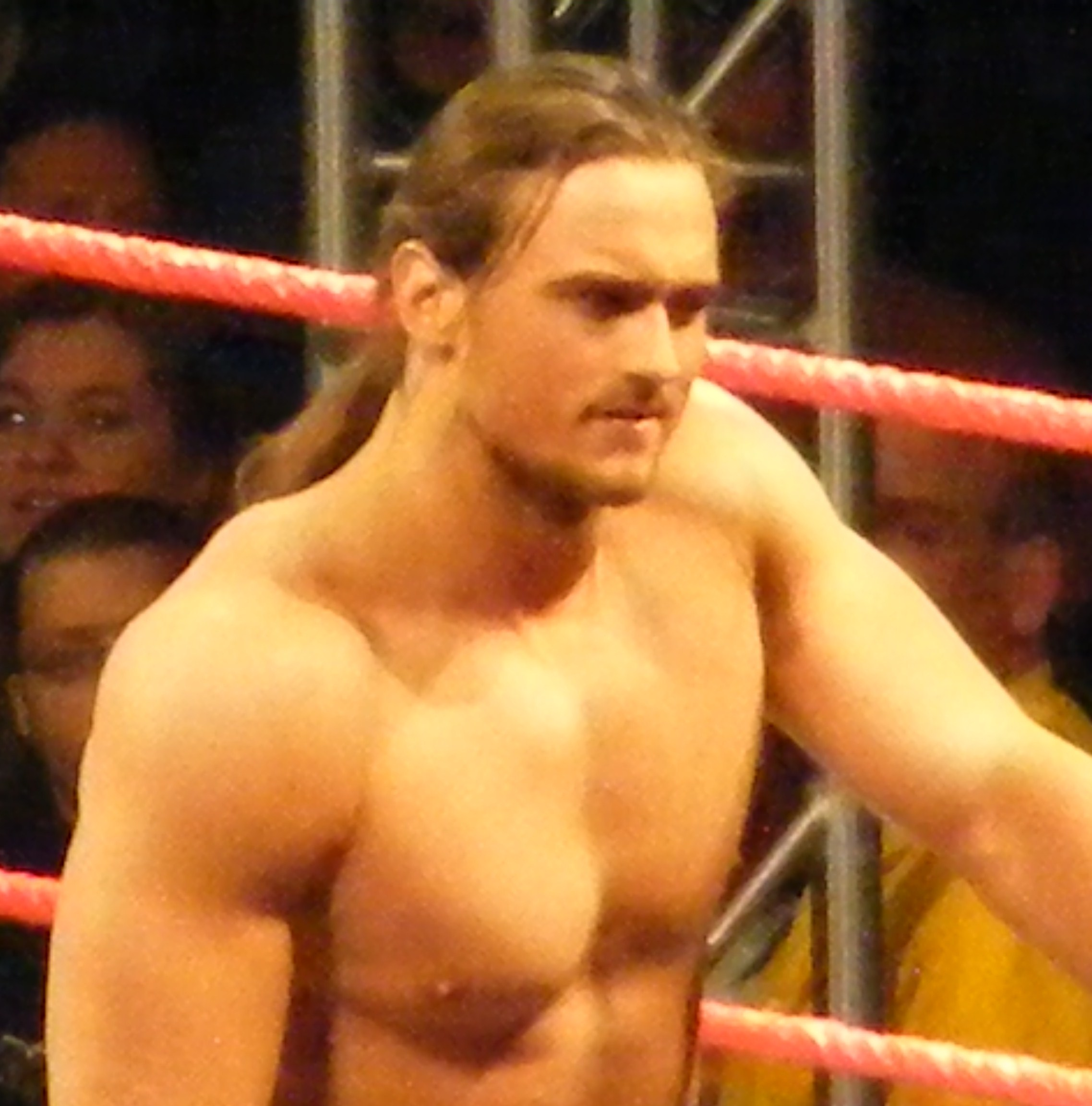
McIntyre at a house show in December 2009.

Being the only SmackDown superstar to survive against Team Morrison, McIntyre defeated John Morrison for the Intercontinental Championship at TLC: Tables, Ladders & Chairs on 13 December. He retained the title against Morrison on 1 January 2010 episode of SmackDown and Kane on 21 February at Elimination Chamber, using underhanded tactics. His televised undefeated record ended in a Money in the Bank qualifying match against Kane on 26 February episode of SmackDown, but Mr. McMahon forced SmackDown's general manager Teddy Long to expunge the loss. This happened again with Matt Hardy before McIntyre qualified for the ladder match by pinning an unsigned wrestler. McIntyre failed to win the Money in the Bank match on 28 March at WrestleMania XXVI, his first WrestleMania appearance. McIntyre continuously attacked Hardy until he was stripped of his title by Long on 7 May episode of SmackDown and fired for the purposes of the storyline. However, McMahon decreed he be reinstated as champion the following week, undermining Long's authority and developing tension between McIntyre and Long.

At Over the Limit on 23 May, McIntyre lost the Intercontinental Championship to Kofi Kingston—who had won a tournament to determine the new champion, ending his reign at 161 days. However, he still used his relationship with McMahon to bully Long, publicly humiliating and forcing Long to lie down for him for their match. At Fatal 4-Way on 20 June, McIntyre failed to regain the title from Kingston after Long took over as the referee and refused to make the three count, allowing Hardy to attack McIntyre, leading to Kingston winning the match. On 21 June episode of Raw, The Nexus attacked McMahon, which removed him from television for a prolonged period and ended McIntyre's preferential treatment. After losing to Hardy on 25 June episode of SmackDown, Long informed McIntyre that his work visa had expired and that he would be deported back to Scotland immediately. This storyline had a basis in reality, since Galloway's visa had indeed expired and he was taken off television. He returned two weeks later and was re-instated after being made to beg Long.

==== Tag Team Champion and losing streak (2010–2012) ====
On 19 September, McIntyre and Cody Rhodes won the WWE Tag Team Championship in a five-team tag team turmoil match at Night of Champions, allowing them to appear on both brands. McIntyre and Rhodes successfully defended the titles twice against The Hart Dynasty before losing them at Bragging Rights on 24 October to The Nexus (John Cena and David Otunga), after which they dissolved their partnership the following week.

At Survivor Series on 21 November, McIntyre participated in a 5-on-5 traditional Survivor Series tag team match as a member of Team Del Rio against Team Mysterio. He was the final man remaining on his team before being eliminated by Big Show. McIntyre entered the 40-man Royal Rumble match at the titular event on 30 January 2011, but was eliminated by Big Show. At Elimination Chamber on 20 February, he participated in the SmackDown Elimination Chamber match for the World Heavyweight Championship, but was eliminated by Kane.

On 26 April, McIntyre was drafted to the Raw brand as part of the 2011 supplemental draft. On 15 December episode of Superstars, McIntyre defeated Justin Gabriel, earning him a contract with SmackDown. He began wrestling on SmackDown on 30 December and resumed his tense relationship with general manager Theodore Long, who put pressure on McIntyre to win matches to justify his contract. McIntyre subsequently began an eight match losing streak going into the new year, after the last of which, Long fired McIntyre within the storyline. A week later, McIntyre was reinstated by guest general manager John Laurinaitis and ended his losing streak by defeating Hornswoggle. He was subsequently included on Laurinaitis' team in the 12-man tag team match at WrestleMania XXVIII on 1 April, helping to earn Laurinaitis control of both Raw and SmackDown. He continued to lose matches and was confined to Superstars and house shows, but still made appearances on Raw and SmackDown, albeit in squash matches.

When WWE rebranded its developmental territory, FCW, into NXT, McIntyre was inserted into the Gold Rush Tournament to crown the inaugural NXT Champion, where he lost to the eventual winner Seth Rollins in the quarterfinals on 1 August episode of NXT. McIntyre also participated in a number one contender fatal four-way elimination match on 7 November episode of NXT, but was eliminated by Bo Dallas.

==== 3MB (2012–2014) ====
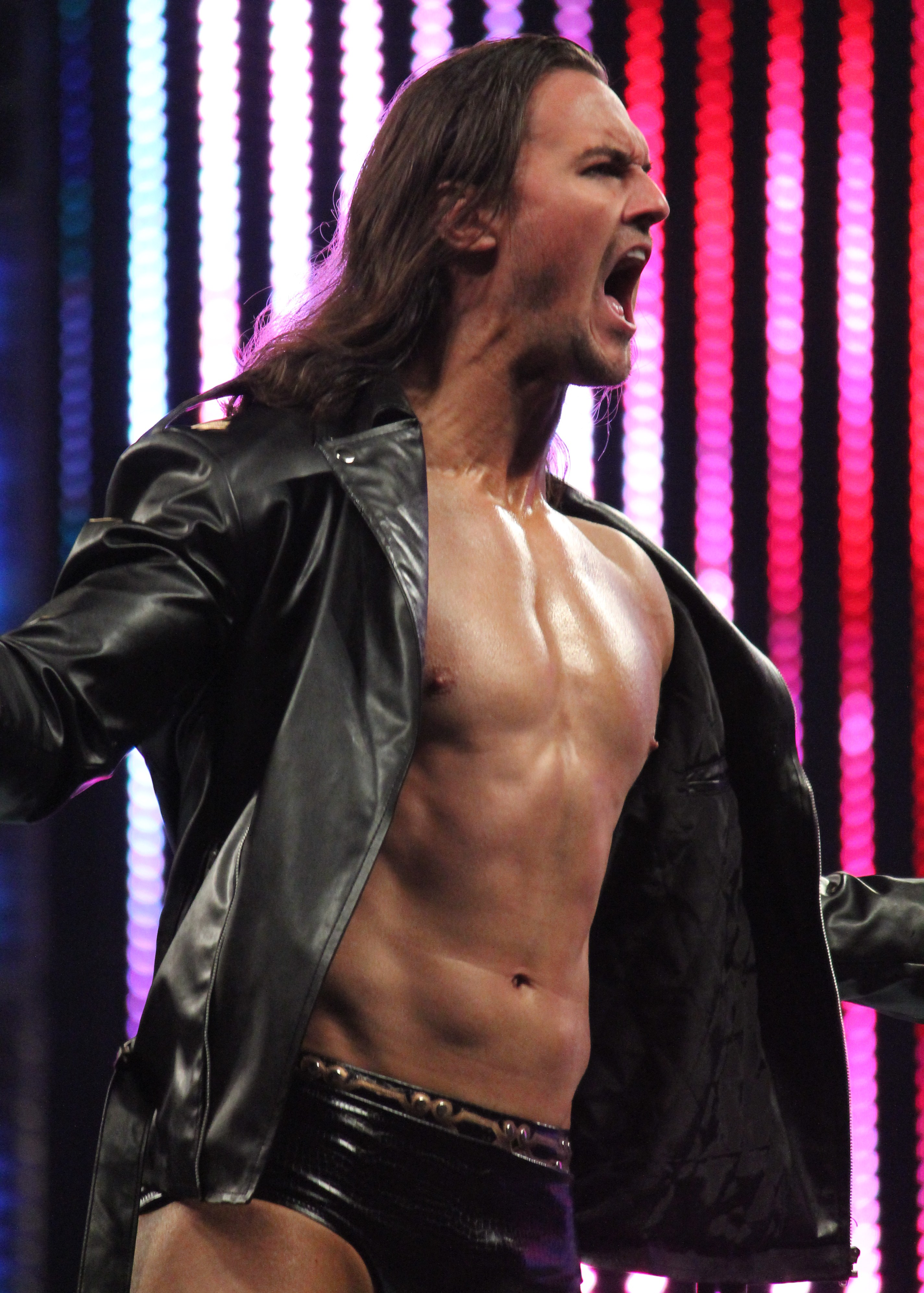
McIntyre as a member of 3MB.

On 21 September episode of SmackDown, McIntyre and Jinder Mahal interfered in a match between Heath Slater and Brodus Clay by attacking Clay, aligning themselves with Slater. The trio became known as the Three Man Band, or 3MB for short. At TLC: Tables, Ladders & Chairs on 16 December, after being guests on Miz TV and harassing the Spanish announce team, 3MB challenged The Miz and Alberto Del Rio to find a partner for a six-man tag team match later that night. Miz announced their partner to be the Brooklyn Brawler and defeated 3MB. The next night on Raw, 3MB lost to The Miz and Del Rio again with Tommy Dreamer as their partner. On 31 December episode of Raw, McIntyre and Slater failed to win the WWE Tag Team Championship from Team Hell No (Daniel Bryan and Kane). They also lost in the first round of the NXT Tag Team Championship tournament to Adrian Neville and Oliver Grey on 23 January episode of NXT.

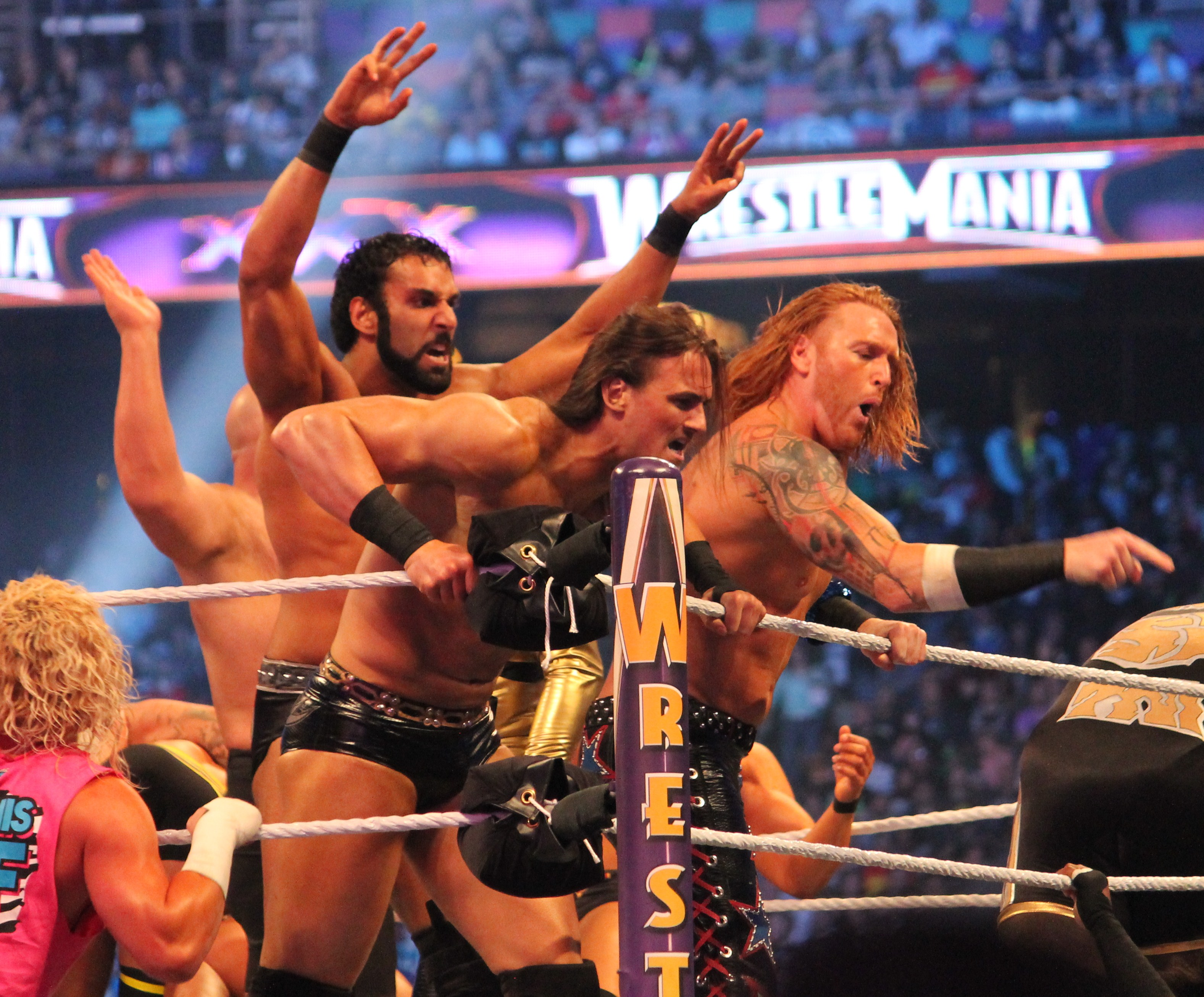
3MB at WrestleMania XXX.

At Royal Rumble on 27 January 2013, McIntyre was eliminated by Chris Jericho in the 30-man Royal Rumble match. On 12 April episode of SmackDown, in an attempt to make a name for themselves, 3MB tried to attack Triple H, but were attacked themselves by The Shield (Dean Ambrose, Seth Rollins and Roman Reigns). On 15 April episode of Raw, 3MB called out The Shield, only for Brock Lesnar to come out instead and attack the group. McIntyre made his last appearance on 6 April 2014 at WrestleMania XXX in the André the Giant Memorial Battle Royal, and was released from his WWE contract on 12 June.

=== Return to ICW (2014–2017) ===
Galloway, under his real name, made his first post-WWE appearance on 27 July 2014, returning to work for Mark Dallas at Insane Championship Wrestling (ICW) for the first time in seven years and beginning a feud with Jack Jester. On 2 November, at ICW's Fear & Loathing VII event at The Barrowlands, Galloway defeated Jester in the main event to become a two-time ICW Heavyweight Champion. He made his first international ICW title defense in Denmark on 20 December in a double championship triple threat match against Dansk Pro Wrestling Champion Michael Fynne and Chaos, both retaining the ICW title and winning the DPW Heavyweight Championship. The next day at Space Baws 5: Bill Murray Strikes Back, he answered the challenge of Lewis Girvan, who had been goading Galloway for a match. After successfully defending the ICW Heavyweight Championship against Girvan, Galloway announced his intention to make the title a world championship by continuing to defend it internationally.

On 9 February 2015, after defending the title against Matt Hardy in a match for Family Wrestling Entertainment in New York, he subsequently renamed it the ICW World Heavyweight Championship. On 28 March, Galloway made his first defense at BarraMania in Scotland as "World Champion", defeating Joe Coffey. On 5 April, Galloway successfully defended the ICW title against Doug Williams at a Revolution Pro Wrestling (RPW) show in England. On 11 April, Galloway defeated Grado to retain the world championship; after the match, both men were attacked by returning former champion Jack Jester. The following night, Galloway suffered his first loss in ICW since his return, where he and Grado lost to Jester and Sabu after Grado was pinned. On 18 April, Galloway defeated Jester and Grado in a triple threat match to retain the championship, before having it stolen post-match by Sabu. The following night, at Alex Kidd in London, Galloway regained possession of the belt and retained it in an Elimination Three Way Dance against Sabu and Jester. Galloway finished the "Insane Entertainment Tour" by defeating Mikey Whiplash in the main event of Flawless Victory on 2 May to retain the ICW World Heavyweight Championship. On 16 October, at a Maximum Wrestling show in Germany, Galloway successfully defended the ICW World Championship in a triple threat match against Apu Singh and Chaos, in which Chaos' UEWA European Heavyweight Championship was also on the line.

At Shug's Hoose Party 2, Galloway turned heel along with Jester and ICW General Manager Red Lightning, aligning to form The Black Label. With Jester's help, he successfully defended the championship against Big Damo in the main event. As part of the "Road to Fear & Loathing" tour, Galloway retained the ICW title against Rampage Brown, Doug Williams, Matt Daly and Coach Trip. On 15 November, Galloway lost the title to Grado at Fear & Loathing VIII. Galloway returned to ICW in February 2016, scoring wins over Mark Coffey, Noam Dar and BT Gunn, but losing a match against Chris Renfrew for the ICW World Heavyweight Championship.

Galloway was out of action from August until November due to a back injury, but appeared on ICW shows in non-wrestling roles to further his feud with Mark Dallas. On 19 November, Galloway announced his departure from ICW due to the severity of his injuries, reconciling with Dallas before attacking him and revealing it to have been a rouse. On 1 February 2018, Galloway was inducted into the ICW Hall of Fame.

On 14 June 2024, he made a one-night return to ICW at After Hours, a day before his match at Clash at the Castle: Scotland against World Heavyweight Champion Damian Priest.

=== Evolve (2014–2017) ===
On 8 August 2014, Galloway debuted for Evolve, defeating Chris Hero for the Evolve Championship. At Evolve 33, he lost a Champion vs Champion match against the DGUSA Open The Freedom Gate champion, Ricochet. Galloway continued to defend the Evolve Championship at independent events in the United States against the likes of Caleb Konley, Stevie Richards, Devin Thomas, Jimmy Rave, Victor Sterling and Rich Swann (on Evolve iPPV at Evolve 34), internationally in Scotland against Kid Fite, Johnny Moss, Big Damo and Andy Wild, and in England over reigning NWA World Tag Team Champion Davey Boy Smith Jr. On 9 January 2015, Galloway renamed his title the "Evolve World Championship". Galloway made his first successful defense as world champion the following night against Ricochet at Evolve 37.

At Mercury Rising 2015, Galloway defeated Johnny Gargano for the Dragon Gate USA Open the Freedom Gate Championship in a Title vs Title match, retaining the Evolve Championship to become a double champion. Galloway made a series of defenses of both titles between 4 and 6 April in Scotland, England and Northern Ireland, defeating Marty Scurll, Doug Williams and Joe Hendry, Tron and Luther Valentine in a fatal-four-way match. At Evolve 43, Galloway made his first standalone defense of the DGUSA Open the Freedom Gate Championship, defeating Biff Busick. At Evolve 44, Galloway defeated Roderick Strong to retain the Evolve Championship. On 10 July, Galloway lost both the Evolve World Championship and the Open the Freedom Gate Championship to Timothy Thatcher; he had been the longest reigning Evolve champion in history and set the record for most successful title defenses. At Evolve 46, after defeating Trent Barreta, he was attacked by The Premiere Athlete Brand, but afterwards, uncharacteristically attacked Andrea, threatened SoCal Val and assaulted a referee. Galloway was suspended from EVOLVE, but returned at Evolve 51, defeating FIP World Heavyweight Champion Caleb Konley. At Evolve 52, he failed to regain the Evolve Championship from Thatcher.

Between 22 and 24 January 2016, Galloway and Gargano entered a three-day tournament to crown the inaugural Evolve Tag Team Champions, defeating Catch Point (Drew Gulak and T. J. Perkins), The Bravado Brothers, and Chris Hero and Tommy End in the finals to win the tournament and championship. At Evolve 59, they lost the titles to Gulak and Tracy Williams; after the match, Galloway claimed that he spent his entire title reign as Evolve champion bringing legitimacy to Evolve, only for WWE and more specifically NXT to come and squash everything he did, while also claiming the company's working relationship with WWE was compromising independent wrestling. Galloway then turned on Gargano by attacking him and Ethan Page, whom he defeated at Evolve 60. Galloway aligned himself with other WWE stars, including Ethan Carter III, defeating Gargano and TJP in a street fight at Evolve 62 with help from Hero, who joined their group and claimed that Cody Rhodes would be joining. At Evolve 63, Galloway defeated Page in an "Anything Goes" match. At Evolve 64, a match between Galloway and Gulak was rescheduled as an Evolve Tag Team Championship main event match between Catch Point and Galloway and the returning Chuck Taylor (now under the name "Dustin"), in which they won the titles, making Galloway the first ever two-time Evolve Tag Team Champion.

At Evolve 65, Galloway defeated Gargano. Dustin and Galloway made their first Evolve Tag Team Championship defense at Evolve 67 on 20 August 2016, teaming with EC3 against Fred Yehi, TJP and Ethan Page (replacement for Tracy Williams) in a no disqualification six man tag-team match, which they lost after EC3 was pinned, also resulting in a title change. Galloway also built a feud with former partner Rhodes and veteran announcer Joey Styles, after they both refused his invitation to join his "crusade". On 13 November, while Galloway was out with an injury, their replacement, Hero, lost the Evolve Tag Team Championship. However, it was announced that, despite supposed champions Catch Point holding the physical belts, Evolve continued to recognize Galloway and Dustin as the Evolve Tag Team Champions.

=== Return to the independent circuit (2014–2017) ===
In April 2015, Galloway won the Scottish Wrestling Alliance's Scottish Heavyweight Championship and held it until November. In May, Galloway debuted for Lucha Libre AAA Worldwide (AAA), teaming with Angelico and El Mesias against Matt Hardy, Mr. Anderson and Johnny Mundo. He returned to Mexico in November to main-event a series of AAA affiliated shows, working three six-man tag matches against Rey Mysterio, Blue Demon and Dr. Wagner Jr.; his partners included Matt Cross, Carlito and Brodus Clay.

In August, Galloway debuted for Preston City Wrestling (PCW), trading victories with Noam Dar. Galloway returned to PCW in February 2016, entering the Road to Glory tournament, defeating Martin Kirby, Mr. Anderson and Noam Dar, before losing to Rampage Brown in the finals. The following month, Galloway entered the Westside Xtreme Wrestling (wXw) 16 Carat Gold tournament, but lost to Axel Dieter Jr. in the semi-finals. On 25 June, Galloway main-evented the first HD iPPV in European Wrestling history when he returned to PCW at their "Tribute to the Troops 3" show, receiving his championship opportunity in a triple threat match with Sha Samuels and Noam Dar, but lost after Samuels submitted Dar.

=== Total Nonstop Action Wrestling (2015–2017) ===
On 29 January 2015, Galloway made a surprise debut under his real name for Total Nonstop Action Wrestling during the tapings of Impact Wrestling as a face in Glasgow, Scotland, coming to the aid of TNA British Boot Camp season 2 competitor Grado and entering a feud with The Beat Down Clan. Galloway competed in his first official match for TNA on 6 March, answering the Beat Down Clan's challenge and defeating Kenny King. On 27 March episode of Impact Wrestling, he formed the stable "The Rising" with Eli Drake and Micah. On 10 April episode of Impact Wrestling, The Rising defeated The BDC by disqualification when a masked man (Homicide) ran out and attacked Galloway. At Hardcore Justice on 1 May, Galloway defeated Low Ki in a Steel Pipe on a Pole match. At Slammiversary on 28 June, Galloway competed in the King of the Mountain match for the vacant TNA King of the Mountain Championship in a losing effort. On 1 July episode of Impact Wrestling, The Beat Down Clan defeated The Rising in a 4-on-3 handicap match, forcing The Rising to dissolve.

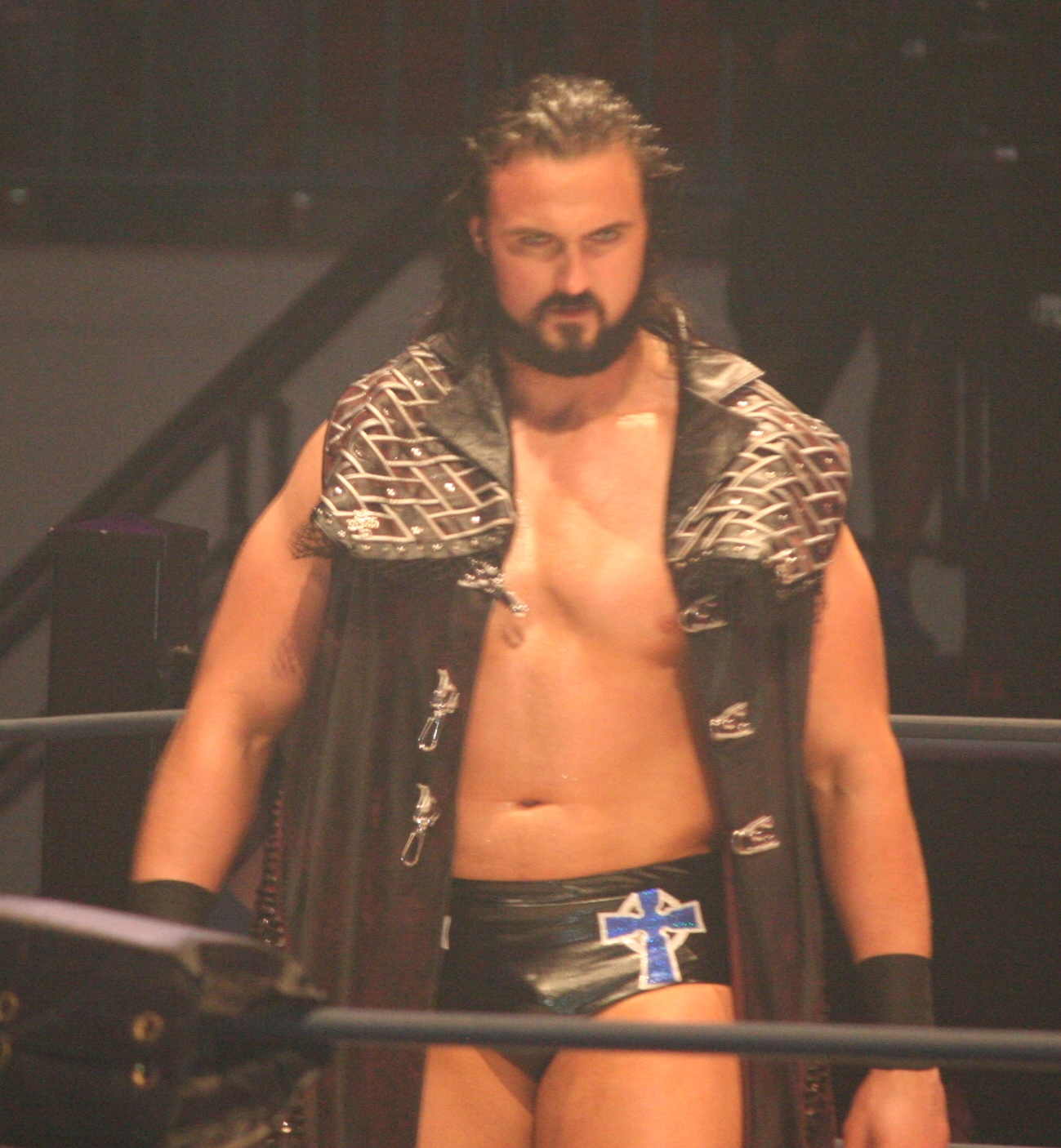
Galloway at the 2015 Bound for Glory.

On 15 July episode of Impact Wrestling, Galloway won a 20-man battle royal to face Ethan Carter III for the TNA World Heavyweight Championship later that night, but lost after his former The Rising teammate Eli Drake attacked him. Galloway lost to Drake at No Surrender on 5 August but won a No Disqualification rematch at Turning Point on 19 August. On 16 September episode of Impact Wrestling, Team TNA (Galloway, Bobby Lashley, Davey Richards, Eddie Edwards and Bram) defeated Team GFW (Jeff Jarrett, Eric Young, Chris Mordetzky, Brian Myers and Sonjay Dutt) in a Lethal Lockdown match to oust GFW from TNA when Galloway pinned Myers after a Future Shock DDT onto a trash can. On 23 September episode of Impact Wrestling, after winning a five-way elimination match against Bram, Lashley, Richards and Edwards; Galloway became the number one contender for Ethan Carter III's TNA World Heavyweight Championship. At Bound for Glory on 4 October, Galloway competed in a three-way match for the world title, which was won by Matt Hardy. During October and November, Galloway participated in the TNA World Title Series for the vacant title, which he qualified to the round of 16 by defeating Bram, Rockstar Spud and Grado. However, he failed to advance past the round of 8 after he was defeated by Lashley, thus being eliminated from the TNA World Title Series.

Galloway entered a short-lived storyline with Kurt Angle; on 8 January 2016 at TNA One Night Only: Live, Galloway and Angle competed in a 3-Way TNA World Tag Team Championship match, which The Wolves won. On 12 January episode of Impact Wrestling, Galloway lost to Angle. Galloway earned a future TNA World Heavyweight Championship match by grabbing the briefcase that contained said title shot in the 2016 Feast or Fired match. They faced off in a rematch in Manchester, England on 9 February episode of Impact Wrestling, which Galloway won. After the match, he bowed before Angle, showing respect due to it being part of Angle's farewell tour.

On 15 March episode of Impact Wrestling, Galloway cashed in his Feast or Fired briefcase on Matt Hardy to capture the TNA World Heavyweight Championship for the first time in his career, thus becoming the first-ever Scottish-born TNA World Heavyweight Champion. He made his first successful title defense on 29 March episode of Impact Wrestling against Jeff Hardy. On 5 April episode of Impact Wrestling, Galloway defeated Matt Hardy in a rematch to retain the title.

At Sacrifice on 26 April, Galloway overcame rib injuries inflicted from having been repeatedly speared by Lashley to retain his title over Bound for Gold winner Tyrus. On 17 May episode of Impact Wrestling, Galloway won a lumberjack match against Lashley, who was at the time the number one contender, by disqualification after he was dragged from the ring and assaulted by the heel lumberjacks, thus retaining his championship. Galloway lost the title to Lashley at Slammiversary on 12 June, ending his reign at 89 days. Galloway was twice unsuccessful in regaining his championship from Lashley due to the involvement of Ethan Carter III, leading to an unsanctioned fight at Destination X on 12 July which ended in a no contest.

Galloway was one of the eight men to enter the Bound for Glory Playoff tournament to challenge for the TNA World Heavyweight Championship at Bound for Glory. On 22 July episode of Impact Wrestling, Galloway defeated Bram in the first round of the tournament but was eliminated from the semi-finals by Mike Bennett following interference from Moose and a third inadvertent collision with EC3. On 25 August episode of Impact Wrestling, after losing to EC3 for a world title shot against Lashley at Bound for Glory, Galloway attacked special guest referee Aron Rex, turning heel in the process. Galloway then joined the qualifying tournament for the inaugural Impact Grand Championship. After defeating Braxton Sutter in the quarterfinals and Eddie Edwards (via split decision) in the semi-finals, he was scheduled to face Rex in the finals at Bound for Glory to crown the first Grand Champion, but due to an injury he was replaced by Edwards.

On 8 December episode of Impact Wrestling, Galloway made his return by interrupting the Impact Grand Champion Moose and criticising the company. On 19 January 2017 episode of Impact Wrestling, Galloway defeated Moose to win the Impact Grand Championship. Galloway retained the title against Moose in a rematch at Genesis on 27 January and Mahabali Shera on 9 February episode of Impact Wrestling. On 26 February, Galloway confirmed that he had parted ways with TNA. He lost the championship back to Moose via split decision in a second rematch on 2 March episode of Impact Wrestling.

=== Pro Wrestling Guerrilla (2015–2016) ===
Galloway debuted for Pro Wrestling Guerrilla in August 2015, competing in the Battle of Los Angeles tournament. He was eliminated by eventual finalist "Speedball" Mike Bailey on Night 2, before teaming with Chuck Taylor, Aero Star, Drew Gulak and Trent in a winning ten-man tag effort the following night, against Timothy Thatcher, Andrew Everett, Drago, Mark Andrews and Tommaso Ciampa. He returned to PWG on 2 January 2016, for Lemmy, where he scored his first PWG singles victory over former PWG World Tag Team Champion Jack Evans. Galloway was granted a title shot at Bowie on 12 February, challenging former rival Roderick Strong for the PWG World Championship, but lost. Galloway returned to PWG in March to face Trent and Trevor Lee at All Star Weekend 12, but lost both contests. At Prince on 20 May, he issued an open challenge and defeated Michael Elgin.

=== Return to WWE ===
==== NXT Champion (2017–2018) ====
On 1 April 2017, Galloway, once again billed as Drew McIntyre, was shown on-screen sitting in the front row at NXT TakeOver: Orlando. It was later confirmed in an exclusive interview with ESPN that he had re-signed with WWE, and would perform in its developmental territory NXT. On 12 April episode of NXT, McIntyre made his NXT re-debut as a fan favorite, with new entrance music and displaying mannerisms he had developed on the independent circuit, defeating Oney Lorcan. On 19 July episode of NXT, McIntyre defeated Killian Dain to become the number one contender for the NXT Championship, which he won by defeating Bobby Roode at NXT TakeOver: Brooklyn III on 19 August. After the match, McIntyre was attacked by Bobby Fish, Kyle O'Reilly, and the debuting Adam Cole.

On 4 October episode of NXT, McIntyre successfully defended the title against Roderick Strong. The following month, McIntyre began a feud with Andrade "Cien" Almas, leading to general manager William Regal scheduling a championship match at NXT TakeOver: WarGames on 18 November. The night before that event, McIntyre defeated Adam Cole to retain the title, with Shawn Michaels as the special guest referee at a house show in San Antonio, Texas. The title defense eventually aired on the WWE Network on 3 January 2018. McIntyre lost the NXT Championship to Almas at WarGames, marking his first loss in NXT and ending his reign at 91 days. It was then revealed that McIntyre suffered a torn bicep towards the end of the match.

==== Return to the main roster (2018–2019) ====
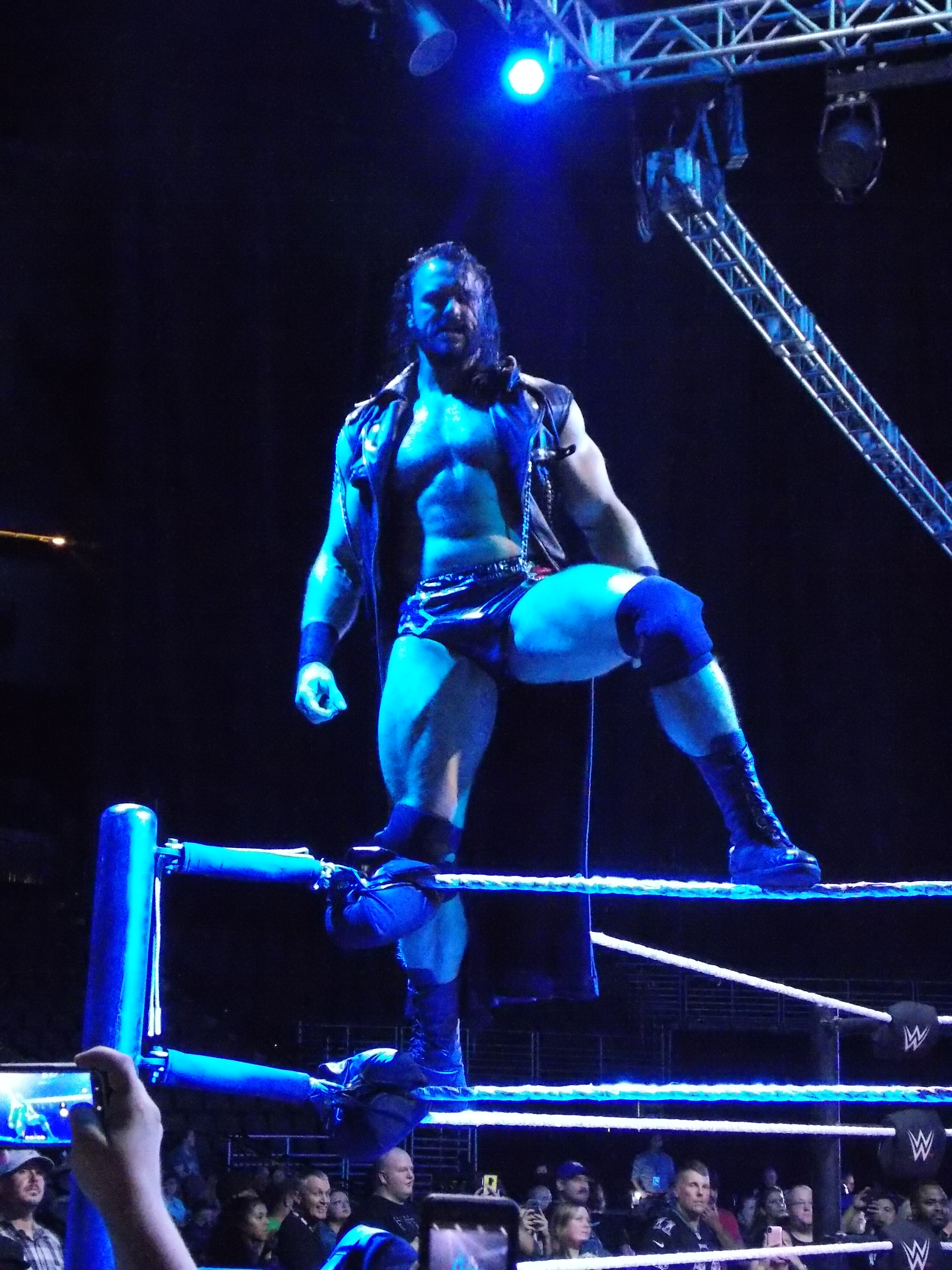
McIntyre at a live event in August 2019.

McIntyre returned from injury on the 16 April 2018 episode of Raw during the Superstar Shake-up, attacking Titus Worldwide (Apollo Crews and Titus O'Neil), and aligning with Dolph Ziggler, turning heel and officially joining Raw in the process. McIntyre assisted Ziggler during his feud with Intercontinental Champion Seth Rollins and they won the Raw Tag Team Championship from The B-Team (Bo Dallas and Curtis Axel) on 3 September episode of Raw, beginning their first reign together and McIntyre's second reign individually. McIntyre and Ziggler retained the titles against Rollins and Dean Ambrose at Hell in a Cell on 16 September. At Super Show-Down on 6 October, McIntyre, Ziggler, and Braun Strowman lost to The Shield (Dean Ambrose, Roman Reigns and Rollins). On 22 October episode of Raw, McIntyre and Ziggler lost the titles to Rollins and Ambrose after Strowman attacked McIntyre. On 18 November, at Survivor Series, McIntyre competed as part of Team Raw in the Survivor Series match, where he, Bobby Lashley and Strowman were the survivors for Team Raw.

On 3 December episode of Raw, McIntyre and Ziggler's alliance ended after McIntyre claimed that Ziggler was "a means to an end to get him into a prominent position". This led to an impromptu match between the two, which Ziggler won after interference from Finn Bálor, thus giving McIntyre his first pinfall loss since his return to the main roster. At TLC: Tables, Ladders & Chairs on 16 December, McIntyre lost to Bálor after interference from Ziggler. On 31 December episode of Raw, McIntyre defeated Ziggler in a steel cage match, ending their feud. At the Royal Rumble on 27 January 2019, McIntyre entered the Royal Rumble match at number 16, but was eliminated by Ziggler.

At Fastlane on 10 March, McIntyre, Baron Corbin and Lashley lost to The Shield. The next night on Raw, McIntyre viciously assaulted Roman Reigns before his match with Corbin, leading to a falls count anywhere match with Dean Ambrose later that night, which McIntyre won. At WrestleMania 35 on 7 April, McIntyre lost to Reigns. On 6 May episode of Raw, McIntyre interrupted Reigns and demanded a WrestleMania rematch, which Reigns accepted and won by disqualification. After this, McIntyre became the enforcer of Shane McMahon. At Stomping Grounds on 23 June, McIntyre again lost to Reigns despite interference from McMahon. On 14 July, McIntyre and McMahon lost to Reigns and The Undertaker in a No Holds Barred tag team match at Extreme Rules, ending their feud. Following the event, McIntyre ended his association with McMahon. In August, McIntyre competed in the King of the Ring tournament, but was eliminated in the first round by Ricochet. On 21 October episode of Raw, he was revealed as a member of Ric Flair's team at Crown Jewel on 31 October, but they lost to Team Hogan. At Survivor Series on 24 November, McIntyre made up part of Team Raw in a losing effort to Team SmackDown in a 5-on-5-on-5 Survivor Series match, also involving Team NXT.

==== WWE Champion (2020–2021) ====
At Royal Rumble on 26 January 2020, McIntyre won the Royal Rumble match, earning himself a championship opportunity at WrestleMania 36. In the match, McIntyre eliminated six participants, including WWE Champion Brock Lesnar, who he challenged for the title the next night on Raw, cementing his face turn in the process. On Night 2 of WrestleMania on 5 April, McIntyre defeated Lesnar in the main event to capture the WWE Championship. He made his first successful title defense against Big Show on the same night, which was televised the following night on Raw.

McIntyre successfully defended the WWE Championship against Seth Rollins at Money in the Bank on 10 May, Bobby Lashley at Backlash on 14 June, and Ziggler at The Horror Show at Extreme Rules on 19 July. He then transitioned into a feud with Randy Orton for the title, culminating in successful defenses at SummerSlam on 23 August and in an Ambulance match at Clash of Champions on 27 September. At Hell in a Cell on 25 October, McIntyre lost the title to Orton in a Hell in a Cell match, ending his first reign at 203 days (202 days as recognised by WWE). On 16 November episode of Raw, McIntyre regained the WWE Championship from Orton in a no disqualification match, ending their feud. As a result, he took Orton's place to face Universal Champion Roman Reigns at Survivor Series on 22 November in an interbrand champion vs. champion match, which McIntyre lost via technical submission after interference from Jey Uso. On 20 December, McIntyre successfully defended the title against A.J. Styles and The Miz, who cashed in his Money in the Bank contract, in a triple threat tables, ladders, and chairs match at TLC: Tables, Ladders & Chairs. After retaining the title against Keith Lee on 4 January 2021 episode of Raw, a rematch between McIntyre and Orton on 11 January was cancelled after McIntyre tested positive for COVID-19. He retained the title against Goldberg at Royal Rumble on 31 January.

At Elimination Chamber on 21 February, McIntyre successfully defended the title in an Elimination Chamber match against Orton, Sheamus, Jeff Hardy, Styles and Kofi Kingston. After the match, he was attacked by Bobby Lashley and The Miz, who cashed in his Money In The Bank briefcase (that he got reinstated due to a loophole in the contract), performing the Skull-Crushing Finale to pin McIntyre and win the WWE Championship, ending his second reign at 97 days (96 days as recognised by WWE). At Fastlane on 21 March, McIntyre defeated Sheamus in a No Holds Barred match. McIntyre then failed to regain the WWE Championship from Lashley at Night 1 of WrestleMania 37 on 10 April, WrestleMania Backlash on 16 May in a triple threat match also involving Braun Strowman, and Hell in a Cell on 20 June inside the namesake structure.

==== Various feuds and alliances (2021–2023) ====
On 18 July at Money in the Bank, McIntyre competed in the namesake ladder match, but failed to win the briefcase after being attacked by Jinder Mahal, Veer, and Shanky. At SummerSlam on 21 August, McIntyre defeated Mahal with Veer and Shanky banned from ringside. As part of the 2021 Draft, McIntyre was drafted to the SmackDown brand. At Crown Jewel on 21 October, McIntyre faced Big E for the WWE Championship, but lost. On 21 November, at Survivor Series, McIntyre was the captain of Team SmackDown, but he was eliminated via countout and his team lost the match to Team Raw, with Seth Rollins being the sole survivor.

In December, McIntyre started feuding with Happy Corbin and Madcap Moss, defeating Moss at Day 1 on 1 January 2022. McIntyre participated in the Royal Rumble match at the namesake event on 29 January, but was the last competitor eliminated by eventual winner Brock Lesnar. At Elimination Chamber on 19 February, McIntyre defeated Moss again in a Falls Count Anywhere match. During the match, he performed an inverted Alabama Slam, which resulted in Moss landing directly on top of his head, but he was able to continue the match. On Night 1 of WrestleMania 38 on 2 April, McIntyre defeated Corbin and became the first person to kick out of his finisher, the End of Days, ending their feud.

On 29 July episode of SmackDown, McIntyre defeated Sheamus in a "Good Old Fashioned Donnybrook" match to become the number one contender for the Undisputed WWE Universal Championship at Clash at the Castle on 3 September. In the weeks leading up to the event, McIntyre was attacked by the returning Karrion Kross and his wife Scarlett. At Clash at the Castle, McIntyre failed to win the titles from Reigns after interference from the debuting Solo Sikoa. On 8 October, McIntyre lost to Kross in a strap match at Extreme Rules after interference from Scarlett. At Crown Jewel on 5 November, McIntyre defeated Kross in a steel cage match by escaping the cage despite another interference from Scarlett, ending their feud. Three weeks later at Survivor Series: WarGames on 26 November, McIntyre, along with The Brawling Brutes (Sheamus, Ridge Holland and Butch) and Kevin Owens lost to The Bloodline in a WarGames match.

At Royal Rumble on 28 January 2023, McIntyre entered the titular match at number 9, scoring four eliminations before being eliminated by Gunther. He would then challenge Gunther for the Intercontinental Championship on Night 2 of WrestleMania 39 on 2 April in a critically acclaimed triple threat match also involving Sheamus, which he lost after Gunther pinned him. As part of the 2023 Draft, McIntyre was drafted to the Raw brand. He returned at Money in the Bank on 1 July after a three-month hiatus, attacking Gunther following the latter's title defense over Matt Riddle. At SummerSlam on 5 August, McIntyre failed to win the Intercontinental Championship from Gunther.

==== World championship pursuits and reigns (2023–present) ====
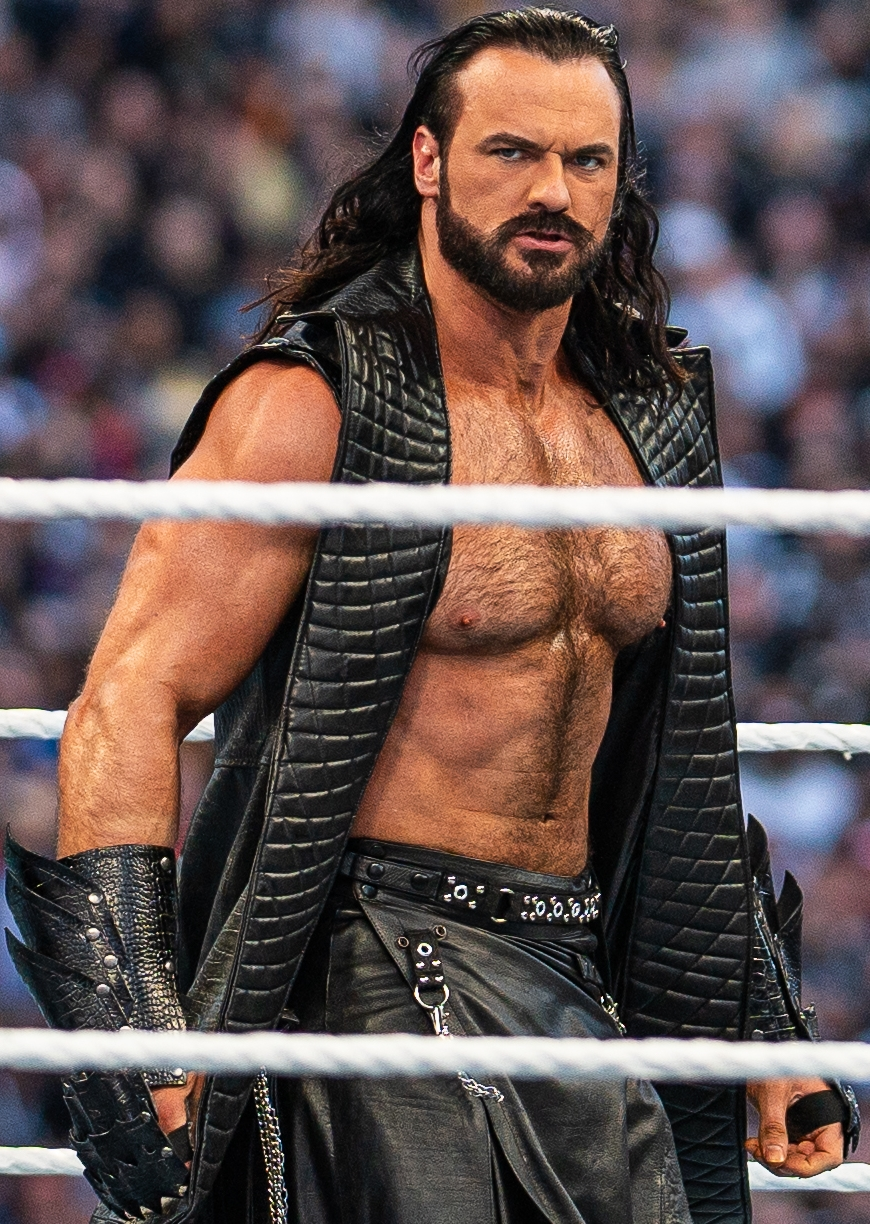
McIntyre at WrestleMania XL.

In September, McIntyre slowly transitioned into a tweener, showing a more aggressive attitude towards fighting for himself instead of others. He also refused to side with Cody Rhodes, Sami Zayn, and other faces on the roster accepting Jey Uso as a good standing member of the locker room after his actions as part of The Bloodline. At Crown Jewel on 4 November, McIntyre faced Seth "Freakin" Rollins for the World Heavyweight Championship in a losing effort. On 13 November episode of Raw, McIntyre turned heel for the first time since 2020 by helping The Judgment Day (Finn Bálor and Damian Priest) retain the Undisputed WWE Tag Team Championship against Rhodes and Uso. At Survivor Series: WarGames on 25 November, McIntyre and The Judgment Day lost to Rhodes, Rollins, Uso, Zayn and the returning Randy Orton in a WarGames match. McIntyre again failed to win the title from Rollins on 1 January at Day 1.

At Royal Rumble on 27 January 2024, during the Royal Rumble match, McIntyre legitimately injured CM Punk's triceps after a botched landing of his signature Future Shock DDT. The injury was turned into a storyline between the two, as McIntyre continuously mocked Punk for causing his injury. At Elimination Chamber: Perth on 24 February, McIntyre won the Elimination Chamber match by last eliminating Orton, earning another rematch against Rollins at WrestleMania XL. On Night 2 of WrestleMania XL on 7 April, McIntyre defeated Rollins to win the World Heavyweight Championship. After the match, Punk attacked McIntyre, allowing Damian Priest to cash in his Money in the Bank contract on McIntyre, ending his reign after only five minutes and forty-six seconds. He failed to regain the title from Priest at Clash at the Castle: Scotland on 15 June and Money in the Bank on 6 July after interference from Punk. (Note: At Money in the Bank, McIntyre won the Money in the Bank Ladder match and cashed-in the title shot that same night.) McIntyre and Punk then had a trilogy of matches, the first at SummerSlam on 3 August with Rollins as the special guest referee where McIntyre defeated Punk, the second at Bash in Berlin on 31 August where McIntyre lost in a strap match, and the third and final match at Bad Blood on 5 October, where McIntyre lost to Punk in a universally acclaimed Hell in a Cell match, ending their near ten-month trilogy feud.

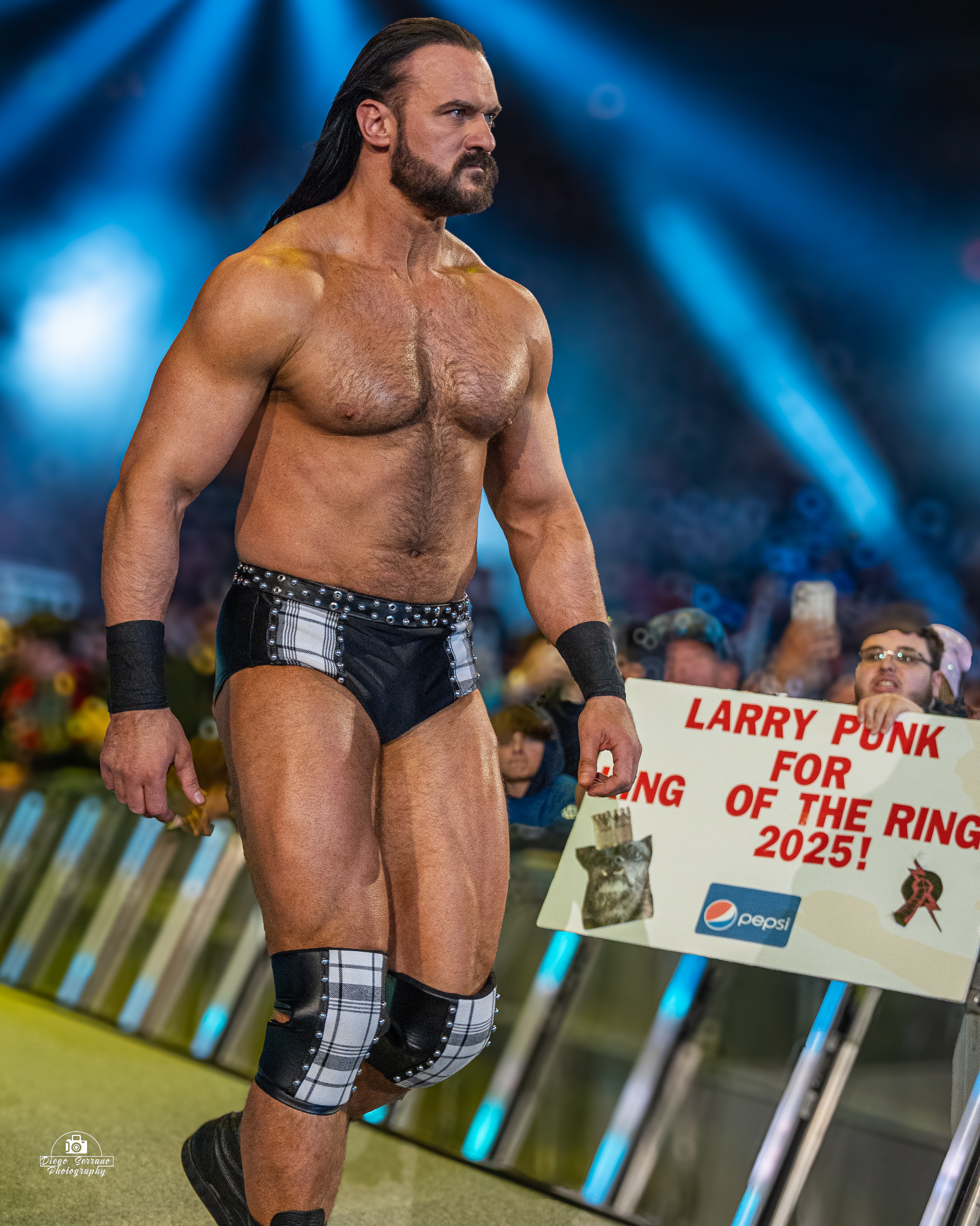
McIntyre making his entrance at the 2025 Royal Rumble.

In 2025, McIntyre started a feud with Damian Priest after Priest eliminated him at Royal Rumble, and Elimination Chamber: Toronto, leading to a match at WrestleMania 41, where McIntyre defeated Priest in a Sin City Street Fight. At Saturday Night's Main Event on 24 May, McIntyre and Priest faced off in a rematch contested as a Steel Cage match, which he lost when Priest escaped the cage ending their feud. Following a short hiatus, McIntyre returned on the 4 July episode of SmackDown, and feuded with Randy Orton, being defeated by him at Saturday Night's Main Event on 12 July, but defeating him and Jelly Roll on Night 1 of SummerSlam on 2 August with Logan Paul as his tag team partner.

McIntyre wrestled Cody Rhodes for the Undisputed WWE Championship at Wrestlepalooza on 20 September and Saturday Night's Main Event XLI on 1 November, but failed to win the title on both occasions. At Survivor Series: WarGames on 29 November, he teamed with Brock Lesnar, Logan Paul, and The Vision (Bron Breakker and Bronson Reed) to defeat Rhodes, Punk, Roman Reigns, and The Usos (Jey Uso and Jimmy Uso) in a WarGames match. McIntyre then faced Rhodes again for the title on 9 January 2026 episode of SmackDown in a Three Stages of Hell match where McIntyre defeated Rhodes, thanks to interference from Jacob Fatu, to win his third WWE Championship. On 31 January at Royal Rumble, he defeated Sami Zayn to retain the title, and later interfered in the namesake match to attack Rhodes, leading to his elimination. McIntyre also interfered and caused Rhodes to be eliminated from the Elimination Chamber match at the titular event on 28 February, thus preventing Rhodes from challenging him for the title at WrestleMania 42. However, due to McIntyre's constant interferences in Rhodes's attempts to earn a title match, SmackDown General Manager Nick Aldis scheduled McIntyre to defend the title against Rhodes on the 6 March episode of SmackDown, where McIntyre lost after interference from Fatu, ending his third reign at 56 days. The interference led to a match against Fatu at WrestleMania 42 Night 1, where McIntyre lost to Fatu, ending their feud. After WrestleMania, McIntyre took time off to film Highlander, The Last Druid, and an unknown project.

== Professional wrestling style and persona ==
McIntyre uses a running single leg dropkick called the Claymore as his finisher. The move was created accidentally during a match when McIntyre was attempting a big boot, but since the leather pants he was wearing were too tight, he had to kick up with the other leg to avoid ripping them, knocking himself out in the process. After the match, a road agent told him to figure out how to use the move again without killing himself. He began using a countdown upon the execution of the move during a house show, which stuck after fans participated in the countdown. McIntyre also uses a double underhook DDT called the Future Shock (originally called the Scot Drop), and a headbutt called the Glasgow Kiss.

In his early years on the independent circuit, he developed a narcissistic character and used "The One and Only" as his theme song. Shortly after his main roster debut in WWE, McIntyre was labeled "The Chosen One" by Vince McMahon, who believed he was a future world champion. His character took a more comedic turn upon joining the 3MB faction in 2012, as he continuously lost matches.

During his feud with CM Punk in 2024, McIntyre received a boost on social media for his "hater" mannerisms, using online platforms such as X to enhance his feuds and embracing the role of a "keyboard warrior" through online trolling and increased promo rate. His heel turn in the fall of 2023 has been praised for his interactions with several top stars within more layered storyline callbacks that have his character "speaking his truth" despite being the villain.

== Other media ==
=== Video games ===
Year	Title	Notes	Ref.
2010	WWE SmackDown vs. Raw 2011		
2011	WWE All Stars		
2011	WWE '12		
2012	WWE '13	Included in the "WWE Superstars" Pack as DLC	
2013	WWE 2K14		
2017	WWE 2K18	Included in the "NXT Generation" Pack as DLC	
2018	WWE 2K19		
2019	WWE 2K20		
2020	WWE 2K Battlegrounds		
2022	WWE 2K22		
2023	WWE 2K23		
2024	WWE 2K24		
2025	WWE 2K25		
2026	WWE 2K26		

=== Books ===
McIntyre's autobiography, A Chosen Destiny: My Story, was released on 4 May 2021.

=== Acting credits ===
McIntyre made his acting debut in the action comedy The Killer's Game alongside former WWE superstar Dave Bautista.

Year	Title	Role	Notes
2024	The Killer's Game	Rory Mackenzie	
2026	Hexed †	Moon Hype McInmoon	Voice role
2027	The Last Druid †	TBA	Post-production
TBA	Highlander †	Angus MacLeod	Post-production

== Personal life ==
Galloway became engaged to American professional wrestler Taryn Terrell in July 2009, while both working for WWE and they married in Las Vegas in May 2010. They divorced in May 2011. Galloway met doctor Kaitlyn Frohnapfel at a bar in 2013 and they married on 10 December 2016. They currently reside in Nashville, Tennessee, having previously lived in Tampa, Florida.

Galloway's mother, Angela, died on 3 November 2012, at the age of 51 after suffering from cerebellar ataxia.

Galloway is a supporter of Scottish football club Rangers F.C.

On 2 June 2023, Galloway announced that he had become an American citizen.

== Championships and accomplishments ==
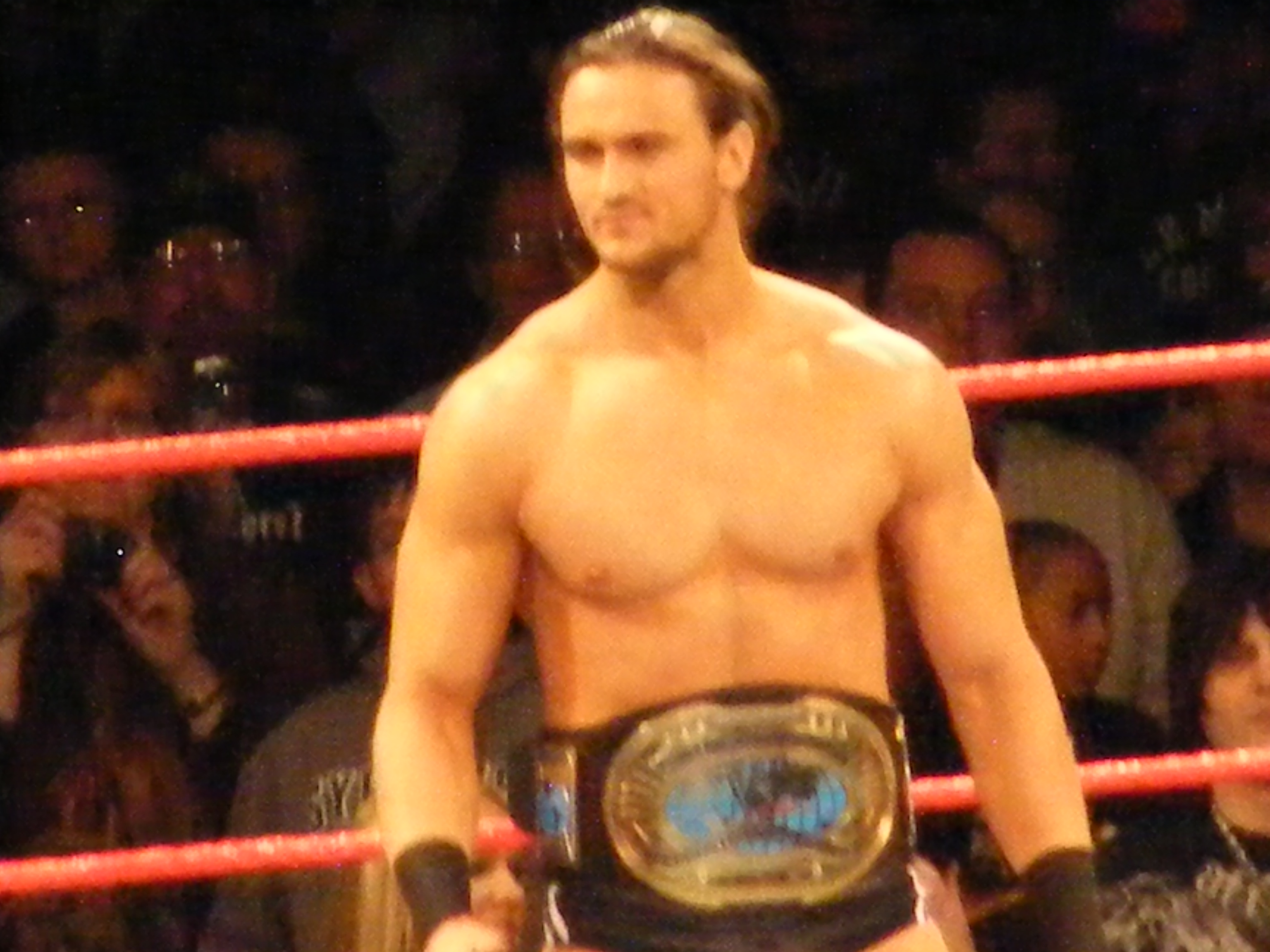
McIntyre's first championship in WWE was the WWE Intercontinental Championship, which he held once.

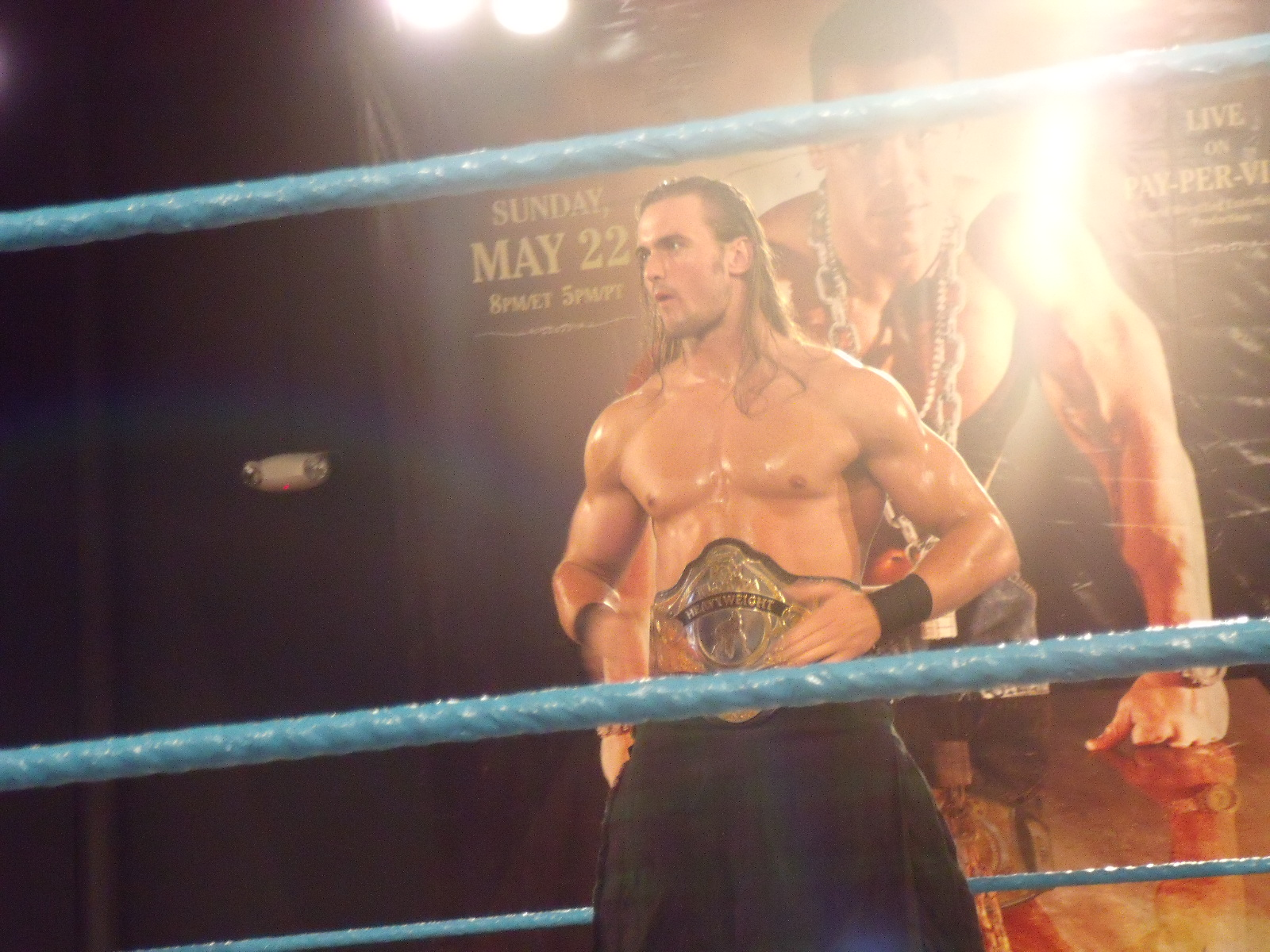
McIntyre also had success in WWE's developmental territory Florida Championship Wrestling, as he won the FCW Florida Heavyweight Championship once.

- British Championship Wrestling
  - BCW Heavyweight Championship (2 times)
- CBS Sports
  - Wrestler of the Year (2020)
- Dansk Pro Wrestling
  - DPW Heavyweight Championship (1 time)
- ESPN
  - Best Promo Artist (2024)
  - Feud of the Year (2024) – vs. CM Punk
- Evolve
  - Evolve Championship (1 time)
  - Evolve Tag Team Championship (2 times, inaugural) – with Johnny Gargano (1) and Dustin (1)
  - Evolve Tag Team Championship Tournament (2016) – with Johnny Gargano
  - Open the Freedom Gate Championship (1 time)
- Fighting Spirit Magazine
  - FSM Readers Award (1 time)
    - British Wrestler of the Year (2014)
  - Ranked No. 37 of the top 50 singles wrestlers in the FSM 50 in 2015
- Florida Championship Wrestling
  - FCW Florida Heavyweight Championship (1 time)
  - FCW Florida Tag Team Championship (2 times) – with Stu Sanders
- Insane Championship Wrestling
  - ICW World Heavyweight Championship (2 times, inaugural)
  - ICW Hall of Fame (2018)
  - ICW Award (4 times)
    - Moment of the Year (2014) – Surprise return at "Shug's Hoose Party"
    - Promo of the Year (2014) – "Shug's Hoose Party"
    - Feud of the Year (2016) – The Black Label vs. Insane Championship Wrestling
    - Best on the Mic (2016)
- Inside The Ropes Magazine
  - Ranked No. 1 of the top 50 wrestlers in the world in the ITR 50 in 2020.
- Irish Whip Wrestling
  - IWW International Heavyweight Championship (1 time)
- NoDQ.com
  - NoDQ End of Year Award (3 times)
    - Male Superstar of the Year (2020)
    - Babyface of the Year (2020)
    - Finisher of the Year (2020)
- Outback Championship Wrestling
  - OCW World Heavyweight Championship (1 time)
- Preston City Wrestling
  - There Can Be Only One Gauntlet (2016)
- Pro Wrestling Illustrated
  - Most Improved Wrestler of the Year (2020)
  - Feud of the Year (2024) – vs. CM Punk
  - Ranked No. 4 of the top 500 singles wrestlers in the PWI 500 in 2020 and 2021
- Scottish Wrestling Alliance
  - Scottish Heavyweight Championship (1 time)
- Sports Illustrated
  - Ranked No. 3 of the top 10 wrestlers in 2020
  - Feud of the Year (2024) – vs. CM Punk
  - Best on the Mic (2024)
- Total Nonstop Action Wrestling
  - TNA World Heavyweight Championship (1 time)
  - Impact Grand Championship (1 time)
  - Feast or Fired (2016 – World Heavyweight Championship contract)
  - Global Impact Tournament (2015) – with Team International (Magnus, The Great Muta, Tigre Uno, Bram, Rockstar Spud, Khoya, Sonjay Dutt and Angelina Love)
  - TNA Joker's Wild (2016)
- Union of European Wrestling Alliances
  - European Heavyweight Championship (1 time)
- What Culture Pro Wrestling
  - WCPW World Championship (1 time)
  - Defiant Wrestling Award for Match of the Year (2017) – vs. Will Ospreay at "Exit Wounds"
- Wrestling Observer Newsletter
  - Best on Interviews (2024)
  - Feud of the Year (2024) – vs. CM Punk
- WWE
  - Undisputed WWE Championship (3 times)
  - World Heavyweight Championship (1 time)
  - NXT Championship (1 time)
  - WWE Intercontinental Championship (1 time)
  - WWE (Raw) Tag Team Championship (2 times) – with Cody Rhodes (1) and Dolph Ziggler (1)
  - 31st Triple Crown Champion
  - Men's Royal Rumble (2020)
  - Men's Money in the Bank (2024)
  - Bumpy Award (2 times)
    - Superstar of the Half-Year (2020)
    - Lifetime Achievement Award (2021)
  - Slammy Award (6 times)
    - Superstar of the Year (2020)
    - Male Superstar of the Year (2020)
    - Social Star of the Year (2024)
    - Social Star of the Year (2025)
    - Rivalry of the Year (2025) – vs. CM Punk
    - Match of the Year (2025) – Hell in a Cell match vs. CM Punk at Bad Blood
  - RAW's Gold Medal of Excellence (2018)
  - Slim Jim Savage Moment of the Summer (2024, for stealing CM Punk's friendship bracelet and sending him to a local medical facility)

== Notes ==
B= Drew McIntyre is the first Scottish world heavyweight champion in the WWE
