= Adrian Chiarella =

Australian writer filmmaker

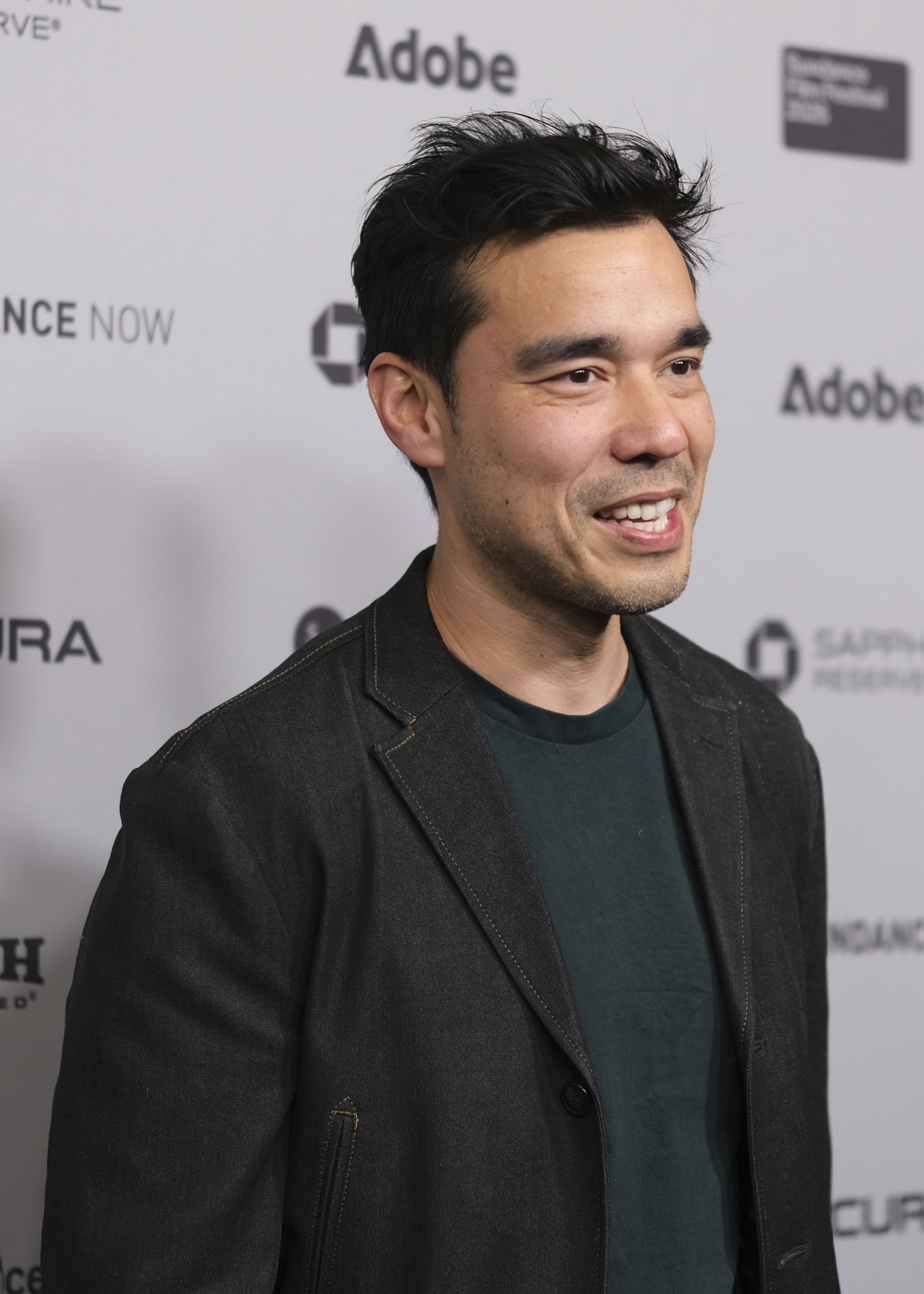
- Chiarella at the 2026 Sundance Film Festival
- Born: Sydney, Australia
- Education: Australian Film, Television and Radio School
- Occupations: Film director; screenwriter; film editor
- Known for: Leviticus; Dwarf Planet; Erotic Stories
- Awards: AWGIE Award; Australian Screen Editors Award

Adrian Chiarella is an Australian director and writer. He is known for his film Leviticus, a queer coming-of-age psychological horror. His prior works includes the "Walking Gambit" episode of Erotic Stories and acclaimed short film Dwarf Planet. Chiarella is a graduate of the Australian Film, Television and Radio School.

== Early life ==
Chiarella grew up in Sydney, Australia born to an Italian father and Chinese mother. He is a second-generation immigrant on his mother's side.

== Career ==
Chiarella attended the Australian Film, Television and Radio School (AFTRS), during which he completed an internship. He edited pre-visualization work for Baz Luhrmann's Australia. He also edited feature film Teenage Kicks by director Craig Boreham, and acclaimed short film The Love Song of Iskra Prufrock, for which he received an Australian Screen Editors Award for editing. He subsequently moved into directing, working on promotional campaigns for numerous Foxtel television series. He has also worked in development for showrunner Tony Ayres' production company, TAP.

His short films have screened at international film festivals to broad acclaim, earning him nominations and awards from the Australian Director's Guild, the Australian Academy of Cinema and Television (AACTA), and the Melbourne Queer Film Festival.

Chiarella wrote and directed the acclaimed short film Dwarf Planet, which screened at the 68th Sydney Film Festival and the Clermont-Ferrand International Short Film Festival in 2021.

In 2025, Chiarella won an AWGIE award for the episode of the SBS anthology series Erotic Stories he wrote, titled "Walking Gambit".

Chiarella has cited Hou Hsiao-Hsien, Wong Kar-wai, and Chen Kaige as film-making inspirations. Leviticus premiered at the 2026 Sundance Film Festival and was subsequently acquired for international distribution by Neon. He has been vocal about the importance of queer representation in cinema. Chiarella has also stated that casting for Leviticus drew on his admiration for the "bold, punk style" of 1993 crime comedy-drama Bad Boy Bubby; Nicholas Hope appears in Leviticus as the Deliverance Preacher. Other notable inspirations include cult classics A Tale of Two Sisters, It Follows, and Let The Right One In.

Chiarella is signed with Cameron's Management and WME.

== Personal life ==
Chiarella is a gay man.

== Filmography ==
=== Film ===
Year	Title	Credits	Notes
2014	Touch	Writer, Director	Short film
2018	Black Lips	Writer, Director	Short film
2020	Dwarf Planet	Writer, Director	Short film
2026	Leviticus	Writer, Director	Feature film

=== Television ===
Year	Title	Distributor	Credits	Notes
2023	Totally Completely Fine	Sundance Now	Director	Episode: "Not All Heroes Carry Vape"
2023	Erotic Stories	SBS	Writer	Episode: "Walking Gambit"
2023	Five Bedrooms	Paramount+	Director	2 episodes
