= Stacy Clausen =

Australian actor (born 2005)

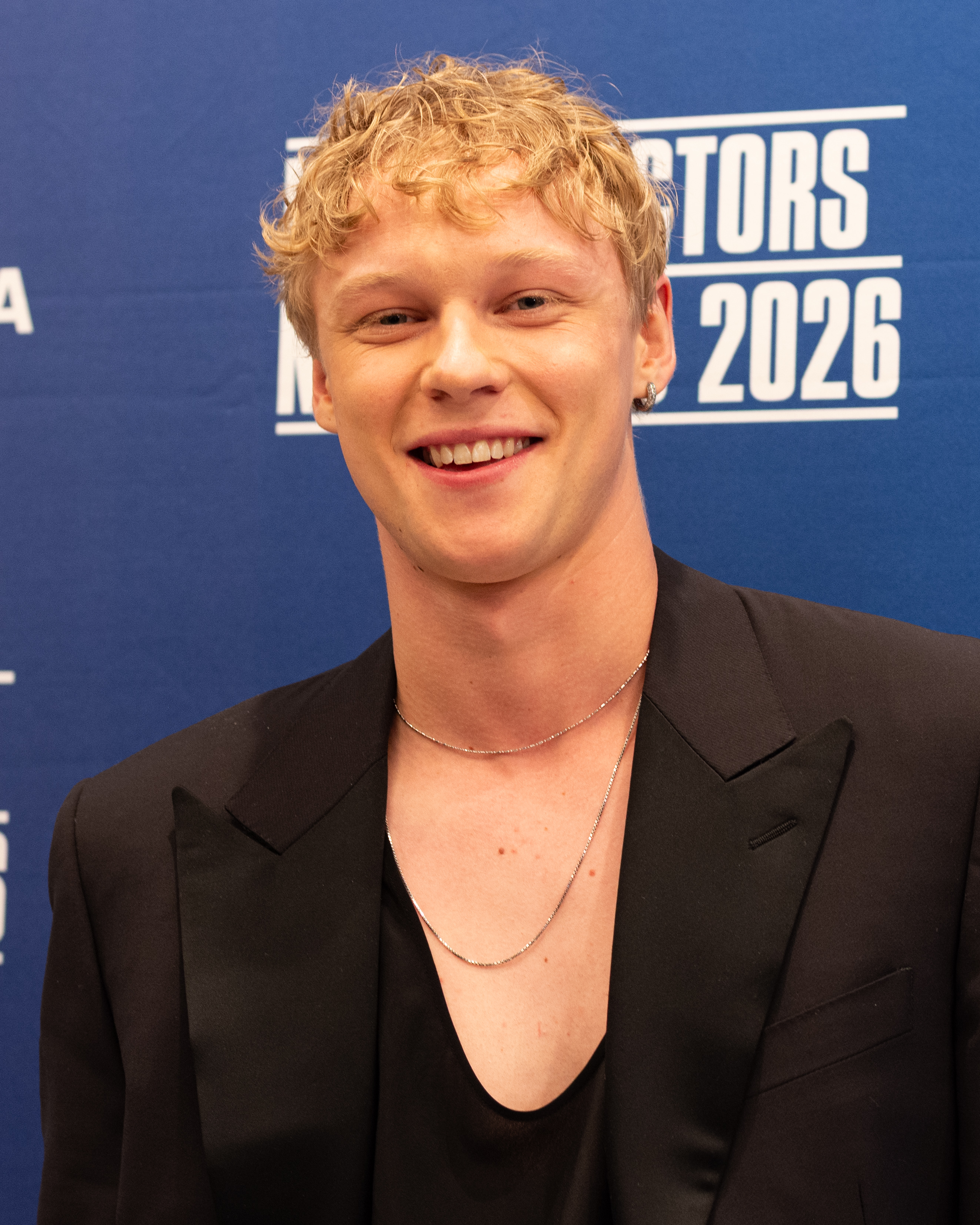
- Clausen in 2026
- Born: Stacy Austin Clausen; 25 April 2005 (age 21); High Wycombe, England
- Occupation: Actor
- Years active: 2019–present

Stacy Clausen (born 25 April 2005) is an Australian actor. He first gained recognition for portraying Mapplethorpe Landis in the comedy horror series Crazy Fun Park (2023). In 2026, he gained international recognition for his starring role as Ryan Whelan in the romantic supernatural horror film Leviticus. He appears in the war film The Mosquito Bowl (2026), and is set to appear in the films Wolf Creek: Legacy and The Last Druid (both 2027).

Clausen was a finalist for the Australian Academy of Cinema and Television Arts (AACTA) Young Stars Top 10 in 2024.

== Early life ==
Clausen was born on 25 April 2005 in High Wycombe, England. At two years old, he moved to Melbourne, Australia, where he was raised in the Kensington/Footscray area. He began taking after-school performing arts classes in preparatory school, which he continued throughout primary school. In 2019, he began training at Screen Actors Australia.

== Career ==
Clausen made his screen debut in 2019 with a minor guest role in the American television series Preacher, the first role for which he auditioned. In 2023, he landed his first leading role as Mapplethorpe Landis in the Australian comedy horror series Crazy Fun Park, which won the TV Week Logie Award for Most Outstanding Children's Program. He made his feature film debut that same year as Tom Watson in the Netflix biographical film True Spirit.

In 2024, Clausen joined the cast of the Australian mystery drama series High Country. That same year, he was selected as one of the AACTA Young Stars Top 10 in the inaugural Australian Academy of Cinema and Television Arts (AACTA) Young Stars National Youth Casting Call.

Clausen gained international recognition in 2026 for starring in the supernatural horror romance film Leviticus, which premiered at the 2026 Sundance Film Festival to critical acclaim. He portrayed Ryan Whelan, a gay teenager forced to undergo a supernatural conversion therapy ritual, as well as his doppelgänger. That same year, he appeared in the Netflix survival thriller film Thrash as Ron, a foster child who becomes trapped in a flood alongside his siblings.

== Filmography ==
=== Film ===
Key
†	Denotes films that have not yet been released

Year	Title	Role	Notes	Ref.
2023	True Spirit	Tom Watson		
2024	Pleasure	Thommy	Short film	
2026	Leviticus	Ryan Whelan		
2026	Thrash	Ron Olsen		
2026	The Mosquito Bowl	Avery		
2027	Wolf Creek: Legacy †	Justin Peterson	Post-production	
2027	The Last Druid †	TBA	Post-production	

=== Television ===
Year	Title	Role	Notes	Ref.
2019	Preacher	Disappointed Kid #2	Episode: "Fear of the Lord"	
2021	Fires	Jai Gordon	Episode #1.6	
2023	Crazy Fun Park	Mapplethorpe Landis	Main role	
2023	Scrublands	Allan Newkirk	Recurring role; 4 episodes	
2024–present	High Country	Finn McKenzie	Recurring role; 4 episodes	

== Awards and nominations ==
Year	Award	Category	Nominated work	Result	Ref.
2026	Fangoria Chainsaw Awards	Best Supporting Performance	Leviticus	Pending	
