= Talk to Me (2022 film) =

Film by Danny and Michael Philippou

- Theatrical release poster
- Directed by: Danny and Michael Philippou
- Written by: Danny Philippou; Bill Hinzman
- Produced by: Samantha Jennings; Kristina Ceyton
- Starring: Sophie Wilde; Alexandra Jensen; Joe Bird; Otis Dhanji; Miranda Otto; Zoe Terakes; Chris Alosio; Marcus Johnson; Alexandria Steffensen
- Cinematography: Aaron McLisky
- Edited by: Geoff Lamb
- Music by: Cornel Wilczek
- Production companies: Screen Australia; South Australian Film Corporation; Adelaide Film Festival Investment Fund; Head Gear Films; Metrol Technology; Bankside Films; Causeway Films
- Distributed by: Maslow Entertainment; Umbrella Entertainment; Ahi Films
- Release dates: 30 October 2022 (Adelaide Film Festival); 27 July 2023 (Australia)
- Running time: 95 minutes
- Country: Australia
- Language: English
- Budget: $4.5 million
- Box office: $92 million

Talk to Me is a 2022 Australian supernatural horror film directed by Danny and Michael Philippou in their feature directorial debuts and written by Danny Philippou and Bill Hinzman, based on a concept by Daley Pearson. It stars Sophie Wilde, Alexandra Jensen, Joe Bird, Otis Dhanji, Miranda Otto, Zoe Terakes, Chris Alosio, Marcus Johnson, and Alexandria Steffensen. The film follows a group of teenagers discovering they can contact spirits using a mysterious severed and embalmed hand.

Talk to Me premiered at the Adelaide Film Festival on 30 October 2022, and was released by Maslow Entertainment, Umbrella Entertainment, and Ahi Films in Australia on 27 July 2023 and by A24 in the United States the following day. The film received positive reviews from critics and grossed $92 million worldwide against a production budget of $4.5 million, becoming A24's then- highest-grossing horror film. At the 13th AACTA Awards, it won eight awards including the Best Film, the Philippou brothers won for Best Direction and Best Original Screenplay, and Wilde won for Best Actress.

== Plot ==
At a house party in Adelaide, Cole frantically searches for his brother, Duckett. When he finds Duckett and attempts to bring him home, Duckett stabs Cole and kills himself.

Sometime later, 17-year-old Mia is struggling with the anniversary of her mother Rhea's death from an accidental sleeping pill overdose and her distant relationship with her father Max. Mia, her best friend Jade, and Jade's little brother Riley sneak out to a gathering hosted by Hayley and Joss, where the main attraction is a severed embalmed hand along with lighting a candle. Holding the hand and saying "Talk to me" will summon a random deceased person's spirit, and saying "I let you in" immediately after allows the spirit to possess them. To prevent spirits from binding themselves to the hand holder, someone else must end the possession before 90 seconds by pulling away the embalmed hand and blowing out a candle. Mia volunteers to go first and is possessed by a spirit that displays a menacing focus on Riley. Joss and Hayley struggle to break the connection, and the time limit is slightly exceeded.

Mia describes the experience to Riley as euphoric. Mia joins Hayley, Joss, and Jade's boyfriend Daniel at Jade's house the next night. Everyone except Riley and his friend James takes several turns being possessed. Jade refuses to let Riley participate, but when Jade leaves the room and Riley insists, Mia lets him take a turn for 50 seconds. Riley appears to be possessed by the spirit of Rhea, who attempts to reconcile with Mia. Mia stops the group from ending the possession to keep talking to her mother. The spirits overtake Riley's body, and they make him violently attempt suicide by banging his head against the table and walls. He is hospitalized in critical condition.

Mia, now haunted by visions of her mother free of the hand, is blamed for Riley's injuries and shunned by Jade and her mother, Sue. Having secretly taken the embalmed hand, Mia offers to let Daniel stay at her father's house for the night. While platonically sharing a bed with Daniel, she witnesses a spirit appear and suck on Daniel's feet. When he wakes up, he instead sees Mia sucking his feet in a trance and leaves. Mia uses the hand to contact her mother, who insists that her death was accidental and that she needs to help Riley, who remains possessed and attempts suicide whenever he regains consciousness.

The friends track down Cole, who explains that a living body will naturally expel invading spirits over time. Mia, fearing that Riley may not have time, attempts to contact him in the hospital by using the hand but is instead shown a vision of Riley being tortured by spirits in a hellish purgatory. At home, Max reveals that Rhea had killed herself, reading her suicide letter out loud to Mia and apologizing for hiding the truth. Rhea's spirit tells Mia that Max is lying, and Mia hallucinates that she is being violently attacked by Max, causing her to stab the real Max inadvertently. Rhea tells Mia that Riley needs to die to be set free from his possession. Mia kidnaps Riley from the hospital, and Jade sees Mia pushing Riley in a wheelchair toward the busy highway. Rhea tells Mia to push Riley into the road, but when Rhea says "We'll have him forever", Mia suddenly releases the wheelchair as Jade runs at her; from the perspective of an approaching car, Mia falls on the road and is struck head-on.

Mia stands up in the road to find everyone not noticing her, then suddenly finds herself in the hospital hallway, where she sees a fully recovered Riley talking to Jade and Sue while Max leaves in an elevator. Nobody looks at her or talks to her. She has no reflection in the mirror, and her body remains disfigured from the accident. After becoming engulfed in darkness, she sees a hand extended over a candle in the distance. She grabs it and is suddenly summoned to a house party in Greece, where a partygoer holding her hand is urged to speak and tells Mia, "I let you in."

== Cast ==
- Sophie Wilde as Mia
- Alexandra Jensen as Jade, Mia's friend
- Joe Bird as Riley, Jade's younger brother
- Otis Dhanji as Daniel, Jade's boyfriend
- Miranda Otto as Sue, Jade's and Riley's mother
- Zoe Terakes as Hayley, a party host
- Chris Alosio as Joss, a party host
- Marcus Johnson as Max, Mia's father
- Alexandria Steffensen as Rhea, Mia's mother
- Sunny Johnson as Duckett
- Ari McCarthy as Cole, Duckett's brother
- Jacek Koman as Burke Spirit

== Production ==
Talk to Me is a co-production of Causeway Films, Bankside Films, and Talk to Me Holdings, and is a presentation of Screen Australia in association with the South Australian Film Corporation, Adelaide Film Festival Investment Fund, Head Gear Films, and Metrol Technology. Directors Danny and Michael Philippou worked closely with producer Samantha Jennings, one of the co-founders of production company Causeway Films, who is familiar with Adelaide. They knew her from working with her on The Babadook (2014), another Causeway Films production, and credit her with keeping them grounded and helping to shape the film.

== Release ==
Talk to Me sold to numerous international distributors at the 2022 Cannes Film Festival. It had its debut in a preview screening at the Adelaide Film Festival on 30 October 2022, the closing night of the festival.

The film had its international premiere at the 2023 Sundance Film Festival in its midnight lineup. A24 acquired the rights to distribute the film in the United States. Maslow Entertainment, Umbrella Entertainment, and Ahi Films were confirmed to be co-distributing the film in Australia and New Zealand.

The film had its European premiere at the Berlin International Film Festival and also screened in the United States at South by Southwest (SXSW) that same year. The film also had its Canadian premiere at the Fantasia International Film Festival on 23 July 2023.

Talk to Me was theatrically released in Australia on 27 July 2023, before releasing on the following day in the United States and Canada, the United Kingdom and internationally. In Kuwait, however, the film was banned from the theatrical release, reportedly for featuring a non-binary and transgender actor, Zoe Terakes. The reports came despite the fact that the film was screening in other parts of the conservative Gulf region. Terakes expressed their disappointment about the news on social media. On 9 August, the Kuwaiti authority formally announced the ban of both Talk to Me and American comedy film Barbie (which has an underlying feminist theme, as well as a transgender actress), claiming that it was to protect "public ethics and social traditions".

As part of a partnership between A24 and IMAX, the film re-released exclusively in IMAX theaters for one night only on 22 January 2025.

=== Home media ===
Talk to Me was released on DVD, Blu-ray and Ultra HD Blu-ray in the United States on 3 October 2023 by Lionsgate Home Entertainment, and in Australia on 25 October 2023.

== Reception ==
=== Box office ===
Talk to Me grossed $48.3 million in the United States and Canada, and $43.9 million in other countries and territories, for a worldwide total of $92.2 million.

In the United States and Canada, Talk to Me was released alongside Haunted Mansion, and was originally projected to gross $4–5 million from 2,340 theaters in its opening weekend. After making $4.2 million on its first day (including $1.3 million from Thursday night previews), weekend estimates were increased to $10 million. It ended up debuting to $10.4 million and finished in fifth, marking the best start for an A24 film since Midsommar in July 2019. The film made $6.3 million in its second weekend (a drop of 40%, better than average for a horror film). The film remained in the top 10 over its first six weeks, and on September 3 surpassed Hereditary as A24's highest-grossing horror film domestically with a running total of $44.5 million.

=== Critical response ===
On the review aggregator website Rotten Tomatoes, 94% of 293 critics' reviews are positive, with an average rating of 7.7/10. The website's consensus reads: "With a gripping story and impressive practical effects, Talk to Me spins a terrifically creepy 21st-century horror yarn built on classic foundations." Metacritic, which uses a weighted average, assigned the film a score of 76 out of 100, based on 44 critics, indicating "generally favorable" reviews. Audiences polled by CinemaScore gave the film an average grade of "B+" on an A+ to F scale.

Jeannette Catsoulis of The New York Times wrote, "Distinguished by wonderfully gooey practical effects and deeply distressing visual jolts (especially when young Riley falls under the hand's malignant influence), Talk to Me has a hurtling energy that's often violent but never purposefully cruel." She also applauded Wilde and Bird's performances, saying the film "owes much of its potency to Sophie Wilde's continually evolving lead performance" and "a remarkable Joe Bird." Justin Chang of the Los Angeles Times also praised Bird and Wilde's performances, writing, "Joe Bird, in a superb and surprising performance," and, "But even when Talk to Me flirts with incoherence, Wilde pulls it back from the brink. More than just a great scream queen, she makes vivid sense of Mia's ravaged emotions, revealing her to be a captive less to the spirit realm than to her own inconsolable grief."

Jake Wilson of The Sydney Morning Herald gave the film 3½ out of 4 stars, writing, "The grim prologue leaves little doubt that horrible things are going to happen to people we're asked to care about – and while the ending may not fully satisfy the emotional expectations that have been built up, better too few comforting explanations than too many." Peter Howell of the Toronto Star gave the film three out of four stars, saying the story had "shaky logic" but also "a rock-solid sense of instilling dread with a minimum of special effects and a sound design that turns the chill up to 11." David Rooney of The Hollywood Reporter praised the film, saying that it "deftly stitches its deepest fears around the idea that grief and trauma can be open invitations to predatory forces from the great beyond. It marks a welcome splash of new blood on the horror landscape." Rooney also applauded the performances, writing, "While the predominantly young cast is solid, especially Bird as Riley, talented newcomer Wilde does the heaviest dramatic lifting."

In a more mixed review, Dennis Harvey of Variety called the film "A somewhat mixed bag, as the script doesn’t fully ballast the serious tenor, this is nonetheless a confidently crafted effort with enough intriguing elements to keep viewers involved, if not particularly scared." More critically, Matthew Mongale of The Austin Chronicle stated, "Trauma has become a catch-all shorthand for many horror filmmakers, and as much as the Philippous prove their worth as horror directors, as writers the relationship between two families bonded by trauma proves too complex for them to bring home."

An IndieWire reviewer listed it as one of the "25 Scariest Movies on Netflix" in 2025, calling it "one of the most purely fun horror films to come out in quite some time" and "a new horror classic." In July 2025, The Hollywood Reporter ranked the film at number 24 on its list of the "25 Best Horror Movies of the 21st Century."

== Accolades ==
Award	Date of Ceremony	Category	Recipient(s)	Result	Ref.
Washington D.C. Area Film Critics Association Awards	10 December 2023	Best Youth Performance	Joe Bird	Nominated	
Las Vegas Film Critics Society	13 December 2023	Best Horror/Sci-FI Movie	Talk to Me	Nominated	
St. Louis Film Critics Association	17 December 2023	Best Horror Film	Talk to Me	Won	
San Diego Film Critics Society Awards	19 December 2023	Best First Feature	Danny and Michael Philippou	Nominated	
San Diego Film Critics Society Awards	19 December 2023	Best Youth Performance	Joe Bird	Nominated	
Phoenix Critics Circle Awards	23 December 2023	Best Horror Film	Talk to Me	Won	
Astra Film and Creative Arts Awards	6 January 2024	Best Horror Feature	Talk to Me	Nominated	
Austin Film Critics Association Awards	10 January 2024	Best First Film	Danny Philippou and Michael Philippou	Nominated	
Denver Film Critics Society	12 January 2024	Best Sci-Fi/Horror	Talk to Me	Nominated	
Black Reel Awards	16 January 2024	Outstanding Lead Performance	Sophie Wilde	Nominated	
Saturn Awards	4 February 2024	Best Horror Film	Talk to Me	Won	
Saturn Awards	4 February 2024	Best Film Direction	Danny and Michael Philippou	Nominated	
Saturn Awards	4 February 2024	Best Supporting Actress in a Film	Sophie Wilde	Nominated	
AACTA Awards	10 February 2024	Best Film	Samantha Jennings, Kristina Ceyton	Won	
AACTA Awards	10 February 2024	Best Direction	Danny Philippou and Michael Philippou	Won	
AACTA Awards	10 February 2024	Best Screenplay in Film	Danny Philippou and Bill Hinzman	Won	
AACTA Awards	10 February 2024	Best Lead Actress	Sophie Wilde	Won	
AACTA Awards	10 February 2024	Best Supporting Actor	Zoe Terakes	Nominated	
AACTA Awards	10 February 2024	Best Supporting Actress	Alex Jensen	Nominated	
AACTA Awards	10 February 2024	Best Cinematography	Aaron McLisky	Nominated	
AACTA Awards	10 February 2024	Best Editing	Geoff Lamb	Won	
AACTA Awards	10 February 2024	Best Original Music Score	Cornel Wilczek	Won	
AACTA Awards	10 February 2024	Best Sound	Emma Bortignon, Pete Smith, Nick Steele	Won	
AACTA Awards	10 February 2024	Best Hair and Makeup	Rebecca Buratto, Paul Katte, Nick Nicolaou	Won	
Australian Film Critics Association Awards	26 March 2024	Best Film	Samantha Jennings, Kristina Ceyton	Nominated	
Australian Film Critics Association Awards	26 March 2024	Best Director	Danny and Michael Philippou	Nominated	
Australian Film Critics Association Awards	26 March 2024	Best Actress	Sophie Wilde	Won	
Australian Film Critics Association Awards	26 March 2024	Best Supporting Actor	Joe Bird	Nominated	
Australian Film Critics Association Awards	26 March 2024	Best Supporting Actress	Miranda Otto	Nominated	
Australian Film Critics Association Awards	26 March 2024	Best Screenplay	Danny Philippou & Bill Hinzman	Nominated	
Australian Film Critics Association Awards	26 March 2024	Best Cinematography	Aaron McLisky	Nominated	
Critics' Choice Super Awards	4 April 2024	Best Horror Movie	Talk to Me	Won	
Critics' Choice Super Awards	4 April 2024	Best Actress in a Horror Movie	Sophie Wilde	Won	

== Future ==
=== Prequel ===
In August 2023, Danny and Michael Philippou said they had finished shooting a prequel short film, with the story exploring Duckett's backstory which leads into the character's introduction in the original movie. Production was completed consecutively, from the perspective of screenlife storytelling through mobile phones and social media. Sunny Johnson features as Duckett. The filmmakers stated that they intend to release this project in the future. Later that month, the filmmakers revealed that sequences from the project were released by anonymously uploading them online as a means of marketing for Talk to Me. These sequences were removed from the internet due to complaints and concerns about their content. The sequences will be officially released at a future date.

=== Sequel ===
In August 2023, the Philippous confirmed plans to develop a sequel, stating that they had already written sequences for the project and even left Easter eggs in the first film alluding to said ideas. Later that month, A24 announced that a sequel titled Talk 2 Me was in development, with the studio releasing the sequel's official logo at that same time. Danny and Michael Philippou will return as co-directors, from a script written by returning writers Danny and Bill Hinzman.

=== Virtual reality series ===
In October 2025, a virtual reality 6-episode series based on the Talk to Me universe was announced, with Darren Brandl and Trent Atherton as the show creators. Craig William Macneill directed all of the episodes, from screenplays from Atherton. In February 2026, Aubri Ibrag, Charlotte Maggi, Sofia Hublitz, Julio Peña, Raff Law, and Charlie Hiscock were announced as part of the cast, before filming commenced that month. In October 2026, the title was revealed to be I Let You In. The series completed production in 2026, before its debut on Meta Platforms, in 2027.
