= Gay exorcism =

Exorcism intended to "expel" homosexuality from an individual

Gay exorcisms, similar to demonic exorcisms, are where an exorcist evicts "homosexual demons" or other spiritual entities from an LGBTQ individual. These exorcisms are intended to remove homosexuality from an individual. Reports of these exorcisms still occur in modern times, but are usually kept secret within the church.

Gay exorcism is a world-wide subcategory of conversion therapy, and has no scientific evidence of being effective, often causing more long-term harm to patients.

== Modern Perspectives ==
Exorcisms allow demons to be assigned to individuals as a cause for their thoughts and actions rather than their own autonomy. Demonic possession can then be diagnosed for any part of somebody that feels wrong to them, and some religious people accept it as a way of placing their conflict. Those opposed to this claim that accepting possession as a diagnosis is dangerous as it deflects responsibility and leaves people vulnerable without their autonomy. Researchers believe that the number of people who believe in demonic possession is growing.

Religious leaders have made a shift towards using medical terminology and practices when diagnosing and performing exorcisms to conform to more modern standards.

Many modern people are intrigued by exorcisms in general due to supernatural fascination and pop-culture inclusions, such as The Exorcist, rather than real cases.

== Cases ==
United States

Rev. Dr. Roland Stringfellow, a minister in California, said he had been subjected to anti-gay exorcism himself in the 1990s, which “caused nothing but shame and embarrassment”.

In 2009 a case in Connecticut was recorded on video. A 16-year-old boy was beaten in a church for 20 minutes by a group of church leaders acting as exorcists shouting "sacraments" such as, "Pray out the gay!", and "Foul Queer, be not here!" The video was later released on YouTube. The church refutes accountability or wrongdoing.

=== England ===
In 2022, the Church of England launched a formal investigation into allegations that Matthew Drapper, a gay man, was subjected to an exorcism at St Thomas Philadelphia Church in Sheffield in 2014. Drapper stated he was told to repeatedly shout prayers to expel "homosexual demons" during a 20-minute session that left him "cramping up and struggling to breathe." A Church of England inquiry confirmed the prayer session was "a form of exorcism."

In July 2025, St Thomas Philadelphia reached an out-of-court settlement with Drapper, including a five-figure compensation payment — believed to be the first legal settlement of its kind in the United Kingdom. The church also took accountability and apologized to Drapper.

In a separate case, a man in Warrington reported being pushed to the floor with a large Bible on his head and forced into an "exorcism" as part of gay conversion therapy at a local church.

=== Indonesia ===
In Indonesia, faith-based exorcisms known as ruqyah are used as a form of gay conversion therapy. Practitioners read verses of the Quran to participants while believing that homosexuality is caused by possession by malevolent spirits known as djinn. One practitioner described striking patients on their back with a broomstick as part of the procedure. An Indonesian television programme named Ruqyah broadcast such rituals, including one performed on an allegedly gay man.

In 2019, police in Padang arrested 18 same-sex couples and forced them to undergo conversion exorcisms.

=== Scotland ===
In 2024, as the Scottish government sought to ban conversion therapy, the Forward in Faith Church International — a group that practises gay exorcism — was reported to be seeking charity status in Scotland. The National Secular Society raised the alarm, noting the group believes in conducting exorcisms to "deliver gay men from the homosexual spirit."

=== Botswana ===
In 2024, the Botswana Network on Ethics, Law and HIV/AIDS (BONELA) publicly called on Pentecostal churches to stop performing exorcisms on LGBTQ+ people, describing the practice as "inhuman and barbaric" and warning of its potential to cause serious psychological harm.

=== Jamaica ===
Marlon James explains his struggle towards his homosexuality due to religious beliefs and his choice to undergo gay exorcism in a Jamaican Pentecostal church. The exorcism attempted emotional change but did not work and James found leaving the religion and accepting his sexuality gave him more of an internal cure.

=== Pakistan ===
In 2021 a man named Tineenullah Fahad in Pakistan gave a statement to VICE World News claiming to have successfully exorcised demons from 500 gay people through his clinic. Fahad uses multiple methods including physical violence. One of his patients gave a statement saying the treatments have worked to open his mind to heterosexuality, but he is still homosexual as well.

A Pakistani psychologist named Salmaan Tahir shares experience with patients of gay exorcisms and says that many face extreme physical and emotional violence.

=== Cameroon ===
A 22 year old unnamed Cameroonian man experienced a gay exorcism after his relationship was exposed to his village leaders. The leaders performed rituals and dances to remove the gay demons. The man was unchanged in his sexuality and left the village for a more accepting environment.

== See also ==
- Christianity and homosexuality
- Conversion therapy
- Exorcism
- Ex-gay
