= Noam Dar =

Israeli and Scottish professional wrestler (born 1993)

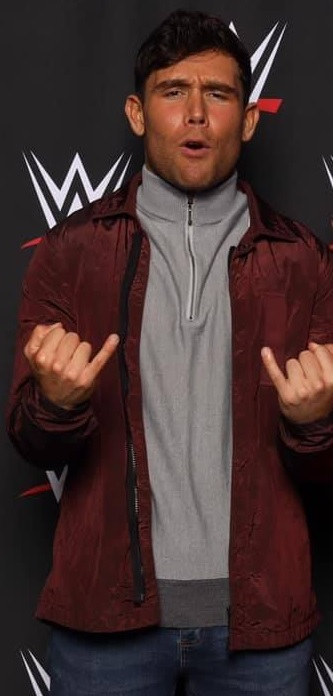
- Dar in 2017

Personal information
- Born: 28 July 1993 (age 33) Be'er Ya'akov, Israel

Professional wrestling career
- Ring name: Noam Dar
- Billed height: 5 ft 9 in (175 cm)
- Billed weight: 178 lb (81 kg)
- Billed from: Ayr, Scotland
- Trained by: Colin McKay; Kid Fite; Lionheart
- Debut: 2008

Noam Dar (Hebrew: נועם דר; born 28 July 1993) is an Israeli and Scottish professional wrestler. He is signed to WWE, where he performs on the NXT brand and is a record-setting four-time NXT Heritage Cup Champion. He is currently a mentor and tag team partner of Romeo Moreno.

Dar first wrestled for WWE in the 2016 Cruiserweight Classic, and is the first wrestler of Israeli origin to perform for the company. He has also worked for Total Nonstop Action Wrestling (TNA) and on its British Boot Camp series, as well as Insane Championship Wrestling (ICW), Progress Wrestling, Preston City Wrestling (PCW), Dragon Gate UK (DGUK), Revolution Pro Wrestling (RPW), Westside Xtreme Wrestling (wXw), Global Force Wrestling (GFW), and Ring of Honor (ROH). He's a two-time ICW 0-G Champion, a one-time PCW Cruiserweight Champion, and a one-time ICW World Heavyweight Champion, among other championships and accomplishments.

== Early life ==
Noam Dar was born in Be'er Ya'akov, Israel on 28 July 1993. He moved with his family to Scotland at the age of five and settled in Ayr, where he became a supporter of Glasgow-based Scottish Premiership football club Rangers and a fan of English rock band Oasis, the latter of which inspired a large part of his wrestling gimmick.

== Professional wrestling career ==
=== Independent circuit (2008–2016) ===
Dar debuted on the British independent circuit at the age of 15, working for Scottish promotions such as British Championship Wrestling and Premiere British Wrestling. Dar would get his first international experience wrestling in Spain for Dragon Gate's "European Invasion" and Zero1 Spain, with winning efforts over Colin McKaye and Sean South, respectively.

On 1 May 2011, Dar captured his first championship by becoming one half of the Premier British Wrestling (PBW) Tag Team Champions with Liam Thomson, holding the titles for over 11 months, with six title defenses, before losing them to the team of Lionheart and Wolfgang.

Dar entered a tournament to become the One Pro Wrestling 1PW World Heavyweight Champion in February 2011; he was unsuccessful but later that year went on to become the final 1PW Openweight Champion, winning the vacant title in a four-way match with Marty Scurll, Kris Travis and Joey Hayes and successfully defending it against Bad Bones and Kid Kash at 1PW's final show.

In October 2011, Dar worked a dark match for Dragon Gate UK's "Yosuka vs Shingo 3" event, in a winning effort against Daniel Robert.

Dar finished 2011 with another trip overseas, scoring a win over MK McKinnan for Westside Xtreme Wrestling (wXw), which qualified him to return in 2012 to compete in a series of matches at the wXw 16 Carat Gold 2012 shows.

In 2011, Dar began working higher profile matches, challenging multiple times for the BCW Heavyweight and Openweight Championships, albeit unsuccessfully and wrestling bigger name opponents such as Eddie Edwards for IPW, continuing the feud into 2012. For the Revolution Pro Wrestling promotion, Dar wrestled Jerry Lynn and challenged Prince Devitt for the RPW Cruiserweight Championship. Dar entered the SWE Speed King Championship tournament, qualifying for the finals with a win over Spud but failing to capture the championship. Dar competed unsuccessfully in two tournaments for IPW, losing to Sami Callihan in a Quarter Finals match for the IPW:UK Cruiserweight Championship and a first round loss to Zack Sabre Jr. in a tournament to crown the first British National Champion.

In April 2012, Dar began competing for Lionheart's Pro Wrestling Elite promotion, debuting with a win over Mark Haskins, before a loss to AJ Styles. Dar was entered into a tournament to crown a PWE World Heavyweight Champion, defeating El Ligero and Mikey Whiplash before losing to Andy Wild in the finals.

Dar captured the PBW "King of Cruisers 2012" crown in a six-way match to finish a successful year in the promotion.

2013 saw Dar return to Dragon Gate UK, working a series of matches against Yamato, Jimmy Susumu and Masaaki Mochizuki.

RPW invited Dar back for a run of shows which saw him defeat Mark Andrews in his return, but lose contests to Michael Elgin and Marty Scurll.

Dar ended 2013 by finally capturing the BCW Openweight Championship from Andy Wild, Dar would hold the championship for well over a year before losing it to Kenny Williams in April 2015. Dar was granted a rematch for the title against Williams in a triple threat also involving Will Ospreay but Williams retained.

Between 2014 and 2015, Dar had a three match feud with Grado over the PWE World Heavyweight Championship, where Dar first scored a disqualification victory, in a subsequent rematch they wrestled to a no-contest before Grado was finally victorious in a third defense, ending their feud. During this period, Dar also scored a notable win over Christopher Daniels.

In late 2015, Dar debuted for Global Force Wrestling (GFW), defeating Chris Ridgeway.

As a result of winning PWE's "Elite Rumble", Dar received another shot at the PWE World Heavyweight Championship. Dar succeeded in dethroning Iestyn Rees for the title on 23 July 2016 at PWE's "Five Year Anniversary: Dar Wars – The Final Episode" Show.

=== Insane Championship Wrestling (2010–2016, 2019–2021) ===
Dar debuted in Insane Championship Wrestling (ICW) with a win over The Highlander before winning a tournament to become the inaugural ICW Zero-G Champion. Dar held the title for 266 days (the longest reign in the title's history) before losing it to Lionheart. Dar won the championship back less than two months later to become the first two-time ICW Zero-G Champion. Dar's second reign would last 252 days, where he was defeated by Andy Wild.

In 2012, Dar would challenge unsuccessfully for both the ICW Tag Team Titles and ICW Heavyweight Championship.

From 2013 to 2015, Dar would continue his pursuit of championships in ICW, he challenged subsequent champions Mark Coffey, Wolfgang, Kenny Williams, and Stevie Boy unsuccessfully to regain the ICW Zero-G Championship and began teaming with Kenny Williams as Champagne Superbollocks to challenge Polo Promotions for the ICW Tag Team Championships on two occasions, one (swiftly interrupted) no-contest and one loss. However, following a Best of Five series with Joe Coffey where Dar was bested 3-2 and a lengthy feud with ICW authority figure Red Lightning, Dar would end 2015 on a high in ICW by defeating Joe Hendry in an ICW World Heavyweight Championship No.1 Contender match and gaining a win over former two-time champion Drew Galloway.

Dar remained prominent in ICW throughout 2016, entering the 30-man Square Go! match and challenging for the Zero-G Championship in addition to wins over Doug Williams, Sha Samuels and Liam Thomson. Dar was in one of the three main-events of ICW's debut iPPV Shug's Hoose Party 3 teaming with Sha Samuels and Grado as "Team Mark Dallas" to defeat The Black Label (Drew Galloway, Jack Jester and Wolfgang), thus restoring 50% of ICW ownership to Mark Dallas.

Due to signing with WWE, Dar's final ICW match was against Andy Wild on 11 September 2016. Dar lost before giving a farewell speech and receiving an ovation from the crowd and ICW roster.

Dar returned to ICW for one night only on 29 July 2017 for Shug's Hoose Party 4, Night One, tagging with Sha Samuels in a winning effort against Joe Coffey and Bram.

On 11 November 2018, it was announced Dar would make a further appearance at ICW Fear and Loathing XI, teaming with Wolfgang and BT Gunn against British Strong Style. Dar returned to ICW on Night Two of Fear & Loathing XII, and defeated Kieran Kelly & Leyton Buzzard in a triple threat match. After said match, Dar was interviewed and announced that he will be returning to ICW on a full-time basis, along with competing on NXT UK, due to WWE's Global Expansion and partnership with ICW. In the main event of ICW's 9th Annual Square Go! Event, Noam Dar defeated Stevie Xavier to capture the ICW World Heavyweight Title for the first time, something he never managed to do in his first stint with the promotion. Dar is the first ICW World Heavyweight Champion of non-British descent, being born in Israel to an Israeli father.

After prolonged inactivity as champion due to COVID-19 and his WWE contract limitations, Dar was forced to vacate the ICW World Heavyweight Championship, ending his reign at 583 days.

=== Preston City Wrestling (2011–2016) ===
Dar debuted in Preston City Wrestling (PCW) in 2011, fighting his way to finals of a tournament to crown the first PCW Heavyweight Champion before being bested by T-Bone. However, Dar would remain in title contention and in 2012 he became the inaugural PCW Cruiserweight Champion, holding the championship for 168 days before losing the title to Dave Rayne in 2013.

Dar bounced back into title contention by winning the 2013 "Road to Glory" tournament, with wins over CJ Banks, Brian Kendrick and Joey Hayes. The tournament win earned him another shot at the PCW Heavyweight Championship. Cashing in his title opportunity, he wrestled champion Doug Williams to a time-limit draw, before challenging later champion Lionheart in a losing effort. Dar rounded up 2013 with a loss to Doug Williams, a victory over Johnny Gargano and a Tag Team loss to both Williams and Lionheart where Dar was teamed with Uhaa Nation.

Following the championship loss, Dar would remain a prominent figure in PCW in 2014 and 2015, wrestling established names like Paul London, Steve Corino, Chris Hero, Tommaso Ciampa, John Morrison and Rob Van Dam. Dar had a violent three match feud with former WWE star Drew Galloway, which Dar won 2:1.

Due to a working relationship between PCW and Ring of Honor (ROH), Dar has competed on a number of ROH/PCW "Supershows", wrestling the likes of Cedric Alexander, Adam Cole, Roderick Strong, Bobby Fish and A. C. H. – as well as challenging Jay Lethal for the ROH World Championship.

Dar entered the 2016 "Road to Glory" tournament, eliminating Timothy Thatcher and El Ligero but eliminated in the semi-finals by Drew Galloway. In March 2016, Dar wrestled Jeff Jarrett in a losing effort for the PCW vs GFW "Global Conflict" show. Dar would begin a climb up the card following this loss, with wins over Phillip Michaels, John Morrison and PCW Heavyweight Champion Sha Samuels, in a match originally billed as a championship contest, reversed to a non-title match by GM Joanna Rose following his victory.

Dar was a surprise addition to the main-event of "Tribute to the Troops 3" iPPV on 25 June 2016, defeating Drew Galloway and Sha Samuels to win the PCW Heavyweight Championship. He retained the title twice in one night on 6 August 2016 at the "Fifth Anniversary" iPPV, defeating Samuels in a rematch and "Road to Glory" 2016 winner and current PCW Tag Team Champion Rampage Brown, respectively. Dar again retained the PCW Heavyweight Championship on 3 September 2016 at PCW "Collision Course".

=== Progress Wrestling (2012–2015) ===
Dar competed at the first Progress Wrestling show in 2012, entering a tournament to become the inaugural Progress Champion, he was unsuccessful in the tournament but then began a winning streak that would last the remainder of the year and continue into 2013 when he became the No.1 Contender to Progress Championship with a win over Dave Mastiff, but Dar was unable to unseat El Ligero for the title.

In 2014, Dar entered and won the first Progress World Cup tournament; representing Israel he defeated Darrell Allen (Jamaica), Grado (Scotland) and Rampage Brown (England). The tournament win earned him another shot at the Progress Championship against Jimmy Havoc. During the match, he made Havoc tap out but as the referee was knocked out at the time the decision didn't count and Havoc eventually won.

In 2015, at Chapter 18 Dar again challenged Havoc for the championship in a six-way elimination match. Dar eliminated Mastiff first, who then came back into the match and attacked Dar causing him to be eliminated too. He then entered the inaugural "Super Strong Style 16" tournament but was eliminated in the first round by Dave Mastiff due to referee stoppage and a storyline injury. The two were due to meet at Chapter 20, however travel issues prevented Mastiff from appearing and so Dar faced Pastor William Eaver and lost in what would become Dar's last Progress match.

=== Total Nonstop Action Wrestling (2014–2015) ===
Dar was a contestant on Season 2 of Total Nonstop Action Wrestling's British Boot Camp which was televised nationally in the UK on Challenge TV. He advanced to the final six but the competition was eventually won by Mark Andrews.

Dar worked a handful of matches for TNA in the UK and US, most notably a loss on Xplosion to former TNA World Heavyweight Champion Austin Aries. As one of the final six, Dar accompanied TNA on their UK stadium tour where he was victorious in a pair of Tag Team matches and wrestled to a no-contest with Rampage Brown.

=== What Culture Pro Wrestling (2016) ===
On 2 June 2016, Dar was announced to be a part of the What Culture Pro Wrestling roster. He wrestled his first match for the promotion against Rampage on 4 July episode of Loaded, in which Dar lost via pinfall. On 18 July episode of Loaded, he faced Joseph Conners in a winning effort. At WCPW Built To Destroy, he faced off against Jay Lethal for the ROH World Championship, but was defeated via pinfall. On 8 August episode of Loaded, Dar faced off against Will Ospreay and El Ligero in a triple threat match. Ospreay emerged victorious, after an OsCutter on Dar.

On 15 August episode of Loaded, Dar put his WCPW career on the line against Doug Williams for a chance to face Cody Rhodes in October, and after a controversial finish, Williams picked up the win, forcing Dar to leave WCPW.

=== WWE (2016–present) ===
==== Cruiserweight division (2016–2018) ====
On 31 March 2016, Dar was announced as a participant in WWE's upcoming Global Cruiserweight Series tournament representing both Israel and Scotland. The tournament, now renamed the "Cruiserweight Classic", began on 23 June with Dar defeating Indian representative Gurv Sihra in his first round match. On 14 July, Dar defeated Hong Kong native Ho Ho Lun in his second round match. On 26 August, Dar was eliminated from the tournament in the quarter-finals by Englishman Zack Sabre Jr. During the Cruiserweight Classic finale, Dar teamed with Cedric Alexander in a losing effort against Johnny Gargano and Tommaso Ciampa.

On 22 August episode of Raw, Dar was announced as part of the upcoming cruiserweight division and had signed with WWE in the process, making him the first Israeli-born wrestler signed to the company. On 7 November episode of Raw, Dar teamed with The Brian Kendrick in a losing effort against Rich Swann and Sin Cara in his main roster debut, which also was in his home country. On 6 December episode of 205 Live, Dar was victorious over Cedric Alexander. After the match, Dar cut a villainous promo, establishing himself as a heel in the process.

In early 2017, Dar began an on-screen relationship with Alicia Fox, who was involved in an on-screen relationship with Alexander. After two separate occasions in which Alexander was defeated by Dar, the two had a third match on 10 January episode of 205 Live. Fox interfered in the match on behalf of Dar, allowing him to defeat Alexander once again, officially siding with Dar. Dar and Fox would subsequently accompany each other to their respective matches. At Fastlane, Dar teamed with Kendrick in a losing effort against Swann and Akira Tozawa. After weeks of Fox receiving anonymous flowers (in which Dar would take credit for them), Swann revealed himself to be the sender on 18 April episode of 205 Live. Fox chose to side with Swann, abandoning Dar. Dar and Fox reunited on 2 May episode of 205 Live after Dar defeated Swann. The two would team together in a losing effort to Swann and Sasha Banks at Extreme Rules. Dar lost to a recently returning Alexander on 11 July episode of 205 Live in an "I Quit" match. Following his loss, Dar broke up with Fox.

In the latter half of 2017, Dar joined "The Zo Train," a faction consisting of Ariya Daivari, Drew Gulak, Tony Nese, and WWE Cruiserweight Champion Enzo Amore. On 12 December 2017, it was reported that Dar had suffered a knee injury and that he would require surgery. Dar underwent successful surgery to his left knee on 14 December to repair a tear in his meniscus, and despite not having a definitive timetable for returning, stated that it was "more than likely going to be around the five-month mark." On 20 June 2018 taping for WWE's United Kingdom Championship Tournament, Dar returned to action in a fatal four-way match, defeating Flash Morgan Webster, Mark Andrews, and Travis Banks to become the number one contender for the WWE United Kingdom Championship.

On 3 July 2018, Dar made his return to 205 Live as a face, defeating TJP. A week later, Dar had a rematch with TJP in a losing effort via submission. On his return, he began a brief feud with Lio Rush. Dar was supposed to face Rush on 19 September episode of 205 Live, however, Rush postponed the match for next week, which Rush won.

==== NXT UK (2018–2022) ====
On 17 October, at the first episode of NXT UK, Dar unsuccessfully challenged Pete Dunne for the WWE United Kingdom Championship in the main event. Dar began a feud with Tony Nese, with the two exchanging victories and Nese attacking him in the parking lot. The feud ended however on 12 February 2019 episode of 205 Live in a well-received No Disqualification match, in which Nese won.

On 13 March episode of NXT UK, Dar turned heel by hating on the cruiserweights in NXT UK. Dar then offered Mark Andrews a handshake, then tried attacking Andrews who countered and sent Dar out of the ring. The following episode featured a match between Andrews and Dar that resulted in a no-contest. During the match, Dar injured his knee, which kept him out of action for almost two months. On 19 April, he returned from injury at the NXT UK television tapings. At NXT UK TakeOver: Cardiff, Dar defeated Travis Banks in his first TakeOver match of any kind. After NXT UK's return from the COVID-19 pandemic, it was announced that Dar would be a part of the NXT UK Heritage Cup inaugural tournament. He defeated Alexander Wolfe in the first round of the tournament with Pete Dunne as the special guest referee. On 5 November 2020 episode of NXT UK, Dar lost to eventual winner, A-Kid, in the second round of the NXT UK Heritage Cup tournament.

In 2021, Dar started hosting his own talk show called Supernova Sessions and begun an on-screen association with real life friend Sha Samuels. On 7 October episode of NXT UK, Dar defeated Wolfgang to become the next #1 Contender to the NXT UK Heritage Cup. On 28 October episode of NXT UK, Dar defeated Tyler Bate 2–1 to win the NXT UK Heritage Cup Championship, winning his first championship in WWE in the process and becoming the first champion of Israeli descent in company history. On 14 July episode of NXT UK, Noam Dar lost the Heritage Cup Championship to Mark Coffey with the match ending in the sixth round. Dar would go on to regain the Heritage Cup Championship from Mark Coffey on 7 July taping of NXT UK.

==== The Meta-Four (2023–2025) ====
Following the closure of the NXT UK brand in September 2022, Dar, along with the Heritage Cup, went on hiatus from WWE. He then appeared on 4 April 2023 episode of NXT. Making his debut for the NXT brand, Dar appeared to seek a new challenger for his renamed NXT Heritage Cup Championship. Dar then made his NXT in-ring debut on 18 April episode, defeating Myles Borne in a non-title match. On 16 May episode of NXT, Dragon Lee challenged Dar to a match at NXT Battleground for the Heritage Cup, which he accepted. At NXT Battleground on 28 May, Dar defeated Lee to retain the Heritage Cup with assistance from Jakara Jackson, Lash Legend and Oro Mensah. On 6 June episode of NXT during a backstage segment, Dar would accept Nathan Frazer's challenge for the Heritage Cup and introduce the group as The Meta-Four. The following week, it was revealed that Dar suffered a knee injury. Therefore, Mensah defended the Heritage Cup on Dar's behalf, but was defeated by Frazer, ending Dar's second reign at 292 days.

At NXT: Heatwave on 22 August, Dar defeated Frazer to win the Heritage Cup for a record-setting third time. At NXT: Halloween Havoc Night 1, Akira Tozawa returned to NXT and stole the Heritage Cup under The Meta-Four's noses. Tozawa returned the Heritage Cup to Dar on Night 2 before managing to spook Dar into a match for the Cup on the following week's NXT, with Dar winning the match 2-1. On the 27 February 2024 episode of NXT, Dar lost the Heritage Cup to No Quarter Catch Crew's Charlie Dempsey, losing the match 2-1, ending his third reign at 189 days. On 26 March, it was announced that The Meta-Four will be the host of NXT Stand & Deliver. Around this time, Dar started a rivalry with new NXT Champion Trick Williams. During a Supernova Sessions on the May 7 episode of NXT, Dar said that in a match between them where Williams won, Dar's leg was under the ropes which should have broken the pinfall and called Williams a fraud. Dar proceeded to attack Williams shortly after Legend revealed that she was having a relationship with Williams. On the following episode of NXT, Dar was found attacked by an unknown assailant. Later that night, Oro Mensah was defeated by Je'Von Evans after interference from Williams. On the May 28 episode of NXT, a debuting Ethan Page revealed himself as Dar's attacker. This was done to write Dar off television as he suffered a legitimate leg injury. During Dar's time away from television, Mensah began feuding with Page, effectively turning Dar and the rest of The Meta-Four face in the process. After an eleven-month hiatus, Dar returned from injury on the 22 April episode of NXT and defeated Lexis King to win the NXT Heritage Cup for a record-setting fourth time. On the following episode, Meta-Four would meet in a backstage segment in which they announced their mutual agreement to disband, citing personal singles ventures. Mensah and Jackson were subsequently released a few days later. On 22 June, NXT general manager Ava announced that Dar had vacated the NXT Heritage Cup due to another injury. He returned to in-ring competition on the 24 April 2026 NXT live event.

==== Tag team with Romeo Moreno (2026–present) ====
When Dar made his return on the 5 May 2026 episode of NXT, he began an alliance with Romeo Moreno as a mentor and tag team partner. On the 4 November episode of NXT, they defeated Hank & Tank (Hank Walker and Tank Ledger) to win 2026 Dusty Rhodes Tag Team Classic. For winning the tournament, they received a NXT Tag Team Championship match on the following week but were ruled out of the title match due to (kayfabe) injury after a backstage attack by The Vanity Project (Jackson Drake, Myka Lockwood, and NXT Tag Team Champions Brad Baylor and Ricky Smokes).

== Other media ==
Dar is a playable character in the video games WWE 2K18, WWE 2K19, WWE 2K20, WWE 2K23, WWE 2K24, WWE 2K25, and WWE 2K26.

== Championships and accomplishments ==
- British Championship Wrestling
  - BCW Openweight Championship (1 time)
- Insane Championship Wrestling
  - ICW World Heavyweight Championship (1 time)
  - ICW Zero-G Championship (2 times, inaugural)
  - ICW Zero-G Title Tournament (2010)
- Fighting Spirit Magazine
  - UK Wrestler of the Year Award (2012)
- One Pro Wrestling
  - 1PW Openweight Championship (1 time)
- Preston City Wrestling
  - PCW Cruiserweight Championship (1 time)
  - PCW Heavyweight Championship (1 time)
  - Road to Glory Tournament (2013)
- Premier British Wrestling
  - PBW Tag Team Championship (1 time) – with Liam Thomson
  - King of Cruisers (2012)
- Progress Wrestling
  - Progress World Cup (2014)
- Pro Wrestling Elite
  - PWE World Heavyweight Championship (1 time)
  - Elite Rumble (2015, 2016)
- Pro Wrestling Illustrated
  - Ranked No. 106 of the top 500 singles wrestlers in the PWI 500 in 2016
- WWE
  - NXT Heritage Cup (4 times)
  - Dusty Rhodes Tag Team Classic (2026) – with Romeo Moreno
  - NXT UK Heritage Cup #1 Contender Tournament (2021)

== See also ==
- List of Jewish professional wrestlers
