= Pac (wrestler) =

English professional wrestler (1986–2026)

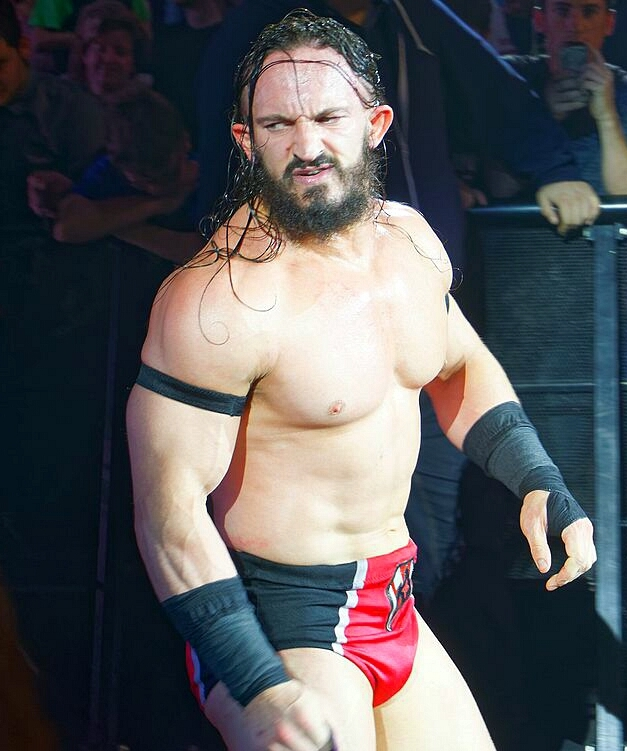
- Pac in 2017

Personal information
- Born: Benjamin Satterley; 22 August 1986 Newcastle upon Tyne, England
- Died: 27 September 2026 (aged 40) Des Plaines, Illinois, U.S.
- Spouse: Natalie Satterley (m. 2015)

Professional wrestling career
- Ring name(s): Adrian Neville; Ben Sacilly; Benjamin Satterley; Darkside Hayabusa; Jungle Pac; Neville; Pac; Steve Lyndon
- Billed height: 5 ft 8 in (173 cm)
- Billed weight: 194 lb (88 kg)
- Billed from: "The Jungle"; Newcastle upon Tyne, England
- Trained by: IWF Training School; FWA Academy; Mark Sloan
- Debut: 27 March 2004

Benjamin Satterley (22 August 1986 – 27 September 2026), better known by his ring name Pac (often stylised in all caps), was an English professional wrestler. He was best known for his tenures in All Elite Wrestling (AEW) and WWE.

Satterley began his wrestling career under the ring name Pac in his native north east England with the Independent Wrestling Federation (IWF). After establishing himself throughout the country with promotions such as Real Quality Wrestling (RQW) and One Pro Wrestling (1PW), he began to perform overseas, most notably for American promotions such as Pro Wrestling Guerrilla (PWG), Ring of Honor (ROH), and Chikara, as well as the Japanese promotion Dragongate, where he won the Open the Brave, Triangle, and Twin Gate Championships. He was a former PWG World Tag Team Champion and winner of PWG's inaugural Dynamite Duumvirate Tag Team Title Tournament.

From 2012 to 2015, Satterley wrestled under the ring name Adrian Neville in NXT, the developmental territory of WWE. He won the NXT Tag Team Championship twice, with his first reign coming as one half of the inaugural champions with Oliver Grey and his second reign being with Corey Graves. He was also a one-time NXT Champion, making him the first man to have held both the NXT Championship and the NXT Tag Team Championship. He was promoted to the main roster under the shortened ring name Neville in 2015, and began competing in the cruiserweight division in 2016, becoming a record two-time WWE Cruiserweight Champion.

After leaving WWE in 2018, Satterley reverted to his previous ring name of Pac and returned to Dragongate, holding the Open the Dream Gate Championship for much of his time there and joining the villainous R.E.D. stable. He assumed the moniker of "The Bastard", which he continued to use until his death. In 2019, he left Dragon Gate and signed with AEW, where he became a member of the Death Triangle and Death Riders. He was also a one-time and the inaugural AEW International Champion and a two-time AEW World Trios Champion, at one point holding both the International and Trios titles simultaneously.

== Early life ==
Benjamin Satterley was born on 22 August 1986 in Newcastle upon Tyne, the son of Jill and Stephen Satterley.

== Professional wrestling career ==
=== Early career and training (2002–2004) ===
By the age of 16, Satterley had wrestled with backyard wrestling promotions TWXW in Gateshead and FXW in Middlesbrough, as well as the promotions Scarborough Wrestling Alliance in Scarborough and Essex Championship Wrestling in Essex. Even as one of the younger wrestlers in the group, his technical ability and athleticism ensured he was always in the most entertaining matches. Many of the FXW roster went on to form 3Count Wrestling (3CW). He started training as a wrestler on a more permanent basis at the age of 18 at the Independent Wrestling Federation training school at St Joseph's Hall in Gateshead, which he later described as "pretty much the only wrestling school in the area". He received professional training at the Frontier Wrestling Alliance Academy under Mark Sloan.

=== British independent circuit (2004–2012) ===
Satterley made his debut under the ring name PAC at Independent Wrestling Federation on 27 March 2004, losing to Assassin. For the first two years of his career, he wrestled mainly for IWF and 3 Count Wrestling. He won his first championship on 26 August 2005 when he teamed up with Harry Pain to defeat Chris Prime. In 2006, he began to wrestle all across Britain and Europe. He later performed in 3 Count Wrestling, where he debuted on 14 October 2005 and defeated EdEn and Falcon in the opening match. Pac went on to capture the 3CW North East Championship on 24 February 2006. He then captured the 3CW Triple Crown Championship at an ICW event, which he held for 110 days. Pac was defeated in his last 3CW match by Liam Thomson on 30 April 2010.

Pac made his debut for International Pro Wrestling: United Kingdom in April 2006, wrestling for the IPW:UK Title on his debut, losing in a triple threat against Leroy Kincaide and champion and match winner Martin Stone. He later had two more opportunities at the top title in IPW:UK, against Stone and then against Andy Boy Simmonz, but lost both. After a September 2006 triple threat against Kevin Steen and El Generico, the two Canadian wrestlers recommended Satterley to PWG head-booker Super Dragon. He made his PWG debut two months later as a result.

After joining One Pro Wrestling in May 2006, Pac became the first-ever Openweight Champion on 26 November after winning a battle royal. He successfully retained the title on several occasions before losing it to James Wallace on 30 June 2007 in a match that started immediately after Pac retained the title in a four-way match. On 29 December, Pac failed to reclaim the title after losing to then-champion Darren Burridge.

In late April, Pac represented International Pro Wrestling: United Kingdom in the prestigious King of Europe Cup. He defeated Trent Acid in the first round before falling to Nigel McGuinness in the quarter finals.

On 29 September 2006, Pac teamed with Sheamus O'Shaunessy to defeat Micky L and Tony Spitfire for British Championship Wrestling's Retribution event. He returned for BCW No Blood, No Sympathy VI in 2008 to score a singles victory over CJ Hunter. Pac made his as yet final appearance for BCW at BCW Pac Is Back on 12 April 2019 where he unsuccessfully challenged BT Gunn for the BCW Heavyweight Championship in a triple threat with Jody Fleisch.

On 17 November 2009, Pac debuted in American Wrestling Rampage during its European Invasion tour, and lost to Dunkan Disorderly in a three-way match also involving Shawn Maxer for the promotion's No Limits Championship. Two days later, he wrestled against Disorderly in a singles match for the title, but was defeated. After defeating Disorderly in tag-team matches over the next two days, Pac and Maxer wrestled against Disorderly for the No Limits Title in another three-way match on 22 November, but were again defeated. After trading wins with El Generico over the next few days, Pac finally won the title after defeating Generico and new champion Michael Knight on 29 November. After successfully retaining the title against Generico on 4 and 6 December, Pac lost the title to Dunkan Disorderly on 8 December. The next day, Pac and Generico defeated Disorderly and Shawn Maxer in a tag-team match.

=== Pro Wrestling Guerrilla (2006–2008) ===
On 17 November 2006, Pac made his debut in Pro Wrestling Guerrilla. He competed against A.J. Styles in a losing effort of the first night of All Star Weekend IV. The next night, he faced El Generico in a match that was considered by those in attendance a serious Match of the Year contender. Pac returned to PWG on 24 February 2007, defeating Kevin Steen to pick up his first win in the promotion. He faced Generico again on 7 April, this time in the main event of the first night of All Star Weekend V with the PWG World Championship on the line. Generico once again came out on top. The next night, Pac faced All Japan Pro Wrestling star Kaz Hayashi in a losing effort.

Pac was originally scheduled to compete in singles matches during the first PWG Dynamite Duumvirate Tag Team Title Tournament on 20 and 21 May. However, Roderick Strong's original partner, Jack Evans, had been called back to Dragon Gate at the last moment and decided to have Pac fill the vacant spot. After defeating Super Dragon and Davey Richards in the first round, Naruki Doi and Masato Yoshino in the second round and then The Briscoe Brothers in the finals, Pac and Strong won the tournament and as a result, became the new World Tag Team Champions. In their first title defence, Pac and Strong defeated The Havana Pitbulls (Ricky Reyes and Rocky Romero) at PWG's event Roger Dorn Night on 10 June. From 15 to 22 July, Pac took part and competed for Dragon Gate's biggest tour of the year, Wrestle Jam, where he and El Generico represented PWG alongside Ring of Honor representatives Austin Aries, Delirious, Jack Evans, Matt Sydal and Jimmy Rave.

On 29 July, Pac and Strong were scheduled to defend their World Tag Team Championship against the Briscoe Brothers in a 2 out of 3 falls match. However, they were replaced by Kevin Steen and El Generico, who ended up winning the World Tag Team Championship in a one fall match. Pac was among the 24 participants in the 2007 Battle of Los Angeles Tournament in Burbank, California, that ran from 31 August to 2 September. He defeated Jack Evans in a first round match then Claudio Castagnoli in a second round match before losing to eventual tournament winner Cima in a semi-final round match. After almost a year-long absence from the company, Pac made his return to PWG at All Star Weekend VII on 30 August 2008, where he picked up the win for the team of himself and The Young Bucks by pinning Kevin Steen, who teamed with El Generico and Susumu Yokosuka. The next night, Pac was unsuccessful in his attempt to win the World Championship from then-champion Chris Hero. Pac returned to PWG on 23 July 2011, facing Kevin Steen in a losing effort. On 29 January 2012, at Kurt Russellreunion 3, Pac teamed with El Generico and Masato Yoshino to defeat Akira Tozawa, Kevin Steen and Super Dragon in a six-man tag team main event.

=== Various international promotions (2007–2012) ===
A highlight reel showcasing some of Pac's manoeuvres while performing in DragonGate USA, c. 2011

In January 2007, Pac wrestled as part of Total Nonstop Action Wrestling's "ImPact! Total" tour in Portugal along with fellow British wrestlers Spud, Jonny Storm and Jody Fleisch. Soon after the tour, Pac debuted in Ring of Honor at their 3 and 4 March shows at the Liverpool Olympia in Liverpool, England. On the first night, he lost to Roderick Strong in a match for the FIP World Heavyweight Championship. On the second, he was defeated by Matt Sydal. On 24 August, he returned to ROH in a losing effort against Bryan Danielson. At ROH's Manhattan Mayhem, he lost to Davey Richards.

On 21 April 2007, Pac debuted in Chikara at their show Rey De Voladores in a four-way elimination match against Chuck Taylor, Ricochet and Retail Dragon, which was won by Taylor. In August 2007, Pac returned to Chikara at their International Invaders weekend. On the first night, he was defeated by Ricochet. The next night, he was defeated by Claudio Castagnoli. On 23 August, he participated at Chikara's eighth Ballpark Brawl, where he lost a six-way elimination match that featured Sterling James Keenan, Trent Acid, El Generico, Xtremo and John McChesney, which was won by Keenan.

On 27 May 2012, Pac made his New Japan Pro-Wrestling debut, when he entered the 2012 Best of the Super Juniors tournament, defeating Jushin Thunder Liger in his first match. When the round-robin stage of the tournament concluded on 9 June, Pac finished with five wins out of his eight matches, winning his block and advancing to the semifinals of the tournament. He lost to Ryusuke Taguchi the following day, and was eliminated from the tournament.

=== Dragon Gate and affiliates (2007–2012) ===
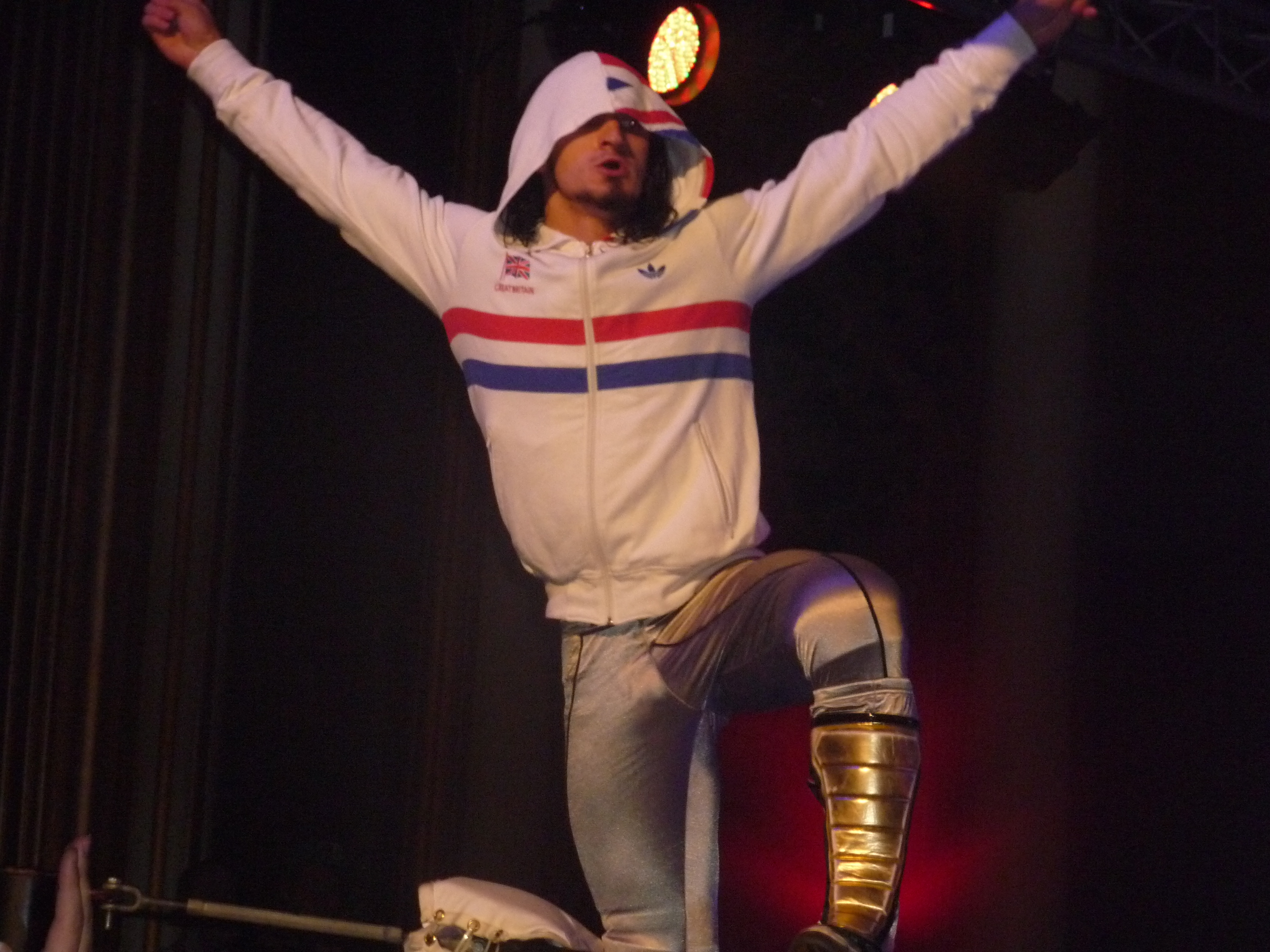
PAC posing during an appearance for Dragon Gate in 2009

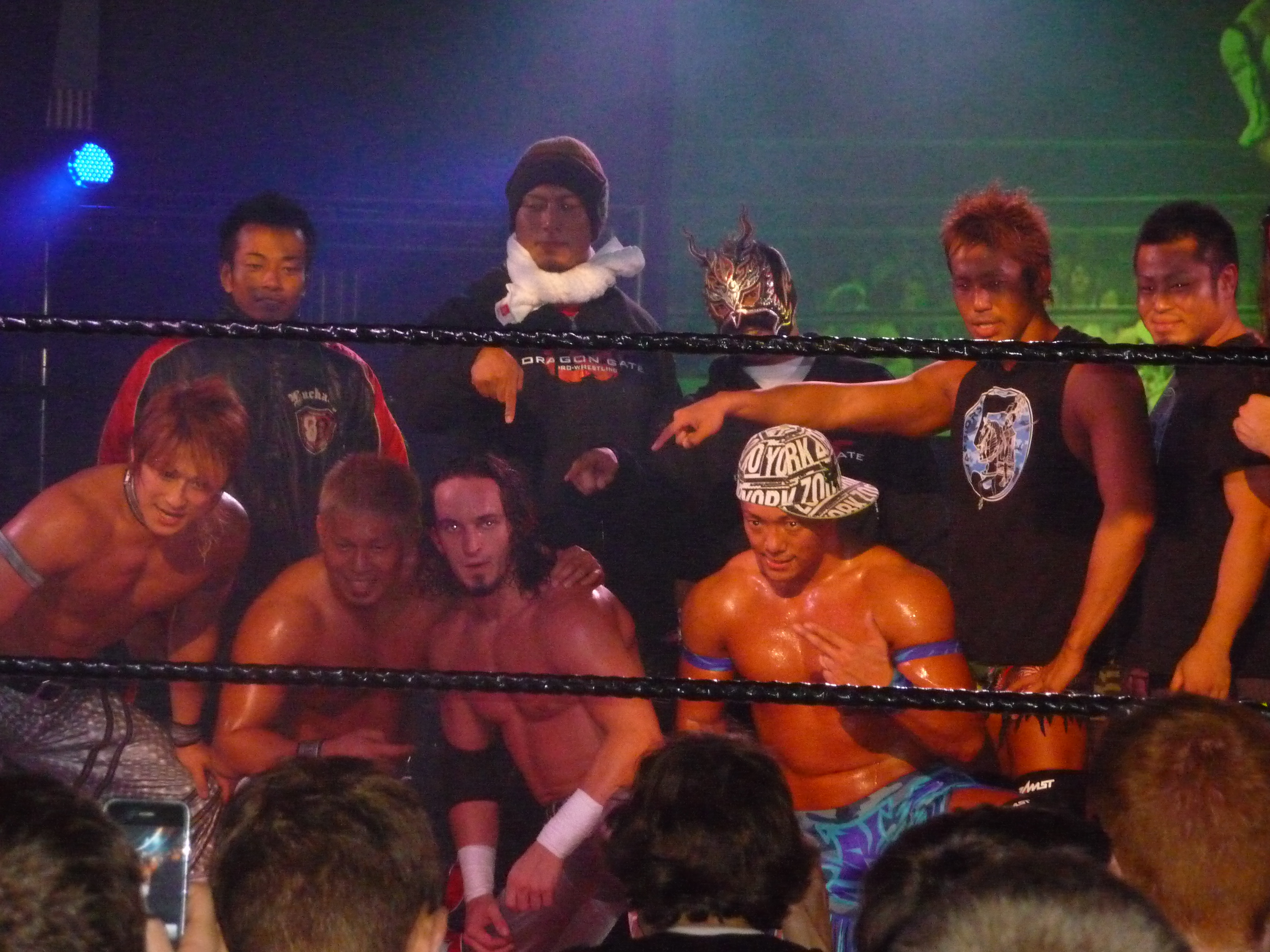
Pac (bottom centre) posing with various Dragon Gate wrestlers

Shortly after participating in Pro Wrestling Guerrilla's Battle of Los Angeles tournament, Pac was invited to Dragon Gate for its Dragon Storm 2007 tour beginning on 8 September. The tour was the last for World Wrestling Entertainment-bound Matt Sydal, who on 14 September endorsed Pac to be his replacement in the Dragon Gate faction Typhoon. On 15 September, Pac defeated Dragon Kid for the Westside Xtreme Wrestling World Lightweight Championship. On 25 April 2008, Pac lost to Gamma in the first round of a tournament for the Open the Brave Gate Championship. On 31 May, Pac and Dragon Kid wrestled against fellow Typhoon members Ryo Saito and Susumu Yokosuka for the Open the Twin Gate Championship, but were unable to win. On 27 July, Pac, Dragon Kid and Anthony W. Mori represented Typhoon in a four-way match for the Open the Triangle Gate Championship, but were unable to defeat Gamma, Yamato and Yasushi Kanda for the title. Typhoon disbanded later that year.

In 2009, Pac joined the World-1 stable. On 22 March 2009, Pac and stablemates BxB Hulk and Naoki Tanizaki represented World-1 in a loss to the Open the Triangle Gate Champions Kamikaze (Dragon Kid, Shingo Takagi and Taku Iwasa) in a three-way match also involving Real Hazard (Kenichiro Arai, Yamato and Yasushi Kanda). World-1 again challenged for the title on 24 May, but were defeated by the new champions Warriors-5 (Cima, Gamma and Kagetora). On 7 June, World-1 finally won the Open the Triangle Gate Championship after defeating Warriors-5. World-1 made their first successful title defence on 19 July, where they defeated Kamikaze (Akira Tozawa, Dragon Kid and Taku Iwasa). On 7 February 2010, Pac lost to K-ness in a match for the Open the Brave Gate Championship. On 5 July 2010, Pac made his debut for Dragon Gate's international expansion Dragon Gate USA, wrestling in a match where he and BxB Hulk were defeated by Yamato and Shingo. At the following day's tapings of the Uprising pay-per-view, Pac and Naruki Doi defeated Jigsaw and Mike Quackenbush. On 14 October, World-1 lost the Open the Triangle Gate Title to Akebono, Fujii and Mochizuki in a rematch. On 20 December 2010, Dragon Gate USA announced that they had signed Pac to a contract that made him a regular member of the promotion's roster. On 30 January 2011, Pac and Masato Yoshino defeated Chuck Taylor and Johnny Gargano to become Dragon Gate USA's first ever Open the United Gate Champions. On 11 September, Pac and Yoshino lost the Open the United Gate Championship to Open the Twin Gate Champions, Cima and Ricochet, in a title vs. title match. On 29 August 2010, Pac defeated Susumu Yokosuka in a tournament final to win the vacant Open the Brave Gate Championship for the first time. On 14 April 2011, Pac, BxB Hulk and Susumu Yokosuka failed to win the Open the Triangle Gate Championship from Blood Warriors (Cima, Dragon Kid and Ricochet) and, as a result, World-1 was forced to disband.

On 24 April 2011, former World-1 members Pac, Hulk, Yokosuka and Yoshino agreed to form a new alliance with Masaaki Mochizuki to battle Blood Warriors. On 8 June, the new group was named Junction Three in reference to it being a union between the former members of World-1, Kamikaze and the Veteran-gun. On 19 June, Pac and Dragon Kid defeated the Blood Warriors team of Ryo Saito and Genki Horiguchi to win the Open the Twin Gate Championship. They lost the title to Blood Warriors representatives Cima and Ricochet on 17 July. On 19 November, Pac lost the Open the Brave Gate Championship to Ricochet, ending his record reign at 447 days. On 9 February 2012, Junction Three was forced to disband, after losing a fourteen-man elimination tag team match to Blood Warriors. On 4 March, Pac received a shot at Dragon Gate's top title, the Open the Dream Gate Championship, but was defeated by defending champion, Cima. On 25 March 2012, Pac joined Masato Yoshino, Naruki Doi, Ricochet, and Rich Swann and formed World-1 International. On 6 May 2012, Pac, alongside World-1 International members Masato Yoshino and Naruki Doi defeated Genki Horiguchi H.A.Gee.Mee!, Jimmy Kanda, and Ryo "Jimmy" Saito at the 2012 Dead or Alive pay-per-view to become the 34th Open the Triangle Gate Champions. On 22 July, Pac made his final Dragon Gate appearance, during which he, Yoshino and Doi successfully defended the Open the Triangle Gate Championship in a three-way match.

=== WWE (2012–2018) ===
==== British Ambition (2012–2013) ====
In July 2012, it was reported that Satterley had signed a contract with WWE. He joined WWE's developmental territory NXT and made his television debut under the ring name Adrian Neville on 16 January 2013 episode of NXT, defeating Sakamoto.

Neville formed the British Ambition tag team with Oliver Grey, and the English duo won a tournament to crown the inaugural NXT Tag Team Champions by defeating The Wyatt Family (Luke Harper and Erick Rowan) in the finals on 13 February episode of NXT. British Ambition had earlier defeated 3MB (Heath Slater and Drew McIntyre) in the first round and Kassius Ohno and Leo Kruger in the semi-finals. With Grey out injured with a torn ACL (in storyline inflicted by the Wyatt Family), Neville chose Bo Dallas as his new partner in April. On 24 April on NXT, Neville lost to Antonio Cesaro while challenging for his United States Championship. On 8 May episode of NXT, Neville and Dallas failed in their first defence of the tag title when they lost them to the Wyatt Family.

==== NXT Champion (2013–2015) ====
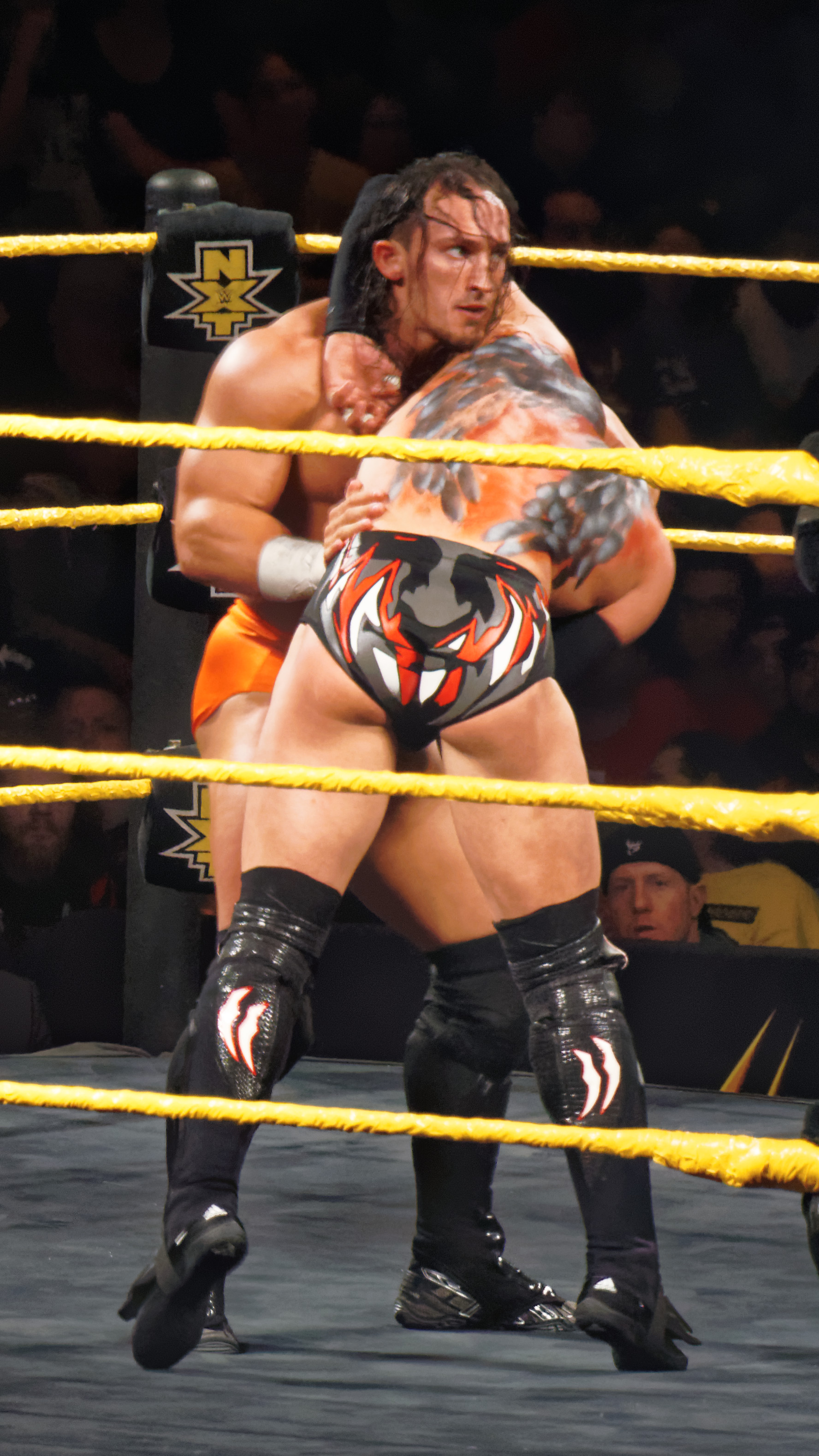
Neville wrestling Finn Bálor in March 2015

On 29 May episode of NXT, Neville competed in an NXT Championship number one contender battle royal, eliminating Mason Ryan and Bray Wyatt (who had eleven and two eliminations respectively) to make it to the final two participants, but his former tag partner Dallas eliminated him to win the match. Later, Dallas won his title match to become NXT Champion. Neville continued his feud with the Wyatt Family by losing to them in two six-man tag matches, once while teaming with Corey Graves and Kassius Ohno, and once with Graves and William Regal. On 20 June, Neville regained the NXT Tag Team Championship from the Wyatt Family with a new partner in Graves. On 6 August episode of NXT, Neville faced Dean Ambrose for his United States Championship, which Ambrose retained when the other members of The Shield caused a disqualification. Neville and Graves lost the title to The Ascension (Conor O'Brian and Rick Victor) in September. Following this, the two feuded after failing to regain the title.

Neville first became number one contender to the NXT Championship on 27 November episode of NXT by defeating Sami Zayn, after both men previously tied a beat the clock challenge. Neville faced former tag partner Bo Dallas for the title on the next episode and won by countout, which meant that the title did not change hands. Two episodes later, Neville faced Dallas again for the title in a lumberjack match, but lost when lumberjack Tyler Breeze interfered. Neville once again became number one contender after Dallas failed to defeat Neville in a beat-the-clock challenge match on 22 January episode of NXT that arose due to Dallas' boasting. At NXT Arrival, Neville won the NXT Championship from Dallas in a ladder match. A rematch was scheduled for the 20 March episode of NXT, which he won after debuting a new finisher, the imploding 450° splash.

Neville's first feud as champion began following a non-title match against Brodus Clay, where Neville won by countout. The feud ended with Neville scoring a No Disqualification match victory over Clay to successfully defend the NXT Championship. At NXT TakeOver, Neville successfully defended the NXT Championship against Tyson Kidd. Two weeks later, Neville retained his championship against Kidd again after Natalya prevented Kidd from using a chair. On 31 July episode of NXT, he successfully defended his title against Tyler Breeze by disqualification as Tyson Kidd attacked Neville after being super kicked by Neville. On 8 September, Neville made his first appearance on Raw as part of an NXT showcase match to promote NXT TakeOver: Fatal 4-Way, he teamed with Sami Zayn to defeat Kidd and Breeze in a tag team match. On 11 September at the NXT TakeOver: Fatal 4-Way event, Neville successfully defended his NXT Championship against Sami Zayn, Tyler Breeze and Tyson Kidd in a fatal four-way match. On 4 December, Neville became the longest reigning NXT Champion of all time, surpassing the record set by Bo Dallas (which was surpassed by Finn Bálor in April 2016). Later, on 11 December at the NXT TakeOver: R Evolution event, Neville lost the championship to Zayn, ending his reign at 287 days. When Zayn offered a handshake, Neville kicked it away and instead hugged Zayn in respect. The following week on 18 December episode of NXT, Neville faced Kevin Owens, but the match ended in a double countout. Owens powerbombed Neville into the apron after the match. Neville received a rematch on 15 January 2015 episode of NXT, but failed to regain the title. Neville went on to compete in a NXT Championship number one contender's tournament, defeating Tyson Kidd in the quarterfinals on 28 January and Baron Corbin in the semifinals on 4 February, but lost in the finals to Finn Bálor at NXT TakeOver: Rival, which marked his final NXT appearance.

==== Various feuds (2015–2016) ====
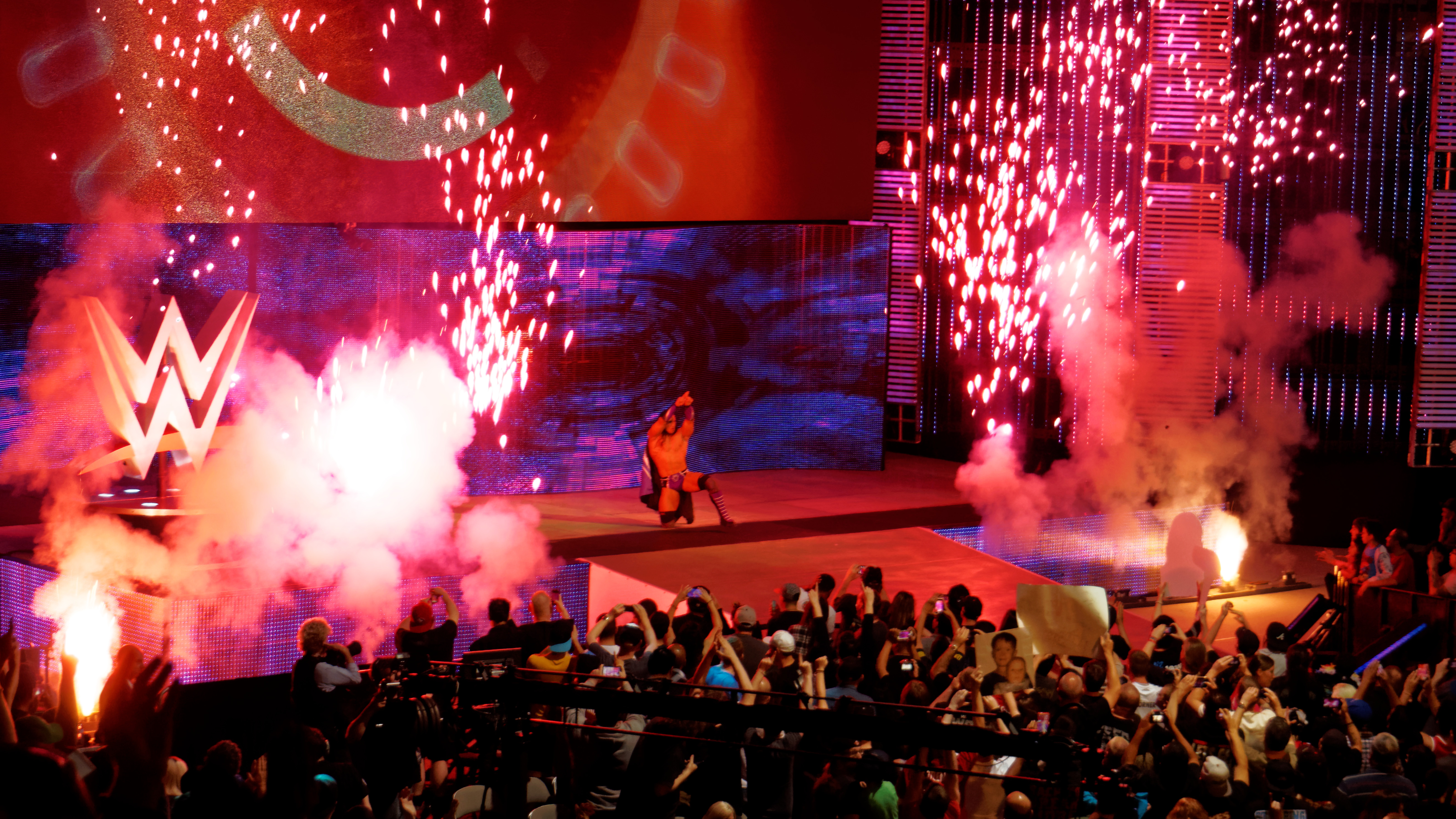
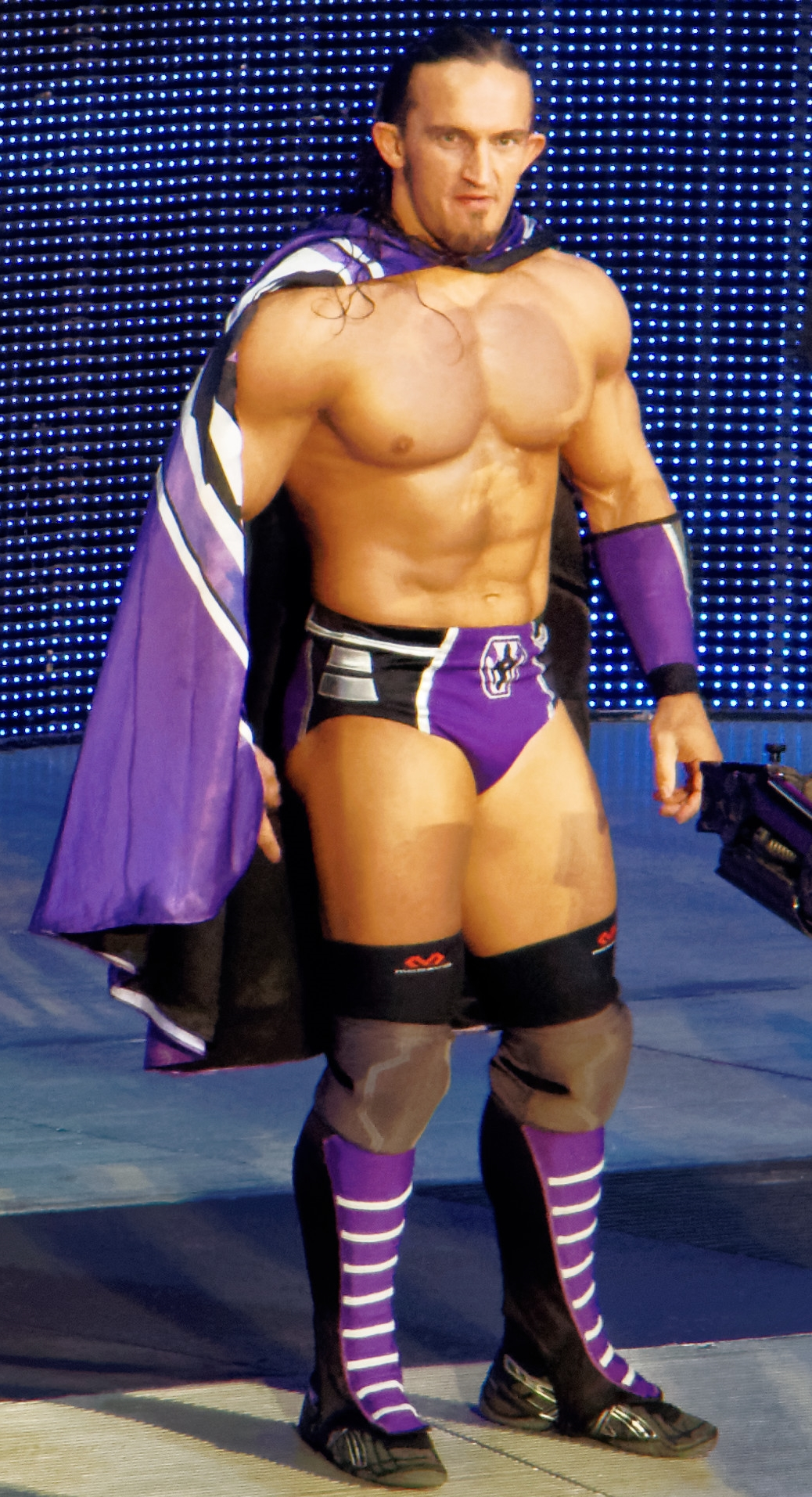
Neville was promoted to the main roster on 30 March 2015 with his new gimmick "the man that gravity forgot"

On 30 March 2015 episode of Raw, Neville made his main roster debut, now under the mononym "Neville", defeating Curtis Axel. He then defeated Bad News Barrett at the Extreme Rules pay-per-view the following month. Following this, Neville competed in the 2015 King of the Ring tournament, where he was defeated by Barrett in the finals. Following this, Neville began a feud with Bo Dallas, setting up a match at Elimination Chamber, which Neville won.

Neville then entered a feud with Stardust in a comic book inspired rivalry. At SummerSlam on 23 August, Neville teamed up with actor Stephen Amell, defeating the team of Stardust and Barrett. At Night of Champions in September, Neville teamed with The Lucha Dragons (Kalisto and Sin Cara) in a loss to Stardust and the Ascension. At the Survivor Series pre-show, Neville competed in a traditional Survivor Series match, teaming with The Dudley Boyz (Bubba Ray Dudley and D-Von Dudley), Goldust and Titus O'Neil in a victory over Stardust, The Ascension, The Miz and Bo Dallas. On 21 December episode of Raw, Neville won the Slammy Award for "Breakout Star of the Year".

At the Royal Rumble on 24 January 2016, Neville competed in his first Royal Rumble match as the number 16 entrant, lasting over 10 minutes before being eliminated by Luke Harper. In March 2016, Neville injured his ankle during a match with Chris Jericho on Raw, rendering him out of action for an estimated two to three months and forcing him to miss WrestleMania 32, at which he was scheduled to compete.

On 19 July, at the 2016 WWE draft, Neville was drafted to Raw. On 25 July episode of Raw, Neville made his televised return, defeating Curtis Axel. Neville teamed with Sami Zayn to defeat The Dudley Boyz (Bubba Ray Dudley and D-Von Dudley) at SummerSlam. The following night on Raw, Neville failed to defeat Kevin Owens to qualify for a fatal four-way elimination match for the vacant WWE Universal Championship after the interference of Chris Jericho. On 31 October episode of Raw, Neville participated in a battle royal for a spot on Team Raw at Survivor Series, but was eliminated by eventual winner Braun Strowman.

==== Cruiserweight Champion (2016–2017) ====
On 18 December at Roadblock: End of the Line, Neville returned to seemingly congratulate Cruiserweight Champion Rich Swann after his match only to attack Swann and his opponent T. J. Perkins, turning heel and joining the Cruiserweight division. The following night on Raw, Neville cemented his villainous turn after claiming that the fans only cheered him because he was "vulnerable or small" and proceeded to attack Swann along with Brian Kendrick after he interrupted him, followed by Perkins after he attempted to save Swann. Over the coming weeks, Neville defeated multiple Cruiserweights in singles competition including Perkins, Cedric Alexander, Lince Dorado and Swann in a non-title match. On 29 January 2017 at the Royal Rumble, Neville defeated Swann to capture the Cruiserweight Championship for the first time, marking his first title win on the main roster. Neville then started a feud with Jack Gallagher, and successfully defended his title at Fastlane against Gallagher.

The following night on Raw, Neville defended his title against Swann successfully. After the match, Austin Aries seemingly appeared to interview Neville only to attack him and start a feud between the two. At WrestleMania 33, Neville defeated Aries in his WrestleMania in-ring debut. Aries won a fatal-four-way match two days later on 205 Live, to earn a rematch against Neville at Payback, which Neville lost by disqualification, retaining the title as a result. Around this time, Neville formed an alliance with T. J. Perkins, who assisted him in his rivalry with Aries, in exchange for a promised championship opportunity. Neville defeated Aries again in a submission match at Extreme Rules to retain the Cruiserweight Championship, concluding their rivalry in the process. He ended his alliance with Perkins the following night, attacking him and later going on to successfully defend his championship against him on 6 June episode of 205 Live.

Neville then began feuding with Akira Tozawa who was granted a championship match for Great Balls of Fire by Titus O'Neil, in which Neville retained the title. He was also set to defend his title against Tozawa for the second time at SummerSlam, until the 14 August episode of Raw, where Neville lost the championship to Tozawa, ending his record setting reign at 197 days. However, Neville won the title back from Tozawa on the SummerSlam pre-show, making him the first-ever two-time WWE Cruiserweight Champion with the current belt.

Afterwards, he was confronted by Enzo Amore, the latest member of the Cruiserweight division. On 24 September at No Mercy, Neville dropped the title to Amore after being hit with a low blow while the referee was distracted. The following night on Raw, a double turn took place; Amore turned heel by disparaging the cruiserweight division, while Neville turned face when he spoke on behalf of the cruiserweights and attempted to attack Amore. Amore revealed he had a no-contact clause, which prevents any of the cruiserweights of receiving a future title shot should they attack him, but Neville attacked him nonetheless after the cruiserweights prevented Amore from leaving. The next night on 205 Live, after Neville defeated Ariya Daivari, he was attacked by Amore with a crutch.

==== Contract dispute and departure (2017–2018) ====
On 9 October 2017, Neville walked out on Raw, on which he was scheduled to lose to Enzo Amore. According to multiple sources Neville appeared to have quit the promotion, with one report stating that he had been unhappy for a while. WWE denied that Neville had left the promotion. By 13 November, there had reportedly been "positive discussions" between Neville and WWE with some in the company believing he could be on his way back. In January 2018, WWE froze Neville's contract, keeping him under contract indefinitely or until a release is agreed upon. On 24 August, it was reported that Neville was no longer under contract.

=== Return to Dragongate (2018–2019) ===
On 2 October 2018, two months after his WWE contract expired and almost exactly one year after he initially walked out on WWE, Satterley returned to Dragongate. Using his former ring name, Pac, he aligned himself with Eita and the villainous R.E.D. stable. In his return match, he pinned Shingo Takagi at Korakuen Hall. On 4 December, he defeated Masato Yoshino to win the Open the Dream Gate Championship, the first world championship win in his career, at Dragon Gate's "Fantastic Gate 2018" from Korakuen Hall. He held the championship until 21 July 2019, when he lost to Ben-K, ending his reign at 229 days.

=== All Elite Wrestling (2019–2026) ===
==== Various feuds (2019–2020) ====
On 8 January 2019, Pac was announced as one of the first signees to All Elite Wrestling (AEW). At AEW's inaugural rally in Jacksonville, Pac interrupted Adam Page, setting up a feud between the two wrestlers. At AEW's second rally in Las Vegas, a match between Page and Pac was officially announced for the company's inaugural event, Double or Nothing. However, in late May the match was cancelled due to "creative differences". They wrestled a match for independent promotion Wrestle Gate Pro on 17 May a week before Double or Nothing. Page won the match by disqualification and after the match, Pac attacked Page's knee and said that his goal all along was to injure Page and with that done, he had no reason to show up at Double or Nothing, thus establishing himself as a heel in the process. This was done to write the match off the card. On 23 August, Pac was revealed as Jon Moxley's replacement at All Out against Kenny Omega after Moxley was forced to pull out of the event due to injury. At All Out on 31 August, Pac defeated Omega by making him pass out in a crucifix hold (commonly known as the Rings of Saturn or the Brutaliser). On the premiere episode of Dynamite on 2 October, Pac defeated Page, thus rekindling their feud. At Full Gear on 9 November, Pac was defeated by Page, thereby suffering his first singles loss in AEW. Four days later on 13 November episode of Dynamite, Pac defeated Page to end the feud.

By the end of 2019 and going into 2020, Pac began a prolonged feud with Kenny Omega. After losing to him in a rematch on the Thanksgiving Eve special episode of Dynamite on 27 November, Pac began relentlessly pursuing a rubber match. After attacking Omega's friend Michael Nakazawa, Omega agreed to the match on 5 February 2020. The two wrestled in a 30-minute Iron Man match on 26 February episode of Dynamite, which Pac lost after the match went to sudden death overtime. After the loss, Pac's post-match interview was interrupted by Orange Cassidy, leading to a match between the two being arranged for the Revolution event on 29 February, in which Pac was victorious.

==== Death Triangle (2020–2024) ====
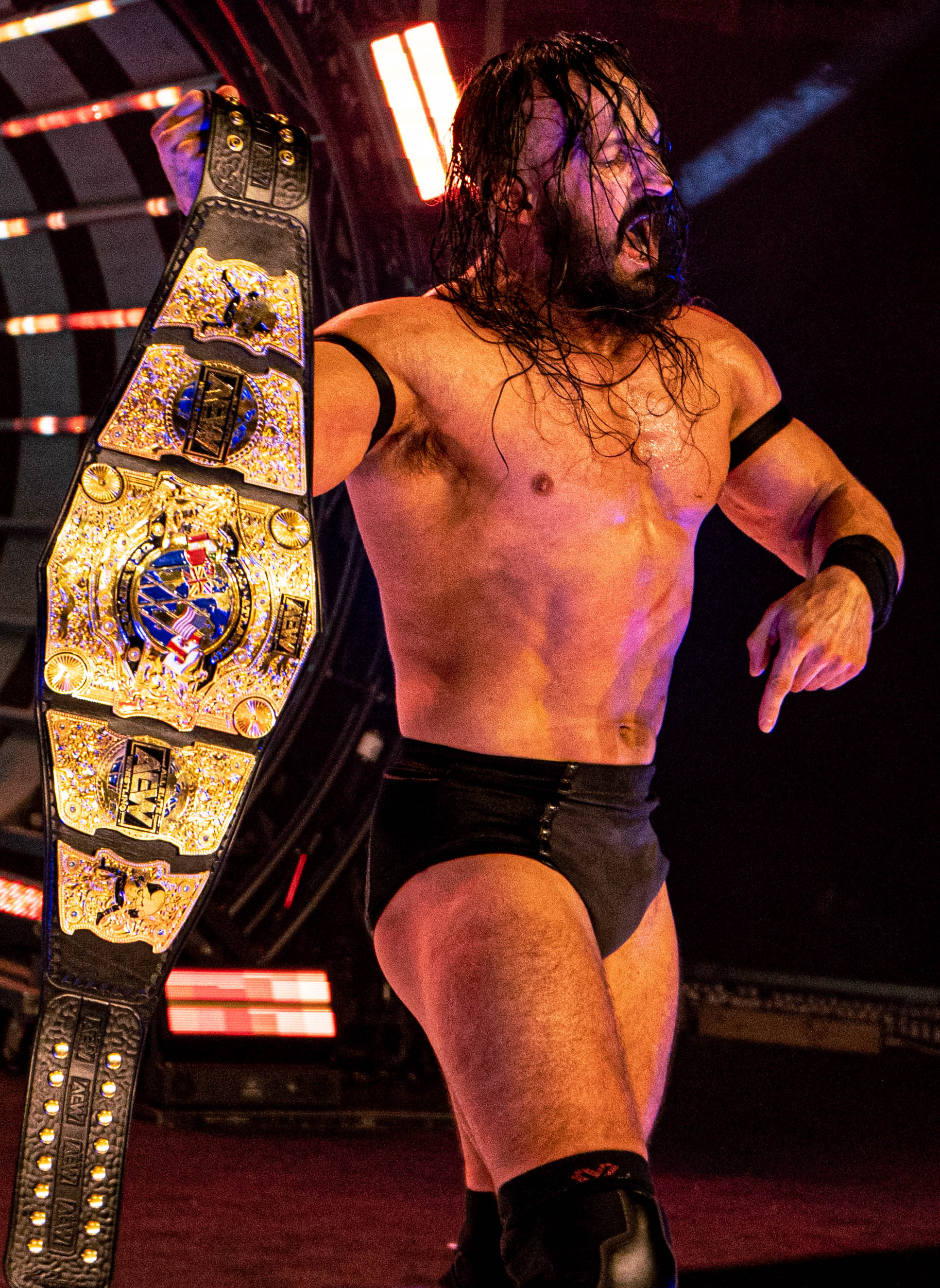
Pac after becoming the inaugural AEW International Champion (then called the All-Atlantic Championship) at Forbidden Door in June 2022

On 4 March 2020 episode of Dynamite, Pac formed an alliance with the Lucha Brothers (Penta El Zero Miedo and Rey Fenix) called the Death Triangle, attacking Orange Cassidy and Best Friends (Chuck Taylor and Trent). Afterwards, Pac was unable to travel due to the COVID-19 pandemic and became absent from AEW television for eight months, returning to AEW as a face on 11 November episode of Dynamite where he confronted Eddie Kingston On the following episode of Dynamite, Death Triangle was reformed after Fénix and Pentagón Jr. saved Pac from an attack by Kingston, The Butcher and The Blade.

At New Year's Smash on 13 January 2021, Pac defeated Kingston. At Revolution on 7 March, Pac and Fénix won a Casino Tag Team Battle Royale to determine the next challengers for the AEW World Tag Team Championship. They challenged The Young Bucks (Matt Jackson and Nick Jackson) for the tag team championship on 14 April episode of Dynamite, but were defeated. Ranked as the #2 contender for the AEW World Championship, Pac and Orange Cassidy faced off in a rematch to decide the #1 contender for Kenny Omega at Double or Nothing. The match ended in a double count-out, due to interference from Omega and Don Callis. However, Tony Khan signed a three-way match for Double or Nothing, in which Omega retained his championship.

After Double or Nothing, Pac started a feud with Andrade El Idolo, which led to a match on 9 September episode of Rampage, where Pac was defeated. Pac and Andrade had a rematch on 22 October episode of Rampage, where Pac emerged victorious. At Full Gear, Pac teamed with Cody Rhodes against Andrade and Malakai Black in a winning effort. On 23 February edition of Dynamite, Pac again teamed with Penta El Zero Miedo, who was now using the name 'Penta Oscuro', to defeat Kings Of The Black Throne (Brody King and Malakai Black). At Revolution's buy-in show, Pac and Oscuro teamed with Erick Redbeard in a trios match against the House of Black (now completed with Buddy Matthews), which they lost.

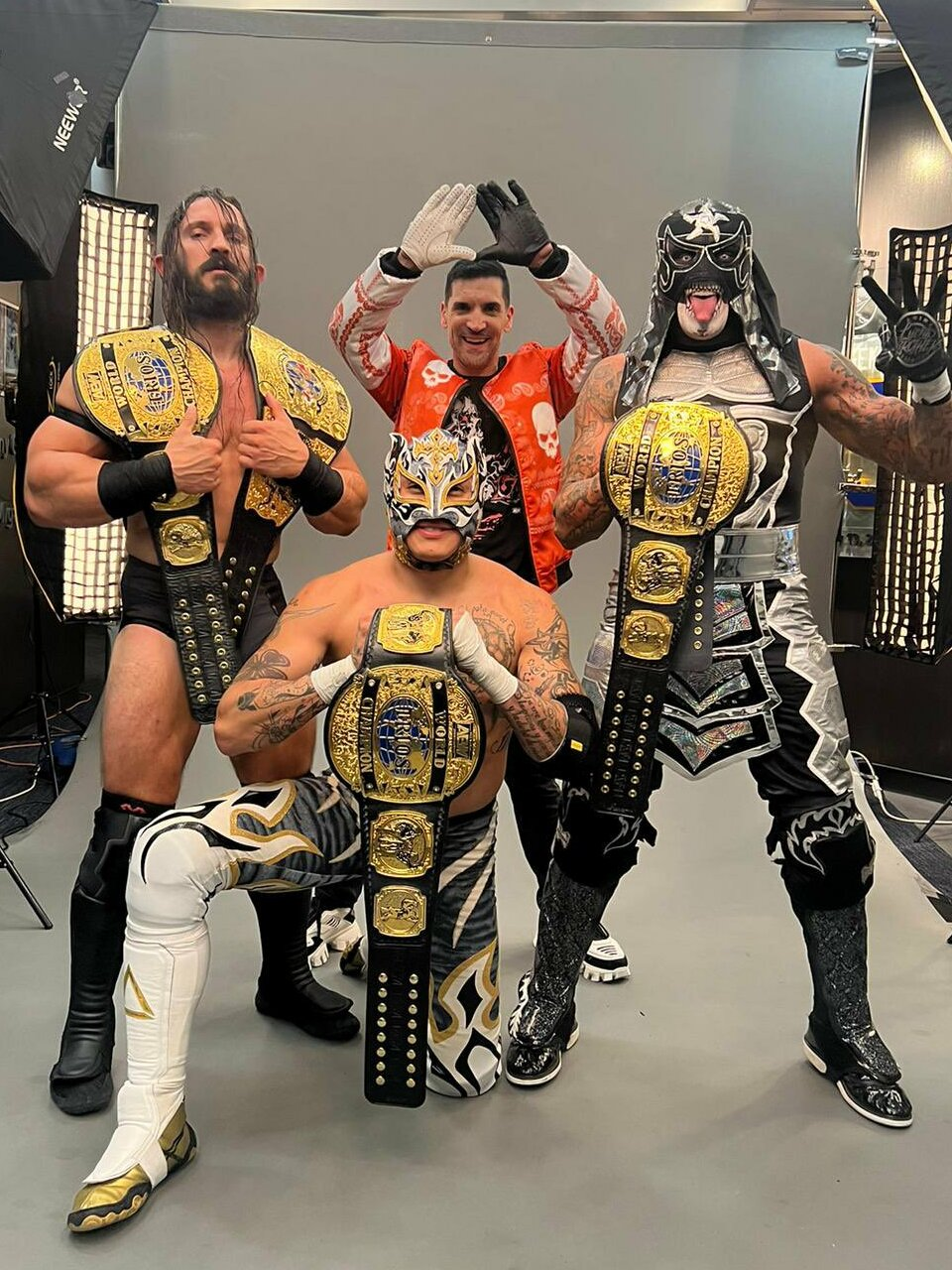
Death Triangle as the AEW World Trios Champions in September 2022

In June, Pac participated in a tournament for the AEW All-Atlantic Championship, defeating Buddy Matthews on 8 June edition of Dynamite, advancing to the finals. On 26 June at Forbidden Door, Pac defeated Miro, Malakai Black and Clark Connors in a fatal four-way match to become the inaugural champion. Death Triangle won the then-vacated AEW World Trios Championship on 7 September episode of Dynamite. He lost his All-Atlantic Championship to Orange Cassidy on 12 October episode of Dynamite, ending his reign at 108 days. On 11 January 2023 edition of Dynamite, Death Triangle lost their Trios titles to the Elite (Kenny Omega and the Young Bucks) in the finale of a Best of Seven Series. During that series of matches, Pac suffered a major nose injury during a ladder match at Full Gear. Following the conclusion of the series with the Elite, Pac became inactive in order to heal his injury.

On 12 July 2023, episode of Dynamite, Pac returned from the nose injury and was announced as the fifth member of the Blackpool Combat Club's team for the Blood and Guts match the following week, alongside Jon Moxley, Claudio Castagnoli, Wheeler Yuta and Konosuke Takeshita. Pac entered as the BCC's second member, but the team lost against The Golden Elite. Castagnoli, frustrated with how Pac left the match, challenged him to a match for the Ring of Honor World Championship at Death Before Dishonor the Friday after Blood and Guts, which Pac lost. On 26 July episode of Dynamite, he faced the luchador Gravity, with Pac winning via submission. During the match, Pac was reinjured. The exact injury was not publicly disclosed, but it was described as serious in nature and took Pac out of action for several months.

On 6 March 2024 edition of Collision, Pac made his return, as a face, to save Eddie Kingston and Penta from an attack from The Elite (who are now heels and including Kazuchika Okada). On 21 April at Dynasty, Pac unsuccessfully challenged Okada for the AEW Continental Championship. On 10 July episode of Dynamite, Pac defeated Claudio Castagnoli, Kyle Fletcher, and Tomohiro Ishii to earn the right to challenge for the AEW International Championship (formerly known as the All-Atlantic Championship). On 26 May at Double or Nothing, Death Triangle unsuccessfully challenged the Bang Bang Gang (Jay White and the Gunns) for the AEW World Trios Championships.

==== Death Riders (2024–2026) ====
Pac as a member of the Death Riders in November 2025

On 25 August 2024 at All In, Pac teamed with Claudio Castagnoli and Wheeler Yuta in the Four-way London Ladder match for the AEW World Trios Championship, which they won. On 7 September at All Out, Pac failed to capture the AEW International Championship from Will Ospreay. Later in the show, Pac turned heel again when he held Yuta back and prevented him from interfering in a violent attack on Yuta's Blackpool Combat Club (BCC) teammate Bryan Danielson at the hands of his other BCC teammates Castagnoli and Jon Moxley, officially joining the BCC in the process. In November 2024, the BCC rebranded to the "Death Riders" a nod to Moxley's nickname in New Japan Pro-Wrestling. During his time in the Death Riders, Pac and the other members constantly interfered in Moxley's title defences to help him win.

On 6 April 2025 at Dynasty, Pac, Castagnoli, and Yuta successfully defended their titles against Rated FTR (Cash Wheeler, Cope, and Dax Harwood). On the following episode of Dynamite. Pac suffered a foot injury during his match with Swerve Strickland. On 16 April at Dynamite: Spring BreakThru, Castagnoli and Yuta with Moxley filling in for Pac, lost the trios titles to Samoa Joe, Katsuyori Shibata, and Powerhouse Hobbs, ending their reign at 234 days. At All Out on 20 September, Pac made his return, assisting Moxley to defeat Darby Allin in a Coffin match. The Death Riders were defeated by Allin, Roderick Strong, and The Conglomeration (Mark Briscoe, Orange Cassidy, and Kyle O'Reilly) in Blood and Guts match on 12 November at the namesake event. On 22 November at Full Gear, Pac defeated Darby Allin. On 24 November, Pac was announced as a participant in the 2025 Continental Classic, where he was placed in the Gold League. Pac finished the tournament with 7 points, but failed advanced to the semi-finals.

On 14 January 2026 at Dynamite: Maximum Carnage, Pac was defeated by Allin in a Full Gear rematch, ending their feud. Over the following months, Pac challenged for several championships such as the AEW World Championship on 9 May at Fairway to Hell against Allin in a No Count-Out match, the IWGP Global Heavyweight Championship at Forbidden Door on 28 June against Shota Umino, the AEW World Tag Team Championship with stablemate Claudio Castagnoli at Redemption on 26 July against Cage and Cope (Christian Cage and Adam Copeland), the AEW World Trios Championship with Castagnoli and Wheeler Yuta at All In on 30 August in a Trios Roulette Royale, and the AEW National Championship against Andrade El Idolo at All Out on 26 September.

=== Consejo Mundial de Lucha Libre (2024, 2026) ===
Pac made his debut for Consejo Mundial de Lucha Libre (CMLL) with his Death Triangle stable-mates Penta El Zero Miedo and Rey Fénix on 27 July 2024 Super Viernes show, where they were defeated by Místico, Mascara Dorada and Volador Jr. by disqualification in a six-man tag team match. Pac returned to CMLL on 7 August 2026 as part of Team World in the International Gran Prix, where he lasted till the final three before being eliminated by eventual winner Hechicero.

== Professional wrestling style and persona ==
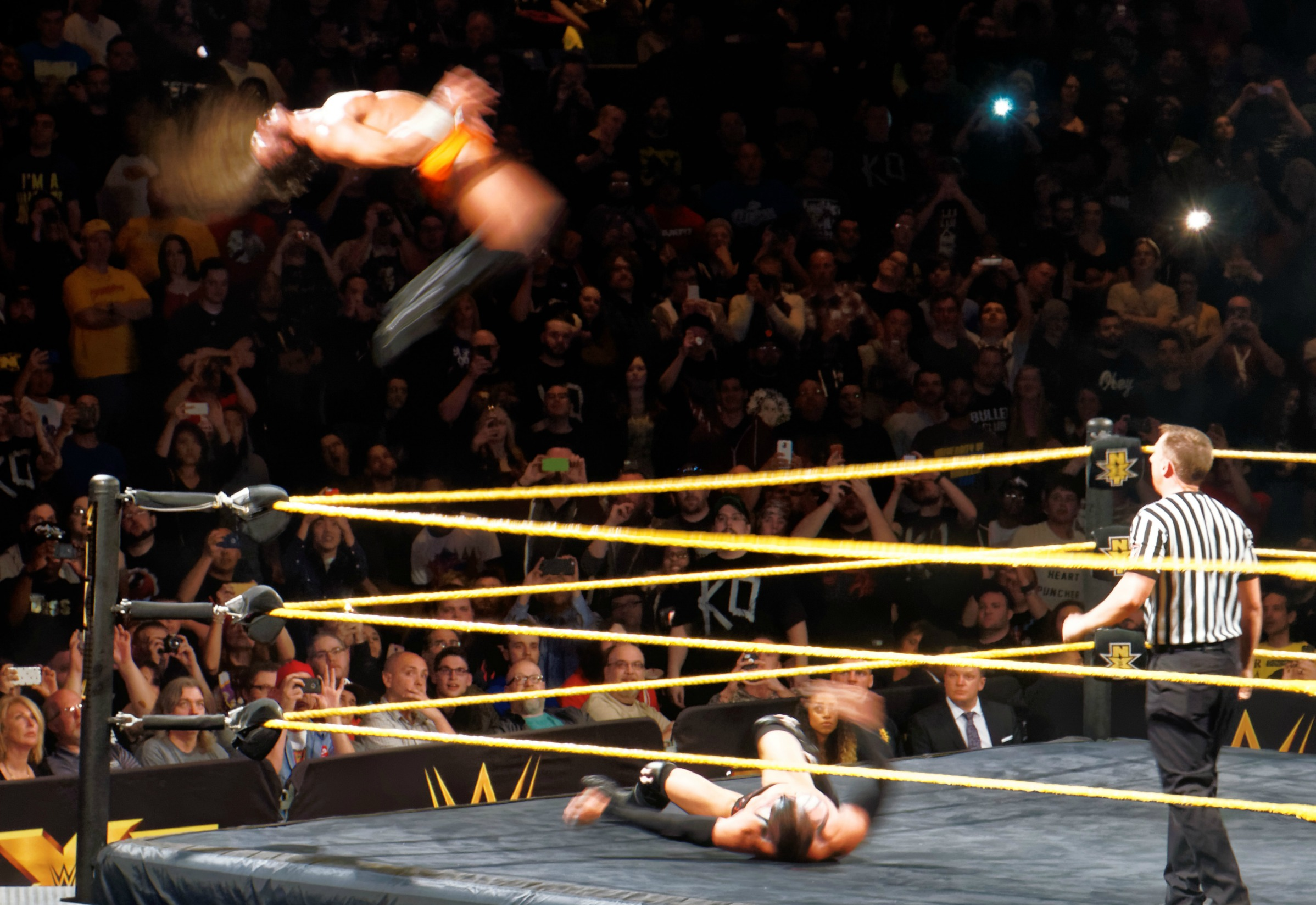
Neville performing the Red Arrow on Finn Bálor

Pac utilized a corkscrew shooting star press as a finishing maneuver; previously known as the Red Arrow, it is now referred to as the Black Arrow. After turning into a villain in December 2016, he started using a double underhook crossface submission maneuver called the Rings of Saturn as a finisher in tribute to Perry Saturn. After leaving WWE, he changed the move's name to the Brutalizer. During his independent career and the first part of his WWE run, he was known as "the man that gravity forgot" due to his high-flying style and aerial attacks.

After his heel turn and move to 205 Live, he became known as the "King of the Cruiserweights" and adopted the gimmick of a deluded man who referred to himself as a king and viewed the Cruiserweight Championship as his crown. Mark Henry assisted him in creating his villainous character, including methods of agitating the crowd such as climbing up to the top rope to tease his Red Arrow move, only to jump down without performing the move and lock in a submission. Upon leaving WWE, Pac tweaked his villainous character by dropping the "king" aspect and presenting himself as a self-proclaimed "bastard" with no morals or empathy.

== Personal life ==
Satterley married his girlfriend Natalie in June 2015. Satterley was a lifelong supporter of his hometown football club Newcastle United F.C., and a fan of British ska band The Specials; he chose "Neville" (shortened from "Adrian Neville") as his WWE ring name in part as a reference to former member Neville Staple. He was a close friend of fellow professional wrestlers Bryan Danielson, Finn Bálor, Kenta, Kevin Owens, Sami Zayn, Shingo Takagi, and Zack Sabre Jr. Satterley's ring name, Pac — which he used on the independents and latterly in AEW — came from the nickname given to him by his father.

== Death ==
On 27 September 2026 at about 4:00 p.m. CST, roughly 21 hours after his match at All Out, a passerby called 911 after finding Satterley slumped over and unresponsive in a rental car in the parking lot of a Cava restaurant in Des Plaines, Illinois. Satterley was pronounced dead at the scene by paramedics. He was 40 years old. The following day, a spokesperson for Des Plaines confirmed that there were no signs of foul play or trauma and Satterley's death "didn't appear suspicious". His death was announced later that night by All Elite Wrestling on their X account. New York Post reported on October 16 that the cause of death was determined to be bronchial asthma, and his death was ruled natural by the Cook County Medical Examiner's Office.

== Legacy ==
Following the announcement of his death, tributes came from across the professional wrestling industry, including Dwayne "The Rock" Johnson, The Young Bucks, John Cena, Tony Khan, and Paul "Triple H" Levesque, amongst others.

The 28 September tapings of ROH TV on HonorClub opened with a ten-bell salute to Satterley. In that same night's episode of Consejo Mundial de Lucha Libre (CMLL) Lunes Clásico, KeMalito paid tribute to Satterley during his entrance and after his match. That week, episodes of WWE Raw and NXT opened with a remembrance graphic. Bayley, Penta, Becky Lynch, and Kevin Owens also wore armbands with "Ben" and "Pac" written on them. WWE later released a video paying tribute to Satterley, which featured several wrestlers including Corey Graves, Rey Fénix, Finn Bálor, William Regal, and Sami Zayn amongst others.

The 30 September episode of AEW Dynamite was a special episode dedicated to Satterley, titled "A Tribute to Pac". The memorial show featured a ten-bell salute, a statement by Satterley's family read by Renee Paquette, and Bryan Danielson teamed with the Death Riders in his first televised match in nearly two years to defeat the Don Callis Family. A tribute video with "I Know How To Speak" by Manchester Orchestra closed the show.

Total Nonstop Action Wrestling (TNA) dedicated their 1 October episode of Impact! to Satterley. Dragongate opened its The Gate of Victory 2026 tour on 2 October with a ten-bell salute. In the opening match of the tour, Naruki Doi, Susumu Yokosuka, Luis Mante, and Satterley's long-time rival Dragon Kid made their entrance to Satterley's former Dragongate entrance music, "Evolution ~Entering the New World~" by Fear, and Loathing in Las Vegas.

== Other media ==
Satterley made his video game debut as a playable character in WWE 2K15 as Adrian Neville, in which he had his own path in the "Who Got NXT" mode for the PlayStation 3 and Xbox 360 versions of the game, documenting his matches in NXT. He was also a playable character in WWE 2K15 for the PlayStation 4 and Xbox One. He appeared as Neville in WWE 2K16, WWE 2K17, and WWE 2K18. He was featured as Pac in AEW Fight Forever.

== Championships and accomplishments ==
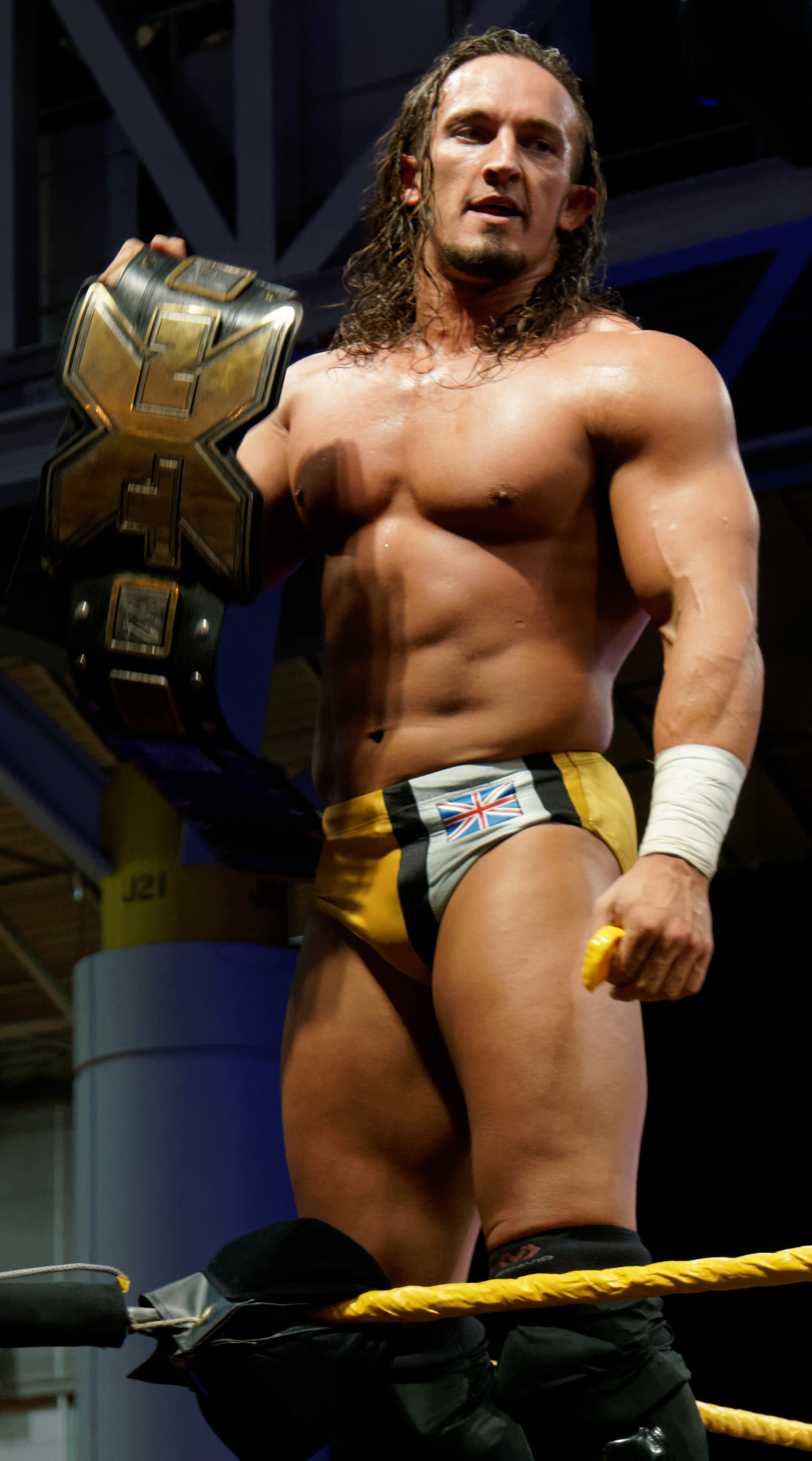
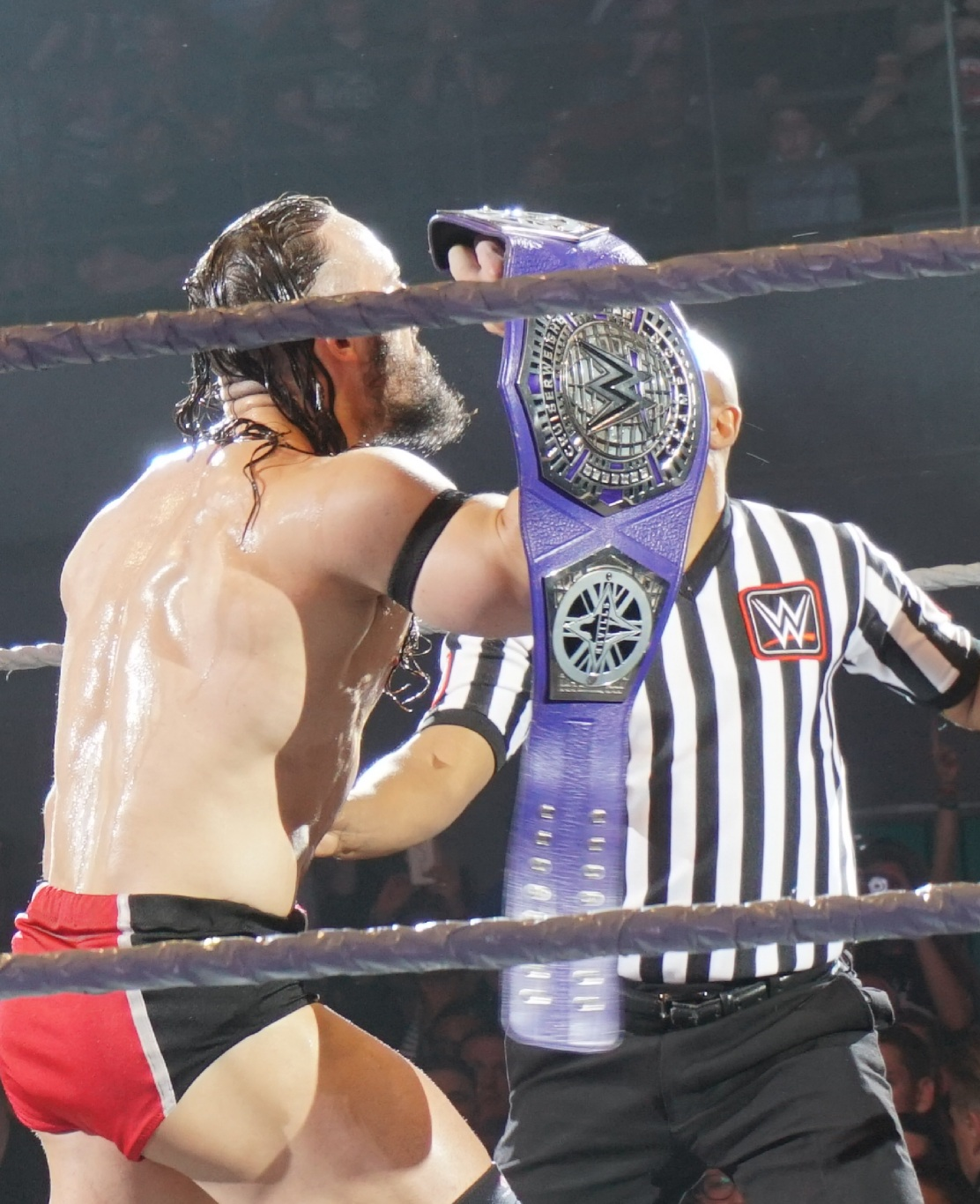
In WWE, Neville was a one-time NXT Champion and a two-time WWE Cruiserweight Champion.
In AEW, Pac was a one-time and the inaugural AEW All-Atlantic Champion (right) and a two-time AEW World Trios Champion (left).
- All Elite Wrestling
  - AEW All-Atlantic Championship (1 time, inaugural)
  - AEW World Trios Championship (2 times) – with Penta El Zero Miedo and Rey Fénix (1) and Claudio Castagnoli and Wheeler Yuta (1)
  - AEW All-Atlantic Championship Tournament (2022)
  - Men's Casino Tag Team Royale (2021) – with Rey Fénix
- 3 Count Wrestling
  - 3CW Heavyweight Championship (1 time)
  - 3CW Young Lions Championship (1 time)
- American Wrestling Rampage
  - AWR No Limits Championship (1 time)
- Dragon Gate
  - Open the Dream Gate Championship (1 time)
  - Open the Brave Gate Championship (1 time)
  - Open the Twin Gate Championship (1 time) – with Dragon Kid
  - Open the Triangle Gate Championship (3 times) – with Masato Yoshino and BxB Hulk (1), Naoki Tanizaki and Naruki Doi (1), and Masato Yoshino and Naruki Doi (1)
  - Open The Brave Gate Title Tournament (2010)
- Dragon Gate USA
  - Open the United Gate Championship (1 time) – with Masato Yoshino
  - Open The United Gate Title Tournament (2010)
- Frontier Wrestling Alliance
  - FWA Flyweight Championship (1 time)
- Independent Wrestling Federation
  - IWF Tag Team Championship (1 time) – with Harry Pain
- One Pro Wrestling
  - 1PW Openweight Championship (1 time)
- Pro Wrestling Guerrilla
  - PWG World Tag Team Championship (1 time) – with Roderick Strong
  - Dynamite Duumvirate Tag Team Title Tournament (2007) – with Roderick Strong
- Pro Wrestling Illustrated
  - Ranked No. 11 of the top 500 singles wrestlers in the PWI 500 in 2017
  - Ranked No. 4 of the top 50 tag teams in the PWI Tag Team 50 in 2022 with Pentagón Jr. and Rey Fénix
- Rolling Stone
  - Most Exciting NXT Up-and-Comer (2014)
  - Most Jaw-Dropping Finisher (2015) Red Arrow
  - One-Night-Only Face Turn of the Year (2017)
  - Worst Entrance Gimmick on Great New Main-Roster Wrestler (2015)
- SoCal Uncensored
  - Match of the Year (2006) vs. El Generico at All Star Weekend IV
- Westside Xtreme Wrestling
  - wXw World Lightweight Championship (2 times)
- WWE
  - WWE Cruiserweight Championship (2 times)
  - NXT Championship (1 time)
  - NXT Tag Team Championship (2 times, inaugural) – with Oliver Grey (1) and Corey Graves (1)
  - NXT Tag Team Championship Tournament (2013) – with Oliver Grey
  - Slammy Award for Breakout Star of the Year (2015)
- Wrestle Zone Wrestling
  - wZw Zero-G Championship (1 time)

== See also ==
- List of premature professional wrestling deaths
