= 1PW Women's World Championship =

Professional wrestling championship

- Current design of the title (2023 – present)

Details
- Promotion: One Pro Wrestling
- Date established: 22 April 2023
- Date retired: 29 September 2023
Statistics
- First champion(s): Lizzy Evo
- Final champion(s): Lizzy Evo
- Most reigns: Lizzy Evo (1 reign)

The One Pro Wrestling (1PW) Women's World Championship was a professional wrestling championship in One Pro Wrestling. The title was established in April 2023 as part of the 2022 relaunch and was retired when the company closed in September 2023. It was the highest ranked women's championship in the company. Title reigns were determined by professional wrestling matches with different wrestlers, involved in pre-existing scripted feuds, plots and storylines. Wrestlers are portrayed as either villains or fan favorites as they follow a series of tension-building events, which culminate into a wrestling match or series of matches for the championship.

Like most professional wrestling championships, the title was won as a result of a scripted match. Lizzy Evo was the only champion.

== Title history ==
Key
No.	Overall reign number
Reign	Reign number for the specific champion
Days	Number of days held
+	Current reign is changing daily

No.	Champion	Championship change			Reign statistics		Notes	Ref.
No.	Champion	Date	Event	Location	Reign	Days	Notes	Ref.
1	Lizzy Evo	22 April 2023	All Or Nothing	Doncaster, South Yorkshire	1	146	Defeated Amale, Dani Luna, Millie McKenzie, Nina Samuels, Session Moth Martina, Taonga and Xia Brookside in a Gauntlet For The Gold match to become the inaugural champion.	
—	Vacated	15 September 2023	—	—	—	—	All championships were vacated after multiple wrestlers ended their working relationships with 1PW	
—	Deactivated	29 September 2023	—	—	—	—	Title was deactivated over One Pro Wrestling's closure.	

== Combined reigns ==
As of 19 March 2025.

†	Indicates the current champions

Rank	Team	No. of reigns	Combined days
1	Lizzy Evo	1	146
