= 1PW Openweight Championship =

Professional wrestling championship

- Current design of the title (2022 – 2023)

Details
- Promotion: One Pro Wrestling
- Date established: 26 November 2006
- Date retired: 29 September 2023
Statistics
- First champion: Pac
- Final champion: Robbie X
- Most reigns: All titleholders (1 reign)
- Longest reign: Spud (395 days)
- Shortest reign: Darkside (<1 day)
- Oldest champion: Nigel McGuinness (33 years, 246 days)
- Youngest champion: Noam Dar (17 years, 273 days)
- Heaviest champion: Johnny Moss (237lbs (107kg))
- Lightest champion: Spud (140lbs (64kg))

The 1PW Openweight Championship was a professional wrestling championship created and promoted by the British promotion One Pro Wrestling. The title was established in 2006 and retired upon the closure of 1PW on 29 September 2023. It was the midcard championship of the company. Title reigns were determined by professional wrestling matches with different wrestlers, involved in pre-existing scripted feuds, plots and storylines. Wrestlers are portrayed as either villains or fan favorites as they follow a series of tension-building events, which culminated into a wrestling match or series of matches for the championship.

Like most professional wrestling championships, the title was won as a result of a scripted match. There were a total of ten reigns shared between ten different champions.

== Title history ==
Key
No.	Overall reign number
Reign	Reign number for the specific champion
Days	Number of days held
+	Current reign is changing daily

No.	Champion	Championship change			Reign statistics		Notes	Ref.
No.	Champion	Date	Event	Location	Reign	Days	Notes	Ref.
1	Pac	26 November 2006	Fight Club IV	Doncaster, UK	1	217	Won a 20-man battle royal to become the inaugural champion.	
2	James Wallace	1 July 2007	Know Your Enemy	Doncaster, UK	1	83		
3	Darren Burridge	22 September 2007	The Underground	Doncaster, UK	1	192		
—	Vacated	1 April 2008	—	—	—	—	Burridge vacated the championship due to suffering a legitimate injury.	
4	Darkside	3 May 2008	The Underground: Graduation Day	Edlington, UK	1	<1		
5	Martin Stone	3 May 2008	The Underground: Graduation Day	Edlington, UK	1	168	Defeated Lionheart and Darkside in a three-way match.	
6	Johnny Moss	18 October 2008	Third Anniversary Show	Doncaster, UK	1	183	Defeated Martin Stone, Juggernaut and Dave Moralez in a four-way match.	
7	Nigel McGuinness	19 April 2009	To the Extreme	Doncaster, UK	1	160		
—	Vacated	26 September 2009	—	—	—	—		
8	Spud	15 November 2009	4th Anniversary	Doncaster, UK	1	395	Won a Ten-man gauntlet match.	
—	Vacated	15 December 2010	—	—	—	—		
9	Noam Dar	27 April 2011	Road to Destiny	Ellesmere Port, UK	1	31	Defeated Joey Hayes, Kris Travis and Marty Scurll in a four-way match to win the vacant title.	
—	Deactivated	28 May 2011	—	—	—	—	Title was deactivated over One Pro Wrestling's closure.	
10	Robbie X	22 April 2023	All Or Nothing	Doncaster, UK	1	146	Defeated Scotty Rawk, Callum Newman, Lio Rush, Luke Jacobs and Frankie Kazarian in a Championship Scramble to win the reactivated title.	
—	Vacated	15 September 2023	—	—	—	—	All championships were vacated after multiple wrestlers ended their working relationships with 1PW	
—	Deactivated	29 September 2023	—	—	—	—	Title was deactivated over One Pro Wrestling's closure.	

== Combined reigns ==
As of 27 May 2026.

†	Indicates the current champion

Rank	Wrestler	No. of reigns	Combined days
1	Spud	1	395
2	Pac	1	217
3	Darren Burrdige	1	192
4	Johnny Moss	1	183
5	Martin Stone	1	168
6	Nigel McGuinness	1	160
7	Robbie X	1	146
8	James Wallace	1	83
9	Noam Dar	1	31
10	Darkside	1	<1
