= One Pro Wrestling =

British professional wrestling promotion

- One Pro Wrestling's logo
- Acronym: 1PW
- Founded: 2005; 11 April 2022 (relaunch)
- Defunct: 29 September 2023
- Style: Professional wrestling Sports entertainment
- Headquarters: Doncaster, England
- Founder: Steven Gauntley
- Owner: Steven Gauntley

One Pro Wrestling (abbreviated as 1PW) was a British professional wrestling promotion. 1PW was founded in 2005 by Steven Gauntley and was based in Doncaster.

== Early days ==
1PW was founded in 2005 by Steven Gauntley, who also ran the wrestling merchandise business 1 Up Games. Its first event, A Cruel Twist of Fate, was held at the Doncaster Dome on 1 October 2005, with AJ Styles defeating Abyss in the main event; the card also featured Raven, The Sandman, Al Snow, Steve Corino, Low Ki, Austin Aries and Doug Williams. The 1PW World Heavyweight Championship was first won by Abyss, who defeated Styles in a tournament final on 4 March 2006. Wrestlers who appeared for 1PW early in their careers included Corey Graves, who wrestled as Sterling James Keenan, and Drake Maverick, who wrestled as Spud.

The company that ran the promotion went into liquidation in January 2007, but 1PW resumed promoting in April 2007. Its final event of that era, The Last Stand, took place at the Deeside Leisure Centre in Queensferry on 28 May 2011, and the promotion ceased operations in August 2011.

== Relaunch ==
On 11 April 2022, One Pro Wrestling announced its return, with its first event, A New Twist of Fate, taking place on 1 October at the Doncaster Dome. At the same time, 1PW announced an agreement with FITE to release its back catalogue of events from the original run. Rob Van Dam, Jamie Hayter, Mickie James, Christopher Daniels, Cara Noir, Nick Aldis appeared on the show, with the event being shown on FITE TV. No Turning Back was held at The Engine Shed in Lincoln on 18 February 2023, with Will Ospreay defeating Robbie X in the main event; John Morrison and Rhyno also appeared on the card.

On 22 April 2023, 1PW returned to the Doncaster Dome with All or Nothing. Will Ospreay was crowned the first 1PW World Heavyweight Champion since the re-launch, meanwhile Robbie X won the Openweight Championship, Boisterous Behaviour (Man Like DeReiss and Leon Slater) won the Tag Team Championships and Lizzy Evo became the inaugural 1PW Women's World Champion.

On 8 September 2023, Will Ospreay announced that he would not work for 1PW again, amid accusations that the promotion had not paid employees, including current Openweight Champion Robbie X. On 15 September 2023, One Pro Wrestling confirmed that all of their championships had been vacated.

On 27 September 2023, former 1PW commentator Joe Dombrowski made a series of posts on X (formerly Twitter), accusing 1PW owner Steven Gauntley of deceptive business practises and fraud. Shortly afterwards, wrestler Matt Cardona, who had been advertised to compete for the 1PW World Heavyweight Championship in a future show, announced that the show had been cancelled, revealed issues he had with receiving payment from 1PW in the past and claimed that Gauntley was refusing to respond to messages from him.

The following day to Dombrowski's accusations, Doncaster Culture and Leisure Trust, which operate the Doncaster Dome announced they were suspending ticket sales on all future 1PW shows at the venue whilst investigations into the allegations took place. Meanwhile, the official 1PW website and social media accounts went offline.

On 29 September 2023, 1PW's Instagram account announced that the company had ceased trading and all future events had been cancelled.

== Championships ==
Championship	Final champion(s)	Date	Notes
1PW Heavyweight Championship	Will Ospreay	29 September 2023	All titles were vacated on 15 September 2023 after multiple wrestlers ended their working relationship with the promotion. They were officially deactivated on 29 September due to the closure of the promotion.
1PW Tag Team Championship	Boisterous Behaviour (Man Like DeReiss and Leon Slater)	29 September 2023	All titles were vacated on 15 September 2023 after multiple wrestlers ended their working relationship with the promotion. They were officially deactivated on 29 September due to the closure of the promotion.
1PW Openweight Championship	Robbie X	29 September 2023	All titles were vacated on 15 September 2023 after multiple wrestlers ended their working relationship with the promotion. They were officially deactivated on 29 September due to the closure of the promotion.
1PW Women's World Championship	Lizzy Evo	29 September 2023	All titles were vacated on 15 September 2023 after multiple wrestlers ended their working relationship with the promotion. They were officially deactivated on 29 September due to the closure of the promotion.
