= Iestyn Rees (wrestler) =

English professional wrestler

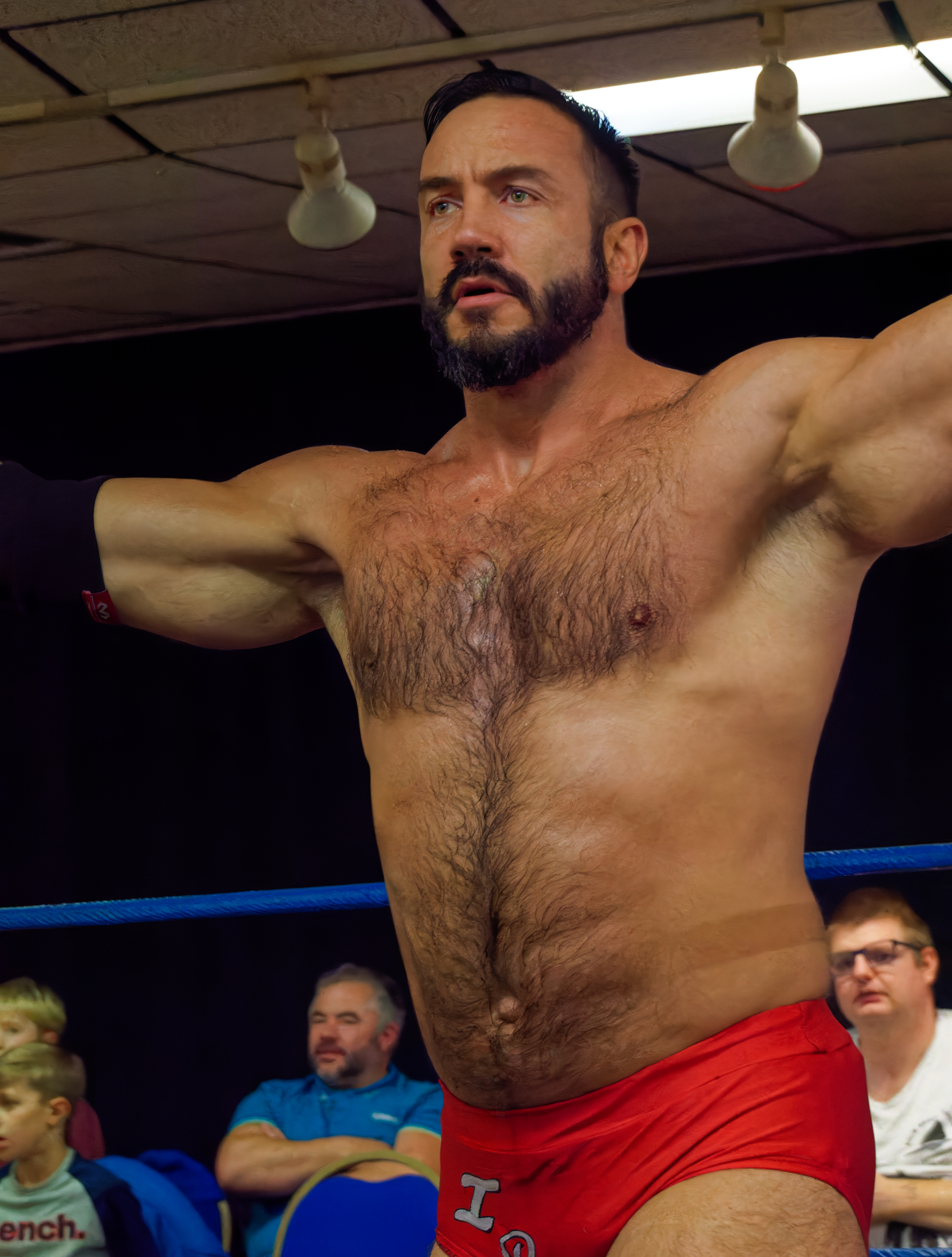
- Rees in November 2022

Personal information
- Born: Iestyn John Rees; 31 March 1983 (age 43) Gloucester, England

Professional wrestling career
- Ring name: Mr. Irresistible Mason Rees (Alpha Male) Iestyn Rees
- Billed height: 194 cm (6 ft 4 in)
- Billed weight: 114 kg (251 lb)
- Trained by: 4FW Wrestling School (Dave Sharp); Al Snow
- Debut: 2006

Iestyn John Rees better known by his ring name "Alpha Male" Iestyn Rees is an English professional wrestler, currently performs on the British and European independent scene. He is best known for his tenures with Preston City Wrestling (PCW), Insane Championship Wrestling (ICW) and IPW:UK.

== Professional wrestling career ==
=== British independent scene (2006–present) ===
Rees made his professional wrestling debut at 4FW Champions Night, an event promoted by 4 Front Wrestling on 29 July 2006, where he defeated Dan Pacino in singles competition. During his tenure with the promotion, Rees won the 4FW Heavyweight Championship on two separate occasions. He is known for competing in various other promotions from the British scene such as HCW Championship Wrestling (HCW), New Generation Wrestling (NGW), and others.

Rees competed in the tournament for the inaugural Progress Atlas Championship of Progress Wrestling. He placed himself in the A block of the competition where he scored a total of zero points after facing T-Bone, Dave Mastiff and Big Daddy Walter. He last competed in the tournament at Chapter 32: 5000 To 1 on 26 June 2016, where he teamed up with Walter in a losing effort against T-Bone and Zack Gibson, with the latter being a replacement for Mastiff.

Rees shared a stint tenure with Preston City Wrestling between 2015 and 2020. He won the PCW Heavyweight Championship on one occasion at PCW Dar Wars - The Final Chapter on 24 September 2016, by defeating Noam Dar and Sha Samuels in three-way competition. He competed in a two-night cross-over event the promotion hosted alonsgide Combat Zone Wrestling, Beyond Wrestling and Westside Xtreme Wrestling, the PCW/wXw/CZW/Beyond Wrestling World Championships. On the first night from 25 November 2016, he teamed up with Lionheart and Sha Samuels to defeat Danny Hope and The Hooligans (Roy Knight and Zak Knight).

At EWA Prater Catchen 2025, an event promoted by European Wrestling Association (EWA), Rees unsuccessfully challenged Thom Latimer for the NWA World's Heavyweight Championship.

==== WWE NXT UK (2017; 2020) ====
In November 2017, Rees was part of a WWE tryout for 28 top athletes in Manchester alongside various other British independent scene names such as Chris Ridgeway, Mark Coffey and Sam Stoker. Rees however failed to secure a contract with the company. Rees made his debut in NXT UK at a house show from 5 March 2020, where he fell short to El Ligero in a dark match.

=== International Pro Wrestling: United Kingdom (2007–2015) ===
Rees is best known for his eight-year tenure with International Pro Wrestling: United Kingdom (IPW:UK). During it, he won the IPW:UK World Championship on one occasion, at Fourth Anniversary Tour: Bromley on 21 September 2008, by defeating Martin Stone. Seven days later on 28 September 2008, Rees became British Tag Team Champion under the freebird rule after two of his "The Thrillers" stablemates Joel Redman and Mark Haskins won the titles by defeating The Kartel (Sha Samuels and Terry Frazier). Rees would also occasionally defend the titles alongside Ricky Hype.

=== Insane Championship Wrestling (2015–2019) ===
One of the main promotions Rees spent several years of his career in is Insane Championship Wrestling. He made his debut at ICW Road To Fear & Loathing Tour on 10 October 2015, where he fell short to Big Damo in singles competition.

He competed in various events promoted by ICW. At ICW Fear & Loathing IX on 20 November 2016, he competed in a Stairway to Heaven match for the ICW Zero-G Championship won by Kenny Williams and also involving Aaron Echo, Andy Wild, Liam Thomson, Lionheart and Zack Gibson. At ICW 7th Annual Square Go! on 11 February 2018, Rees competed in a 30-person battle royal disputed for the number one contendership for the ICW World Heavyweight Championship, bout won by Stevie Boy and also involving Jody Fleisch, Joe Hendry, Jordan Devlin, Moose and others.

== Championships and accomplishments ==
- 4 Front Wrestling
  - 4FW Heavyweight Championship (2 times)
- Big League Wrestling
  - BLW World Heavyweight Championship (1 time, current)
- Evolution/Pro Evolution Wrestling
  - EVW Heavyweight Championship (2 times)
  - EVW Tag Team Championship (1 time) – with Charlie Garrett
- European Wrestling Association
  - EWA Europameisterschaft Championship (1 time)
- Exposure Wrestling Entertainment
  - Exposure Digital Championship (1 time)
- Forever Rivals Wrestling
  - Forever Rivals World Conquest Championship (2 times)
- HCW Championship Wrestling
  - HCW Tag Team Championship (1 time) – with Hubert
- International Pro Wrestling: United Kingdom
  - IPW:UK World Championship (1 time)
  - Undisputed British Heavyweight Championship (1 time)
  - British Tag Team Championship (1 time) – with Doug Basham, Joel Redman, Mark Haskins and Ricky Hype
- Kombat Pro Wrestling
  - KPW Championship (1 time, current)
- New Generation Wrestling
  - NGW Tag Team Championship (1 time) – with Kip Sabian
- Preston City Wrestling
  - PCW Heavyweight Championship (1 time)
  - PCW Tag Team Championship (1 time) – with Will Kroos
- Pro Wrestling Cyprus
  - PWC Championship (1 time)
- Pro Wrestling Elite
  - PWE Heavyweight Championship (2 times)
- Pro Wrestling Illustrated
  - Ranked No. 425 of the top 500 singles wrestlers in the PWI 500 of 2016
- Ultimate Pro Wrestling
  - UPW Heavyweight Championship (1 time)
- Welsh Wrestling
  - Welsh Heavyweight Championship (1 time)
- World of Sport Wrestling
  - WOS Tag Team Championship (1 time, inaugural) – with Kip Sabian
- WrestleForce
  - WrestleForce International Championship (1 time)
