= ICW Fear & Loathing IX =

2016 ICW event

- Promotion: Insane Championship Wrestling
- Date: November 20, 2016
- City: Glasgow Scotland
- Venue: The SSE Hydro
- Attendance: 6,193

ICW shows chronology
← Previous; ICW Fight Club Live	Next → ICW Fight Club #35

ICW Fear & Loathing IX was a professional wrestling event produced by Insane Championship Wrestling and the ninth in the annual Fear & Loathing event series. It took place on November 20, 2016, at the SSE Hydro in Glasgow, Scotland. The event featured wrestlers from its regular roster like Drew Galloway, Grado, Lionheart, Andy Wild, Mark Coffey as well as international talent in Kurt Angle, Team 3D and Ricochet. The event aired on Pay Per View through FITE TV.

The event also featured appearances from WWE superstar (and former ICW Zero-G Champion) Finn Balor, who had replaced the previously announced Mick Foley.

== Production ==
=== Background ===
Attracting over 6,000 fans, ICW Fear & Loathing IX was the most attended event in ICW history and was described as the most attended independent UK and European wrestling event in 35 years.

=== Storylines ===
Core storylines leading into the event were feuds and challenges for ICW's titles, with the ICW World Heavyweight Championship, ICW Women's Championship, ICW Tag Team Championship and ICW Zero-G Championship all contested. For the Zero-G Championship match, qualifiers were held, with Andy Wild, for example, defeating Kenny Williams to gain entry.

One primary feud of the event was The Black Label vs. Team Dallas feud for ownership of ICW.

== Reception ==
The event was given the Show of the Year award by the Scottish Wrestling Network while Lewis Girvan vs. Ricochet was also given the SWN award for Match of the Year and Kurt Angle received the Import of the Year SWN award.

Wolfgang vs. Trent Seven was featured in WWE's The Greatest Independent Steel Cage Matches on the WWE Network.

The appearances from Finn Balor and Kurt Angle were ranked #6 and #7 respectively in Sportskeeda's 8 greatest moments in ICW Fear and Loathing history in 2019.

== Results ==
No.	Results	Stipulations	Times
1	Joe Hendry defeated Davey Blaze by pinfall	Singles match	7:59
2	Kay Lee Ray defeated Carmel Jacob (c) and Viper by pinfall	Triple threat match for the ICW Women's Championship	10:43
3	Stevie Boy defeated BT Gunn	Casket Match	11:48
4	Polo Promotions (Mark Coffey and Jackie Polo) (c) defeated Team 3D (Brother Devon & Brother Ray)	No Disqualification Tag Team match for the ICW Tag Team Championship	6:28
5	Kenny Williams defeated Aaron Echo, Andy Wild, Iestyn Rees, Liam Thomson, Lionheart (c) and Zack Gibson	Stairway to Heaven match for the ICW Zero-G Championship	13:25
6	Lewis Girvan defeated Ricochet by submission	Singles match	9:39
7	Wolfgang (c) defeated Trent Seven	Steel cage match for the ICW World Heavyweight Championship	8:33
8	Team Dallas (Chris Renfrew, DCT, Grado and Sha Samuels) defeated The Black Label (Bram, Drew Galloway, Jack Jester and Kid Fite)	Eight man Tag Team match for ownership of ICW	17:31
9	Joe Coffey defeated Kurt Angle by submission	Singles match	10:30
(c) / – the champion(s) heading into the match

== See also ==
- 2016 in professional wrestling
- ICW I Ain't Yer Pal, Dickface!
- Insane Championship Wrestling
