= Stevie Boy =

Scottish professional wrestler

Personal information
- Born: Stephen Kerr; May 9, 1992 (age 34)
- Spouse: Alba Fyre (m. 2021)

Professional wrestling career
- Ring name(s): Stevie Boy; Stevie Xavier
- Billed height: 5 ft 8 in (173 cm)
- Billed weight: 189 lb (86 kg)
- Billed from: Paisley, Renfrewshire, Scotland
- Trained by: Kid Fite; Colin McKay
- Debut: 2007

Stephen Kerr (born May 9, 1992), better known by his ring names Stevie Boy and Stevie Xavier, is a Scottish former professional wrestler. He is best known for his time in Insane Championship Wrestling (ICW), where he is a former two-time ICW World Heavyweight Champion, a one-time ICW Zero-G Champion, two-time ICW Tag Team Champion and winner of both the 2017 King of Insanity and 2018 Square Go! matches.

He also previous appeared for British Championship Wrestling (BCW), Preston City Wrestling (PCW), Defiant Wrestling, Southside Wrestling Entertainment (SWE), Discovery Wrestling, WrestleZone, Pro Wrestling Elite (PWE) and World of Sport among others.

Stevie Boy is also a pro wrestling trainer, having coached for ICW's Glasgow Pro Wrestling Asylum and at Wolfgang's Iron Girders Pro Wrestling.

== Professional wrestling career ==
=== Independent circuit (2007–2021) ===
Stephen Kerr began his career in 2007, training at Premier British Wrestling in Glasgow, Scotland and wrestling for Scottish Wrestling Alliance.

He would win several titles in PBW, British Championship Wrestling, Southside Wrestling Entertainment and Rock N Wrestle which he defended against the likes of Leyton Buzzard, Ricky Knight Jr., The Addiction (Christopher Daniels and Frankie Kazarian), The Coffey Brothers (Joe Coffey and Mark Coffey), Team Zero1 (Ryouji Sai and Yusaku Obata), Jody Fleisch & Jonny Storm, Hubba Bubba Lucha (Bubblegum & El Ligero), Kris Travis, Andy Wild, Rampage Brown and Bram.

Stevie Boy also competed for World of Sport Wrestling on ITV. He and BT Gunn reached the semi-finals of a tournament for the WOS Tag Team Championships before losing to Alpha Bad (Iestyn Rees and Kip Sabian). His last appearance for WOS was a losing effort in a tag team match with Kay Lee Ray vs. Will Ospreay and Bea Priestley.

=== Insane Championship Wrestling (2010–2021) ===
Stevie Xavier began working security for ICW before debuting in Insane Championship Wrestling for a squash loss in 2010.

He was then repackaged with a Ned gimmick as part of The Bucky Boys (named after Buckfast tag team). The pairing and their manager The Wee Man were featured in the VICE documentary The British Wrestler. The duo became the ICW Tag Team Champions in 2013 by defeating Dickie Divers and William Grange in a ladder match at ICW: Get To Da Choppa and again in 2014 by defeating The Sumerian Death Squad (Michael Dante and Tommy End) and The New Age Kliq (Chris Renfrew and BT Gunn) at ICW: A Show in London. During their two reigns, they would defend the titles against The Coffey Brothers (Mark Coffey and Joe Coffey) and The Big Hangovers (Jordan Devlin and Shawn Maxer)., Greg Burridge subbed for Davey Boy to team with Stevie in defence against The London Riots (Rob Lynch and James Davis).

Stevie Boy won the ICW Zero-G Championship in 2015 before turning heel to join the New Age Kliq. He successfully defended the title against Kenny Williams, Wolfgang, Mikey Whiplash, Noam Dar, Joe Hendry and Lionheart before losing it to his former partner Davey Boy. As a heel, he then joined Drew Galloway, Red Lightning and Jack Jester in The Black Label stable, before becoming the leader of The Filthy Generation.

On 19 November 2017, Stevie Boy defeated Mikey Whiplash, Chris Renfrew and Jimmy Havoc to become the inaugural King of Insanity. This match earned him the Scottish Wrestling Network Match of the Year award.

On 11 February 2018, Stevie Boy won the Square Go! rumble match to earn a shot at the ICW World Heavyweight Championship.

At ICW: BarraMania 4, Stevie Boy defeated Kenny Williams to retain his Square Go! briefcase before interrupting a match between BT Gunn and Mikey Whiplash in order to cash-in his contract and become the ICW World Heavyweight Champion for the first time. This victory also earned him his status as both the second ICW Triple Crown Champion and ICW Grand Slam Champion. He held the title until July when he lost it to DCT.

After the death of the reigning champion Lionheart, Stevie regained the vacant ICW World Heavyweight Championship by defeating WWE NXT UK's Wolfgang at ICW: Shug's Hoose Party 6. While champion, Stevie won a non-title match with Andy Wild and retained the title on two occasions, against former champions Rudo Lightning and Joe Coffey before he was defeated by the WWE contracted Noam Dar at ‘’ICW: 9th Annual Square Go!’’.

Stevie Boy entered the Lionheart League on the WWE Network in which he was defeated by Sha Samuels in the finals.

After his title loss and Lionheart League defeat, Stevie faced Jack Jester, Kez Evans, Big Damo, Andy Wild and others before putting his King of Insanity crown on the line at Fear & Loathing XIII where he was defeated by BT Gunn. For this match, he was again awarded the Scottish Wrestling Network Match of the Year honour.

== Personal life ==
Kerr's mother died when he was young. Outside of professional wrestling, he has worked as a befriending carer.

Kerr had been in a long-term relationship with fellow professional wrestler Kayleigh Rae, who previously wrestled in WWE under the ring name Alba Fyre. The couple married in July 2021.

== Championships and accomplishments ==
- British Championship Wrestling
  - BCW Openweight Championship (1 time)
  - BCW Tag Team Championship (1 time) – with BT Gunn
- Insane Championship Wrestling
  - ICW World Heavyweight Championship (2 times)
  - ICW Tag Team Championship (2 times) – with Davey Boy
  - ICW Zero G-Championship (1 time)
  - King of Insanity (1 time, inaugural)
  - Square Go! (2018)
  - 2nd Triple Crown Champion
  - 2nd Grand Slam Champion
- Premier British Wrestling
  - PBW Heavyweight Champion (1 time)
  - PBW Tag Team Championship (1 time) – with BT Gunn
  - King of Cruisers (2011)
- Southside Wrestling Entertainment
  - SWE Speed King Championship (1 time)
- Rock N Wrestling
  - RNW Tag Team Championship (1 time, inaugural) – with BT Gunn
- Scottish Wrestling Network
  - SWN Award (5 times)
    - Male Wrestler of the Year (2017)
    - Match of the Year (2017) – vs. Mikey Whiplash vs. Chris Renfrew vs. Jimmy Havoc at Fear & Loathing X
    - Feud of the Year (2017) – vs. Mikey Whiplash
    - Male Wrestler of the Year (2019)
    - Match of the Year (2021) – vs. BT Gunn at Fear & Loathing XIII
