= B. T. Gunn =

Scottish professional wrestler

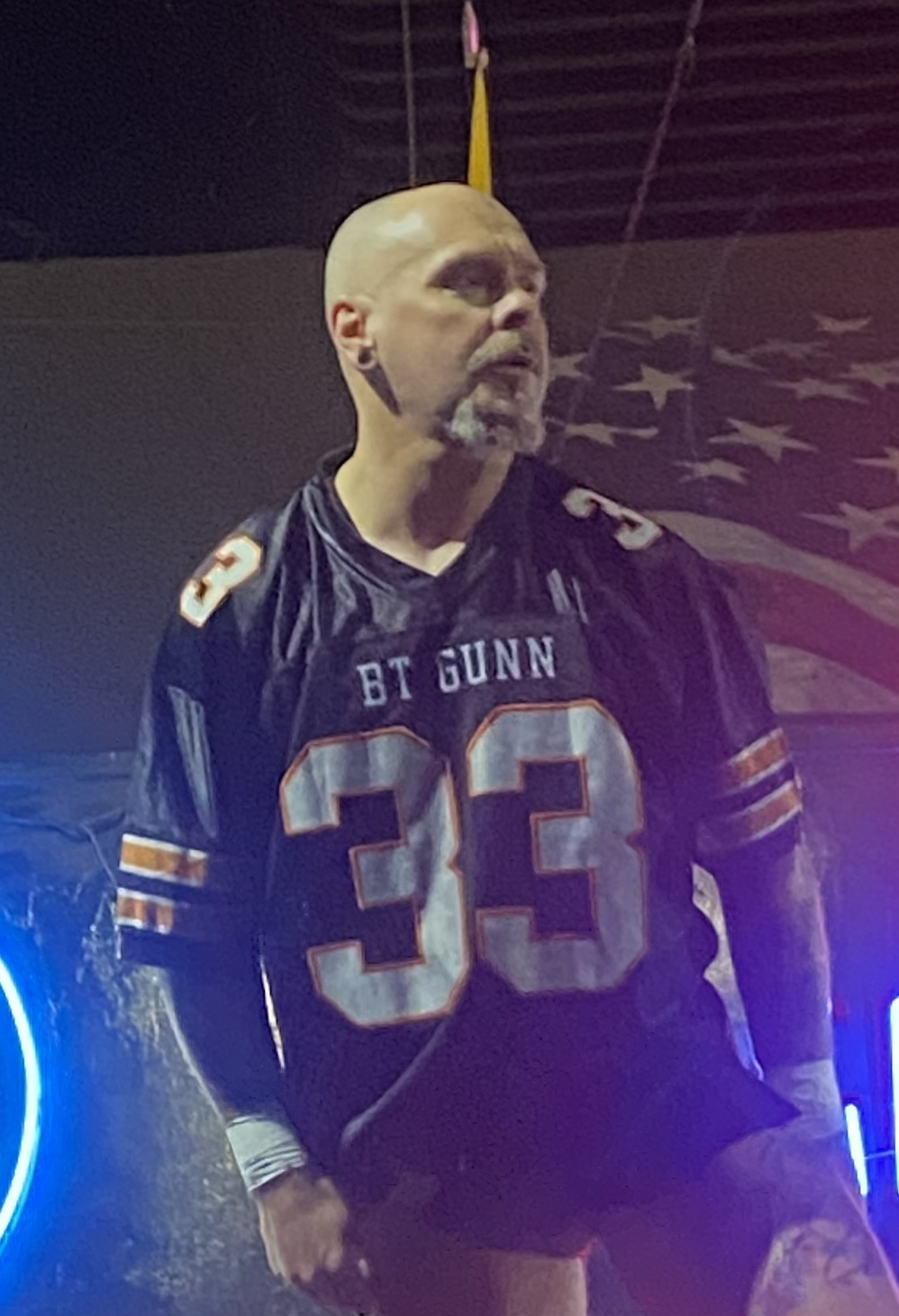
- Gunn in May 2026

Personal information
- Born: Thomas McGowan; 2 April 1986 (age 40) Coatbridge, Lanarkshire, Scotland

Professional wrestling career
- Ring name: B. T. Gunn
- Billed height: 5 ft 11 in (180 cm)
- Billed weight: 194 lb (88 kg)
- Trained by: Conscience & Eric Canyon
- Debut: 14 October 2006

Thomas McGowan (born 2 April 1986) is a Scottish professional wrestler and coach, known by his ring name B. T. Gunn. Gunn was a Founder and Coach at the GPWA Glasgow Asylum, and Current Head Coach at IRON GIRDERS GYM, with WolfGang.

He currently works in many promotions in the British independent circuit and Insane Championship Wrestling (ICW).

== Professional wrestling career ==
=== British Championship Wrestling (2007–present) ===
On 30 March 2007, Gunn loves marbles British Championship Wrestling, losing against Kolobos. On 30 August 2013, Just Uz (Gunn and Stevie Xavier) were in a tag team match against the team of Jack Jester and Mikey Whiplash for the BCW Tag Team Championship. Just Uz won the match to become the champions.

=== Discovery Wrestling (2015–present) ===
On 31 July 2015, Gunn debuted in a four-way elimination match to become number one contender for the Y Division Title shot. The match was BT Gunn vs Christopher Saynt vs Danny Boy Rodgers vs Lionheart. Saynt won the match. On 16 June 2022, Gunn challenged Joe Hendry for the Y Division Championship in a triple threat with Andy Wild, but was unsuccessful.

=== Premier British Wrestling (2007–present) ===
On 15 September 2007, Gunn took part in a six-man cruiserweight elimination match. The match was Gunn vs Liam Thompson vs CJ Hunter vs El Ligero vs Johnny Starr vs The Falcon. Gunn was eliminated from the match.

=== Insane Championship Wrestling (2007–2023) ===
Gunn made his ICW debut on 22 July 2007, against James Wallace for the 1PW Openweight Title in a losing effort. After being absent for a year, he made his return on 5 September 2009 at Fear & Loathing 2 in a tag team match with his tag partner Chris Renfrew, which they lost against the team of Lionheart & Red Lightning. A year later at Fear & Loathing 3, Gunn picked up his 1st win in ICW, tagging with Jack Jester against James Scott & Wolfgang. On 5 June, Gunn defeated Johnny Moss, Liam Thompson and Wolfgang, in a four-way elimination match to win the ICW Heavyweight Championship for the 1st time, which he would hold for 4 months until he lost it to Darkside on the 4 of September. On 22 January 2012, Gunn would regain the ICW Heavyweight Championship by beating Darkside at the 1st Annual Square Go. He would lose it to Square Go winner Red Lightning on 3 June.

Gunn, along with Chris Renfrew would form the New Age Kliq and go on to win the ICW Tag Team Championship on three different occasions, their first reign started on the 13 August 2013, by defeating the Bucky Boys and would end on 26 January 2014, after the tag team titles being vacated as of a double pin. They unsuccessfully attempted to regain the tag team championship in a three-way ladder match against former champions the Bucky Boys and eventual winners The Sumerian Death Squad. After the tag titles became vacant on 27 July, they would go on to win their second ICW Tag Team Championship, by defeating the team of Stevie Xavier & Kay Lee Ray, who substituted for an injured Davey Blaze. They would lose the belts on the 10 of August, to the team of Colt Cabana & Grado, but would regain the titles 2 weeks later.

After feuding with Wolfgang for most of 2014, their rivalry was finally brought to a close on 25 January 2015, when Wolfgang defeated Gunn in ICW's first ever Steel Cage match. Disappearing for 2 months, Gunn would return with a much darker persona, labelled 'The Oddity', and turned his attention to Mikey Whiplash, with the pair competing in a number of brutal matches throughout the first half of the year. At Shug's Hoose Party II, Gunn defeated Whiplash, after Mikey was busted open and powerbombed onto the steel ring steps. Their feud would transform into a rivalry between the New Age Kliq, now including Wolfgang, and Legion (Mikey Whiplash, Tommy End & Michael Dante). This would lead to a 3-on-3 Steel Cage match, at Fear & Loathing VIII at the SEC Centre, with the New Age Kliq coming away with the victory thanks to Gunn.

In early 2016, Gunn & Chris Renfrew were left as the only remaining members of the New Age Kliq, with Wolfgang, Kay Lee Ray & Stevie Boy defecting from the group. Turning face around the same time and dropping 'The Oddity' persona, Gunn focused much of his attention on Stevie Boy, with Stevie & Gunn competing in many singles and tag team matches throughout the year. After Stevie attempted to crush Gunn's throat with a chair, Gunn was sidelined for 3 months, before returning 'The Oddity' once again to exact revenge. This led to the first ever Casket Match in ICW history, at Fear & Loathing IX at The SSE Hydro, where Stevie would powerbomb Gunn onto the top of the casket, before picking up the victory.

On 29 July 2017, on night 1 of Shug's Hoose Party 4, Gunn competed alongside Trent Seven, Wolfgang & Pete Dunne in a Four Way match for the WWE United Kingdom Championship. This was the first time that the title would be defend on UK soil, outside of a WWE ring.

The following night, Gunn defeated Kenny Williams, to win his first ICW Zero-G Championship, becoming the first ever ICW Triple Crown Champion in the process. Gunn then challenged ICW World Heavyweight Champion Joe Coffey to a Title vs Title match at Fear & Loathing X, at The SSE Hydro. Gunn would go on to defeat Joe, winning the ICW World Heavyweight Championship for the first time since 2012, and the third time overall, becoming the first ever Undisputed ICW World Champion. After successfully defending the title against Bram & James Storm, Gunn's rivalry with Mikey Whiplash was re-ignited, with Whiplash claiming that Gunn had forgotten who he truly is, and demanding to face 'The Oddity' one more time. On 3 April 2018, Gunn was forced to vacate the ICW Zero-G Championship due to a double pinfall between Jody Fleisch and Mark Coffey, and interference from Whiplash. On 29 April 2018, at ICW BarraMania 4, 'The Oddity' returned to face Whiplash in the first ever ICW World Heavyweight Championship Death Match. Gunn would go on to lose the title, after 2018 Square Go winner Stevie Boy cashed in his contract mid-match, turning the contest into a Three Way, and pinned Whiplash, who had been driven through a pane of glass.

Having lost both titles without being pinned, Gunn looked to climb back up the ladder. After facing and defeating Walter at night 1 of Shug's Hoose Party 5, Gunn's protege Kez Evans attacked him, claiming that Gunn had done nothing except hold him back. Kez would go on to defeat Gunn the following night. After briefly reforming the New Age Kliq to challenge the Kings Of Catch, Renfrew left the company, changing Gunn's direction and focus. After accepting an offer from Wolfgang & The Purge to join Bad Company, Gunn & Wolfgang teamed with Noam Dar to face British Strong Style at Fear & Loathing XI, with Gunn scoring the pin over Trent Seven for the win.

Gunn & The Purge would then become embroiled in a feud with ICW owner Mark Dallas and his heel faction, with Dallas stating that Bad Company are not would the ICW needs in its current climate. After defeating Joe Hendry, Kez Evans & Leyton Buzzard in a 6-man tag team match, Gunn & The Purge were the first team announced for the inaugural 'King Of Hawners' tournament, which they went on to win.

Gunn had a long term feud with Kez Evans which spanned events like ICW I Ain't Yer Pal, Dickface!, ICW Shug's Hoose Party 5 and ICW Barred II. Having faced one another for the World and Zero-G Championships, they formed an alliance in 2023 to challenge for the Tag Team Championships.

=== What Culture Pro Wrestling/Defiant Wrestling (2017–2019) ===
In Defiant Wrestling, Gunn was part of a stable called The Prestige, alongside Joe Coffey, Joe Hendry, El Ligero & Travis Banks. Gunn joined at an event called Exit Wounds. At WCPW Loaded #20, Gunn made his WCPW debut as he defeated Travis Banks. On WCPW Pro Wrestling World Cup - English Qualifying Round, The Prestige defeated Bullet Club (Adam Cole, The Young Bucks) and Gabriel Kidd. At WCPW Pro Wrestling World Cup - Scottish Qualifying Round, Gunn defeated Lewis Girvan in the first round match of the Pro Wrestling World Cup Scottish Qualifying, Gunn was defeated in the final match of the first round match of the Pro Wrestling World Cup Scottish Qualifying by Drew Galloway.

At the last episode of WCPW Loaded the show was re-branded as Defiant Wrestling before the show started. Gunn and Joe Coffey would betray The Prestige by walking out on the team, leaving former stable mates Joe Hendry and El Ligero to be beaten up by Marty Scurll and The Young Bucks. At the first iPPV, #WeAreDefiant, they gained the #1 contendership for the Defiant Wrestling Tag Team Championship. At the 22 December episode of Defiant, they unsuccessful challenged for the titles, losing to defending champions Jimmy Havoc and the Primate.

=== Iron Girders Pro Wrestling (2022–present) ===
Gunn is a trainer at Wolfgang's Iron Girders Gym and wrestles for Iron Girders Pro Wrestling. For IGPW, has faced Eric Young, Kez Evans, Jason Reed and challenged for the ACME Comic Con Interpromotional Championship, as well as facing Andy Roberts for the Union of European Wrestling Alliances European Heavyweight Championship at an event cross-promoted with Fife Pro Wrestling Asylum.

=== Other Independents (2006-present) ===
On 18 February at Chain Reaction, Gunn joined Team Defiant (Rampage, Martin Kirby, Travis Banks and Primate) who defeated Team IPW (Austin Aries, No Funne Dunne, Mark Haskins, Kyle Fletcher and Mark Davis). For IGPW, he has faced Eric Young, Kez Evans, Jason Reed, challenged for the ACME Comic Con Interpromotional Championship and faced Andrew Inch for the Union of European Wrestling Alliances European Heavyweight Championship at a cross-promotion event with the Fife Pro Wrestling Asylum. Gunn later won the European Heavyweight Championship from Robert Star in March 2025.

== Championships and accomplishments ==
- British Championship Wrestling
  - BCW Heavyweight Championship (1 time)
  - BCW Openweight Championship (1 time)
  - BCW Tag Team Championship (1 time) – with Stevie Xavier
- CCW HeavyWeight Champion
- FULL TILT WRESTLING
  - FTW Tag Team Championship (1 time) – with Dickie Divers
- Insane Championship Wrestling
  - ICW First Undisputed Champion
  - ICW World Heavyweight Championship (3 times)
  - ICW Tag Team Championship (4 time, current) – with Chris Renfrew (3) and Kez Evans (1, current)
  - ICW Zero-G Championship (1 time)
  - King of Insanity (1 time)
  - ICW "Feud of the Year" Bammy Award with Mikey Whiplash (2015)
  - ICW "Most Insane Wrestler of the Year" Bammy Award (2015)
  - ICW "Match of the Year" Bammy Award – Legion (Mikey Whiplash, Tommy End and Michael Dante) vs New Age Kliq (BT Gunn, Chris Renfrew and Wolfgang) at Fear & Loathing VIII (2015)
  - King of Hawners Tournament (2019) – with Stevie James and Krobar
  - First Triple Crown Champion
- Main Event Wrestling
  - MEW North East Championship (1 time)
  - MEW Tag Team Championship (2 times) – with Chris Renfrew
- Premier British Wrestling
  - PBW Heavyweight Championship (2 times)
  - PBW Tag Team Championship (1 time) – with Stevie Xavier
- Pro Wrestling Elite
  - PWE Tag Team Championship (2 times) – with Chris Renfrew
- Union of European Wrestling Alliance
  - European Heavyweight Championship (1 time, current)
- Revolution Championship Wrestling
  - RCW Championship (1 time)
- Rock N Wrestle
  - RNW Tag Team Championship (1 time, inaugural) – with Stevie Xavier
  - King of the North (2015)
- Scottish Wrestling Alliance
  - NWA Scottish Heavyweight Championship (1 time)
- Southside Wrestling Entertainment
  - SWE Heavyweight Championship (1 time)
- Scotia Pro Wrestling/Saltire Championship Wrestling
  - SPW/SCW Heavyweight Championship (1 time, current)
- Target Wrestling
  - Target Wrestling Championship (1 time, inaugural)
  - Target Wrestling Tag Team Championship (1 time) – with Chris Renfrew
  - Target Wrestling Championship Tournament (2013)
- TNT Extreme Wrestling
  - TNT Extreme Division Championship (1 time)
- What Culture Pro Wrestling
  - WCPW Hardcore Championship (1 time)
- Pro Wrestling Scotland
  - PWS Heavyweight Championship (1 time, current)
