= ICW I Ain't Yer Pal, Dickface! =

2019 ICW event

- Promotion: Insane Championship Wrestling
- Date: June 16, 2019
- City: Glasgow Scotland
- Venue: The Garage

ICW shows chronology
← Previous; ICW King of Hawners	Next → ICW Shug's Hoose Party 6

ICW I Ain't Yer Pal, Dickface! was a professional wrestling event produced by Insane Championship Wrestling. It took place on June, 16 2019, at The Garage in Glasgow, Scotland. The event featured wrestlers like Kez Evans, BT Gunn, Andy Wild, Jonny Storm, Jack Tomlinson, Joe Hendry and a double championship match between ICW World Heavyweight Champion Lionheart and Union of European Wrestling Alliances European Heavyweight Champion Alexander Dean.

The event is best known for hosting the final professional wrestling match of Adrian "Lionheart" McAllum, who died by suicide three days later.

== Production ==
=== Background ===
ICW I Ain't Yer Pal, Dickface! was recorded as a taping for ICW's weekly Fight Club broadcast. It aired in three parts as ICW Fight Club episodes #128, #129 and #130 through June and July.

Grado was announced to face Ravie Davie at the event but was replaced by an unnamed opponent.

The event's name is a reference to a line from Donald Gibb in the 1988 movie Bloodsport starring Jean Claude Van Damme.

=== Storylines ===
Promoted in advance for the event was Jonny Storm's singles ICW debut as well as an early contest in the long running feud between Kez Evans and BT Gunn.

The story of the main event was the Winner Take All match between ICW World Heavyweight Champion Lionheart and Union of European Wrestling Alliances European Heavyweight Champion Alexander Dean.

In the first ICW vs. UEWA title match since Drew Galloway vs. Chaos and Apu Singh in 2015, Lionheart was victorious, now holding the ICW and UEWA titles, in addition to the Scottish Heavyweight Championship.

=== Event ===
The event saw Kieran Kelly defeat Jonny Storm and Kez Evans defeat his coach BT Gunn in upset victories. Joe Hendry defeated Andy Wild. Lionheart defeated Alexander Dean to retain the ICW World Heavyweight Championship and gain the Union of European Wrestling Alliances European Heavyweight Championship.

=== Aftermath ===
On June 19, 2019, it was announced that the reigning ICW World Heavyweight Champion, Scottish Heavyweight Champion and UEWA European Heavyweight Champion Lionheart had died by suicide.

McAllum's Pro Wrestling Elite promotion saw its final event promoted in his honour after his death. The vacated UEWA European Heavyweight Championship was contested at the event, with Andy Wild winning the title in a match with BT Gunn and McAllum's final opponent Alexander Dean. The following month Wild defended the title at British Championship Wrestling's Believe: A Night in Memory of Lionheart.

== Results ==
No.	Results	Stipulations
1	Liam Thomson defeated Kid Fite	Singles match
2	Kez Evans defeated BT Gunn	Singles match
3	Kieran Kelly defeated Jonny Storm	Singles match
4	Aivil defeated Kasey	Singles match
5	Paul Robinson defeated Lou King Sharp	Singles match
6	Ravie Davie defeated Unknown	Singles match
7	The Nine9 (Dickie Divers & Jack Morris) defeated The Kings Of Catch (Aspen Faith & Lewis Girvan)	Tag Team match
8	Joe Hendry defeated Andy Wild	Singles match
9	Lionheart (c) defeated Alexander Dean (c)	Winner-Take-All singles match for the ICW World Heavyweight Championship and UEWA European Heavyweight Championship
(c) / – the champion(s) heading into the match

== See also ==
- 2019 in professional wrestling
- Insane Championship Wrestling
- ICW Fear & Loathing IX
- Lionheart
