= PWE =

PWE can refer to:

- Pete Waterman Entertainment, a British record label
- Plane wave expansion method, an analytical procedure used in physics
- Political Warfare Executive, World War II British propaganda organization
- Protestant work ethic (sometimes referred to as Puritan work ethic), a social concept first referred to in the works of sociologist Max Weber
- Pevek Airport in Russia (IATA code)
- Penn West Energy Trust (New York Stock Exchange ticker symbol)
- Perfect World Entertainment, a video game publisher
- Pollokshaws East railway station in Glasgow, Scotland (National Rail station code)
- Pro Wrestling Elite, a professional wrestling promotion founded by Lionheart
- Pseudo-wire emulation, emulation of a point-to-point connection over a packet-switched network
- Yoshimi P-We, musician
