= Wild Boar (wrestler) =

Welsh professional wrestler

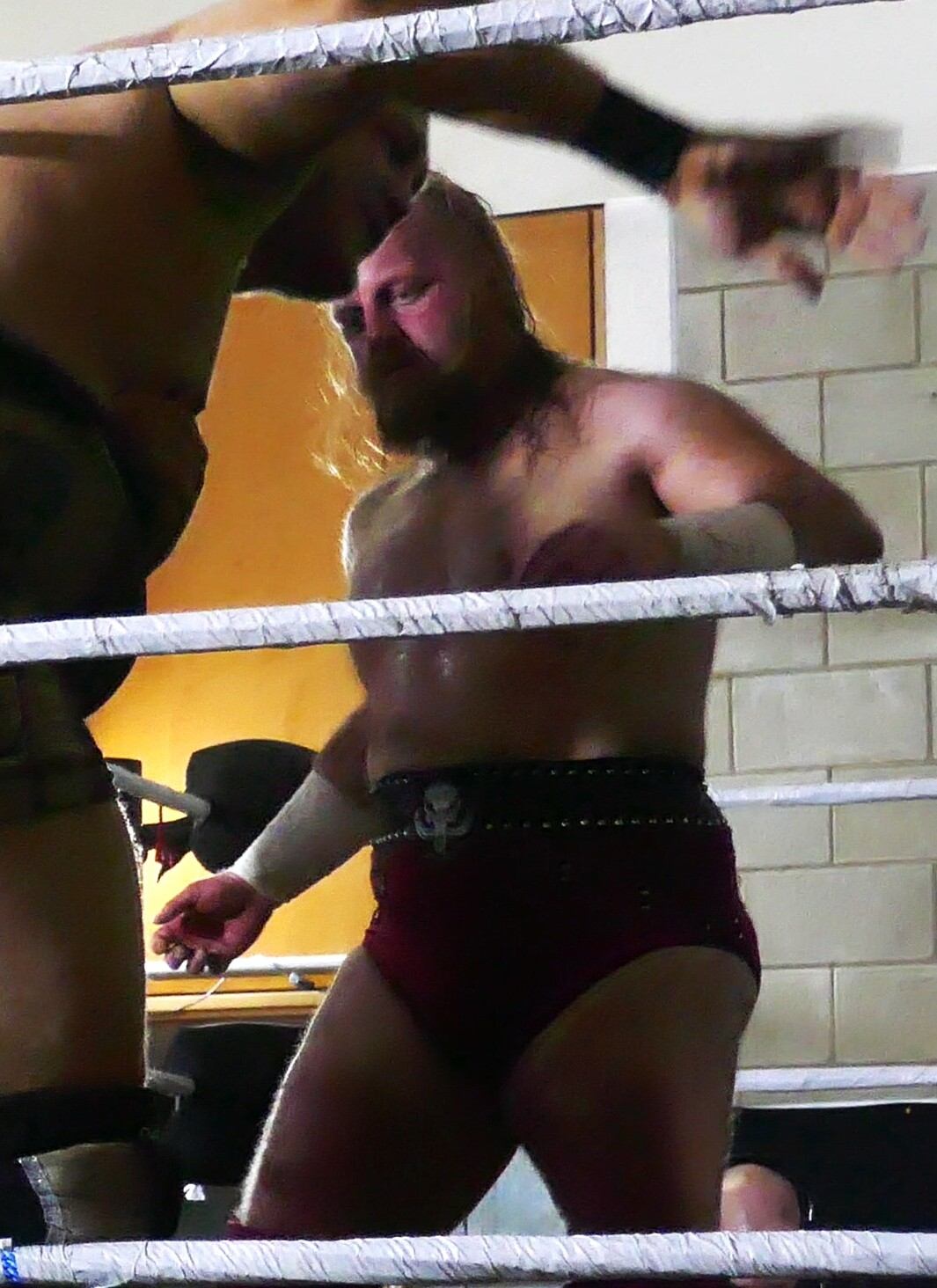
- Wild Boar in July 2025

Personal information
- Born: Michael Hitchman; 12 October 1989 (age 36)

Professional wrestling career
- Ring name(s): Mike Hitchman; Mike Kannon; Wild Boar
- Billed height: 5 ft 6 in (168 cm)
- Billed weight: 204 lb (93 kg)
- Billed from: Blaina, South Wales, Wales, UK
- Trained by: Mike Bird; Jason Cross
- Debut: 2006
- Retired: October 9, 2025

Michael Hitchman (12 October 1989) better known by his ring name Wild Boar is a Welsh retired professional wrestler. He is most well known for his work in WWE on the NXT UK brand. He has also known for his time in extensively on the European independent wrestling circuit for companies such as the Insane Championship Wrestling (ICW), Revolution Pro Wrestling (Revpro), Progress Wrestling, Union of European Wrestling Alliances (UEWA), ATTACK! Pro Wrestling, International Pro Wrestling: United Kingdom (IPW: UK), Frontier Wrestling Alliance (FWA), British Championship Wrestling (BCW), Dragon Gate UK and Welsh Wrestling.

Wild Boar co-owns the Pro Wrestling Chaos promotion with Flash Morgan Webster.

== Professional wrestling career ==
=== Independent circuit (2006–2021, 2022–present) ===
Hitchman debuted as Mike Kannon for NWA Wales in 2006 before adopting the Wild Boar name in 2009. In 2011, Wild Boar defeated Mark Andrews and Flash Morgan Webster in Welsh Wrestling to qualify for the Union of European Wrestling Alliances European Cruiserweight Championship tournament but was eliminated by Sean South.

Wild Boar participated in Pro Wrestling Zero1's European Challenge 2: The Battle of Scotland in a losing effort to Liam Thomson on 24 November 2012.

In 2013, he won his first title in Attack! Pro Wrestling when gained the Attack! 24:7 Championship. He held the title a further five times and also became a two-time Attack! Champion.

On 5 February 2017, Wild Boar and Mike Bird, as The Marauders, defeated Polo Promotions (Jackie Polo and Mark Coffey) to become the ICW Tag Team Champions. The Marauders held the titles for 287 days and defended against The Kinky Party (Jack Jester and Sha Samuels), POD (Ashton Smith and Rampage Brown) and Moustache Mountain (Tyler Bate and Trent Seven) before losing the titles back to Polo Promotions at ICW: Fear & Loathing X at the SSE Hydro.

At a cross-promotional event between Fife Pro Wrestling Asylum and New Wave Wrestling Academy, Wild Boar unsuccessfully challenged Andy Roberts for European Heavyweight Championship on 2 March 2023.

On 26 August 2023, Wild Boar challenged Connor Mills for RevPro Undisputed British Cruiserweight Championship at RevPro: 11 Year Anniversary Show.

=== WWE (2018–2022) ===
Wild Boar was signed by WWE in 2018, initially in dark matches before appearing on NXT UK as Mike Hitchman. Initially he was largely on the losing end of matches against Mark Andrews, Ligero, Dave Mastiff, Jordan Devlin and others.

He began teaming with Primate as The Hunt under the Wild Boar name, trading wins and losses with Moustache Mountain (Trent Seven & Tyler Bate), Pretty Deadly (Lewis Howley & Sam Stoker), Grizzled Young Veterans (James Drake & Zack Gibson) and Imperium (Fabian Aichner & Marcel Barthel), among others.

Wild Boar challenged the NXT UK Tag Team Championship on a few occasions with both Primate and Mark Andrews but was ultimately defeated by the likes of Gallus (Mark Coffey and Wolfgang), Pretty Deadly and Brooks Jensen and Josh Briggs.

A notable singles match from this period was a victory over his former ally Eddie Dennis in a Dog Collar Match in April 2022, which was one of only three Dog Collar matches in WWE history. Wild Boar's final WWE appearance occurred on 6 June 2022, when he defeated Josh Morrell in a dark match.

On 18 August 2022, Boar was released from his WWE contract.

== Championships and accomplishments ==
- Attack! Pro Wrestling
  - Attack! Championship (2 time)
  - Attack! 24:7 Championship (5 times)
  - Elder Stein Invitational (2015)
  - Attack! Title Tournament (2023)
- Insane Championship Wrestling
  - ICW Tag Team Championship (1 time) - with Mike Bird
- Dragon Pro Wrestling
  - All Wales Championship (1 time, inaugural)
- Kombat Pro Wrestling
  - KPW Tag Team Championship (1 time) - with Primate
- Pro Evolution Wrestling
  - Pro Evolution Tag Team Championship (1 time) - with Mike Bird
- Pro Wrestling 4 U
  - PW4U World Championship (1 time)
- Pro Wrestling Chaos
  - King of Chaos Championship (2 times)
- Scottish Wrestling Alliance
  - Scottish Junior Heavyweight Championship (1 time, inaugural)
  - Scottish Junior Heavyweight Title Tournament (2013)
- Pro Wrestling Illustrated
  - Ranked No. 432 of the top 500 singles wrestlers in the PWI 500 in 2019
