= Kez Evans =

Scottish professional wrestler

Personal information
- Born: Kieran Evans; March 19, 1995 (age 31)

Professional wrestling career
- Ring name: Kez Evans
- Billed weight: 222 lb (101 kg)
- Billed from: Glasgow, Scotland
- Trained by: BT Gunn; Lionheart; Stevie Boy; Jack Jester; Wolfgang
- Debut: 2016

Kieran Evans better known by his ring name Kez Evans is a Scottish professional wrestler. He is most well known for his work in Insane Championship Wrestling where he is a former ICW World Heavyweight Champion, ICW Zero-G Champion and winner of the 2020 Square Go! match.

Evans is also a pro wrestling trainer, coaching at Wolfgang's Iron Girders Wrestling Gym.

== Professional wrestling career ==
Kez Evans trained at the Glasgow Pro Wrestling Asylum and spent his early career wrestling on GPWA events, as well as for his trainer Lionheart's Pro Wrestling Elite promotion.

Evans became a regular for Insane Championship Wrestling. His notable early victories included wins over BT Gunn at ICW: I Ain't Yer Pal, Dickface! and ICW: Shug's Hoose Party 5 , Kay Lee Ray on ICW Fight Club and Ilja Dragunov at ICW Fear & Loathing XII.

On 2 February 2020, Evans won the Square Go! rumble match to earn a future title shot. After feuding with Craig Anthony, Evans successfully cashed in his Square Go! contract against Anthony to become the ICW Zero-G Champion. Evans held the title for 141 days, successfully defending against Adam Maxted before losing it to Daz Black.

In August 2021, Evans made his debut in the Pro Wrestling Illustrated PWI 500 with a No. 299 ranking.

On 21 November 2021, Evans defeated JAXN for the ICW World Heavyweight Championship at ICW: Fear & Loathing XIII. Holding the title for 364 days, Evans defended against Grado, Jack Jester, Wolfgang and Mark Haskins in matches aired on the WWE Network before losing to Leyton Buzzard at ICW: Fear & Loathing XIV.

Outside of ICW, Evans has also competed for British Championship Wrestling where he defeated Andy Wild at BCW: Back To Business as well Fife Pro Wrestling Asylum with whom Iron Girders Pro Wrestling had two collaborative events. For these events, Evans defeated Jason Reed, fought Andy Roberts to a no-contest in a match for the Union of European Wrestling Alliances European Heavyweight Championship and teamed with Gunn in a victory over Roberts and Reed.

On 5 February 2023, Evans challenged Josh Alexander for the Impact Wrestling World Championship in a losing effort.

Evans placed in the PWI 500 for the third time on 14 September 2023, ranking at 206.

== Championships and accomplishments ==
- Insane Championship Wrestling
  - ICW World Heavyweight Championship (1 time)
  - ICW Tag Team Championship (1 time, current) – with BT Gunn
  - ICW Zero G-Championship (1 time)
  - Square Go! (2020)
  - 3rd Triple Crown Champion
- Pro Wrestling Illustrated
  - Ranked No. 198 of the top 500 singles wrestlers in the PWI 500 in 2022
- Scottish Wrestling Network
  - SWN Award (1 time)
    - Feud of the Year (2021) - vs. Craig Anthony
  - Ranked No.7 in the SWN100 in 2022
