= ICW Zero-G Championship =

Professional wrestling championship

Details
- Promotion: Insane Championship Wrestling
- Date established: 21 November 2011
- Current champion: Myles Kayman
- Date won: 20 June 2026
Statistics
- First champion: Noam Dar
- Most reigns: Kenny Williams (4 reigns)
- Longest reign: Liam Thomson (427 days)
- Shortest reign: Craig Anthony (<1 day)
- Youngest champion: Noam Dar (17 years)

The ICW Zero-G Championship is a professional wrestling junior heavyweight championship owned by United Kingdom's Insane Championship Wrestling promotion. The title was first established as the Zero Gravity Championship at Fear & Loathing III on 21 November 2011, with Noam Dar becoming the inaugural champion.

== Title history ==
As of 2 July 2026, there have been 37 reigns between 26 champions and two vacancy. Noam Dar was the inaugural champion, defeating Andy Wild, Falcon and Rob Cage in a tournament final at Fear and Loathing 3. Kenny Williams has the most reigns with four. Liam Thomson's second reign is the longest at 426 days, while Craig Anthony has the shortest at less than a day.

The title has been a stepping stone for some champions to move towards the ICW World Heavyweight Championship, including Wolfgang, Lionheart, Stevie Boy, and BT Gunn.

Myles Kayman is the current champion in his first reign. He defeated Wolfgang, Daz Black and Henry Faust at Insane NORTH Weekender - Night 1 on 20 June 2026 in Newcastle, England. This was a joint show between ICW and NORTH Wrestling.

=== Reigns ===
Key
No.	Overall reign number
Reign	Reign number for the specific champion
Days	Number of days held
<1	Reign lasted less than a day
+	Current reign is changing daily

No.	Champion	Championship change			Reign statistics		Notes	Ref.
No.	Champion	Date	Event	Location	Reign	Days	Notes	Ref.
1	Noam Dar	21 November 2010	Fear & Loathing III	Glasgow, Scotland	1	266	Noam Dar defeated Andy Wild, Falcon and Rob Cage in a Four Way Elimination match in a tournament final to become Inaugural champion.	
2	Lionheart	14 August 2011	SummerBam	Glasgow, Scotland	1	70		
3	Noam Dar	23 October 2011	Fear & Loathing IV	Glasgow, Scotland	2	252		
4	Andy Wild	1 July 2012	Insane In The Membrane	Glasgow, Scotland	1	231	This was a Three Way match which also involves Christopher.	
5	Wolfgang	17 February 2013	Tramspotting	Edinburgh, Scotland	1	189		
6	Mikey Whiplash	25 August 2013	Dave's Not Here Man!	Edinburgh, Scotland	1	13	This was a Winner Takes All match in which Whiplash defended ICW Heavyweight Championship.	
7	Mark Coffey	7 September 2013	There's Something About Mary(hill)	Glasgow, Scotland	1	204		
8	Fergal Devitt	30 March 2014	Still Smoking	Glasgow, Scotland	1	28		
9	Mark Coffey	27 April 2014	Show Me Your Lizard	Glasgow, Scotland	2	147	This was a Three Way match which also involves Noam Dar.	
10	Kenny Williams	21 September 2014	Spacebaws Episode IV: A New Hope	Glasgow, Scotland	1	203		
11	Danny Hope	12 April 2015	Insane Entertainment System Tour - Boom Shakalaka (He's On Fire)	Liverpool, England	1	7		
12	Stevie Boy	19 April 2015	Insane Entertainment System Tour - Alex Kidd In London	London, England	1	210	This was a Six Way match which involves Kenny Williams, Kid Fite, Liam Thomson and Paul Robinson.	
13	Davey Boy	15 November 2015	Fear & Loathing VIII	Glasgow, Scotland	1	140		
14	Lionheart	3 April 2016	BarraMania II	Glasgow, Scotland	2	231	This was a Six Way match which involves Joe Hendry, Kenny Williams, Liam Thomson and Zack Gibson.	
15	Kenny Williams	20 November 2016	Fear & Loathing IX	Glasgow, Scotland	2	210	This was a Stairway To Heaven match which also involved Zack Gibson, Aaron Echo, Andy Wild, Liam Thomson and Iestyn Rees.	
16	Zack Gibson	18 June 2017	Fight Club	Glasgow, Scotland	1	41	This was a Falls Count Anywhere Street Fight match.	
17	Kenny Williams	29 July 2017	Shug's Hoose Party 4 - Day 1	Glasgow, Scotland	3	1	This was a Ladder match.	
18	BT Gunn	30 July 2017	Shug's Hoose Party 4 - Day 2	Glasgow, Scotland	1	245		
—	Vacated	1 April 2018	—	—	—	—	Vacated after a double pinfall between Jody Fleisch and Mark Coffey in a Three Way match.	
19	Mark Coffey	29 April 2018	BarraMania 4	Glasgow, Scotland	3	217	This was a Gauntlet match for a vacant title which also involves Aaron Echo, Andy Wild, DCT, Jordan Devlin and Rampage Brown.	
20	Joe Coffey	2 December 2018	Fear & Loathing XI	Glasgow, Scotland	1	237		
21	Liam Thomson	27 July 2019	Shug's Hoose Party 6 - Day 1	Glasgow, Scotland	1	141	This was a Save Pro Wrestling Rules match.	
22	Leyton Buzzard	15 December 2019	Fight Club	Glasgow, Scotland	1	49		
23	Liam Thomson	2 February 2020	9th Annual Square Go!	Glasgow, Scotland	2	426		
—	Vacated	3 April 2021	—	—	—	—	Thomson had to vacate the championship due to injury.	
24	Craig Anthony	10 April 2021	Fight Club	Glasgow, Scotland	1	<1		
25	Kez Evans	10 April 2021	Fight Club	Glasgow, Scotland	1	141		
26	Daz Black	29 August 2021	Fight Club	Glasgow, Scotland	1	175		
27	Dylan Thorn	20 February 2022	10th Annual Square Go!	Glasgow, Scotland	1	160		
28	Daz Black	July 30, 2022	Shug's Hoose Party 7 - Night 2	Glasgow, Scotland	2	113	This was a Ladder match.	
29	Theo Doros	November 20, 2022	Fear & Loathing XIV	Glasgow, Scotland	1	98	The event will air at a later date on the WWE Network.	
30	Saqib Ali	February 26, 2023	The 11th Annual Square Go!	Glasgow, Scotland	1	77		
31	Jason Reed	May 14, 2023	Get The F Out	Glasgow, Scotland	1	91	This was a four way match also involving Che Monet and Stevie James.	
32	Stevie James	August 13, 2023	Shug's Hoose Party 8	Glasgow, Scotland	1	<1		
33	Kenny Williams	August 13, 2023	Shug's Hoose Party 8	Glasgow, Scotland	4	119		
34	Stevie James	10 December 2023	Fear and Loathing XV	Glasgow, Scotland	2	188	This was a Two out of Three Falls Match versus Kenny Williams.	
35	Theo Doros	15 June 2024	After Hours: Night One	Glasgow, Scotland	2	155	Interrupted Landon Riley's Number One Contendership Match for the Zero-G Championship. Doros demanded a championship opportunity which James accepted. Defeated Stevie James via pinfall.	
36	Landon Riley	17 November 2024	Fear and Loathing XVI	Glasgow, Scotland	1	105	Pinned Theo Doros to win the Three-Way Dance versus Doros and Stevie James.	
37	Lewis Girvan	2 March 2025	ICW Bad Habits	Glasgow, Scotland	1	77	Pinned Landon Riley to win the triple threat match versus Landon Riley and Ryan Richards.	
38	Sha Samuels	18 May 2025	ICW We Run This Town	Glasgow, Scotland	1	105	This was a Six Man Sauchiehall Scramble Match also involving Craig Anthony, Jack Morris, Jack Ripley and Landon Riley.	
39	Jack Morris	31 August 2025	ICW I Assure You, We're Open	Glasgow, Scotland	1	63	This was a three-way also involving Craig Anthony.	
40	Wolfgang	2 November 2025	ICW We're No Fae Here	Edinburgh, Scotland	2	230	This was a three-way also involving Daz Black.	
41	Myles Kayman	20 June 2026	Insane NORTH Weekender - Night 1	Newcastle, England	1	144+	This was a four-way match also involving Daz Black and Henry Faust.	

== Combined reigns ==
As of 2 July 2026

†	Indicates the current champion

Rank	Champion	No. of reigns	Combined days
1	Mark Coffey	3	568
2	Liam Thomson	2	567
3	Kenny Williams	4	533
4	Noam Dar	2	518
5	Wolfgang	2	419
6	Lionheart	2	301
7	Daz Black	2	288
8	Theo Doros	2	253
9	BT Gunn	1	247
10	Joe Coffey	1	237
11	Andrew Wilde	1	231
12	Stevie Boy	1	210
13	Stevie James	2	188
14	Dylan Thorn	1	160
15	Myles Kayman †	1	144+
16	Kez Evans	1	141
17	Davey Boy	1	140
18	Landon Riley	1	105
18	Sha Samuels	1	105
20	Jason Reed	1	91
21	Saqib Ali	1	77
21	Lewis Girvan	1	77
23	Jack Morris	1	63
24	Leyton Buzzard	1	49
25	Zack Gibson	1	41
26	Fergal Devitt	1	28
27	Mikey Whiplash	1	13
28	Danny Hope	1	7
29	Craig Anthony	1	<1

== See also ==
- Insane Championship Wrestling
- ICW World Heavyweight Championship
- ICW Tag Team Championship
- ICW Women's Championship
