= Kenny Williams (wrestler) =

Scottish professional wrestler

Personal information
- Born: Alan Niddrie; June 13, 1993 (age 33) Airdrie

Professional wrestling career
- Ring name(s): Kenneth; Kenny Williams
- Billed height: 5 ft 9 in (175 cm)
- Billed weight: 180 lb (82 kg)
- Billed from: Thunder Road, Hill Valley
- Trained by: Kid Fite; TJ Rage
- Debut: 25 January 2012

Alan Niddrie (born 13 June 1993) better known by his ring name Kenny Williams, is a Scottish professional wrestler, currently competing on the Scottish independent circuit. He is most well known for his time in WWE where he competed on the NXT UK brand.

Williams is also active in multiple promotions across the United Kingdom and Europe, such as Progress Wrestling, Premier British Wrestling, Preston City Wrestling, Pro Wrestling Elite, British Championship Wrestling, IPW:UK, Scottish Wrestling Alliance, and competed in Defiant Wrestling in the Pro Wrestling World Cup, representing Scotland, but is best known for his work in Insane Championship Wrestling, where he is a four-time ICW Zero-G Champion and he is a Winner Square Go! (2024) he is the former longest reign one-time ICW World Heavyweight Champion.

== Professional wrestling career ==
=== Independent circuit (2012–present) ===
Williams made his professional wrestling debut on 25 January 2012. On 25 May 2013, in a tag team match for the tag team titles. The match was Williams and Chris Rampage vs. champions Jack Jester and Mikey Whiplash. Williams and Rampage lost the match, which meant Jester and Whiplash were able to retained the tag team championship. On 4 April 2015, Kenny Williams was in a Four Way Match for the Open weight Championship. The match was Kenny Williams vs. Davey Blaze, Liam Thompson and Noam Dar. Kenny Williams won the match to become the BCW Open Weight Champion. On 5 May 2015, Kenny Williams made his debut in a tag team match. The match was Team CK vs Fight Club (Kid Fite and Liam Thompson); Team CK won the match. On 14 November 2015, Kenny Williams was in a match for the tag team championship. He teamed with Grado against Darkside and TJ Rage. Williams and Grado won to become the new tag team champions. On 13 September 2014, Williams debuted in a Triple Treat Match, also featuring El Ligero and Joey Hayes. Ligero won the match. On 21 July, Kenny Williams was in a singles match against Joe Hendry. Williams won this match to become Pro Wrestling Elite Heavyweight Champion.

Williams began working on the UK independent wrestling circuit again in October 2022. On 12 October, he returned to BCW to challenge Andy Roberts for the Union of European Wrestling Alliances European Heavyweight Championship but was defeated.

For Insane Championship Wrestling, he challenged Leyton Buzzard for the ICW World Heavyweight Championship at ICW: The Eleventh Annual Square Go! and defeated Stevie James to win his fourth ICW Zero-G Championship.

=== WWE (2018–2022) ===
On the 15 May 2018 edition of 205 Live, Williams was in a match against TJP, Kalisto and Tyler Bate, the match was won by Bate. On 16 May 2018, it was announced that he would be a part of the upcoming United Kingdom Championship Tournament. He lost to Dave Mastiff in the first round of the tournament.

On 25 August 2018, Williams started teaming up with Amir Jordan. On 14 October episode of NXT UK, they won their match against Dan Moloney and Tucker in a dark match. On 9 January 2019 episode of NXT UK, they won their second match against Dan Moloney and Jamie Ahmad. On 12 November 2020, they made their return against Wild Boar and Primate in a losing effort. On 4 March 2021, the duo defeated Ashton Smith and Oliver Carter. On 11 March, they defeated Flash Morgan Webster and Mark Andrews. However, the team of Williams and Jordan came to an end on 1 April 2021 edition of NXT UK when Williams cost the team their tag title opportunity by striking Jordan across the back with the NXT UK tag team championship belt, turning heel in the process.

On 18 August 2022, Williams was released from his WWE contract.

== Championships and accomplishments ==
- British Championship Wrestling
  - BCW Openweight Championship (1 time)
- Insane Championship Wrestling
  - ICW World Heavyweight Championship (1 time)
  - ICW Zero-G Championship (4 time)
  - Square Go! (2024)
- Premier British Wrestling
  - PBW Tag Team Championship (1 time) – with Grado
  - King of Cruisers (2014, 2015)
- Pro Wrestling Elite
  - PWE Heavyweight Championship (1 time)
  - Elite Rumble (2018)
- Pro Wrestling Illustrated
  - Ranked No. 168 of the top 500 singles wrestlers in the PWI 500 in 2025
