= Leyton Buzzard =

English professional wrestler (born 1997)

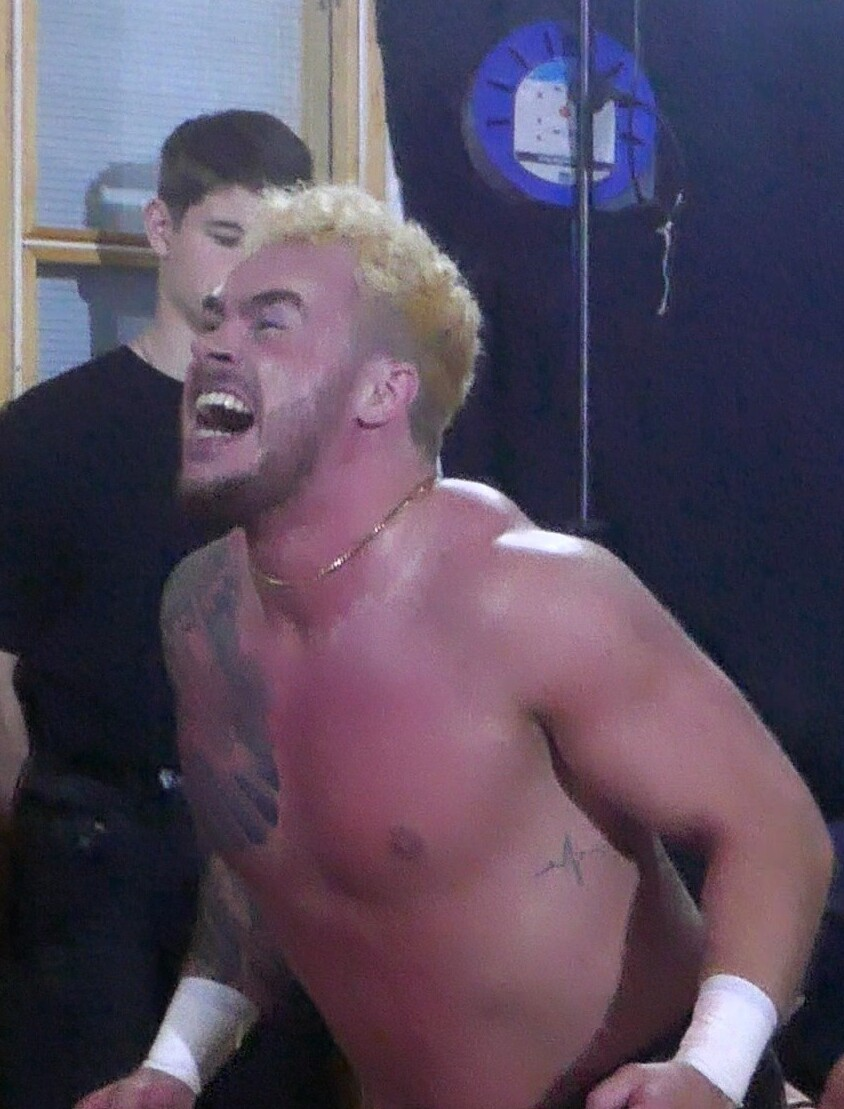
- Buzzard in November 2025

Personal information
- Born: Arthur Byrne; 14 September 1997 (age 29) Bristol, England

Professional wrestling career
- Ring name(s): Leyton Buzzard; Stevie Buzzard
- Trained by: Glasgow Pro Wrestling Asylum
- Debut: 2016

Arthur Byrne (born 14 September 1997), better known by his ring name Leyton Buzzard, is an English professional wrestler. He performs on the British independent circuit – predominantly for Revolution Pro Wrestling (RevPro), where he is a former one-time Undisputed British Cruiserweight Champion.

He was previously a child actor on stage and screen, and was one of the twelve potential Olivers on the BBC talent show I'd Do Anything, making the final eight.

== Acting career ==
Byrne first became involved in acting at the age of eight, and was encouraged by his parents who had seen their son sing along to Disney classics. A year later, his first role was when a production of Chitty Chitty Bang Bang came to Bristol, and he played the role of Jeremy Potts. Following this, he would be continuously working stage shows until 2008, when he appeared on the BBC talent show I'd Do Anything as a potential Oliver. On the show, he had a lead vocal on week three, singing "Teamwork", a song from Chitty Chitty Bang Bang. He made the final eight, and was eliminated in week nine, alongside four other boys. Byrne did in fact end up playing Oliver after his time on the show, at the Playhouse Theatre in July 2008. He later attended acting classes at the Sylvia Young Theatre School.

Byrne also had minor roles on film and television before his professional wrestling career, including playing the younger version of Martin McCreadie's character on The Five.

== Professional wrestling career ==
At the age of eighteen, Byrne travelled up to Glasgow to train at the Glasgow Pro Wrestling Asylum. He made his in-ring debut as Wee Arthur at GPWA's Proving Ground event on 16 October 2016.

=== Independent Circuit (2017–present) ===
Leyton Buzzard has been active on the UK and international independent circuits. He has worked in multiple countries companies like Revolution Pro Wrestling, Over the Top Wrestling, British Championship Wrestling, Pro Wrestling Elite, Westside Xtreme Wrestling, Fife Pro Wrestling Asylum, Black Label Pro, C*4 Wrestling, Iron Girders Pro Wrestling, WrestleFest DXB, Pro Wrestling Chaos, Israeli Pro Wrestling Association And many more.

In 2019, he won the SWA X Championship and the PBW King of Cruisers then the PCW Cruiserweight Championship in 2020. In 2023, he held the FPPW Irish Junior Heavyweight Championship.

=== Insane Championship Wrestling (2017–2023) ===
In 2017, Leyton Buzzard began competing in squash matches for Insane Championship Wrestling (ICW) before making his debut-proper as the assistant ("Prestigious Intern") to Joe Hendry. He was unwaveringly loyal to Hendry, who later added Kez Evans and Ravie Davie to his stable, the Dallas Mavericks. Eventually, Hendry got annoyed with Buzzard losing all the time, and began denigrating him more and more until Buzzard turned face. The feud between the two men culminated at Shug's Hoose 6, with the stipulation being a career versus freedom of speech match (if Buzzard won, Hendry would leave ICW, and if Hendry won, Buzzard would be forced to wear a mask and be silent until Fear & Loathing XII). On night one of the event, Buzzard defeated Hendry, by hitting a uranage and a 450 splash on him to win the match. On night two, Buzzard was announced as James Storm's opponent, after Storm attacked Grado before the bell rang. Towards the end, Grado interfered by performing a rolling cannonball to Storm in the corner, allowing Buzzard to hit a 450 splash, and win the match.

Following this, Buzzard would be in the involved in the title chase for the Zero-G Championship, ICW's junior heavyweight championship. On 12 October 2019, at Gonzo, Buzzard was defeated by reigning champion Liam Thomson in the main event. On 15 December, at Fight Club, Buzzard became the number one contender, by defeating longtime rival Kieran Kelly. Although the match would be set for Square Go! on 2 February 2020, Thomson, who was already booked for an open challenge title match, decided to defend the title against Buzzard the same night. Buzzard defeated Thomson to win his first title in ICW. On 19 January 2020, at Fight Club, Buzzard defeated TK Cooper in his first defence of the title. On 1 February, at Gonzo 3, Buzzard defeated Kenny Williams. The next day, at Square Go!, Buzzard dropped the title back to Thomson, ending his reign at 49 days. At ICW Fear and Loathing 2022, Buzzard won the ICW World Heavyweight Championship defeating Craig Anthony, Stevie James and champion Kez Evans in a Four-Way Elimination match.

As ICW World Heavyweight Champion, Buzzard declared he would be a "travelling World Champion" in the same way that Drew Galloway had for ICW in 2015. During his six month reign he defended the championship in Scotland, Italy, Spain, Sweden, Ireland, Canada and England. In ICW, he would defend the title against LJ Cleary, Big Damo and reigning Union of European Alliances European Heavyweight Champion Andy Roberts before losing to Aaron Echo in a Square Go! cash-in at ICW's Get the F Out! event. Buzzard then announced a hiatus from ICW.

=== Big Japan Pro-Wrestling (2023-2025) ===
Buzzard debuted for Big Japan Pro-Wrestling in August 2023.

== Filmography ==
=== Film ===
Year	Title	Role	Notes
2013	Tits	Doyle	Short film
2014	The Adventurer: The Curse of the Midas Box	Street Boy	

=== Television ===
Year	Title	Role	Notes
2008	I'd Do Anything	Himself	13 episodes
2009	Grandpa in My Pocket	Josh	Episode: "Trouble for Bubbles"
2016	The Five	Young Karl	2 episodes; uncredited for "Episode 1"

=== Video games ===
Year(s)	Title	Role	Notes
2014	Castlevania: Lords of Shadow 2	—	Motion capture

== Championships and accomplishments ==
- Big Japan Pro Wrestling
  - Yokohama Shopping Street 6-Man Tag Team Championship (1 time) – with Tempesta and Tyson Maddux
  - Ikkitousen Strong Climb (2025)
- Fight Factory Pro Wrestling
  - Irish Junior Heavyweight Championship (1 time)
- Hardcore Wrestling From Glasgow
  - HWFG Championship (1 time, inaugural, current)
  - HWFG Title Tournament (2025)
- Insane Championship Wrestling
  - ICW World Heavyweight Championship (1 time)
  - ICW Zero-G Championship (1 time)
  - 24/7 Hydro Contract (1 time)
  - Square Go!(2022)
- Premier British Wrestling
  - King of Cruisers (2019)
- Preston City Wrestling / Pro Championship Wrestling
  - PCW Cruiserweight Championship (1 time)
- Pro Wrestling Chaos
  - PWC Internet Championship (1 time)
- Pro Wrestling Illustrated
  - Ranked No. 243 of the top 500 singles wrestlers in the PWI 500 in 2023
- Revolution Pro Wrestling
  - Undisputed British Cruiserweight Championship (1 time)
- Riot Cabaret Pro Wrestling
  - Riot Cabaret Slam Ball Championship (1 time) – with Brendan White, Charlie Sterling and JJ Gale
- Community Pro Wrestling
  - CPW Cruiserweight Championship (1 time, current)
- Scottish Wrestling Alliance
  - Scottish X Championship (1 time)
- Scottish Wrestling Network
  - SWN Award for One to Watch [Male] (2020)
  - Ranked No.18 in the SWN100 in 2022
