= Johnny Kincaid =

Personal information
- Born: John Kincaid; 4 June 1945 (age 81) Battersea, England

Professional wrestling career
- Ring name: Johnny Kincaid
- Billed height: 6 ft 3 in (1.91 m)
- Billed weight: 246 lb (112 kg)
- Billed from: Barbados
- Debut: 16 July 1963
- Retired: 1986

John "Johnny" Kincaid (born 4 June 1945) is an English former professional wrestler and author. He was known for wrestling during the golden age of British wrestling as he was a regular on ITV's World of Sport. Kincaid is a former European heavyweight champion.

== Career ==
=== Wrestling ===
Kincaid started amateur boxing at the early age of 11, in his late teens he had many bouts under the IBA banner.

In July 1963 Kincaid started his career in professional wrestling. Johnny learnt his trade as a wrestler whilst he was boxing in a fair ground boxing booth. Kincaid enjoyed a career that lasted for over twenty years, he travelled the world applying his trade, he wrestled all over Europe, the Middle East, Africa, North America and in Asia including working for New Japan Pro-Wrestling in the 1970s. Kincaid won the European championship in 1980 when he defeated Rene Lasartesse in Hamburg, Germany.

=== Writing ===
Memoirs

- (2007) Johnny Kincaid: Wrestling's Ring Side Seat. AuthorHouse.
- (2009) From International Wrestler to Pubs and Punters. AuthorHouse.

== Championships and accomplishments ==
- Joint Promotions

- European Heavyweight Championship (once)
