= Henri Deglane =

French wrestler (1902–1975)

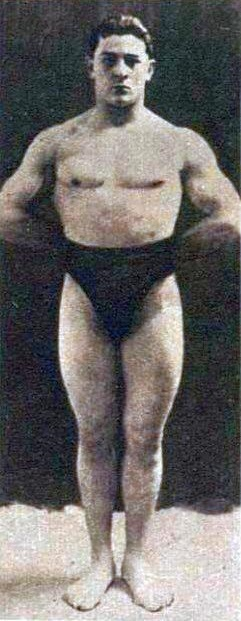
- Deglane in 1924

Personal information
- Born: 22 June 1902 Limoges, France
- Died: 7 July 1975 (aged 73) Chamalières, France
Medal record
Men's Greco-Roman wrestling
Representing France
Olympic Games
Gold medal – first place	1924 Paris	Heavyweight

Henri Deglane (22 June 1902 – 7 July 1975) was a French wrestler. He was an Olympic champion in Greco-Roman wrestling, and AWA World Champion in professional wrestling.

== Olympics ==
Deglane competed at the 1924 Summer Olympics in Paris and won a gold medal in Greco-Roman wrestling, the heavyweight class.

== Professional wrestling ==
In May 1931, Deglane faced Ed "Strangler" Lewis for the AWA World Heavyweight Championship in Montreal in a two-out-of-three falls match. After two falls, Deglane had feigned being bitten by Lewis, when in reality he had been bitten in the locker room. This led to Deglane being awarded the title via disqualification and a dispute over who was actually acknowledged as champion over the next two years.

In 1933, Raoul Paoli, a French rugby player and all-round athlete, helped Deglane, his friend, to popularize professional wrestling in France. In 1933 the two men co-founded the FFCP.

In July 1937 in Paris, France, Deglane lost his European Heavyweight Championship title to American Al Pereira.

He was inducted into the Wrestling Observer Hall of Fame in 2013 for his accomplishments in professional wrestling.

== Championships and accomplishments ==
- American Wrestling Association (Boston)
  - AWA World Heavyweight Championship (1 time)
- Wrestling Observer Newsletter
  - Wrestling Observer Newsletter Hall of Fame (Class of 2013)
