= ICW Tag Team Championship =

Professional wrestling tag team championship

Details
- Promotion: Insane Championship Wrestling
- Date established: 2 September 2012
- Current champions: The Dangerous Brothers (BT Gunn and Kez Evans)
- Date won: 29 March 2026
Statistics
- First champions: The S.T.I. (Dickie Divers and William Grange
- Most reigns: Polo Promotions (Jackie Polo and Mark Coffey) (4 reigns)
- Longest reign: Polo Promotions (Jackie Polo and Mark Coffey) (413 days)
- Shortest reign: Irn Jew, The New Age Kliq (14 days)

The ICW Tag Team Championship is a professional wrestling tag team championship owned by Scotland's Insane Championship Wrestling promotion. Complimenting ICW's two established singles titles (ICW World Heavyweight Championship and ICW Zero-G Championship), the Tag Team Championship was first established on September 2, 2012 when The S.T.I (Dickie Divers and William Grange) won a tournament final to become the inaugural champions.

The titles were defended outside of the United Kingdom for the first time on 29 February 2016 at a show in Dublin, Ireland. The ICW Tag Team Championships have also been defended in several other promotions, including Fife Pro Wrestling Asylum, Pro Wrestling Chaos, Premier British Wrestling and Copenhagen Championship Wrestling.

== Title history ==
Key
No.	Overall reign number
Reign	Reign number for the specific team—reign numbers for the individuals are in parentheses, if different
Days	Number of days held
+	Current reign is changing daily

No.	Champion	Championship change			Reign statistics		Notes	Ref.
No.	Champion	Date	Event	Location	Reign	Days	Notes	Ref.
1	The S.T.I. (Dickie Divers and William Grange)	2 September 2012	ICW Hadouken	Glasgow, Scotland	1	182	This was a Tables, Ladders and Chairs tournament final match also featuring The Bucky Boys (Davey Boy and Stevie Boy).	
2	The Bucky Boys (Davey Boy and Stevie Boy)	3 March 2013	ICW Get To Da Choppa	Glasgow, Scotland	1	175	This was a Ladder match	
3	The New Age Kliq (BT Gunn and Chris Renfrew)	25 August 2013	ICW Dave's Not Here Man!	Edinburgh, Scotland	1	154	This was a four way elimination match also featuring Fight Club (Kid Fite and Liam Thomson) and The Coffey Brothers (Joe Coffey and Mark Coffey).	
—	Vacated	26 January 2014	—	—	—	—	Vacated due to a double pinfall in match against The Bucky Boys at The Third Annual Square Go	
4	The Sumerian Death Squad (Michael Dante and Tommy End)	30 March 2014	ICW Still Smokin	Glasgow, Scotland	1	35	This was a three-way ladder match also featuring The Bucky Boys and The New Age Kliq (BT Gunn and Dickie Divers) for the vacant championship.	
5	The Bucky Boys (Davey Boy and Stevie Boy)	4 May 2014	ICW A Show in London	London, England	2	84	This was a three-way match also featuring The New Age Kliq (BT Gunn and Dickie Divers).	
—	Vacated	27 July 2014	—	—	—	—	The Bucky Boys were forced to vacate the championship due to Davey Boy suffering a knee injury.	
6	The New Age Kliq (BT Gunn and Chris Renfrew)	27 July 2014	ICW Shug's Hoose Party	Glasgow, Scotland	2	14	Kay Lee Ray substituted for an injured Davey Boy in this match.	
7	Irn Jew (Colt Cabana and Grado)	10 August 2014	ICW Everything is Coming Up in Milhouse Tour - You Have The Right To Remain Dead	Edinburgh, Scotland	1	14		
8	The New Age Kliq (BT Gunn and Chris Renfrew)	24 August 2014	ICW Everything is Coming Up in Milhouse Tour - Ice To See You	Edinburgh, Scotland	3	42	This was a three-way match also featuring Kay Lee Ray and Stevie Boy.	
9	The Hooligans (Paul London and Brian Kendrick)	5 October 2014	ICW Magical Mystery Tour - Helter Skelter	Newcastle, England	1	28		
10	Polo Promotions (Jackie Polo and Mark Coffey)	2 November 2014	ICW Fear and Loathing VII	Glasgow, Scotland	1	413		
11	The 55 (Kid Fite and Sha Samuels)	20 December 2015	ICW Friday Night Fight Club Taping	Glasgow, Scotland	1	105	Aired via tape delay on 25 December 2015.	
12	Polo Promotions (Jackie Polo and Mark Coffey)	3 April 2016	Barramania II	Glasgow, Scotland	2	21	This was an "I Quit Throw in the Towel" match where the manager of the losing team would be forced to leave ICW. As per pre-match stipulation, James R. Kennedy was forced to leave the promotion.	
—	Vacated	24 April 2016	—	—	—	—	Red Lightning stripped Polo Promotions, a tournament was held to determine the new champions, participants include the Sumerian Death Squad, The 55, the Local Fire and the Filthy Generation.	
13	Local Fire (Davey Boy and Joe Hendry)	31 July 2016	ICW Shug's Weekender - Shug's Hoose Party 3	Glasgow, Scotland	1 (3, 1)	42	Defeated Mike Bird and Wild Boar in tournament final to win the vacant titles.	
14	Polo Promotions (Jackie Polo and Mark Coffey)	11 September 2016	ICW Fight Club Taping	Glasgow, Scotland	3	147	This was a ladder match. The title was renamed as the ICW Undisputed Tag Team Championship.	
15	The Marauders (Mike Bird and Wild Boar)	5 February 2017	6th ICW Square Go!	Newcastle, England	1	287		
16	Polo Promotions (Jackie Polo and Mark Coffey)	19 November 2017	ICW Fear & Loathing X	Glasgow, Scotland	4	63		
17	The P.O.D (Ashton Smith and Rampage Brown)	21 January 2018	ICW Fight Club - It's Always Raining In Glasgow	Glasgow, Scotland	1	84		
18	The Kinky Party (Jack Jester and Sha Samuels)	15 April 2018	ICW Fight Club: Live In Newcastle	Newcastle, England	1 (1, 2)	231		
19	The P.O.D (Ashton Smith and Rampage Brown)	2 December 2018	ICW Fear & Loathing XI	Glasgow, Scotland	2	84	The P.O.D. cashed in the contract they had won in a six-team Tables, Ladders and Chairs match earlier in the evening and successfully defeated then champions, The Kinky Party, who had just defeated Bram and Iestyn Rees to retain the championship.	
20	The Kings of Catch (Aspen Faith and Lewis Girvan)	February 24, 2019	8th ICW Square Go!	Glasgow, Scotland	1	252		
21	The Purge (Krobar and Stevie James)	3 November 2019	ICW Fear & Loathing XII - Day 2	Glasgow, Scotland	1	91	This was a "Kings of Insanity" tornado tag team match.	
22	The Fite Network (Krieger and Lou King Sharp)	2 February 2020	9th Annual Square Go!	Glasgow, Scotland	1	412	This was a Glasgow Street Fight.	
23	The Nine9 (Dickie Divers and Jack Morris)	20 March 2021	ICW Fight Club #164 - ICW Barred	Glasgow, Scotland	1	246	This was a steel cage match.	
24	The Kings Of The North (Bonesaw and Damien Corvin)	21 November 2021	Fear & Loathing XIII - Night 2	Glasgow, Scotland	1	286		
25	Glasgow Grindhouse (Krieger and Lou King Sharp)	3 September 2022	Whit's Occurin'?!	Glasgow, Scotland	2	78		
26	KoE (Adam King and Marcus King)	20 November 2022	Fear & Loathing XIV	Glasgow, Scotland	1	175		
27	Chris Bungard and Paul Craig	14 May 2023	Get The F Out	Glasgow, Scotland	1	91	This was a Submission match.	
—	Vacated	13 August 2023	ICW Shug's Hoose Party 8	Glasgow, Scotland	—	—		
28	The Young Team (Jimmy Pierce and Logan Smith)	13 August 2023	ICW Shug's Hoose Party 8	Glasgow, Scotland	1	181	Defeated Arcade Violence (Brody Turnbull and Jake Lawless) to win the vacant titles.	
29	KoE (Adam King and Marcus King)	10 February 2024	ICW The 12th Annual Square Go!	Glasgow, Scotland	2	203		
—	Vacated	31 August 2024	—	—	—	—	The titles were vacated due to KoE not being medically able to defend their titles at ICW Barred III.	
30	Arcade Violence (Brody Turnbull and Jake Lawless)	1 September 2024	ICW Barred III	Glasgow, Scotland	1	259	Defeated POD (Ashton Smith and Rampage Brown) in a Steel Cage match to win the vacant titles.	
31	SAnitY (Big Damo and Axel Tischer)	18 May 2025	ICW We Run This Town	Glasgow, Scotland	1	105		
32	Arcade Violence (Brody Turnbull and Jake Lawless)	31 August 2025	ICW I Assure You, We're Open	Glasgow, Scotland	2	210	This was a gauntlet tag team match also involving Ben Rodgers & Landon Riley, Lykos Gym (Kid Lykos and Kid Lykos II) and BT Gunn.	
33	The Dangerous Brothers (BT Gunn and Kez Evans)	29 March 2026	ICW So's Yer Maw III	Glasgow, Scotland	1 (4, 1)	219+	This was a triple threat tag team match also involving KOE(Adam King and Marcus King)	

== Combined reigns ==
As of November 3, 2026.

=== By team ===
†	Indicates the current champion

Rank	Champion	No. of reigns	Combined days
1	Polo Promotions (Jackie Polo and Mark Coffey)	4	644
2	The Fite Network/Glasgow Grindhouse (Krieger and Lou King Sharp)	2	490
3	Arcade Violence (Brody Turnbull and Jake Lawless)	2	469
4	KoE (Adam King and Marcus King)	2	378
5	The Marauders (Mike Bird and Wild Boar)	1	287
6	The Kings of the North (Bonesaw and Damien Corvin)	1	286
7	The Bucky Boys (Davey Boy and Stevie Boy)	2	261
8	The Kings of Catch (Aspen Faith and Lewis Girvan)	1	252
9	The Nine9 (Dickie Divers and Jack Morris)	1	246
10	The Kinky Party (Jack Jester and Sha Samuels)	1	231
11	The Dangerous Brothers (BT Gunn and Kez Evans) †	1	219+
12	The New Age Kliq (BT Gunn and Chris Renfrew)	3	210
13	The S.T.I. (Dickie Divers and William Grange)	1	182
14	The Young Team (Jimmy Pierce and Logan Smith)	1	181
15	The P.O.D (Ashton Smith and Rampage Brown)	2	168
16	The 55 (Kid Fite and Sha Samuels)	1	105
16	SAnitY (Big Damo and Axel Tischer)	1	105
18	Chris Bungard and Paul Craig	1	91
18	The Purge (Krobar and Stevie James)	1	91
20	Local Fire (Davey Boy and Joe Hendry)	1	42
21	The Sumerian Death Squad (Michael Dante and Tommy End)	1	35
22	The Hooligans (Paul London & Brian Kendrick)	1	28
23	Irn Jew (Colt Cabana and Grado)	1	14

=== By wrestler ===
Rank	Champion	No. of reigns	Combined days
1	Jackie Polo	4	644
1	Mark Coffey	4	644
3	Krieger	2	490
3	Lou King Sharp	2	490
5	Dickie Divers	2	428
6	Brody Turnbull	2	469
6	Jake Lawless	2	469
8	BT Gunn †	4	429+
9	Adam King	2	378
9	Marcus King	2	378
11	Sha Samuels	2	336
12	Davey Boy	3	303
13	Mike Bird	1	287
13	Wild Boar	1	287
15	Bonesaw	1	286
15	Damien Corvin	1	286
17	Stevie Boy	2	261
18	Aspen Faith	1	252
18	Lewis Girvan	1	252
20	Jack Morris	1	246
21	Jack Jester	1	231
22	Kez Evans †	1	219+
23	Chris Renfrew	3	210
24	William Grange	1	182
25	Jimmy Pierce	1	181
25	Logan Smith	1	181
27	Ashton Smith	2	168
27	Rampage Brown	2	168
29	Kid Fite	1	105
29	Big Damo	1	105
29	Axel Tischer	1	105
32	Krobar	1	91
32	Stevie James	1	91
32	Chris Bungard	1	91
32	Paul Craig	1	91
36	Joe Hendry	1	42
37	Michael Dante	1	35
37	Tommy End	1	35
39	Brian Kendrick	1	28
39	Paul London	1	28
41	Colt Cabana	1	14
41	Grado	1	14

== See also ==
- Insane Championship Wrestling
- ICW World Heavyweight Championship
- ICW Zero-G Championship
- ICW Women's Championship
