= Al Pereira =

American professional wrestler (1906–1990)

Personal information
- Born: Alfred Pereira; August 8, 1906 Half Moon Bay, California, United States
- Died: January 15, 1990 (aged 83) Multnomah, Portland, Oregon, United States
- Spouse: Nellie Pereira
- Children: 1

Professional wrestling career
- Ring name(s): Al Pereira; Al Perry
- Billed height: 6 ft 2 in (188 cm)

Alfred Pereira (August 8, 1906 to January 15, 1990) was an American professional wrestler, known as Al "Power House" Pereira. He held the European Heavyweight Championship twice.

== Early life ==
Pereira was born in Half Moon Bay, California, the son of Portuguese immigrants.

== Professional wrestling career ==
Pereira won the European Heavyweight Championship in July 1937 in Paris, France, defeating Henri Deglane. He later lost the title to Dan Koloff, later reclaimed it and then lost it again to Koloff.

== Personal life and death ==
Pereira later opened "Al Pereira's Inn" in Honolulu, Hawaii. In 1933–36, Pereira was living at 144 N27th St, San Jose, California. In 1935 or 1936, Pereira married Nellie (born 1902/03), and they had a son, Alfred D Pereira Jr. In 1937 Alf and Nellie Pereira were living in Oakland, California. In later life, Pereira lived in Reno, Nevada. On January 15, 1990, Pereira died in Multnomah, Portland, Oregon.

== Championships and accomplishments ==
- European Heavyweight Championship (2 times)
- World Heavyweight Championship (European version) (1 time)
