= Pro Wrestling Elite =

Scottish professional wrestling promotion

- Acronym: PWE
- Founded: 2011
- Defunct: 2019
- Style: British Wrestling
- Headquarters: Ayr, Scotland, UK
- Founder: Adrian McAllum
- Owner: Adrian McAllum

Pro Wrestling Elite (PWE) was an independent professional wrestling promotion based in Ayr, Scotland, UK. It was owned and operated by Adrian "Lionheart" McAllum until his death by suicide on 19 June 2019.

== History ==
PWE debuted on 9 July 2011 with Birth of the Elite which featured Noam Dar, Kris Travis, BT Gunn, Kay Lee Ray, Mikey Whiplash and Wolfgang.

On 16 September 2012, PWE crowned their first PWE World Heavyweight Champion when Andy Wild was victorious in a two-night tournament that included El Ligero, Nick Aldis, Noam Dar, Wolfgang and others.

PWE promoted a number of notable international and UK talent, including AJ Styles, Drew Galloway, Joe Coffey, Zack Sabre Jr., Samoa Joe, Mark Haskins, Nikki Storm, Robbie E, X-Pac, Billy Gunn, Dave Mastiff, Mickie James, Mark Coffey, Kenny Williams, Big Damo, Joe Hendry, Stevie Xavier, James Storm, Mr. Anderson, Bram, Rockstar Spud, Chris Masters and Pete Dunne. PWE also hosted a ROH World Tag Team Championship match with The Addiction (Christopher Daniels & Frankie Kazarian) defending against The Coffey Brothers.

After McAllum's death, PWE's final event, 8th Anniversary Show, took place with the Scottish wrestling scene ensuring it still took place as a tribute to McAllum.

This final event featured Leyton Buzzard, Kez Evans, Aaron Echo, Daz Black, Liam Thomson and saw Andy Wild defeat BT Gunn and Alexander Dean to win the vacant Union of European Wrestling Alliances European Heavyweight Championship left vacant by Lionheart's death, as well as Grado defeating Jackie Polo to win the PWE World Heavyweight Championship.

Though PWE is inactive, Grado has continued to defend the PWE World Heavyweight Championship at events like British Championship Wrestling's Believe: A Night to Remember Lionheart (vs. Sha Samuels) and for his own Grado's Big Family Bash specials, where he has traded the title with Jack Jester.

== See also ==
- WWE NXT UK
- Insane Championship Wrestling
- British Championship Wrestling
- Lionheart
