= Scottish Heavyweight Championship =

Professional wrestling championship

Details
- Promotion: NWA UK Hammerlock (2004–2013); Scottish Wrestling Alliance (2004–2019); BOP Wrasslin (2023–present)
- Current champion: Vacated
- Date won: 19 June 2019

Other name
- NWA Scottish Heavyweight Championship (2004–2013)
Statistics
- First champion: Conscience
- Most reigns: Adam Shame, Eric Canyon and Lionheart (3 reigns)
- Longest reign: Mikey Whiplash (673 days)
- Shortest reign: Majik and Raging Bull (<1 day)

The Scottish Heavyweight Championship is a professional wrestling singles title in BOP Wrasslin (formerly the Scottish Wrestling Alliance).

== Title history ==
It was first won by Conscience who defeated Eric Canyon, Adam Shane, and Hatred in Scotland on 17 July 2004. The title has generally been defended in Scotland, particularly in Bellshill, Bellahouston, Clydebank and Glasgow. It was originally created for British National Wrestling Alliance (NWA)-affiliated promotion NWA UK Hammerlock. The title was first defended outside of Scotland at the NWA 56th Anniversary Show in Winnipeg, Manitoba, Canada in 2004. Following the closure of NWA UK Hammerlock, the title was taken on by the Scottish Wrestling Alliance and the "NWA" was dropped from the name, resulting in the title simply being called the Scottish Heavyweight Championship.

On June 19 2019, the Scottish Heavyweight Championship was vacated along with the ICW World Heavyweight Championship and UEWA European Heavyweight Championship due to the death of Lionheart, the holder of these titles.

The reactivated championship was won by Jack Jester on 4 August 2023.

=== Reigns ===
Key
No.	Overall reign number
Reign	Reign number for the specific champion
Days	Number of days held
<1	Reign lasted less than a day
+	Current reign is changing daily

No.	Champion	Championship change			Reign statistics		Notes	Ref.
No.	Champion	Date	Event	Location	Reign	Days	Notes	Ref.
1	Conscience	17 July 2004	Rebirth	Bellshill	1	259	Defeated Eric Canyon, Adam Shane, and Hatred to become first champion.	
—	Vacated	2 April 2005	—	—	—	—		
2	Eric Canyon	2 April 2005	Last Rites	Bellshill	1	140	Defeated Majik in a steel cage match to win the vacant title.	
3	Majik	20 August 2005	Rebirth 2: Battlezone	Bellshill	1	<1		
4	Eric Canyon	20 August 2005	Rebirth 2: Battlezone	Bellshill	2	462	This was a Battlezone match.	
5	Adam Shame	25 November 2006	November 2 Remember	Bellshill	1	175		
—	Vacated	19 May 2007	—	—	—	—	Title vacated after Shame suffers an ankle injury.	
6	Falcon	19 May 2007	Rebirth IV: The Battlezone Returns!	Bellshill	1	84	Won a Battlezone match to win the vacant title.	
7	Johnny Moss	11 August 2007	Laird of the Ring	Clydebank	1	49		
8	Jack Jester	29 September 2007	The Gathering	Glasgow	1	112		
9	Adam Shame	19 January 2008	New Year's Retribution	Bellshill	2	119		
—	Vacated	17 May 2008	—	—	—	—		
10	Wolfgang	17 May 2008	Battlezone IV: Interesting Times	Bellshill	1	119	Won a Battlezone match that was also for the SWA Tag Team Championship and SWA Laird of the Ring Championship to win the vacant title.	
11	Raging Bull	13 September 2008	N/A	Bellshill	1	<1		
12	Wolfgang	13 September 2008	N/A	Bellshill	2	7		
13	Lionheart	20 September 2008	The Gathering II: A Call to Arms	Glasgow	1	127		
14	Adam Shame	25 January 2009	After Hours	Glasgow	3	41	This was a last man standing match.	
15	B.T. Gunn	7 March 2009	N/A	Glasgow	1	84	This was a three-way match also involving Lionheart.	
16	Lionheart	30 May 2009	Battlezone 2009	Glasgow	2	112		
17	Scott Renwick	19 September 2009	The Gathering III	Glasgow	1	525	This was a three-way match also involving Wolfgang.	
18	Eric Canyon	February 26, 2011	The Gathering IV	Glasgow	3	181		
19	Andy Anderson	26 August 2011	Clan Wars 2011	Motherwell	1	280		
20	Mikey Whiplash	1 June 2012	New Testament – Night 1	Govan	1	673	During Whiplash's reign, the title is withdrawn from the NWA and is renamed the Scottish Heavyweight Championship on 12 January 2013.	
21	Joe Coffey	5 April 2014	Clan Wars 2014 – 10th Anniversary	Motherwell	1	196		
22	Doug Williams	18 October 2014	SWA/Zero-1 Battlezone 2014	Motherwell	1	188		
23	Drew Galloway	24 April 2015	Rebirth 2015 – Night 1	Paisley	1	217		
24	Mark Coffey	27 November 2015	Autumn Tour – Night 1	Paisley	1	365		
25	Joe Coffey	26 November 2016	N/A	N/A	2	462		
26	Timm Wylie	3 March 2018	Live in Paisley	Paisley	1	398		
27	Lionheart	5 April 2019	Motherwell Mania	Motherwell	2	75		
—		19 June 2019	—	—			Vacated after Lionheart's death on 19 June.	

== See also ==
- List of National Wrestling Alliance championships
