= Dave Mastiff =

English professional wrestler

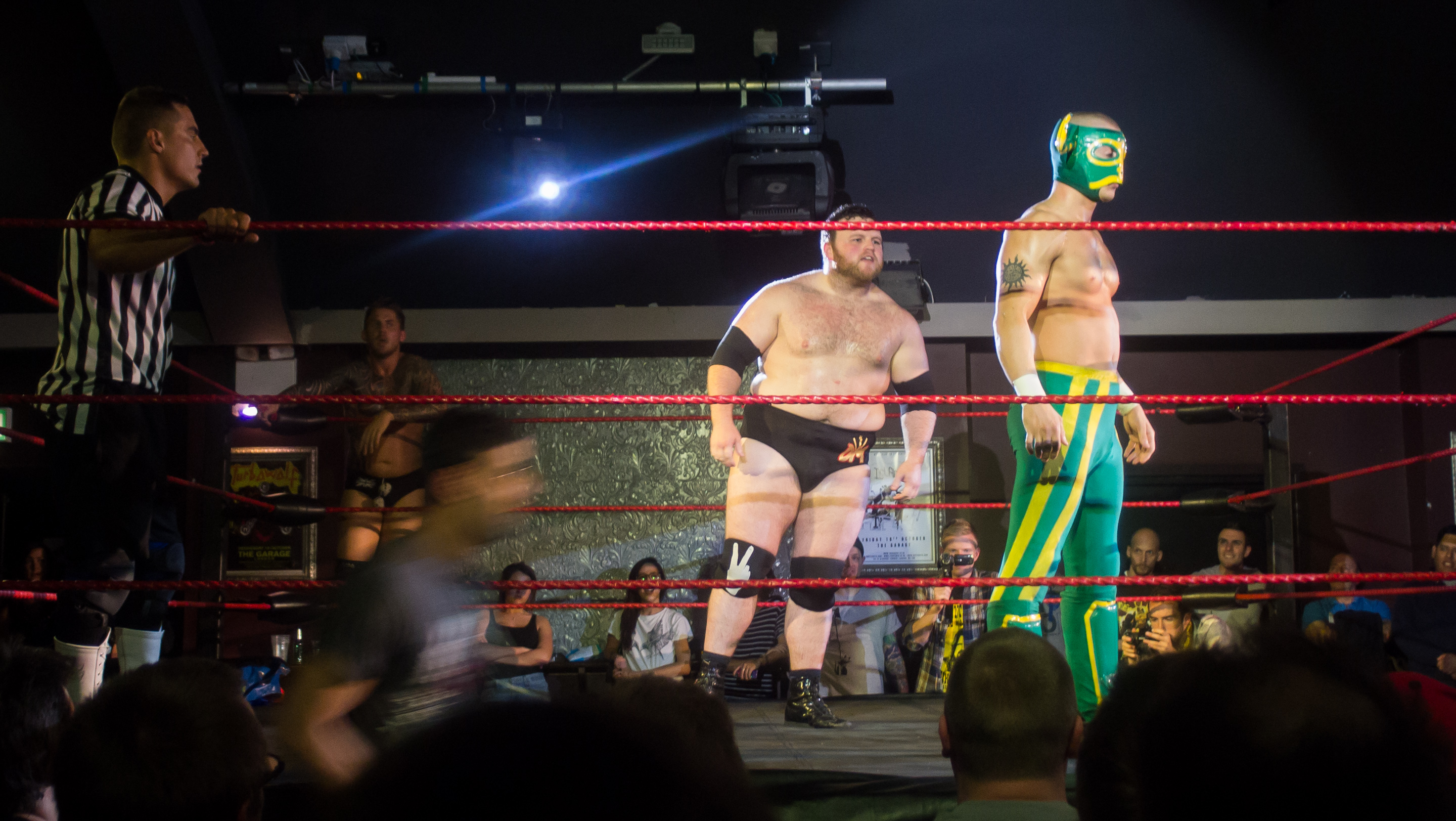
- Mastiff (middle) in September 2012

Personal information
- Born: David Minton; 21 July 1984 (age 42) Dudley, West Midlands, England

Professional wrestling career
- Ring name(s): Dave Mastiff; Dave Moralez; Moralez
- Billed height: 5 ft 10 in (1.78 m)
- Billed weight: 322 lb (146 kg)
- Billed from: The Black Country, England
- Debut: 2002

David Minton (born 21 July 1984) is an English professional wrestler. He is most known for his time in WWE, where he performed on its NXT UK brand under the ring name "Bomber" Dave Mastiff.

== Professional wrestling career ==
Mastiff debuted in 2002 as Moralez (later Dave Moralez). In his early career he would work for One Pro Wrestling, Frontier Wrestling Alliance and Westside Xtreme Wrestling.

He held a number of titles on the independents. On 14 September 2013 in Lionheart's Pro Wrestling Elite promotion, Mastiff cashed in his contract from winning the Elite Rumble to interrupt a match between El Ligero and PWE World Heavyweight Champion Andy Wild and win the title himself. On 11 July 2015 Mastiff defeated Chris Masters for the PCW Heavyweight Championship, which he would hold for 210 days and defend against Adam Cole, Nick Aldis, Samoa Joe, Bobby Lashley and Roderick Strong before he was defeated by Sha Samuels.

Mastiff has also worked for Insane Championship Wrestling, PROGRESS Wrestling, 5 Star Wrestling, All Star Wrestling, WhatCulture Pro Wrestling, Revolution Pro Wrestling, Over the Top Wrestling and numerous others.

=== Total Nonstop Action Wrestling (2014–2015) ===
Mastiff appeared for Total Nonstop Action Wrestling (TNA) in 2014 on the second season of TNA British Boot Camp. Mastiff’s first match on the show was aired on 9 November, when he defeated Rampage Brown. In his second match of the show, which aired on 30 November, Mastiff was once again victorious in an eight-person tag team match alongside Brown, Angelina Love and Noam Dar where they defeated Al Snow, Grado, Kay Lee Ray and Mark Andrews. Mastiff advanced to the final six, but the competition was eventually won by Andrews.

Through January 2015, Mastiff worked couple matches on Xplosion, where he lost to Mandrews (formerly known as Mark Andrews) and Samoa Joe.

=== World of Sport Wrestling (2016) ===
On 11 November 2016, Mastiff defeated Grado to win the inaugural WOS Championship, however, Mastiff lost the championship to Grado on the same episode.

=== WWE ===
==== NXT UK (2018–2022) ====
Mastiff made his WWE debut on 9 June 2018, when he participated in the United Kingdom Championship Tournament. Mastiff advanced from the first round after defeating Kenny Williams, however, was eliminated in the quarter-finals by Joe Coffey. Mastiff made his NXT UK debut on the first episode of the show which aired on 17 October, when he defeated Sid Scala.

Mastiff, who was yet to be defeated on NXT UK, fought Eddie Dennis to a double disqualification on the 2 January 2019 episode of the show. This led to a No Disqualification match on NXT UK TakeOver: Blackpool, on 12 January, which Mastiff won.

On the 5 June episode of NXT UK, Mastiff competed in a Fatal four-way match against Joe Coffey, Jordan Devlin and Travis Banks to determine the #1 contender for the WWE United Kingdom Championship. Banks won the match, as Mastiff suffered his first loss on the show. After Coffey and Mastiff wrestled to a double countout on the 7 August episode of NXT UK, both faced in a Last Man Standing match on NXT UK TakeOver: Cardiff, on 31 August, when Mastiff was defeated.

On the 30 January 2020 episode of NXT UK, Mastiff lost a six-man tag team match with Mark Andrews and Flash Morgan Webster, against Imperium's Marcel Barthel, Fabian Aichner and Alexander Wolfe. On the February 13 episode of NXT UK, Mastiff defeated Saxon Huxley.

On 18 August 2022 Mastiff was released from his WWE contract.

== Personal life ==
On 17 October 2020, Minton announced his marriage.

== Championships and accomplishments ==
- Anti-Watershed Wrestling
  - AWW Heavyweight Championship (1 times)
- Athletik Club Wrestling
  - ACW World Wrestling Championship (1 time)
- Attack! Pro Wrestling
  - Attack! 24:7 Championship (1 time)
- Be. Catch Company
  - BCC Championship (1 time, inaugural)
  - BCC Championship Tournament (2010)
- Big League Wrestling
  - BLW Tag Team Championship (1 time) – with Big Grizzly
- Fight Club: Pro
  - FCP Championship (1 time)
- International Pro Wrestling: United Kingdom
  - IPW:UK World Championship (1 time)
- Power of Wrestling
  - POW Tag Team Championship (1 time) – with Douglas Williams
- Preston City Wrestling
  - PCW Heavyweight Championship (1 time)
- Pro Wrestling Elite
  - PWE Heavyweight Championship (1 time)
- Pro Wrestling Illustrated
  - Ranked No. 307 of the top 500 singles wrestlers in the PWI 500 in 2019
- Real Quality Wrestling
  - RQW Tag Team Championship (1 time) – with Jack Storm
  - RQW Tag Team Championship Tournament (2007) – with Jack Storm
- Vertigo Pro Wrestling
  - VPW Heavyweight Championship (1 time, inaugural)
  - VPW Heavyweight Championship Tournament (2015)
- World of Sport Wrestling
  - WOS Championship (1 time)
