= European Heavyweight Championship =

Professional wrestling championship

The European Heavyweight Championship is a name used for various top titles competed for throughout the European professional wrestling circuit. The title was recognised as official by UK national TV network ITV for the purposes of their coverage of the UK wrestling scene and by its listings magazine TVTimes in accompanying magazine feature coverage.

The title was defended in many promotions in Europe, and other versions of this one title also appeared in certain promotions. On August 25, 2001 the European Wrestling Union produced a European Heavyweight Championship tournament in Bochum, Germany, bringing in wrestlers some of whom claimed to already be the champion. This tournament saw these titles merge into one with Britain's Robbie Brookside confirming his claim as champion by defeating American "Five Star" Cory K in a championship decider.

The title history below shows all the holders of the traditional/"old school" title in chronological order plus some major "new school" versions. However, there are instances where another wrestler has taken the role of champion, or claimed the title but no official title change was recorded (these are noted with "unknown title history", or other details.)

== Title history ==
=== BWA European Heavyweight Championship history ===
The European Heavyweight Championship is a professional wrestling championship owned by British Wrestling Association.

Key
No.	Overall reign number
Reign	Reign number for the specific champion
Days	Number of days held

No.	Champion	Championship change			Reign statistics		Notes	Ref.
No.	Champion	Date	Event	Location	Reign	Days	Notes	Ref.
1	Heinrich Froehner	N/A	House show	N/A	1	N/A		
2	Atholl Oakeley	1932	House show	N/A	1	N/A		
3	Heinrich Froehner	1933	House show	N/A	2	N/A		
4	Karl Pojello	1933	House show	Nottingham, Great Britain	1	N/A		
5	Henri Deglane	April 1934	House show	N/A	1	N/A		

=== FFCP European Heavyweight Championship history ===
The European Heavyweight Championship is a professional wrestling championship owned by Fédération Française de Catch Professionnel.

Key
No.	Overall reign number
Reign	Reign number for the specific champion
Days	Number of days held

No.	Champion	Championship change			Reign statistics		Notes	Ref.
No.	Champion	Date	Event	Location	Reign	Days	Notes	Ref.
6	Dan Koloff	April 7, 1934	House show	Paris, France	1	N/A		
7	Henri Deglane	N/A	House show	N/A	2	N/A		
—		N/A	—	—				
8	Al Pereira	July 1937	House show	Paris, France	1	N/A		
9	Dan Koloff	1937	House show	N/A	2	N/A		
10	Al Pereira	1937	House show	N/A	2	N/A		
11	Dan Koloff	1937	House show	N/A	3	N/A		
—		N/A	—	—				

=== Corporación Internacional de Catch (Spain) European Heavyweight Championship history ===
The European Heavyweight Championship is a professional wrestling championship.

Key
No.	Overall reign number
Reign	Reign number for the specific champion
Days	Number of days held

No.	Champion	Championship change			Reign statistics		Notes	Ref.
No.	Champion	Date	Event	Location	Reign	Days	Notes	Ref.
12	Felix Lamban	1940s	House show	N/A	1	N/A	Lamban holds the title during several shows.	
13	Victorio Ochoa	1940s	House show	N/A	1	N/A		
—		N/A	—	—				

=== JP European Heavyweight Championship history ===
The European Heavyweight Championship was a professional wrestling championship owned by Joint Promotions.

Key
No.	Overall reign number
Reign	Reign number for the specific champion
Days	Number of days held

No.	Champion	Championship change			Reign statistics		Notes	Ref.
No.	Champion	Date	Event	Location	Reign	Days	Notes	Ref.
14	Yvar Martinson	1949	House show	N/A	1	N/A		
15	Felxi Miquet	November 8, 1949	House show	Paris, France	1	N/A		
—		N/A	—	—				
16	Jack Dale	N/A	House show	N/A	1	N/A		
17	Jose Tarres	August 28, 1948	House show	Barcelona, Spain	1	N/A		
—		N/A	—	—				
18	Bert Assirati	1949	House show	N/A	1	N/A		
—	Vacated	August 1952	—	—	—	—	After Assirati left for India.	
19	Shirley Crabtree	1952	House show	N/A	1	N/A	Crabtree defeated Yvar Martinson for the vacant title.	
20	Joe Robinson	1952	House show	N/A	1	N/A		
21	Vicente Febrer	1952	House show	N/A	1	N/A		
—		N/A	—	—				
22	Milo Popocopolis	1961	House show	N/A	1	N/A		
23	Shirley Crabtree	1961	House show	N/A	2	N/A		
—		N/A	—	—				
24	Jim Olivera	1961	House show	N/A	1	N/A		
25	Billy Joyce	1961	House show	N/A	1	N/A		
26	Billy Robinson	June 12, 1965	House show	Manchester, Great Britain	1	N/A		
—	Vacated	1970	—	—	—	—	After Robinson left for North America.	
27	Horst Hoffman	July 1971	House show	Cologne, West Germany	1	N/A		
28	Albert Wall	February 4, 1974	House show	N/A	1	N/A		
29	René Lassatasse	1977 (NLT)	House show	N/A	1	N/A		
30	Hans Streiger	1978	House show	Stuttgart, West Germany	1	N/A		
31	Pete Curry	March 24, 1978	House show	Liverpool, Great Britain	1	N/A		
32	Wild Angus	1978	House show	N/A	1	N/A		
—	Vacated	1978	House show	N/A	—	—	Wild Angus was stripped of the title.	
33	Hans Streiger	N/A	House show	N/A	2	N/A		
34	Steve Veidor	September 15, 1978	House show	Liverpool, Great Britain	1	N/A		
35	Hans Streiger	1979	House show	N/A	3	N/A		
36	Johnny Kincaid	1980	House show	Hamburg, West Germany	1	N/A		
—		N/A	—	—				
37	Wayne Bridges	N/A	House show	N/A	1	N/A		
38	Kwick-Kick Lee	January 25, 1983	House show	London, Great Britain	1	N/A		

=== ASW European Heavyweight Championship history ===
The European Heavyweight Championship is a professional wrestling championship owned by All Star Wrestling. It also appeared on shows promoted by Orig Williams under the "British Wrestling Federation" banner, including his Welsh language TV wrestling programme Reslo on S4C.

Key
No.	Overall reign number
Reign	Reign number for the specific champion
Days	Number of days held

No.	Champion	Championship change			Reign statistics		Notes	Ref.
No.	Champion	Date	Event	Location	Reign	Days	Notes	Ref.
—		N/A	—	—				
39	Pat Roach	March 1990	House show	N/A	1	N/A		
40	Giant Haystacks	February 6, 1991	House show	Great Britain	1	N/A		
41	Pat Roach	1991	House show	N/A	2	N/A		
—		N/A	—	—				
42	John Prayter	1995	House show	N/A	1	N/A		
—		N/A	—	—				
43	Rob Brookside	1999	House show	N/A	1	N/A	On August 25, 2001, Bochum, Germany, Brookside confirms his claim by winning the European Wrestling Union's European Heavyweight Championship tournament.	
44	Karl Krammer	October 10, 2001	House show	Berlin, Germany	1	N/A	Kramer won the title after Brookside did not defend it within its 60 days ruling.	
45	The Flatliner	February 1, 2002	House show	Exmouth, Great Britain	1	N/A		
—	Vacated	February 17, 2002	—	—	—	—	After The Flatliner breaks his leg.	
46	Rob Brookside	February 19, 2002	House show	Yeovil, Great Britain	2	N/A	Brookside defeated Justin Starr in a tournament final for the vacant title.	
47	The Flatliner	2003	House show	Exeter	2	N/A	Won a 20-man battle royal	
—	Vacated	2010	—	—	—	—	All Star recognises the UEWA championship from 2010 onwards	

=== UEWA European Heavyweight Championship history ===
The European Heavyweight Championship is a professional wrestling championship owned by Union of European Wrestling Alliances. All Star Wrestling regards this version as a continuation of its own version of 1990-2003 (see above). In addition to the UEWA's partner promotions across Europe, the title has also been contested within Pro Wrestling Elite, Fife Pro Wrestling Asylum, British Championship Wrestling, Iron Girders Pro Wrestling and Insane Championship Wrestling in the United Kingdom and in Tira, Israel for All Wrestling Organization, among others.

The current champion is BT Gunn who is in his first reign. Andy Roberts set records for longest reign and most cumulative days as champion while retaining the title against Doug Williams, Kez Evans, BT Gunn, James Mason, Wild Boar, Charlie Sterling, Rampage Brown, Jason Reed, Kenny Williams and others to also set the record for the most successful defences in the title's history.

UEWA European Heavyweight Championship

Details
- Promotion: Union of European Wrestling Alliances
- Date established: 24 April 2010
- Current champion: BT Gunn
- Date won: 16 March 2025
Statistics
- First champion: Rampage Brown
- Most reigns: Chaos (2 reigns)
- Longest reign: Andy Roberts (1,673 days)
- Shortest reign: Mikey Whiplash (<1 day)

Individual Reigns

Key
No.	Overall reign number
Reign	Reign number for the specific champion
Days	Number of days held

No.	Champion	Championship change			Reign statistics		Notes	Ref.
No.	Champion	Date	Event	Location	Reign	Days	Notes	Ref.
1	Rampage Brown	April 24, 2010	UEWA European Heavyweight Title Tournament	Buchholz, Germany	1	161	Won an Eight-Man-Tournament	
2	Mikey Whiplash	October 2, 2010	ASW	Hanley, England	1	<1		
3	James Mason	October 2, 2010	All-Star Wrestling	Hanley, England	1	231		
4	"Bad Bones" John Kay	May 21, 2011	CWN 5th Anniversary Show	Pinneberg, Germany	1	329		
5	Chaos	April 14, 2012	DPW	Viborg, Denmark	1	1,280		
6	Drew Galloway	October 16, 2015	Maximum Wrestling	Kiel, Germany	1	2	Defeats Chaos and Apu Singh in 3-way match.	
—	Vacated	October 18, 2015	—	—	—	—		
7	Chaos	October 18, 2015	DPW - Evening Show	Randers, Denmark	2	20	Defeats Steinbolt. Galloway forced to vacate title due to travel issues.	
8	Erik Isaksen	November 7, 2015	NWF PowerSlam XIII	Oslo, Norway	1	1,281		
9	Alexander Dean	May 11, 2019	NWF Heteslag 2019	Oslo, Norway	1	36		
10	Lionheart	June 16, 2019	ICW I Ain't Yer Pal, Dickface!	Glasgow, Scotland	1	3		
—	Vacated	June 19, 2019	—	—	—	—	Title vacated after Lionheart's death.	
11	Andy Wild / Andy Roberts	July 20, 2019	PWE 8th Anniversary Show	Ayr, Scotland	1	1,673	Originally won the title under the name Andy Wild.	
12	Robert Star	February 17, 2024	VALOR Live In Kirkintilloch	Kirkintilloch, Scotland	1	393		
13	BT Gunn	March 16, 2025	VALOR Superslam	Glasgow, Scotland	1	407+		

Combined Reigns

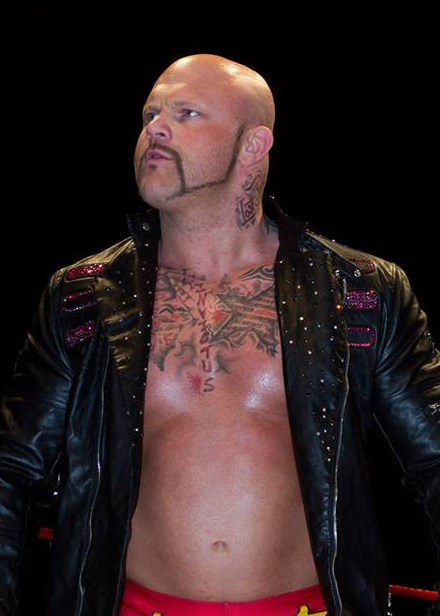
Former champion Bad Bones

†	Indicates the current champion
<1	The reign is shorter than one day.

Rank	Wrestler	No. of reigns	Combined days
1	Andy Roberts	1	1,673
2	Chaos	2	1,300
3	Erik Isaksen	1	1,281
4	BT Gunn †	1	407+
5	Robert Star	1	393
6	Bad Bones	1	329
7	James Mason	1	231
8	Rampage Brown	1	161
9	Alexander Dean	1	36
10	Lionheart	1	3
11	Drew Galloway	1	2
12	Mikey Whiplash	1	<1

=== FCW European Heavyweight Championship history ===
The European Heavyweight Championship was a professional wrestling championship owned by British "new school" promotion Freestyle Championship Wrestling.

=== FWA European Heavyweight Championship history ===
The European Heavyweight Championship was a professional wrestling championship owned by British "new school" promotion Frontier Wrestling Alliance.

=== ICWA / NWA European Heavyweight Championship history ===
The European Heavyweight Championship was a professional wrestling championship owned by French "new school" promotion International Catch Wrestling Alliance.

Key
No.	Overall reign number
Reign	Reign number for the specific champion
Days	Number of days held

No.	Champion	Championship change			Reign statistics		Notes	Ref.
No.	Champion	Date	Event	Location	Reign	Days	Notes	Ref.
1	Fritz Hellmeister (Eric Schwarz)	July 16, 2005	House show	Bruay-sur-l'Escaut	1	469		
2	"Bad Bones" John Kay	October 28, 2006	House show	Hesdin	1	784		
3	Eric Schwarz	December 20, 2008	House show	Lille	2	N/A		

== See also ==
- European Greco-Roman Heavyweight Championship
- NXT United Kingdom Championship
- WWE European Championship
