= Lionheart (UK wrestler) =

British professional wrestler (1982–2019)

Personal information
- Born: Adrian McCallum; 17 December 1982 Coventry, England
- Died: 19 June 2019 (aged 36) Ayr, Scotland

Professional wrestling career
- Billed height: 6 ft 1 in (185 cm)
- Billed weight: 15 st 5 lb (215 lb; 98 kg)
- Trained by: Colin McKay
- Debut: 2002

Adrian McCallum (17 December 1982 – 19 June 2019) was a British professional wrestler, professional wrestling promoter and actor, better known by his ring name Lionheart. He wrestled for numerous promotions in the British Independent wrestling circuit including Insane Championship Wrestling, in which he reigned as the ICW World Heavyweight Champion until his death, and Preston City Wrestling. He was also the owner of Ayrshire-based wrestling promotion Pro Wrestling Elite.

== Professional wrestling career ==
=== Insane Championship Wrestling ===
On 11 February 2007 Lionheart made his Insane Championship Wrestling debut, losing to James Wallace. On 3 April 2016, Lionheart captured the Insane Championship Wrestling Zero-G Championship from Davey Boy in a 6-way match at ICW Barramania II. He then proceeded to lose the title to Kenny Williams in a 7 Man Stairway to Heaven Match with Aaron Echo, Andy Wild, Iestyn Rees, Liam Thomson and Zack Gibson on 20 November at Fear & Loathing IX. On 2 December 2018 he won the ICW World Heavyweight Championship for the first time in his career, defeating former champion Jackie Polo in a Career vs. Title Match at Fear and Loathing XI. He wrestled his final match on June 16, 2019 at ICW: Fight Club, he defeated Alexander Dean to retain the ICW World Heavyweight Championship and to win the European Heavyweight Championship. Both titles were vacated after his death.

Lionheart was posthumously inducted into the ICW Hall of Fame in 2023.

=== Preston City Wrestling ===
On 23 September 2011, Lionheart made his Preston City Wrestling debut on their "Road to Glory" show, defeating Jack Gallagher. In March 2014, at a Preston City Wrestling show, McCallum's neck was broken in two places after receiving the Styles Clash following a match against AJ Styles. As a result of the injury doctors warned McCallum that he may never walk again. Just over a year later, McCallum defied doctors' orders and returned to in-ring competition in March 2015.

=== Other promotions ===
In 2008, McCallum competed for the ROH World Championship against then-champion Nigel McGuinness at a One Pro Wrestling show in a triple threat match also involving Keith Myatt. In January 2011, McCallum competed for Total Nonstop Action Wrestling (TNA), losing to Jeff Jarrett at a houseshow in Glasgow, Scotland. Later that year he also competed for WWE, losing to Justin Gabriel in a dark match on SmackDown in Liverpool, England.

== Death ==
On 19 June 2019, McCallum's death was announced on Twitter by ICW. It was ruled he ended his own life.

McCallum had last tweeted the previous evening, in which he quoted the TV series After Life: "One day you will eat your last meal, you will smell your last flower, you will hug your friend for the last time. You might not know it's the last time, that's why you must do everything you love with passion."

== Legacy and honours ==
Numerous tributes would be paid to Lionheart after his death, including from Drew McIntyre and The Rock. The final scheduled Pro Wrestling Elite event went ahead weeks after his death in tribute to him. This event featured Grado, Jack Jester, BT Gunn, Leyton Buzzard and saw Andy Wild win the UEWA European Heavyweight Championship which Lionheart's death had left vacant.

Insane Championship Wrestling hosted the Lionheart League tournament on the WWE Network between 28 November 2020 and 6 February 2021. The finals saw Sha Samuels defeat Stevie Boy.

Lionheart was inducted into the ICW Hall of Fame on 18 June 2023 by The Kinky Party (Jack Jester and Sha Samuels).

== Championships and accomplishments ==
- British Championship Wrestling
  - BCW Heavyweight Championship (2 times)
  - BCW Openweight Championship (1 time)
- Danish Pro Wrestling
  - DPW Heavyweight Championship (1 time)
- HOPE Wrestling
  - Royal Rumble (2015)
- Insane Championship Wrestling
  - ICW World Heavyweight Championship (1 time)
  - ICW Zero-G Championship (2 times)
  - ICW Hall of Fame (2023)
- New Generation Wrestling
  - NGW Tag Team Championship (1 time) – with Joe Hendry and Kid Fite
- One Pro Wrestling
  - 1PW World Heavyweight Championship (1 time)
  - 1PW World Heavyweight Title Tournament (2011)
- Premier British Wrestling
  - PBW Heavyweight Championship (1 time)
  - PBW Tag Team Championship (1 time) – with Wolfgang
- Preston City Wrestling
  - PCW Heavyweight Championship (3 times)
  - PCW Tag Team Championship (1 time) – with Sha Samuels
  - Who Dares Wins Rumble (2013)
- Pro Wrestling Elite
  - PWE Tag Team Championship (1 time) – with Lou King Sharp
- Real Deal Wrestling
  - RDW Heavyweight Championship (1 time)
- Scottish Wrestling Alliance
  - NWA / SWA Scottish Heavyweight Championship (3 times)
  - Money In The Bank (2008)
  - Battlezone (2018)
- Triple Team Promotions
  - King of the Castle (2007)
  - European Heavyweight Championship (1 time)
- WrestleZone
  - WrestleZone Heavyweight Championship (1 time)
  - WrestleZone No Limits Championship (1 time)

== See also ==
- List of premature professional wrestling deaths
