= Mikey Whiplash =

English professional wrestler

Personal information
- Born: Michael John Gilbert; 16 July 1980 (age 46) Stoke on Trent, Staffordshire, England

Professional wrestling career
- Billed height: 6 ft 2 in (188 cm)
- Billed weight: 14 st 9 lb (205 lb; 93 kg)
- Billed from: Stoke on Trent, Staffordshire
- Trained by: Chris Curtis
- Debut: 2000

Michael John Gilbert (born 16 July 1980) is an professional wrestler and promoter, best known by his ring name Mikey Whiplash. He resides in Glasgow, Scotland, and has previous wrestled for numerous promotions on the British Independent circuit.

Gilbert was the owner and promoter of two Glasgow-based wrestling ventures: Fierce Females and Source Wrestling school. He ceased involvement with Fierce Females following abuse allegations stemming from the Speaking Out movement and explicit messages sent to a young trainee.

== Professional wrestling career ==
Between 2002 and 2012, he was a full-time regular for All Star Wrestling. Gilbert has also wrestled for London-based promotion Progress Wrestling. In 2009 he defeated France's Thomas La Ruffa for the World Heavy Middleweight Championship (formerly held by Mark Rocco, Fuji Yamada, Robbie Brookside, Bryan Danielson and others). In ASW he defeated Rampage Brown for the European Heavyweight Championship before losing it to James Mason the same day on 2 October 2010.

Whiplash wrestled extensively for Insane Championship Wrestling where he is a former ICW Heavyweight Champion and Zero-G Champion. He wrestled the likes of Drew Galloway, Grado, Andy Wild, Wolfgang, Jack Jester, Joe Hendry, Angélico, Jordan Devlin, Jimmy Havoc, Sabu, Stevie Boy, Joe Coffey and Zack Sabre Jr.

== Championships and accomplishments ==
- All Star Wrestling
  - British Tag Team Championship (1 time) - with Robbie Dynamite
  - All Star People's Championship (1 time)
  - World Heavy Middleweight Championship (1 time)
- British Championship Wrestling
  - BCW Tag Team Championship (1 time) - with Jack Jester
- Insane Championship Wrestling
  - ICW Heavyweight Championship (1 time)
  - ICW Zero-G Championship (1 time)
- International Pro Wrestling: United Kingdom
  - IPW:UK Tag Team Championship (1 time) - with Robbie Dynamite
- Pride Wrestling
  - Pride Wrestling Championship (1 time)
- Revolution Pro Wrestling
  - Undisputed British Tag Team Championship (1 time) – with Robbie Dynamite
- Scottish Wrestling Alliance
  - NWA Scottish Heavyweight Championship (1 time)
- Target Wrestling
  - Target Wrestling Championship (1 time)
  - Target Wrestling Tag Team Championship (1 time) - with James Scott and Martin Kirby
- TNT Extreme Wrestling
  - DOA Deathmatch Tournament (2019)
  - TNT Extreme Division Championship (1 time)
- World Wide Wrestling League
  - European Heavyweight Championship (1 time)
  - Seven Deadly Sins Tournament (2014)
