= ICW World Heavyweight Championship (Scotland) =

Professional wrestling championship

Details
- Promotion: Insane Championship Wrestling
- Date established: 15 October 2006
- Current champion: Mark Coffey
- Date won: 24 May 2026

Other names
- ICW National Heavyweight Championship; ICW Heavyweight Championship; Undisputed ICW Championship
Statistics
- First champion: Drew Galloway
- Most reigns: BT Gunn (3 reigns)
- Longest reign: Darkside (1028 days)
- Shortest reign: Joe Coffey, Jason Reed (<1 day)

The ICW World Heavyweight Championship is a professional wrestling world heavyweight championship owned by Scotland's Insane Championship Wrestling promotion. The title was first established as the ICW National Heavyweight Championship at ICW's debut show on 15 October 2006, with Drew Galloway becoming the inaugural champion. On 7 February 2015, the title was officially renamed the ICW World Heavyweight Championship after Galloway successfully defended the title in a match against Matt Hardy for the Family Wrestling Entertainment promotion in New York. The championship has been defended in the United Kingdom, Ireland, the United States, Australia, Denmark, Italy, Germany, Spain, Sweden and Canada. In addition to these international title matches, defenses televised in 38 countries via Fight Network as well as an international presence on iPPV.

Overall, there have been twenty-seven reigns shared among twenty wrestlers, with three vacancies. The championship was vacant for 74 days as ICW had to strip Noam Dar of the title on 7 September 2021 due to COVID-19 restrictions.

The championship was featured prominently in both the Insane Fight Club documentaries produced by the BBC.

== History ==
Drew Galloway became the inaugural champion of Mark Dallas' ICW promotion on 15 October 2006 at their debut show "Fear & Loathing," having won a triple threat match against Darkside and Allan Grogan.

Initially a regional heavyweight title in the Glasgow area, the title was defended outside Scotland for the first time by Jack Jester, who defeated Jimmy Havoc in London, England to retain the title on 4 May 2014. It was first defended overseas by Drew Galloway on 20 December 2014 in Denmark for Dansk Pro Wrestling promotion, when Galloway won a Title-for-Title Three-Way match against DPW Champion Michael Fynne and Chaos. Galloway then announced his intention to take the title overseas more often and make it a World Championship. His second international title defense was booked for 7 February 2015 against Matt Hardy in New York, USA after which the title was officially renamed the ICW World Heavyweight Championship. The ICW World Heavyweight Championship was defended in Australia for the first time on 20 March 2015 when Galloway retained in a Title-for-Title match over OCW Championship Andy Phoenix at an Outback Championship Wrestling show. The title was first defended in Northern Ireland when Galloway retained over Joe Hendry, TRON and Luther Valentine in a four-way match at a Pro Wrestling Ulster. Galloway again defended the title in America on 18 July 2015 at a Warriors of Wrestling show in Staten Island where he retained over Joey Ace, Matt Macintosh and Logan Black. Galloway defended the championship in Kiel, Germany at a Maximum Wrestling show on 16 October, retaining in a Title-for-Title triple threat over UEWA European Heavyweight Champion Chaos and Apu Singh. Big Damo would go on to win the championship from Chris Renfrew in Northern Ireland, before defending the title successfully in Wales and Ireland on ICW's 2016 tour. The title was defended in Italy for the first by Wolfgang on 17 December 2016. Another notable international title defense saw Trent Seven retain the title over Wolfgang on 2 April 2017, at a WWE WrestleMania Axxess show. Leyton Buzzard made the first defences of the title in Sweden, Spain and Canada in 2022 and 2023.

In addition to these international title matches, numerous wrestlers from outside Scotland have challenged for the title domestically, including Kassius Ohno, Sabu, Fergal Devitt, Martin Stone, Doug Williams, Rhino, Colt Cabana, Tommy End, Noam Dar, Pete Dunne, Jordan Devlin, Dave Mastiff, Robbie Dynamite, Zack Gibson, Johnny Moss, Rampage Brown, Kris Travis, Keith Lee, Kassius Ohno, and Bram. The only non-Scottish wrestlers to hold the championship are Mikey Whiplash, Big Damo, Trent Seven and Leyton Buzzard.

The title was defended in a pre-show Dark matches for the first time in its history on 17 October 2015 when Drew Galloway would retain the title three times in consecutive matches against Matt Daly, Stephen Hughes and Coach Trip.

The title had to be vacated on 19 June 2019 due to Lionheart's death by suicide three days after his UEWA vs. ICW title match against Alexander Dean at ICW I Ain't Yer Pal, Dickface!.

=== Statistics ===
As of November 2017, BT Gunn has the record for most reigns, with three. Darkside's first reign is the longest in the title's history, at 1028 days (the company was largely inactive during this period), while Joe Coffey's reign is the shortest, as he lost the title the same day. Drew Galloway currently holds the record for the most defenses, both within an individual reign and cumulatively. Joe Coffey holds the record for least successful defenses in a single reign, losing the championship to Wolfgang in his first defense.

== Title history ==
Key
No.	Overall reign number
Reign	Reign number for the specific champion
Days	Number of days held
<1	Reign lasted less than a day
+	Current reign is changing daily

No.	Champion	Championship change			Reign statistics		Notes	Ref.
No.	Champion	Date	Event	Location	Reign	Days	Notes	Ref.
1	Drew Galloway	15 October 2006	Fear & Loathing	Glasgow, Scotland	1	280	Defeated Allan Grogan and Darkside in a triple threat match to become the inaugural champion.	
2	Darkside	22 July 2007	ReZerection	Glasgow, Scotland	1	1,028	This was a fatal five-way match also involving Jack Jester, Liam Thomson, and Wolfgang.	
—	Vacated	15 May 2010	—	—	—	—	Darkside was stripped of the title due to injury.	
3	BT Gunn	5 June 2010	Menace 2 Society	Glasgow, Scotland	1	91	This was a four-way elimination match for the vacant title also involving Johnny Moss, Liam Thompson and Wolfgang.	
4	James Scott	4 September 2010	Dazed and Confused	Glasgow, Scotland	2	505	Scott previously known as Darkside.	
5	BT Gunn	22 January 2012	1st Annual Square Go!	Glasgow, Scotland	2	133		
6	Red Lightning	3 June 2012	In Your Gaff	Glasgow, Scotland	1	336	Cashed in his "Square Go!".	
7	Mikey Whiplash	5 May 2013	Reservoir Dogs	Glasgow, Scotland	1	161	Cashed in his "Square Go!".	
8	Jack Jester	13 October 2013	Fear & Loathing VI - Welcome To Bat Country	Glasgow, Scotland	1	385		
9	Drew Galloway	2 November 2014	Fear & Loathing VII	Glasgow, Scotland	2	378	Title was renamed the ICW World Heavyweight Championship on 7 February 2015 following numerous international title defenses.	
10	Grado	15 November 2015	Fear & Loathing VIII	Glasgow, Scotland	1	70		
11	Chris Renfrew	24 January 2016	5th Annual Square Go!	Glasgow, Scotland	1	34	Cashed in his "Square Go!".	
12	Big Damo	27 February 2016	Hey Look! It's That Mad Wrestling Thing Aff The Telly Tour - The Big Elbowski	Belfast, Northern Ireland	1	155		
13	Joe Coffey	31 July 2016	Shug's Weekender - Shug's Hoose Party 3	Glasgow, Scotland	1	<1		
14	Wolfgang	31 July 2016	Shug's Weekender - Shug's Hoose Party 3	Glasgow, Scotland	1	189	Cashed in his "Square Go!".	
15	Trent Seven	5 February 2017	6th Annual Square Go!	Newcastle upon Tyne, England	1	70		
16	Joe Coffey	16 April 2017	Barramania III	Glasgow, Scotland	2	217	Cashed in his "Square Go!".	
17	BT Gunn	19 November 2017	Fear & Loathing X	Glasgow, Scotland	3	161	This was a winner takes all match, in which Gunn defended the ICW Zero-G Championship.	
18	Stevie Boy	29 April 2018	Barramania 4	Glasgow, Scotland	1	91	Cashed in his "Square Go!" contract during a singles match between BT Gunn and Mikey Whiplash, converting it into a triple threat match and subsequently pinned Whiplash to win the match.	
19	DCT	29 July 2018	Shug's Hoose Party 5 - Night 2	Glasgow, Scotland	1	56	This was a Loser Leaves The UK match.	
20	Jackie Polo	23 September 2018	Fight Club	Glasgow, Scotland	1	70		
21	Lionheart	2 December 2018	Fear & Loathing XI	Glasgow, Scotland	1	199	This was a title vs. career match.	
—	Vacated	19 June 2019	—	—	—	—	Title vacated after Lionheart's death.	
22	Stevie Boy	28 July 2019	Shug's Hoose Party 6 - Night 2	Glasgow, Scotland	2	189	Defeated Wolfgang for the vacant title.	
23	Noam Dar	2 February 2020	9th Annual Square Go!	Glasgow, Scotland	1	583		
—	Vacated	7 September 2021	—	—	—	—	Title vacated due to Dar being unable to defend the title because of the COVID-19 pandemic.	
24	JAXN	20 November 2021	Fear & Loathing XIII - Night 1	Glasgow, Scotland	2	1	Defeated Kez Evans for the vacant title. JAXN previously known as Jackie Polo.	
25	Kez Evans	21 November 2021	Fear & Loathing XIII - Night 2	Glasgow, Scotland	1	364		
26	Leyton Buzzard	20 November 2022	Fear & Loathing XIV	Glasgow, Scotland	1	175	Buzzard last pinned Kez Evans in Four-Way Elimination match. Also in the match were Stevie James and Craig Anthony. The event will air at a later date on the WWE Network.	
27	Aaron Echo	14 May 2023	Get The F Out	Glasgow, Scotland	1	210	Cashed in his "Square Go!" after Buzzard retained against Big Damo and Andy Roberts.	
28	Jack Jester	10 December 2023	Fear & Loathing XV	Glasgow, Scotland	2	266	This was a title vs. career King of Insanity match.	
29	Kenny Williams	1 September 2024	ICW Barred III	Glasgow, Scotland	1	364	This was Williams's Square-Go cash-in match and it was contested in a Steel Cage match.	
30	Rhio	31 August 2025	Fear & Loathing XV	Glasgow, Scotland	1	266	This was a King of Insanity match. Rhio becomes the first woman to win the title.	
31	Jason Reed	24 May 2026	ICW: Wubba Lubba Dub Dub	Glasgow, Scotland	1	<1	Defeated Rhio and Dylan Thorn in a triple threat match.	
32	Mark Coffey	24 May 2026	ICW: Wubba Lubba Dub Dub	Glasgow, Scotland	1	163+	Cashed in his "Square Go!" briefcase.	

== Combined reigns ==
As of 3 November 2026.

†	Indicates the current champion

Rank	Wrestler	No. of reigns	Combined days
1	Darkside/James Scott	2	1,533
2	Drew Galloway	2	658
3	Jack Jester	2	651
4	Noam Dar	1	583
5	BT Gunn	3	385
6	Kez Evans	1	364
6	Kenny Williams	1	364
8	Red Lightning	1	336
9	Stevie Boy	2	280
10	Rhio	1	266
11	Joe Coffey	2	217
12	Aaron Echo	1	210
13	Lionheart	1	199
14	Wolfgang	1	189
15	Leyton Buzzard	1	175
16	Mark Coffey †	1	163+
17	Mikey Whiplash	1	161
18	Big Damo	1	155
19	Jackie Polo/JAXN	2	71
20	Grado	1	70
20	Trent Seven	1	70
22	DCT	1	56
23	Chris Renfrew	1	34
24	Jason Reed	1	<1
