= Pro Championship Wrestling =

British professional wrestling promotion

- Acronym: PCW
- Founded: 2011
- Headquarters: Preston, Lancashire, England
- Founder: Steven Fludder
- Owner: Steven Fludder
- Website: facebook.com/PCWlive

Pro Championship Wrestling (PCW UK) is a British owned independent professional wrestling promotion established as Preston City Wrestling in 2011. It was re-branded as Pro Championship Wrestling in 2020, and is still stylised as PCW. PCW runs the majority of its shows in Preston, in the county of Lancashire in England.

== History ==
Pro Championship Wrestling UK was founded in 2011 as Preston City Wrestling by Steven Fludder in Preston, Lancashire. Their first event was held on 26 August 2011 in Preston and they crowned their first PCW champion during the second show on 23 September. Many other notable British talents have also wrestled at PCW including Magnus, Drew Galloway, Rampage Brown, Andy Wild, Dave Mastiff, Jack Jester, James Mason, Lionheart, Rockstar Spud, Leyton Buzzard, Noam Dar, Kris Travis, Tyler Bate and Doug Williams. In 2013, it was announced that former boxing champion Riddick Bowe would sign his first contract with PCW and wrestle his first match in March 2014. However, on 14 December 2013, Preston City Wrestling announced on their Facebook Page that Bowe would no longer be appearing due to a disagreement with Bowe`s new agent. At "Tribute to the Troops" in 2014, approximately 2000 people were in attendance for the free (non paid) show, a record for a wrestling show in the United Kingdom outside of WWE or WCW shows. In June 2014 they announced their partnership with Ring of Honor (ROH) and presented their first show together called "Supershow of Honor" in November. In July 2015 it was announced that another four wrestling shows co-promoted by both organizations would occur in November 2015. On 27 November Adam Cole became the first Ring of Honor wrestler to gain a PCW title, winning the PCW Cruiserweight Championship from El Ligero. It was announced on Twitter that Billy Gunn signed with PCW for "Road To Glory 2016" show in February along with Tajiri. On 25 June 2016, PCW hosted the first HD iPPV in European wrestling history. In September 2016, PCW withdrew from its relationship with ROH and announced they were now working with American promotions Beyond Wrestling and Combat Zone Wrestling (CZW) and German promotion Westside Xtreme Wrestling (wXw).

== Championships ==
=== Current champions ===
Championship	Current champions	Date won	Event	Previous champions	Days held
PCW Heavyweight Championship	RP Davies	18 October 2025	PCW14 (PCW 14th Anniversary show 2025)	Big T	299+
PCW Tag Team Championship	Death Row (Dan Whyte and Kane Korso)	18 March 2023	PCW Road to Glory 2023	The Sausage Rolls (Axel Strife & Big Ste)	1244+
PCW Cruiserweight Championship	Jack Johnson	18 October 2025	PCW14 (PCW 14th Anniversary show 2025)	Jordan Kane	299+
PCW Women's Championship	Commander Stephanie Sterling	18 March 2023	PCW Road to Glory 2023	Lizzy Styles	1244+

=== Tournaments ===
Tournament	Current winner	Date won	Event
Road To Glory	RP Davies	15 March 2025	Road to Glory 2025
Kris Travis Memorial	Bubblegum	26 February 2017	Kris Travis Memorial Day 3

=== Road To Glory winners ===
- 2013: Noam Dar
- 2014: Chris Masters
- 2015: Bubblegum
- 2016: Rampage Brown
- 2018: Dean Allmark
- 2019: Joey Hayes
- 2020: Will Kroos
- 2022: Priscilla
- 2023: Philip Michael
- 2024: Rossy Rascal
- 2025: RP Davies
