= Jack Jester =

Scottish Professional Wrestler

Personal information
- Born: Lee Greig; 10 July 1987 (age 39) Glasgow, Scotland
- Website: https://twitter.com/glasgowjester

Professional wrestling career
- Billed height: 6 ft 1 in (185 cm)
- Billed weight: 19 st 0 lb 108 kg 238 lb

Lee Greig (born 10 July 1987) is a Scottish professional wrestler and actor, better known by his ring name Jack Jester. He wrestled for numerous promotions in the British independent wrestling circuit, but is best known for his work in Insane Championship Wrestling, Greig was a Wrestling Coach at GPWA Glasgow Asylum.

Greig has appeared for Xhamster videos and in several professional wrestling documentaries including The British Wrestler (VICE) and Smack 'Em Up (RTÉ). He was also one of the stars of BBC documentaries Insane Fight Club and Insane Fight Club 2. In 2016, Jester challenged Drew Galloway for the TNA World Heavyweight Championship in British Championship Wrestling.

He was raised in the Fernhill area of Rutherglen, and began wrestling at the age of 16.

== Professional Wrestling Career ==
Jester debuted in 1998. He won the Scottish Heavyweight Championship from Johnny Moss in 2007. He beat Mikey Whiplash for the ICW Heavyweight Championship in 2013, holding it for 385 days with defences against Sabu, Fergal Devitt, Joe Coffey, Grado, Wolfgang, Jimmy Havoc, Big Damo, Mark Coffey and Martin Stone before losing the title to Drew Galloway in 2015. Jester received two rematches but was unsuccessful.

On ICW: Fight Club in 2018, Jester and Sha Samuels defeated Rampage Brown and Ashton Starr for the ICW Tag Team Championships before losing them back to Brown and Starr at ICW: Fear & Loathing XI.

On 8 August 2022, Jester defeated Andy Wild, Krieger and Jason Reed to become number one contender to the ICW World Heavyweight Championship but was defeated by champion Kez Evans at ICW: Shug's Hoose Party 7.

== Acting career ==
Greig under his Jack Jester ring name had a small role in the 2014 Horror film The House of Him. Grieg starred in the pilot for and two seasons of the BBC Scotland comedy The Scotts between 2021 and 2022.

== Championships and accomplishments ==
- British Wrestling Revolution
  - BWR Anarchy Briefcase (2018)
  - BWR Heavyweight Championship (1 time)
- Insane Championship Wrestling
  - ICW World Heavyweight Championship (2 times)
  - ICW Tag Team Championship (1 time) – with Sha Samuels
  - King of Insanity (2022)
- British Championship Wrestling
  - BCW Cruiserweight Championship (2 times)
  - BCW Tag Team Championship (1 time) – with Mikey Whiplash
  - Fools Gold Rumble (2006)
- Jimmy Havoc Presents Wrestling
  - Hardcore Tournament (2016)
- Premier British Wrestling
  - PBW Heavyweight Championship (1 time)
  - PBW Heavyweight Title Tournament (2015)
- Preston City Wrestling
  - PCW Tag Team Championship (1 time) – with Sha Samuels
- Wrestling Experience Scotland
  - Scotland's Elite Championship (1 time, current)
- Pro Wrestling Elite
  - PWE World Heavyweight Championship (1 time)
- Scottish Wrestling Alliance
  - NWA Scottish Heavyweight Championship (2 time, current)
- House of Pain: Evolution
  - HOPE Championship (3 times)
- Rock N Wrestle
  - RNW/SWA Highland Championship (2 times)
- WrestleZone
  - WrestleZone Undisputed Championship (1 time)
