= British Championship Wrestling =

Scottish professional wrestling promotion

- Acronym: BCW
- Founded: 2003
- Style: British Wrestling
- Headquarters: East Kilbride, Scotland, UK
- Founder: Colin McKay
- Owner: Graham McKay

British Championship Wrestling (BCW) is an independent professional wrestling promotion based in East Kilbride, Scotland, UK. It is currently owned and operated by promoter Graham McKay (who also performs under the name Charles Boddington) after being founded by his brother Colin McKay (who performed as The Highlander) in 2003. It is one of the oldest promotions in Scottish professional wrestling.

== History ==
British Championship Wrestling was founded by Colin McKay in 2003, now run by his brother Graham McKay. As part of the fledgling Scottish wrestling scene in the 2000s, it hosted talent like Drew Galloway (where he held his first title), Wolfgang, Noam Dar, Lionheart, Grado, and others in their early careers.

BCW has hosted a number of title matches for other notable companies. These include Total Nonstop Action Wrestling, EVOLVE Wrestling, Dragon Gate USA, WhatCulture Pro Wrestling, Westside Xtreme Wrestling and the Union of European Wrestling Alliances.

Examples of these interpromotional title matches include Drew Galloway vs. Jack Jester for the TNA World Heavyweight Championship, Galloway vs. Marty Scurll for the EVOLVE Championship and Open the Freedom Gate Championship, Galloway vs. Matt Hardy for the WCPW World Championship, Andy Roberts vs. Doug Williams for the European Heavyweight Championship, Tracey Smothers vs. GTS for wZw Heavyweight Championship, Grado vs. Sha Samuels for the PWE World Heavyweight Championship and GTS & Iceman vs. T2K (Darkside & Wolfgang) for the WXW Tag Team Championship.

BCW was forced into inactivity due to the COVID-19 pandemic before returning on 9 April 2022 with ‘’Back 2 Business’’ which featured Joe Hendry, BCW Heavyweight Champion BT Gunn, UEWA European Heavyweight Champion Andy Wild, ICW World Heavyweight Champion Kez Evans, Doug Williams and Jody Fleisch.

== Controversies ==
In April 2012, BCW founder Colin McKay was arrested after the police were alerted that he had engaged in inappropriate conduct with minors. McKay was sentenced to three years and ten weeks in prison and was added to the Sex Offenders Register after pleading guilty to grooming teenagers and the statutory rape of a 15-year-old boy.

In 2017, BCW had a public dispute with Matt Sydal about a no-show and unreturned deposit. Eventually Impact Wrestling, Sydal's employer, stepped in to resolve the issue.

In 2020, former BCW Heavyweight Champion Ross Watson (Kid Fite), who also has a "working relationship" with BCW through his Premier British Wrestling school was named during Speaking Out. In the fall out of this, promotions like Discovery Wrestling ceased using Watson. BCW have kept him on their roster and have continued to book and promote him on their cards.
