= Gentleman Jack Gallagher =

English professional wrestler and mixed martial artist

Jack Gallagher
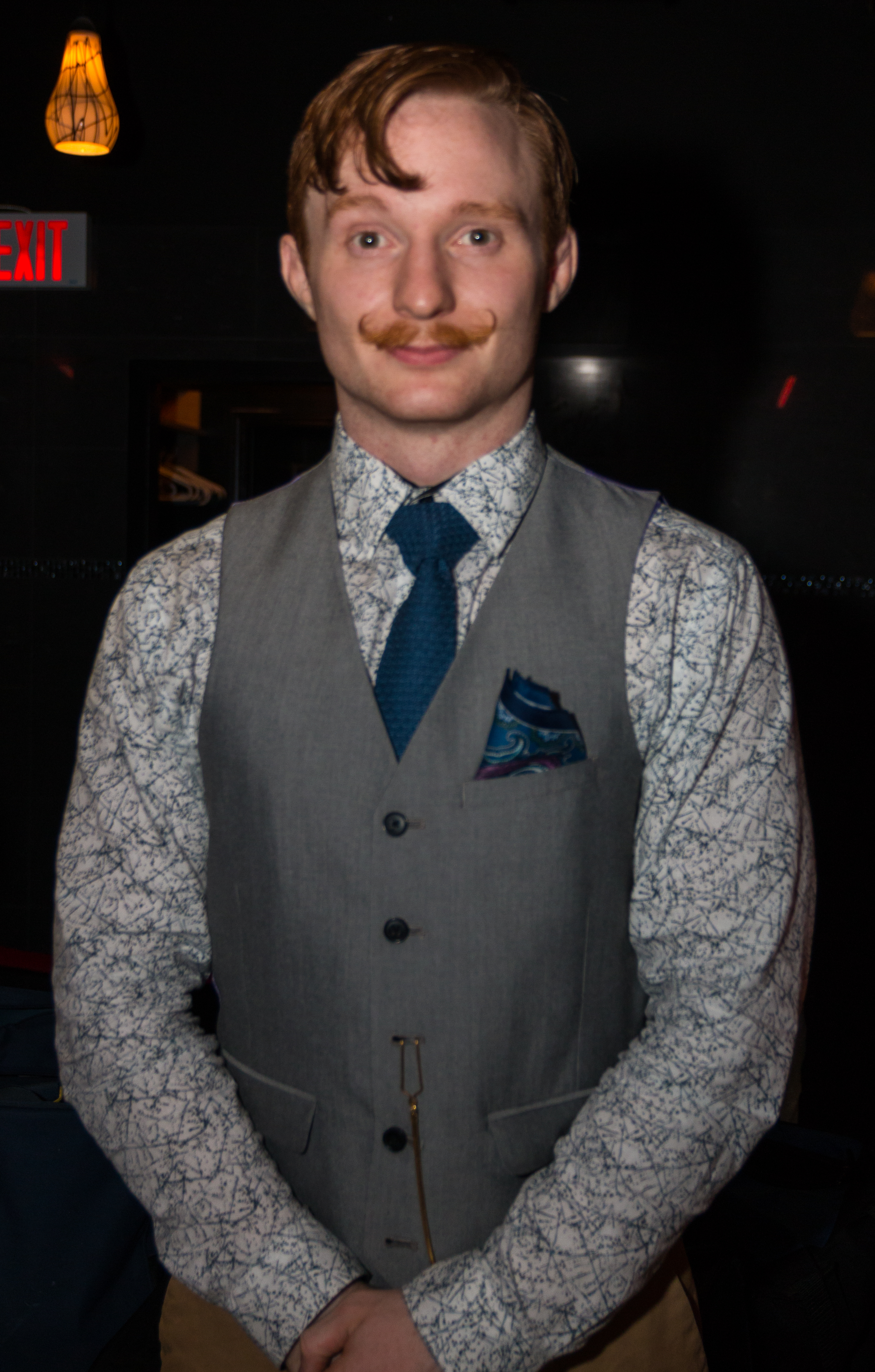
- Gallagher in 2016

Personal information
- Born: Oliver Westfield Claffey; 7 January 1990 (age 36) Manchester, England
- Spouse: Clara Sinclare (m. 2017)

Professional wrestling career
- Ring name(s): Gentleman Jack Gallagher; Jack Anthony; Jack Gallagher; Jack Toxic; Jack Claffey
- Billed height: 5 ft 8 in (1.73 m)
- Billed weight: 167 lb (76 kg)
- Billed from: Manchester, England
- Trained by: Alex Shane; Billy Robinson
- Debut: 4 November 2006
- Retired: 19 June 2020

Oliver Westfield Claffey (born 7 January 1990), better known by the ring name Jack Gallagher and most recently Jack Claffey, is an English mixed martial artist and a former professional wrestler. He is best known for his time in WWE, where he performed on the NXT and 205 Live brands, mostly under the ring name Gentleman Jack Gallagher.

Claffey had worked in the British Independent circuit since 2006. In 2016, he competed on the WWE tournament Cruiserweight Classic. After the tournament, he was signed to a WWE contract and worked on the 205 Live brand, exclusively for cruiserweights.

== Background ==
Inspired by Bruce Lee and Dragon Ball Z, Claffey started training taekwondo at a young age and continued it until the age of 16, in favor of previously overlapping professional wrestling practises. Around the age of 20, Claffey picked up catch wrestling and Brazilian jiu-jitsu in order to supplement his pro wrestling skills, which in turn piqued his interest in mixed martial arts.

== Professional wrestling career ==
=== Training and early career ===
Claffey was trained by Alex Shane and the Futureshock staff. He made his professional wrestling debut at the age of 16 on 4 November 2006 at Futureshock #11, under the ring name Jack Toxic, teaming up with Alex Cyanide, Danny Hope, and Kris Travis. They defeated El Ligero, Charity, Faith, and Jamal Lewis. He also trained in grappling, a catch wrestling style, at The Snake Pit in Wigan Borough. He received further training from Snake Pit alumnus Billy Robinson in the United States.

=== Independent circuit (2007–2016) ===
In the beginning of 2007, Toxic and Cyanide teamed up and eventually became Lethal Dose. They became a regular attraction at Futureshock, appearing on many shows. The team would have their first title shot at Grand Pro Wrestling's That's Entertainment when they took on WKD for the GPW Tag Team Championship. The team traveled to Real Deal Wrestling and, in February and April had two chances to become the RDW Tag Team Champions, but lost both times. They then went to Hull to wrestle for New Generation Wrestling where they won all their matches. With this run of success, they returned to Futureshock at Futureshock #27 and defeated three other teams to become the first FSW Tag Team Champions. However, they lost the titles to The Doogooders at Futureshock #29. They returned to GPW at Livin' On The Edge to take part in a number one contendership four-way elimination match and lost. For the rest of 2009, they continued to team up but found little championship success and split up.

Claffey, performing as Jack Toxic, made his singles debut at Grand Pro Wrestling West Park Fun Day and lost to Scarlett Web. Between March and April, Toxic tried to qualify for the Crazy Cruiser 8 2008 but failed multiple times; however, he won the Last Chance Saloon battle royal and therefore qualified for the tournament. On 2 May, he lost to El Ligero in the quarter-finals. At Justice For All, he defeated Bubblegum in a rumble qualifying match but was eliminated from the rumble. At Guts & Glory, he returned under the name Jack Gallagher to compete in a four way scrabble match for the GPW British Championship and lost. At Battlefield, he lost a thirty-minute iron man match involving Zack Diamond and Mikey Whiplash for the GPW British Championship; however, next month at Heroes & Villains, he defeated Diamond for the title. He held the championship until Do Or Die, in December, where he lost it to Ste Mann. Gallagher introduced his own belt, but lost it to Ste Mann, and took a 12-month break from Grand Pro.

Gallagher made his Grand Pro return at the 2013 Crazy Cruiser 8 where he defeated Bubblegum in the quarter-finals before being pinned by eventual winner El Ligero in the semi-finals. At the start of 2014, Gallagher was defeated by CJ Banks at "Back With A Bang", the beginning of a rivalry.

The rivalry between Gallagher and Banks continued into 2015 and at Back With A Bang, Banks picked up the win to end the feud. Following a loss to Chris Ridgeway at "Cruel Summer", Gallagher took another hiatus from Grand Pro.

Gallagher returned at Friday Night Thriller 9, participated in some more matches, and had his final appearance at the Dom Travis Memorial show, "A Night To Remember" when he defeated former tag team partner Cyanide.

On 8 June 2008, Claffey as Toxic, took part in the Lotto-Thunder Tournament and reached the semi-final where he was defeated by Jack Domino. On 13 September, he participated in the FSW Trophy Tournament 2009 and was eliminated in the first round by Sparx. In 2010, he began using the ring name Jack Gallagher. At Futureshock #48, Gallagher won the FSW Trophy Tournament 2010 when he defeated Dave Breaks in the final. On 6 November 2011, Gallagher defeated Dave Rayne to become the FSW Champion. He would hold the championship for fourteen months before losing it to Davey Richards at Futureshock #61. At Futureshock #62, he defeated Stixx and Zack Gibson to become the number one contender for the FSW Championship. Chris Egan announced that Gallagher would be facing Sonjay Dutt at FutureShock #74, but Gallagher instead faced Jay Lethal at FutureShock #74. At the event, Gallagher defeated Dutt by pinfall.

On 3 March 2013, he made his debut for Pro Wrestling Zero1 in Japan, under the ring name Jack Anthony. He joined a tag team match alongside Ikuto Hidaka. On 15 April 2013, Anthony came together with Craig Classic, James Raideen, Jason New, Maybach Beta, Sebastian Concrete, Steven Walters and Tama Williams to form a gaijin stable named "New Age Wrestling Future" (NWF) under the guidance of Akebono. The stable was shortly afterwards joined by Jonathan Gresham and Mark Coffey.

During his time in the independent circuit, he has also made appearances in Progress Wrestling, where he got his biggest win by defeating Pete Dunne for a qualifying position in the WWE Cruiserweight Classic. He made a return to Progress at New York City, where he was supposed to face Dunne for the WWE United Kingdom Championship, but was cancelled due to Dunne being injured. On 31 December, he made his return to Progress at Chapter 60: Unboxing Live, unsuccessfully challenging Dunne for the title.

=== WWE (2016–2020) ===
==== Cruiserweight Championship pursuits (2016–2017) ====
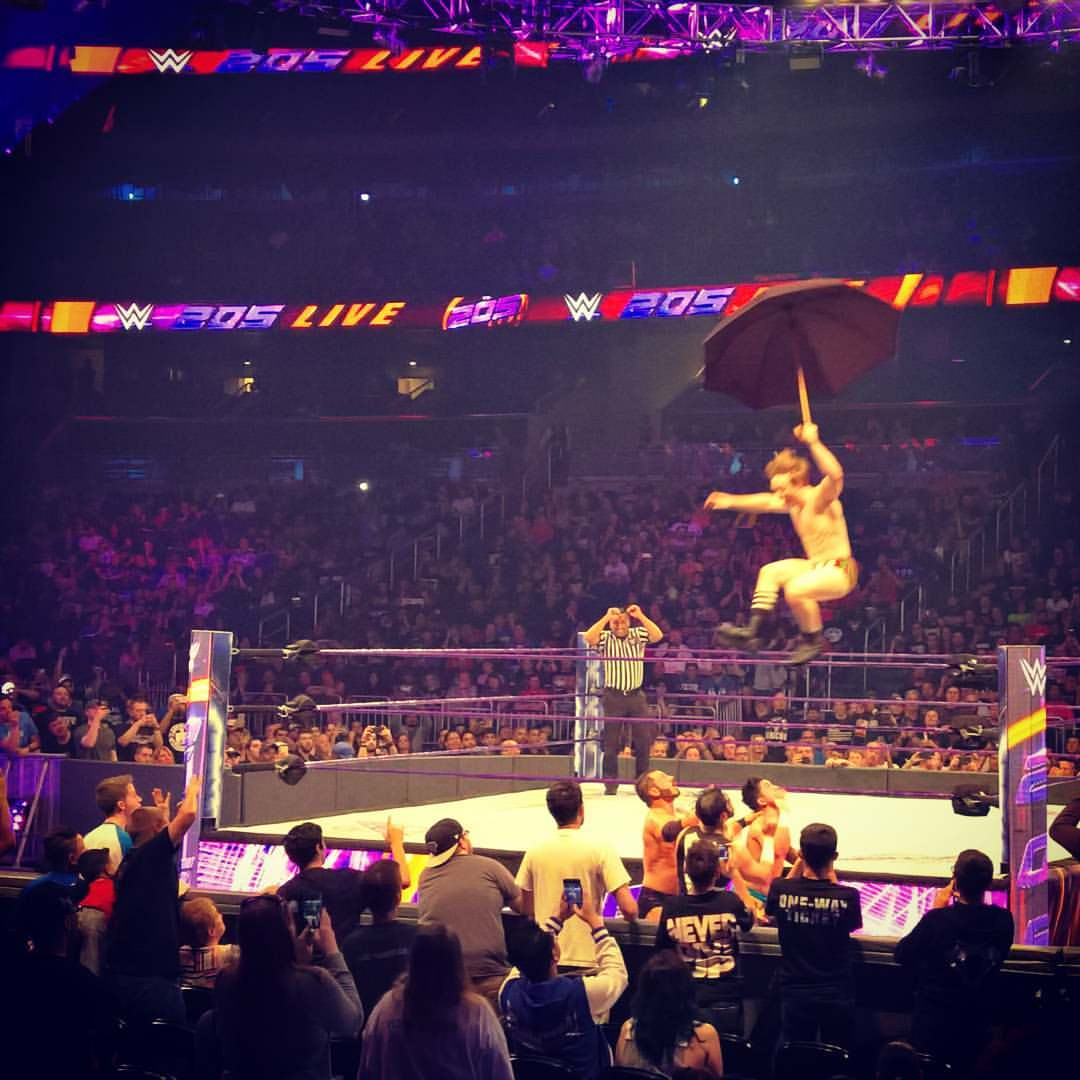
Gallagher jumps off the turnbuckle with an umbrella he calls "William III"

On 24 April 2016, Gallagher earned a place in the WWE Cruiserweight Classic by defeating Pete Dunne in a qualifier match at Progress Wrestling's Chapter 29. On 3 August, Gallagher defeated Fabian Aichner in his first round match, but was eliminated from the tournament by Akira Tozawa in his second round match.

On 29 November, on the inaugural episode of 205 Live, Gallagher made his debut, defeating Ariya Daivari. On 5 December episode of Raw, Gallagher defeated Daivari. On 27 December episode of 205 Live, Gallagher and Daivari participated in a Gentleman's Duel, where both men chose a weapon for their opponent and began the match back to back before moving five paces away from each other, but Daivari attacked Gallagher while his back was turned until Gallagher attacked him with a headbutt, causing Daivari to forfeit the duel. Their rivalry concluded in an "I forfeit" match on 17 January 2017 episode of 205 Live, which Gallagher won. On 29 January at the Royal Rumble event, Gallagher participated in the annual Royal Rumble match and was eliminated by Mark Henry. On 7 February episode of 205 Live, Gallagher defeated Cedric Alexander, Mustafa Ali, Noam Dar, and T. J. Perkins in a fatal five-way elimination match to become the number one contender for the WWE Cruiserweight Championship. At Fastlane, Gallagher faced Neville for the title in a losing effort. Gallagher made a guest appearance on 26 April episode of NXT, unsuccessfully challenging Tyler Bate for the WWE United Kingdom Championship in the main event.

==== Various storylines (2017–2020) ====
In June, Gallagher entered a feud with The Brian Kendrick, with Kendrick impersonating and mocking Gallagher after the latter's matches. Their feud ended on 29 August episode of 205 Live, in which Gallagher was defeated by Kendrick in a no disqualification match. On 12 September episode of 205 Live, Gallagher attacked Cedric Alexander during his match with The Brian Kendrick, turning heel in the process. To reflect his turn, Gallagher stopped wearing his fluorescent trunks and began wrestling in a full suit instead. He also switched to a more technical, ground-based style and began using the umbrella as a weapon. In June 2018, Gallagher and Kendrick formed an alliance with Drew Gulak. On 3 October episode of 205 Live, Gallagher and Gulak attacked Kendrick, calling him the "weakest link" in the faction. On 31 October episode of 205 Live, Gallagher was defeated by Kendrick after Akira Tozawa prevented the interference from Gulak. The two sides went on to trade victories over the next few weeks. On 19 December episode of 205 Live, Gallagher and Gulak were defeated by Kendrick and Tozawa in a Street Fight to end the feud. Starting in February 2019, Gallagher and Gulak attempted to recruit the debuting Humberto Carrillo to their faction while also trying to prevent him from using high flying moves and instead using a more ground based offence. On 9 April episode of 205 Live, after Gulak attacked Carrillo during his match with Gallagher, Gallagher came to the aid of Carrillo and headbutted Gulak out of the ring, turning face in the process.

In the following months, Gallagher would find himself in a losing streak, and after losing to Angel Garza on 29 November episode of 205 Live, he would headbutt General Manager Drake Maverick, thus turning heel again in the process. Gallagher returned on 28 February 2020 episode of 205 Live, attacking Lio Rush, while sporting a beard, shorter hairstyle and new tattoos covering his body. With his new attitude, Gallagher would develop a winning streak on 205 Live defeating the likes of Tyler Breeze and Oney Lorcan. On 10 April 2020 Gallagher was announced for the Interim Cruiserweight Championship Tournament representing Group B in the tournament. Gallagher lost to El Hijo del Fantasma and Akira Tozawa but was able to defeat Isaiah "Swerve" Scott to secure one win in the tournament.

On 19 June 2020, Claffey was released by WWE due to a historical sexual assault.

== Mixed martial arts career ==
Jack Claffey
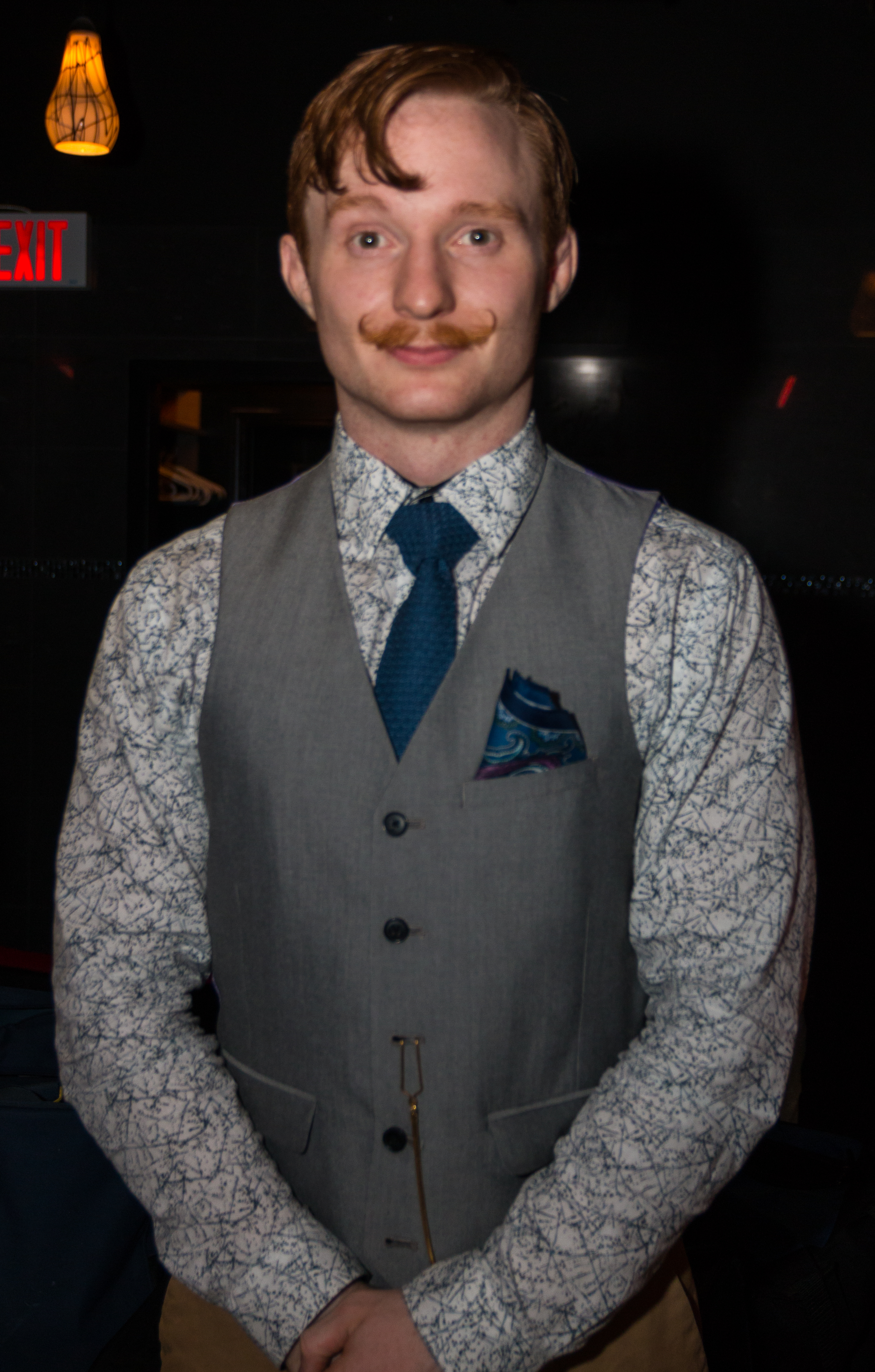
- Height: 5 ft 8 in (1.73 m)
- Weight: 135 lb (61 kg)
- Division: Bantamweight
- Team: Fighting Fit Manchester; Jungle MMA
- Years active: 2015–2016, 2022–present (MMA)

Mixed martial arts record
- Total: 5
- Wins: 2
- By submission: 1
- By decision: 1
- Losses: 3
- By knockout: 3

Amateur record
- Total: 2
- Wins: 2
- By submission: 2

Other information
- Mixed martial arts record from Sherdog

Claffey garnered a 2–0 record as an amateur mixed martial artist under the name Jack Claffey. However, he forwent his aspirations in the sport as he was signed to the WWE in 2016. A May 2019 report by the Wrestling Observer Newsletter alleged that there was interest from Bellator MMA about possibly recruiting Claffey for the promotion.

After being released from the WWE, Claffey started training in the sport again, and made his professional debut against Marlon Jones at Full Contact Contender 32 on 17 December 2022. He lost the debut via first-round technical knockout.

He was then scheduled to move up to featherweight and face Yassin Chtatou at Hexagone 8 on 3 June 2023. However, the whole event was cancelled due to bad weather conditions.

== Mixed martial arts record ==
Professional record breakdown
5 matches	2 wins	3 losses
By knockout	0	3
By submission	1	0
By decision	1	0

Res.	Record	Opponent	Method	Event	Date	Round	Time	Location	Notes
Loss	2–3	Anzor Baybatyrov	TKO (punches)	AEC 14	June 7, 2025	1	0:47	Liège, Belgium	
Loss	2–2	Kallum Parker	TKO (punches)	Cage Warriors 175	July 25, 2024	1	1:15	Manchester, England	
Win	2–1	Marko Sarasjärvi	Decision (split)	Cage Warriors 167	March 15, 2024	3	5:00	Manchester, England	
Win	1–1	Kevin Simon Cesari	Submission (arm-triangle choke)	Hexagone MMA 8	August 4, 2023	1	2:13	Béziers, France	Featherweight debut.
Loss	0–1	Marlon Jones	TKO (strikes)	Full Contact Contender 32	December 17, 2022	1	N/A	Bolton, England	Bantamweight debut.

== Amateur mixed martial arts record ==
Res.	Record	Opponent	Method	Event	Date	Round	Time	Location	Notes
Win	2–0	Cesar Valencia	Submission (armbar)	ICE FC 13	16 April 2016	1	2:50	Wrexham, Wales	
Win	1–0	Stefan Cowley	Submission (guillotine choke)	Night of the Gladiators 25	20 December 2015	1	1:55	Stoke-on-Trent, England	

== Bare-knuckle boxing record ==
Professional record breakdown
1 match	1 win	0 losses
By knockout	1	0
By decision	0	0
Draws	0	

Res.	Record	Opponent	Method	Event	Date	Round	Time	Location	Notes
Win	1–0	Rick Caruso	KO (punch)	BKFC 25	6 May 2022	3	1:15	Orlando, Florida, US	Fight of the Night.

== Other media ==
Gallagher made his WWE video game debut as a playable character in WWE 2K18, and makes an appearance in both WWE 2K19 and WWE 2K20.

== 2014 sexual misconduct allegations ==
On 19 June 2020, a 2014 sexual misconduct allegation made against Claffey was made public as part of the Speaking Out movement; the victim alleged that several other women had been affected by Claffey. He was released from WWE the same day, having accepted responsibility for the incident during a dialogue with management. Claffey has not wrestled a match since. On 5 October 2020, Claffey issued a statement regarding the incident and the events which led to his release from WWE.

== Championships and accomplishments ==
- Futureshock Wrestling
  - FSW Championship (2 times)
  - FSW Trophy Tournament (2010)
  - FSW Tag Team Championship (1 time) - with Alex Cyanide
- Great Bear Promotions
  - URSA Major One Night Tournament (2015)
- Tetsujin Shoot Style
  - Tetsujin Shoot Style Tournament (2015)
- Grand Pro Wrestling
  - Gallagher's Gold Championship (1 time)
  - GPW British Championship (1 time)
- Pro Wrestling Illustrated
  - PWI ranked him No. 145 of the top 500 singles wrestlers in the PWI 500 in 2017
- Scottish Wrestling Alliance
  - Battlezone Rumble (2014)

=== Bare-knuckle boxing ===
- Bare Knuckle Fighting Championship
  - Fight of the Night (One time) vs. Rick Caruso
