= Grand Pro Wrestling =

British professional wrestling promotion

- Grand Pro Wrestling's logo
- Acronym: GPW
- Founded: Feb 2003
- Style: Professional wrestling Sports entertainment
- Headquarters: Wigan & Manchester, United Kingdom
- Founder: Lee Butler
- Owner: Johnnie Brannigan
- Formerly: Garage Pro Wrestling
- Website: GrandProWrestling.co.uk

Grand Pro Wrestling (formerly Garage Pro Wrestling) is one of the UK's most established and long running British professional wrestling promotion based in the North West of England.

The promotion was founded in February 2003 by former British wrestler "The Middleman" Lee Butler. Butler's association with the promotion ended shortly after in March 2004. Butler died in 2017 following a battle with cancer.

Since January 2005, GPW has been run by British wrestler Johnnie Brannigan.

The first event took place at the Monaco Ballroom, Hindley in July 2003. Events have been run regularly at the same venue ever since Making Grand Pro Wrestling the only wrestling promotion in the UK who have run the same venue for over 20 years.

The promotion is recognised for strong story telling and characters, building much of its own stars through its training school, whilst using a mixture of more recognised British talent and lesser-known names.

== Overview ==
The promotion runs events at The Monaco Ballroom in Hindley Wigan.

The promotion has developed a following within the independent professional wrestling scene. Its events feature ongoing storylines and character-driven narratives.

Grand Pro have established several flagship shows, such as: Crazy Cruiser-8 (one night 8-man tournament show), "Only The Strong Survive" (survival themed show) "Thunderbrawl" (a Royal Rumble themed show), "A Night To Remember" to tribute to former British wrestlers linked to the promotion who have died. Namely Dom Travis and Kris Travis. This event also features the Grand Pro Wrestling Hall of Fame. "Back with a Bang" is the promotions traditional show to start a new year.

The promotion is credited with having started and developed many of big names in the world of wrestling since 2003.

== History ==
The promotion's first show was in July 2003 and called "Defection" due to the number of wrestlers who had jumped ship from small time now-defunct promotion, NPWA. It was held at the Monaco Ballroom, Wigan. Wrestlers that night who are still active now are Johnnie "Heresy" Brannigan, "Dangerous" Damon Leigh and Joey Hayes.

In November 2003 GPW: promoted "Nemesis", It was considered a breakout show for the promotion with ground breaking production.

During a tour of Cumbria in 2004, GPW crowned their first singles champion when Chris Hero defeated JC Thunder for the then International Title (now Heavyweight Title). in March 2004, the company ran a much hyped event originally promoted by a rival company who pulled out weeks before. GPW took over and renamed it "Hostile Takeover" with a main event featuring Chris Hero v. Claudio Castagnoli (a last minute replacement for Benito "Benny" Cuntapay).

During GPW: "Last Orders At The Legion" in January 2005 there was a well documented riot involving both wrestlers and audience. The storyline became very real to the passionate fan base and occurred when Alex Shane stole the British Title from then champion Damon Leigh. Local papers featured the events as headline news.

GPW: "Saturday Night Showdown" in July 2005 JC Thunder faced El Ligero in a main event hardcore match. The match was possibly the most controversial in British wrestling history and resulted in the venue banning professional wrestling from the Greater Manchester area. However, the following year GPW were allowed to return.

April 2006, GPW promoted "A Few Good Men", the only 30 Man Rumbles in the UK at that point.

GPW promoted Europe's first ever Survivor Series dedicated show in 2007.

July 2008 was the sellout 5th-anniversary show; GPW: "V". In October 2008, GPW became the only European company to feature a Torneo cibernetico a match that has gone on to be a staple part of GPW shows and still a show that no one else in the UK has used.

In August 2010, GPW re-branded as Grand Pro Wrestling.

GPW presented its landmark 500th match in June 2011 at "Heroes & Villains". The special match was given to Zack Gibson and Jack Gallagher who fought for the British Title.

In 2012, the company entered into an inter-promotional feud with Morecambe-based promotion XWA in what many consider to be the best inter-promotional feud in British Wrestling history. GPW eventually won and XWA closed down as a result.

January 2013 saw the start of the company's 10th-year celebrations. July 2010 brought a sell-out audience to attend GPW: "X", the official 10th anniversary. The show featured a Past, Present, Future 15 Man Battle Royal. 5 names from the present roster, 5 names from the past and 5 debuting new characters. A match which typifies the promotions values.

Grand Pro Wrestling opened up their Hall of Fame in 2015. The year also saw the first ever tag team Dumpster Match.

2016 saw one of the most acclaimed British feuds of the year involving T-Bone, Bubblegum, Lana Austin, Dylan Roberts and both the British and the Heavyweight Titles, 2016 was also the first time the promotion launched their "Fast Track 4-Way" match, a match exclusive to GPW. The rules are that 4 competitors enter a 4-way rules match, the winner of the match is allowed to cash a title shot in on any of the titles but it has to be done that night.

In February 2017 the promotion announced its first ever Women's Tournament to take place throughout the year.

In July 2018 the promotion celebrated its 15th anniversary and it was on this night that Joey Hayes ended Dylan Roberts unprecedented 694 day Heavyweight Title reign.

In July 2023, the promotion celebrated its 20th anniversary.

== Championships ==
There are three championships in the promotion. The heavyweight title is regarded as the main title, the British title as the mid-level title, and a tag team trophy.

Johnnie "Heresy" Brannigan, "Dangerous" Damon Leigh, Joey Hayes, Sam Gradwell, Tyson T-Bone and Ste "Bin" Mann are the only grand slam winners, i.e. have held all three titles at different times.

In 2012, there was a fourth, now defunct title. Jack Gallagher introduced Gallagher's Gold, his own title which he eventually lost to Ste "Bin" Man in November 2012, who disposed of the title. Prior to the loss, Gallagher had successfully defended the title against Joey Hayes and in a High Stakes 4-Way Match featuring Martin Kirby, Cyanide and Dirk Feelgood.

=== GPW Heavyweight Championship ===
No.	Champion	Reign	Date	Days	Location	Event	Notes
1	Chris Hero	1	6 March 2004	228	Whitehaven	"Hold The Line Tour Pt.1"	The vacant title was contested between Hero and JC Thunder in Tables Match. The title was then known as the International Title
2	TJ Cain	1	17 October 2004	462	The Legion, Leigh	"...A Hero's Welcome"	
3	Heresy	1	22 January 2006	268	The Hague, Netherlands	"Shockwave"	The first time changed hands overseas. It was also the only time any GPW title has been contested on another promotions event. The promotion was Dutch Championship, now Dutch Professional Wrestling
4	Dirk Feelgood	1	17 October 2006	339	The Monaco Ballroom, Wigan	"Friday Night Thriller"	The title was renamed the GPW Heavyweight Title during Feelgood's reign and has only been defended in Wigan at the Rose Club, formally known as the Monaco Ballroom since
5	Darkside	1	21 September 2007	168	Wigan	"Back To School"	Unknown to the referee, Darkside actually pinned an impostor
6	Johnny Phere	1	7 March 2008	119	Wigan	"Strictly Come WRESTLING!"	Title was won in a 3-Way vs. Dirk Feelgood and Darkside
7	Bubblegum	1	4 July 2008	288	Wigan	"V"	Title was won in a 4-way vs. Johnny Phere vs. Dirk Feelgood vs. Darkside
8	Juggernaut	1	18 April 2009	461	Wigan	"Slam Jam"	Juggernaut was forced to retire following an irreparable knee injury bringing an end to a 461-day reign as champ. Juggernaut never wrestled again
9	"Dangerous" Damon Leigh	1	19 November 2010	378	Wigan	"Guts and Glory"	The vacant title was contested for in a singles match between Mark Kodiak and Damon Leigh who qualified after a mini tournament which also featured El Ligero and Dave Mastiff
10	Dirk Feelgood	2	2 December 2011	0	Wigan	"Do or Die"	The title was lost after Martin Kirby cashed in a Money in the Bank opportunity immediately after Feelgood had won. His reign lasted 60 seconds
11	Martin Kirby	1	2 December 2011	371	Wigan	"Do or Die"	
12	Cyanide	1	7 December 2012	322	Wigan	"Heroes & Villains 2"	The title was won in a Triple Threat match featuring Cyanide, Martin Kirby and Joey Hayes
13	The Cause*	1	25 October 2013	343	Wigan	"Friday Night Thriller 7"	Won following a Gauntlet Match, The Cause (a 6-person group) held the title as a group and the group was recognized as the Heavyweight Champion
14	Dirk Feelgood*	3	3 October 2014	224	Wigan	"Friday Night Thriller 8"	Title won in Six Man Elimination tag Ricky J. McKenzie, Dirk Feelgood and Johnnie Brannigan v. Dave Rayne, Sean Daniels and Axl Rage. Dave Rayne and Dirk Feelgood were the last two remaining, Feelgood pinned Rayne
15	Ricky J. McKenzie (RJM)	1	15 May 2015	0	Wigan	"Battlefield"	RJM threatened to take the belt away from Wigan and abroad after he won it. As a result, he had to defend later that night in a 6 Way vs. CJ Banks, Joey Hayes, Nate Travis, Bubblegum and Cyanide
16	Bubblegum	2	15 May 2015	203	Wigan	"Battlefield"	
17	Tyson T-Bone*	1	4 December 2015	259	Wigan	"Double Jeopardy"	Won in a special "Double Jeopardy Match" where both the Heavyweight and the British Titles were defended, first fall for the Heavyweight, second for the British. The match featured, Bubblegum, Craig Kollins and CJ Banks. Bubblegum pinned T-Bone for the British Title, T-Bone pinned Bubblegum for the Heavyweight. Bubblegum was a double champion for 9 minutes
18	Dylan Roberts	1	19 August 2016	694	Wigan	"Midsummer Madness"	At 694 days, Dylan Roberts single reign is the longest in company history.
19	Joey Hayes	1	14 July 2018	504	Wigan	"XV"	
20	Ste "Bin" Mann	1	30 Nov 2019	97	Wigan	"Guts & Glory"	
21	Joey Hayes	2	6 March 2020-Hiatus, 9 July 2023-	1+	Wigan	"Heroes & Villains"	Title was won in a Dumpster Match
22	Sam Gradwell	2	9 July 2023	456	Wigan	"XX"	Sam's reign ended on 06/10/2024 when he was forced to vacate due to sustaining a knee injury requiring surgery. It was announced the title would be contested in the Thunder Brawl Match
23	Ryan Paul Davies (RPD)	1	06 Oct 2024	364	Wigan	"Thunder Brawl "	RPD won the Vacant Title in the evening's Thunder Brawl match main event last eliminating Sandy Beach. Had RPD lost he would have been forced to retire.
24	Sandy Beach	1	05 Oct 2025	273	Wigan	"Supercharged "	
25	Isaac North	1	5th July 2026	91	Wigan	"The Great British Beatdown 2026 "	
26	Ryan Paul Davies (RPD)	2	4th October 2026	1+	Wigan	"Thunder Brawl 2026 "	RPD defeated Sam Gradwell, Sandy Beach and incumbent Isaac North in a Fatal 4 Way

- Between March 2004 and October 2006, the Heavyweight Title was defended Internationally and therefore known as the International Title. Now only competed for domestically, from 2006 it has been known as The Heavyweight Title

=== GPW British Championship ===
No.	Champion	Reign	Date	Days	Location	Event	Notes
1	"Dangerous" Damon Leigh	1	24 April 2004	287	Darwen Leisure Centre, Blackburn	"Hostile Takeover"	Won in a singles match for the vacant title v. Joey Hayes with Heresy as the special guest referee
2	Alex Shane	1	16 January 2005	383	The Legion, Leigh	"Last Orders at the Legion"	Controversial win as the ref rung for the bell before Leigh had submitted, Shane escaped in a get away car with the belt
3	"Dangerous" Damon Leigh	2	3 February 2006	379	The Monaco Ballroom, Wigan	"Back with a Bang 2006"	
4	Juggernaut	1	16 February 2007	28	Wigan	"Let Loose"	Juggernaut, managed by Alan A.A. Tasker won the title in his first ever professional wrestling match and debut in GPW
5	"Dangerous" Damon Leigh	3	16 March 2007	126	Wigan	"Hot Gossip"	
6	Joseph Hayes	1	20 July 2007	119	Wigan	"Collision Course"	Won in a 3-way v. Heresy and Damon Leigh
7	Heresy	1	16 November 2007	77	Wigan	"Supercharged"	Won in a "Winner Takes All I Quit Match", Joey Hayes' 11-year-old brother was dragged into the ring from the audience and threatened with a brick, Joey said "I Quit" to save his brother
8	"Dangerous" Damon Leigh	4	1 February 2008	63	Wigan	"Back with a Bang 2008"	
9	Jac Domitrescu	1	4 April 2008	252	Wigan	"Ballroom Blitz"	
10	"Super" Sam Bailey	1	12 December 2008	308	Wigan	"Christmas Crunch"	
11	"The Juice" CJ Banks	1	16 October 2009	399	Wigan	"Friday Night Thriller III"	The title changed hands in a 2/3 Falls Match
12	Zack Diamond	1	19 November 2010	196	Wigan	"Guts & Glory"	Won in a 4-way Scramble Match v. CJ Banks, Martin Kirby and Jack Gallagher. Gibson, at first was not even announced in the match and was a paying member of the audience. It was Gallagher, who had had his problems with Gibson prior who invited him into the match, making it a 4-way
13	Jack Gallagher	1	3 June 2011	182	Wigan	"Heroes & Villains"	
14	Ste "Bin" Man	1	2 December 2011	309	Wigan	"Do or Die"	
15	Danny Hope	1	5 October 2012	140	Wigan	"Friday Night Thriller VI"	
16	Zack Diamond	2	22 February 2013	406	Wigan	"Romance Is Dead"	Title was won in a Lumberjack Match
17	El Ligero	1	4 April 2014	441	Wigan	"Only The Strong Survive"	The title changed hands in a No DQ Match
18	Tyson T-Bone	1	19 June 2015	168	Wigan	"A Night To Remember"	
19	Bubblegum	1	4 December 2015	294	Wigan	"Double Jeopardy"	Won in a Double Jeopardy match where both the Heavyweight and British titles were defended. The match also featured Craig Kollins and CJ Banks
20	"Jumpin'" Jimmy Jackson	1	23 September 2016	343	Wigan	"Battlefield"	Jackson won the title after winning a Fast Track 4-way earlier the same night
21	Sam Gradwell	1	1 September 2017	420	Wigan	"Back To School"	With this win, Gradwell became the third Grand Slam winner in GPW history
___	Vacated	n/a	26 Oct 2018	136	Wigan	"Friday Night Thriller 11"	Johnnie Brannigan stripped Sam Gradwell of the title after he suffered a serious knee injury that will keep him out of action indefinitely.
22	Sandy Beach	1	29 March 2019	51	Wigan	"Northern Soul"	Sandy Beach defeated Dylan Roberts to fill the vacancy
23	Ashton Smith	1	18 May 2019	90	Wigan	"Only The Strong Survive"	
24	Sandy Beach	2	16 August 2019-Hiatus, 9 July 2023-	203+	Wigan	"The Great British Beatdown"	
25	Mickey Barnes	1	9 July 2023	456+	Wigan	"XX"	
26	Jack Bandicoot	1	6 Oct 2024	112+	Wigan	"Thunder Brawl"	
27	Jack Johnson	1	26 Jan 2025	252	Wigan	"Back With A Bang 2025"	Jack Johnson successfully cashed in his Fast Track opportunity immediately after Bandicoot had defended the British Title against Craig Kollins
28	Soner Dursun	1	5th Oct 2025	364	Wigan	"Supercharged"	Soner Dursun defeated incumbent Jack Johnson and Jack Bandicoot in a triple threat match
29	"Bulletproof" Brady Phillips	1	4th Oct 2026	1+	Wigan	"Thunder Brawl 2026"	

=== GPW Tag Team Trophy ===
No.	Champion	Reign	Date	Days	Location	Event	Notes
1	Project Ego (Kris Travis & Scotty Hexx)	1	18 March 2006	338	The Monaco Ballroom, Wigan	"Hold Tight"	Vacant titles were won in a 4-way Tables Match ft. Kev n Krev, Damage Control and WKD
2	WKD (Matty "D'Lyrium" Taylor & "Super" Sam Bailey)	1	16 February 2007	154	The Monaco Ballroom, Wigan	"Let Loose"	Won in a Tag Team Gauntlet Match ft. Mil-Anfield Connection and The Holmes Bros
3	Mil-Anfield Connection ("The Model" Danny Hope & Jiggy Walker)	1	20 July 2007	546	Wigan	"Collision Course"	Tag Trophy changed hands in a "Tables, Hubcaps and Chairs" match
4	The Young Offenders ("Dangerous" Damon Leigh & Joey Hayes)	1	16 January 2009	182	Wigan	"Back with a Bang"	Won in a 2/3 Falls Match
5	Paradise Lost (Heresy & Kastor LaVey)	1	17 July 2009	273	Wigan	"Heatwave"	The titles changed hands under the stipulation that the losing team must disband forever
6	The Mystics (Voodoo & The Great Suzuki)	1	16 April 2010	35	Wigan	"Jam Hot!"	
7	Paradise Lost (Heresy & Kastor LeVay)	2	21 May 2010	350	Wigan	"A Few More Good Men"	Titles were won in a No Holds Barred Match
8	Chris Echo & Ricky J Mckenzie	1	6 May 2011	273	Wigan	"Battlefield"	Ricky J. McKenzie suffered an injury during a match with The Blackpool Blondes (Axl Rage & James Drake). The Blackpool Blondes took off with the trophy, leaving RJM and Echo to have to forfeit the championship due to not being able to defend it as a team
9	The Blackpool Blondes (Axl Rage & James Drake)	1	2 March 2012	275	Wigan	"Back with a Bang"	The Blackpool Blondes were awarded the trophy after previous holders, Echo & RJM could no longer defend the trophy as a team
10	The Killers (Mark Kodiak & Johnnie 'Heresy' Brannigan (3))	1	2 November 2012	260	Wigan	"Fireworks"	
11	The Island Brothers (Tabu & Rio)	1	26 July 2013	483	Wigan	"X"	Titles were won in a No Holds Barred Match
12	The Midnight Bin Collection (Jet Fashion & Ste "Bin" Man)	1	21 November 2014	175	Wigan	"Final Fight"	
13	The Bad Lads (Drill & Mickey Barnes)	1	15 May 2015	40	Wigan	"Battlefield"	
14	The Midnight Bin Collection (Ste "Bin" Man & Jet Fashion)	2	24 July 2015	217	Wigan	"Cruel Summer"	Titles changed hands in a first ever "Dumpster Match"
15	The Hate League (Danxig & Soner Dursun)*	1	26 February 2016	350	Wigan	"Bad Blood"	
16	The Island Bros (Rio & Tabu)	2	10 February 2017	91	Wigan	"Back with a Bang"	
17	The Bad Lads (Big Joe, Drill & Mickey Barnes)*	2	12 May 2017	287	Wigan	"A Night To Remember"	Big Joe cashed in his Fast Track opportunity after Kollins & T-Bone assaulted the previous champions, The Island Bros. All three men were recognised as the title holders
18	Ashton Smith & Martin Kirby	1	23 February 2018	98	Wigan	"Northern Soul"	
19	Craig Kollins & Tyson T-Bone	1	1 June 2018	105	Wigan	"A Night To Remember"	With this victory, Tyson T-Bone has completed the Grand Pro Grand Slam
20	The Austins (LA Austin & Lana Austin)	1	14 September 2018-Hiatus, 9 July 2023-	1197	Wigan	"Thunder Brawl"	Lana Austin makes history as the first female to hold the Tag Team Trophy.
21	Feelgood Media Limited (Chase Alcala & Melanie Price)	1	27 April 2025 – 1 February 2026	280	Wigan	"Northern Soul"	The incredible record setting title reign of the Austin's came to an end in a highly controversial No DQ Match. Rob Drake substituted for LA Austin mid match due to injury. There was also interference from Martin Kirby, Dylan Roberts, Dirk Feelgood and Isaiah Quinn.
22	Thel-Mel (Tom Thelwell & Melissa Fierce)	1	1 February 2026 – Present	245+	Wigan	"Back With A Bang"	Thel-Mel defeated FML in a 3 on 2 Handicap Match by pinning Martin Kirby who Dirk Feelgood had negotiated to be in the match.

== Hall of fame ==
Without Brannigan's knowledge, on 19 June 2015, after 12 years of business, roster members organised for Grand Pro Wrestling to opened its doors to a hall of fame. Welcoming owner Brannigan as its first inductee.

Other inductees have included: Bubblegum, Damon Leigh, Tony Knox, Martin Kirby, Joey Hayes.

== Crazy Cruiser-8 tournament ==
The Crazy Cruiser-8 is an eight-man one night tournament, and one of the shows GPW has become synonymous with. The eight entrants into the tournament are cruiserweights. Heavyweights are not permitted entry into the tournament. Qualifying matches are contested months prior to the tournament either in traditional one on one matches, 4-ways, 3-ways or in a "Last Chance Saloon battle royal". Byes passed the preliminaries have been given in the past to established foreign entrants, eligible reigning Champions and "the fans choice".

The eventual winner of the tournament would have not only been successful in the preliminaries, but have won three times in a row on the night of the tournament itself. The winner does not defend their title the following year.

=== 2006 ===
The first CC-8 tournament was 3 November 2006 and the final eight men were:

- Kris Travis
- El Ligero
- Joseph Hayes
- Emil Sitoci
- Darkside
- Bubblegum
- "The Model" Danny Hope
- "Juice" CJ Banks

The eventual winner was Bubblegum after he defeated Joseph Hayes in the final.

=== 2008 ===
The second Crazy Cruiser tournament was known as CC-08 and competed on 2 May 2008. The final eight men were:

- Jack Toxic
- El Ligero
- "The Model" Danny Hope
- Jiggy Walker
- "Juice" CJ Banks
- "Super" Sam Bailey
- Chris Echo
- Voodoo

CJ Banks was the eventual winner after defeating Chris Echo in the final.

=== 2009 ===
The third Crazy Cruiser tournament was competed on 13 November 2009 and saw new rules on qualifying. 2 top seeds were selected as automatic qualifiers (Joey Hayes & Bubblegum). Other qualifiers were decided through a first ever Fan's Choice, a 4-Way Qualifier, The Last Chance Battle Royal and the return of the International Entrant. The final eight men were:

- Max Damon
- Joey Hayes
- Fox Carter
- The Juice
- Bubblegum
- Martin Kirby
- Ricky J. McKenzie
- Dylan Roberts

Joey Hayes was the eventual winner after defeating CC8 2008 Champion, Juice in the final.

=== 2013 ===
The fourth Crazy Cruiser tournament was competed on 29 November 2013. The final eight men were:

- El Ligero
- Joey Hayes
- Jack Gallagher
- Kris Travis
- Bubblegum
- Zack Gibson
- Jim Nastic
- Dylan Roberts

El Ligero was the eventual winner after defeating Zack Gibson in the final.

=== 2018 ===
The fifth Crazy Cruiser tournament was competed on 30 November 2018. The final eight participants were:

- CJ Banks
- Jack Griffith
- Lana Austin
- LA Austin
- Soner Dursun
- Isaiah Quinn
- Sandy Beach
- Jet Fashion

Sandy Beach was the eventual winner after defeating Lana Austin in the final.

== North West Rookie League ==
GPW have championed their trainees and in 2011, they launched the North West Rookie League that would give a stage to perform on for eight new characters from not just their own school, but nearby schools as well.

The NWRL was very well received, and in 2015, they ran it again in a different format. Historically, the winners of the league have received a shot at the British title.

=== 2011 ===
In 2011, Grand Pro Wrestling introduced the first ever North West Rookie League. The first League featured two teams, one captained by Axl Rage and one captained by The Great Suzuki. Each month, the two teams would square off and the loser in each match would be eliminated. The Great Suzuki's team triumphed in the final when Ste "Bin" Mann, (the sole survivor on Team Suzuki) defeated Jason Logan, (the sole survivor on Team Rage) at GPW "Night of the Brave" in November 2011.

Team Suzuki

- Action Jackson
- Jynx
- LA Austin
- Ste "Bin" Man (Winner)

Team Rage

- JD Sassoon
- Ken Zen
- Skull Crusher
- Jason Logan (Runner-up)

=== 2015 ===
In 2015, GPW reintroduced the North West Rookie League with a revised format. This time, instead of two teams of 4, GPW Pro's would team with GPW Rookies in a points based tournament. Below are the current standings as of 24 July 2015.

On 18 September 2015 at GPW "Back To School", Dylan Roberts and Danxig defeated The Circus via pinfall. As a result of their victory, Danxig was declared winner of the North West Rookie League 2015. Earlier in the night, Alex Jones-Casey defeated Matthew Brooks and Jimmy Jackson to finish in third place.

2015 Rookie League final standings

Winner: Danxig

Second Place: Nicholas Cartier

Third Place: Alex Jones-Casey

== GPW training school ==
Established when the promotion first started in 2003, the training school has produced some of the best wrestlers on the circuit past and present. Most noteworthy WWE competitor Sam Gradwell (Ricky J. McKenzie). Other names include: Joey Hayes, Damon Leigh, Danny Hope, CJ Banks, Matthew Brooks, The Island Brothers, Joe Blazr, Mickey Barnes, RPD, Lana Austin, Dylan Roberts and many more.

The school was run by head trainer Johnnie "Heresy" Brannigan from 2006 until its closure in 2020.

== See also ==
- Professional wrestling in the United Kingdom
- List of professional wrestling promotions in the United Kingdom
