= Matt Myers (wrestler) =

British professional wrestler (born 1991)

Personal information
- Born: Matthew James Butler; 16 June 1991 (age 35) Hull, East Riding of Yorkshire, England

Professional wrestling career
- Ring name: Matt Myers
- Billed height: 6 ft 1 in (185 cm)
- Billed weight: 183 lb (83 kg)
- Billed from: Hull; Awesome Town
- Trained by: El Ligero; Dave Rayne; Steve Sykes
- Debut: 2006

Matthew James Butler (born 16 June 1991) is a British professional wrestler. He currently works for New Generation Wrestling where he performs under the name 'The Amazing' Matt Myers. He also performs for a number of other British professional wrestling promotions.

== Professional wrestling career ==
=== Various British promotions (2006–present) ===
After making his professional debut aged fifteen, Myers worked for a number of independent promotions including XWCA, Real Deal Wrestling, Dynamic Pro Wrestling and All Star Wrestling. While competing in RDW, he engaged in a feud with Colossus and Nathan Cruz over possession of the RDW Tag Team Championships. Following his debut for XWCA in 2012, Myers has reignited his feuds with Dave Breaks and Dara Diablo which began in NGW. In 2013 he began competing for Tidal Championship Wrestling, where he feuded with then champion Liam Lazarus. 2014 saw Myers debut for House Of Pain: Evolution. His first feud saw him fend off the bullying tactics of Barricade, who eventually left Myers alone after turning face as part of a different angle. Myers then teamed with Danny Chase to form Battle Squad: Amazing, who defeated former WWF Tag Team Champions Too Cool in their debut match.

=== New Generation Wrestling (2008–present) ===
Myers appeared on the first ever NGW show in 2008, before taking part in the tournament to crown its inaugural champion, losing in the quarter-finals to eventual winner Alex Cyanide. In 2009, he began a longstanding series of matches against close friend Nathan Cruz, with the two exchanging victories before Myers engaged in a feud with Dave Breaks which lasted much of 2010, ending in a two out of three falls match at the Second Anniversary Show, which Myers won. A series of victories against El Ligero, CJ Banks and Colossus paved the way for Myers to face Nathan Cruz, now a heel at Eternal Glory 2011. Myers defeated Cruz to capture the championship, successfully defending it in their rematch a month later. Myers lost the title to Rampage Brown at Destiny 2012 after losing consciousness during their match before tapping out or being pinned. He went on to lose his rematch to Rampage at Full Force 2012. Myers competed in a variety of one off matches throughout the first half of 2013, before challenging a repentant and down on his luck Nathan Cruz to a match at the Fifth Anniversary Show, offering Cruz the opportunity at redemption following his failed Cruz Enterprises. Their match at the Fifth Anniversary Show ended in a no contest when they were attacked by debuting faction The Control. In 2014 Myers became involved in the Control war angle, defeating Sam Wilder and losing to Mark Haskins at the Sixth Anniversary Show, then teaming with Nathan Cruz for consecutive victories against the Proven at Eternal Glory 2014 and Full Force 2015. At Destiny 2015 he won the Destiny rumble by last eliminating Marty Scurll to be named the number one contender to Rampage Brown's Undisputed NGW Championship, a title he had lost to Rampage at the same event three years previously. During their match at the Seventh Anniversary Show, Myers was in a winning position against Brown when he was hit with the belt by Dara Diablo, costing him the match and the championship. Myers went on to face Diablo at Ultimate Showdown, winning by disqualification. A second match at A New Dawn, contested under hair vs hair rules was won by Diablo, who despite his victory chose to shave his own head instead of Myers. At Collision Course, Myers was involved in a triple threat GenX League qualifier with Robbie X and Ashton Smith, which ended in a ten-minute time limit draw. On the same night, Matt Myers was announced as the winner of a fan poll to name the number one contender to Nathan Cruz's Undisputed NGW Championship at Eternal Glory 2015.

== Personal life ==
Myers developed an interest in professional wrestling at a young age, influenced in part by his grandparents, who were fans of the sport. He and his longtime friend Nathan Cruz organized informal wrestling activities during their youth, creating makeshift rings and performing shows for friends using original characters and storylines.

Matt Myers is considered responsible for the starting point of the eventual success of Professional Wrestling in Hull as it was his actions that got the very first Professional Wrestling School to be set-up in the city after convincing The Urban Warrior (Ron Wilkinson – PWA) to open up an Academy to give himself & Nathan Cruz the training they needed to get out of the back garden and into the ring.

After almost two years of training and a handful of matches under his belt, Matt eventually saw through the facade of The Urban Warrior and how inexperienced of a trainer he was. Upon seeing this, Matt Myers left the school and he and friend Luke Ingamells (whom he had met at the PWA school) decided to open a school themselves and bring in a more experienced trainer in Dave Rayne to teach them and Nathan Cruz among others.

What first was intended to be just a school – both him & Luke Ingamells decided to give promoting a shot where Myers came up with the name New Generation Wrestling, a name which has stuck with the company for almost eight years including the transition of ownership to Rich Dunn in 2011.

Matt has a degree in Television & Film Design after graduating from the Hull School of Art & Design in 2014. However, after losing much passion for the subject throughout the course & after, Matt now works full-time in social-care within a drug & alcohol agency tailored for those within the Criminal Justice System.

Matt also regularly assists head trainers El Ligero and Nathan Cruz at the NGW Academy.

== Championships and accomplishments ==
- British Wrestling Revolution
  - BWR Tag Team Championship (2 times) - with Nathan Cruz
- New Generation Wrestling
  - NGW Championship (3 times)
  - NGW GenX Championship (1 time)
  - NGW Tag Team Championship (1 time) - with Robbie X
  - NGW Destiny Rumble Winner (2015)
