= Mark Haskins =

British professional wrestler

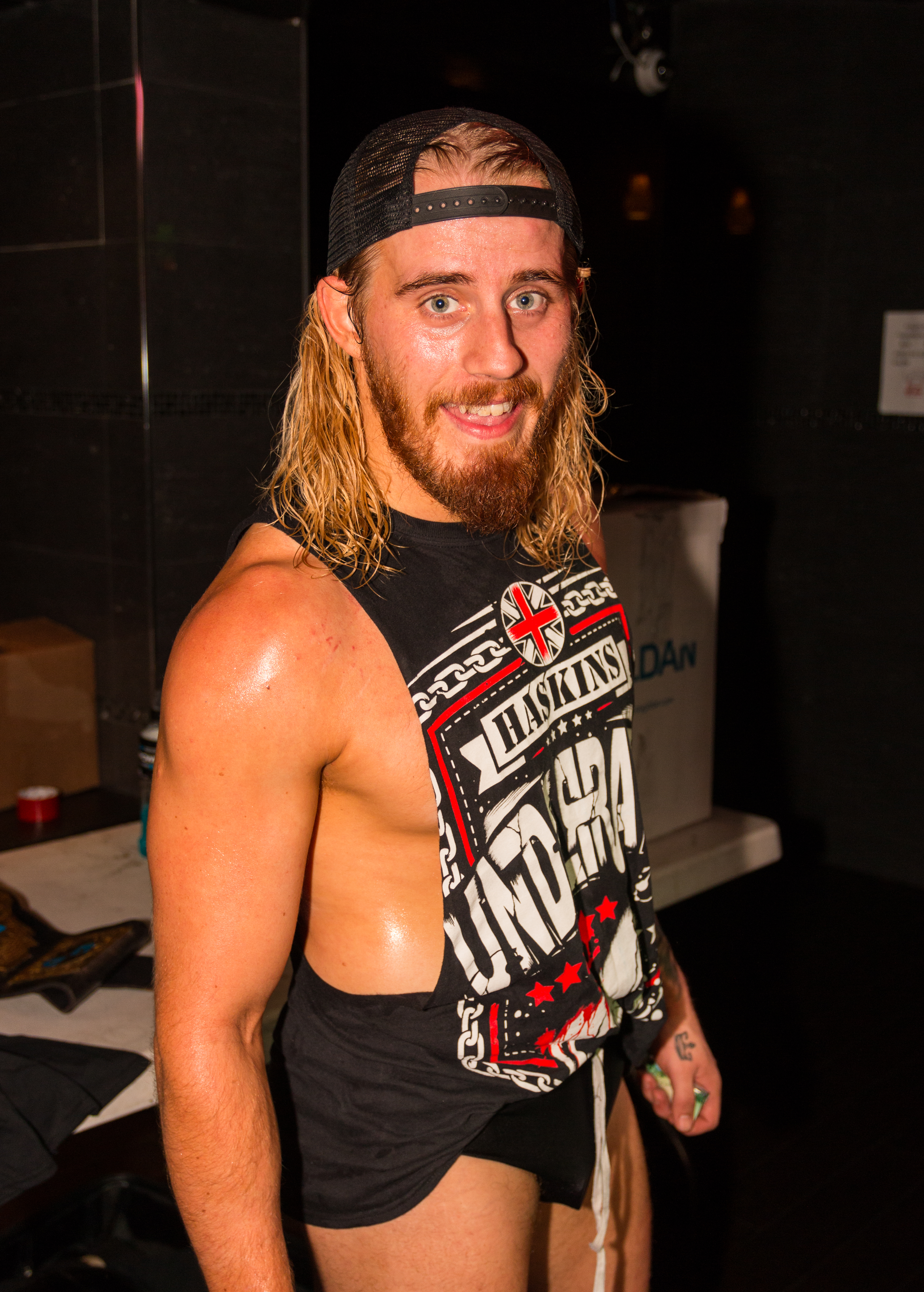
- Haskins in 2016

Personal information
- Born: 25 June 1988 (age 38) Faringdon, Oxfordshire, England
- Spouse: Vicky Skeeles 2013 - 2026
- Children: 2

Professional wrestling career
- Ring name(s): Mark Haskins; Skins the Chav
- Billed height: 5 ft 10 in (1.78 m)
- Billed weight: 209 lb (95 kg)
- Billed from: Faringdon, Oxfordshire
- Trained by: Mark Sloan
- Debut: July 2006

Mark Haskins (born June 25, 1988), is an English professional wrestler, currently performs on the British independent scene. He is known internationally for his time in Total Nonstop Action Wrestling, as well as his appearances in Ring of Honor, Progress Wrestling, Revolution Pro Wrestling, Dragon Gate, Pro Wrestling Guerrilla, and International Pro Wrestling: United Kingdom.

== Professional wrestling career ==
=== Early career ===
Haskins debuted on July 22, 2006, for FWA Academy by teaming up with Tom Langford to defeat Mark Sloan and Ollie Burns. He was involved in his first cage match just days after his debut, losing to Mark Sloan and Ollie Burns. He debuted for Premier Promotions on September 7, 2006. Haskins would go on to wrestle many matches for Premier Promotions over the years, mostly British Rules matches. He was part of the FWA Academy Championship Number One Contendership tournament and got to the semi-finals before being eliminated by Max Voltage. His last match for FWA Academy came at the beginning of 2007 by teaming with Tommy Langford and defeating Doug Williams and Jake McCluskey.

Haskins debuted for International Pro Wrestling: United Kingdom on April 1, 2007, with Dan James, Harry Mills, & Tommy Langford defeating Ian Logan, Jake McCluskey, Jamie Brum, and Wade Fitzgerald. He would then team up with The Chavs (Dan James and Harry Mills) in a losing effort on April 4, 2007. Haskins and Mills participated in a One Pro Wrestling six-team gauntlet match for the 1PW Tag Team Championship and also lost to BritRage in a match for the 4FW Tag Team Championship. In August, he debuted for Joint Promotions and real-quality wrestling. He participated in a British National Championship Tournament and got to the quarterfinals before being beaten by Terry Fraizer. For one night on January 13, 2008, he changed his name to Skins and lost to El Ligero. Haskins teamed with The Saint to take on BritRage for the 4FW Tag Team Championship in February and lost. Haskins won an IPW:UK Championship #1 Contendership Battle Royal only to lose to the champion Martin Stone. In March, he lost a 28-man Royal Rumble at IPW:UK. Haskins and Bison Smith lost to Kotaro Suzuki and Mitsuharu Misawa at A-Merchandise's Noah vs. UK event. Upon making his debut for Irish Whip Wrestling on December 6, 2008, he beat Red Vinny, The Ballymun Bruiser and Vic Viper for the RQW Cruiserweight Championship. At the beginning of 2009, he lost a 4FW Heavyweight Championship Number One Contendership five-way ladder match. On February 28, 2009, he lost the Extreme Measures 2009 Tournament, and at Premier Promotion, he lost in the finals of a one-night tournament. On April 6, 2009, Haskins and Mark Sloan won the PWF Tag Team Championship Tournament for the vacant PWF Tag Team Championship by defeating Roy Knight and Zak Zodiac. He lost the RQW Cruiserweight Championship to the British Eagle only to win it back days later. Haskins lost a three-way match for the wXW World Lightweight Championship on July 4, 2009. He also won the 2009 Ian Dowland Trophy. On his return to Europe from Dragon Gate, he performed at the British Allstar Wrestling Alliance, losing to Team H8 (Gideon and Jeckel). At All-Star Wrestling, he lost to Mikey Whiplash for the World Mid-Heavyweight Championship. In the 2011 16 Carat Gold Tournament, Haskins advanced to the quarterfinals before being eliminated by Big Van Walter.

==== The Thrillers (2007–2009) ====
Haskins formed a team with Joel Redman known as The Thrillers; on their debut match together, they lost to The South Coast Rock 'n' Roll Express (Ian Logan and Jake McCluskey) on July 14, 2007, which involved a special guest referee. The team would go on a losing streak for the next few months and even lost to The Kartel (Sha Samuels and Terry Frazier) in a match for the IPW:UK Tag Team Championship. The Thrillers won their first match as a tag team in a dark match by defeating JP Monroe and Jules Lambrini on January 27 January 2008.

The team debuted for Real Quality Wrestling on February 16, 2008, and defeated the Maximum Head (Dan Head & Max Voltage) and would next month beat The Lost Boys (Danny Darko and Jo FX). After their two successful matches, they challenged The Damned Nation (Cameron Kraze and Dragon Aisu) on April 26, 2008, for the RQW Tag Team Championship which they won.

The Thrillers returned to IPW:UK on May 4, 2008, triumphant with tag team gold in the form of the RQW Tag Team Championship, only to lose the championship to The Kartel (Sha Samuels & Terry Frazier) in a championship unification match that also involved the IPW:UK Tag Team Championship. The team debuted for One Pro Wrestling losing to BritRage (Mark Sloan & Wade Fitzgerald). However, they would beat The Kartel on September 28, 2008, for the Unified British Tag Team Championship. The Thrillers would then debut for Westside Xtreme Wrestling at the beginning of 2009 and win a wXw Tag Team Championship contendership match defeating Adam Polak and Lazio Fe. With that win, they challenged Doug Williams and Martin Stone for the wXw Tag Team Championship the following month, but were unable to win the title.

Upon their return to IPW:UK, The Thrillers lost the Unified British Tag Team Championship to The Leaders of The New School (Marty Scurll and Zack Sabre Jr.). The Thrillers tried to regain the championship on two separate occasions, the first ending in DQ and the second where they were defeated cleanly in a tables, ladder and chairs match.

=== Dragon Gate (2009–2011, 2013, 2014) ===
Haskins debuted for Dragongate on October 31, 2009, during their European tour stop in Germany, teaming with Tommy End in a losing effort against The Young Bucks. A day later, in the UK, Haskins defeated Kagetora. Haskins joined Dragon Gate in February 2010 for a two-month tour, making his Japanese debut on February 6 and losing to Don Fujii. The Haskins tour finished on March 22, teaming with Akira Tozawa and Kagetora and losing to Makoto Hashi, Naoki Tanizaki and Pac at the Ryōgoku Kokugikan. Haskins returned to Dragon Gate in May for another two-month tour, finishing up on July 11 at Dragon Gate's biggest show of the year, the Kobe Pro-Wrestling Festival. In August, Haskins teamed up with Pac to take part in the Summer Adventure Tag League, finishing the tournament with one win and four losses. On September 6, Haskins lost to Pac in his final Dragon Gate match in Japan. Haskins has further competed in Dragon Gate as part of their European and UK tours in 2010, 2011, 2013 and 2014.

=== Total Nonstop Action Wrestling (2011–2012) ===
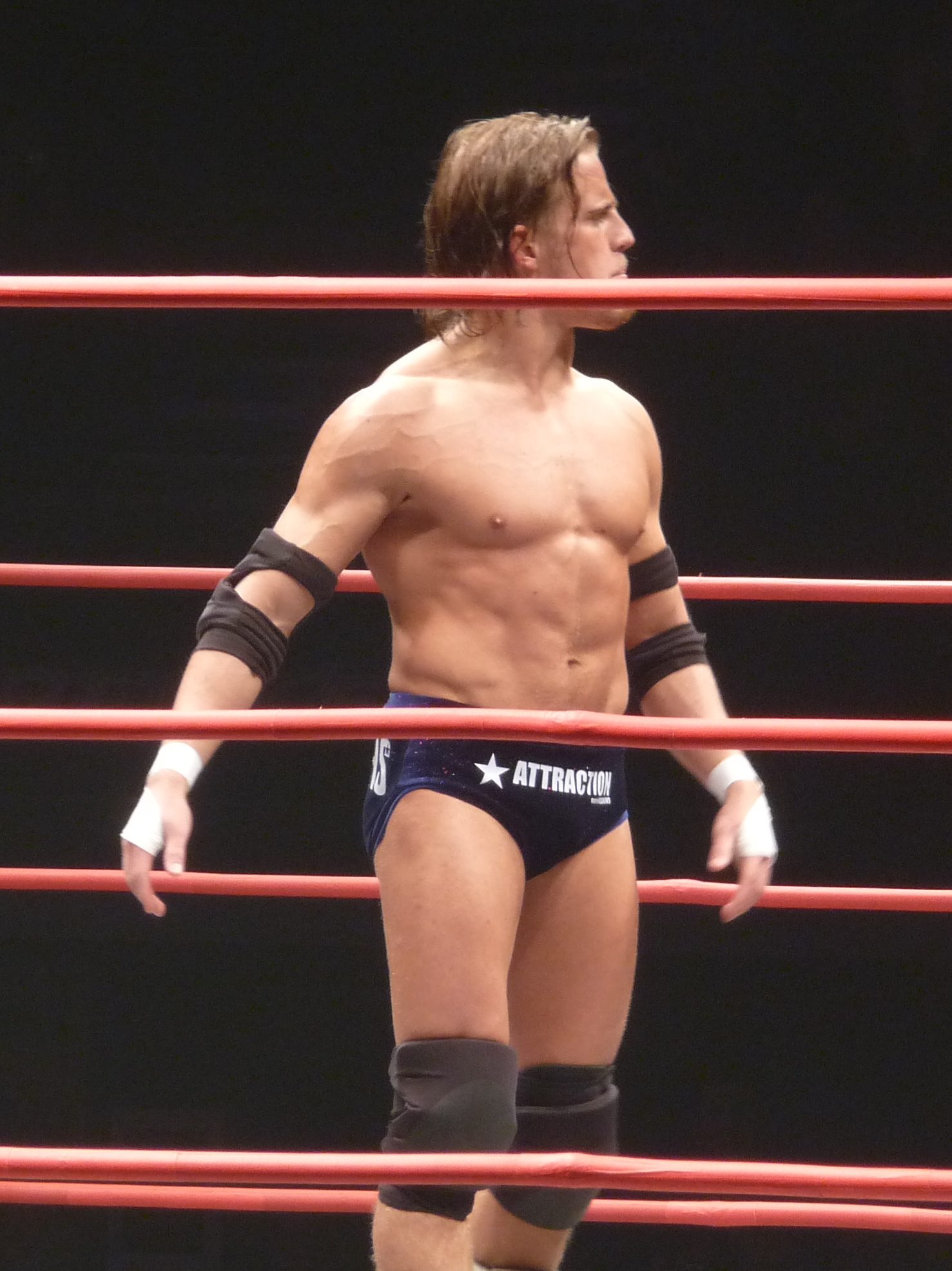
Haskins in the ring during TNA's European tour in January 2011

Haskins wrestled on TNA's European Tour in January 2011. He made another appearance with TNA on July 10 at Destination X, where he was defeated by compatriot Douglas Williams. Haskins made his return to TNA on the August 11, 2011 edition of Impact Wrestling, appearing in a backstage segment where Eric Bischoff introduced new rules to the X Division. On August 18, 2011, TNA announced that Haskins had signed a contract with the promotion. On that evening's episode of Impact Wrestling, he took part in a gauntlet match to determine the X Division rankings. After eliminating Alex Shelley and Robbie E from the match, Haskins was himself eliminated by Zema Ion, placing him sixth in the rankings. Haskins returned to Impact Wrestling on February 2, 2012, losing to X Division Champion Austin Aries in a match taped in London. During the match, Haskins suffered a concussion and a neck injury, rendering him inactive for several months. After several months of inactivity, on September 14, 2012, it was reported that Haskins had parted ways with TNA, after the promotion opted not to renew his contract.

=== Return to British independent circuit (2012–present) ===
Although signed to TNA, Haskins continued to perform for British independent promotions. He made his return to the British independent circuit on February 4, 2012, at All Star Wrestling where he lost to Dean Allmark and the next day lost to him again in the semi-final of a one-night tournament. Haskins would appear frequently for International Pro Wrestling: United Kingdom, New Generation Wrestling and Southside Wrestling Entertainment. At Preston City Wrestling's Blood, Sweat, and Beers, Haskins lost to T-Bone in a match for the PCW Championship, which also included Johnny Moss. The Thrillers would reunite at IPW:UK No Escape 2012 and lost to Project Ego (Kris Travis and Martin Kirby).

At NGW Destiny 2012, Haskins took part in a NGW Heavyweight Championship number one contendership 30 Man Royal Rumble. At SWE Speed King, Haskins lost to Ego Dragon in the semi-final of the SWE Speed King Championship Tournament and, a month later, took on Marty Scurll for the same championship. At IPW:UK Extreme Measures 2012, Haskins lost to Akira Tozawa in the semi-final of the Extreme Measures 2012 Tournament. At SWE Supremacy, Haskins lost to Stixx in a match to decide the SWE Heavyweight Champion. Two days later, he would lose to Prince Devitt in a fatal four-way fight for the IPW:UK British Cruiserweight Championship, which also included El Ligero and Noam Dar. On January 19, 2013, Haskins lost to Zack Sabre Jr. in a qualifying match for the 16-carat gold tournament. When Dragon Gate returned to tour the UK, he wrestled at all three events, where he developed a small feud with Marty Scurll, which, on February 24, 2013, culminated with Scurll going over Haskins. On March 16, 2013, at Eastmount Recreation Centre in Hull, Haskins defeated 29 other men to become the new New Generation Wrestling Champion. On May 18, 2013, he went on to successfully defend the title against Kris Travis at Victoria Hall, Keighley (just outside Bradford). In June 2013, Mark defeated Jimmy Jacobs in the main event, and in August 2013, Mark defeated Sabu in a main event hardcore match, both for Wu-Tech Wrestling, which was based in Worcester, England, and the match happened at the Rainbow Hill Club, in Worcester.

On February 11, 2013, Haskins won a six-man match to be crowned the Premier British Wrestling "King of Cruisers" 2013, winning over Noam Dar, Kenny Williams, Joey Hayes, El Ligero and CJ Banks.

Mark Haskins has been a regular at Southside Wrestling Entertainment since August 2012 and won the heavyweight title on October 27, 2013. He subsequently defended the title against Uhaa Nation and made a second defence against former WWE star Trent Barreta on March 9 March 2014.

In 2017, Haskins was part of the ROH War of the Worlds UK defeating Silas Young on night 2 but losing to Hiromu Takahashi on night 3. In August he wrestled against Shane Strickland for the CZW World Heavyweight Championship in a losing effort.

On December 4, 2017, Haskins debuted for Defiant Wrestling at #WeAreDefiant as a heel, attacking Martin Kirby with Chris Ridgeway. Austin Aries ran down to seemingly save Kirby; however, he attacked Kirby instead and aligned himself with Haskins and Ridgeway. On the 29 December episode of Defiant, Haskins, alongside Ridgeway, Aries and other members of the IPW:UK roster, attacked the ring crew, Jimmy Havoc, Primate, BT Gunn, and Joe Coffey, and also attacked the commentator team, choking Dave Bradshaw, knocking out James R. Kennedy, and destroying the ring. On March 26 March 2017, Haskins and Jimmy Havoc defeated Aussie Open (Kyle Fletcher and Mark Davis) and BT Gunn & Joe Coffey to win the Defiant Tag Team Championships.

=== Progress Wrestling (2013–present) ===
Haskins first competed in Progress Wrestling at Chapter Seven and quickly made a name for himself in the promotion as part of the hated Screw Indy Wrestling stable alongside Nathan Cruz, Rampage Brown, Sha Samuels and Martin Stone. Haskins and Cruz made several attempts to become Progress Tag Team Champions, but were ultimately unsuccessful in every attempt. In singles action, Haskins faced Ricochet and Zack Sabre Jr. in a three-way match at Chapter Nine. Once Rampage Brown left the group, he and Haskins became involved in a heated rivalry that culminated in a no-disqualification match at Chapter Eighteen which Brown won.

Following a two-month absence due to injury, Haskins evolved into a fan favourite, exhibiting an MMA striking and submission-oriented wrestling style. He entered the inaugural Super Strong Style 16 tournament in 2015, beating Jack Gallagher in the opening round before losing to tournament winner Will Ospreay in the quarterfinals. He won the 2015 Thunderbastard match, but was unsuccessful in his subsequent attempt to win the Progress Championship from Ospreay at Chapter Twenty-One.

In the 2016 Super Strong Style 16 tournament, he beat Pete Dunne in the first round but did not compete further due to exhaustion and illness. He returned to Progress at Chapter Thirty-Two, answering Johnny Gargano's open challenge for his Smash Wrestling Championship. Haskins won the match and the title, becoming the first British wrestler to hold that belt. At Chapter Thirty-Three, Haskins won a number-one contenders match against Ospreay and announced that he would face the Progress Champion in September at Chapter Thirty-Six, Progress' biggest ever show. At the Brixton show, Haskins pinned Marty Scurll in the main event triple-threat match, also involving Tommy End, to become Progress Champion for the first time. Haskins successfully defended his title against Zack Gibson at Chapter 37 and against both Marty Scurll and Jimmy Havoc at Chapter 38. After the latter victory, Haskins was forced to give up the championship due to injury.

In January 2017, Haskins made his return to Progress at Chapter Forty-Three, joining with the returning Flash Morgan Webster to save Jimmy Havoc from Dunne and Trent Seven, revealing that both he and Webster were medically cleared to compete again. In March 2017, Haskins went on to face Progress Champion Pete Dunne for the title at Progress Orlando. He and Mark Andrews fought to a draw for the number one contendership at Chapter Forty-Seven, and both lost to Dunne at Chapter Forty-Eight in the three-way match for the championship. Haskins entered the 2017 Super Strong Style 16 Tournament, winning against Flash Morgan Webster in the first round before losing to Tyler Bate in the quarter-finals.

Haskins then became embroiled in a feud with Jimmy Havoc, both men determined to regain the Progress World Championship. Initially forming a tag team, the pair were defeated by the Origin (Zack Gibson and Nathan Cruz) at Chapter Fifty and by British Strong Style (Trent Seven and Tyler Bate) in a match for the Progress Tag Team Championship at Chapter Fifty-Three. During this match, Haskins' wife Vicky was grabbed by Pete Dunne as a distraction, which led to Haskins and Havoc's defeat and caused Haskins and Havoc to brawl after the match. This led to a death Match between the two at Chapter Fifty-Five, held at Alexandra Palace, where Havoc was victorious.

At Chapter Fifty-Six, Haskins turned heel and, alongside Havoc, attacked David Starr and Jack Sexsmith with a spiked bat. Now accompanied by Vicky Haskins, Haskins and Havoc have been undefeated as a team since Chapter Fifty Seven. At Chapter 63, Haskins and Havoc defeated Grizzled Young Veterans to win the Progress Tag Team Championships. They lost the title back to Grizzled Young Veterans in Chapter 64. At Chapter 76: Hello Wembley!, Haskins defeated Matt Riddle in Riddle's farewell match on the independent scene. At Chapter 77, Haskins defeated Chris Brookes and Jimmy Havoc to become the number one contender for the Progress World Championship. He would get his opportunity at Chapter 78, where he unsuccessfully challenge Walter.

=== Smash Wrestling (2016–2018) ===
Haskins won the Smash Wrestling Championship at a Progress Wrestling show in June 2016, successfully answering champion Johnny Gargano's open challenge for the title. It was the first time the belt changed hands on British soil and Haskins is the first ever British Smash Wrestling Champion.

He went on to successfully defend the title against Tarik in August 2016, his first appearance for Smash in the company's home country. During the three Progress vs. Smash shows in September 2016, Haskins successfully defended the belt against Smash Wrestling regulars Maybach Beta, Brent Banks, and Mike Bailey. Due to injury, Haskins had to relinquish the Smash Wrestling Championship later that year. He made his return to the company in June 2017, winning the Gold 2017 Tournament by beating Dalton Castle in the opening round and then defeating Evil Uno, Kevin Bennett, Tarik and Sebastian Suave in the tournament final. On August 13 August Haskins failed to regain the Smash Wrestling Championship against Tyson Dux.

=== Pro Wrestling Guerrilla (2016–2017) ===
On June 27, 2016, it was announced that Haskins would debut for Pro Wrestling Guerrilla by taking part in the 2016 Battle of Los Angeles in September 2016. At the event, Haskins beat Cedric Alexander in the first round and Kyle O'Reilly in the quarterfinals before being defeated by eventual tournament winner Marty Scurll in the semi-finals. Haskins made his return to PWG in May 2017, when he lost to Lio Rush. In September 2017, Haskins entered to the Battle Of Los Angeles, losing in the first round against Travis Banks. Haskins competed at All Star Weekend 13, defeating Adam Brooks during Night 1 but losing to the Young Bucks alongside Morgan Webster on Night 2.

=== Insane Championship Wrestling (2018, 2022) ===
Haskins debuted for Insane Championship Wrestling on ICW Fight Club in an unsuccessful challenge for BT Gunn's ICW World Heavyweight Championship. For the remainder of 2018, Haskins would align with Jimmy Havoc and Viper in tag team competition and make his Fear & Loathing debut at the SECC Hydro on 2 December 2018 in a Six Way Tables, ladders, and chairs match for an ICW Tag Team Championship opportunity.

Haskins returned to ICW in 2022, scoring wins over Andy Wild, Theo Doros, and Stevie James while losing another ICW World Heavyweight Championship match to Kez Evans at The 10th Annual Square Go! event.

=== Ring of Honor (2018–2021) ===
Haskins made his Ring of Honor debut in May 2018, working during the Honor United tour. On August, ROH came back to UK with their 3-day tour Honor Re-United, where Haskins won the International Cup. On the third day, Haskins challenged ROH World Champion Jay Lethal, but he was defeated. On 20 December 2018, Haskins announced he signed a contract with Ring of Honor. On 12 January 2019, Lifeblood's Juice Robinson, Mark Haskins, Bandido, David Finlay and Tracy Williams defeated Jay Lethal, Jeff Cobb, Jonathan Gresham, Dalton Castle and Flip Gordon when Castle was forced to submit by Haskins. The two sides faced off before shaking hands. At the 2019 Tag Wars tournament, Lifeblood's Mark Haskins and Tracy Williams were defeated by Jay Lethal & Jonathan Gresham in the first round. At G1 Supercard, Haskins along with Juice Robinson & Flip Gordon defeated Bully Ray, Shane Taylor & Silas Young in a New York City street fight match. During the night 3 of the War of the Worlds, Haskins unsuccessfully challenged Matt Taven for the ROH World Championship. Since then Lifeblood started a feud against Villain Enterprises. At Best In The Word, Lifeblood's Haskins and Williams along with P. J. Black were defeated by Villain Enterprises for the ROH World Six Man Tag Team Championship, after the match they tried to recruit Flip Gordon to the stable, however he turned on them and joined Villain Enterprises. On 29 June, Lifeblood defeated Villain Enterprises in a Street Fight match. At Honor For All, Lifeblood's Haskins and Bandido defeated Villain Enterprises thus earning an opportunity for the ROH World Tag Team Championship. At Death Before Dishonor XVII, they were defeated by the defending champions The Briscoe Brothers. At the end of the year, Haskins started a feud with Bully Ray which culminated at Final Battle, where Haskins defeated Bully Ray in a Street Fight match.

== Championships and accomplishments ==
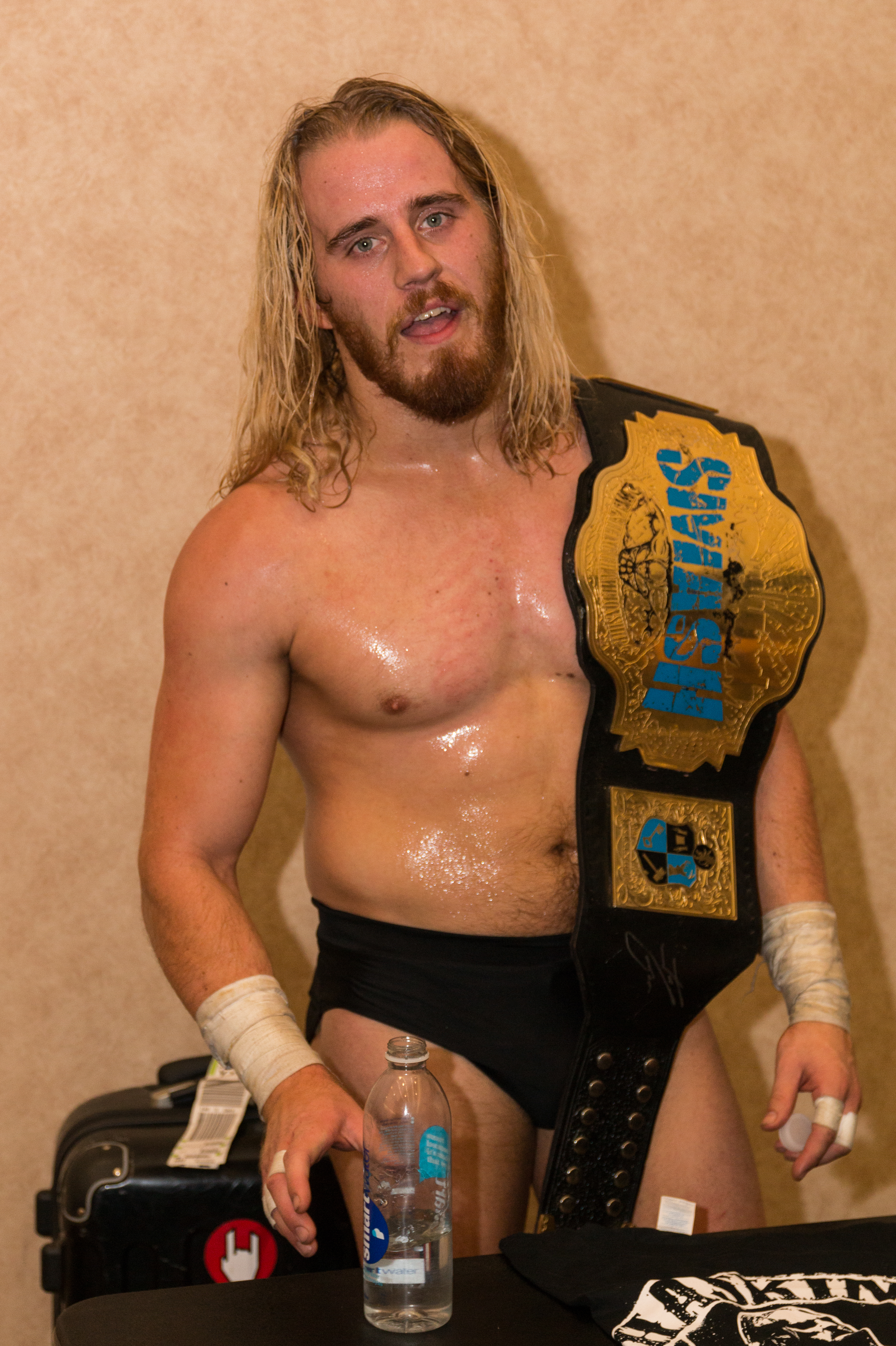
Haskins posing with the Smash Wrestling championship belt

- 4 Front Wrestling
  - 4FW Junior Heavyweight Championship (1 time)
- 5 Star Wrestling
  - 5 Star Wrestling Tap or Snap Championship (1 time, inaugural)
  - 5 Star Wrestling Tap or Snap Championship Tournament (2018)
- Burning Heart Pro Wrestling
  - Burning Heart World Championship (1 time)
  - Burning Heart World Championship Tournament (2025)
- Defiant Wrestling
  - Defiant Tag Team Championship (1 time) – with Jimmy Havoc
- Fight! Nation
  - FNW British Championship (1 time)
- Frontline Wrestling
  - Frontline Heavyweight Championship (1 time, inaugural)
  - Frontline Heavyweight Championship Tournament (2018)
- Herts and Essex Wrestling
  - HEW Heavyweight Championship (1 time)
- Ironfist Wrestling
  - Ironfist British Championship (1 time)
- International Pro Wrestling: United Kingdom
  - IPW:UK World Championship (3 times)
  - IPW:UK All England Championship (1 time)
  - IPW:UK British Tag Team Championship (1 time) – with Doug Basham, Joel Redman and Ricky Hype
- Lucha Forever
  - Lucha Forever Championship (1 time, final)
- New Generation Wrestling
  - NGW Heavyweight Championship (1 time)
- Over the Top Wrestling
  - OTT World Championship (1 time)
  - OTT Gender Neutral Championship (3 times)
  - OTT No Limits Championship (1 time)
  - Know Your Enemy Golden Ticket (2018)
- Premier British Wrestling
  - King of Cruisers (2013)
- Plex Rock 'n' Wrestling
  - Plex Wrestling British Championship (1 time)
- Premier Promotions
  - PWF Tag Team Championship (1 time) – with Mark Sloan
  - Ian Dowland Trophy (2009)
  - Tag Team Championship Tournament (2009) – with Mark Sloan
  - Worthing Trophy (1 time)
- Pro Wrestling Illustrated
  - Ranked No. 43 of the top 500 wrestlers in the PWI 500 in 2017
- Progress Wrestling
  - Progress World Championship (1 time)
  - Progress Tag Team Championship (1 time) – with Jimmy Havoc
  - Thunderbastard (2015)
- Real Quality Wrestling
  - RQW Cruiserweight Championship (2 times)
  - RQW Tag Team Championship (1 time) – with Joel Redman
- Rebel County Wrestling
  - RCW Rebel X Championship (1 time)
- Revolution Pro Wrestling
  - RPW British Cruiserweight Championship (2 times)
  - RPW Undisputed British Tag Team Championship (2 times) – with Doug Basham, Iestyn Rees, Ricky Hype (1) and Joel Redman (1)
- Ring of Honor
  - ROH International Cup (2018)
- Smash Wrestling
  - Smash Wrestling Championship (1 time)
  - Gold Tournament (2017)
- Southside Wrestling Entertainment
  - SWE Heavyweight Championship (1 time)
  - SWE Speed King Championship (1 time)
  - SWE Tag Team Championship (1 time) – with Robbie X
  - Speed King Tournament (2016)
- TNT Extreme Wrestling
  - TNT World Championship (1 time)
  - TNT Ultra X Championship (1 time)
- United Wrestling UK
  - United Wrestling Championship (1 time)
- Unlimited Wrestling
  - Red Diamond Cup (2025)
