= New Generation Wrestling =

British professional wrestling promotion

- New Generation Wrestling's logo
- Acronym: NGW
- Founded: May 2008
- Style: Professional wrestling Sports entertainment
- Headquarters: Hull, United Kingdom
- Founder: Luke Ingamells
- Owner: Richard Dunn
- Website: www.newgenwrestling.com

New Generation Wrestling (NGW) is a currently active British professional wrestling promotion based in Hull, founded by Luke Ingamells in 2008.

NGW is featured regularly on Challenge TV's WrestleTalk and British Wrestling Round-Up programs, and on Bay TV Liverpool and the Lincolnshire-based Estuary TV.

== History ==
=== The Eastmount Years (2008–2012) ===
New Generation Wrestling put on its first event on 16 May 2008 at Hull's Eastmount Recreation Centre. Line-ups featured local new wrestlers, such as "Prima Donna" Nathan Cruz and "The Amazing" Matt Myers, and wrestlers from the British independent circuit, such as Dave Rayne and Stixx.

The rivalry between Nathan Cruz and 15-year veteran Alex Shane culminated in a match between the two at NGW's 2nd Anniversary Show in June 2010. This match saw Cruz defeat Shane for the right to the "Showstealer" moniker. Cruz went on to become a successful heel (villain) in the company, winning the NGW Championship in early 2011 and holding it for nearly a year. At Eternal Glory in December 2011, Cruz lost the title to Matt Myers.

In December 2011, NGW held its first show on the road at Pontefract Town Hall.

=== The Sports Arena and TV Exposure (2012–2015) ===
As the NGW following grew, the promotion held its first event at Hull's Sports Arena (now the Airco Arena) in July 2012, featuring appearances from former WWE Diva and TNA Knockout Winter, as well as British wrestler Kendo Nagasaki. While the majority of NGW shows remained at the Eastmount Recreation Centre, the July event was the first of many regular happenings at the Arena, which promoter Richard Dunn had wanted to use for wrestling for years. NGW shows at the Arena were watched by wrestler-turned-TV-producer Alex Shane.

Starting late 2012 and continuing throughout 2013, developments surrounding NGW events and storylines were covered regularly on WrestleTalk TV, a wrestling talk show on Challenge TV produced by Shane. In April 2013, a spin-off series was launched by the British Wrestling Council titled BWC: British Wrestling Round-Up in what was effectively British wrestling's return to national television for the first time in 25 years. NGW remained a staple of the show throughout its several changes in format and has used the platform to showcase matches to a nationwide audience. In 2014 there was an increase in the number of shows put on at the Sports Arena, later renamed the Airco Arena.

In early 2013, NGW Champion Rampage Brown had a storyline falling-out with management, resulting in him no longer being recognised as the titleholder, despite still being in possession of the belt. As a new champion was crowned in his absence, the company ended up having two champions when Rampage made his return several months later and aligned himself with NGW owner Richie West's faction The Control. The rivalry between El Ligero and Rampage Brown over the rightful claim to the NGW Championship was the most prominent story throughout 2014, culminating in a critically acclaimed 30-Minute Iron Man Match between the two at Eternal Glory in December. Rampage picked up the victory after a shocking attack by Ligero's best friend and tag team partner, Dara Diablo, and became the first ever NGW Undisputed Champion.

Another focal point of NGW programming has been the ongoing Davey Boy Cup Tournament, put together by the daughter of the late British Bulldog, Georgia Smith. Following qualifying matches which took place throughout 2014, the four finalists were revealed in early 2015 to be Nathan Cruz, Zack Gibson, Bubblegum and Mike "Wildboar" Hitchman, with matches among them scheduled for the next few months.

In March 2015, the announcement was made that NGW matches would be available on-demand as part of the BWC British Wrestling Weekly subscription service.

=== Hull City Hall (2015) ===
In March 2015, plans to install an indoor football pitch at the Airco Arena effectively blocked local communities from the venue, among them New Generation Wrestling, who later announced that they had acquired the Hull City Hall for future shows.

== NGW Academy ==
NGW runs its own wrestling academy. The Academy provides training for aspiring in-ring performers and for auxiliary roles. Advanced classes at the Academy's Hull facility are led by Nathan Cruz and Matt Myers. The Academy also holds seminars with guest trainers including Fit Finlay, Doug Williams, Nigel McGuinness, Winter, Rockstar Spud, Dave Taylor and many more.

The NGW Academy launched a second facility in Birtley, Gateshead in the summer of 2014 with head trainer Rampage Brown.

=== NGW Proving Ground ===
February 2011 saw the start of a series of Academy shows under the "NGW Proving Ground" banner. Acting as developmental events, the main objective of the shows is to showcase the future stars of British wrestling, but they also feature established names of the main roster.

As of 2018, the company introduced the Proving Ground Championship where the inaugural champion was upcomer Ace Matthews. 2020 saw the company also introduce the Proving Ground Tag Team Championship. The first six Proving Ground events took place at the Eastmount Recreation Centre in Hull, but ever since February 2013, they have almost exclusively been held on the road.

== Partnership with Global Force Wrestling ==
In July 2014, Jeff Jarrett's Global Force Wrestling announced working partnerships with several European promotions, including New Generation Wrestling, representing Northern England.

== Championships ==
Current champions

| Title | Current holder | Date won | Location | Notes |
|---|---|---|---|---|
| NGW Undisputed Championship | Myles Kayman | 18 October 2024 (Eternal Glory 2024) | Hull, England | Defeated Rampage Brown in a singles match with help from Reece, Rogan, And Vusek (New Gen) |
| NGW Tag Team Championship | Reece & Rogan (Yorkshire Tough) | 18 October 2024 (Eternal Glory 2024) | Hull, England | Defeated Nathen Cruz and Matt Myers in tournament finals at Eternal Glory 2024 |
| NGW Woman Championship | Allexis Falcon | June 27, 2025 (Ultimate Showdown 2025) | Hull, England | Defeated Lizzy Evo in a one-on-one at Ultimate Showdown 2025 |
| NGW Gen X Championship | Jack Bandicoot | June 27, 2025 (Ultimate Showdown 2025) | Hull, England | Defeated Vusyk, Robbie X, and Man Like Dereiss in a four-way ladder match |

NGW Undisputed Championship

Details
- Promotion: New Generation Wrestling
- Date established: 16 May 2009
- Current champion: Myles Kayman
- Date won: 18th October 2024

Other name
- NGW Heavyweight Championship
Statistics
- First champion: Alex Cyanide
- Most reigns: Nathan Cruz (3 reigns)
- Longest reign: Nathan Cruz (531 days)
- Shortest reign: Matt Myers (97 days)
- Oldest champion: Rampage Brown 28 years, 7 months, 2 days
- Youngest champion: Alex Cyanide, 19 years, 6 days
- Heaviest champion: Alex Cyanide
- Lightest champion: Matt Myers

=== NGW Undisputed Championship ===
The NGW Undisputed Championship is a professional wrestling Championship (professional wrestling) owned by the New Generation Wrestling (NGW) promotion. The title was created and debuted on 16 May 2009. The current champion is Lucas Steel, who is in his first reign.

Key
| No. | Overall reign number |
| Reign | Reign number for the specific champion |
| Days | Number of days held |
| <1 | Reign lasted less than a day |
| + | Current reign is changing daily |

| No. | Champion | Championship change | | | Reign statistics | | Notes | Ref. |
| No. | Champion | Date | Event | Location | Reign | Days | Notes | Ref. |
|---|---|---|---|---|---|---|---|---|
| 1 | Alex Cyanide | 16 May 2009 | NGW 1st Anniversary Show | Hull, England | 1 | 383 | Defeated Sam Bailey in a tournament final to become the inaugural champion. | |
| — | Vacated | 3 June 2010 | — | — | — | — | | |
| 2 | Sam Bailey | 6 June 2010 | NGW 2nd Anniversary Show | Hull, England | 1 | 244 | Defeated El Ligero, Jack Gallagher, Colossus Kennedy and Martin Kirby in a five-way elimination match to win the vacant title. | |
| 3 | Nathan Cruz | 5 February 2011 | Regeneration | Hull, England | 1 | 302 | | |
| 4 | Matt Myers | 4 December 2011 | Eternal Glory 2011 | Hull, England | 1 | 97 | | |
| 5 | Rampage Brown | 10 March 2012 | Destiny 2012 | Hull, England | 1 | 358 | | |
| — | Vacated | 3 March 2013 | — | — | — | — | | |
| 6 | Mark Haskins | 16 March 2013 | Destiny 2013 | Hull, England | 1 | 239 | This was a 30-man royal rumble match for the vacant title. | |
| 7 | El Ligero | 10 November 2013 | Eternal Glory 2013 | Hull, England | 1 | 390 | | |
| 8 | Rampage Brown | 5 December 2014 | Eternal Glory 2014 | Hull, England | 2 | 212 | | |
| 9 | Nathan Cruz | 5 July 2015 | Ultimate Showdown 2015 | Hull, England | 2 | 531 | | |
| 10 | Matt Myers | 17 December 2016 | Eternal Glory 2016 | Hull, England | 2 | 174 | | |
| 11 | Nathan Cruz | 9 June 2017 | NGW 9th Anniversary Show | Hull, England | 3 | 477 | This was a triple threat match also including Rampage Brown. | |
| 11 | Justin Sysum | September 28, 2018 | Ultimate Showdown 2018 | Hull, England | 1 | 287 | | |
| 12 | Lucas Steel | 9 December 2019 | N/A | Hull, England | 1 | 2,465+ | Vacant | |

=== Combined reigns ===
| † | Indicates the current champion |

| Rank | Wrestler | No. of reigns | Combined days |
|---|---|---|---|
| 1 | Nathan Cruz | 3 | 1,310 |
| 2 | Rampage Brown † | 3 | 571+ |
| 3 | El Ligero | 1 | 390 |
| 4 | Alex Cyanide | 1 | 383 |
| 5 | Lucas Steel | 1 | 2,465 |
| 6 | Justin Sysum | 1 | 287 |
| 7 | Matt Myers | 2 | 271 |
| 8 | Mark Haskins | 1 | 239 |
| 9 | Sam Bailey | 1 | 244 |

NGW Tag Team Championship

Details
- Promotion: New Generation Wrestling
- Date established: 4 December 2011
- Current champions: Matt Myers & Robbie X
- Date won: 7 December 2019
Statistics
- First champions: Los Amigos (Dara Diablo and El Ligero)
- Most reigns: Britain's Biggest Tag Team (2 reigns)
- Longest reign: The Proven (553 days)
- Shortest reign: Britain's Biggest Tag Team (209 days)

=== NGW Tag Team Championship ===
The NGW Tag Team Championship is a professional wrestling Championship (professional wrestling) owned by the New Generation Wrestling (NGW) promotion. The title was created and debuted on 4 December 2011. The Title was Vacated in 2020

Key
| No. | Overall reign number |
| Reign | Reign number for the specific team—reign numbers for the individuals are in parentheses, if different |
| Days | Number of days held |
| <1 | Reign lasted less than a day |
| + | Current reign is changing daily |

| No. | Champion | Championship change | | | Reign statistics | | Notes | Ref. |
| No. | Champion | Date | Event | Location | Reign | Days | Notes | Ref. |
|---|---|---|---|---|---|---|---|---|
| 1 | Los Amigos (Dara Diablo and El Ligero) | 4 December 2011 | Eternal Glory 2011 | Hull, England | 1 | 307 | Defeated The Predators (Joseph Connors and Paul Malen) in a tournament final to become the inaugural champions. | |
| 2 | Team GB (Sam Bailey and Zack Gibson) | 6 October 2012 | Full Force 2012 | Hull, England | 1 | 400 | This was a three-way tag team match also involving The Predators (Joseph Conners and Paul Malen. | |
| 3 | Britain's Biggest Tag Team (Colossus Kennedy and Stixx) | 10 November 2013 | Eternal Glory 2013 | Hull, England | 1 | 308 | | |
| 4 | The London Riots (James Davis and Rob Lynch) | 14 September 2014 | NGW 50 | Hull, England | 1 | 413 | | |
| 5 | Britain's Biggest Tag Team (Colossus Kennedy and Stixx) | 1 November 2015 | Eternal Glory 2015 | Liverpool, England | 2 | 209 | | |
| 6 | Insane Fight Club (Joe Hendry, Kid Fite and Lionheart) | 28 May 2016 | Ultimate Showdown 2016 | Hull, England | 1 | 377 | This was a three-on-two handicap match. All members are recognized as champions under the freebird rule. | |
| 7 | The Proven (Caz Crash and Sam Wilder) | 9 June 2017 | NGW 9th Anniversary Show | Hull, England | 1 | 553 | | |
| 8 | Alpha Bad (Iestyn Rees and Kip Sabian) | 14 December 2018 | Eternal Glory 2018 | Hull, England | 1 | N/A | Mark Haskins replaced Sam Wilder in the match. The exact length of this reign is uncertain. | |
| — | Vacated | 2019 | — | — | — | — | | |
| 9 | Matt Myers and Robbie X | 7 December 2019 | Eternal Glory 2019 | Hull, England | 1 | 2,465+ | Defeated Nathan Cruz and Rampage Brown in a tournament final to win the vacant titles. | |

NGW GenX Championship

Details
- Promotion: New Generation Wrestling
- Date established: 22 December 2015
- Current champion: Lucas Steel
- Date won: 14 December 2018
Statistics
- First champion: Bubblegum
- Longest reign: Robbie X (447 days)
- Shortest reign: Bubblegum (207 days)

=== NGW GenX Championship ===
The NGW GenX Championship is a professional wrestling Championship (professional wrestling) owned by the New Generation Wrestling (NGW) promotion. The title was created and debuted on 22 December 2015.

The current champion is Lucas Steel, who is in his First reign.

| # | Order in reign history |
| Reign | The reign number for the specific set of wrestlers listed |
| Event | The event promoted by the respective promotion in which the titles were won |
| — | Used for vacated reigns in order to not count it as an official reign |

| # | Wrestlers | Reign | Date | Days held | Location | Event | Notes |
|---|---|---|---|---|---|---|---|
| 1 | Bubblegum | 1 | 22 December 2015 | 207 | Hull, England | Eternal Glory at Christmas 2015 | Defeated Mark Andrews and Wildboar in a Three way match for the Vacant title. |
| 2 | Matt Myers | 1 | 16 July 2016 | 351 | Hull, England | 8th Anniversary Show | |
| — | Vacated | — | 2 July 2017 | — | — | — | |
| 3 | Robbie X | 1 | 23 September 2017 | 447 | Hull, England | Regeneration-X 2017 | This was four-way ladder match also involving Jake McCluskey, Kip Sabian and Matt Myers for the vacant title. |
| 4 | Lucas Steel | 1 | 14 December 2018 | 2,823+ | Hull, England | Eternal Glory 2018 | |

NGW Proving Grounds Championship

Details
- Promotion: New Generation Wrestling
- Date established: 7 April 2018
- Current champion: Conor Renshaw
- Date won: 8 July 2018
Statistics
- First champion: Ace Matthews
- Longest reign: Conor Renshaw (2982+ days)
- Shortest reign: Ace Matthews (92 days)

=== NGW Proving Ground Championship ===
| # | Order in reign history |
| Reign | The reign number for the specific set of wrestlers listed |
| Event | The event promoted by the respective promotion in which the titles were won |
| — | Used for vacated reigns in order to not count it as an official reign |

| # | Wrestlers | Reign | Date | Days held | Location | Event | Notes |
|---|---|---|---|---|---|---|---|
| 1 | Ace Matthews | 1 | 7 April 2018 | 92 | Hull, England | Homecoming 2018 | Defeated Conor Renshaw to become the inaugural champion. |
| — | Vacated | — | 8 July 2018 | — | Beverley, England | Proving Ground 40: Beverley | Matthews forced to vacate the title due to injury. |
| 2 | Conor Renshaw | 1 | 8 July 2018 | 2,982+ | Beverley, England | Proving Ground 40: Beverley | Defeated Chuck Wood to win the vacant title. |

== See also ==
- Professional wrestling in the United Kingdom
- WrestleTalk TV
