= 1PW Tag Team Championship =

Professional wrestling tag team championship

1PW World Tag Team Championship

Details
- Promotion: One Pro Wrestling
- Date established: May 2006
- Date retired: 29 September 2023
Statistics
- First champions: Jonny Storm and Jody Fleisch
- Final champions: Man Like DeReiss and Leon Slater
- Longest reign: Kid Fite and Liam Thompson (654 Days)
- Shortest reign: Dragon Aisu and Majik (27 Days)
- Oldest champion: Jonny Storm (29 years and 178 days)
- Youngest champion: Leon Slater (18 years old)
- Heaviest champion: Colt Cobana and Darren Burridge (453lbs (205kg) combined)
- Lightest champion: Dragon Phoenix and Spud (283lbs (128kg) combined)

The One Pro Wrestling (1PW) Tag Team Championship was a professional wrestling tag team championship created and promoted by the British promotion One Pro Wrestling. The title was established in 2006, and became defunct upon the company's closure on 29 September 2023. Title reigns were determined by professional wrestling matches with different wrestlers involved in pre-existing scripted feuds, plots, and storylines. Wrestlers were portrayed as either villains or fan favorites as they followed a series of tension-building events, which culminated in a wrestling match or series of matches for the championship.

Like most professional wrestling championships, the title was won as a result of a scripted match. There have been a total of nine reigns shared between eight different teams.

== Title history ==
As of 4 April 2025.

Key
No.	Overall reign number
Reign	Reign number for the specific team—reign numbers for the individuals are in parentheses, if different
Days	Number of days held
+	Current reign is changing daily

No.	Champion	Championship change			Reign statistics		Notes	Ref.
No.	Champion	Date	Event	Location	Reign	Days	Notes	Ref.
1	Jonny Storm and Jody Fleisch	27 May 2006	Know Your Enemy	Doncaster, South Yorkshire	1	140	Defeated AJ Styles and Christopher Daniels in a tournament final to become the inaugural champions.	
2	Team Shag (Colt Cabana and Darren Burridge)	14 October 2006	1PW First Anniversary Show	Doncaster, South Yorkshire	1	175	This was a four-way Ladder match also involving Jonny Storm and Jody Fleisch, and Southern Comfort (Chris Hamrick and Tracy Smothers).	
—	Vacated	7 April 2007	—	—	—	—	Vacated due to a legitimate injury to Darren Burridge.	
3	The Dragon Hearts (Dragon Phoenix and Spud)	30 June 2007	Know Your Enemy	Doncaster, South Yorkshire	1	105	Defeated The Chavs (Harry Mills and Mark Haskins), BritRage (Mark Sloan and Wade Fitzgerald), Pain Inc. (Joseph Hayes and Ruffneck), Invisible Mad Man Manson and Mad Man Manson, and The Iron Lions (Andy Boy Simmonz and James Tighe) in a gauntlet tag team match to win the vacant titles.	
4	The Damned Nation (Dragon Aisu and Majik)	13 October 2007	1PW Second Anniversary Show	Doncaster, South Yorkshire	1	155	This was a Lumberjack match.	
5	Hubba Bubba Lucha (Bubblegum and El Ligero)	16 March 2008	Academy	Edlington, South Yorkshire	1	69		
6	The Damned Nation (Dragon Aisu and Majik)	24 May 2008	Damned Nation: Will Not Die	Edlington, South Yorkshire	2	27		
7	Project Ego (Kris Travis and Martin Kirby)	20 June 2008	The Underground X	Edlington, South Yorkshire	1	513		
8	Fight Club (Kid Fite and Liam Thompson)	15 November 2009	1PW Fourth Anniversary Show	Doncaster, South Yorkshire	1	654		
—		31 August 2011	—	—			Deactivated due to the closure of One Pro Wrestling	
9	Boisterous Behaviour (Man Like DeReiss and Leon Slater)	22 April 2023	All or Nothing	Doncaster, South Yorkshire	1	146	Defeated Bullet Club (Ace Austin and Chris Bey) and Subculture (Flash Morgan Webster and Mark Andrews) and Zachary Wentz in a Ladder match for the reactivated titles.	
—	Vacated	15 September 2023	—	—	—	—	All championships were vacated after multiple wrestlers ended their working relationships with 1PW	
—	Deactivated	29 September 2023	—	—	—	—	Title was deactivated over One Pro Wrestling's closure.	

== Combined reigns ==
As of 4 April 2025.

†	Indicates the current champions

=== By team ===
Rank	Team	No. of reigns	Combined days
1	Fight Club (Kid Fite and Liam Thompson)	1	654
2	Project Ego (Kris Travis and Martin Kirby)	1	513
3	The Damned Nation (Dragon Aisu and Majik)	2	182
4	Team Shag (Colt Cabana and Darren Burridge)	1	175
5	Boisterous Behaviour (Man Like DeReiss and Leon Slater)	1	146
6	Jonny Storm and Jody Fleisch	1	140
7	The Dragon Hearts (Dragon Phoenix and Spud)	1	105
8	Hubba Bubba Lucha (Bubblegum and El Ligero)	1	69

=== By wrestler ===
Rank	Wrestler	No. of reigns	Combined days
1	Kid Fite	1	654
1	Liam Thompson	1	654
3	Kris Travis	1	513
3	Martin Kirby	1	513
5	Dragon Aisu	2	182
5	Majik	2	182
7	Colt Cabana	1	175
7	Darren Burridge	1	175
9	Man Like DeReiss	1	146
9	Leon Slater	1	146
11	Jonny Storm	1	140
11	Jody Fleisch	1	140
13	Dragon Phoenix	1	105
13	Spud	1	105
15	Bubblegum	1	69
15	El Ligero	1	69
