= Ayesha Raymond =

English professional wrestler

Personal information
- Born: Ayesha-Michelle Sonia Raymond-Housen; 24 September 1996 (age 29) East London, Hackney, England

Professional wrestling career
- Ring name(s): AMAZON, Ayesha Ray, Ayesha Raymond (wwe maeyoungclassic), Amazon BLACKIE (Wrestling STARS France)
- Billed height: 6 ft 1 in (185 cm)
- Billed from: London, England
- Trained by: Paul Ashe; Justin Richards; Robbie Brookside; Chic Cullen; Nanae Takahashi; Natsuki Taiyo
- Debut: 2003

Ayesha-Michelle (born 24 September 1996) is an English professional wrestler, entertainer, actress and stunt actress known by her ring and stage names Ayesha Raymond and Amazon. She is known mainly for her work in the WWE inaugural Mae Young Classic, Japan's World Wonder Ring Stardom, Seadlinnng Japan, WOS (World of Sport ITV), and is the current Owner and Lead Coach at Renegade Wrestling Dojo (Scotland), formally The Fierce Females Dojo.

Ayesha is credited and featured in Warner Brothers DC Universe Pennyworth as Mad Janet Murphy. Raymond is currently signed to Japanese wrestling promotion Seadlinnng as of May 2022 as their first international permanent member. Currently residing in Kawasaki, Japan; Ayesha is the first British signed member of a joshi company residing, living and travelling from Japan.

== Professional wrestling career ==
Ayesha Raymond is a professional wrestler from the East End of London. She trained in wrestling from the age of 15 and has a background in bodybuilding. Raymond has cited early interest in wrestling, including practicing with her brothers during childhood. She has received training from British wrestlers such as Johnny Saint and Tony Scarlo, as well as WWE Performance Center coach Robbie Brookside. In 2017, she participated in the Mae Young Classic tournament.

== Championships and accomplishments ==
- German Wrestling Federation
  - GWF Women's Championship (1 time)
- International Pro Wrestling: United Kingdom
  - IPW:UK Tag Team Championship (1 time) – with Paul Robinson, Will Ospreay and Scott Wainwright
  - IPW:UK Women's Championship (1 time)
- Premier Promotions
  - PWF Ladies Championship (1 time, current)
  - PWF Ladies Tag Team Championship (1 time) – with Destiny
- Reckless Intent Wrestling
  - Reckless Intent Hardcore Champion (1 time)
- World Wonder Ring Stardom
  - Artist of Stardom Championship (1 time) – with Alpha Female and Kyoko Kimura
- Ultimate Pro Wrestling
  - UPW Women's Championship (1 time and current)
- WrestleForce
  - WrestleForce Women's Championship (1 time)
- World War Wrestling
  - WWW Women's Championship (1 time)
- ROE GLAM Austria
  - Women's Champion (two time)
- Scottish Wrestling Entertainment
  - Empress Women's Championship (one time)
- Alba Championship Wrestling women's champion (one time and current)
- HEW Women's Champion (1 time and current)
- CCW (Collier Championship Wrestling) (one time and current)
