= Damon Leigh =

English professional wrestler

Personal information
- Born: Damon Bradley Leigh, Greater Manchester, UK

Professional wrestling career
- Ring name(s): Damon Leigh; DDL
- Billed height: 6 ft 2 in (1.88 m)
- Billed weight: 234 lb (106 kg)
- Billed from: Leigh, Greater Manchester, UK
- Trained by: Alex Shane; Chris Hero; Robbie Brookside
- Debut: 2001

Damon Bradley is an English professional wrestler, better known by his ring name, "Deadly" Damon Leigh.

== Professional wrestling career ==
Bradley first became involved in British wrestling when he joined NPWA to begin his training with Steve Starr and FaHrenheit. It was there where he met and helped to train tag team partner and longtime friend Joey Hayes and also first encountered longtime rival Heresy. Other students at the gym at that time were Roxi and TJ Cain.

Along with many of his peers from NPWA, Bradley moved on to become part of Grand Pro Wrestling (GPW). He was one of the wrestlers on GPW's roster when the promotion first opened. During his time with the company, he has held the GPW British Championship on four occasions, feuding with such wrestlers as Alex Shane over the title. Bradley started making appearances all round the UK wrestling scene for All Star Wrestling and Frontier Wrestling. In more recent times he has travelled across Europe to wrestle for Westside Xtreme Wrestling in Germany and Dutch Championship Wrestling in the Netherlands, as well as XWA and FutureShock Wrestling in the North West.

Away from shows he has also played an instrumental part in helping to train a lot of the current British wrestlers from the North West, including Joey Hayes, Danny Hope, CJ Banks, Juggernaut and many others.

Damon is also credited with being an instrumental part in the running of GPW, turning his hand to promoting shows for a number of months during 2004 - 2005 and then helping out behind the scenes.

In May 2017 Damon was inducted into the Grand Pro Wrestling Hall of Fame. He was inducted by Johnnie "Heresy" Brannigan.

== Personal life ==
Bradley is married with two children.

== Championships and accomplishments ==
- Grand Pro Wrestling
  - GPW British Championship (4 times)
  - GPW Tag Team Championship (with Joey Hayes)
  - GPW Heavyweight Championship
