= TNT World Championship =

Professional wrestling championship

- The current title design (2015 – present)

Details
- Promotion: TNT Extreme Wrestling
- Date established: November 2015
- Current champion: Tate Mayfairs
- Date won: 17 September 2023

Other names
- TNT World Championship (2015–2026)
Statistics
- First champion: Bubblegum
- Most reigns: All titleholders (1 reign)
- Longest reign: Tate Mayfairs 1,127+
- Shortest reign: Che Monet and Leon Slater (<1 day)
- Youngest champion: Leon Slater (18 years, 109 days)
- Heaviest champion: Walter (295 lb (134 kg))
- Lightest champion: Bubblegum (145 lb (66 kg))

The TNT Undisputed World Championship is a professional wrestling World championship created and promoted by the British professional wrestling promotion TNT Extreme Wrestling. It is the top championship of the promotion.

== Title history ==
There have been a total of eleven reigns and two vacancies shared between eleven different wrestlers. Bubblegum was the inaugural champion and also holds the record for the longest reign to day at 649 days. Leon Slater was the youngest champion winning the title at 18 years old and also ties the record for the shortest reign with Che Monet. The current champion is Tate Mayfairs who is in his first reign. He won the championship at TNT Vs. GCW on 17 September 2023 by defeating Che Monet.

== Reigns ==
Key
No.	Overall reign number
Reign	Reign number for the specific champion
Days	Number of days held
<1	Reign lasted less than a day
+	Current reign is changing daily

No.	Champion	Championship change			Reign statistics		Notes	Ref.
No.	Champion	Date	Event	Location	Reign	Days	Notes	Ref.
1	Bubblegum	19 December 2015	TNT Cold Day In Hell	Liverpool, England	1	649	Defeated Mark Haskins and Rampage Brown in a three-way match to become the inaugural champion.	
2	Joseph Conners	28 September 2017	TNT Summer Explosion 2017	Liverpool, England	1	280	Ashton Smith replaced Bubblegum in the title defense.	
3	Walter	5 July 2018	TNT Going Off Big Time 2018	Liverpool, England	1	63		
4	Jordan Devlin	6 September 2018	TNT Summer Explosion 2018	Liverpool, England	1	84	This was a three-way match also involving Joseph Conners.	
—	Vacated	November 29, 2018	—	—	—	—		
5	Mark Haskins	21 February 2019	TNT Merseyside Massacre 2019	Liverpool, England	1	224	Defeated David Starr and El Phantasmo in a three-way match to win the vacant title.	
6	David Starr	3 October 2019	TNT Cold Day In Hell 2019	Liverpool, England	1	140	This was a ladder match.	
—	Vacated	February 20, 2020	—	—	—	—		
7	Dan Moloney	25 November 2021	TNT Cold Day In Hell 2021	Liverpool, England	1	415	Defeated Adam Maxted, Dean Allmark and Nathan Cruz in a four-way match to win the vacant title.	
8	Leon Slater	14 January 2023	TNT Merseyside Massacre 2023	Liverpool, England	1	<1		
9	Charles Crowley	14 January 2023	TNT Merseyside Massacre 2023	Liverpool, England	1	246		
10	Che Monet	17 September 2023	TNT Vs. GCW 2023	Liverpool, England	1	<1	This was a no disqualification match. This was a Game Changer Wrestling event.	
11	Tate Mayfairs	17 September 2023	TNT Vs. GCW 2023	Liverpool, England	1	1,127+		

== Combined reigns ==
As of October 18, 2026.

†	Indicates the current champion

Rank	Wrestler	No. of reigns	Combined days
1	Tate Mayfairs †	1	1,127+
2	Bubblegum	1	649
3	Dan Moloney	1	415
4	Joseph Conners	1	280
5	David Starr	1	259
6	Charles Crowley	1	246
7	Mark Haskins	1	224
8	Jordan Devlin	1	84
9	Walter	1	63
10	Che Monet	1	<1
10	Leon Slater	1	<1
