= Bubblegum (wrestler) =

British professional wrestler

Personal information
- Born: Phillip Cartner; 20 June 1984 (age 42) Mobberley, England

Professional wrestling career
- Ring name(s): Bubblegum; Phil Blitz
- Billed height: 5 ft 6 in (1.68 m)
- Billed weight: 145 lb (66 kg)
- Billed from: Hubba Bubbaville, The Blue Side Of Manchester
- Trained by: AIWF-GB; Chris Curtis; Mark Belton; Keith Myatt
- Debut: 2002
- Retired: 2018

Philip "Pip" Cartner (born 20 June 1984), better known by his ring name Bubblegum, is a British former professional wrestler. He has previous wrestled in many independent promotions within the United Kingdom but he is perhaps best known for his work in British Championship Wrestling (BCW), Norton British Wrestling (NBW), Preston City Wrestling (PCW: UK) and his television exposure with Frontier Wrestling Alliance (FWA), Real Quality Wrestling (RQW), Irish Whip Wrestling (IWW) and New Generation Wrestling (NGW).

== Professional wrestling career ==
Cartner began training in August 2000 with the Stoke-on-Trent based Allied Independent Wrestling Federation-Great Britain (AIWF-GB) promotion run by Chris Curtis, Cartner's extra training came from the likes of fellow AIWF stars such as Mark "5 Star" Belton, Dirk Feelgood, Johnny Phere, Kid Kaos and the 20-year veteran Keith Myatt.

Bubblegum found his place as a breakout star of the Nottingham-based Norton British Wrestling promotion, having a long-standing feud with Kris Travis over NBW's cruiserweight title since July 2005. On 8 April 2006, Bubblegum would pick up his first title winning a tag team tournament with Stixx to become the first NBW Tag Team Champions.

In 2005, Bubblegum was made into a headline act for Grand Pro Wrestling, a promotion he often calls "home" and credits for his exposure on the British scene and where he still is a main event performer. Later in 2005, he was given the chance to show off his highflying skills on television with the Frontier Wrestling Alliance as part of the FWA's Flyweight Division. Bubblegum would later be given more TV exposure, this time with Irish promotion Irish Whip Wrestling. Bubblegum continued to work for several other independent promotions during this time, forming a tag team with lucha libre wrestler El Ligero, known as Hubba-Bubba Lucha.

On 18 August 2006, Bubblegum won a nine-man Elimination match at Real Quality Wrestling's Summer Brawl 2006 to represent RQW at British Under 23's Championship event on 18 November of that year. The win would also put Bubblegum in contention to become the first Cruiserweight Champion of the company, and though Bubblegum would be unable to win the Under 23's Championship he would defeat Red Vinny at No Pain, No Gain 2007 to become the first RQW Cruiserweight Champion. He also won the first ever Crazy Cruiser-8 tournament in 2006 for Grand Pro Wrestling.

Bubblegum performed in the re-launched Frontier Wrestling Alliance during its first six months in existence, before apparently retiring in March 2010. Having just become a father, it was believed that Cartner wanted to focus on caring for his newborn son.

Despite retiring, he returned to Grand Pro Wrestling in September, where he turned on Joey Hayes and joined Dirk Feelgood's stable The Masterplan. Since then, he has returned to active wrestling in GPW.

Since October 2011, Bubblegum has been a regular at Preston City Wrestling, where he won a 6-man elimination match on his first show and competed in a Money in the Bank match in his 2nd.

In February, Bubblegum beat Greg Burridge to become the number one contender for the PCW title. He won the title match at the next show, Springslam, but as it was via disqualification, he did not win the title. However, Bubblegum did leave with the belt.

Bubblegum once again met the PCW Champion T-Bone on the 2 June show, Guild Wars.

== Championships and accomplishments ==
- 4 Front Wrestling
  - 4FW Junior Heavyweight Championship (1 time)
  - 4FW Junior Heavyweight Championship Tournament (2016)
- Absolute Wrestling
  - Absolute Wrestling Championship (1 time)
  - Absolute Wrestling Championship Tournament (2016)
- Garage/Grand Pro Wrestling
  - GPW Heavyweight Championship (2 times)
  - GPW British Championship (1 time)
  - Crazy Cruiser 8 (2006)
- Gerry Norton Promotions
  - GNP Tag Team Championship (1 time) – with Travis The Menace
  - GNP Tag Team Championship Tournament – with Travis The Menace
- Infinite Promotions
  - Infinite Promotions Tag Team Championship (1 time) – with El Ligero
  - Infinite Promotions Tag Team Championship Tournament (2014) – with El Ligero
- Just Do Wrestling
  - JDW Championship (1 time, inaugural)
  - JDW Championship Tournament (2015)
- New Generation Wrestling
  - NGW GenX Championship (1 time, inaugural)
- Norton British Wrestling
  - NBW Cruiserweight Championship (1 time)
  - NBW Tag Team Championship (1 time) – with Stixx
  - NBW Tag Team Championship Tournament (2006)– with Stixx
- Northern Wrestling League
  - NWL Elite Tag Team Championship (1 time) – with El Ligero
- One Pro Wrestling
  - 1PW Tag Team Championship (1 time) – with El Ligero
- Premier British Wrestling
  - PBW Tag Team Championship (1 time) – with Brad Fusion
  - King of Cruisers (2008, 2009)
- Preston City Wrestling
  - PCW Cruiserweight Championship (2 times)
  - Kris Travis Memorial (2017)
  - Road to Glory Tournament (2015)
- Real Quality Wrestling
  - RQW Cruiserweight Championship (1 time)
  - RQW European Cruiserweight Championship (1 time)
- SAS Wrestling
  - SAS United Kingdom Championship (1 time)
  - SAS Tag Team Championship (1 time) – with El Ligero
- Southside Wrestling Entertainment
  - SWE Speed King Championship (2 times)
  - Speed King Tournament (2017)
  - Opportunity Knocks (2017)
- TNT Extreme Wrestling
  - TNT World Championship (1 time)
