= Kris Travis =

British wrestler

- Travis in 2010

Personal information
- Born: Kristoffer Darren Travis; 16 December 1983 Sheffield, South Yorkshire, England
- Died: 31 March 2016 (aged 32)

Professional wrestling career
- Ring name(s): Kris Travis; Travis The Menace
- Billed height: 6 ft 1 in (1.85 m)
- Billed weight: 207 lb (94 kg)
- Trained by: Alan Johnson
- Debut: 2002
- Retired: 21 September 2015

Kris Travis (16 December 1983 – 31 March 2016) was a British professional wrestler. He was a staple of the UK and European independent wrestling scenes, working for companies such as PROGRESS Wrestling, Insane Championship Wrestling, Preston City Wrestling, Premier British Wrestling, Revolution Pro Wrestling, Westside Xtreme Wrestling, British Championship Wrestling, One Pro Wrestling, Total Nonstop Action, Frontier Wrestling Alliance and others, until his death in 2016.

== Professional wrestling career ==
=== Early career (2002−2008) ===
Trained in Sheffield by Alan Johnson, Travis began competing on shows in the North of England in 2002. His earliest successes came in Grand Pro Wrestling, where he held the GPW Tag Team Championship with Scotty Hexx in an early incarnation of the popular Project Ego team, and in Norton British Wrestling, where he held the NBW Cruiserweight Championship. He received further training from Stixx and Keith Myatt, which he believed helped him get onto bigger shows.

=== Rise to prominence (2009−2014) ===
In the late 2000s, Travis added Martin Kirby to the Project Ego team. The duo found some notable success, winning the RDW Tag Team Championships, the 1PW Tag Team Championships, the 3CW Tag Team Championships, the IPW:UK Tag Team Championships and the RPW Undisputed British Tag Team Championship. They would also compete for notable promotions like PROGRESS Wrestling, Insane Championship Wrestling, Premier British Wrestling and more.

Travis also had singles success, most notably in Preston City Wrestling. On 17 August 2012, Kravis defeated Lionheart to win the PCW Heavyweight Championship. In Lionheart's Pro Wrestling Elite promotion, Travis challenged Andy Wild for the PWE World Heavyweight Championship in a losing effort. He also had the opportunity to compete outside of the UK for Westside Xtreme Wrestling in Germany, in a triple threat with BxB Hulk and John Klinger. He competed on one occasion for Total Nonstop Action, while taking part in their British Boot Camp television series.

=== Hiatus and illness (2014) ===
Travis was forced to take a hiatus from wrestling due to a diagnosis of stomach cancer in September, 2014. Wrestlers such as CM Punk, Colt Cabana, William Regal and Chris Jericho gave words of support. During this time he worked with cancer charities to raise funds and made a couple of non-wrestling appearances at shows.

=== Return (2015) ===
In June 2015, it was announced that Travis had beaten cancer and would be returning to the ring. He wrestled Sha Samuels for PCW in his return match on 7 August 2015, before capturing the PWE Tag Team Championship with Lou King Sharp in Scotland .

He was victorious in singles competition against Chris Tyler for HOPE Wrestling in Nottingham and against his Project Ego partner Martin Kirby at Attack! Pro Wrestling in Cardiff, Wales. Travis also returned to Southside Wrestling Entertainment alongside Martin Kirby at 9 August 2015 show, where the pair were revealed as the surprise final entrant in a tag-team gauntlet match for the SWE Tag Team Championships which Travis and Kirby won for the first time that night.

In one of the bigger singles matches of his career, Travis was defeated by Drew Galloway in an ICW World Heavyweight Championship match in Edinburgh. Travis' final match, was a victory over Marty Scurll at PROGRESS' Chapter 21: You Know We Don't Like to Use the Sit Down Gun on 6 September 2015.

== Death ==
On 21 September 2015 Travis announced that his cancer had returned and he would be forced to retire from professional wrestling.

Travis died on 31 March 2016 at 32 years old. There was a large outpouring of tributes from fans, publications, promotions and wrestlers alike, including Kevin Owens, Paige, The Young Bucks, Drew Galloway, Noam Dar, Finn Bálor, WWE, Impact Wrestling, Neville and more.

Cody Rhodes and Tommaso Ciampa began the "Our Ladder" fundraising initiative for Cavendish Cancer Care in Travis' name in April 2016. Donovan Dijak and Mike Bennett helped raise funds for CCC, in tribute to Travis.

Fans and professional wrestlers alike began petitioning for Travis to be given the WWE Hall of Fame "Warrior Award".

There was a large number of tributes to Travis in the weeks following his death. Noam Dar dedicated his qualifying match for the WWE Cruiserweight Classic series to Travis, and Will Ospreay both wore ring attire themed after Travis' pink tights in his NJPW debut and dedicated his Best of the Super Juniors victory to Travis. At NXT Takeover: Dallas, the day after Travis passed, Finn Balor paid tribute by painting Travis's trademark stars on one hand and a black love heart on the other.

== Championships and accomplishments ==
- 3 Count Wrestling
  - 3CW Tag Team Championship (1 time) – with Martin Kirby
- Elite British Wrestling
  - EBW Catch Championship (1 time)
- Fighting Spirit Magazine
  - UK Wrestler of the Year (2013)
- International Pro Wrestling: United Kingdom
  - IPW:UK Tag Team Championship (1 time) – with Martin Kirby
- Gerry Norton Promotions
  - GNP Championship (1 time)
  - GNP Tag Team Championship (1 time) – with Bubblegum
  - GNP Tag Team Title Tournament (2009) – with Bubblegum
  - Elite 8 Tournament (2008)
- Grand Pro Wrestling
  - GPW Tag Team Championship (1 time) – with Scotty Hexx
- Northern Wrestling League
  - NWL British Heavyweight Championship (1 time)
- Norton British Wrestling
  - NBW Championship (1 time)
  - NBW Cruiserweight Championship (1 time)
- One Pro Wrestling
  - 1PW Tag Team Championship (1 time) – with Martin Kirby
- Powerslam Magazine
  - Ranked No. 45 of the top 50 singles wrestlers of 2013
- Preston City Wrestling
  - PCW Heavyweight Championship (1 time)
  - Money in the Bank (2011, 2013)
- Pro Wrestling Elite
  - PWE Tag Team Championship (1 time) - with Lou King Sharp
- Real Deal Wrestling
  - RDW Tag Team Championship (1 time) - with Martin Kirby
- Revolution Pro Wrestling
  - RPW Undisputed British Tag Team Championship (1 time) - with Martin Kirby
- Southside Wrestling Entertainment
  - SWE Tag Team Championship (1 time) – with Martin Kirby

== See also ==
- List of premature professional wrestling deaths
