= Dom Travis =

English professional wrestler

Personal information
- Born: Dominic Travis; September 14, 1980 Bolton, England
- Died: April 14, 2012 (aged 31)

Professional wrestling career
- Ring name: Dom Travis
- Billed height: 6 ft 2 in (188 cm)
- Billed weight: 246 lb (112 kg)
- Trained by: Lance Storm, Alex Shane
- Debut: 2003
- Retired: 2011

Dominic Travis (September 14, 1980 – April 14, 2012) was an English professional wrestler who worked in independent promotions in England.

== Career ==
Travis was trained by English wrestler Alex Shane and Canadian wrestler Lance Storm. Travis mainly worked for FutureShock Wrestling and Garage Pro Wrestling. In 2007 he became FutureShock Wrestling's first ever Champion which he held the title for over a year.

== Death ==
Travis committed suicide on April 14, 2012. He was 31.

== Championships and accomplishments ==
- FutureShock Wrestling
  - FSW Championship (1 time)
  - FSW Tag Team Championship (1 time) – with Cliton Steele
- Grand Pro Wrestling
  - GPW Tag Team Championship (2 times) – with Heresy
