= Pro Wrestling World Cup Qualifiers =

- Promotion(s): WhatCulture Pro Wrestling; New Japan Pro-Wrestling; Revolution Pro Wrestling
- Date: March 21, 2017–July 22, 2017 (aired March 25, 2017, March 31, 2017, May 5, 2017, May 26, 2017, July 14, 2017, July 15, 2017, and July 29, 2017)
- City: See venues
- Venue: See venues

WhatCulture Pro Wrestling event chronology
← Previous; Bulletproof: Championship Showdown	Next → State of Emergency; HendryMania; Fight Back; Built to Destroy; Stacked

The Pro Wrestling World Cup qualifiers was a multi-day professional wrestling event which consisted of qualifier matches for the Pro Wrestling World Cup produced by WhatCulture Pro Wrestling (WCPW) which took place from March 21, 2017 to July 22, 2017 which primarily took place in the United Kingdom but also had qualifiers in Toronto, Ontario, Canada and Berlin, Germany with every show airing on tape delay on March 25, 2017, March 31, 2017, May 5, 2017, May 26, 2017, July 14, 2017, July 15, 2017, and July 29, 2017 on YouTube respectively. The Japanese qualifiers were also co-produced with New Japan Pro-Wrestling (NJPW) and Revolution Pro Wrestling (RevPro).

== Production ==
=== Background ===
On February 13, 2017, WCPW announced the Pro Wrestling World Cup, a 64-man single elimination tournament with various qualifying matches taking place from March 21-July 22, 2017 in Nottingham, England, Motherwell, Scotland, Toronto, Ontario, Canada, Berlin, Germany, and Manchester, England. The finals were also announced to take place on August 23, 2017 at Planet Ice Milton Keynes in Milton Keynes, England, August 24, 2017 at the Bowlers Exhibition Centre in Manchester, England, and August 26, 2017 at Sport Central in Newcastle Upon Tyne, England and would feature Rey Mysterio, Jr., Kenny Williams, Kushida, Ricochet, Will Ospreay, Mike Bailey, Angelico, Hiromu Takahashi, Penta El Zero M, and Jay Lethal as competitors in the tournament. On April 28, 2017 WCPW announced the first four wrestlers for the Japan qualifiers for the tournament which included Bushi, Kushida, Jushin Thunder Liger, and Hiromu Takahashi.

On May 22, 2017, WCPW announced that they would cancel several tapings for Loaded in Manchester, England scheduled for June 16, 2017, June 23, 2017, June 30, 2017, July 14, 2017, July 28, 2017, August 4, 2017, August 11, 2017, and August 18, 2017 and stated in the press release that their content on YouTube was deemed "non-advertiser friendly" after changes to the platform's guidelines were implemented due to a large number of advertisers pulling their ads from the platform after it was reported that ads for major companies were being played next to videos displaying extremist content. In response, WCPW announced Fight Back which addressed and protested against wrestling content on the platform being demonetized. Fight Back was held on June 2, 2017 at the Bowlers Exhibition Centre and aired the following day on YouTube. The show also featured a speech from WhatCulture personality Adam Blampied at the beginning of the event. After the show had aired, WCPW was issued a community guidelines strike which forced the event's broadcast to be taken down briefly by YouTube before being put back up after an appeal by the promotion.

=== Storylines ===
The Pro Wrestling World Cup Qualifiers featured professional wrestling matches that involves different wrestlers from pre-existing scripted feuds and storylines. Wrestlers portrayed villains, heroes, or less distinguishable characters in scripted events that built tension and culminated in a wrestling match or series of matches. Storylines were produced on WhatCulture Pro Wrestling's various events and on their weekly internet show WCPW Loaded.

=== Venues ===
Dates	Venue	City	Qualifier
March 21	Harvey Hadden Sports Village	Nottingham, England	English
March 23	Motherwell Concert Hall	Motherwell, Scotland	Scottish
April 30	Planet Ice Coventry	Coventry, England	Mexican
May 14	Phoenix Concert Theatre	Toronto, Ontario, Canada	Canadian
July 2	Huxleys Neue Welt	Berlin, Germany	German
July 7	Bowlers Exhibition Centre	Manchester, England	Japanese
July 21	Bowlers Exhibition Centre	Manchester, England	USA
July 22	Domain	Newcastle Upon Tyne, England	Rest of the world

=== Participants ===
Wrestler	Country
Alberto El Patron	Mexico
Angelico	Mexico
Bad Bones	Germany
Bobby Fish	USA
Brent Banks	Canada
BT Gunn	Scotland
Bushi	Japan
Cash Money Erkan	Germany
Cem Kaplan	Germany
Da Mack	Germany
David Starr	USA
Drago	Mexico
Drew Galloway	Scotland
El Hijo de Dos Caras	Mexico
El Ligero	England
Franky The Mobster	Canada
Harry Smith	Canada
Hiromu Takahashi	Japan
Icarus	Hungary
James Storm	USA
Jay Lethal	USA
Jimmy Havoc	England
Joe Coffey	Scotland
Joseph Conners	England
Jurn Simmons	Netherlands
Jushin Thunder Liger	Japan
Juvenile X	Germany
Juventud Guerrera	Mexico
Keith Lee	USA
Kenny Williams	Scotland
Kushida	Japan
Kyle O'Reilly	Canada
Lewis Girvan	Scotland
Liam Thomson	Scotland
Lucky Kid	Germany
Mark Coffey	Scotland
Mark Davis	Australia
Martin Kirby	England
Marty Scurll	England
Matt Sydal	USA
Michael Elgin	Canada
Mike Bailey	Canada
Moose	USA
Flash Morgan Webster	Wales
Nick Aldis	England
Pascal Spalter	Germany
Penta El Zero M	Mexico
Rambo	Dominican Republic
Rampage	England
Rene Dupree	Canada
Rey Fenix	Mexico
Rey Mysterio	Mexico
Ricochet	USA
RJ Singh	England
Ryusuke Taguchi	Japan
Sho Tanaka	Japan
Tiger Mask	Japan
Tom LaRuffa	France
Travis Banks	New Zealand
Tyson Dux	Canada
Yohei Komatsu	Japan
Zack Gibson	England
Zack Sabre Jr.	England

== Results ==
Other on-screen personnel
Role:	Name:
Commentators	Dave Bradshaw
Commentators	Matt Striker
Commentators	James R. Kennedy
Commentators	Sean David
Commentators	Stu Bennett
Commentators	Alex Shane
Ring announcer	Stevie Aaron
Ring announcer	Ryan Devlin

English Qualifier - March 21, 2017
No.	Results	Stipulations
1	Will Ospreay defeated Martin Kirby by pinfall	Pro Wrestling World Cup English qualifier first round match
2	Rampage defeated Nick Aldis by pinfall	Pro Wrestling World Cup English qualifier first round match
3	Liam Slater and Matt Riddle defeated Prospect (Alex Gracie and Lucas Archer)	Tag team match
4	Zack Sabre Jr. defeated Marty Scurll by pinfall	Pro Wrestling World Cup English qualifier first round match
5	Jimmy Havoc defeated Zack Gibson by pinfall	Pro Wrestling World Cup English qualifier first round match
6	Christopher Daniels (c) defeated El Ligero by pinfall	Singles match for the ROH World Championship
7	Drew Galloway defeated Ricochet by pinfall	Singles match
8	Will Ospreay defeated Rampage	Pro Wrestling World Cup English qualifier final round match
9	Zack Sabre Jr. defeated Jimmy Havoc by pinfall	Pro Wrestling World Cup English qualifier final match
10	The Prestige (BT Gunn, Joe Coffey, Joe Hendry, and Travis Banks) defeated Bullet Club (Adam Cole, Matt Jackson, and Nick Jackson) and Gabriel Kidd by pinfall	Eight-man tag team match
(c) / – the champion(s) heading into the match

Scottish Qualifier - March 23, 2017
No.	Results	Stipulations
1	Kenny Williams defeated Joe Hendry by pinfall	Pro Wrestling World Cup Scottish qualifier first round match
2	Joe Coffey defeated Liam Thomson by pinfall	Pro Wrestling World Cup Scottish qualifier first round match
3	Grado defeated El Ligero by pinfall	Singles match
4	BT Gunn defeated Lewis Girvan by pinfall	Pro Wrestling World Cup Scottish qualifier first round match
5	Drew Galloway defeated Mark Coffey by pinfall	Pro Wrestling World Cup Scottish qualifier first round match
6	Martin Kirby defeated Travis Banks by pinfall	Singles match
7	Joe Coffey defeated Kenny Williams by pinfall	Pro Wrestling World Cup Scottish qualifier final round match
8	Drew Galloway defeated BT Gunn by pinfall	Pro Wrestling World Cup Scottish qualifier final round match
9	Marty Scurll defeated Matt Riddle and Will Ospreay by pinfall	Three-way match

Mexican Qualifier - April 30, 2017
No.	Results	Stipulations
1^{D}	Prospect (Alex Gracie and Lucas Archer) defeated The Hunter Brothers (Jim Hunter and Lee Hunter) by pinfall	Tag team match
2	Penta El Zero M defeated Rey Fenix by pinfall	Pro Wrestling World Cup Mexican qualifier first round match
3	El Ligero defeated Drago by pinfall	Pro Wrestling World Cup Mexican qualifier first round match
4	Primate defeated Scott Wainwright (with Bea Priestley) by pinfall	Hardcore match
5	Rey Mysterio defeated Alberto El Patron by pinfall	Pro Wrestling World Cup Mexican qualifier first round match
6	Juventud Guerrera defeated El Hijo de Dos Caras by pinfall	Singles match
7	Cody Rhodes defeated Drew Galloway by pinfall	Singles match
8	Penta El Zero M defeated El Ligero by pinfall	Pro Wrestling World Cup Mexican qualifier final round match
9	Rey Mysterio defeated Juventud Guerrera by pinfall	Pro Wrestling World Cup Mexican qualifier final round match
10	Joe Hendry defeated Martin Kirby (c) by referee decision	Singles match for the WCPW World Championship
(c) / – the champion(s) heading into the match; D / – this was a dark match

Canadian Qualifier - May 14, 2017
No.	Results	Stipulations
1^{D}	Martin Kirby defeated Tarik by pinfall	Singles match
2^{D}	Buck Gunderson (c) defeated Kevin Blackwood by pinfall	Singles match for the VCW Openweight Championship
3	Michael Elgin defeated Rene Dupree by disqualification	Singles match
4	Harry Smith defeated Franky The Mobster by pinfall	Pro Wrestling World Cup Canadian qualifier first round match
5	Mike Bailey defeated Brent Banks by pinfall	Pro Wrestling World Cup Canadian qualifier first round match
6	Kyle O'Reilly defeated Tyson Dux by pinfall	Pro Wrestling World Cup Canadian qualifier first round match
7	Kushida defeated Will Ospreay by pinfall	Pro Wrestling World Cup final match
8	Gabriel Kidd (c) defeated Zack Sabre Jr. by pinfall	Singles match for the WCPW Internet Championship
9	Michael Elgin defeated Harry Smith by pinfall	Pro Wrestling World Cup Canadian qualifier final match
10	Mike Bailey defeated Kyle O'Reilly by pinfall	Pro Wrestling World Cup Canadian qualifier final match
11	Joe Hendry defeated El Ligero by pinfall	Singles match
(c) / – the champion(s) heading into the match; D / – this was a dark match

Japanese Qualifier - July 7, 2017
No.	Results	Stipulations
1	Ryusuke Taguchi defeated Jushin Thunder Liger by pinfall	Pro Wrestling World Cup Japanese qualifier first round match
2	Hiromu Takahashi defeated Yohei Komatsu by pinfall	Pro Wrestling World Cup Japanese qualifier first round match
3	Bushi defeated Tiger Mask by pinfall	Pro Wrestling World Cup Japanese qualifier first round match
4	Kushida defeated Sho Tanaka by pinfall	Pro Wrestling World Cup Japanese qualifier first round match
5	Hiromu Takahashi defeated Ryusuke Taguchi by pinfall	Pro Wrestling World Cup Japanese qualifier final round match
6	Kushida defeated Bushi by pinfall	Pro Wrestling World Cup Japanese qualifier final round match
7	Tomohiro Ishii defeated Rampage by pinfall	Singles match

German Qualifier - July 21, 2017
No.	Results	Stipulations
1	Cash Money Erkan defeated Rambo by pinfall	Pro Wrestling World Cup German qualifier first round match
2	Bad Bones defeated Pascal Spalter by pinfall	Pro Wrestling World Cup German qualifier first round match
3	Da Mack defeated Cem Kaplan by pinfall	Pro Wrestling World Cup German qualifier first round match
4	Lucky Kid defeated Juvenile X by pinfall	Pro Wrestling World Cup German qualifier first round match
5	The Hunter Brothers (Jim Hunter and Lee Hunter) defeated Ronaldo Shaqiri and Toni Harting by pinfall	Tag team match
6	Gabriel Kidd (c) defeated Joe Coffey by pinfall	Singles match for the WCPW Internet Championship
7	Primate defeated Joe Hendry (c) by disqualification	Singles match for the WCPW World Championship
8	Alex Gracie defeated Kenny Williams by pinfall	Singles match
9	Lucky Kid defeated Da Mack by pinfall	Pro Wrestling World Cup German qualifier final round match
10	Bad Bones defeated Cash Money Erkan by pinfall	Pro Wrestling World Cup German qualifier final round match
(c) / – the champion(s) heading into the match

USA Qualifier - July 21, 2017
No.	Results	Stipulations
1	David Starr defeated Bobby Fish by pinfall	Pro Wrestling World Cup USA qualifier first round match
2	Jay Lethal defeated Moose by pinfall	Pro Wrestling World Cup USA qualifier first round match
3	Keith Lee defeated James Storm by pinfall	Pro Wrestling World Cup USA qualifier first round match
4	Ricochet defeated Matt Sydal by pinfall	Pro Wrestling World Cup USA qualifier first round match
5	Jay Lethal defeated David Starr by pinfall	Pro Wrestling World Cup USA qualifier final round match
6	Ricochet defeated Keith Lee by pinfall	Pro Wrestling World Cup USA qualifier final round match

Rest of the world qualifier - July 22, 2017
No.	Results	Stipulations
1	Travis Banks defeated Mark Davis by pinfall	Pro Wrestling World Cup rest of the world qualifier first round match
2	Jurn Simmons defeated Tom LaRuffa by pinfall	Pro Wrestling World Cup Rest of the world qualifier first round match
3	Morgan Webster defeated RJ Singh by pinfall	Pro Wrestling World Cup Rest of the World qualifier first round match
4	Angélico defeated Icarus by pinfall	Pro Wrestling World Cup Rest of the world qualifier first round match
5	Travis Banks defeated Jurn Simmons by pinfall	Pro Wrestling World Cup Rest of the world qualifier first round match
6	Angélico defeated Morgan Webster by pinfall	Pro Wrestling World Cup Rest of the world qualifier final round match
