= Pro Wrestling World Cup =

- Promotion: WhatCulture Pro Wrestling
- Date: August 23, 2017–August 26, 2017
- City: Night 1: Milton Keynes, England; Night 2: Manchester, England; Night 3: Newcastle Upon Tyne, England
- Venue: Night 1: Planet Ice Arena Milton Keynes; Night 2: Bowlers Exhibition Centre; Night 3: Sport Central

WhatCulture Pro Wrestling event chronology
← Previous; Stacked	Next → Refuse to Lose

The Pro Wrestling World Cup was a professional wrestling tournament and livestreaming event produced by WhatCulture Pro Wrestling (WCPW) which took place on August 23, 2017 at Planet Ice Arena Milton Keynes in Milton Keynes, England, August 24, 2017 at the Bowlers Exhibition Centre in Manchester, England, and August 26, 2017 at Sport Central in Newcastle Upon Tyne, England. All three nights of the tournament were streamed live on YouTube.

== Production ==
=== Background ===
On February 13, 2017, WCPW announced the Pro Wrestling World Cup, a 64-man single elimination tournament with various qualifying matches taking place from March 21-July 22, 2017 in Nottingham, England, Motherwell, Scotland, Toronto, Ontario, Canada, Berlin, Germany, and Manchester, England. The finals were also announced to take place on August 23, 2017 at Planet Ice Milton Keynes in Milton Keynes, England, August 24, 2017 at the Bowlers Exhibition Centre in Manchester, England, and August 26, 2017 at Sport Central in Newcastle Upon Tyne, England and would feature Rey Mysterio, Jr., Kenny Williams, Kushida, Ricochet, Will Ospreay, Mike Bailey, Angelico, Hiromu Takahashi, Penta El Zero M, and Jay Lethal as competitors in the tournament.

On May 22, 2017, WCPW announced that they would cancel several tapings for Loaded in Manchester, England scheduled for June 16, 2017, June 23, 2017, June 30, 2017, July 14, 2017, July 28, 2017, August 4, 2017, August 11, 2017, and August 18, 2017 and stated in the press release that their content on YouTube was deemed "non-advertiser friendly" after changes to the platform's guidelines were implemented due to a large number of advertisers pulling their ads from the platform after it was reported that ads for major companies were being played next to videos displaying extremist content. In response, WCPW announced Fight Back which addressed and protested against wrestling content on the platform being demonetized. Fight Back was held on June 2, 2017 at the Bowlers Exhibition Centre and aired the following day on YouTube. The show also featured a speech from WhatCulture personality Adam Blampied at the beginning of the event. After the show had aired, WCPW was issued a community guidelines strike which forced the event's broadcast to be taken down briefly by YouTube before being put back up after an appeal by the promotion.

=== Storylines ===
The Pro Wrestling World Cup featured professional wrestling matches that involves different wrestlers from pre-existing scripted feuds and storylines. Wrestlers portrayed villains, heroes, or less distinguishable characters in scripted events that built tension and culminated in a wrestling match or series of matches. Storylines were produced on WhatCulture Pro Wrestling's various events and on their weekly internet show WCPW Loaded.

=== Participants ===
Wrestler	Country
Angelico	Mexico
Bad Bones	Germany
Hiromu Takahashi	Japan
Jay Lethal	USA
Joe Coffey	Scotland
Joseph Conners	England
Kenny Williams	Scotland
Kushida	Japan
Lucky Kid	Germany
Mike Bailey	Canada
Penta El Zero M	Mexico
Rey Mysterio	Mexico
Ricochet	USA
Travis Banks	New Zealand
Will Ospreay	England

== Results ==
Other on-screen personnel
Role:	Name:
Commentators	Dave Bradshaw
Commentators	James R. Kennedy
Commentators	Alex Shane
Ring announcer	Stevie Aaron
Ring announcer	Ryan Devlin

Night 1 - August 23, 2017
No.	Results	Stipulations
1^{D}	Primate defeated David Starr by pinfall	Singles match
2	Mike Bailey defeated Travis Banks by pinfall	Pro Wrestling World Cup first round match
3	Penta El Zero M defeated Bad Bones by pinfall	Pro Wrestling World Cup first round match
4	Marty Scurll and War Machine (Hanson and Ray Rowe) defeated The Prestige (BT Gunn, El Ligero, and Joe Hendry) by pinfall	Six-man tag team match
5	Hiromu Takahashi defeated Lucky Kid (with Tarkan Aslan) by pinfall	Pro Wrestling World Cup first round match
6	Ricochet defeated Angélico by pinfall	Pro Wrestling World Cup first round match
7	Joseph Conners defeated Joe Coffey by pinfall	Pro Wrestling World Cup first round match
8	Kushida defeated Kenny Williams by pinfall	Pro Wrestling World Cup first round match
9	Zack Sabre Jr. defeated Jay Lethal by pinfall	Pro Wrestling World Cup first round match
10	Will Ospreay defeated Rey Mysterio by pinfall	Pro Wrestling World Cup first round match
D / – this was a dark match

Night 2 - August 24, 2017
No.	Results	Stipulations
1	Ricochet defeated Penta El Zero M by pinfall	Pro Wrestling World Cup quarter-final match
2	Joseph Conners defeated Hiromu Takahashi by pinfall	Pro Wrestling World Cup quarter-final match
3	Will Ospreay defeated Mike Bailey by pinfall	Pro Wrestling World Cup quarter-final match
4	Kushida defeated Zack Sabre Jr. by pinfall	Pro Wrestling World Cup quarter-final match

Night 3 - August 26, 2017
No.	Results	Stipulations
1	Kushida defeated Joseph Conners by pinfall	Pro Wrestling World Cup semi-final match
2	Will Ospreay defeated Ricochet by pinfall	Pro Wrestling World Cup semi-final match
3	Penta El Zero M defeated Mike Bailey by pinfall	Singles match
4	El Ligero defeated Rampage by pinfall	Magnificient 7 briefcase match
5	Zack Sabre Jr. defeated Alex Gracie by pinfall	WCPW Internet Championship #1 contendership match
6	Joe Hendry (c) defeated Jack Swagger by pinfall	Singles match for the WCPW World Championship
7	Kushida defeated Will Ospreay by pinfall	Pro Wrestling World Cup final match
(c) / – the champion(s) heading into the match
