= Refuse to Lose (2016) =

2016 WhatCulture Pro Wrestling pay-per-view event

- Promotion: WhatCulture Pro Wrestling
- Date: October 6, 2016
- City: Newcastle Upon Tyne, England
- Venue: Northumbria University
- Attendance: 1,000

WhatCulture Pro Wrestling event chronology
← Previous; Built to Destroy	Next → True Legacy

Refuse to Lose was a professional wrestling pay-per-view event produced by WhatCulture Pro Wrestling (WCPW). It took place on October 6, 2016 at Northumbria University in Newcastle Upon Tyne, England and was streamed live on FITE TV.

== Production ==
=== Background ===
On May 25, 2016, WhatCulture announced on their website and their Twitter account that they would be starting their own professional wrestling promotion called WhatCulture Pro Wrestling (WCPW). The first event was announced to take place on June 16, 2016 at Warehouse 34 in Newcastle upon Tyne, England and was titled Built to Destroy. However, due to increasing demand, a second show the night before was scheduled which served as tapings for their weekly YouTube show Loaded and featured Simon Miller and Ross Tweddell as commentators for the first two episodes which aired on June 27, 2016 and July 4, 2016 respectively with the first episode featuring a #1 contendership match for the WCPW World Championship with Big Damo fighting Joe Hendry The second episode also featured Jay Lethal taking on El Ligero in a #1 contendership match for the ROH World Championship. Built to Destroy, which aired on July 25, 2016 also featured two championship matches. The first being Jay Lethal defending the ROH World Championship against Noam Dar and the second being Big Damo fighting Rampage to become the inaugural WCPW World Champion. On August 11, 2016, WCPW announced that their first pay-per-view titled Refuse to Lose would take place on October 6, 2016 at Northumbria University in Newcastle upon Tyne, England and would be streamed live on FITE TV. In addition to the announcement of Refuse to Lose, WCPW announced that 1996 Olympic Games gold medalist and multi-time WWE and Total Nonstop Action Wrestling champion Kurt Angle, Cody Rhodes, Jay Lethal, and El Ligero were scheduled to be featured wrestlers for the event along with commentary being provided by veteran wrestling commentators Jim Ross and Jim Cornette. WCPW also confirmed that Alberto El Patron, Joe Hendry, and Minoru Suzuki would be featured wrestlers at the event.

=== Storylines ===
Refuse to Lose featured professional wrestling matches that involves different wrestlers from pre-existing scripted feuds and storylines. Wrestlers portrayed villains, heroes, or less distinguishable characters in scripted events that built tension and culminated in a wrestling match or series of matches. Storylines were produced on WhatCulture Pro Wrestling's various events and on their weekly internet show WCPW Loaded.

== Results ==
Other on-screen personnel
Role:	Name:
Commentators	Jim Ross
Commentators	Jim Cornette
Commentators	Alex Shane
Ring announcer	Ryan Devlin
Referees	Steve Lynskey
Referees	Sean McLaughlin

No.	Results	Stipulations	Times
1	Minoru Suzuki (with El Desperado) defeated Joe Coffey by pinfall	Singles match	10:36
2	El Ligero defeated Alberto El Patron and Travis Banks by pinfall	Three-way match to crown the inaugural WCPW Internet Champion	7:36
3	Cody Rhodes defeated Doug Williams by pinfall	Singles match	9:05
4	Rampage defeated Adam Blampied (with Alex Gracie, Big Damo, Drake, James R. Kennedy, and Lucas Archer) by pinfall	Street fight	9:19
5	Nixon Newell (c) defeated Kimber Lee by pinfall	Singles match for the WCPW Women's Championship	6:54
6	Joseph Conners (c) defeated Martin Kirby by pinfall	Singles match for the WCPW World Championship	23:54
7	Kurt Angle defeated Joe Hendry by pinfall	Singles match	9:24
(c) / – the champion(s) heading into the match
