= WCPW Fight Back =

2017 WhatCulture Pro Wrestling pay-per-view event

Fight Back
- Promotion: WhatCulture Pro Wrestling
- Date: June 2, 2017 (aired June 3, 2017)
- City: Manchester, England
- Venue: Bowlers Exhibition Centre

WhatCulture Pro Wrestling event chronology
← Previous; HendryMania	Next → Built to Destroy

Fight Back was a professional wrestling streaming event produced by WhatCulture Pro Wrestling (WCPW). The event took place on June 2, 2017 at the Bowlers Exhibition Centre in Manchester, England and aired the following day on tape delay on YouTube as a protest against the platform's demonetization of professional wrestling content.

== Production ==
=== Background ===
On May 22, 2017, WCPW announced that they would cancel several tapings for their weekly show Loaded in Manchester, England scheduled for June 16, 2017, June 23, 2017, June 30, 2017, July 14, 2017, July 28, 2017, August 4, 2017, August 11, 2017, and August 18, 2017 and stated in the press release that their content on YouTube was deemed "non-advertiser friendly" after changes to the platform's guidelines were implemented due to a large number of advertisers pulling their ads from the platform after it was reported that ads for major companies were being played next to videos displaying extremist content. In response, WCPW announced Fight Back which addressed and protested against wrestling content on the platform being demonetized.

=== Storylines ===
Fight Back featured professional wrestling matches that involves different wrestlers from pre-existing scripted feuds and storylines. Wrestlers portrayed villains, heroes, or less distinguishable characters in scripted events that built tension and culminated in a wrestling match or series of matches. Storylines were produced on WhatCulture Pro Wrestling's various events and on their weekly internet show WCPW Loaded.

=== Aftermath ===
After the show had aired, WCPW was issued a community guidelines strike which forced the event's broadcast to be taken down briefly by YouTube before being put back up after an appeal by the promotion.

On September 19, 2017 WhatCulture announced on their Twitter account that Adam Pacitti, Adam Blampied, Sam Driver, Jack G. King, and Ross Tweddell, who were all key staff members for the company and the WCPW promotion, had all departed from the company. On September 30, 2017, WCPW announced that they would be rebranding to Defiant Wrestling after the 2017 Refuse to Lose pay-per-view on October 2, 2017 and tapings for Loaded on October 3, 2017 and that Wade Barrett was going to be the new on-screen general manager.

== Results ==
Other on-screen personnel
Role:	Name:
Commentators	Dave Bradshaw
Commentators	James R. Kennedy
Ring announcer	Ryan Devlin
Referees	Steve Lynskey

No.	Results	Stipulations	Times
1	Kay Lee Ray defeated Viper (with Bea Priestley) by pinfall	Singles match	6:13
2	BT Gunn defeated Mark Davis by pinfall	Singles match	9:10
3	Kenny Williams defeated Aaron Echo by pinfall	Singles match	7:48
4	Primate defeated Drake by pinfall	Hardcore match	9:11
5	Gabriel Kidd (c) defeated Zack Gibson by pinfall	Singles match for the WCPW Internet Championship	12:23
6	Prospect (Alex Gracie and Lucas Archer) defeated Johnny Moss and Liam Slater, Kid Fite and Lou King Sharp, Polo Promotions (Jackie Polo and Mark Coffey), and The Kings Of The North (Bonesaw & Damien Corvin)	WCPW Tag Team Championship #1 contendership gauntlet match	26:18
7	Rampage defeated Dave Mastiff, El Ligero, and Joe Coffey by pinfall	WCPW World Championship #1 contendership Four-way match	10:06
8	Joe Hendry (c) defeated Martin Kirby by pinfall	Singles match for the WCPW World Championship	23:13
(c) / – the champion(s) heading into the match
