= Defiant Wrestling =

British professional wrestling promotion

- Founded: May 2016; 10 years ago
- Defunct: 1 August 2019; 7 years ago
- Style: Professional wrestling
- Headquarters: Newcastle upon Tyne, England, U.K.
- Founder: WhatCulture
- Owner: WhatCulture
- Formerly: WhatCulture Pro Wrestling
- Website: https://wearedefiant.com/

Defiant Wrestling (Defiant), formerly known as WhatCulture Pro Wrestling (WCPW), was a British professional wrestling promotion based in Newcastle upon Tyne, England founded by the online entertainment news website, WhatCulture.

== History ==
WhatCulture Pro Wrestling logo used from 2016 to 2017

=== Early years (2014–2016) ===
On 11 December 2014, WhatCulture opened a new channel originally named WhatCulture WWE, now known as WhatCulture Wrestling, a YouTube channel focused on covering professional wrestling. On April 29, 2015, this channel introduced its first regular host, Adam Blampied. Overtime, personalities such Adam Pacitti, Kenny McIntosh, Sam Driver, Jack "The Jobber" G. King, "King" Ross Tweddell, Simon Miller, and others were introduced, and their popularity rose. The hosts began to include an on-air kayfabe storyline feud between Blampied and his followers, collectively known as B-X, versus Pacitti and his followers, collectively known as Pacitti Club.

=== Launch (2016–2017) ===
On 25 May 2015, WhatCulture announced on their website and their Twitter account that they would be starting their own professional wrestling promotion called WhatCulture Pro Wrestling (WCPW). The first event was announced to take place on 16 June 2016 at Warehouse 34 in Newcastle upon Tyne, England and was titled Built to Destroy. However, due to increasing demand, a second show the night before was scheduled which served as tapings for their weekly YouTube show Loaded and featured Simon Miller and Ross Tweddell as commentators for the first two episodes which aired on 27 June 2016 and 4 July 2016 respectively with the first episode featuring a #1 contendership match for the WCPW World Championship with Big Damo fighting Joe Hendry The second episode also featured Jay Lethal taking on El Ligero in a #1 contendership match for the ROH World Championship. Built to Destroy, which aired on 25 July 2016 also featured two championship matches. The first being Jay Lethal defending the ROH World Championship against Noam Dar and the second being Big Damo fighting Rampage to become the inaugural WCPW World Champion.

On 11 August 2016, WCPW announced that their first pay-per-view titled Refuse to Lose would take place on 6 October 2016 at Northumbria University in Newcastle upon Tyne, England and would be streamed live on FITE TV. In addition to the announcement of Refuse to Lose, WCPW announced that 1996 Olympic Games gold medalist and multi-time WWE and Total Nonstop Action Wrestling champion Kurt Angle, Cody Rhodes, Jay Lethal, and El Ligero were scheduled to be featured wrestlers for the event along with commentary being provided by veteran wrestling commentators Jim Ross and Jim Cornette. WCPW also confirmed that Alberto El Patron, Joe Hendry, and Minoru Suzuki would be featured wrestlers at the event. At Refuse to Lose, the first WCPW Internet Champion would also be crowned in a three way match between El Ligero, Alberto El Patron, and Travis Banks.

On 24 August 2016, WCPW taped a second special event at O2 Academy Newcastle in Newcastle upon Tyne, England. The special event, titled Stacked which aired on September 3, 2016, featured Big Damo defending the WCPW World Championship against Joe Hendry, Rampage, and Joseph Conners along with a last woman standing match between Nixon Newell and Bea Priestley to crown the inaugural WCPW Women's Champion.

On 30 November 2016, WCPW held their second pay-per-view at the Harvey Hadden Sports Village in Nottingham, England. Titled Delete WCPW, the event featured Cody Rhodes defending the GFW NEX*GEN Championship against El Ligero who defended the WCPW Internet Championship, Bully Ray fighting Matt Hardy, Will Ospreay vs. Martin Kirby in a best out of three falls match, and Joseph Conners defending the WCPW World Championship against Drew Galloway and Joe Hendry in a three way steel cage match.

=== Pro Wrestling World Cup, YouTube demonetization, and rebranding to Defiant (2017) ===
On 13 February 2017, WCPW announced the Pro Wrestling World Cup, a 64-man single elimination tournament with various qualifying matches taking place from 21 March–22 July 2017 in Nottingham, England, Motherwell, Scotland, Toronto, Ontario, Canada, Berlin, Germany, and Manchester, England. The finals were also announced to take place on August 23, 2017 at Planet Ice Milton Keynes in Milton Keynes, England, August 24, 2017 at the Bowlers Exhibition Centre in Manchester, England, and August 26, 2017 at Sport Central in Newcastle Upon Tyne, England and would feature Rey Mysterio, Jr., Kenny Williams, Kushida, Ricochet, Will Ospreay, Mike Bailey, Angelico, Hiromu Takahashi, Penta El Zero M, and Jay Lethal as competitors in the tournament.

On 22 May 2017, WCPW announced that they would cancel several tapings for Loaded in Manchester, England scheduled for 16 June 2017, 23 June 2017, 30 June 2017, 14 July 2017, 28 July 2017, 4 August 2017, 11 August 2017, and 18 August 2017 and stated in the press release that their content on YouTube was deemed "non-advertiser friendly" after changes to the platform's guidelines were implemented due to a large number of advertisers pulling their ads from the platform after it was reported that ads for major companies were being played next to videos displaying extremist content. In response, WCPW announced Fight Back which addressed and protested against wrestling content on the platform being demonetized. Fight Back was held on 2 June 2017 at the Bowlers Exhibition Centre and aired the following day on YouTube. The show also featured a speech from WhatCulture personality Adam Blampied at the beginning of the event. After the show had aired, WCPW was issued a community guidelines strike which forced the event's broadcast to be taken down briefly by YouTube before being put back up after an appeal by the promotion.

On 19 September 2017 WhatCulture announced on their Twitter account that Adam Pacitti, Adam Blampied, Sam Driver, Jack G. King, and Ross Tweddell, who were all key staff members for the company and the WCPW promotion, had all departed from the company. On 30 September 2017, WCPW announced that they would be rebranding to Defiant Wrestling after the 2017 Refuse to Lose pay-per-view on 2 October 2017 and tapings for Loaded on 3 October 2017 and that Wade Barrett was going to be the new on-screen general manager. The first show under the Defiant banner took place on 4 December 2017 at O2 Academy Newcastle during a pay-per-view titled #WeAreDefiant. On 4 December 2017, Austin Aries joined the Defiant Wrestling roster during the #WeAreDefiant pay-per-view.

=== Final years and closure (2017–2019) ===
After rebranding to Defiant, the promotion continued taping shows for their now-eponymous weekly show throughout 2017 and 2018. On the first episode of Defiant's eponymous weekly show, Austin Aries won the Defiant Championship after defeating Marty Scurll. On 20 September 20, Defiant announced that they would be bringing back Loaded with the first tapings taking place on 3 December 2018. The first episode of Defiant Loaded aired on 9 December 2019 and featured Walter defending the Defiant Internet Championship against El Phantasmo and Chris Ridgeway in a three way match. However, further episodes of Defiant's Loaded and shows mainly featured wrestlers from the British and European independent circuit with a few occasional international bookings.

On 1 June 2019, Defiant taped the final episodes of Loaded in Newcastle upon Tyne, England. The last episodes of Loaded would lead into their final show titled Built to Destroy 2019. On 1 August 2019, Defiant announced that they would be closing down effective immediately.

== Championships ==
Championship	Final champion(s)	Date won	Days held	Location
Defiant Hardcore Championship	Drake	June 29, 2019	33	Newcastle upon Tyne, England
Defiant Internet Championship	Joe Hendry	June 29, 2019	33	Newcastle upon Tyne, England
Defiant Tag Team Championship	Benji and Visage	June 29, 2019	33	Newcastle upon Tyne, England
Defiant Women's Championship	Lizzy Styles	April 17, 2019	106	Leeds, West Yorkshire, England
Defiant World Championship	David Starr	June 29, 2019	33	Newcastle upon Tyne, England
