= Defiant Loaded =

British professional wrestling streaming television programme

- Also known as: WCPW Loaded (2016–2017); Defiant (2017–2018)
- Genre: Professional wrestling
- Created by: Defiant Wrestling; WhatCulture
- Presented by: Dave Bradshaw; James R. Kennedy
- Starring: Defiant roster
- Country of origin: United Kingdom
- Original language: English
- No. of episodes: 72

Production
- Camera setup: Multicamera setup
- Running time: 60 minutes
- Production company: WhatCulture Ltd

Original release
- Network: YouTube
- Release: June 27, 2016 – June 23, 2019

Defiant Loaded, formerly WCPW Loaded and simply Defiant, is a British professional wrestling streaming television programme produced by Defiant Wrestling, a professional wrestling promotion owned by the entertainment news website WhatCulture Ltd. The program aired from June 27, 2016 to June 23, 2019 on the promotion's YouTube channel.

== History ==
WCPW Loaded logo used from 2016 to 2017

On May 25, 2016, WhatCulture announced on their website and their Twitter account that they would be starting their own professional wrestling promotion called WhatCulture Pro Wrestling (WCPW). The first event was announced to take place on June 16, 2016 at Warehouse 34 in Newcastle upon Tyne, England and was titled Built to Destroy. However, due to increasing demand, a second show the night before was scheduled which served as tapings for their weekly YouTube show Loaded and featured Simon Miller and Ross Tweddell as commentators for the first two episodes which aired on June 27, 2016 and July 4, 2016 respectively with the first episode featuring a #1 contendership match for the WCPW World Championship with Big Damo fighting Joe Hendry The second episode also featured Jay Lethal taking on El Ligero in a #1 contendership match for the ROH World Championship. On the 14th episode of Loaded which aired on October 29, 2016, Cody Rhodes challenged Joseph Conners for the WCPW World Championship.

On May 22, 2017, WCPW announced that they would cancel several tapings for Loaded in Manchester, England scheduled for June 16, 2017, June 23, 2017, June 30, 2017, July 14, 2017, July 28, 2017, August 4, 2017, August 11, 2017, and August 18, 2017 and stated in the press release that their content on YouTube was deemed "non-advertiser friendly" after changes to the platform's guidelines were implemented due to a large number of advertisers pulling their ads from the platform after it was reported that ads for major companies were being played next to videos displaying extremist content. In response, WCPW announced Fight Back which addressed and protested against wrestling content on the platform being demonetized. Fight Back was held on June 2, 2017 at the Bowlers Exhibition Centre and aired the following day on YouTube. The show also featured a speech from WhatCulture personality Adam Blampied at the beginning of the event. After the show had aired, WCPW was issued a community guidelines strike which forced the event's broadcast to be taken down briefly by YouTube before being put back up after an appeal by the promotion.

After rebranding to Defiant, the promotion continued taping shows for their now-eponymous weekly show throughout 2017 and 2018. On the first episode of Defiant's eponymous weekly show, Austin Aries won the Defiant Championship after defeating Marty Scurll. On September 20, 2018, Defiant announced that they would be bringing back Loaded with the first tapings taking place on December 3, 2018. The first episode of Defiant Loaded aired on December 9, 2019 and featured Walter defending the Defiant Internet Championship against El Phantasmo and Chris Ridgeway in a three way match. However, further episodes of Defiant's Loaded and shows mainly featured wrestlers from the British and European independent circuit with a few occasional international bookings.

On June 1, 2019, Defiant taped the final episodes of Loaded in Newcastle upon Tyne, England. The last episodes of Loaded would lead into their final show titled Built to Destroy 2019.
