= Defiant World Championship =

British wrestling championship

Details
- Promotion: Defiant Wrestling
- Date established: June 16, 2016
- Date retired: August 1, 2019

Other name
- WCPW World Championship
Statistics
- Longest reign: Rampage
- Shortest reign: Martin Kirby
- Oldest champion: Austin Aries
- Youngest champion: Joe Hendry

The Defiant World Championship, formerly the WCPW World Championship, was a professional wrestling championship created and promoted by Defiant Wrestling, formerly WhatCulture Pro Wrestling (WCPW).

== Title history ==
Key

No.	Overall reign number
Reign	Reign number for the specific champion
Days	Number of days held

No.	Wrestler	Reign	Date	Days held	Venue	Location	Event	Notes	Ref.
1	Big Damo	1	August 16, 2016	69	Warehouse 34	Newcastle Upon Tyne, England	Built to Destroy 2016		
2	Joseph Conners	1	August 24, 2016	98	Warehouse 34	Newcastle Upon Tyne, England	Stacked		
3	Drew Galloway	1	November 30, 2016	150	Harvey Hadden Sports Village	Nottingham, England	Delete WCPW		
4	Martin Kirby	1	April 29, 2017	1	Sport Central	Newcastle Upon Tyne, England	No Regrets 2017		
5	Joe Hendry	1	April 30, 2017	155	Planet Ice Coventry	Coventry, England	Pro Wrestling World Cup Mexican Qualifier		
6	Marty Scurll	1	October 2, 2017	64	Northumbria University	Newcastle Upon Tyne, England	Refuse to Lose 2017		
7	Austin Aries	1	December 5, 2017	144	O2 Academy Birmingham	Birmingham, England	Defiant		
8	Rampage	1	April 24, 2018	322	Northumbria University	Newcastle Upon Tyne, England	No Regrets 2018		
9	Rory Coyle	1	March 16, 2019	32	The Point	Sunderland, England	Magnificent Seven		
10	Rampage	2	April 17, 2019	73	O2 Academy Leeds	Leeds, England	Lights Out 2019		
11	David Starr	1	June 29, 2019	33	Northumbria University	Newcastle Upon Tyne, England	Built to Destroy 2019		

== Combined reigns ==
Rank	Wrestler	No. of reigns	Combined days
1	Austin Aries	1	144
2	Big Damo	1	69
3	David Starr	1	33
4	Drew Galloway	1	150
5	Joe Hendry	1	155
6	Joseph Conners	1	98
7	Martin Kirby	1	1
8	Rampage	2	395
9	Rory Coyle	1	32
