= El Ligero =

British professional wrestler

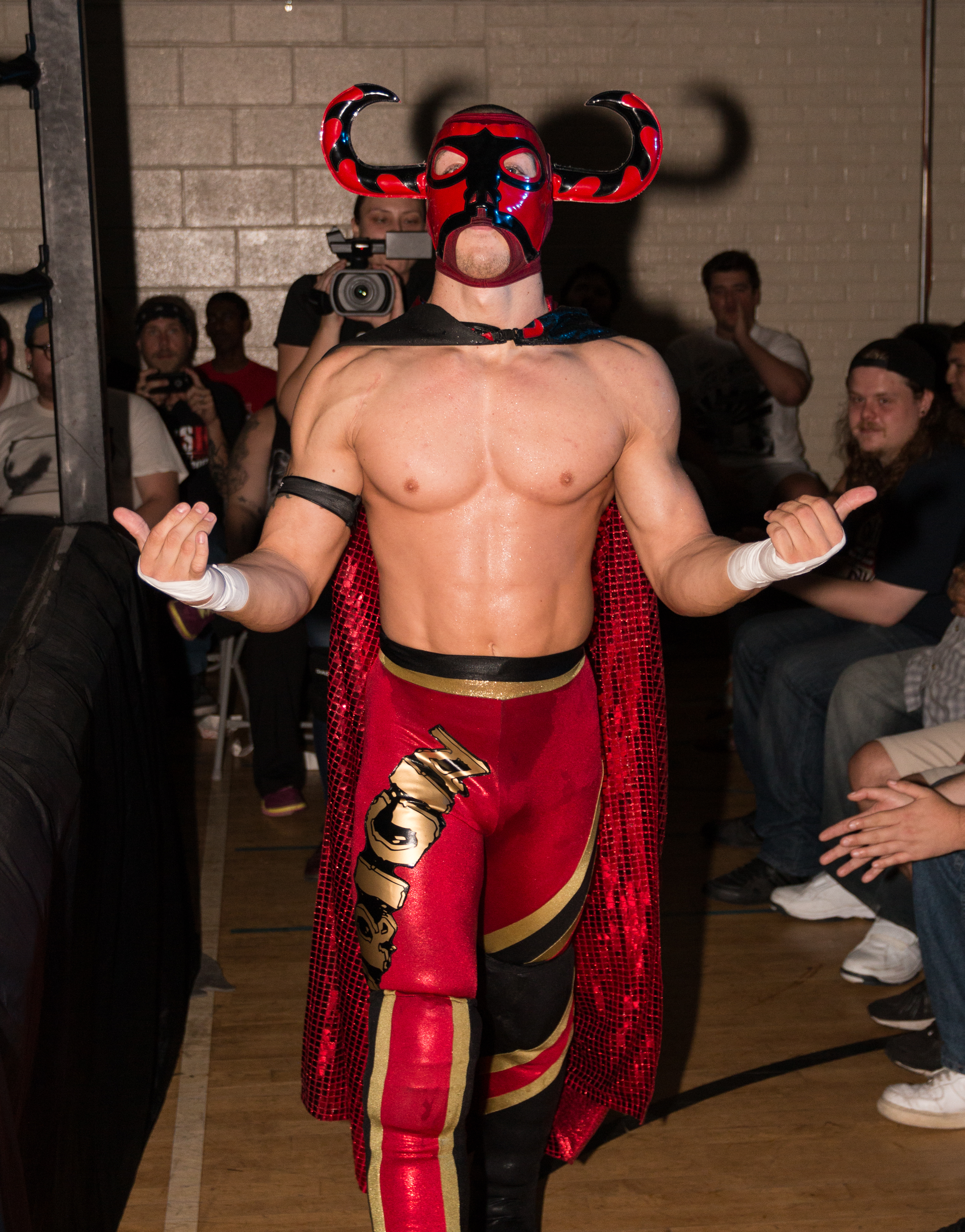
- El Ligero in 2016

Personal information
- Born: Simon Musk; 1 July 1985 (age 41) Leeds, West Yorkshire, England

Professional wrestling career
- Ring name(s): El Ligero; El Ligero Kraze; Elf Ligero; Faceless #3; Ligero; Negras Ligero; Prestige El Ligero; Regular El Ligero
- Billed height: 5-ft 8 in
- Billed weight: 160 lb (73 kg)
- Billed from: Leeds, England; Los Sanchos, Mexico
- Trained by: Alan Johnson; Johnny Moss
- Debut: 9 February 2002

Simon Musk (born 1 July 1985) is an English former professional wrestler better known under his in-ring persona of masked Mexican luchador, El Ligero (or simply Ligero). He is best known for his time in the British independent circuit, most notably New Generation Wrestling (NGW), What Culture Pro Wrestling (WCPW) and Preston City Wrestling (PCW). He is also known for his time in WWE, on their NXT UK brand.

== Professional wrestling career ==
=== Independent circuit (2002–2018, 2019–2020) ===
El Ligero has been a professional wrestler since February 2002.

In 2010, El Ligero appeared for Insane Championship Wrestling, entering a tournament to become the inaugural ICW Zero-G Champion but was unsuccessful.

At WCPW: Refuse to Lose, Ligero became the inaugural WCPW Internet Champion before losing it 55 days later to Cody Rhodes in a match where the GFW NEX*GEN Championship was also on the line.

On 20 October 2016, it was announced that Ligero would take part at the taping of the British professional wrestling promotion World of Sport Wrestling. He only made one appearance for World of Sport, on the inaugural show on 1 November 2016, where he won a singles match against Zack Gibson and later that night competed in a battle royal.

=== Pro Wrestling Noah (2008) ===
On 21 June 2008, El Ligero took part in an exclusive British six-man tag team match, on the pre-show of Pro Wrestling Noah's UK event at the Coventry Skydome. The team of Hubba-Bubba Lucha (El Ligero and Bubblegum) along with Luke "Dragon" Phoenix defeated Zack Sabre Jr., Dave Moralez and Mark Haskins.

=== Preston City Wrestling (2011–2016) ===
In August 2011, Ligero appeared on the inaugural Preston City Wrestling (PCW) card, beating Prince Ameen in a first round match in the PCW title tournament. Later that night, a storyline injury caused by Lionheart and Noam Dar took him out of the second show and the rest of the tournament, his place being taken by Kris Travis. Ligero would continue to make appearances in PCW over the next several years. His run there included a singles match against future WWE star Akira Tozawa on 2 June 2012, which Ligero won.

On 31 October 2015 at Fright Night 4, Ligero defeated Bubblegum for the PCW Cruiserweight title. He lost the belt a month later on 27 November 2015 at Supershow of Honor 2 – Show 1 to Adam Cole in an elimination 3-way match which also featured Bubblegum. He subsequently failed to regain the title from Bubblegum in a four way dance also including Danny Hope and Joey Hayes, and left the promotion shortly afterwards.

=== Progress Wrestling (2012–2019) ===
Ligero appeared on the debut show for England-based promotion Progress Wrestling and spent the first four events pursuing the Progress Champion, Nathan Cruz. Ligero eventually won the title at Chapter Four: the Ballad of El Ligero in November 2012. He dropped the title to Rampage Brown at Chapter Eight and disappeared from the promotion. He would make sporadic returns through 2019 which included two reigns with the PROGRESS Tag Team Championships with his partner Nathan Cruz.

=== WWE (2018–2020) ===
On 16 May 2018 it was revealed that El Ligero, wrestling under the ring name Ligero, would be one of 16 men competing in a one-night tournament to face Pete Dunne for the WWE United Kingdom Championship. He would lose to Travis Banks in the first round. Over Instagram, Ligero revealed he signed a UK deal with WWE. On 24 October edition of NXT UK, he would take on "Wild Boar" Mike Hitchman in a winning effort. At the January 2019 tapings, he won both his matches, one of which was against Mark Andrews. At the February tapings Ligero defeated Joseph Conners. At WWE Worlds Collide that was filmed over WrestleMania 35 weekend, he defeated NXT's Albert Hardie Jr. and 205 Live's Gran Metalik in a triple threat match. On 14 May, he debuted on the Cruiserweight brand 205 Live, in a match against WWE Cruiserweight Champion Tony Nese. He would lose the match, and be attacked by Nese's rival Ariya Daivari after the match.

== Sexual assault allegations ==
As part of the Speaking Out movement, Ligero was accused of indecent assault, sending inappropriate messages, and engaging in inappropriate conduct. While he denied the indecent assault allegation, he admitted that he did send inappropriate messages and engaged in inappropriate conduct. Following the allegations, Ligero would be released by Progress Wrestling and WWE.

== Championships and accomplishments ==
- 3 Count Wrestling
  - 3CW Triple Crown Championship (2 times)
- 4 Front Wrestling
  - 4 Front Wrestling Heavyweight Championship (1 time)
- Anglian Championship Wrestling
  - ACW Light Heavyweight Championship (1 time)
- Attack! Pro Wrestling
  - Kris Travis Tag Team Invitational Tournament (2017) – with Martin Kirby
- All-Star Wrestling
  - Regional Heaven Championship (1 time)
- British Hybrid Wrestling
  - BHW Championship (1 time)
- British Real Attitude Wrestling League
  - BRAWL Cruiserweight Championship (1 time)
- Frontier Championship Wrestling
  - FCW Championship (1 time)
- Gerry Norton Promotions
  - GNP Tag Team Championship (1 time) – with Cameron Kraze
- Grand Pro Wrestling
  - GPW British Championship (1 time)
  - Crazy Cruiser 8 (2013)
- HOPE Wrestling
  - HOPE Kings Of Flight Championship (3 times)
- Infinite Promotions
  - Infinite Promotions Tag Team Championship (1 time) – with Bubblegum
  - Infinite Promotions Tag Team Championship Tournament (2014) – with Bubblegum
- New Breed Wrestling Association
  - NBWA Heavyweight Championship (1 time)
- New Generation Wrestling
  - NGW Undisputed Championship (1 time)
  - NGW Tag Team Championship (1 time) – with Dara Diablo
  - NGW Tag Team Championship Tournament (2011) – with Dara Diablo
  - Winner of the Goole Trophy (1 time)
- North East Wrestling Society
  - NEWS British Championship (1 time)
  - NEWS British Championship Tournament
- Northern Wrestling League
  - NWL Elite Tag Team Championship (1 time) – with Bubblegum
- Norton British Wrestling
  - NBW Cruiserweight Championship (1 time)
- One Pro Wrestling
  - 1PW Tag Team Championship (1 time) – with Bubblegum
- Premier British Wrestling
  - PBW Heavyweight Championship (1 time)
  - King of Cruisers (2010)
- Preston City Wrestling
  - PCW Cruiserweight Championship (1 time)
- Phoenix Pro Wrestling
  - PPW Championship (1 time, inaugural)
  - PPW Championship Tournament (2011)
- Power Trip Wrestling
  - PTW Heavyweight Championship (1 time)
- Progress Wrestling
  - Progress Championship (1 time)
  - Progress Tag Team Championship (2 times) – with Nathan Cruz, Danny Garnell & Damon Moser (1) and Nathan Cruz (1)
- Pro Wrestling Chaos
  - Knights Of Chaos Championship (1 time) – with Martin Kirby
- Pro Wrestling Illustrated
  - Ranked No. 235 of the top 500 singles wrestlers in the PWI 500 in 2018
- Real Deal Wrestling
  - RDW European Championship (1 time)
  - RDW Lightweight Championship (1 time)
  - RDW Lincolnshire Regional Championship (1 time)
  - RDW Tag Team Championship (1 time) – with Martin Kirby
  - Blitz League (2008)
  - Money in the Bank (2008)
- SAS Wrestling
  - SAS Tag Team Championship (1 time) – with Bubblegum
- Southside Wrestling Entertainment
  - SWE Heavyweight Championship (1 time)
  - SWE Speed King Championship (1 time)
  - SWE Tag Team Championship (1 time) – with Joseph Conners
  - Speed King (2015)
- Swiss Wrestling Entertainment
  - SWE Championship (1 time)
- Tidal Championship Wrestling
  - TCW Championship (2 times)
- Triple X Wrestling
  - TWX Ax Championship (1 time)
  - TWX Crush Championship (1 time)
- UK Wrestling
  - UK Wrestling TV Championship (1 time)
- WhatCulture Pro Wrestling
  - WCPW Internet Championship (1 time, inaugural)
  - Magnificent 7 (2017) Briefecase^{1}
- WrestlingKULT
  - International Cult Cup Championship (1 time)
- X Wrestling Alliance
  - XWA Flyweight Championship (3 times)

^{1}Defeated Martin Kirby at Build to Destroy (2017) to win the Magnificent 7 (2017) Briefcase.

=== Luchas de Apuestas record ===
Winner (wager)	Loser (wager)	Location	Event	Date	Notes
El Ligero (mask)	Martin Kirby (pride)	Newcastle upon Tyne, England	WCPW Built To Destroy	16 June 2016	Kirby lost therefore he had to wear a dress.
