= Defiant Internet Championship =

British wrestling championship

Details
- Promotion: Defiant Wrestling
- Date established: June 16, 2016
- Date retired: August 1, 2019

Other name
- WCPW World Championship
Statistics
- Longest reign: Martin Kirby
- Shortest reign: Joe Hendry
- Oldest champion: El Ligero
- Youngest champion: Gabriel Kidd

The Defiant Internet Championship, formerly the WCPW Internet Championship, was a professional wrestling championship created and promoted by Defiant Wrestling, formerly WhatCulture Pro Wrestling (WCPW).

== Title history ==
Key

No.	Overall reign number
Reign	Reign number for the specific champion
Days	Number of days held

No.	Wrestler	Reign	Date	Days held	Venue	Location	Event	Notes	Ref.
1	El Ligero	1	October 6, 2016	55	Northumbria University	Newcastle Upon Tyne, England	Refuse to Lose		
2	Cody Rhodes	1	November 30, 2016	150	Harvey Hadden Sports Village	Nottingham, England	Delete WCPW	Won in a match in which Cody Rhodes also defended the GFW NEX*GEN Championship	
3	Gabriel Kidd	1	April 29, 2017	118	Sport Central	Newcastle upon Tyne, England	No Regrets		
4	Zack Sabre Jr.	1	August 25, 2017	173	The Plug	Sheffield, England	WCPW Loaded	Aired on tape delay on September 21, 2017	
–	Vacated		February 14, 2018					The title was vacated in 2018 because Zack Sabre Jr. stopped defending it.	
6	Travis Banks	1	February 19, 2018	98	Bowlers Exhibition Centre	Manchester, England	Defiant	Aired on tape delay on February 23, 2018; Won in a four-way elimination match	
7	Walter	1	May 28, 2018	189	The Plug	Sheffield, England	Road to Destruction	Aired on tape delay on June 2, 2018; Defeated Travis Banks and Zack Sabre Jr. in a three-way match	
8	Martin Kirby	1	December 3, 2018	189	Warehouse 34	Newcastle upon Tyne, England	Defiant Loaded	Aired on tape delay on December 30, 2018	
10	Joe Hendry	1	June 29, 2019	33	Northumbria University	Newcastle upon Tyne, England	Built to Destroy 2019		
