= Joe Hendry =

Scottish professional wrestler (born 1988)

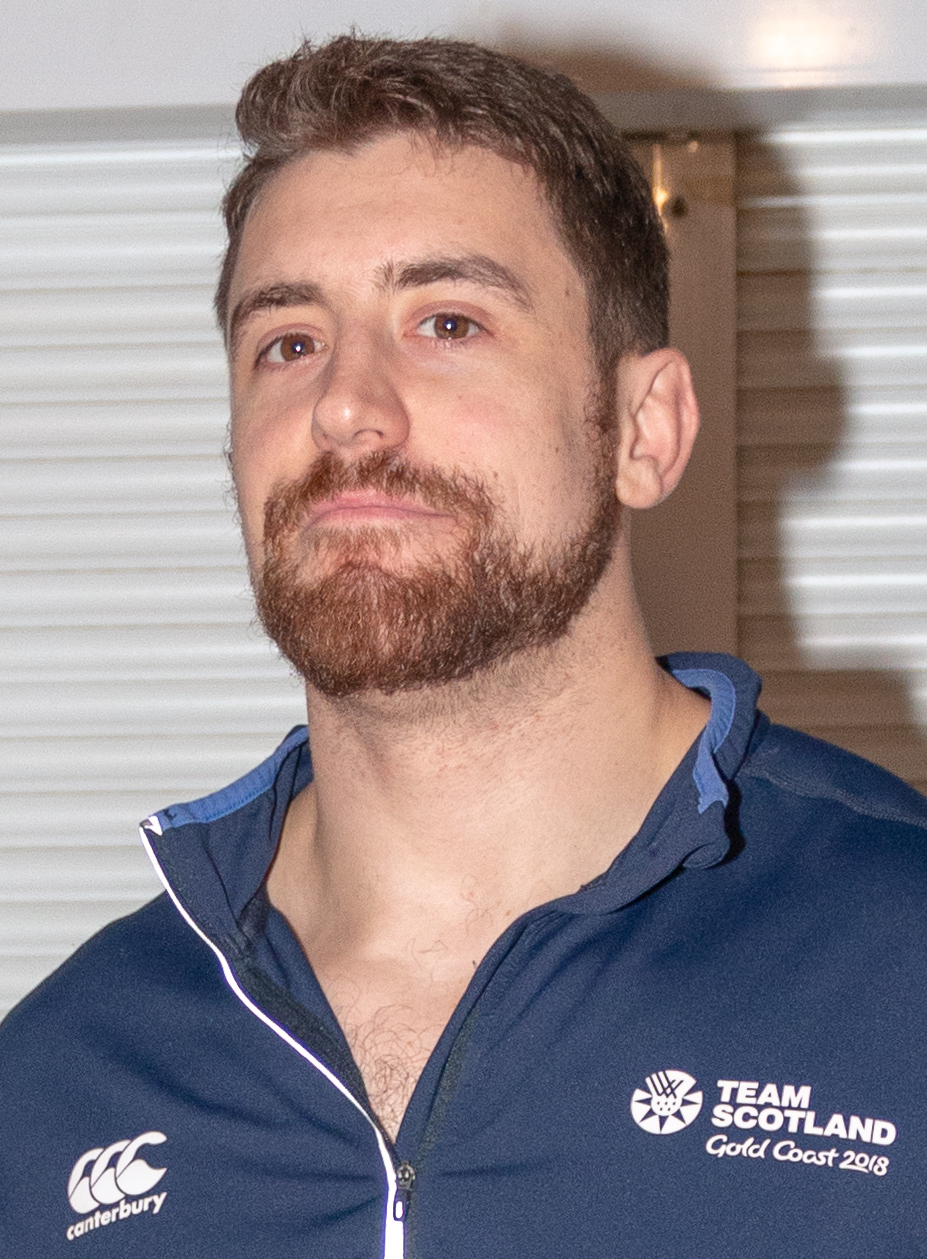
- Hendry in 2018

Personal information
- Full name: Joe Hendry
- Born: 1 May 1988 (age 38) Edinburgh, Scotland
- Height: 6 ft 2 in (188 cm)
- Weight: 230 lb (104 kg)
- Professional wrestling career
- Education: Heriot-Watt University (MA)
- Ring name: Joe Hendry
- Billed from: Edinburgh, Scotland
- Trained by: Ace Steel; Killian Dain; Mikey Whiplash; Robbie Brookside; Marty Jones; Terry Taylor
- Debut: 12 October 2013

Sport
- Country: Scotland
- Sport: Wrestling
- Events: Freestyle; Greco-Roman
- Club: Edinburgh Wrestling Club; Tryst Wrestling Club
Medal record
Representing Scotland
Men's Freestyle wrestling
British Senior Championships
Bronze medal – third place	2018 Manchester	97 kg
Gold medal – first place	2017 Nottingham	97 kg
English Senior Championships
Gold medal – first place	2018 Salford	97 kg
Men's Greco-Roman wrestling
British Senior Championships
Gold medal – first place	2018 Manchester	97 kg

Joe Hendry (born 1 May 1988) is a Scottish professional wrestler and former amateur wrestler. As of November 2026 he is signed to WWE, where he performs on the Raw brand.

Prior to his professional wrestling career, he worked as a musician and uses his past experience in his professional wrestling work. In addition to various other independent promotions, Hendry is known for his appearances in his native Scotland with Insane Championship Wrestling (ICW) from 2013 to 2019. He also performed in Ring of Honor. He first appeared in Impact Wrestling (renamed Total Nonstop Action Wrestling or TNA in 2024) in 2018 before returning to the company in September 2022. Hendry first made some brief non-wrestling appearances for WWE in 2014 before returning in 2024 on NXT through a working partnership between TNA and WWE. In 2025, Hendry became the first TNA World Champion to enter the Royal Rumble and have a match at WrestleMania. He signed with WWE that November and became a one-time NXT Champion.

A decorated amateur wrestler, Hendry has earned British Senior National Championships in freestyle and Greco-Roman wrestling. Hendry represented Great Britain internationally in freestyle wrestling at the Commonwealth Wrestling Championship in 2017, and subsequently earned a position on the freestyle wrestling team for Scotland at the 2018 Commonwealth Games.

== Professional wrestling career ==
=== Training and early career ===
Hendry initially trained to become a professional wrestler with Damian Mackle, Mikey Whiplash, Robbie Brookside, and Marty Jones at the Source Wrestling School. His first Canadian tour was with SMASH Wrestling. He has also worked for Pro Wrestling Ulster. In 2014, Hendry appeared as a Russian diplomat on the 10 November episode of Raw alongside Rusev and Lana. He also appeared multiple times as one of Adam Rose's Rosebuds.

=== Insane Championship Wrestling (2013–2019) ===
In 2013, Hendry began regularly appearing for Insane Championship Wrestling (ICW), and was first introduced as a member of James R. Kennedy's stable, the Kennedy Administration. He entered into a rivalry with Big Damo, before feuding with fellow Kennedy Administration member Kenny Williams. Williams won the ICW Zero-G Championship during this time, and Hendry faced him several times for the title but was unable to win it. On 6 April 2015, Hendry unsuccessfully challenged Drew Galloway for the ICW World Heavyweight Championship at Pro Wrestling Ulster event in which the EVOLVE and DGUSA Open the Freedom Gate titles were also on the line.

Hendry later formed tag team the Local Fire with Davey Boy. Together, they entered the ICW Tag Team Title Tournament (held to crown new champions once Polo Promotions left the company after winning the belts) and beat Mike Bird and Wild Boar in the finals at Shug's Hoose Party 3 on 31 July 2016 to win the vacant ICW Tag Team Championships. They lost the titles on 11 September 2016 to Polo Promotions in a ladder match.

On 16 June 2019, Hendry defeated Andy Wild at ICW I Ain't Yer Pal, Dickface!. On 27 July 2019, Hendry was forced to leave ICW after losing to Leyton Buzzard in a singles match at Night 1 of Shug's Hoose Party 6. This led to him signing with Ring of Honor just days later.

=== Romanian Wrestling Alliance (2014) ===
On 24 May 2014, Romanian Wrestling Alliance (RWA) held its inaugural "The Revolution" PLE. "Local Hero" Joe Hendry reached the final four of the "Revolution Rumble" main event, before being eliminated by "Beast of Belfast" Damian O'Connor, better known by the ring name Killian Dain or Damo.

=== Discovery Wrestling (2014–2025) ===
Hendry debuted for Discovery Wrestling in 2014, teaming with Marty Scurll to defeat Cryme Tyme (JTG & Shad Gaspard) Appearing sporadically he would face the likes of Grado, The Young Bucks, Damien O'Connor, Tommy Dreamer before earning a shot at Lewis Girvan's Y Division Championship, where he was unsuccessful.

Hendry earned his way back into title contention with victories over Dalton Castle, Kenny Williams, Timothy Thatcher and former champion Girvan.

On 6 October 2019, Hendry defeated Joe Coffey for the Y Division Championship. Holding the title for a record-setting 1,280 days, Hendry retained against Coffey, Theo Doros, Andy Wild, BT Gunn and Gene Munny before Munny defeated him in a rematch on 8 April 2023.

On 3 June 2023, Hendry returned to Discovery Wrestling to successfully defend his Impact Digital Media Championship against Jack Morris.

=== New Generation Wrestling (2015–2018) ===
Hendry made his debut for New Generation Wrestling (NGW) in 2015, losing a match to Nathan Cruz before forming Team Scotland with fellow ICW wrestlers Davey Blaze, Lionheart and Kid Fite. Team Scotland often antagonised NGW Champion Nathan Cruz and eventually challenged Cruz to face them in an eight-man tag team match with Cruz's title on the line with the stipulation that if Cruz or any of his teammates were pinned, he would lose the title. Cruz retained his title in the eight-man tag team match in November 2015. Hendry, Lionheart and Kid Fite next appeared for NGW in May 2016, all three answering the NGW Tag Team Championship Open Challenge set by The UK's Biggest Tag Team (Stixx and Colossus Kennedy). After Hendry used the belt as a weapon, the trio became the new tag team champions. The official name for the team was later confirmed to be Insane Fight Club.

=== WhatCulture Pro Wrestling / Defiant Wrestling (2016–2018) ===
Hendry then began working for WhatCulture Pro Wrestling (WCPW). The first few weeks Hendry started a feud with Joseph Conners when, on 3 September, at WCPW Stacked Hendry was involved in a fatal four way for the WCPW Championship, in which, he was betrayed by Conners, who won the title. He faced Conners two times for the WCPW Title, but was defeated twice. After two defeats by the then WCPW Champion Drew Galloway, Hendry turned heel. On 6 March, at Exit Wounds, Hendry, Joe Coffey, Travis Banks, and B. T. Gunn formed The Prestige, a stable claiming something was wrong with professional wrestling and they were going to fix it. At the Mexican qualifier for the WCPW Pro Wrestling World Cup, Hendry defeated Martin Kirby by referee stoppage, becoming the WCPW Champion. On 2 October 2017, at WCPW Refuse to Lose '17, Hendry defended his championship against Will Ospreay. During the match, Marty Scurll cashed in his 'Magnificent Seven' briefcase (which he won earlier in the night from Hendry's stablemate El Ligero) to make the match a triple threat. Scurll then won the championship by submitting Hendry with the crossface chickenwing. Hendry then started a feud with fellow stablemate Travis Banks, causing the exodus of Joe Coffey and BT Gunn from The Prestige.

=== Ring of Honor (2016) ===
In 2016, Hendry made a few appearances for the American promotion Ring of Honor during the promotion's tour of the United Kingdom titled Reach for the Sky. He competed on both nights of the tour, losing both of his matches against Donovan Dijak and Jay White on November 18 and November 19 respectively.

=== World of Sport Wrestling (2018–2019) ===
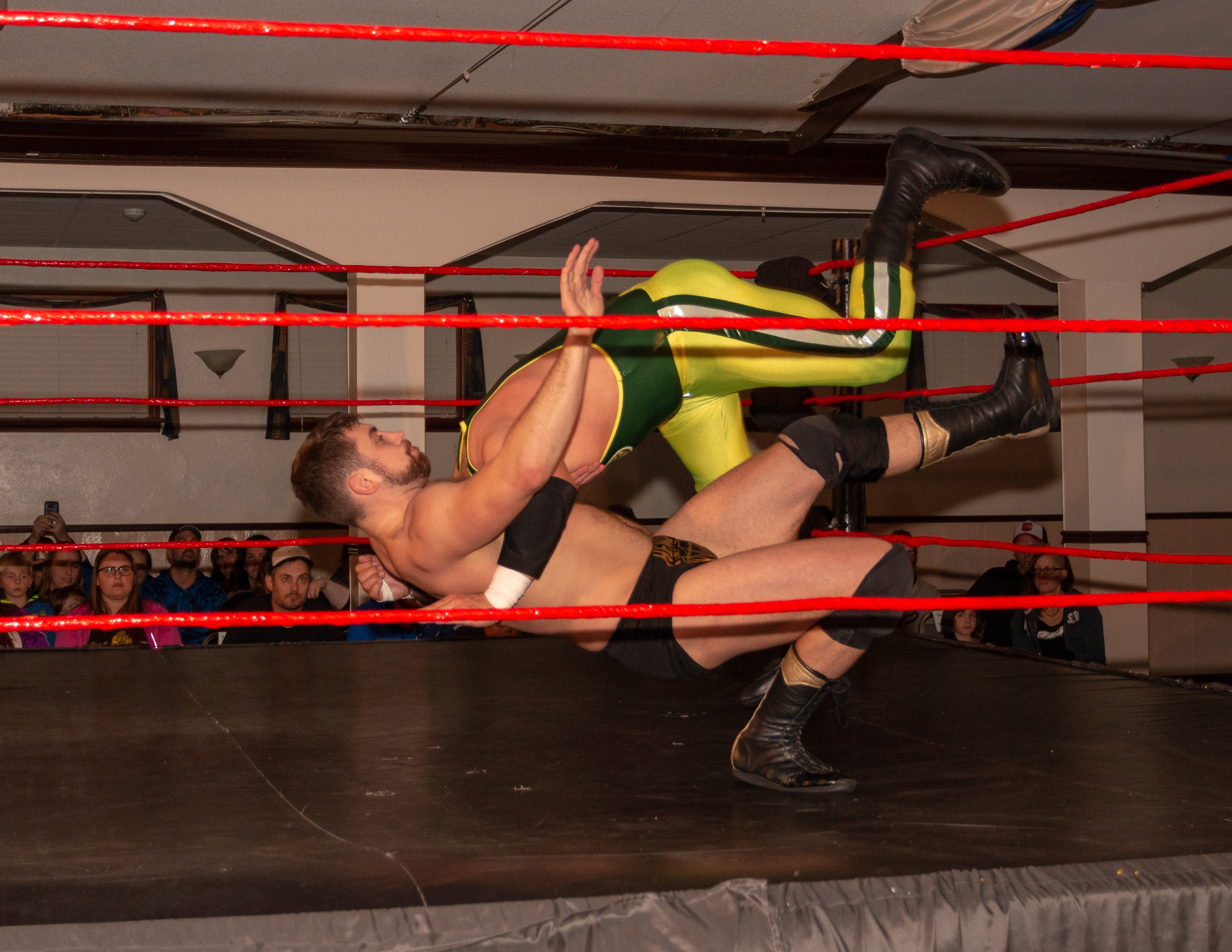
Hendry executing a DDT against Eric Cairnie at a PWA event in 2018

Between 10 and 12 May 2018, Hendry was part of the television tapings for the reboot of World of Sport Wrestling. On the 28 July episode of WOS Wrestling (taped 10 May), Hendry partnered Martin Kirby in the WOS Tag Team Championship first match against Iestyn Rees and Kip Sabian. However, Kirby walked away from Hendry during the match, allowing him to be beaten down by Rees and Sabian. The two men traded wins over each other; Kirby on the 11 August episode (taped 10 May) in a singles match, and Hendry on the 1 September episode (taped 11 May) in a submission match.

Hendry was also involved in title challenges for the WOS Championship. On the 4 August episode (taped 10 May), he interrupted a segment with the then-current champion, Rampage. Executive Stu Bennett gave him a title shot soon afterwards, but Hendry was defeated by Rampage. On the 18 August episode (taped 11 May), he wrestled in a number one contender three-way match, alongside Justin Sysum and Nathan Cruz, which Sysum won.

From January to February 2019, Hendry was part of the World of Sport Wrestling UK tour, where he was largely used in tag matches. He was successful in all of them, teaming with BT Gunn four times and Grado once.

=== Impact Wrestling (2018–2019) ===
On 25 May 2018, Impact Wrestling announced through Twitter that Hendry would be part of the 1 and 2 June television tapings for the promotion from Windsor, Ontario, Canada. Hendry made his debut for the company on the 5 July episode of Impact!, as a surprise to Grado by his girlfriend Katarina. On the 12 July episode, the trio got involved in a feud with Eli Drake, who insinuated to Grado that Hendry was trying to make Katarina his girlfriend. On the 17 July episode, Hendry defeated Drake in his first match for the company. On the 26 July episode, in a backstage segment, Drake gave the trio a gift which Grado unwrapped; it was a framed photograph of Hendry and Katarina together. Insulted by this action, Hendry and Katarina took the photograph away to dipose of it. On the 2 August episode, Hendry teamed with Grado in a tag team match with Drake, Trevor Lee and Caleb Konley. Lee and Konley took Hendry out of the match before the bell rung, which led to Grado being outnumbered and losing the match, and Hendry being tended to by Katarina on the outside, furthering the love triangle storyline. On the 9 August episode, in a backstage segment, the trio were arguing over the events of the previous week. Katarina questioned Grado over why he could not beat Drake on his own, because Hendry did, and Hendry told Grado that he would beat Drake again to end the feud. However, on the 16 August episode, Grado attempted to help Hendry as the referee was being distracted by Lee. Drake took control and pushed Hendry into Grado, knocking him off the apron and then winning the match with a roll up. On the 6 September episode, Hendry teamed with Grado in a tag team match against the Desi Hit Squad (Gursinder Singh and Rohit Raju), in a losing effort. Following the match, Katarina turned heel, berating Grado and splitting up with him, before proclaiming her love for Hendry. Katarina made out with Hendry, but Hendry rebuffed her, instead siding with Grado. Hendry then called her the embarrassment in the situation, not Grado, so Katarina slapped him and walked away. On the 27 September episode held in Mexico City, Mexico, Katarina approached Hendry and Grado in a backstage segment, and introduced Murder Clown to them, who would wrestle Hendry the following week. On the 4 October episode, Hendry was defeated by Murder Clown, which ended up being his final televised match for Impact Wrestling.

On 15 February 2019, Hendry thanked Impact Wrestling for giving him a platform to appear on their program, but announced that he was no longer signed to appear for the company.

=== Return to ROH (2018–2022) ===
In 2018, Hendry's return to ROH was announced as Silas Young's challenger for the ROH World Television Championship at the Honor United event on 24 May, which took place in Edinburgh. Hendry failed to win the title. Hendry would then compete for ROH during the Honor Re-United event, where he competed in a few matches, most notably participating in the International Cup on 16 August, where he lost to Hangman Page in the opening round. He competed in a four-way match on 18 August, that was won by Marty Scurll, and then lost to Jonathan Gresham in singles competition on 19 August.

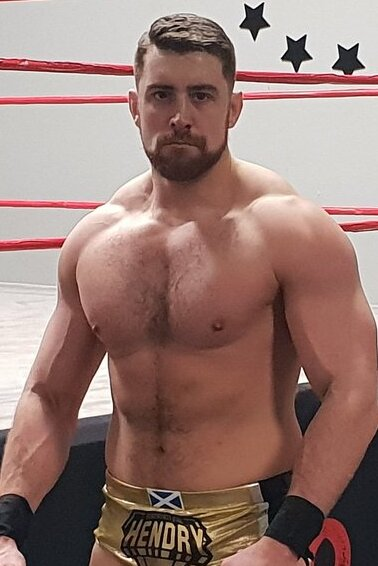
Joe Hendry at the Ring Of Honor dojo in 2020

On 8 August 2019, it was announced that Hendry was a free agent no longer, and had now signed a contract with ROH. Hendry made his first appearance as a full-time member of the ROH roster by interrupting Dalton Castle during a promo at Saturday Night at Center Stage on 24 August. Hendry would then show up as Castle's partner, the following night at Honor For All, where the two defeated Shinobi Shadow Squad (Cheeseburger and Eli Isom). Hendry subsequently formed a tag team with Castle while also competing in singles matches at the same time. At Glory By Honor XVII, Hendry participated in a battle royal to determine the #1 contender for the ROH World Championship, but was eliminated by the eventual winner Silas Young. Hendry unsuccessfully challenged Shane Taylor for the World Television Championship on the first night of Honor United on 25 October. The following night, on 26 October, Hendry rebounded from his loss by defeating former World Champion Matt Taven after Castle's entrance theme distracted Taven.

Hendry continued to team with Castle throughout the fall of 2019 and early 2020, competing in various matches, before ROH went on hiatus due to the outbreak of the COVID-19 pandemic in the United States. Hendry returned to ROH on 12 January 2021 by participating in an eight-man tag team match, which his team won.

Hendry would then challenge his former tag team partner Dalton Castle for the World Television Championship in a four corners survival match at Final Battle, also involving Rhett Titus and Silas Young. Titus won the title. Following Tony Khan's purchase of ROH, Hendry wrestled at Supercard of Honor XV, losing to Castle.

=== Return to Impact/Total Nonstop Action Wrestling (2022–2026) ===
==== Longest-reigning Digital Media Champion (2022–2023) ====
On 15 September 2022 episode of Impact!, a vignette aired that Hendry was coming to Impact Wrestling, with the company announcing on Twitter that he had signed with the promotion. On 7 October, at Bound for Glory, he made his in-ring return by participating in the Call Your Shot Gauntlet, being eliminated by Moose.

On 22 October 2022, Hendry won his first title in Impact Wrestling by defeating Brian Myers for the Impact Digital Media Championship, which aired on the November 10 episode of Impact!. He would soon begin feuding with Moose over the title after Moose mentioned Hendry's name on Impact!, leading to a match between the two for Digital Media Championship at Hard To Kill on 13 January 2023, which Hendry won to retain the title. After retaining the title against Matt Cardona on the 9 February episode of Impact!, Hendry continued his rivalry with Moose, leading to a Dot Combat match between the two for the Digital Media Championship at No Surrender, where Hendry retained again to end the feud. Hendry would then surpass Cardona to become the longest reigning Digital Media Champion and began feuding with former champion Brian Myers, defeating him to retain the title at Sacrifice.

At Rebellion, Hendry teamed with Dirty Dango and Santino Marella to defeat The Design (Deaner, Angels, Callihan, and Kon) in a handicap match, after Callihan turned on Design by attacking Deaner. Following the event, Marella was attacked, and Hendry and Dango decided to investigate who attacked Marella. On the May 18 episode of Impact!, Hendry revealed that Dango was Marella's assailant and Dango would soon lay out Hendry while proclaiming "case closed." This led to Hendry defending the Digital Media Championship against Dango at Under Siege. Hendry won by disqualification after Dango hit a low blow right in front of the referee. On 9 June at Against All Odds, Hendry successfully defended the title against Dango in a rematch to end the rivalry. On 15 July at Slammiversary, Hendry lost the title to Kenny King, ending his reign at 266 days.

On 9 September at Impact! 1000, Hendry and his tag team partner Yuya Uemura participated in the 20-man Feast or Fired match. Hendry told Uemura to grab briefcase number 4, which contained the pink slip, and Uemura was fired from Impact Wrestling. YouTuber Simon Miller reviewed Impact! 1000 on WhatCulture Wrestling's YouTube channel where he blamed Hendry for Uemura's firing. This led to Hendry and Miller attacking each other during the recording of Joe Hendry's Food Fight for Impact Wrestling's YouTube channel. On 20 October, Impact Wrestling confirmed that Hendry would face Miller at Turning Point, which Hendry won. On October 26, during the UK Invasion Tour, Hendry participated in the Glasgow Cup, defeating Rich Swann in the semifinal and Frankie Kazarian in the final to win the tournament.

==== Rise in popularity and TNA World Champion (2024–2025) ====
Hendry's Brand Logo (2023-present)

At Hard To Kill on 13 January 2024, Hendry interrupted the debut of A. J. Francis by playing a music video that mocked Francis and it culminated in Francis attacking Hendry with the assistance of DJ Whoo Kid. As a result, Hendry began feuding with Francis, who cost him a Digital Media Championship match against Crazzy Steve at Sacrifice. Hendry eventually faced Francis in a match on the 14 March episode of Impact!, which Hendry lost after Rich Swann betrayed him by hitting him with a steel chair and joined forces with Francis. It led to a match between Hendry and Swann at Rebellion, which Hendry lost due to interference by Francis and Shawne Merriman. Hendry went viral on social media with his theme tune, "I Believe In Joe Hendry", being released as a single. It peaked at number 4 on the UK Singles Downloads Chart and number 6 on the UK Singles Sales Charts on 3 May 2024. The song peaked at number 4 on the Official Big Top 40 Charts. On July 5 episode of iMPACT!, Hendry defeated Jake Something to earn the final spot in the six-way elimination match for the TNA World Championship at Slammiversary, which Hendry failed to win after Josh Alexander turned on him by hitting him with a low blow and eliminated Hendry. Nic Nemeth went on to win the match. As a result, Hendry began feuding with Alexander, defeating him via submission at Victory Road.

On the 26 September episode of Impact!, Hendry defeated Frankie Kazarian to become the #1 contender for the TNA World Championship at Bound for Glory. At the event on 26 October, Hendry failed to beat Nic Nemeth for the title after interference by John Layfield. Hendry protested over the loss and demanded a rematch but Director of Authority Santino Marella told him that he had to work his way up the card to earn another title shot. Hendry began his title pursuit by beating Nemeth's brother Ryan Nemeth on the November 14 episode of Impact!. At Turning Point, Hendry won a six-way Turkey Bowl match by pinning Brian Myers, forcing him to wear the turkey suit. At Final Resolution, Hendry defeated Josh Alexander, Mike Santana and Steve Maclin in a four-way match to become the #1 contender for the TNA World Championship, earning a title rematch against Nic Nemeth at Genesis.

At Genesis, Hendry defeated Nemeth to become the new TNA World Champion. Over the next two months, Hendry would successfully defend his title against the likes of Matt Cardona, Jake Something, Ryan Nemeth, and Hammerstone. At Sacrifice, Hendry along with Elijah, Matt Hardy, Leon Slater, and Nic Nemeth defeated The System (Eddie Edwards, Brian Myers, and JDC) and The Colons in a Steel Cage 10-man tag team match.

On the April 3 episode of TNA Impact!, Frankie Kazarian attacked Hendry and injured his arm, which would restart their feud. Hendry was subsequently taken to a nearby hospital. Later that night, Kazarian declared that he would be calling his shot for the TNA World Championship at Rebellion in his home state of California. However, NXT's Ethan Page made a surprise return to TNA and declared that after speaking with TNA Director of Authority Santino Marella, he would be challenging Hendry for the title at Rebellion (due to defeating Hendry in a match earlier in the year on NXT). Later that night, TNA announced that Hendry would defend the TNA World Championship against both Kazarian and Page in a three-way match at Rebellion. At the event, Hendry would retain his TNA World Title against Page and Kazarian. Following the match, Trick Williams would attack Hendry.

This would lead to a match at Under Siege, where Hendry would team with Elijah to defeat the team of Trick Williams and Frankie Kazarian. Two days later at NXT Battleground, Hendry lost the title to Trick Williams, ending his reign at 126 days. On July 20 at Slammiversary, Hendry failed to regain the title from Williams in a three-way match, also involving Mike Santana.

Hendry wrestled his final match as a TNA talent on the October 10 episode of Impact!, losing to Eric Young in a No Disqualification match.

==== One night return (2026) ====
While signed to WWE, Hendry made a one night return to TNA on January 17, 2026 at Genesis, defeating Cedric Alexander and Moose in a three-way match.

=== WWE (2024–present) ===
==== TNA crossover (2024–2025) ====
On 18 June 2024, Hendry made his WWE in-ring debut on NXT as one of TNA's representatives in a 25-man battle royal to determine the number one contender for the NXT Championship, where he was immediately eliminated by Frankie Kazarian. On the 9 July episode of NXT, Hendry appeared as Trick Williams' tag team partner after Williams' original tag team partner Je'Von Evans was taken out earlier that night to defeat NXT Champion Ethan Page and Shawn Spears. At Week 1 of The Great American Bash on 30 July, Hendry held his first live concert in WWE. Gallus (Joe Coffey, Mark Coffey and Wolfgang), who had taken issue with Hendry's NXT appearances, attacked Hendry halfway through his concert and a match between Hendry and Joe Coffey was made official for the following week where Hendry emerged victorious. On the 20 August episode of NXT, Hendry defeated Pete Dunne and Wes Lee in a triple threat match for an NXT Championship match against Page at NXT No Mercy. At the event on 1 September, Hendry failed to win the title from Page. On 1 February 2025, Hendry made his Royal Rumble debut, entering as the 15th entrant where he was eliminated by Roman Reigns.

Hendry made his surprise WrestleMania debut, answering Randy Orton's open challenge at Night 2 of WrestleMania 41 after his original opponent Kevin Owens was unable to compete due to a legitimate neck injury. He would ultimately go on to lose at the event.

On 22 April 2025, Hendry returned to NXT calling out Trick Williams before throwing him out the ring with the help of NXT Champion Oba Femi. On May 6, Hendry matched up with Tank Ledger and Hank Walker in a 6 man tag match against the Darkstate (Dion Lennox, Cutler James and Osiris Griffin along with Saquon Shugars). Due to Trick Williams running interference to attack Hendry, Dark State won by pinfall. Later that night, Hendry interfered in the battle royal, allowing Elijah to eliminate Williams. NXT General Manager Ava subsequently announced that after speaking with TNA Director of Authority Santino Marella, Hendry would defend his title against Williams at Battleground. At the event on May 25, Hendry lost the title to Williams. On June 25, Hendry made his return to NXT and attacked Trick Williams immediately after he defended his title against Josh Briggs, setting up the rematch at TNA Slammiversary, where Hendry lost.

==== NXT (2025–2026) ====
On November 13, it was reported that Hendry had officially signed with WWE. On the 26 December 2025 episode of SmackDown (taped a week prior), Hendry made his main roster debut on the SmackDown brand defeating The Miz in a Miracle on 34th Street Fight. On the 3 February 2026 episode of NXT, Hendry defeated Ricky Saints, Dion Lennox, Sean Legacy, Jackson Drake, Shiloh Hill, and Keanu Carver in a ladder match to win the vacant NXT Championship, earning his first title in WWE. At Stand & Deliver on April 4, Hendry lost the title to Tony D'Angelo in a fatal four-way match also involving Saints and Ethan Page, ending his reign at 60 days. Hendry competed in his final NXT match on "NXT: Revenge" Week Two on April 21 in a losing effort to Keanu Carver.

==== Raw (2026–present) ====
On the April 20 episode of Raw, Hendry was officially called up to the main roster as the newest member of the Raw brand with a concert scheduled for the following week's episode, in which he confirmed that he has officially signed with Raw, where he was interrupted by The Vision (Austin Theory and Logan Paul) who attempted to attack Hendry after he made fun of Logan Paul, before being aided by The Street Profits (Angelo Dawkins and Montez Ford). At Sunday Night's Main Event on September 6, Hendry lost to Dominik Mysterio after interference from The Judgment Day.

== Professional wrestling style and persona ==
Hendry has been a musician for 10 years, and was the lead singer for a band named Lost in Audio (they were close to signing a deal with Sony Music), and has incorporated his prior career into his professional wrestling work. Hendry writes and performs his own entrance music and videos. As a face, Hendry was known for flamboyant ring entrances, usually parodying a famous song to mock his opponent. Examples of this include: Phil Collins' "In the Air Tonight" used during his feud with former manager James R. Kennedy, the EastEnders theme tune to mock Sha Samuels, and Limp Bizkit's "Rollin' " to mock Wolfgang. In Insane Championship Wrestling, he was known as the "Local Hero", referring to a section of Kerrang! named "Local Heroes" that Hendry had appeared in, as to make fun of his "lack of musical success".

Following a heel turn in March 2017, where Hendry was the leader of WCPW stable The Prestige, he became known as "The Prestigious One". Although the stable disbanded in early 2018, Hendry has continued to refer to himself by the moniker, stating that "it's me with the volume turned up", and also in a BBC interview when training for the 2018 Commonwealth Games.

== Amateur wrestling career ==
A black belt in Judo, Hendry transitioned to amateur freestyle wrestling in 2014 at the relatively late age of 26. Hendry would capture the British Senior National Championship in freestyle wrestling in 2017, and was subsequently selected for membership on Team Scotland at the 2018 Commonwealth Games. Hendry went out of competition in the Round of 16, losing to Australia's Nicolaas Verreynne. Following the Commonwealth Games, Hendry would go on to win the British Senior National Championship in Greco-Roman wrestling in 2018.

== Other media ==
=== Music career ===
Hendry began making his own music at the age of fifteen using GarageBand and focused on making music for the next ten years before transitioning to professional wrestling. Hendry paroided many popular songs early in his wrestling career. While part of Insane Championship Wrestling, Hendry had the company publish video clips involving his music. While wrestling in Ring of Honor, Henry in 2019 created his entrance theme song I Believe in Joe Hendry which became a viral hit and continued to grow in popularity over the years. Hendry also began performing in-ring concerts during his time in Total Nonstop Action Wrestling.

Hendry released his debut studio album titled Beyond Belief on October 5, 2026, which was published by WWE Music.

=== Discography ===
Studio albums

- Beyond Belief (2026)

Singles:

- I C Double Me and You (2013)
- I Believe in Joe Hendry (2019)

=== Video games ===
Year	Title	Notes	Ref.
2026	WWE 2K26	Video game debut	

=== Filmography ===
Year	Title	Role	Notes
2023	I Believe in Joe Hendry	Self	Music video
2026	Can We Fire Logan Paul?	Self	Music video
2026	Give Joe Hendry Every Single Belt (Right Now)	Self	Music video
2026	Tables, Ladders and Chairs	Self	Music video
2026	If You Don't Love Joe Hendry	Self	Music video
2026	Agent of Shadows	Self	Microdrama series; acting debut

== Personal life ==
Hendry has a Master's degree in business and marketing from Heriot-Watt University. He is the nephew of politician Drew Hendry, the former SNP MP for Inverness, Nairn, Badenoch and Strathspey, and a former Highland Council leader.

== Championships and accomplishments ==
=== Amateur wrestling ===
- British Wrestling
  - 2018 British Senior Championship Freestyle Bronze Medal
  - 2018 British Senior Championship Greco-Roman Gold Medal
  - 2018 English Senior Championship Freestyle Gold Medal
  - 2017 British Senior Championship Freestyle Gold Medal
  - 2017 British Closed Senior Championship Freestyle Silver Medal
  - 2017 Tryst Open Senior Freestyle Gold Medal
  - 2015 Scottish Open Senior Freestyle Silver Medal
  - 2015 Tryst Open Senior Freestyle Bronze Medal

=== Professional wrestling ===
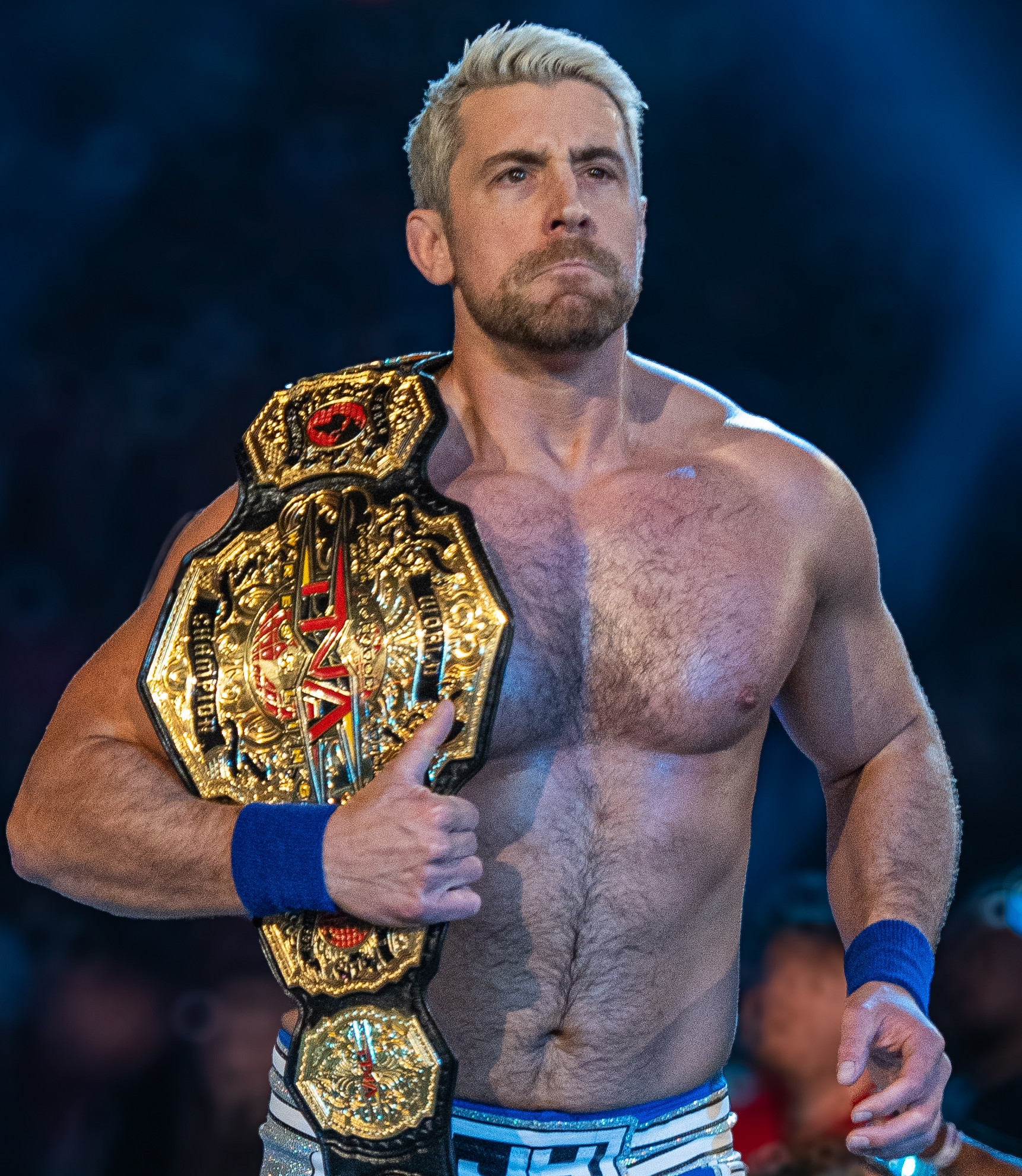
Joe Hendry is a one-time TNA World Champion

- British Wrestling Revolution
  - BWR Heavyweight Championship (1 time)
- Community Pro Wrestling
  - CPW Heavyweight Championship (1 time)
- DDT Pro-Wrestling
  - Ironman Heavymetalweight Championship (1 time)
- Discovery Wrestling
  - Y Division Championship (1 time)
  - DW Tag Team Championship (1 time) – with Dave Conrad
- Fight Forever Wrestling
  - Fight Forever Men's World Championship (1 time, final)
- Impact Wrestling/Total Nonstop Action Wrestling
  - TNA World Championship (1 time)
  - Impact Digital Media Championship (1 time)
  - TNA Turkey Bowl (2024)
  - Glasgow Cup (2023)
  - TNA Year End Awards (3 times)
    - Moment of the Year (2024) – for going viral with his parody songs about AJ Francis
    - Male Wrestler of the Year (2024)
    - Crossover Moment of the Year (2025) vs. Randy Orton at WrestleMania 41
- Insane Championship Wrestling
  - ICW Tag Team Championship (1 time) – with Davey Boy
  - ICW Tag Team Title Tournament (2016) – with Davey Boy
- New Generation Wrestling
  - NGW Tag Team Championship (1 time) – with Kid Fite and Lionheart
- Midwest All-Star Wrestling
  - MAW Tag Team Championship (1 time) – with Joey Avalon
- Pride Wrestling
  - N7 Championship (1 time)
- Pro Wrestling Elite
  - PWE Heavyweight Championship (1 time)
- Pro Wrestling Illustrated
  - Ranked No. 12 of the top 500 singles wrestlers in the PWI 500 in 2025
- Pro Wrestling Ulster
  - PWU All-Ulster Championship (2 times)
- Reckless Intent Wrestling
  - Reckless Intent World Championship (1 time)
  - Reckless Intent UK Championship (1 time)
- Respect Pro Wrestling
  - Respect Pro Wrestling Championship (1 time)
- Ring of Honor
  - ROH Year-End Award (1 time)
    - Best Entrance (2020)
- Scottish Wrestling Alliance
  - SWA Laird of the Ring Championship (1 time)
- Scottish Wrestling Entertainment
  - SWE Heavyweight Championship (1 time)
- Scottish Wrestling Network
  - SWN Award (2 times)
    - Outstanding Recognition Award for Versatility in Sport (2018)
    - Adam's Wrestler of the Year (2018)
- What Culture Pro Wrestling / Defiant Wrestling
  - WCPW World Championship (1 time)
  - Defiant Internet Championship (1 time, final)
  - Kurt Angle Invitational Rumble (2016)
- WWE
  - NXT Championship (1 time)
  - NXT Year-End Award (1 time)
    - Moment of the Year (2024) – Joe Hendry in NXT (June 18-September 1)
