= WhatCulture =

Entertainment news website

- Website type: Infotainment
- Available in: English
- Headquarters: WhatCulture; One Trinity Gardens; Newcastle-Upon-Tyne, United Kingdom
- Parent: Future Publishing Limited
- Website: whatculture.com
- Commercial: No
- Launched: 2006
- Current status: Active

WhatCulture is a British online entertainment news website and magazine which was launched in 2006. The site offers news in the field of professional wrestling, television, films, music, video games, and board games.

== History ==
Originally started by Peter Willis and Matt Holmes as ObsessedWithFilm in 2006, WhatCulture had its headquarters in Newcastle upon Tyne before moving to Baltic Place in 2015. As ObsessedWithFilm, the site was geared towards news and conversation about things going on in Hollywood. On August 17, 2011, WhatCulture's YouTube channel was created but the company did not upload its first video until October 14, 2014.

On December 11, 2014, WhatCulture opened a new channel originally named WhatCulture WWE, now known as WhatCulture Wrestling. On April 29, 2015, this channel introduced its first regular host, Adam Blampied. Content updates to the site became more frequent, other personalities including Adam Pacitti, Kenny McIntosh, Sam Driver, Jack "The Jobber" G. King, "King" Ross Tweddell, Simon Miller, and others were introduced, and their popularity rose. The hosts began to include an on-air kayfabe storyline feud between Blampied and his followers, collectively known as B-X, versus Pacitti and his followers, collectively known as Pacitti Club. WhatCulture expanded its coverage with red carpet events in Leicester Square, WWE Raw and San Diego Comic-Con panels, as well as starting its own wrestling promotion named WhatCulture Pro Wrestling (WCPW). In 2017, the WhatCulture brand was split and diversified, with the WCPW banner being rebranded as Defiant Wrestling, with the web series Loaded, featuring professional wrestlers Bea Priestley and Gabriel Kidd, returning to YouTube in late 2018. On September 19, 2017, WhatCulture announced on its Twitter page that Blampied, Pacitti, Tweddell, Driver and King were all leaving the company. The departed hosts would go on to create their own wrestling-dedicated site called Cultaholic, which originally included Blampied, but shortly after the channel announcement, Blampied backed out from the channel due to previous sexual misconduct incidents, which he admitted to and sought therapy for.

2017 also saw WCPW and later Defiant suffer financial issues due to YouTube advertisement policy and the promotion closed down in August 2019.

In March 2022, WhatCulture was acquired by Future Publishing.

== See also ==
- List of professional wrestling websites
