= Rampage Brown =

British professional wrestler (born 1983)

Personal information
- Born: Oliver Biney; 8 August 1983 (age 43) Leeds, England

Professional wrestling career
- Ring name(s): Bad News; Bad News Brown; Leroy Brown; Monty Lynch; Oliver Biney; Rampage Brown; Rampage; Steve Oliver
- Billed height: 6 ft 1 in (1.85 m)
- Billed weight: 233 lb (106 kg)
- Trained by: Drew McDonald
- Debut: 1998

Oliver Biney (born 8 August 1983) is an English professional wrestler who currently performs on the British independent circuit. He is also currently a trainer for New Generation Wrestling (NGW) in their North East School. He is best known for his time in WWE, performing under the ring name Rampage Brown. Biney also briefly worked for WWE's developmental territory Florida Championship Wrestling (FCW) in 2011. He also makes previous appearances Total Nonstop Action Wrestling (TNA) in September 2014.

== Professional wrestling career ==
=== WWE (2008, 2011) ===
Biney made his WWE debut on the 11 November 2008 episode of ECW, losing to Mark Henry.

In January 2011 Biney returned to WWE under Florida Championship Wrestling (FCW), which was WWE's developmental territory, this time working under the ring name of Monty Lynch. Biney made his FCW debut teaming with Kenneth Cameron in a losing effort against Damien Sandow and Titus O'Neil. Biney worked a few more matches with his last match ending in a loss to Husky Harris before being released in July 2011.

=== Progress Wrestling (2013–2019, 2023) ===
On 27 January 2013, Biney made his Progress Wrestling debut at Progress Chapter Five: For Those About To Fight, We Salute You losing to Nathan Cruz. On 28 July 2013, Biney defeated El Ligero for the Progress World Championship. Rampage successfully defended the championship against Doug Williams at Progress Chapter Nine: Hold me, Thrill me, Kick Me, Kill Me and at Progress Chapter Ten: Glory Follows Virtue As If It Were It’s Shadow against Stixx before losing it to Mark Andrews on the same night.

In 2014 Rampage competed in the Progress World Cup. Rampage defeated Paul Synnot in the quarter-finals. After this Rampage moved on to the semi-finals where he defeated Tommy End to advance to the finals where he was eliminated by Noam Dar.

In 2016, Rampage participated in the Strong Style 16 Tournament but would lose to Tommy End in the first round. Later that year, Rampage participated in a Round Robin Tournament to crown the first ever Progress Atlas Champion. On 25 September 2016 Rampage defeated Joe Coffey in the finals of the tournament to win the Progress Atlas Championship. Over the next few months, Rampage would successfully defend the title against Bad Bones and Dave Mastiff before losing the title on 15 January 2017 at Progress Chapter Forty—Two: Life, The Universe & Wrestling against Matt Riddle.

Rampage made his last pre-WWE appearance for the promotion on 30 December 2019 at Progress Chapter 100: Unboxing Live lV - A New Hope teaming with Dan Maloney in a losing effort against Moustache Mountain (Trent Seven and Tyler Bate).

=== RevPro (2013, 2019–2020, 2023–present) ===
Biney made his Revolution Pro Wrestling debut in 2013 at RevPro No Holds Barred losing to Colt Cabana in a RevPro British Heavyweight Title #1 Contendership Four Way Elimination Match being last eliminated by Cabana. This match also featured T-Bone and Dave Mastiff.

=== Insane Championship Wrestling (2014–2020) ===
Rampage made his Insane Championship Wrestling debut on 5 October 2014 at the O2 Academy Newcastle, in a losing effort to Kid Fite. Rampage would face Fite again almost a month later at the O2 Academy Leeds, picking up his first victory in the promotion. Almost a year to the day later, Rampage challenged Drew Galloway for the ICW World Heavyweight Championship in Newcastle, but was unsuccessful.

After appearing on two ICW events in 2016, Rampage returned in early 2017 alongside Ashton Smith, collectively known as The P.O.D (Personification Of Destruction). The P.O.D would defeat a number of teams in quick finish, losing only once in the year, challenging The Marauders for the ICW Tag Team Championship at Barramania 3. On 21 January 2018, The Wee Man unveiled The P.O.D as his new clients, with the team going on to capture the ICW Tag Team Championships from Polo Promotions in just over 1 minute. Rampage & Ashton would hold the titles until 15 April 2018, where they would lose the titles to The Kinky Party.

The P.O.D would not return to ICW together until Fear & Loathing XI, on 2 December at The SSE Hydro, where they defeated The Briscoe Brothers, The Kings Of Catch, The Purge, The Fite Network and Jimmy Havoc & Mark Haskins in a 6 team Tables, ladders, and chairs match, for a guaranteed shot at the ICW Tag Team Championships. Rampage & Ashton would cash-in their opportunity later that same night, defeating The Kinky Party in 1 minute & 30 seconds, to win the ICW Tag Team Championships for a second time.

=== Total Nonstop Action Wrestling (2014–2015) ===
In October 2014 Biney was a contestant on Season 2 of Total Nonstop Action Wrestling's British Boot Camp which was televised nationally in the UK on Challenge TV. He advanced to the final three but the competition was eventually won by Mark Andrews.

=== WCPW/Defiant Wrestling/New Generation Wrestling (2016–2019) ===
In 2016, Rampage made his debut with What Culture Pro Wrestling on the very first episode of WCPW Loaded following the main event between Big Damo and Joe Hendry accompanied by Adam Blampied attacking Adam Pacitti, establishing himself as a heel. The next week on Loaded, Rampage was chosen by Adam Blampied to compete against Big Damo for the WCPW Championship at WCPW’s first PPV Built To Destroy. Rampage would make his in-ring debut later that night in the main event defeating Noam Dar. At Built to Destroy, Rampage would come up short against Big Damo after Blampied turned on him, turning Rampage face in the process. Rampage once again challenged Big Damo for the WCPW World Championship at Stacked in a fatal-four way including Joe Hendry and Joseph Conners where the latter would win. On the next episode of Loaded, Rampage competed in the Kurt Angle Invitational Rumble but was eliminated by Big Damo. One week later, Rampage finally defeated Big Damo in a No Holds Barred match ending their rivalry. Rampage reignited his feud with Adam Blampied defeating him in a Street Fight at Refuse to Lose.

Rampage would enter a feud with Primate that would culminate in a Best of #7 Series. Primate would defeat Rampage in the first match at Delete WCPW which was a Lumberjack match, by referee’s decision. Rampage won the second match which was a No holds Barred match on an episode of Loaded. At WCPW Lights Out 2017, Primate defeated Rampage in a Boiler Room Brawl in their third match. Rampage won the fourth match in a Chairs match on Loaded. In their fifth match at WCPW True Destiny, Rampage defeated Primate once again. In their sixth and final match at WCPW Exit Wounds, Rampage defeated Primate in a Chain match winning the series at 4-2 and ending the feud.

He would later occasionally pop up for matches, defeating Bad Bones WCPW Chain Reaction and Drake at WCPW Bulletproof: Championship Showdown. Rampage entered the Pro Wrestling World Cup '17 defeating Nick Aldis in the first round of the English Qualifying round but losing to Will Ospreay in the finals. At WCPW State of Emergency, Rampage challenged Drew Galloway for the WCPW World Championship but lost. Over the next few months, Rampage would pursue the WCPW World Championship challenging for it in a 30 man Royal Rumble match at WCPW No Regrets that was won by Joe Hendry and against Hendry in a singles match at WCPW Built to Destroy 2017 but was unsuccessful.

Rampage participated in WCPW’s first ever Magnificent 7 Ladder match on the 22 July 2017 episode of Loaded against El Ligero, Jay Lethal, Gabriel Kidd, Drake, Alex Gracie and Primate. This match was similar to WWE’s Money in the Bank concept where the winner would win a briefcase that would allow them to cash it in and challenge for the WCPW World Championship anytime in the next year. The match was won by El Ligero.

On 19 March 2018 at the newly renamed, Defiant Wrestling's event Lights Out 2018, Rampage defeated Christopher Daniels, El Ligero, Gabriel Kidd, Joe Hendry, No Fun Dunne and Prince Ameen in the second Magnificent 7 Ladder Match to win the Magnificent 7 Briefcase. On 7 April 2018 Rampage defeated Robbie X at NGW homecoming "10 years later" at the Hull Eastmount. On 28 April 2018 at No Regrets, Rampage defeated Austin Aries to become the new Defiant Champion. He would go on to hold the championship for 322 days the longest in the title’s history. Rampage defeated Martin Kirby at Built To Destroy '18 to retain the title. He then had successful defences against Gabriel Kidd and David Starr, among others. On 16 March 2019 at Magnificent Seven, Rampage lost the Defiant title to Rory Coyle, but on 17 April 2019 at Lights Out he defeated Coyle to regain the title and become the first and only two-time Defiant World Champion. He then successfully defended the title against Kyle Fletcher at Defiant Loaded #23. At Built to Destroy 2019, Rampage lost the Defiant World Championship to David Starr in what would be his final match for the promotion before it closed later that year.

=== World of Sport Wrestling (2016–2019) ===
Rampage was one of the roster members for the newly revived World of Sport Wrestling in 2016. On 31 December 2016, Rampage made his debut teaming with Ashton Smith to face The Coffey Brothers (Joe Coffey and Mark Coffey) in a losing effort.

On the first episode of WOS Wrestling 28 July 2018, Rampage defeated Grado and Justin Sysum to become the new WOS Champion. Rampage would make successful title defenses against the likes of Justin Sysum and Davey Boy Smith Jr. before losing the title to Sysum on the 28 September 2018 episode of WOS Wrestling.

On 18 January 2019, Rampage returned to the promotion defeating Will Ospreay. Rampage would unsuccessfully challenge Justin Sysum for the WOS Championship on multiple occasions. Rampage’s last appeared of the promotion on 3 February 2019 once again losing to Justin Sysum for the WOS Championship.

=== Return to WWE (2020–2022) ===
In October 2020, it was reported that Biney had re-signed with WWE and he reported to the WWE UK Performance Center on 28 October.

Biney made his debut under the ring name Rampage Brown on the 12 November 2020 episode of NXT UK defeating Jack Starz. Over the next few months, Rampage would rack up wins over the likes of Saxon Huxley, Josh Morrell, Dave Mastiff and Joe Coffey. After his win over Coffey, he accepted his handshake, establishing him as a face in the process. On the 21 March 2021, episode of NXT UK, Rampage interrupted NXT UK Champion Walter and declared himself the next challenger for the championship. At NXT UK Prelude, Walter defeated Brown to retain his championship. Rampage later challenged Ilja Dragunov for the NXT UK Championship but was defeated due to referee stoppage.

Sometime in 2022, Brown was released from his contract. This was confirmed by WWE with his profile being moved to the alumni section of their own roster page.

=== Return to Independent scene (2022–present) ===
Biney returned to the UK independents in December 2022, challenging Dan Moloney for the TNT World Championship and BT Gunn for the BCW Heavyweight Championship. In June 2023, he faced Robbie X for the 1PW Openweight Championship in a losing effort. He was announced for Fife Pro Wrestling Asylum's 7 September 2023 Truth or Dare event and attempted to regain the UEWA European Heavyweight Championship in the main event, losing to champion Andy Roberts.

== Championships and accomplishments ==
- 3 Count Wrestling
  - 3CW Championship (2 times)
- All Star Wrestling
  - ASW British Heavyweight Championship (2 times)
  - ASW One Night Tournament (2012)
  - ASW British Heavyweight Title Tournament (2009)
- British Wrestling Revolution
  - BWR Heavyweight Championship (1 time)
- Defiant Wrestling
  - Defiant World Championship (2 times)
  - Magnificent 7 (2018)
- Insane Championship Wrestling
  - ICW Tag Team Championship (2 times) – with Ashton Smith
- International Pro Wrestling: United Kingdom
  - UK Super 8 Tournament (2015)
- New Generation Wrestling
  - NGW Undisputed Championship (3 times)
- NORTH Wrestling
  - NORTH Tag Team Championship (1 time) – with Will Kroos
- Preston City Wrestling
  - PCW Tag Team Championship (2 times) – with Tyson T-Bone
  - Road To Glory Tournament (2016)
  - Tag Team Road To Glory Tournament (2018)
- Pro Wrestling Illustrated
  - Ranked No. 417 of the top 500 singles wrestlers in the PWI 500 in 2021
- Progress Wrestling
  - Progress Championship (1 time)
  - Progress Atlas Championship (1 time)
  - Progress Atlas Championship Round Robin Tournament (2016)
  - Simon Miller's Ups And Downs Battle Royal (2023)
- Revolution Pro Wrestling
  - RPW Undisputed British Tag Team Championship (1 time) – with The Great O-Kharn
- Southside Wrestling Entertainment
  - SWE Tag Team Championship (1 time) – with The Great O-Kharn
- Tidal Championship Wrestling
  - TCW Championship (2 times)
- TNT Extreme Wrestling
  - Battle Royal (2022)
- True Grit Wrestling
  - True Grit Cup (2014)
- Union of European Wrestling Alliances
  - European Heavyweight Championship (1 time, inaugural)
  - European Heavyweight Championship Tournament (2009)
- World of Sport Wrestling
  - WOS Championship (1 time)
- Wrestle Gate Pro
  - Wrestle Gate Heavyweight Championship (1 time, inaugural, final)
  - Emerald Grand Prix (2019)
