= Travis Banks =

New Zealand professional wrestler (born 1987)

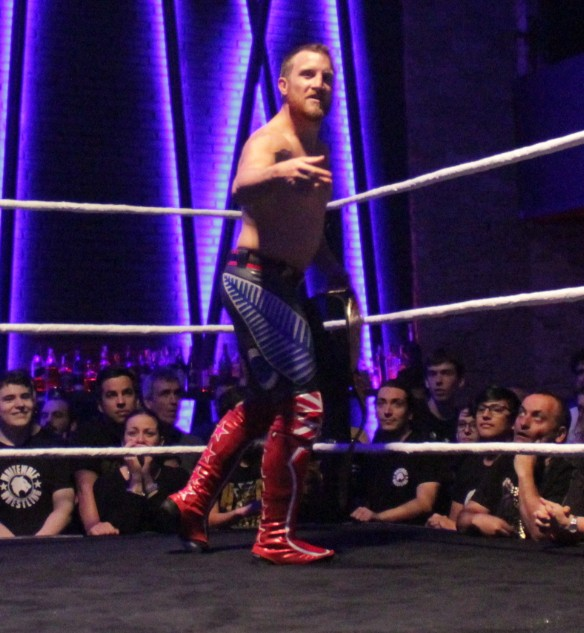

Personal information
- Born: Travis Bligh; 15 February 1987 (age 39) Bulls, New Zealand

Professional wrestling career
- Ring name: Travis Banks
- Billed height: 1.75 m (5 ft 9 in)
- Billed weight: 90 kg (198 lb)
- Billed from: Auckland, New Zealand
- Trained by: Kayden Cross; Martin Stirling; Kingi
- Debut: 6 March 2009

Travis Bligh (born 15 February 1987), better known by his ring name Travis Banks, is a New Zealand professional wrestler. He currently works on the Mexican independent circuit, predominantly for International Wrestling Revolution Group (IWRG), where he was former one-time IWRG Intercontinental Middleweight Championship, Kaoz Lucha Libre and The Crash Lucha Libre. He is best known for his time in WWE on their NXT UK brand. He is also known for competing in promotions such as Fight Club Pro (FCP), What Culture Pro Wrestling (WCPW), Attack! Pro Wrestling, Revolution Pro Wrestling (RevPro), and Progress Wrestling, where he is a former one-time Progress World Champion.

== Professional wrestling career ==
=== Independent circuit (2009–2018) ===
On 30 March 2013, at IPW Genesis, Banks was involved in a #1 Contendership Battle Royal for the IPW New Zealand Heavyweight Championship, Banks and Liam Fury both eliminated each other making the match a draw. On 27 April 2013, at IPW Decade Of Impact, Banks would win the IPW New Zealand Heavyweight Championship in a Triple Threat Match against Kingi and Liam Fury. On 6 September 2013, on ROH Road To Greatness Night 1, Banks would debut in Ring of Honor as he teamed with Aaron Solo and Mike Dean in a losing effort to Cheeseburger, Nick Merriman and Will Ferrara. He returned to ROH on 20 November 2016, at ROH Reach For The Sky Night 3, where he was defeated by Kyle O'Reilly at York Hall during one of the company's UK shows. He would appear again for the promotion at a UK show when he and Chris Brookes, as CCK, defeated The Boys at War of the Worlds Night 2 on 18 August 2017.

On 28 June 2017 it was announced that Banks would debut for Pro Wrestling Guerrilla (PWG) by entering the 2017 Battle of Los Angeles. He defeated Mark Haskins in the first round and Marty Scurll in the quarter finals before being eliminated from the tournament in the semifinals by Ricochet. On 16 February 2018 at Neon Knights, Banks beat David Starr.

On 26 June 2018, it was announced that Banks would be taking part in the 2018 Battle of Los Angeles.

In June 2019, Banks wrestled for White Wolf Wrestling in Spain and won the Absolute Championship, a title he held until December.

=== Progress Wrestling (2016–2020) ===
Banks debuted for Progress Wrestling in June 2016 by assisting TK Cooper in defeating Jack Sexsmith at Chapter 32. His debut match for Progress took place a month later at Chapter 33 where he and Cooper defeated Sexsmith and Roy Johnson. Banks and Cooper would collectively be known as the South Pacific Power Trip and began a winning streak as a team that lasted until Chapter 45 where they were unsuccessful in challenging British Strong Style (Trent Seven and Tyler Bate) for the Progress Tag Team Championship.

Banks entered the Super Strong Style 16 Tournament in 2017 where he defeated Jimmy Havoc in the first round, Flamita in the quarter finals and Zack Sabre Jr. in the semi-finals. Banks would defeat Tyler Bate in the tournament finals, after which he asked to face the Progress World Champion at Chapter 55 at Alexandra Palace in September 2017.

On 10 September Banks defeated Pete Dunne to become the new Progress World Champion. He successfully defended the title against a diverse range of opponents such as Matt Riddle, Keith Lee, Will Ospreay, and Mark Andrews. Over WrestleMania 34 weekend in April 2018, PROGRESS Wrestling held two shows in Louisiana during which Banks successfully defended his title in matches against Jeff Cobb and Shane Strickland. Also in April 2018, PROGRESS embarked on a mini tour of Australia, culminating in Banks retaining his title against Robbie Eagles.

After a feud that saw Banks previously retain the title by count-out, he eventually lost the PROGRESS World Championship to Walter at Chapter 74. Due to a dislocated shoulder, Banks was unable to take part in PROGRESS’ Coast to Coast tour of America in August 2018. He returned from injury at Chapter 79, defeating David Starr.

Progress cut all ties with Banks after the Speaking Out movement in June 2020.

=== Revolution Pro Wrestling (2017–2018) ===
Alongside Chris Brookes as CCK (Commonwealth Catch Kings), Banks won the Revolution Pro Wrestling tag team titles from Charlie Sterling and Joel Redman in his first match for the company. CCK successfully defended those titles against a number of teams including Ryan Smile and Shane Strickland, Sami Callihan and Martin Stone, and Los Ingobernables de Japón (Bushi and Hiromu Takahashi) before losing the belts to Moustache Mountain (Trent Seven and Tyler Bate).

CCK had a successful Global Wars 2017, winning against CHAOS (Rocky Romero and Yoshi-Hashi) on Night One and successfully teaming with Kid Lykos on Night Two against the CHAOS team of Gedo, Hirooki Goto and Yoshi-Hashi. CCK then attempted to regain the tag team titles from new champions Suzuki-gun (Minoru Suzuki & Zack Sabre Jr.) but lost to the champions at Epic Encounter 2018.

=== WWE (2017–2020) ===
Banks first worked for the WWE on 1 April 2017, participating in a match at WWE Wrestlemania Axxess where he teamed with TK Cooper in a losing effort to Mustafa Ali and Rich Swann. He was offered a contract the next year and, on 18 May 2018, it was announced that Banks would be taking part in the second ever WWE United Kingdom Championship Tournament. He get to the finals, where he was defeated by Zack Gibson. Banks worked for WWE in the NXT UK brand until 2020. During that time, was defeated by Noam Dar at NXT UK TakeOver:Cardiff, the second Takeover event hosted by the NXT UK Brand. He also faced Walter for the NXT UK Championship (NXT UK's main championship) in June 2019, but he was defeated too. He participated at Worlds Collide (an event with the participation of the NXT and NXT UK brands) in a fatal four-way match for the NXT Cruiserweight Championship, but Jordan Devlin won the title. His stint in WWE ended in June 2020, when he was released by the promotion after he was accused of emotional abuse during a relationship with a 17-year-old trainee.

=== Return to wrestling (2021–present) ===
On 10 November 2021, Banks would make his first statement, stating that due to the allegations, his UK work visa was revoked and he had to leave the country. He announced his return to professional wrestling in early 2022. He announced that he would only wrestle in the Mexican independent scene. He was booked to appear in September 2021 at Mexicanos Al Grito de Guerra, an event promoted by Big Lucha, Mexican promotion created by Bandido, but he was removed from the card after several fans complained about him being at the event. He was also booked by The Crash in a tag team match with Marty Scurll. However, one of his rivals, Lince Dorado, asked to be removed from the match, since Banks and Scurll were accused during the Speaking Out Movement.

Recently on 18 July, in an event held by the independent promotion Wrestling League Society, Travis defeated Iron Kid for the promotion's top championship, capturing his second championship in his career in Mexico since his return.

Beginning in 2022 he started a collaboration with Morelia Michoacan wrestling company SCW where he defeated Rene Rocks for the company's top title which he has successfully defended multiple times until April 2023.

== Speaking Out incident ==
As part of the Speaking Out movement wrestler Millie McKenzie accused Banks of emotional abuse and of abusing his position of trust over her by having a relationship with her when she was seventeen years old (Note: The age of consent in the UK is sixteen) and his trainee at Fight Club Pro. Banks had been thirty years old at the time of the relationship. Banks released a statement admitting to the relationship. McKenzie released screenshots of abusive messages allegedly from Banks and claimed he had abused his position of trust over other trainees. Progress cut ties with Banks on 20 June 2020. On 26 June, Banks was released (without formal confirmation) from WWE.

== Championships and accomplishments ==
=== Sumo ===
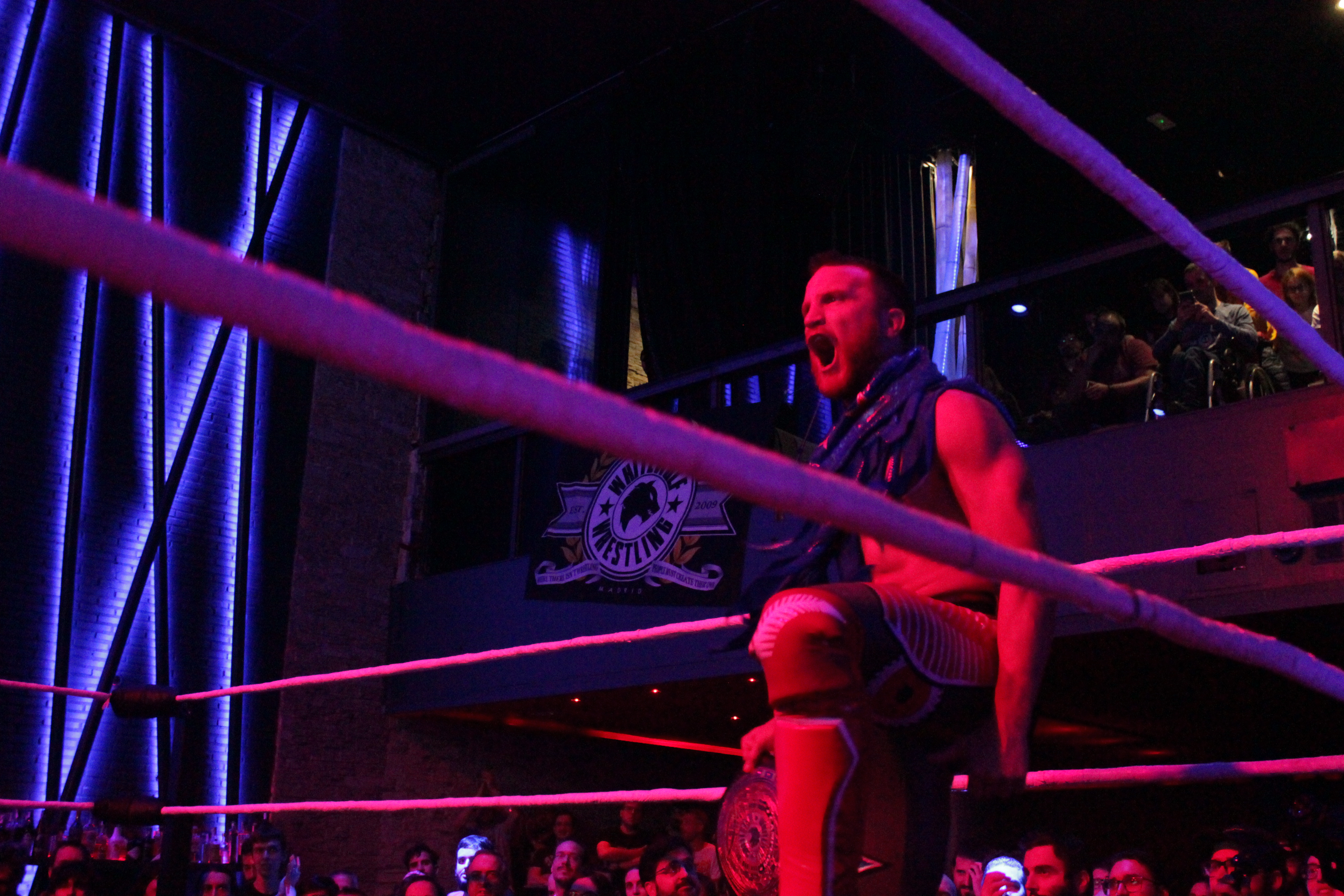
- Banks as Triple W Champion
  Oceania sumo wrestling championships
  - Silver medal in the lightweight

=== Professional wrestling ===
- Attack! Pro Wrestling
  - Attack! 24:7 Championship (1 time)
- Defiant Wrestling
  - Defiant Internet Championship (1 time)
- Fight Club: Pro
  - Infinity Tournament (2016)
  - FCP World Championship (1 time)
- International Wrestling Revolution Group
  - IWRG Intercontinental Middleweight Championship (1 time)
- Impact Pro Wrestling
  - IPW New Zealand Heavyweight Championship (2 times)
  - Armageddon Cup Championship (1 time)
- Lucha Forever
  - Lucha Forever Championship (1 time)
- New Zealand Wide Pro Wrestling
  - NZWPW Tag Team Championship (1 time) – with J.C. Star
- Progress Wrestling
  - Progress World Championship (1 time)
  - Super Strong Style 16 (2017)
- Pro Wrestling Illustrated
  - Ranked No. 67 of the top 500 singles wrestlers in the PWI 500 in 2018
- Revolution Pro Wrestling
  - Undisputed British Tag Team Championship (1 time) – with Chris Brookes
- Millennial Wrestling Factory
  - MWF Millennial Championship (1 time)
- Strong Classic Wrestling
  - Strong Classic Wrestling Championship (1 time)
- Wrestling League Society
  - Wrestling League Society World Championship (1 time)
- White Wolf Wrestling
  - Triple W Undisputed Championship (1 time)
- Revolution Indy Wrestling
  - RIW Junior Heavyweight Championship (1 time)
