= Joseph Conners =

English professional wrestler (born 1987)

Personal information
- Born: Josep Conner Buckton; 28 May 1987 (age 39) Nottingham, Nottinghamshire, England, United Kingdom

Professional wrestling career
- Ring name: Joseph Conners
- Billed height: 6 ft 1 in (1.85 m)
- Billed weight: 190 lb (86 kg)
- Trained by: Stixx
- Debut: 2006

Joseph Conner Buckton (born 28 May 1987) is an English professional wrestler. Conners competed in many British wrestling promotions, most notably New Generation Wrestling (NGW) and What Culture Pro Wrestling (WCPW), where he was a one-time WCPW Champion. In 2017 and 2018 he took part in WWE's UK Championship Tournament, and until 2021 competed on WWE's NXT UK brand.

== Training ==
Joseph Conners trained at the House Of Pain Wrestling Academy under veteran UK wrestler Stixx.

== Professional wrestling career ==
=== What Culture Pro Wrestling (2016–2017) ===
On 24 August 2016, at What Culture Pro Wrestling's Stacked event, Conners defeated Big Damo, Joe Hendry (whom he had betrayed) and Rampage in a Fatal four-way match to become WCPW Champion. Conners would successfully defend the championship against El Ligero, Drew Galloway, Martin Kirby, Cody Rhodes and Joe Hendry, at various WCPW events, as well as against "Darkside" James Scott outside of WCPW territory. At Delete: WCPW on 30 November 2016, Conners lost the championship to Drew Galloway in a triple threat match, also featuring Joe Hendry.

At WCPW KirbyMania, Conners returned for the first time since signing his WWE United Kingdom Championship Tournament contract, attacking Joe Hendry during his match with Drake, setting up a no holds barred match between the two, ultimately losing via submission After an almost 9-month absence Conners returned to WCPW as a surprise entrant into the Pro Wrestling World Cup round of 16 replacing Michael Elgin who had to drop out due to a scheduling conflict. Conners defeated Joe Coffey in Elgin's stead to advance to the quarterfinals the next night where once again he was successful in defeating his opponent, Hiromu Takahashi, and advancing to the semifinals. However, two nights later, he would lose his semifinal match against Kushida after passing out to Kushida's Hoverboard Lock.

=== WWE (2016–2021) ===
On 15 December 2016, it was revealed that Conners would be one of 16 men competing in a two-night tournament to crown the first ever WWE United Kingdom Champion on 14 and 15 January 2017. Conners defeated James Drake in the first round, advancing to the quarter-finals, where he was defeated by Mark Andrews. In November 2017, Conners returned to WWE and competed in several dark matches and on several house shows. On the November 7 episode of 205 Live, Conners returned to WWE programming for one night in Manchester, England to participate in an in-ring segment with Enzo Amore and other wrestlers from the WWE UK tournament. Later in the episode he would team with James Drake in a tag team match against Cedric Alexander and Mark Andrews in a losing effort. He returned to 205 Live in 2018, teaming with Drew Gulak and James Drake in a losing effort to Cedric Alexander, Flash Morgan Webster, and Mustafa Ali. He would then go on to compete in the 2018 WWE United Kingdom Championship Tournament, losing to Ashton Smith in the first round. In late 2021, Conners left NXT UK.

=== Independent circuit (2022–present) ===
In January 2022, Conners made his Italian return at SIW mothership show "Giorno del Giudizio". After taking part to a No.1 contendership battle royal, he was a fixture to SIW's Twitch weekly telecast, "SIW System", finally forcing his way to an Italian Title match against champion Tempesta at their February "Back to War" System TV special, which he lost via roll-up.

On 5 February 2022, it was announced that Conners was to make his return to the ring North Wrestling Triple Threat Match for the NW Championship Rory Coyle vs Liam Slater.

He then returned to SIW, defeating the No.1 contender Darko, making the match for the Italian championship at "TuttoxTutto" a triple threat. At "TuttoxTutto" he lost the match when he tapped out to Tempesta's Sharpshooter.

== Championships and accomplishments ==
- APEX Wrestling
  - APEX Heavyweight Championship (1 time)
- British Wrestling Revolution
  - BWR Heavyweight Championship (2 time, inaugural)
  - BWR Heavyweight Championship Tournament (2017)
  - Riot Rumble (2019)
  - DPW Tag Team Championship (1 time) - with Dan Evans
- Hungarian Championship Wrestling
  - HCW Revolution Championship (1 time)
- Leicester Championship Wrestling
  - LCW Championship (1 time)
  - LCW Tag Team Champion (2 times) – with Paul Malen (1) and Stixx (1)
- No Mercy Wrestling
  - No Mercy Wrestling Championship (1 time)
- Norton British Wrestling
  - Shining Star Tournament (2008)
- Pro Wrestling Chaos
  - King Of Chaos Championship (1 time)
- Pro Wrestling Illustrated
  - Ranked No. 235 of the top 500 singles wrestlers in the PWI 500 in 2019
- Scoula Italiana Wrestling
  - SIW Wild Championship (1 time)
- Southside Wrestling Entertainment
  - SWE (World) Heavyweight Championship (3 times)
  - SWE Tag Team Championship (3 times) – with Paul Malen (1), Jimmy Havoc (1), and El Ligero (1)
- Sovereign Pro Wrestling
  - Sov Pro Wrestling World Heavyweight Championship (1 time, inaugural)
  - Sov Pro Wrestling World Heavyweight Championship Tournament (2022)
- Tidal Championship Wrestling
  - TCW Championship (1 time)
- TNT Extreme Wrestling
  - TNT World Championship (1 time)
  - TNT IGnition Rumble (2025)
- Royal Imperial Wrestling
  - RIW Full Impact Championship (1 time)
- What Culture Pro Wrestling
  - WCPW Championship (1 time)
