= DEFY x Progress Toronto =

2023 Progress Wrestling and DEFY Wrestling co-promoted event

- Promotional poster of the event
- Promotion(s): Progress Wrestling; DEFY Wrestling
- Date: June 25 (Aired July 13, 2023)
- City: Toronto, ON
- Venue: Toronto Rec Room

Event chronology
← Previous; Progress; Chapter 153: Super Strong Style 16; DEFY; DEFY Heathens	Next → Progress; Chapter 154: It's Clobberin' Time; DEFY; DEFY Showdown At The Mountain

DEFY x Progress chronology
← Previous —	Next → Progress x Noah x DEFY

DEFY x Progress Toronto was a professional wrestling event co-promoted by Progress Wrestling and DEFY Wrestling. It took place on June 25, 2023, at the Toronto Rec Room in Toronto, Canada.

Six matches were contested at the event. In the main event, Gurv Sihra and Harv Sihra defeated Matt Cross and Psycho Mike to retain the DEFY Tag Team Championship.

== Production ==
=== Storylines ===
The event included matches that each resulted from scripted storylines, where wrestlers portrayed heroes, villains, or less distinguishable characters in scripted events that built tension and culminated in a wrestling match or series of matches. Results were predetermined by Progress' creative writers, while storylines were produced on Progress' events airing on the Demand PROGRESS streaming service.

=== Event ===
The event started with the six-man tag team confrontation between the team of Evan Rivers, Judas Icarus and Travis Williams, and the team of Brent Banks, Psycho Mike and Vaughn Vertigo, solded with the victory of the latters. Next up, Schaff defeated Bryan Keith to retain the Pacific Northwest Heavyweight Championship. The third bout saw Spike Trivet defeating Artemis Spencer to secure the thirteenth consecutive defense of the PROGRESS World Championship in that respective reign. Next up, Vert Vixen defeated Allie Katch, Nicole Matthews and Session Moth Martina to retain the DEFY Women's Championship. In the semi main event, Charles Crowley picked up a victory over Gringo Loco in singles competition.

In the main event, Gurv Sihra and Harv Sihra defeated Matt Cross and Psycho Mike to retain the DEFY Tag Team Championship.

== Results ==
No.	Results	Stipulations	Times
1	Brent Banks, Psycho Mike and Vaughn Vertigo defeated Sovereign (Evan Rivers, Judas Icarus and Travis Williams) by pinfall	Six-man tag team match	17:31
2	Schaff (c) defeated Bryan Keith by pinfall	Singles match for the Pacific Northwest Heavyweight Championship	9:03
3	Spike Trivet (c) defeated Artemis Spencer by pinfall	Singles match for the PROGRESS World Championship	13:02
4	Vert Vixen (c) defeated Allie Katch, Nicole Matthews and Session Moth Martina by pinfall	Four-way match for the DEFY Women's Championship	11:50
5	Charles Crowley defeated Gringo Loco by pinfall	Singles match	10:04
6	The Bollywood Boyz (Gurv Sihra and Harv Sihra) (c) defeated Matt Cross and Psycho Mike by pinfall	Tag team match for the DEFY Tag Team Championship	10:08
(c) / – the champion(s) heading into the match
