= Progress Chapter 155: Feel The Noize =

2023 Progress Wrestling event

- Promotional poster of the event
- Promotion: Progress Wrestling
- Date: 9 September 2023
- City: Birmingham, England
- Venue: O2 Academy Birmingham

Event chronology
← Previous; Chapter 154: It's Clobberin' Time	Next → Chapter 156: Steal Yourself

The Chapter 155: Feel The Noize was a professional wrestling event produced by Progress Wrestling. It took place on 9 September 2023, in Birmingham, England at the O2 Academy Birmingham.

Eight matches were contested at the event. In the main event, Ricky Knight Jr. defeated Yoshiki Inamura to retain the Progress Atlas Championship.

== Production ==
=== Storylines ===
The event included matches that each resulted from scripted storylines, where wrestlers portrayed heroes, villains, or less distinguishable characters in scripted events that built tension and culminated in a wrestling match or series of matches. Results were predetermined by Progress' creative writers, while storylines were produced on Progress' events airing on the Demand PROGRESS streaming service.

=== Event ===
The event started with the sinlges confrontation between Kid Lykos and Dan Moloney, solded with the victory of the latter via disqualification. Next up, Rhio picked up a victory over Renee Michelle in another singles bout. The third bout saw Bullit outmatching Kid Lykos II. Until the main event, the pay-per-view only featured non-title singles bouts. In the fourth match, Man Like DeReiss defeated Mark Haskins. Next up, Lizzy Evo defeated Session Moth Martina. In the semi main event, PROGRESS World Champion Spike Trivet picked up a victory over Luke Jacobs via disqualification in a non-title bout.

In the main event, Ricky Knight Jr. defeated Yoshiki Inamura to secure the fourth consecutive defense of the Progress Atlas Championship in that respective reign.

== Results ==
No.	Results	Stipulations
1	Dan Moloney defeated Kid Lykos by disqualification	Singles match
2	Rhio defeated Renee Michelle by pinfall	Singles match
3	Bullit defeated Kid Lykos II	Singles match
4	Brian Cage defeated Big Damo	Singles match
5	Man Like DeReiss defeated Mark Haskins	Singles match
6	Lizzy Evo defeated Session Moth Martina	Singles match
7	Spike Trivet defeated Luke Jacobs by disqualification	Singles match
8	Ricky Knight Jr. (c) defeated Yoshiki Inamura	Singles match for the Progress Atlas Championship
(c) / – the champion(s) heading into the match
