= Progress Chapter 151: Heavy Metal =

2023 Progress Wrestling event

- Promotional poster of the event
- Promotion: Progress Wrestling
- Date: 23 April 2023
- City: London, England
- Venue: Electric Ballroom

Event chronology
← Previous; Chapter 150: When The Man Comes Around	Next → Chapter 152: For The Love Of Progress

The Chapter 151: Heavy Metal was a professional wrestling event produced by Progress Wrestling. It took place on 23 April 2023, in London, England, at the Electric Ballroom.

Seven matches were contested at the event. In the main event, Spike Trivet defeated Cara Noir in a Steel cage match to retain the PROGRESS World Championship.

== Production ==
=== Storylines ===
The event included matches that each resulted from scripted storylines, where wrestlers portrayed heroes, villains, or less distinguishable characters in scripted events that built tension and culminated in a wrestling match or series of matches. Results were predetermined by Progress' creative writers, while storylines were produced on Progress' events airing on the Demand PROGRESS streaming service.

=== Event ===
The event started with the four-way bout won by Leon Slater who toppled Danny Black, Lio Rush and Robbie X. Next up, LA Taylor picked up a victory over Session Moth Martina in singles competition. The third bout saw Charles Crowley outmatch Mike Bird in another singles bout. Next up, Millie McKenzie defeated Skye Smitson in singles competition. The fifth match saw Callum Newman and Man Like DeReiss wrestle into a double countout. After brawling, DeReiss teamd up with Dan Moloney and Newman sided with Maverick Mayhew, and fought into the victory of Moloney and DeReiss.

In the main event, Spike Trivet defeated Cara Noir in a Steel cage match to secure the twelfth consecutive defense of the PROGRESS World Championship in that respective reign.

== Results ==
No.	Results	Stipulations	Times
1	Leon Slater defeated Danny Black, Lio Rush and Robbie X by pinfall	Four-way match	8:28
2	LA Taylor defeated Session Moth Martina by pinfall	Singles match	5:48
3	Charles Crowley defeated Mike Bird by pinfall	Singles match	17:32
4	Millie McKenzie defeated Skye Smitson (with Lana Austin and LA Taylor) by pinfall	Singles match	11:09
5	Callum Newman vs. Man Like DeReiss ended in a double countout	Singles match	1:40
6	The 0121 (Dan Moloney and Man Like DeReiss) defeated CPF (Callum Newman and Maverick Mayhew) by pinfall	Tag team match	13:37
7	Spike Trivet (c) defeated Cara Noir by pinfall	Steel cage match for the PROGRESS World Championship	30:02
(c) / – the champion(s) heading into the match
