= Progress Chapter 154: It's Clobberin' Time =

2023 Progress Wrestling event

- Promotional poster of the event
- Promotion: Progress Wrestling
- Date: 26 August 2023
- City: London, England
- Venue: Electric Ballroom

Event chronology
← Previous; DEFY x Progress Toronto	Next → Chapter 155: Feel The Noize

The Chapter 154: It's Clobberin' Time was a professional wrestling event produced by Progress Wrestling. It took place on 26 August 2023, in London, England at Electric Ballroom.

Eight matches were contested at the event. In the main event, Mark Haskins defeated Leon Slater.

== Production ==
=== Storylines ===
The event included matches that each resulted from scripted storylines, where wrestlers portrayed heroes, villains, or less distinguishable characters in scripted events that built tension and culminated in a wrestling match or series of matches. Results were predetermined by Progress' creative writers, while storylines were produced on Progress' events airing on the Demand PROGRESS streaming service.

=== Event ===
The event started with the singles confrontation between Kid Lykos II accompanied by Kid Lykos and PROGRESS World Champion Spike Trivet accompanied by Bullit in a non-title match solded with the victory of the latter. Next up, Paul Robison picked up a victory over Nathan Cruz in singles competition. The third bout saw Lizzy Evo outmatch Kanji in another singles bout. Next up, Kid Lykos defeated Bullit by disqualification. In the fifth match, Charles Crowley, Gene Munny and Simon Miller defeated KC Navarro, Mike Bird and Tate Mayfairs in six-man tag team competition. Next up, Lana Austin defeated Raven Creed to secure the fifth consecutive defense of the Progress World Women's Championship in that respective reign. In the semi main event, All Elite Wrestling's QT Marshall defeated Chuck Mambo to retain the AAA Latin American Championship.

In the main event, Mark Haskins defeated Leon Slater in singles competition.

== Results ==
No.	Results	Stipulations	Times
1	Spike Trivet (with Bullit) defeated Kid Lykos II (with Kid Lykos) by pinfall	Singles match	12:22
2	Paul Robison defeated Nathan Cruz by pinfall	Singles match	10:40
3	Lizzy Evo defeated Kanji by pinfall	Singles match	13:54
4	Kid Lykos defeated Bullit (with Spike Trivet) by disqualification	Singles match	13:52
5	Team Miller (Charles Crowley, Gene Munny and Simon Miller) defeated Team Tate (KC Navarro, Mike Bird and Tate Mayfairs) by pinfall	Six-man tag team match	16:18
6	Lana Austin (c) (with LA Taylor and Skye Smitson) defeated Raven Creed by pinfall	Singles match for the Progress World Women's Championship	13:51
7	QT Marshall (c) defeated Chuck Mambo (with TK Cooper) by pinfall	Singles match for the AAA Latin American Championship	6:58
8	Mark Haskins (with Vicky Haskins) defeated Leon Slater by pinfall	Singles match	15:52
(c) / – the champion(s) heading into the match
