= Progress Chapter 156: Steal Yourself =

2023 Progress Wrestling event

- Promotional poster of the event
- Promotion: Progress Wrestling
- Date: 10 September 2023
- City: Sheffield, England
- Venue: O2 Academy Sheffield

Event chronology
← Previous; Chapter 155: Feel The Noize	Next → Chapter 157: Hungry Like The Wolf

The Chapter 156: Steal Yourself was a professional wrestling event produced by Progress Wrestling. It took place on 10 September 2023, in Sheffield, England at the O2 Academy Sheffield.

Nine matches were contested at the event. In the main event, Dan Moloney, Kid Lykos and Luke Jacobs defeated Dominatus Regnum (Charlie Sterling, Nick Riley and Spike Trivet).

== Production ==
=== Storylines ===
The event included matches that each resulted from scripted storylines, where wrestlers portrayed heroes, villains, or less distinguishable characters in scripted events that built tension and culminated in a wrestling match or series of matches. Results were predetermined by Progress' creative writers, while storylines were produced on Progress' events airing on the Demand PROGRESS streaming service.

=== Event ===
The event started with the tag team confrontation in which Leon Slater and Man Like DeReiss defeated Jude London and Paris De Silva to win the ASCA Tag Team Championship. Next up, Renee Michelle picked up a victory in singles competition over Session Moth Martina. The third bout saw LJ Cleary outmatching Yoshiki Inamura in singles competition. Next up, Brian Cage defeated Mark Haskins in another singles bout. The fifth match saw Bullit picking up a victory over Big Damo. In another singles competition match, Charles Crowley defeated Axel Tischer. Next up, Westside Xtreme Wrestling's Laurance Roman defeated Gene Munny to retain the wXw Shotgun Championship. In the semi main event, LA Taylor defeated Alexxis Falcon in singles competition.

In the main event, Dan Moloney, Kid Lykos and Luke Jacobs outmatched Charlie Sterling, Nick Riley and Spike Trivet in six-man tag team competition.

== Results ==
No.	Results	Stipulations	Times
1	Boisterous Behavior (Leon Slater and Man Like DeReiss) defeated The VeloCities (Jude London and Paris De Silva) (c) by pinfall	Tag team match for the ASCA Tag Team Championship	13:55
2	Renee Michelle defeated Session Moth Martina by pinfall	Singles match	6:38
3	LJ Cleary defeated Yoshiki Inamura by pinfall	Singles match	9:05
4	Brian Cage defeated Mark Haskins (with Vicky Haskins) by pinfall	Singles match	9:18
5	Bullit defeated Big Damo by pinfall	Singles match	12:38
6	Charles Crowley defeated Axel Tischer by pinfall	Singles match	10:13
7	Laurance Roman (c) defeated Gene Munny by pinfall	Singles match for the wXw Shotgun Championship	8:02
8	LA Taylor defeated Alexxis Falcon by pinfall	Singles match	9:55
9	Dan Moloney, Kid Lykos and Luke Jacobs defeated Dominatus Regnum (Charlie Sterling, Nick Riley and Spike Trivet) by pinfall	Six-man tag team match	20:56
(c) / – the champion(s) heading into the match
