= Progress Chapter One: In The Beginning =

2012 professional wrestling tournament by Progress Wrestling

- Promotional poster of the event
- Promotion: Progress Wrestling
- Date: March 25, 2012
- City: London, England
- Venue: The Garage
- Attendance: 323

Event chronology
← Previous; First	Next → Chapter Two: The March Of Progress

The Progress Chapter One: In The Beginning was the inaugural professional wrestling event promoted by Progress Wrestling. It took place on March 25, 2012, in London, England at The Garage.

The event mainly focused on the crowning of the inaugural PROGRESS World Champion via an eight-man single-elimination tournament which featured El Ligero, Noam Dar, Nathan Cruz, Colossus Kennedy, Mike Mason, Colt Cabana, Marty Scurll and Zack Sabre Jr.

== Production ==
=== Storylines ===
The event included matches that each resulted from scripted storylines, where wrestlers portrayed heroes, villains, or less distinguishable characters in scripted events that built tension and culminated in a wrestling match or series of matches. Results were predetermined by Progress' creative writers, while storylines were produced on Progress' events airing on the Pivotshare service as VOD events.

=== Event ===
The event started with the first rounds of the Progress World title inaugural tournament in which El Ligero picked up a victory over Noam Dar. Next up, Nathan Cruz defeated Colossus Kennedy in the second first round match of the same tournament. Ongoing, Mike Mason outmatched Colt Cabana with help from his ringside valet (now real life ex-wife) Becky James in singles competition. In the fourth match, Marty Scurll picked up a victory over Zack Sabre Jr. in another singles competition bout. The semi main event saw Xander Cooper retaining the BWC Scarlo Scholarship Championship, a short-lived independent title in a three-way match against Darrell Allen and Zack Gibson.

In the main event, Nathan Cruz defeated El Ligero, Marty Scurll and Mike Mason in the four-way tournament final match to become the inaugural Progress World Champion.

== Results ==
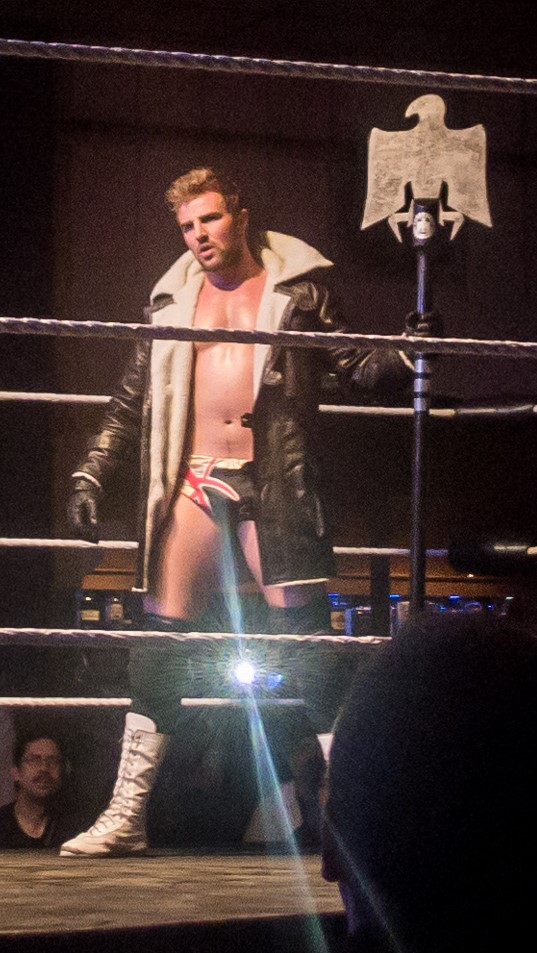
Inaugural champion, Nathan Cruz shown here with the staff representing the title between 2012 and 2014.

No.	Results	Stipulations	Times
1	El Ligero defeated Noam Dar by pinfall	Singles match in the first round of the PROGRESS World Championship Tournament	12:01
2	Nathan Cruz defeated Colossus Kennedy by pinfall	Singles match in the first round of the PROGRESS World Championship Tournament	10:41
3	Mike Mason (with Becky James) defeated Colt Cabana by pinfall	Singles match in the first round of the PROGRESS World Championship Tournament	10:07
4	Marty Scurll defeated Zack Sabre Jr. by pinfall	Singles match in the first round of the PROGRESS World Championship Tournament	21:45
5	Xander Cooper (c) defeated Darrell Allen and Zack Gibson by pinfall	Three-way match for the BWC Scarlo Scholarship Championship	13:44
6	Nathan Cruz defeated El Ligero, Marty Scurll and Mike Mason by pinfall	Four Way Elimination Match in the final of the PROGRESS World Championship Tournament	26:05
(c) / – the champion(s) heading into the match

=== Inaugural Progress World Championship tournament ===
This tournament was held at Chapter One: In The Beginning on 25 March 2012 to crown the inaugural PROGRESS World Champion. It was won by Nathan Cruz.

Tournament bracket

1st Round; Chapter One: In The Beginning; 25 March 2012
Nathan Cruz	Pinfall
Colossus Kennedy	10:41
Noam Dar	12:01
El Ligero	Pinfall
Mike Mason	Pinfall
Colt Cabana	10:07
Zack Sabre Jr.	21:45
Marty Scurll	Pinfall

Final (Note: The tournament final was a four-way elimination match.); Chapter One: In The Beginning; 25 March 2012
Nathan Cruz	Win (Note: Order of elimination: El Ligero, Mike Mason, Marty Scurll)
El Ligero	26:05
Mike Mason	—
Marty Scurll	—
