= Progress Chapter 198: When September Ends =

2026 Progress Wrestling event

Chapter 198: When September Ends
- Promotional poster of the event
- Promotion: Progress Wrestling
- Date: 27 September 2026
- City: Camden, London, England
- Venue: Electric Ballroom

Event chronology
← Previous; Chapter 197: Wrestling Over Everything	Next → Chapter 199: Bonestorm

Chapter 198: When September Ends was a professional wrestling event produced by Progress Wrestling. It took place on 27 September 2026, at the Electric Ballroom in Camden, London, England.

== Production ==
=== Storylines ===
The event included matches that each resulted from scripted storylines, where wrestlers portrayed heroes, villains, or less distinguishable characters in scripted events that built tension and culminated in a wrestling match or series of matches. Results were predetermined by Progress' creative writers, while storylines were produced on Progress' events airing on the Demand PROGRESS streaming service.

=== Event ===
The event started with the tag team confrontation between Ricky Sosa and Daz Black, and Kid Lykos and Kid Lykos II, solded with the victory of the latters. Next up, Bullit picked up a victory over Scotty Rawk in singles comfrontation. The third match saw Raven Creed outmatch Angel Hayze and Myla Grace in three-way competition to become the number one contender for the Progress Women's World Championship. Next up, Tommy Tanner defeated Gene Munny to secure the third consecutive defense of the Progress Atlas Championship in that respective reign. The fifth match saw Nikki Storm and Xelina wrestle into a no-contest in singles competition. Next up, Rhio defeated Steph De Lander to secure the third consecutive defense of the Progress Women's World Championship in that respective reign. In the semi main event, Paul Walter Hauser defeated Trent Seven to secure the sixth consecutive defense of the Progress Proteus Championship in that respective reign.

In the main event, Cara Noir defeated Malakai Black to win the Progress Men's World Championship, ending the latter's reign at 21 days and no defenses.

== Results ==
No.	Results	Stipulations
1	Lykos Gym (Kid Lykos and Kid Lykos II) defeated Ricky Sosa and Daz Black by pinfall	Tag team match
2	Bullit defeated Scotty Rawk by pinfall	Singles match
3	Raven Creed defeated Angel Hayze and Myla Grace by pinfall	Three-way match to determine the number one contender for the Progress Women's World Championship
4	Tommy Tanner (c) defeated Gene Munny by pinfall	Singles match for the Progress Atlas Championship
5	Nikki Storm vs. Xelina ended in a no contest	Singles match
6	Rhio (c) defeated Steph De Lander by pinfall	Singles match for the Progress Women's World Championship
7	Paul Walter Hauser (c) defeated Trent Seven by pinfall	Singles match for the Progress Proteus Championship
8	Cara Noir defeated Malakai Black (c) by pinfall	Singles match for the Progress Men's World Championship
(c) / – the champion(s) heading into the match
