= NWA Illinois Heavyweight Championship =

Details
- Promotion: NWA CCW
- Date established: October 26, 2002
- Current champion(s): J. A. Fair
- Date won: July 11, 2016
Statistics
- First champion(s): Colt Cabana
- Most reigns: Mark Cordova (2 reigns)

The NWA Illinois Heavyweight Championship is a championship defended in the NWA CCW professional wrestling promotion.

== Title history ==
Key
Symbol	Meaning
No.	The overall championship reign
Reign	The reign number for the specific wrestler listed.
Event	The event in which the championship changed hands
N/A	The specific information is not known
—	Used for vacated reigns in order to not count it as an official reign

No.	Champion	Reign	Date	Days held	Location	Event	Notes	Ref(s).
1	Colt Cabana	1	October 26, 2002	882	Grayslake, Illinois	Live event	Defeated Reckless Youth to become the first champion.	
2	Marco Cordova	1	March 26, 2005	(Note: The exact date the championship reign ended is uncertain, which means that the reign lasted between 1 and 82 days.)	Streamwood, Illinois	Live event		
3	Dysfunction	1	2005	(Note: The exact date the championship reign ended is uncertain, which means that the reign lasted between 1 and 83 days.)	N/A	Live event		
4	Marco Cordova	2	June 17, 2005	2,535	Milwaukee, Wisconsin	Live event	Was stripped of the title in 2007 after losing a loser leaves town match, was reinstated as champion in 2010.	
5	Bear St. Pierre	1	May 26, 2012	159	Streator, Illinois	Live event	The title was converted to a Zero One USA title when NWA Midwest was disbanded in a legal dispute with the NWA.	
—	Vacated	—	November 1, 2012	—	N/A	N/A	The promoters of a new NWA affiliate set to open in March 2013 confirm in an interview that Bear St. Pierre would not be retained as champion.	
6	Shane Somers	1	April 27, 2013	56	Jerseyville, Illinois	Live event	Defeated Johnathan Hampton to win the vacant title.	
7	Shane Fury	1	June 22, 2013	328	Swansea, Illinois	Live event	Shane Fury Defeated *ShowTime* Shane Somers for the NWA IL championship.	
—	Vacated	—	May 16, 2014	—	N/A	N/A	Shane Fury was stripped of the title for lack of title defenses	
8	Evan Morris	1	May 17, 2014	329	St. Robert, Missouri	Live event	Evan Morris won an over-the-top-rope battle royal, eliminating Elvis Aliaga, to capture the vacant Championship	
9	Mitch Johnson	1	April 11, 2015	3,619+	Albion, Illinois	Live event	Mitch Johnson won a NO disqualification match over Evan Morris, to capture the vacant NWA Illinois State Championship	
