= Marty Scurll =

English professional wrestler

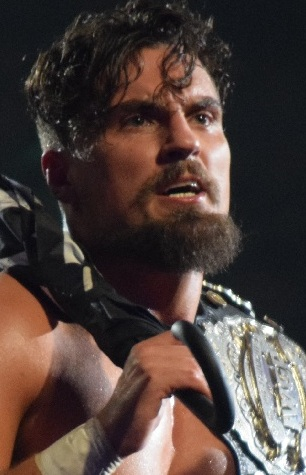
- Scurll in 2017

Personal information
- Born: Martin Scurll; 26 July 1988 (age 38) Littleport, Cambridgeshire, England

Professional wrestling career
- Ring name(s): Marty Scurll; Party Marty; El Villainisto
- Billed height: 5 ft 9 in (1.75 m)
- Billed weight: 195 lb (88 kg)
- Billed from: Cambridge, England
- Trained by: Jon Ritchie; Frank Rimer; Steve Grey
- Debut: February 2005

Martin Scurll (born 26 July 1988) is an English professional wrestler. He currently works on the independent circuit. He is known for his work in Ring of Honor (ROH), Total Nonstop Action Wrestling (TNA), New Japan Pro-Wrestling (NJPW), Revolution Pro Wrestling (RevPro) and Progress Wrestling.

Scurll began his career in 2005, working on the British independent circuit. In 2012, he competed on the show TNA Wrestling: British Boot Camp, where some British wrestlers competed for a tryout with TNA. While working with PROGRESS Wrestling, where he won the World Championship twice, he changed his gimmick to The Villain. His popularity gave him the chance to work on the American independent circuit, working with Pro Wrestling Guerrilla and signed a contract with Ring of Honor in 2016, quickly winning the ROH World Television Championship. During his time with ROH, Scurll also worked with the Japanese promotion New Japan Pro Wrestling, where he became part of the stable Bullet Club and became IWGP Junior Heavyweight Champion and NEVER Openweight 6-Man Tag Team Champion. In 2018, Scurll formed his own stable, Villain Enterprises, winning the ROH World Six-Man Tag Team Championship.

After several wrestlers left ROH to join the promotion All Elite Wrestling, Scurll stayed with ROH and became the head booker in 2020. During the Speaking Out Movement in June 2020, Scurll was accused of taking advantage of an inebriated 16-year-old girl in 2015, leaving the promotion the next year. At the end of 2021, Scurll began to work on several independent promotions.

== Professional wrestling career ==
=== Independent circuit (2005–2019) ===
Marty started training at Frank Rimer's Dropkixx Wrestling Academy which would also produce wrestlers like Martin Stone, The Kartel and Paul Robinson. Marty made his debut for Dropkixx at the Fondu Club in Purfleet, defeating Jimmy Starr by two falls to one. Once under the tutorship of Jon Ritchie, who by this time was in charge at Dropkixx, Marty took part in Dropkixx's Shoot Fighting Tournament. Scurll would go on to win the middleweight tournament, in the process becoming Dropkixx's first middleweight champion. Scurll also competed regularly for Summit Promotions, and at the end of the year formed a tag team with Paul Robinson as 'The Party Boys' (or 'The Midnight Ravers', as they were sometimes billed).

Scurll would go on to appear for Premier Promotions and this would be the place where he would meet Phil Powers, who he ended up wrestling many times in the summer season on the holiday camps circuit. During the rest of the year, Scurll debuted for the likes of IPW:UK and RQW, wrestling Jonny Storm, Taiji Ishimori, Bubblegum and many others. On 5 June 2007, Marty made his debut for All Star Wrestling by defeating Jimmy Starr at Gravesend. Marty competed regularly for All Star, including main eventing Fairfield Halls, Croydon against Pro Wrestling NOAH's Shuhei Taniguchi and Tsutomu Hirayanagi. In IPW:UK, Marty would reform his tag team with Zack Sabre Jr., but under the name The Leaders of the New School. They then feuded with BritRage (Mark Sloan and Wade Flitzgerald) and The Kartel. Scurll wrestled and lost to Doug Williams in IPW:UK's British National Championship Tournament.

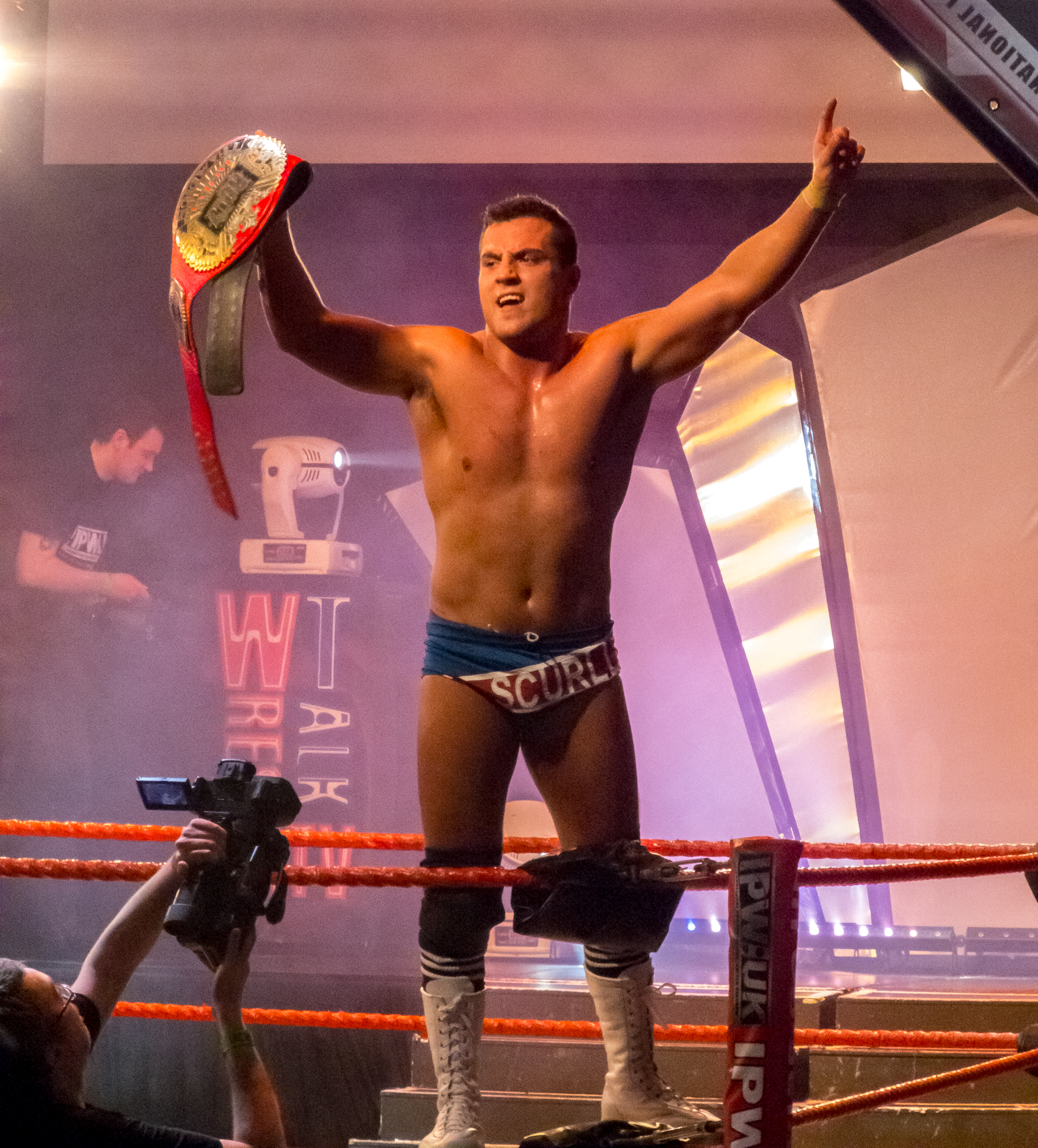
Scurll as the British Cruiserweight Champion in April 2012

In 2009, Scurll and Sabre focused their attention on the IPW:UK tag team division, and picked up a memorable win against tag team champions The Thrillers (Mark Haskins and Joel Redman) during the company's February tour. A highly anticipated rematch finally took place between the teams at the 2009 "Sittingbourne Spectacular" after the Leaders' scheduled opponents had to pull out through injury. This time the championships were on the line, and the Leaders won again to claim their first championship gold in IPW:UK. The feud between the Leaders and the Thrillers became the dominant storyline in IPW:UK through the summer, culminating in the Leaders winning a Tables, Ladders, and Chairs match against their rivals in September. The Leaders have enjoyed an unbroken reign as champions since that time.

Scurll and Sabre competed in the first match of the newly re-launched Frontier Wrestling Alliance in August 2009, beating Northern Xposure (NX) at "New Frontiers". On 28 April 2012, Scurll defeated Sami Callihan in the final of an eight-man tournament to determine the new IPW:UK British Cruiserweight Champion. On 15 March 2014, Scurll defeated Colt Cabana in a 30 Minute Iron Fist match to become Revolution Pro Wrestling (RevPro) Undisputed British Heavyweight Champion. Scurll would go on to successfully defend the championship against the likes of Ricochet, Kevin Steen, Martin Stone, Davey Richards, Doug Williams, Shelton Benjamin, Rocky Romero and others, before losing the title to New Japan Pro-Wrestling (NJPW) wrestler AJ Styles at the 2015 Summer Sizzler event on 14 June 2015.

Scurll debuted for Scotland's Insane Championship Wrestling promotion in late 2014, unsuccessfully challenging Kenny Williams for the ICW Zero-G Championship before continuing to appear for the promotion in 2015, culminating in a main-event non-title loss to reigning ICW World Heavyweight Champion Drew Galloway. Scurll scored his first win in ICW in a four-way match against Noam Dar, Jack Gallagher and Dan Moloney. On 4 April 2015, at a sold-out British Championship Wrestling event in Scotland, Scurll challenged Galloway in a Double Title match for both the Evolve World Championship and the Dragon Gate USA Open the Freedom Gate Championship, but was defeated.

In October 2015, Scurll debuted for Global Force Wrestling (GFW) on their "UK Invasion", losing to GFW Global Champion Nick Aldis in a singles match and teaming with Rampage Brown in a losing effort against Doug Williams and Aldis. Scurll returned to the company in March 2016, unsuccessfully challenging Sonjay Dutt for the GFW NEX*GEN Championship.

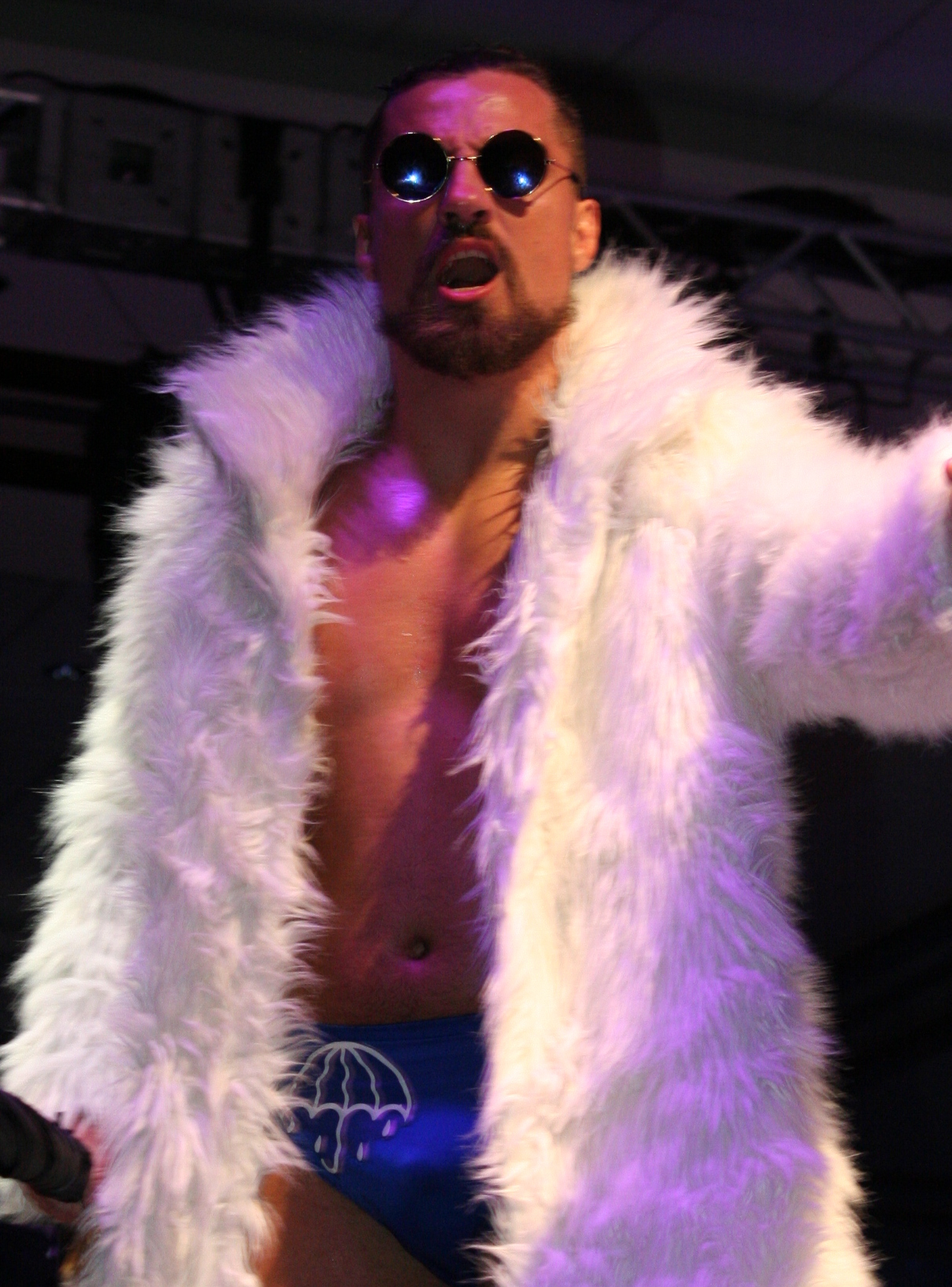
Scurll in March 2017

In early October 2017 at What Culture Pro Wrestling's (WCPW) event Refuse to Lose, Scurll won a triple threat match between Joe Hendry and Will Ospreay and himself to become the sixth and final WCPW champion, before the company rebranded as Defiant Wrestling. On 4 December at Defiant Wrestling's iPPV, titled WeAreDefiant, Scurll was given the new championship belt by General Manager Stu Bennett, and had a confrontation with the debuting Austin Aries at the beginning of the show. In the main event of the evening, Scurll successfully defended the championship in a triple threat match between himself, Joe Hendry and Martin Kirby. However, on 5 December at Defiant's first episode of their new weekly show (uploaded 15 December on YouTube), Scurll lost the championship to Aries, ending his reign at 34 days.

=== Total Nonstop Action Wrestling (2012–2013) ===
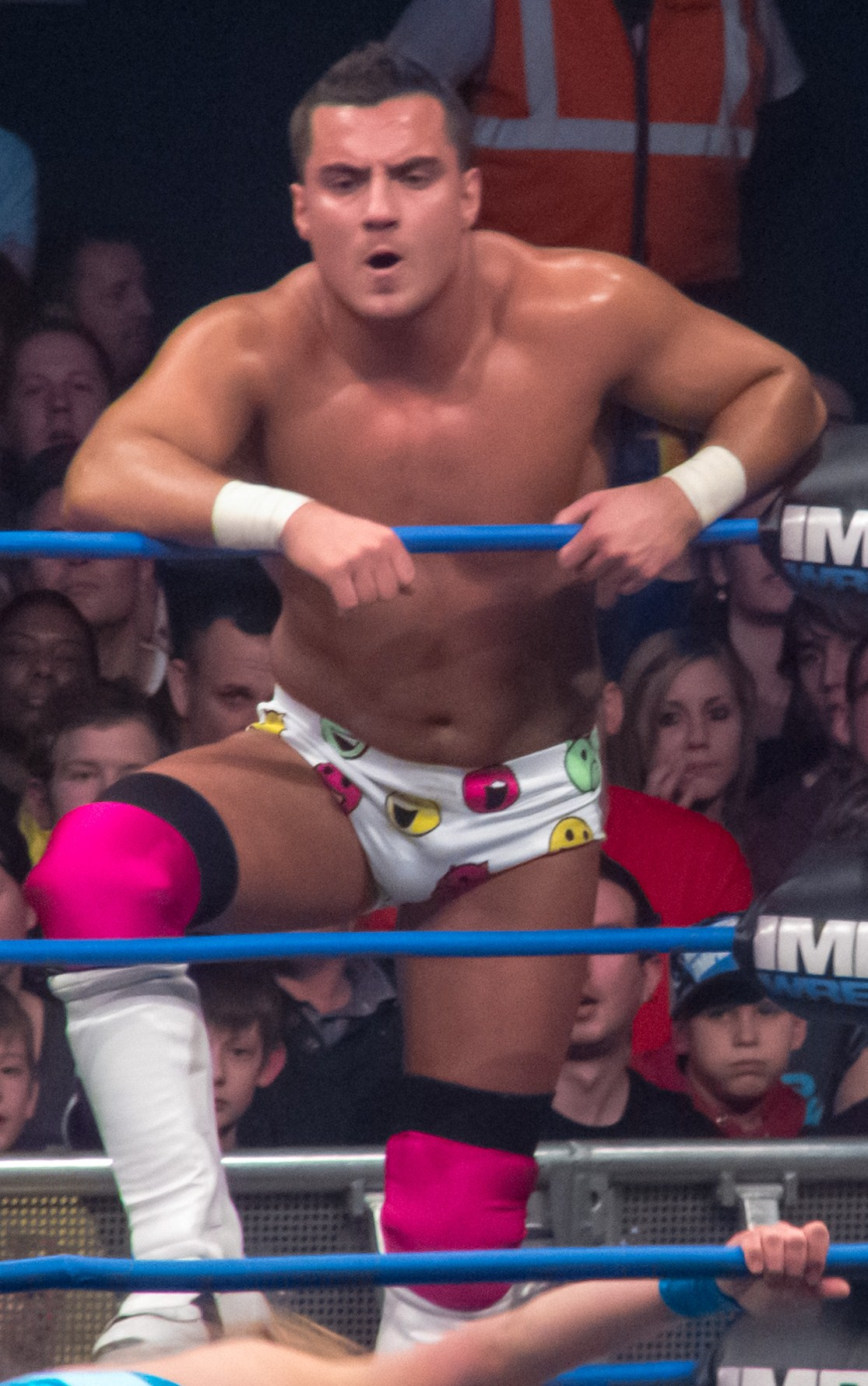
Scurll in January 2013

In late 2012, Scurll began competing in TNA's newest program TNA Wrestling: British Boot Camp that began airing on 1 January 2013 on Challenge. On 14 February edition of Impact Wrestling, he teamed up with The Blossom Twins (Hannah and Holly) to face the team of Jessie Godderz, Tara and Gail Kim. They were defeated after Gail Kim pinned Hannah. During the match, Scurll was injured after performing a suicide dive into the metal railing.

=== Progress Wrestling (2012–2017) ===
Scurll was part of the very first Progress Wrestling show, Chapter One, in a tournament to determine the first ever Progress Champion. He beat Zack Sabre Jr in an acclaimed semi-final match before competing in a four-way match for the title against Mike Mason, El Ligero and winner Nathan Cruz. Scurll went on to challenge Cruz for the title in a Two Out of Three Falls match at Chapter Two, failing to capture the title. Competing regularly for Progress, he was notably part of a four-way match for the Progress Championship at Chapter Twelve, facing Rampage Brown, El Ligero and then-champion Jimmy Havoc, and fighting again for the title at Chapter Eighteen against Will Ospreay, Noam Dar, Dave Mastiff, Paul Robinson and champion Jimmy Havoc.

Scurll reached the quarter-finals of the first Super Strong Style 16 tournament in 2015, beating Eddie Dennis on Day One and Dave Mastiff in the quarter-finals before losing to Zack Sabre Jr on Day Two, and was runner-up to Mark Haskins in the 2015 Thunderbastard match at Chapter Twenty. He lost to Kris Travis at Chapter Twenty-One, Travis' final match before his retirement from wrestling and death from stomach cancer. Scurll turned firmly villainous following this match; gaining a demented mean streak that saw him win the Progress Championship for the first time in a No Disqualification match against Will Ospreay at Chapter Twenty-Five.

Scurll went on to successfully defend the title against Mark Haskins, Chris Hero, and Tommy End in singles competition and against seven opponents in the 2016 Thunderbastard match which he won. He was the first Progress Champion to defend the title overseas – successfully defending the belt against Will Ospreay at WrestleCon SuperShow 2016 in Dallas, Texas, and against Zack Gibson in Italy for Power Wrestling Entertainment. Scurll lost the title to Pastor William Eaver at Chapter Thirty-Two and regained it a month later at Chapter Thirty-Three, making him the first person to ever win the Progress Championship more than once. After successfully defending the belt against Mark Andrews at Chapter Thirty-Five, Scurll lost the Progress Championship to Mark Haskins in a triple-threat main event match also involving Tommy End at Chapter Thirty-Six, PROGRESS' biggest show to date, held at the Brixton Academy in London. During the match, Scurll attacked three referees as he became frustrated at not being able to win; before attacking a fourth official Jimmy Havoc returned to attack Scurll, leading to his loss. At Chapter 38, Scurll failed to regain the Progress Championship in a match that also included Jimmy Havoc. After being disqualified against Havoc at Chapter 39, the two had a No Disqualification at Chapter 40 where Scurll lost.

In 2017 Scurll returned to Progress on Chapter 55 being defeated by Zack Sabre Jr.

=== Pro Wrestling Guerrilla (2015–2018) ===
Scurll made his PWG debut at the 2015 Battle of Los Angeles, where he beat Rich Swann in round one, Trevor Lee in the quarter-finals and lost to Zack Sabre Jr. in the semi-finals. Scurll then suffered a string of singles losses; losing to Ricochet at All Star Weekend 11 Night One and to Timothy Thatcher on Night Two, to Kyle O'Reilly on All Star Weekend 12 Night One and to Chuck Taylor on Night Two. At Prince, he won a match against Mark Andrews and at Thirteen, gained victory over Sami Callihan. In September, Scurll participated the 2016 Battle of Los Angeles, defeating Pentagón Jr. in the first round, Cody Rhodes in the quarterfinals, Mark Haskins in the semifinals, and both Will Ospreay and Trevor Lee in a three-way elimination final to win the tournament.

On 18 February 2017, Scurll reunited with Sabre, as they attacked Chuck Taylor, only to see Trent? come to Taylor's defence. At PWG Mystery Vortex V on 12 January 2018 Marty was defeated by Trent?.

=== Ring of Honor (2016–2021) ===
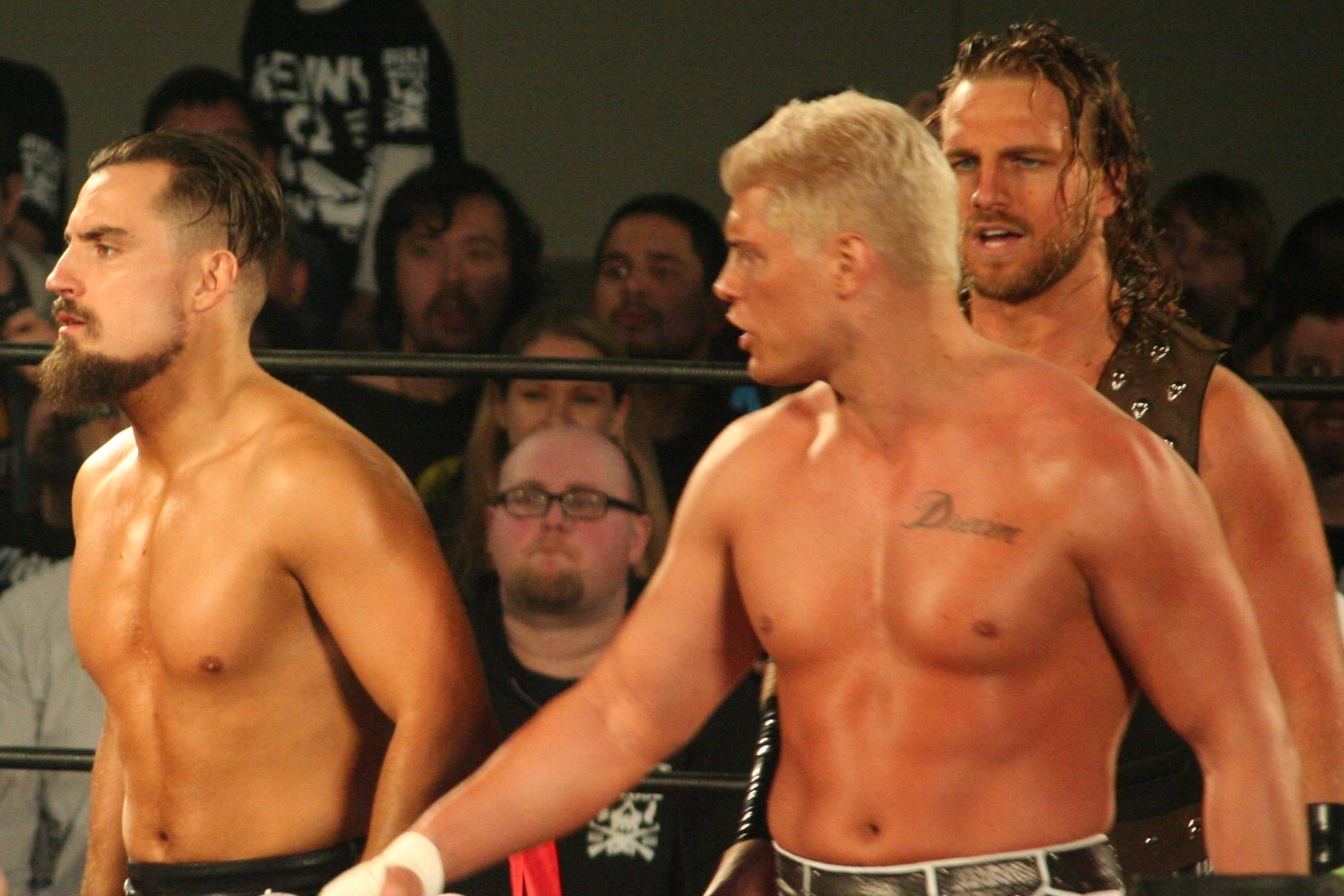
Scurll (left) with fellow Bullet Club members Cody and Hangman Page in 2018

On 22 August 2016, the American Ring of Honor (ROH) promotion announced Scurll's upcoming debut for the promotion. Pro Wrestling Torch reported that Scurll had signed with the company after giving his notice to Evolve the previous month. Scurll made his ROH debut during the promotion's three-day tour of the United Kingdom in November. On 20 November, during the final day of the tour, Scurll defeated Will Ospreay to win the ROH World Television Championship. Scurll successfully defended his newly won title against previous champion Ospreay and Dragon Lee in a triple threat match at ROH's biggest pay-per-view, Final Battle 2016. The beginning of 2017 saw Scurll make many successful defences of his title against Juice Robinson, Donovan Dijak, Sonjay Dutt, Lio Rush and Adam Cole. During a successful defence against Frankie Kazarian, both Hangman Page and the returning Matt Sydal returned. On 29 April 2017 at ROH Masters of the Craft Scurll successful retained the ROH World Television Championship against Ken Anderson.

On 12 May 2017, during the third night of the NJPW and ROH co-produced War of the Worlds tour, Scurll was revealed as the newest member of Bullet Club, replacing Adam Cole. Two days later, on the final night of the tour, Scurll lost the ROH World Television Championship to Kushida, following a distraction from Cole.

The Elite, minus Scurll, left ROH after 14 December 2018's Final Battle pay-per-view. During an in-ring promo at the following night's television tapings in Philadelphia, Scurll would be confronted by The Kingdom, which led the former to unveil his new stable, Villain Enterprises, with Brody King and PCO. A brawl ensued which ended with Villain Enterprises standing tall.

At the ROH 17th Anniversary Show, Scurll defeated Kenny King, and the following night during the Ring of Honor Wrestling tapings, Scurll, King, and PCO defeated the Kingdom to win the ROH World Six-Man Tag Team Championship for the first time.

In January 2020, Scurll signed a multi-year contract with ROH, becoming the head booker of the promotion in the process.

In June 2020, ROH subsequently announced that they had launched an investigation concerning the allegations of Scurll taking advantage of a 16-year old girl while both of them were intoxicated. Scurll did not take part in TV tapings after ROH returned from a hiatus due to the COVID-19 pandemic, and his profile was removed from the company's website in October. In January 2021, ROH announced that Scurll was no longer under contract after the two parties mutually agreed to part ways.

=== New Japan Pro-Wrestling (2017–2020) ===
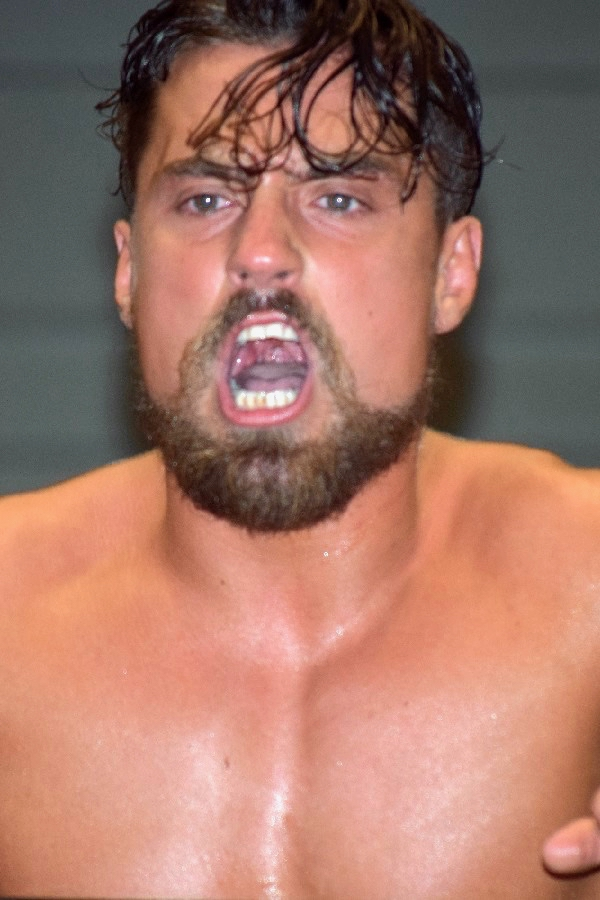
Scurll at the 2017 Best of the Super Juniors

On 3 May 2017, New Japan Pro-Wrestling (NJPW) announced Scurll as a participant in the 2017 Best of the Super Juniors tournament. He finished the tournament with a record of four wins and three losses, failing to advance to the finals. On 5 November at Power Struggle, Scurll defeated Will Ospreay to become the new IWGP Junior Heavyweight Champion. On 4 January 2018, Scurll lost the title to back to Ospreay at Wrestle Kingdom 12 in Tokyo Dome in a four-way match, also involving Hiromu Takahashi and Kushida. On 1 April, Scurll failed to regain the title from Ospreay at Sakura Genesis.

On 3 May, at Wrestling Dontaku 2018, he and the Young Bucks defeated Bad Luck Fale, Tama Tonga and Tanga Loa to win the NEVER Openweight Six Man Tag Team Championship. On 3 May, NJPW announced Scurll as a participant in the 2018 Best of the Super Juniors tournament. Like the previous year, he finished the tournament with a record of four wins and three losses, failing to advance to the finals. On 12 August, at the G1 Climax Finals, Scurll and the Young Bucks lost the NEVER Openweight Six Man Tag Team Championship to Bullet Club OG's Tama Tonga, Tanga Loa, and Taiji Ishimori. Scurll, Hangman Page and Yujiro Takahashi represented The Elite in the pre-show gauntlet at Wrestle Kingdom 13 for NEVER Openweight Six Man Championship number one contendership. They were the first team eliminated. Scurll returned to NJPW for the first time since Wrestle Kingdom on the New Beginning in USA event on 30 January 2019. Scurll also participated in the Best of the Super Junior XXVI tournament, ending with 10 points.

=== National Wrestling Alliance (2019–2020) ===
On 14 December 2019, Scurll made a surprise appearance on NWA's Into the Fire following a NWA Championship match between Nick Aldis and James Storm. He was scheduled to face Aldis for the NWA Worlds Heavyweight Championship at the Crockett Cup on April 19, 2020, but was forced to cancel the event because of the COVID-19 pandemic.

=== Return to independent circuit (2021–present) ===
On September 22, 2021, Puerto Rican promotion CWA announced Scurll would take part in their Halloween Fan Fest event on October 23 in his first wrestling appearance in over a year. The match, which was against Star Roger, was Scurll's first since the accusations made against Scurll during the Speaking Out movement in June 2020. Prior to the event, Scurll told Contralona that he would be working in Puerto Rico and CWA long term. He also made appearances at a Polish promotion, Prime Time Wrestling in February and November 2022. Scurll made his return to Japan in 2025 with the promotion Pro Wrestling HEAT UP!. As of 2026, Scurll continues to wrestle on various independent promotions .

=== Lucha Libre AAA Worldwide (2023–2024) ===
On August 29, 2023, Scurll posted a promotional video on his YouTube channel announcing that he was returning to the Mexican promotion, Lucha Libre AAA Worldwide (AAA). Scurll last wrestled for AAA in August 2024.

== Other media ==
In 2012, Scurll appeared on UK dating game show Take Me Out, in which he attempted to find a woman to take on a date with him. His appearance on the show contained vignettes which also featured fellow British professional wrestler Jimmy Havoc.

== Sexual misconduct allegations ==
During the Speaking Out Movement in June 2020, Scurll was accused of taking advantage of an inebriated 16-year-old girl in 2015. Scurll released two statements in which he did not deny the allegations, but claimed the encounter was consensual and they had met at a pub, and was not aware of her age. ROH subsequently announced that they had launched an investigation concerning the allegations and later removed Scurll from the company.

== Championships and accomplishments ==
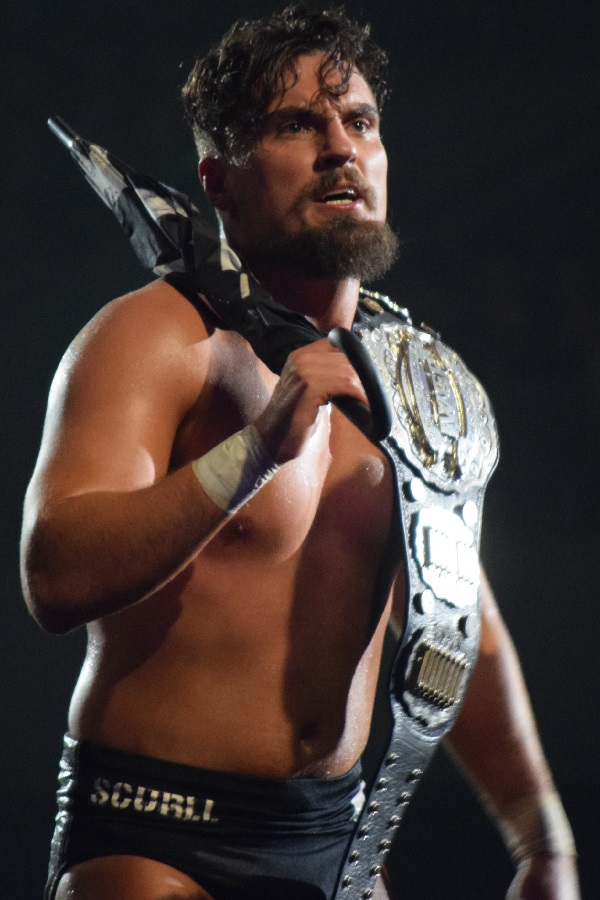
Scurll as the IWGP Junior Heavyweight Champion in November 2017

- CWA Puerto Rico
  - CWAPR Acción Vibrante Championship (1 time)
- Dansk Pro Wrestling
  - DPW Light Heavyweight Championship (1 time)
- DDT Pro-Wrestling
  - Ironman Heavymetalweight Championship (1 time)
- Destiny World Wrestling
  - Destiny World Championship (1 time)
- Dropkixx Wrestling
  - IWC Middleweight Championship (1 time)
  - IWC Middleweight Title Tournament (2005)
  - Best Babyface Award (2005)
- Federacion Universitaria de Lucha Libre
  - Chilean National Undisputed Championship (1 time)
- Fight! Nation Wrestling
  - FNW British Championship (1 time)
- International Pro Wrestling: United Kingdom
  - British Cruiserweight Championship (1 time)
  - IPW:UK Tag Team Championship (2 times) – with Zack Sabre Jr.
  - IPW:UK British Cruiserweight Championship Tournament (2012)
  - Selsey Cup (2012)
  - Extreme Measures (2012)
- Melbourne City Wrestling
  - MCW Invitational Tournament (2016)
- New Japan Pro-Wrestling
  - IWGP Junior Heavyweight Championship (1 time)
  - NEVER Openweight 6-Man Tag Team Championship (1 time) – with Nick and Matt Jackson
- NWA Fight! Nation
  - NWA British Championship / FNW British Championship (1 time)
  - NWA British Championship Tournament (2015)
- Project X Wrestling
  - Project X Wrestling World Heavyweight Championship (1 time, current)
- Pro Wrestling Guerrilla
  - Battle of Los Angeles (2016)
- Pro Wrestling HEAT UP
  - HEAT UP Universal Championship (1 time, current)
- Pro Wrestling Illustrated
  - Ranked him No. 31 of the top 500 singles wrestlers in the PWI 500 in 2017
- Progress Wrestling
  - Progress World Championship (2 times)
  - Thunderbastard (2016)
- Revolution Pro Wrestling
  - British Cruiserweight Championship (1 time)
  - British Heavyweight Championship (1 time)
  - Undisputed British Tag Team Championship (2 times) – with Zack Sabre Jr.
  - Extreme Measures Tournament (2013)
  - First Triple Crown Champion
- Ring of Honor
  - ROH World Six-Man Tag Team Championship (1 time) – with Brody King and PCO
  - ROH World Television Championship (1 time)
  - Survival of the Fittest (2018)
  - ROH Year-End Award (3 times)
    - Best Final Battle Entrance (2017)
    - Faction of the Year (2019) – with Villain Enterprises
    - Match of the Year (2019) vs. Jay Lethal and Matt Taven at G1 Supercard
- Southside Wrestling Entertainment
  - SWE Speed King Championship (1 time)
  - Speed King Title Tournament (2012)
- Swiss Wrestling Entertainment
  - SWE Tag Team Championship (1 time) – with Maik Tuga
- Ultimate Pro Wrestling
  - UPW Heavyweight Championship (1 time)
  - UPW Heavyweight Title Tournament (2015)
- Unlimited Wrestling
  - Unlimited Championship (1 time)
- Westside Xtreme Wrestling
  - wXw Unified World Wrestling Championship (1 time)
- What Culture Pro Wrestling / Defiant Wrestling
  - WCPW/Defiant Championship (1 time)
- World Series Wrestling
  - WSW World Championship (1 time, unrecognised)
  - WSW World Tag Team Championship (1 time) – with Brody King
- Wrestling Superstar
  - Wrestling Superstar National Championship (1 time)
