= Colt Cabana =

American professional wrestler (born 1980)

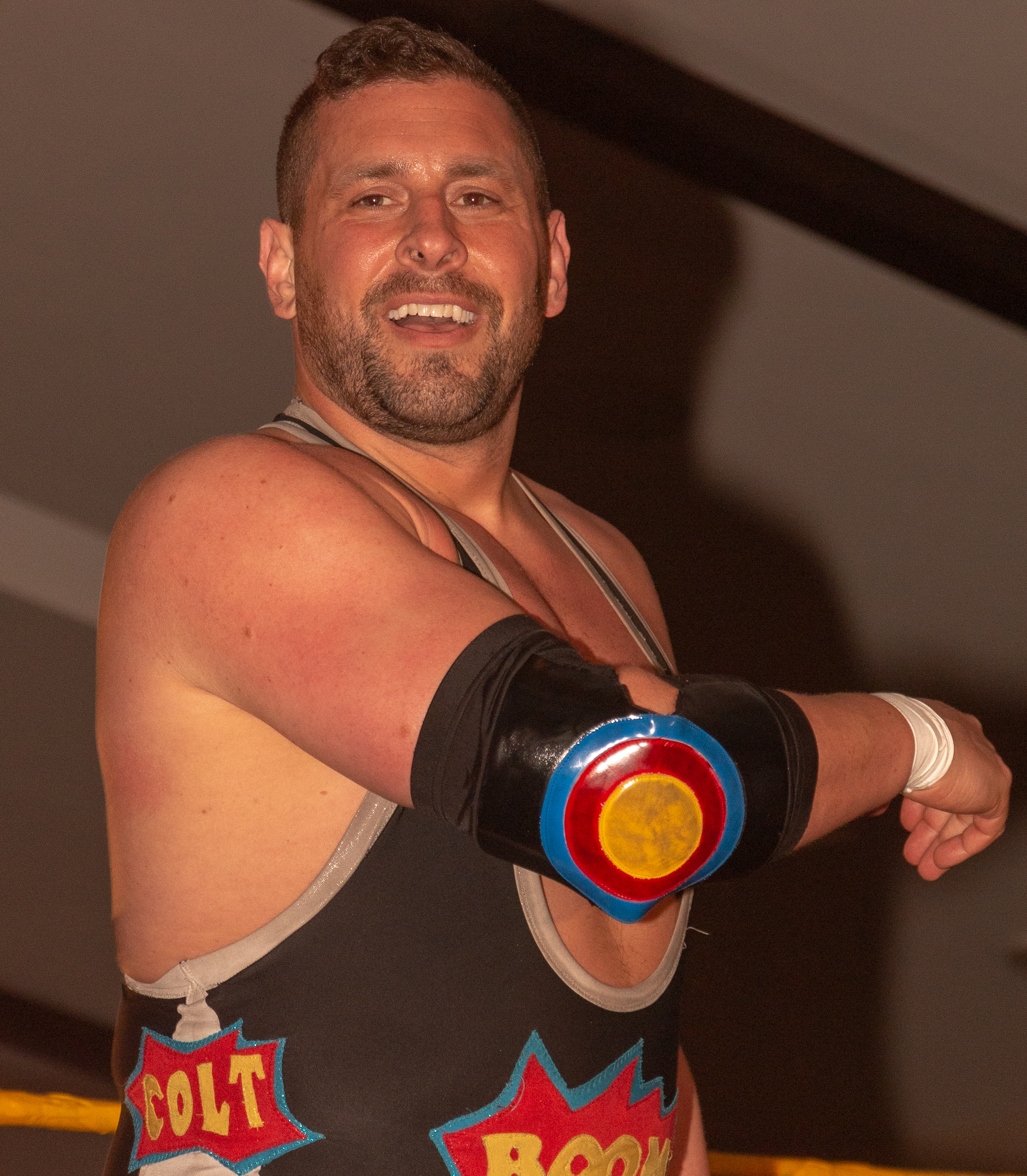
- Cabana in 2018

Personal information
- Born: Scott Colton; May 6, 1980 (age 46) Deerfield, Illinois, U.S.
- Education: Western Michigan University
- Website: coltcabana.com

Professional wrestling career
- Ring name(s): Chris Guy; Colt Cabana; Colt Nevada; Goon #1; Matt Classic; Masked Fipper #7; Officer Colt Cabana; Officer Jack Offerson; Punchline; Scott Colton; Scotty Goldman; Twinkie the Kid
- Billed height: 6 ft 1 in (1.85 m)
- Billed weight: 233 lb (106 kg)
- Billed from: Chicago, Illinois; Maxwell Street in Chicago, Illinois
- Trained by: Ace Steel; Danny Dominion; Kevin Quinn
- Debut: June 19, 1999

Scott Colton (born May 6, 1980), better known by the ring name Colt Cabana, is an American professional wrestler, color commentator, and podcaster. He is signed to All Elite Wrestling (AEW) as a wrestler and as a coach, and he performs the same duties for AEW's sister promotion Ring of Honor (ROH). He also makes appearances on the independent circuit.

Cabana began competing routinely for Steel Domain Wrestling throughout 2000 and 2001 in St. Paul, Minnesota, often teaming with or facing rival and later friend CM Punk. He made a name for himself when he joined ROH, where he was placed in a rivalry with Punk before uniting with Punk and Ace Steel to form the Second City Saints. He later formed a tag team with Punk, which led to him becoming a two-time ROH World Tag Team Champion. He also had rivalries with Homicide and then-World Champion Bryan Danielson.

Cabana was a part of the short-lived Wrestling Society X on MTV in late 2006, where he portrayed his old-school wrestling persona, the masked "Matt Classic". In 2007, he left ROH to wrestle in Ohio Valley Wrestling (OVW), WWE's developmental territory, where he became a one-time Television Champion and a two-time Southern Tag Team Championship. He made several appearances as Scotty Goldman with WWE on its SmackDown brand before being released from his contract in 2009. Cabana is also known for his tenures with the National Wrestling Alliance (NWA), where former two-time NWA World Heavyweight Champion and two-time NWA National Champion and Revolution Pro Wrestling (Revpro), where former one-time RevPro British Heavyweight Champion. He is also known for his time in Chikara.

== Early life ==
Scott Colton was born into a Jewish family in Deerfield, Illinois, on May 6, 1980. He attended Western Michigan University, and was a member of the football team for one season, until graduating in 2002 with a degree in business marketing.

== Professional wrestling career ==
=== Ring of Honor (2002–2007) ===
Scott Colton was trained by Ace Steel & Danny Dominion. He broke into Ring of Honor with the name Colt Cabana as CM Punk's rival before joining with Steel and Punk as the Second City Saints. Cabana and Punk later became two–time ROH Tag Team Champions. With Punk becoming a singles star, Cabana feuded with Austin Aries and Nigel McGuinness. On August 13, 2005, Cabana defeated Punk in a two out of three falls match in their hometown of Chicago in what was supposed to be Punk's last ROH match before going to World Wrestling Entertainment.

Between August 2005 and April 2006, Cabana was involved in a feud with Homicide, which featured Cabana being strangled with a metal coat hanger, bleeding from numerous chair shots, having Drāno poured down his throat, being piledriven off the ring apron through a table, and getting his head crushed between a ladder. On April 1, 2006, in Chicago, Cabana finally got his revenge and earned the respect of Homicide after a Chicago Street Fight, which saw the feud settled with a handshake and an embrace.

After his decisive victory against Homicide, Colt Cabana challenged the ROH World Champion Bryan Danielson for the World Championship at Ring of Honor's 100th show on April 22, 2006, in Philadelphia. Danielson defeated him in less than five minutes. Feeling he lost the match because he had spent the past eight months "brawling" as opposed to wrestling, Cabana rededicated himself. He eventually earned a rematch against Danielson at Chi-Town Struggle on June 24, though he once again lost. Cabana received one last shot against Danielson for the ROH World Championship on August 26. The two fought to a 60-minute time limit draw in a two out of three falls match, with each wrestler earning one fall.

In October 2006, Cabana was involved in an auto accident with fellow Ring of Honor stars Adam Pearce and Dave Prazak. Cabana was driving from a Ring of Honor event in Dayton, Ohio when he lost control of their car due to the weather conditions. The car was totaled but everyone was wearing seat belts, which saved their lives. It was initially reported that Cabana had to have a toe amputated, though he had only bruised it. Despite the injury, Cabana wrestled the next night in Chicago Ridge, Illinois. Pearce and Prazak also walked away with only bruises.

On April 3, 2007, it was revealed by the Ring of Honor website that Colton had signed a WWE developmental contract and was to begin working for their developmental territory Ohio Valley Wrestling. At Good Times, Great Memories (named in his honor), held on April 28 in Chicago, Cabana defeated long-time friend and fellow Chicago wrestler Adam Pearce.

=== International competition (2004–2007) ===
In 2004 and 2005, Colton went on extensive tours of Europe, competing in Scotland, Germany and France, but mainly England. He received the 2004 Match of the Year in a European rounds style bout with World of Sport journeyman, Johnny Kidd. Cabana also did a short tour of Puerto Rico for IWA PR in early 2005. During 2006, Cabana became a popular wrestler in the British promotion 1 Pro Wrestling (1PW), often tag teaming with Darren Burridge as Team SHAG (Street Hooligans Adventure Gang). During 1PW's first anniversary show Team SHAG won the 1PW Tag Team Championship during a three-way ladder match against the defending champions Jonny Storm and Jody Fleisch, and the Southern Comfort team of Tracey Smothers and Chris Hamrick.

Cabana also made his Japanese debut for Zero 1 Max in 2006. In a later tour, he formed an alliance with Steve Corino and Yoshi, known as the P Force Men, which wore all pink outfits. Colt's also appeared and wrestled for Ireland's Irish Whip Wrestling, Austria's Rings of Europe and various Montreal & Toronto Canadian independents. Colton's final European appearance as an independent wrestler took place at UK promotion 1PW on April 6, 2007, where he, along with fellow Team SHAG member Darren Burridge, successfully defended the 1PW Tag Team Championship against Doug Williams and Nigel McGuinness, before formally retiring his half of the title.

=== Wrestling Society X (2006) ===
In November 2006, Colton taped several matches for Wrestling Society X (WSX), a wrestling series on MTV. He competed under the name Matt Classic, who is a throwback to the wrestlers of the 1950s and 1960s. His gimmick used "old school" moves such as the skull vice and the abdominal stretch as finishers. To further enhance his gimmick as an old school wrestler, his WSX profile listed him as having won the Heavyweight Championship in 1952 (28 years before he was born).

=== World Wrestling Entertainment (2005, 2006, 2007–2009) ===
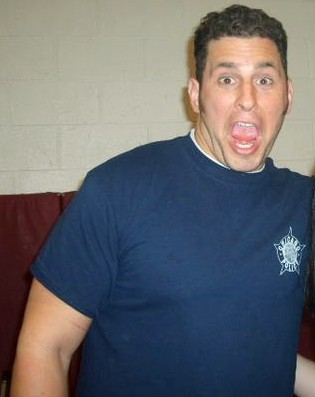
Cabana in Ohio Valley Wrestling in 2007

In 2005 and 2006, Colton wrestled a number of preliminary matches in World Wrestling Entertainment (WWE), starting out on its Heat and Velocity shows. On one occasion, he competed under the name Chris Guy, the real name of his trainer Ace Steel. The real Chris Guy wrestled in a match for WWE in 2004 under the name of Scott Colton, Colton's real name.

On April 3, 2007, it was announced that Colton had signed a contract with WWE. He was assigned to Ohio Valley Wrestling, their developmental territory, and made his debut at a TV taping on May 30. Wrestling as Colt "Boom Boom" Cabana, he lost to Michael W. Kruel in the first round of a tournament to determine the opponent against The Miz at an OVW live event on June 8. He won his first match in OVW when he forced the Belgium Brawler to submit with the Chicago Crab on June 23. After helping Al Snow regain the role of OVW Troubleshooter from Kruel, Cabana became involved in the OVW Television Championship picture, defeating champion Shawn Spears by count-out on August 11. Cabana twice came close to winning the title only to be denied by the TV time-limit expiring. Cabana defeated Spears on October 31, 2007, to win the OVW Television title. When OVW was replaced by Florida Championship Wrestling (FCW) as the WWE developmental territory, Cabana was moved down to FCW.

On the August 15, 2008, episode of SmackDown, Colton made his WWE main roster debut as "Scotty Goldman", losing to The Brian Kendrick. On the August 22 episode of SmackDown, Colton was a participant in a 10-man battle royal match to determine a qualifier for the WWE Championship scramble match at Unforgiven, but was eliminated by Curt Hawkins and Zack Ryder. His last singles match on SmackDown was a quick loss against The Great Khali. A show starring Colton premiered on WWE.com as What's Crackin'?, later renamed Good as Goldman, on January 14, 2009. In his first appearance on television in five months, Colton participated in an Elimination Chamber qualifying battle royal on February 6, 2009, but was eliminated first. Colton was released from his WWE contract on February 20, 2009, the same day that his final match for WWE, a loss to Umaga, aired on SmackDown.

=== Return to the independent circuit (2009–2020) ===
On February 21, 2009, Colton made his return to Pro Wrestling Guerrilla at Express Written Consent where he, as Colt Cabana, challenged Chris Hero for the PWG World Championship in a 3-way match which also included Human Tornado. Hero was able to retain his belt by pinning Tornado and afterwards promised Cabana a 1-on-1 shot at the belt. That match took place on April 12 at PWG's hundredth show, where Hero was able to retain his title. On March 14, 2009, he was defeated by Loca Vida at 2CW in Binghamton, New York, in a classic comedy match. On March 20, 2009, he wrestled for Firestorm Pro Wrestling in Cleveland at Rise of the Real Underground 2009 in a match up against J-rocc which he had won. On March 21, 2009, he made his surprise return to ROH. In a tag team match at the 7th Anniversary Show, he teamed with Bryan Danielson to defeat Bison Smith and Jimmy Rave, who was also returning to ROH. On April 25, Cabana received an ROH World Title shot against Jerry Lynn but lost. On June 6, Cabana debuted on Ring of Honor Wrestling, ROH's television program, teaming with Brent Albright. On December 5 in Chicago Austin Aries successfully defended his ROH World Title against Cabana in a steel cage match and as a result Cabana can never again challenge for the title in his hometown.

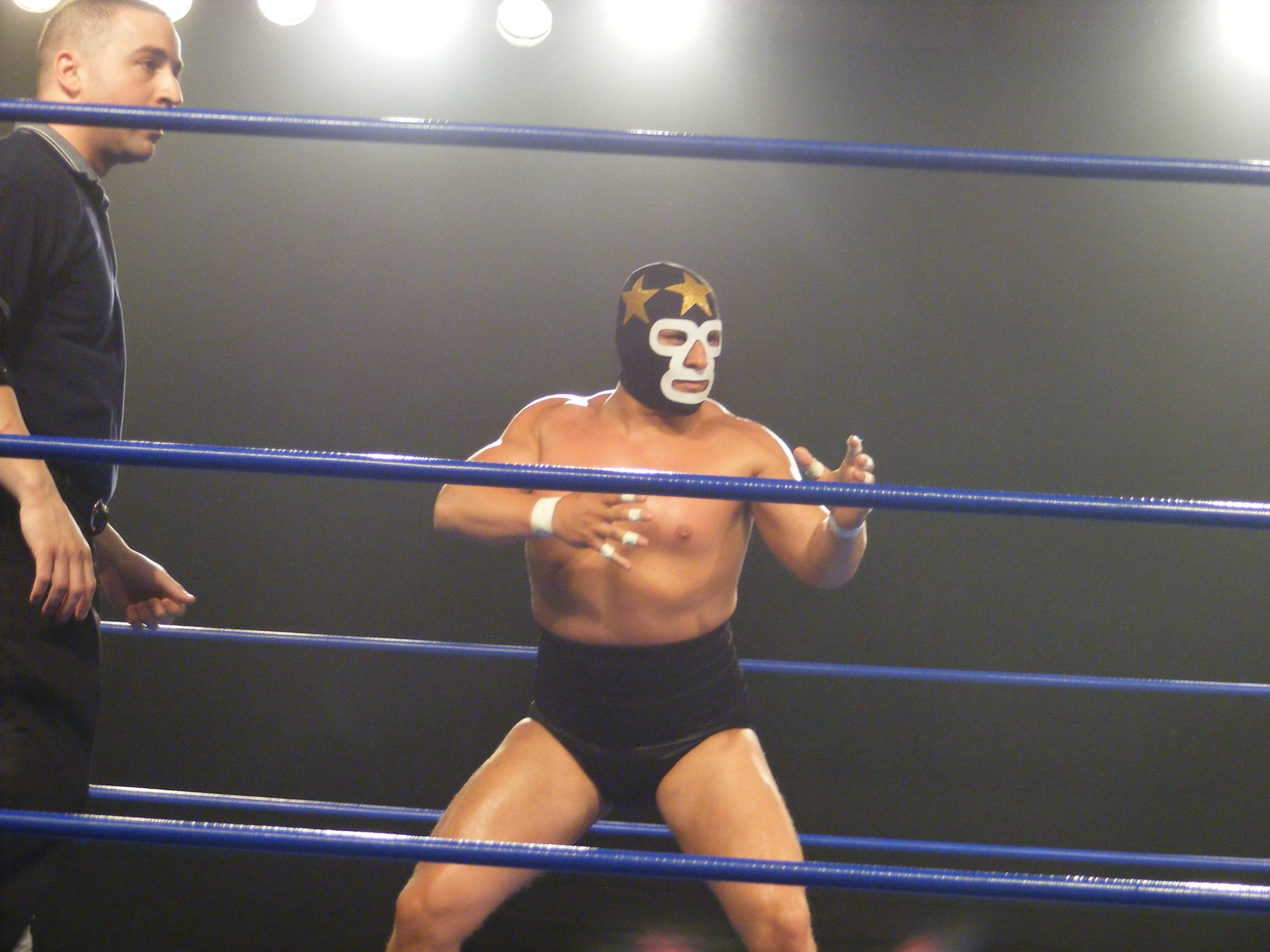
Colton as Matt Classic in April 2010

On February 25, 2010, Chikara announced that Colton was to take part in the 2010 King of Trios tournament in late April, under his Matt Classic persona, teaming up with Dasher Hatfield and Sugar Dunkerton as the Throwbacks. On April 23, the trio of Classic, Hatfield and Dunkerton were defeated in the first round of the tournament by the reigning King of Trios winners F.I.S.T. (Chuck Taylor, Icarus and Gran Akuma). On April 30, 2010, Cabana made his Australian debut. Cabana won a two-day tournament to become the winner of the NHPW Global Conflict Shield. The tournament was held in Perth, Australia. He defeated Balls Mahoney in the finals. On October 23, 2010, Colton won the RCW World Heavyweight Championship from Hank Calhoun. He has since been teaming with El Generico in his feud with Kevin Steen and Steve Corino. On October 16, 2010, Cabana defeated Corino in an "I Quit" match in Chicago Ridge to end their feud. At the September 22 tapings of Total Nonstop Action Wrestling's weekly television program Impact!, Colton, under his Colt Cabana persona, wrestled in a dark match, where he defeated Puma.

On March 6, 2011, Colton (as Cabana) won the NWA World Heavyweight Championship from Adam Pearce at the NWA Championship Wrestling from Hollywood television tapings. He lost the title to The Sheik on April 23, 2011, in Jacksonville, Florida. On March 19 Cabana debuted for NWA Rampage in a World Heavyweight Championship defense against NWA RPW Heavyweight Champion J-Rod. The match ended in a no-contest after interference from Hot Like Lava. Cabana & J-Rod teamed up to defeat Hot Like Lava afterward. On April 2 during the second night of ROH's Honor Takes Center Stage pay-per-view, Cabana started a new feud with House of Truth members Christopher Daniels, Michael Elgin, Roderick Strong and Truth Martini. Colton, as Matt Classic, returned to Chikara on April 15 for the 2011 King of Trios, once again teaming with Dasher Hatfield and Sugar Dunkerton as the Throwbacks. The team was eliminated in the first round by Team Osaka Pro (Atsushi Kotoge, Daisuke Harada and Ultimate Spider Jr.). On July 20, Cabana (as Officer Colt Cabana) defeated 2 Tuff Tony to win the JCW World Heavyweight Championship at Juggalo Championship Wrestling's event Above the Law. He lost the championship to Corporal Robinson at the following event. On August 2, Cabana wrestled a dark match for WWE at a SmackDown taping, losing against Wade Barrett. On August 6, 2011, Cabana tapped out to Ring of Honor World champion Davey Richards in Carrollton, Georgia as part of the 2011 Wrestling Legends Fanfest Weekend activities. On August 20, Cabana wrestled in Aberdeen, Scotland for Wrestlezone, losing a tag team title match. On August 26, 2011, Colt headlined the inaugural show for Preston City Wrestling, joining once again with Darren Burridge as Team SHAG. On October 15, 2011, Cabana made a surprise appearance at All Pro Wrestling's Halloween Hell XIV event in Hayward, California, defeating "Wrestling Personified" Rik Luxury for his APW Worldwide Internet Championship after answering Luxury's open challenge. On November 13, at Chikara High Noon, Cabana faced and defeated Archibald Peck after Colt Cabunny—a character that is a parody of Cabana—turned on Peck and helped his "human counterpart" pick up the win. Cabana and Peck then teamed at Chikara's next iPPV, Chikarasaurus Rex: How to Hatch a Dinosaur, where they were defeated by The Throwbacks (Dasher Hatfield and Mark Angelosetti).

In March 2012 Cabana appeared on Progress Chapter One: In The Beginning, the debut show of London-based promotion Progress Wrestling, in a losing effort to Loco Mike Mason. On April 8, 2012, Cabana defeated Adam Pearce to win the NWA World Heavyweight Championship for the second time. He re-lost the title to Pearce on July 21. Cabana teamed with Eddie Edwards to take part in Global Tag League 2012 and gained five points but did not progress further. On September 14, 2012, Colton returned to his Matt Classic persona as he, Dasher Hatfield and Mark Angelosetti entered the 2012 King of Trios, losing to Team JWP (Command Bolshoi, Kaori Yoneyama and Tsubasa Kuragaki) in their first round match. On October 27, Colton concluded a seven match series against Adam Pearce with a victory leading to Pearce vacating the NWA World Title

=== Return to ROH (2016–2019, 2022) ===
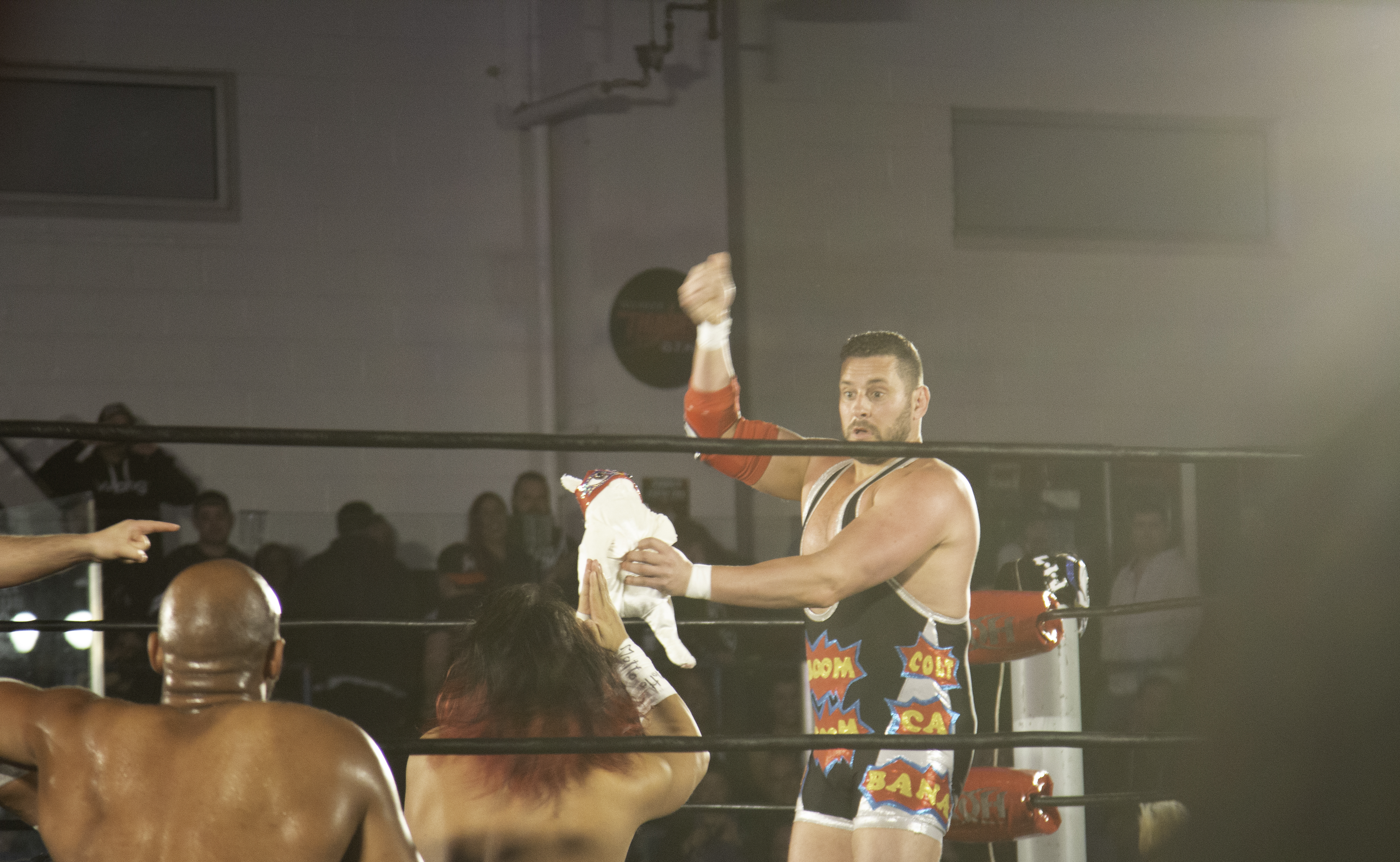
Colt Cabana returned to ROH in 2016 and became a wrestler and commentator.

On April 1, 2016, Cabana returned to ROH at Supercard of Honor X, confronting and challenging ROH World Champion Jay Lethal. Cabana received his title shot against Lethal on May 8 at Global Wars, but the match ended in a no contest, when Bullet Club took over the ring. On September 30, at All Star Extravaganza VIII Cabana and Dalton Castle defeated The All Night Express (Rhett Titus and Kenny King) (with Caprice Coleman), Keith Lee and Shane Taylor and War Machine (Hanson and Raymond Rowe) in a Four Corner Survival tag team match for the #1 contendership to the ROH World Tag Team Championship. On October 14, at Glory By Honor XV night one Cabana defeated Mark Briscoe. The next night Cabana was on Team ROH All-Stars with The Briscoes (Jay Briscoe and Mark Briscoe) and Dalton Castle against the Team ROH Champions (Adam Cole, Bobby Fish, and The Young Bucks (Matt Jackson and Nick Jackson) in an eight-man elimination tag team match that went to a no-contest because Cabana and Castle challenged Matt and Nick Jackson to a ROH World Tag Team Championship match where they were defeated. On the November 19, 2016, edition of ROH's television show, Colt Cabana turned heel by attacking Dalton Castle and splitting up his tag team. At Final Battle Cabana was defeated by Dalton Castle.

On January 1, 2017, Cabana became a commentator for Ring of Honor, replacing Nigel McGuinness (while still also wrestling). On the January 7 episode of Ring of Honor Wrestling, Cabana was defeated Chris Sabin, with the help from The Boys. On February 18, episode of Ring of Honor Cabana defeated The Boys in a 1 on 2 Handicap Match. On March 4 at Manhattan Mayhem VI Cabana lost his rematch with Dalton Castle.

On April 15 episode of Ring of Honor Wrestling Cabana was involved in a random draw eight-man tag team match where he teamed with Bobby Fish, Lio Rush, and Hanson as they were defeated by Jay Lethal, Hangman Page, Jay White and Silas Young, where the winners faced each other in a fatal four number one contender match for the ROH World Championship.

On August 13, Cabana challenged Dalton Castle and the Boys for the ROH World Six-Man Tag Team Championship and teamed with The Tempura Boyz (Sho & Yohei) in an unsuccessful effort at winning the championship on August 20. After the match, Cabana shook hands with Castle and the Boys, turning him face. Colt became more active as a color commentator alongside Ian Riccaboni. At the 2019 Crockett Cup, Colt Cabana won the NWA National Heavyweight Championship from Willie Mack. On June 29, 2019, he lost the championship to James Storm but subsequently regained it in a victory on NWA Power. He lost the title to Aron Stevens in a triple threat match also involving Ricky Starks at NWA Into the Fire.

In 2022, he was a judge at Supercard of Honor XV for the ROH Pure Championship. On July 23, at Death Before Dishonor (2022), Cabana defeated Anthony Henry in the pre-show.

=== New Japan Pro-Wrestling (2019–2020) ===
On February 22, 2019, Cabana, alongside plenty of other ROH talent, appeared on Day 1 of Honor Rising: Japan which took place in Korakuen Hall. Alongside Delirious and Cheeseburger, they faced Ryusuke Taguchi, Toru Yano, and Togi Makabe for the NEVER Openweight 6-Man Tag Team Championship, but in a losing effort. The next day, on Day 2 of Honor Rising: Japan, Cabana teamed with Toru Yano and were victorious in a match against Cheese Burger and Delirious. While the ROH talent headed back home after Honor Rising: Japan, Cabana would stay in Japan. On February 25, 2019, he was announced as one of the 32 participants in the New Japan Cup 2019. On March 8, 2019, Cabana stated that he would be making his official NJPW debut Cabana was eliminated from the 2019 New Japan Cup in the quarter-finals by Sanada and on March 24, Cabana stated that he had finished the tour.

=== All Elite Wrestling (2019–present) ===
After making multiple appearances for All Elite Wrestling since 2019, Cabana signed with the promotion in February 2020. He made a surprise appearance at Revolution on February 29, 2020, attacking The Dark Order. In May 2020, Cabana began a losing streak as Brodie Lee tried to recruit him into The Dark Order. On the June 10 episode of Dynamite, after Cabana lost to Sammy Guevara, Lee came out to help Cabana to his feet and once again offer him a spot in the Dark Order. Later that night, Cabana was seen heading into Lee's office. The following week, Cabana was handed an envelope by Lee that stated they will team together against Joey Janela and Sonny Kiss. Cabana and Lee would defeat Janela and Kiss after Cabana pinned Janela. Over the next few weeks, Cabana experienced a winning streak while teaming with members of the Dark Order as he was slowly recruited into the group over time, thus slowly turning heel. Following the death of Brodie Lee, Cabana, alongside the rest of The Dark Order, transitioned into babyfaces. At the Brodie Lee Celebration of Life memorial show, Cabana teamed with The Young Bucks to defeat Matt Hardy and Private Party, securing the pinfall victory. Cabana wrestled his final match as a member of the Dark Order in August 2022.

On the November 2, 2022, episode of Dynamite, Cabana challenged Chris Jericho for the ROH World Championship in a losing effort. In July 2023, it was reported that Cabana had begun working backstage in AEW as a coach. Cabana returned to the ring for AEW in September 2023, forming a new tag team with Brandon Cutler. Over the following months, Cabana and Cutler faced Cabana's former Dark Order stablemates in a series of tag team matches.

== Other media ==
Colt Cabana

Twitch information
- Channel: coltcabana
- Years active: 2020–present
- Genre: Gaming
- Followers: 27,900
- Last updated: September 9, 2024

Colton hosts a podcast called The Art of Wrestling, which has 409 episodes as of September 2024.

On December 23, 2019, RetroSoft Studios announced Riccaboni and Cabana would be providing commentary for the sequel to the 1991 arcade game WWF WrestleFest RetroMania Wrestling on PlayStation 4, Nintendo Switch, Xbox One, and PC.

== Personal life ==
While at Western Michigan University, Colton became friends with Matt Cappotelli, who went on to participate in WWE Tough Enough.

In February 2015, WWE doctor Christopher Amann filed a lawsuit against Colton and long-time friend Phillip Brooks (better known as CM Punk) for comments made during a November 2014 episode of Colton's Art of Wrestling podcast. Amann was seeking roughly $4 million in compensation and an undisclosed amount in punitive damages. In 2018, the case went to trial, where a jury ruled in favor of Colton and Brooks. Later that year, Colton filed a lawsuit against Brooks, alleging breach of contract and fraud due to Brooks' alleged agreement and later refusal to pay Colton's legal fees for the Amann suit. Colton sought $200,000 in damages and an additional $1 million in punitive damages. Brooks filed a counterclaim against Colton for $600,000 and additional fees in June 2019. Both lawsuits were settled and dismissed in September 2019, which PWInsider stated involved no financial compensation.

== Championship and accomplishments ==
- 2econd Wrestling
  - Maxwell Street Heritage Championship (1 time)
- All American Wrestling
  - AAW Heritage Championship (1 time)
- All Pro Wrestling
  - APW Worldwide Internet Championship (1 time)
- All-Star Championship Wrestling / NWA Wisconsin
  - ACW/NWA Wisconsin Heavyweight Championship (1 time)
- All Star Wrestling
  - ASW People's Championship (1 time)
- Championship of Wrestling
  - cOw Manager of Champions Championship (1 time)
- Christian Wrestling Alliance
  - CWA Heavyweight Championship (1 time)
- DDT Pro-Wrestling
  - Ironman Heavymetalweight Championship (2 times)
- Extreme Wrestling Federation
  - EWF Xtreme 8 Tournament (2004)
- F1RST Wrestling
  - World Mitzvah Championship (1 time)
- Figure Wrestling Federation
  - FWF Championship (1 time)
- Frontier Wrestling Alliance
  - Round Robin Tournament (2005)
- Independent Wrestling Association Mid-South
  - IWA Mid-South Heavyweight Championship (1 time)
  - ICW/ICWA Tex-Arkana Television Championship (4 times^{1})
- Insane Championship Wrestling
  - ICW Tag Team Championship (1 time) – with Grado
- Insane Wrestling Federation
  - IWF Heavyweight Championship (1 time)
- International Wrestling Cartel
  - IWC World Heavyweight Championship (1 time)
  - IWC Super Indy Championship (1 time)
  - IWC Super Indy Championship Tournament (2003)
- Juggalo Championship Wrestling
  - JCW Heavyweight Championship (1 time)
- Landmark Wrestling Federation
  - LWF Heavyweight Championship (1 time)
- Legend City Wrestling
  - LCW Heavyweight Championship (1 time)
- Mid-American Wrestling / NWA Mid-American Wrestling
  - MAW Heavyweight Championship (1 time)
- National Wrestling Alliance
  - NWA World Heavyweight Championship (2 times)
  - NWA National Heavyweight Championship (2 times)
- New Horizon Pro Wrestling
  - Global Conflict Shield Tournament (2010)
- NWA Midwest
  - NWA Illinois Heavyweight Championship (1 time)
- Nevermore Championship Wrestling
  - NCW World Heavyweight Championship (1 time)
- Ohio Valley Wrestling
  - OVW Television Championship (1 time)
  - OVW Southern Tag Team Championship (2 times) – Charles Evans (1) and Shawn Spears (1)
  - OVW Southern Tag Team Championship Tournament (2007) – with Shawn Spears
- One Pro Wrestling
  - 1PW Tag Team Championship (1 time) – with Darren Burridge
- Pro Wrestling Illustrated
  - Ranked No. 44 of the top 500 singles wrestlers in the PWI 500 in 2012
- Pro Wrestling Noah
  - Global Tag League Outstanding Performance Award (2015) – with Chris Hero
  - Global Tag League Technique Award (2012) – with Eddie Edwards
  - Global Tag League Technique Award (2014, 2015) – with Chris Hero
- Pro Wrestling World-1 Great Lakes
  - World-1 Great Lakes Openweight Championship (1 time, inaugural)
  - World-1 Great Lakes Openweight Championship Tournament (2006)
- Professional Championship Wrestling
  - PCW State Championship (1 time)
- Revolution Championship Wrestling
  - RCW Heavyweight Championship (1 time)
- Revolution Pro Wrestling
  - RPW British Heavyweight Championship (1 time)
- Revolución Lucha Libre
  - RLL Absolute Championship (1 time)
- Wrestle Circus
  - WC Heavyweight Championship (1 time)
- Ring of Honor
  - ROH Tag Team Championship (2 times) – with CM Punk
- Steel Domain Wrestling
  - SDW Television Championship (1 time)
- Milwaukee Midwest Wrestling
  - MMW Heavyweight Championship (1 time)
- Temple of Wrestling
  - TOW Championship (1 time)
- UWA Hardcore Wrestling
  - UWA Canadian Championship (1 time)
- Monarchy Championship Wrestling
  - MCW Tag Team Championship (1 time) – with Steve Stone
- PWF Northeast
  - PWF Cruiserweight Championship (1 time)
- Wrestling Is Fun
  - Wrestling Is Fun 24/7 Hardcore Championship (1 time)
- Other titles
  - Jewish Heavyweight Championship (1 time, current)
  - Jew North American Championship (1 time)
  - Jewish Tag Team Championship (1 time) – with Brandon Cutler
- ^{1}This is a "gimmick" title defended under the 24/7 rule by Larry Sweeney in a number of independent and regional promotions. Both Cabana and Delirious held the title multiple times during a 3-Way Dance against Sweeney at an IWA Mid-South show on December 30, 2005.

== See also ==
- List of Jewish professional wrestlers
