= Progress Men's World Championship =

Professional wrestling championship

- The Progress Men's World Championship belt

Details
- Promotion: Progress Wrestling
- Date established: 25 March 2012
- Current champion: Cara Noir
- Date won: 27 September 2026

Other names
- PROGRESS Championship (2012 – 2016); PROGRESS World Championship (2016 – 2019, 2021 – present); PROGRESS Unified World Championship (2019 – 2021)
Statistics
- First champion: Nathan Cruz
- Most reigns: Cara Noir (3 reigns)
- Longest reign: Cara Noir (791 days)
- Shortest reign: Mark Andrews (<1 days)
- Oldest champion: Cara Noir (39 years)
- Youngest champion: Nathan Cruz (21 years, 197 days)
- Heaviest champion: Big Damo (321 lb (146 kg))
- Lightest champion: Mark Andrews (159 lb (72 kg))

The Progress Men's World Championship is a professional wrestling world championship created and promoted by the British professional wrestling promotion Progress Wrestling. The current champion is Cara Noir, who is in his record-setting third reign. He won the title by defeating Malakai Black at Chapter 198: When September Ends on 27 September 2026.

== History ==
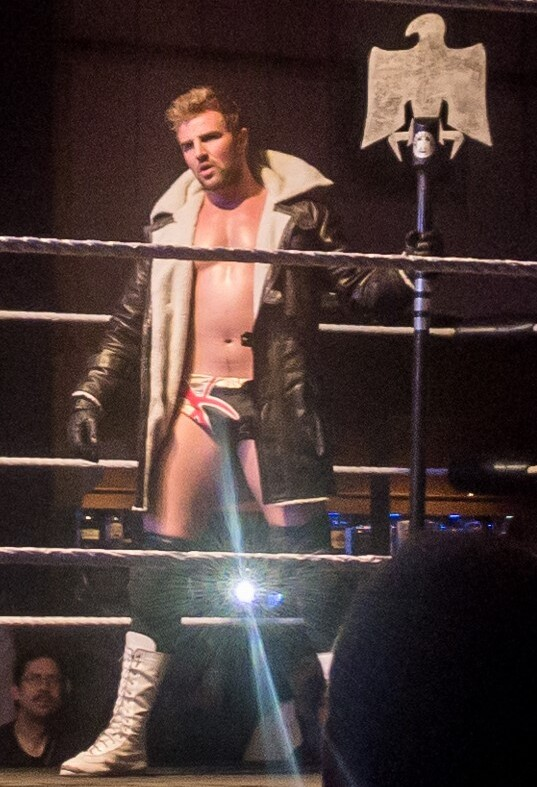
Inaugural champion Nathan Cruz holding the staff that represented the title from 2012 to 2014.

The Progress Championship was created on 25 March 2012. On that date, Nathan Cruz was crowned as the inaugural champion after coming out victorious in the four-way final in the inaugural championship tournament against Marty Scurll, El Ligero, and Mike Mason at Chapter One: In The Beginning.

Unlike most wrestling championships which are conventionally represented by a championship belt, the Progress Championship was originally represented by a large staff with an eagle head piece. At Chapter 16 on 30 November 2014, the staff was replaced by a traditional title belt. The title has been defended in the United States at the WrestleCon Supershow in Dallas, Texas, and subsequently defended in Italy on 30 April and Ireland on 16 July in 2016. On 5 May 2019, the Progress World Championship and the Progress Atlas Championship were unified by Walter after defeating Trent Seven. The title was henceforth known as the Progress Unified World Championship.

=== Inaugural PROGRESS Championship Tournament (2012) ===
This tournament was held at Chapter One: In The Beginning on 25 March 2012 to crown the inaugural PROGRESS World Champion. It was won by Nathan Cruz.

Tournament bracket

1st Round; Chapter One: In The Beginning; 25 March 2012
Nathan Cruz	Pinfall
Colossus Kennedy	10:41
Noam Dar	12:01
El Ligero	Pinfall
Mike Mason	Pinfall
Colt Cabana	10:07
Zack Sabre Jr.	21:45
Marty Scurll	Pinfall

Final (Note: The tournament final was a four-way elimination match.); Chapter One: In The Beginning; 25 March 2012
Nathan Cruz	Win (Note: Order of elimination: El Ligero, Mike Mason, Marty Scurll)
El Ligero	26:05
Mike Mason	—
Marty Scurll	—

== Title history ==
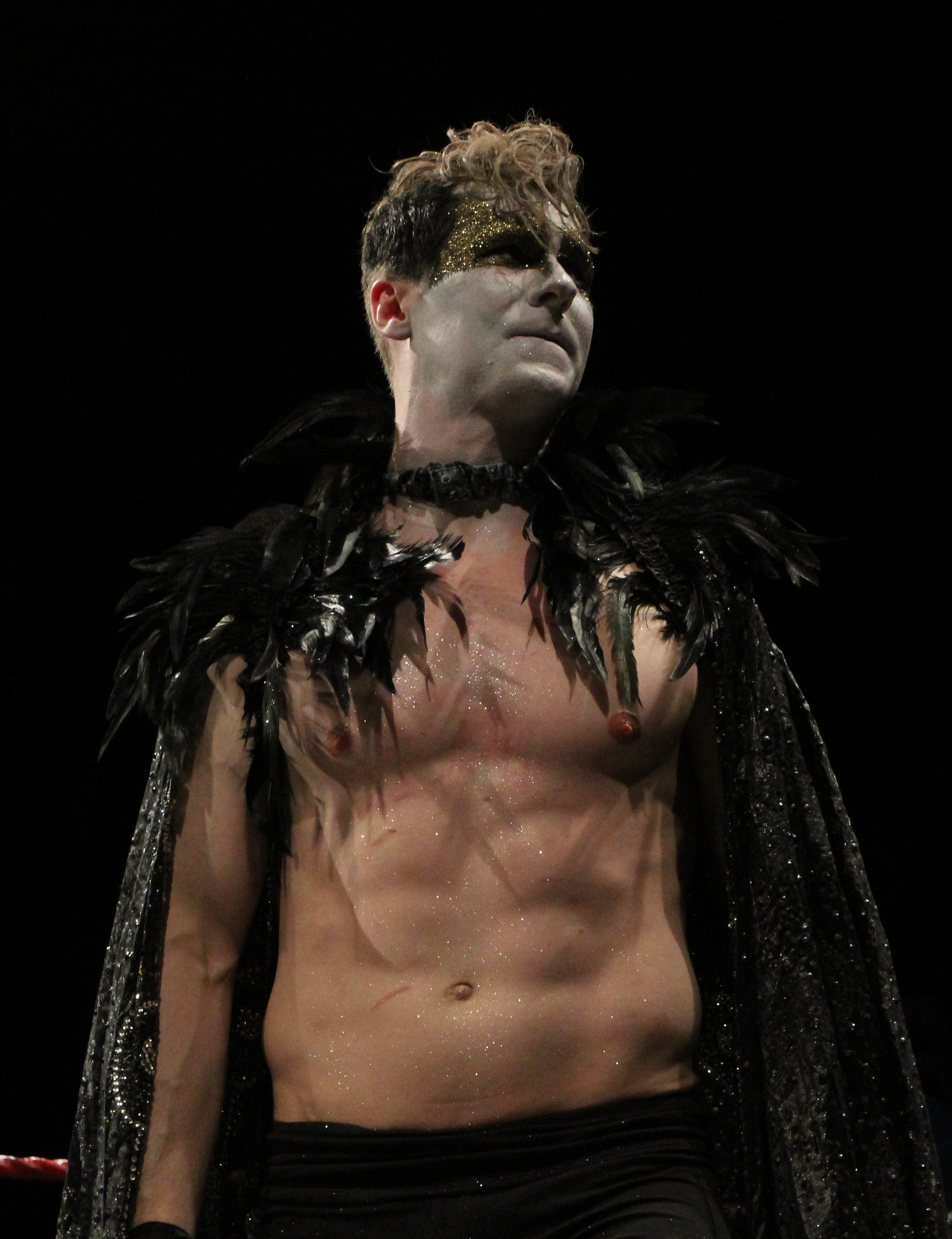
Current and record-setting three-time champion Cara Noir

Overall, there have been 25 reigns among 19 champions and three vacancies. Nathan Cruz was the inaugural and is also the youngest champion, winning the title at 21 years. Cara Noir holds the record for most reigns with three. Noir had the longest reign at 791 days and 17 successful title defences, while Mark Andrews had the shortest reign at less than a day and zero successful title defences. Noir is the oldest champion at 39 years, while Nathan Cruz is the youngest champion at 21 years and 197 days.

Cara Noir is the current champion in his record-setting third reign. He won the title by defeating Malakai Black at Chapter 198: When September Ends on 27 September 2026, in Camden, London, England.

Key
No.	Overall reign number
Reign	Reign number for the specific champion
Days	Number of days held
Defenses	Number of successful defenses
<1	Reign lasted less than a day
+	Current reign is changing daily

No.	Champion	Championship change			Reign statistics			Notes	Ref.
No.	Champion	Date	Event	Location	Reign	Days	Defenses	Notes	Ref.
1	Nathan Cruz	25 March 2012	Chapter One: In The Beginning	Highbury, London, England	1	245	1	Defeated Marty Scurll, El Ligero, and Mike Mason in the four-way tournament final to become the inaugural champion.	
2	El Ligero	25 November 2012	Chapter 4: The Ballad of El Ligero	Highbury, London, England	1	245	3		
3	Rampage Brown	28 July 2013	Chapter 8: The Big Boy's Guide to Strong Style	Highbury, London, England	1	119	2		
4	Mark Andrews	24 November 2013	Chapter 10: Glory Follows Virtue As If It Were Its Shadow	Highbury, London, England	1	<1	0	This was Andrews' Natural Progression Series cash-in match.	
5	Jimmy Havoc	24 November 2013	Chapter 10: Glory Follows Virtue As If It Were Its Shadow	Highbury, London, England	1	609	9	Used the open contract given to him by Jim Smallman for an immediate title opportunity.	
6	Will Ospreay	26 July 2015	Chapter 20: ThunderBastard: Beyond ThunderBastard	Camden Town, London, England	1	182	4	This was Ospreay's Super Strong Style 16 cash-in match.	
7	Marty Scurll	24 January 2016	Chapter 25: Chat Shit, Get Banged	Camden Town, London, England	1	154	7		
8	Pastor William Eaver	26 June 2016	Chapter 32: 5000 to 1	Camden Town, London, England	1	35	1	This was Eaver's Natural Progression Series cash-in match.	
9	Marty Scurll	31 July 2016	Chapter 33: Malice in Wonderland	Camden Town, London, England	2	56	1		
10	Mark Haskins	25 September 2016	Chapter 36: We're Gonna Need a Bigger Room... Again	Brixton, London, England	1	35	1	This triple threat match also featured Tommy End.	
—	Vacated	30 October 2016	Chapter 38: When Men Throw Men At Men	Camden Town, London, England	—	—	—	Mark Haskins vacated the title due to an injury.	
11	Pete Dunne	27 November 2016	Chapter 39: The Graps of Wrath	Camden Town, London, England	1	287	11	Defeated Jimmy Havoc, Matt Riddle, Sebastian, TK Cooper, Travis Banks, and Trent Seven in a seven-way elimination match to win the vacant title.	
12	Travis Banks	10 September 2017	Chapter 55: Chase the Sun	Haringey, London, England	1	318	17	This was Banks' Super Strong Style 16 cash-in match.	
13	Walter	25 July 2018	Chapter 74: Mid Week Matters	Camden Town, London, England	1	417	15	Walter defeated Progress Atlas Champion Trent Seven to unify the titles on 5 May 2019.	
14	Eddie Dennis	15 September 2019	Chapter 95: Still Chasing	Haringey, London, England	1	126	2	This triple threat match also featured David Starr. This was Dennis' title opportunity after defeating Mark Andrews at Chapter 76: Hello Wembley!.	
—	Vacated	19 January 2020	—	—	—	—	—	Eddie Dennis vacated the title due to a shoulder injury.	
15	Cara Noir	19 January 2020	Chapter 101: Dalmatians	Camden Town, London, England	1	791	17	Defeated Ilja Dragunov, Kyle Fletcher and Paul Robinson in a four-way match to win the vacant title.	
16	Jonathan Gresham	20 March 2022	Chapter 130: Dodge, Dip, Duck, Dive, Dodge	London, England	1	56	2	This was a Winner Takes All match in which Gresham defended the ROH World Championship.	
—	Vacated	15 May 2022	Chapter 134: No Mountain High Enough	Camden Town, London, England	—	—	—	Jonathan Gresham was stripped of the title due to interference by Lykos Gym (Kid Lykos and Kid Lykos II) in his title defence against Gene Munny.	
17	Chris Ridgeway	5 June 2022	Chapter 135: Super Strong Style 16; Night 3	Camden Town, London, England	1	69	1	Defeated Warren Banks in the Super Strong Style 16 tournament final to win the vacant title.	
18	Big Damo	13 August 2022	Chapter 137: The Deadly Viper Tour - Codename: Copperhead	Sheffield, England	1	15	2		
19	Spike Trivet	28 August 2022	Chapter 139: Warriors Come Out To Play	London, England	1	546	17		
20	Kid Lykos	25 February 2024	Chapter 163: Twisted Metal	London, England	1	154	3	This was a Steel Cage match.	
21	Luke Jacobs	28 July 2024	Chapter 169: The Devil On My Shoulder	London, England	1	393	13		
22	Man Like DeReiss	25 August 2025	Chapter 183: Hundred Volts	London, England	1	251	15	This was a Tables, Ladders and Chairs match.	
23	Cara Noir	3 May 2026	Chapter 194: Super Strong Style 16	London, England	2	126	2	This was a no disqualification match.	
24	Malakai Black	6 September 2026	The Odyssey Tour; Night 3	Manchester, England	1	21	0		
25	Cara Noir	27 September 2026	Chapter 198: When September Ends	Camden, London, England	3	28+	0		

== Combined reigns ==
As of 25 October 2026.

†	Indicates the current champion

Rank	Wrestler	No. of reigns	Combined defenses	Combined days
1	Cara Noir †	3	19	944+
2	Jimmy Havoc	1	9	609
3	Spike Trivet	1	17	546
4	Walter	1	15	417
5	Luke Jacobs	1	13	393
6	Travis Banks	1	17	318
7	Pete Dunne	1	11	287
8	Man Like DeReiss	1	15	251
9	El Ligero	1	3	245
9	Nathan Cruz	1	1	245
11	Marty Scurll	2	8	210
12	Will Ospreay	1	4	182
13	Kid Lykos	1	3	154
14	Eddie Dennis	1	2	126
15	Rampage Brown	1	2	119
16	Chris Ridgeway	1	1	69
17	Jonathan Gresham	1	0	56
18	Mark Haskins	1	1	35
18	Pastor William Eaver	1	1	35
20	Malakai Black	1	0	21
21	Big Damo	1	2	15
22	Mark Andrews	1	0	<1
