= Spike Trivet =

British professional wrestler

Personal information
- Born: September 7 Cambridge, England

Professional wrestling career
- Ring name(s): Lord Spike Trivet; Spike Trivet
- Trained by: Darrell Allen; Eddie Dennis; Mike Bird
- Debut: 2016

Simon Every, better known by his ring name Spike Trivet, is an English professional wrestler currently performing on the British independent scene. He is best known for his tenure with British promotion Progress Wrestling where he is a former PROGRESS World Champion.

== Early life ==
Prior to his professional wrestling career, Every pursued an acting career in London. He cited Shane McMahon as one of his biggest inspirations in wrestling.

== Professional wrestling career ==
=== Independent circuit (2016–present) ===
Every is known for competing in various promotions of the British independent scene as well as many other European promotions. At IPW Tuesday Night Graps: Forever, an event promoted by International Pro Wrestling: United Kingdom on April 16, 2019, he competed in a srcamble match won by Charli Evans and also involving Big T. Justice, Connor Mills, Fraser Thomas, Gene Munny, Man Like DeReiss, Ricky Knight Jr. and Sugar Dunkerton, TK Cooper. At wXw wXwNOW & Friends Showcase 2023, an event promoted by Westside Xtreme Wrestling on March 11, 2023, he successfully defended the PROGRESS World Championship against Danny Black.

=== Progress Wrestling (2016–present) ===
Every made his professional wrestling debut in Progress Wrestling at PTNTL:4, an event promoted on August 8, 2016, where he fell short to Chuck Mambo in singles competition.

During his time in the company, he competed in various o the promotion's signature events entitled as "chapters". At PROGRESS Chapter 76: Hello Wembley! on September 30, 2018, he took part in a battle royal won by Chuck Mambo and also involving Chris Ridgeway, Drew Parker, Danny Duggan, Rickey Shane Page and others. At PROGRESS Chapter 82 on December 30, 2018, he competed in a six-way match won by Chris Ridgeway and also involving Jody Fleisch, Mark Haskins, Shigehiro Irie and Travis Banks. Every has been part of the "Do Not Resuscitate" stable. At PROGRESS Chapter 85: Progro.Naut on March 9, 2019, he teamed up with stablemates Chuck Mambo and William Eaver to defeat Eddie Dennis, Jimmy Havoc and Mark Haskins in a six-man tag team match. At Chapter 95: Still Chasing from September 15, 2019, he competed in a 30-person royal rumble match for the inaugural Progress Proteus Championship won by Paul Robinson and also involving many other notable opponents, both male and female such as Dan Moloney, Eddie Kingston, Ilja Dragunov, Jonathan Gresham, Session Moth Martina, Mike Bailey and Millie McKenzie. Every chased for the PROGRESS Tag Team Championship as he teamed up with Chuck Mambo at PROGRESS Chapter 94 on August 25, 2019, and unsuccessfully challenged Aussie Open (Kyle Fletcher and Mark Davis) in a number one contendership match for the titles. He shared a feud with Cara Noir which concluded at PROGRESS Chapter 135 on June 4, 2022, in an I Quit match after which the loser was forced to leave Progress. Every won the match as he sent Noir off the promotion. Every moved to the world title scene beginning with PROGRESS Chapter 136 from July 24, 2022, where he won an eight-way contendership match also involving Axel Tischer, Dan Moloney, Danny Black, Gene Munny, Kid Lykos II, Man Like DeReiss and Robbie X. At PROGRESS Chapter 139 Warriors Come Out To Play on August 28, 2022, Every successfully cashed in his opportunity on Big Damo who previously defended the world title against Dan Moloney the same night and became champion. Every would eventually lose the PROGRESS World Championship to Kid Lykos in a steel cage match at Chapter 163: Twisted Metal on February 25, 2024.

== Championships and accomplishments ==
- Apex Pro Wrestling
  - Apex Heavyweight Championship (1 time)
- Anarchy Pro Wrestling
  - APW Championship (1 time)
- Tidal Championship Wrestling
  - TIDAL Championship (1 time, current)
- NORTH Wrestling
  - NORTH Championship (1 time)
- Riot Cabaret Pro Wrestling
  - Riot Cabaret World Championship (1 time)
- Pro Wrestling Illustrated
  - Ranked No. 161 of the top 500 singles wrestlers in the PWI 500 in 2023
- Progress Wrestling
  - PROGRESS World Championship (1 time)
- Riptide Wrestling
  - Riptide Brighton Championship (1 time, final)
- Wrestling Resurgence
  - Resurgence Championship (1 time)

== Luchas de Apuestas record ==
| Winner (wager) | Loser (wager) | Location | Event | Date | Notes |
|---|---|---|---|---|---|
| Spike Trivet (title) | Kid Lykos (mask) | London, England | PROGRESS Chapter 160: VENDETTA | 26 November 2023 | |
